= 2024–25 Thai League 3 National Championship =

Thai League 3 National Championship
- Season: 2024–25
- Dates: 19 April 2025 – 22 June 2025

The 2024–25 Thai League 3 National Championship is the concluding phase of the 2024–25 Thai League 3. It determines the national champion of Thailand's third-tier professional football league and the three clubs that will earn promotion to Thai League 2 for the 2025–26 season. This stage features 12 clubs, consisting of the champions and runners-up from the six regional groups. These clubs compete in a two-phase format: a group stage followed by a knockout stage. The competition begins on 19 April 2025 and concludes with the final's second leg on 22 June 2025.

== Format ==
The 12 best clubs from the Regional Stage are divided into three groups. Each group plays in a round-robin, home-and-away format. The top club from each group advances to the semi-finals, along with the best second-placed club from all groups.

The knockout stage, held over two legs, uses aggregate scoring, with the away goals rule applied in case of a tie. If still level, extra time and penalties will decide the winner. Semifinal winners reach the final and secure promotion to Thai League 2, while the semifinal losers compete for promotion play-off, with the winner finish as third places and also earning promotion. This format ensures strong competition and offers promotion opportunities to the top clubs.

== Teams ==
Locations of the 2024–25 Thai League 3 National Championship Teams
Group A
Group B
Group C

The following 12 clubs qualified for the 2024–25 Thai League 3 National Championship by securing either first or second place in their respective regional groups during the Regional Stage:

Team	Qualifying method
Maejo United	Northern region champions
Khelang United	Northern region runners-up
Lopburi City	Central region champions
North Bangkok University	Central region runners-up
Rasisalai United	Northeastern region champions
Khon Kaen	Northeastern region runners-up
Navy	Eastern region champions
Fleet	Eastern region runners-up
Samut Sakhon City	Western region champions
Thonburi United	Western region runners-up
Songkhla	Southern region champions
Pattani	Southern region runners-up

=== Stadiums and locations ===
Team	Location	Stadium	Coordinates
Fleet	Chonburi (Sattahip)	Battleship Stadium	12°39′38″N 100°55′25″E
Khelang United	Lampang (Mueang)	Stadium of Lampang Rajabhat University	18°14′07″N 99°29′22″E
Khon Kaen	Khon Kaen (Mueang)	Khon Kaen PAO. Stadium	16°24′46″N 102°49′40″E
Lopburi City	Lopburi (Mueang)	Phra Ramesuan Stadium	14°48′04″N 100°38′52″E
Maejo United	Chiang Mai (Doi Saket)	Stadium of Rajamangala University of Technology Lanna, Doi Saket Campus	18°51′28″N 99°10′39″E
Navy	Chonburi (Sattahip)	Sattahip Navy Stadium	12°39′49″N 100°56′09″E
North Bangkok University	Pathum Thani (Thanyaburi)	Stadium of North Bangkok University	14°00′22″N 100°40′24″E
Pattani	Pattani (Mueang)	Pattani PAO. Stadium	6°53′20″N 101°14′41″E
Rasisalai United	Sisaket (Mueang)	Sisaket Provincial Stadium	15°05′21″N 104°19′25″E
Samut Sakhon City	Samut Sakhon (Mueang)	Stadium of Thailand National Sports University, Samut Sakhon Campus	13°32′30″N 100°16′52″E
Songkhla	Songkhla (Mueang)	Tinsulanon Stadium	7°12′26″N 100°35′55″E
Thonburi United	Bangkok (Nong Khaem)	Thonburi Stadium	13°43′28″N 100°20′43″E

== Group stage ==
Each group competes in a round-robin format, with home-and-away matches determining the final standings. The top club from each group and the best second-placed club across all groups qualify for the knockout stage.

=== Group A ===
Pos	Team	Pld	W	D	L	GF	GA	GD	Pts	Qualification	NBU	LBC	MJU	KLU
1	North Bangkok University (Q)	6	3	3	0	10	4	+6	12	Advance to knockout stage	—	3–1	0–0	1–1
2	Lopburi City	6	2	1	3	9	12	−3	7 (Note: Lopburi City ahead on head-to-head points record; Lopburi City 4 pts, Maejo United 1 pt.)		0–3	—	3–3	1–2
3	Maejo United	6	1	4	1	8	9	−1	7		1–1	0–2	—	2–2
4	Khelang United	6	1	2	3	8	10	−2	5		1–2	1–2	1–2	—

Source: Thai League
Rules for classification: 1) Points; 2) Head-to-head points; 3) Head-to-head goal difference; 4) Head-to-head goal scored; 5) Overall goal difference; 6) Overall goal scored; 7) Fair play points; 8) Play-off without extra time).
(Q) Qualified for the phase indicated
Notes:
20 April 2025
16:00 UTC+7
Matchday 1

North Bangkok University	3–1	Lopburi City
Elias Emanuel de Magalhães Souza 14', 45', 81'	Report	Kitti Kinnonkok 6'

Stadium of North Bangkok University,
Thanyaburi, Pathum Thani
Attendance: 180
Referee: Wichai Pannil (Thailand)
21 April 2025
18:00 UTC+7
Matchday 1

Khelang United	1–2	Maejo United
Thanachok Chitrak 3'	Report	Douglas Mineiro 11' (pen.); Seo Min-guk 64'

Lampang Provincial Stadium,
Mueang, Lampang
Attendance: 420
Referee: Nararit Srivorakul (Thailand)

26 April 2025
18:00 UTC+7
Matchday 2

Lopburi City	1–2	Khelang United
Kitti Kinnonkok 11'	Report; Highlight	Nattakan Katrugsa 4'; Boonkerd Chaiyasin 34'

Phra Ramesuan Stadium,
Mueang, Lopburi
Attendance: 215
Referee: U-sen Yala (Thailand)
27 April 2025
17:00 UTC+7
Matchday 2

Maejo United	1–1	North Bangkok University
Seo Min-guk 90'	Report; Highlight	Veeraphong Aon-pean 88'

Stadium of Rajamangala University of Technology Lanna, Doi Saket Campus,
Doi Saket, Chiang Mai
Attendance: 205
Referee: Wicharn Klinthaworn (Thailand)

3 May 2025
16:00 UTC+7
Matchday 3

North Bangkok University	1–1	Khelang United
Noppavit Tomyim 33'	Report; Highlight	Mathas Kajaree 81' (pen.)

Stadium of North Bangkok University,
Thanyaburi, Pathum Thani
Attendance: 220
Referee: Kriangkrai Thiphanunjarukorn (Thailand)
4 May 2025
16:00 UTC+7
Matchday 3

Lopburi City	3–3	Maejo United
Kitti Kinnonkok 38', 67', 76'	Report	Seo Min-guk 28', 56', 62'

Phra Ramesuan Stadium,
Mueang, Lopburi
Attendance: 210
Referee: Wathanyu Morin (Thailand)

10 May 2025
18:00 UTC+7
Matchday 4

Khelang United	1–2	Lopburi City
Thanachok Chitrak 25'	Report	Kitti Kinnonkok 44', 63'

Lampang Provincial Stadium,
Mueang, Lampang
Attendance: 426
Referee: Seksan Phansri (Thailand)
11 May 2025
16:00 UTC+7
Matchday 4

North Bangkok University	0–0	Maejo United
	Report

Stadium of North Bangkok University,
Thanyaburi, Pathum Thani
Attendance: 150
Referee: Kriangkrai Thiphanunjarukorn (Thailand)

17 May 2025
18:00 UTC+7
Matchday 5

Khelang United	1–2	North Bangkok University
Taku Hishida 17'	Report	Elias Emanuel de Magalhães Souza 34', 52'

Lampang Provincial Stadium,
Mueang, Lampang
Attendance: 320
Referee: Niwat Insa-ard (Thailand)
18 May 2025
17:00 UTC+7
Matchday 5

Maejo United	0–2	Lopburi City
	Report; Highlight	Atthaphon Pannakhen 66'; Arnont Pumsiri 69'

Stadium of Rajamangala University of Technology Lanna, Doi Saket Campus,
Doi Saket, Chiang Mai
Attendance: 180
Referee: Veeraporn Maophaeo (Thailand)

24 May 2025
17:00 UTC+7
Matchday 6

Maejo United	2–2	Khelang United
Douglas Mineiro 22', 90+6'	Report; Highlight	Taku Hishida 26'; Suksan Kaewpanya 51'

Stadium of Rajamangala University of Technology Lanna, Doi Saket Campus,
Doi Saket, Chiang Mai
Attendance: 111
Referee: Satchukorn Saenchu (Thailand)
24 May 2025
17:00 UTC+7
Matchday 6

Lopburi City	0–3	North Bangkok University
	Report; Highlight	Veeraphong Aon-pean 15', 24'; Watthanachai Nantavichianrit 90+5'

Phra Ramesuan Stadium,
Mueang, Lopburi
Attendance: 411
Referee: Woottipong Ketkam (Thailand)

=== Group B ===
Pos	Team	Pld	W	D	L	GF	GA	GD	Pts	Qualification	RSL	FLT	NVY	KKN
1	Rasisalai United (Q)	6	3	3	0	9	6	+3	12	Advance to knockout stage	—	2–1	1–0	2–2
2	Fleet	6	2	2	2	8	7	+1	8		1–1	—	1–1	2–0
3	Navy	6	1	4	1	8	7	+1	7		1–1	3–1	—	2–2
4	Khon Kaen	6	0	3	3	6	11	−5	3		1–2	0–2	1–1	—

Source: Thai League
Rules for classification: 1) Points; 2) Head-to-head points; 3) Head-to-head goal difference; 4) Head-to-head goal scored; 5) Overall goal difference; 6) Overall goal scored; 7) Fair play points; 8) Play-off without extra time).
(Q) Qualified for the phase indicated
19 April 2025
16:00 UTC+7
Matchday 1

Fleet	1–1	Navy
Jakkapong Polmart 45+3'	Report; Highlight	Gustavo Alexandre Barbosa do Nascimento 60' (pen.)

Battleship Stadium,
Sattahip, Chonburi
Attendance: 315
Referee: Kittichai Huthip (Thailand)
20 April 2025
18:00 UTC+7
Matchday 1

Khon Kaen	1–2	Rasisalai United
Kittichai Yomkhot 50'	Report	Alberto Moreira Gouvea 33'; Supab Muengchan 83'

Khon Kaen PAO. Stadium,
Mueang, Khon Kaen
Attendance: 1,563
Referee: Pichit Thongjanmoon (Thailand)

26 April 2025
18:00 UTC+7
Matchday 2

Navy	2–2	Khon Kaen
Panigazzi Matías Ignacio 6', 31'	Report	Charin Boodhad 83'; João Guimarães 90+6'

Sattahip Navy Stadium,
Sattahip, Chonburi
Attendance: 300
Referee: Chaikrit Inboonsong (Thailand)
27 April 2025
17:00 UTC+7
Matchday 2

Rasisalai United	2–1	Fleet
Gilberto Macena 43', 64'	Report; Highlight	Pedro Manzi 80'

Sisaket Provincial Stadium,
Mueang, Sisaket
Attendance: 759
Referee: Alongkorn Khonwai (Thailand)

3 May 2025
16:00 UTC+7
Matchday 3

Fleet	2–0	Khon Kaen
Vorakan Kavila 21'; Andayut Nimnuch 24'	Report; Highlight

Battleship Stadium,
Sattahip, Chonburi
Attendance: 205
Referee: Chaireag Ngam-som (Thailand)
4 May 2025
18:00 UTC+7
Matchday 3

Navy	1–1	Rasisalai United
Panigazzi Matías Ignacio 90+1'	Report	Gilberto Macena 32' (pen.)

Sattahip Navy Stadium,
Sattahip, Chonburi
Attendance: 650
Referee: Veeraporn Maophaeo (Thailand)

10 May 2025
18:00 UTC+7
Matchday 4

Khon Kaen	1–1	Navy
João Guimarães 62'	Report	Pongpan Parapan 42'

Khon Kaen PAO. Stadium,
Mueang, Khon Kaen
Attendance: 1,167
Referee: Satchukorn Saenchu (Thailand)
11 May 2025
16:00 UTC+7
Matchday 4

Fleet	1–1	Rasisalai United
Jakrayut Vivatvanit 61'	Report; Highlight	Nattapon Yongsakul 4'

Battleship Stadium,
Sattahip, Chonburi
Attendance: 425
Referee: Somkhid Sarapim (Thailand)

18 May 2025
17:00 UTC+7
Matchday 5

Rasisalai United	1–0	Navy
Nattapon Yongsakul 2'	Report

Sisaket Provincial Stadium,
Mueang, Sisaket
Attendance: 979
Referee: Kriangkrai Thiphanunjarukorn (Thailand)
18 May 2025
18:00 UTC+7
Matchday 5

Khon Kaen	0–2	Fleet
	Report; Highlight	Jakrayut Vivatvanit 62'; Pedro Manzi 73'

Khon Kaen PAO. Stadium,
Mueang, Khon Kaen
Attendance: 1,124
Referee: Anusorn Nookaew (Thailand)

24 May 2025
17:00 UTC+7
Matchday 6

Rasisalai United	2–2	Khon Kaen
Supab Muengchan 62'; Gilberto Macena 69'	Report	Thanaphat Phutnok 28'; Ratthaphon Phoopharot 82'

Sisaket Provincial Stadium,
Mueang, Sisaket
Attendance: 429
Referee: Putthipong Issising (Thailand)
24 May 2025
17:00 UTC+7
Matchday 6

Navy	3–1	Fleet
Thatchapol Chai-yan 48'; Panigazzi Matías Ignacio 70'; Nattapoom Maya 89'	Report	Saranphat Srirat 80'

Sattahip Navy Stadium,
Sattahip, Chonburi
Attendance: 350
Referee: Noppadet Mangngam (Thailand)

=== Group C ===
Pos	Team	Pld	W	D	L	GF	GA	GD	Pts	Qualification	SKA	PTN	SKN	TBU
1	Songkhla (Q)	6	4	1	1	9	8	+1	13	Advance to knockout stage	—	0–4	2–0	1–0
2	Pattani (Q)	6	3	1	2	13	6	+7	10	Advance to knockout stage	1–1	—	1–0	4–0
3	Samut Sakhon City	6	2	0	4	6	9	−3	6 (Note: The head-to-head record is tied; Samut Sakhon City 3 pts (GD 0, GF 2), Thonburi United 3 pts (GD 0, GF 2). Samut Sakhon City is ahead in the overall goals difference.)		1–2	3–2	—	1–2
4	Thonburi United	6	2	0	4	6	11	−5	6		2–3	2–1	0–1	—

Source: Thai League
Rules for classification: 1) Points; 2) Head-to-head points; 3) Head-to-head goal difference; 4) Head-to-head goal scored; 5) Overall goal difference; 6) Overall goal scored; 7) Fair play points; 8) Play-off without extra time).
(Q) Qualified for the phase indicated
Notes:
19 April 2025
17:00 UTC+7
Matchday 1

Samut Sakhon City	3–2	Pattani
Nasree Dueloh 44' (o.g.); Atthawit Sukchuai 61' (pen.); Warayut Klomnak 76'	Report; Highlight	Adithep Chaisrianan 9'; Imron Hayiyusoh 88'

Stadium of Thailand National Sports University, Samut Sakhon Campus,
Mueang, Samut Sakhon
Attendance: 650
Referee: Kittiwat Kittpaksakun (Thailand)

26 April 2025
16:00 UTC+7
Matchday 2

Thonburi United	0–1	Samut Sakhon City
	Report; Highlight	Ratchapol Nawanno 45+2'

Thonburi Stadium,
Nong Khaem, Bangkok
Attendance: 780
Referee: Kristin Saisombat (Thailand)
27 April 2025
17:45 UTC+7
Matchday 2

Pattani	1–1	Songkhla
Felipe Nunes 67'	Report; Highlight	Sukree Etae 90'

Pattani PAO. Stadium,
Mueang, Pattani
Attendance: 3,523
Referee: Woottipong Ketkam (Thailand)

3 May 2025
16:00 UTC+7
Matchday 3

Thonburi United	2–1	Pattani
Suradech Klankham 62'; Kittipong Seanphong 68'	Report	Imron Hayiyusoh 4'

Thonburi Stadium,
Nong Khaem, Bangkok
Attendance: 1,180
Referee: Seksan Phansri (Thailand)
3 May 2025
17:00 UTC+7
Matchday 3

Samut Sakhon City	1–2	Songkhla
Burnel Okana-Stazi 35'	Report	Nobparut Raksachum 40'; Amnuai Nueaoon 69'

Stadium of Thailand National Sports University, Samut Sakhon Campus,
Mueang, Samut Sakhon
Attendance: 735
Referee: Pawara Seejen (Thailand)

7 May 2025
19:00 UTC+7
Matchday 1 (rescheduled)

Songkhla	1–0	Thonburi United
Jhonatan Bernardo 15'	Report

Tinsulanon Stadium,
Mueang, Songkhla
Attendance: 1,121
Referee: Thapakorn Thongkon (Thailand)

10 May 2025
17:45 UTC+7
Matchday 4

Pattani	1–0	Samut Sakhon City
Kim Jin-hyeong 61'	Report

Pattani PAO. Stadium,
Mueang, Pattani
Attendance: 2,489
Referee: Winat Phophat (Thailand)
11 May 2025
16:00 UTC+7
Matchday 4

Thonburi United	2–3	Songkhla
Surat Suriyachai 49', 64'	Report; Highlight	Anwa A-leemama 35'; Sanan Samala 39'; Chanchon Jomkao 75'

Thonburi Stadium,
Nong Khaem, Bangkok
Attendance: 1,170
Referee: Panumas Phansamo (Thailand)

17 May 2025
17:45 UTC+7
Matchday 5

Pattani	4–0	Thonburi United
Phuket Fueangkhon 40'; Marlon Henrique Brandão da Silva 58', 90+6'; Adithep Chaisrianan 82'	Report; Highlight

Pattani PAO. Stadium,
Mueang, Pattani
Attendance: 2,244
Referee: Woottipong Ketkam (Thailand)
18 May 2025
19:00 UTC+7
Matchday 5

Songkhla	2–0	Samut Sakhon City
Anwa A-leemama 26'; Ramiro Lizaso 90+5'	Report

Tinsulanon Stadium,
Mueang, Songkhla
Attendance: 1,400
Referee: Somkhid Sarapim (Thailand)

24 May 2025
17:00 UTC+7
Matchday 6

Songkhla	0–4	Pattani
	Report	Felipe Nunes 20', 39'; Safwan Awae 63', 87'

Tinsulanon Stadium,
Mueang, Songkhla
Attendance: 1,258
Referee: Pawara Seejen (Thailand)
24 May 2025
17:00 UTC+7
Matchday 6

Samut Sakhon City	1–2	Thonburi United
Burnel Okana-Stazi 47'	Report; Highlight	Narathip Kruearanya 32'; Surat Suriyachai 78'

Stadium of Thailand National Sports University, Samut Sakhon Campus,
Mueang, Samut Sakhon
Attendance: 480
Referee: Niwat Insa-ard (Thailand)

=== Ranking of second-placed clubs ===
Pos	Grp	Team	Pld	W	D	L	GF	GA	GD	Pts	Qualification
1	C	Pattani	6	3	1	2	13	6	+7	10	Advance to knockout stage
2	B	Fleet	6	2	2	2	8	7	+1	8	
3	A	Lopburi City	6	2	1	3	9	12	−3	7	

Source: Thai League
Rules for classification: 1) Points; 2) Goal difference; 3) Goals scored; 4) Away goals scored; 5) Wins; 6) Away wins.

== Knockout stage ==
The four advancing clubs enter the knockout rounds, which consist of the semi-finals, a third-place play-off, and the final. All matches are played over two legs, with aggregate scoring determining the winners. If the aggregate score is tied after both legs, extra time will be played, followed by a penalty shoot-out if necessary.

Semi-finals
Rasisalai United	5	0	5
Pattani	3	1	4
Songkhla	3	0	3
North Bangkok University	0	2	2

Finals
Rasisalai United	1	4	5
Songkhla	0	1	1
Third place play-offs
North Bangkok University	0	1	1
Pattani	0	2	2

=== Semi-finals ===
==== Summary ====
Team 1	Agg.	Team 2	1st leg	2nd leg
Rasisalai United	5–4	Pattani	5–3	0–1
Songkhla	3–2	North Bangkok University	3–0	0–2

==== Matches ====
1 June 2025
17:00 UTC+7
Semi-finals 1st leg

Rasisalai United	5–3	Pattani
Natchanon Yongsakool 37', 72'; Supab Muengchan 44'; Alberto Moreira Gouvea 61' (pen.), 82'	Report	Safwan Awae 63'; Marlon Henrique Brandão da Silva 68' (pen.), 77'

Sisaket Provincial Stadium,
Mueang, Sisaket
Attendance: 3,195
Referee: Krisda Luangyos (Thailand)
7 June 2025
16:30 UTC+7
Semi-finals 2nd leg

Pattani	1–0	Rasisalai United
Safwan Awae 75'	Report; Highlight

Pattani PAO. Stadium,
Mueang, Pattani
Attendance: 12,000
Referee: Woottipong Ketkam (Thailand)

Rasisalai United won 5–4 on aggregate.

1 June 2025
19:00 UTC+7
Semi-finals 1st leg

Songkhla	3–0	North Bangkok University
Ramiro Lizaso 10'; Sanan Samala 16'; Chanchon Jomkao 49'	Report

Tinsulanon Stadium,
Mueang, Songkhla
Attendance: 2,400
Referee: Noppadet Mangngam (Thailand)
8 June 2025
15:30 UTC+7
Semi-finals 2nd leg

North Bangkok University	2–0	Songkhla
Tanapat Phimol 21'; Veeraphong Aon-pean 45'	Report; Highlight

Stadium of North Bangkok University,
Thanyaburi, Pathum Thani
Attendance: 1,000
Referee: Pawara Seejen (Thailand)

Songkhla won 3–2 on aggregate.

=== Third place play-offs ===
==== Summary ====
Team 1	Agg.	Team 2	1st leg	2nd leg
North Bangkok University	1–2	Pattani	0–0	1–2

==== Matches ====
14 June 2025
16:00 UTC+7
Third place play-offs 1st leg

North Bangkok University	0–0	Pattani
	Report

Stadium of North Bangkok University,
Thanyaburi, Pathum Thani
Attendance: 650
Referee: Satchukorn Saenchu (Thailand)
21 June 2025
16:30 UTC+7
Third place play-offs 2nd leg

Pattani	2–1	North Bangkok University
Marlon Henrique Brandão da Silva 45', 80' (pen.)	Report	Marlon Henrique Brandão da Silva 48' (o.g.)

Pattani PAO. Stadium,
Mueang, Pattani
Attendance: 11,000
Referee: Pawara Seejen (Thailand)

Pattani won 2–1 on aggregate.

=== Finals ===
==== Summary ====
Team 1	Agg.	Team 2	1st leg	2nd leg
Rasisalai United	5–1	Songkhla	1–0	4–1

==== Matches ====
===== 1st leg =====
15 June 2025
17:00 UTC+7
Finals 1st leg

Rasisalai United	1–0	Songkhla
Gilberto Macena 45+2'	Report

Sisaket Provincial Stadium,
Mueang, Sisaket
Attendance: 3,789
Referee: Kotchapoom Meesridaecha (Thailand)

Rasisalai United	Songkhla

Lineups:
GK	99	(Thailand) Sakkongpop Sukprasert
RB	23	(Thailand) Jirawat Chingchaiyaphum
CB	30	(Thailand) Thitiphong Photumtha
CB	5	(Brazil) Ramon Mesquita
LB	19	(Thailand) Aphisit Nusonsala
DM	32	(Thailand) Somyot Pongsuwan (c)		(yellow card) 69'
CM	8	(Thailand) Natchanon Yongsakul		(yellow card) 57'
CM	7	(Thailand) Nattapon Yongsakul			(substituted off) 75'
RF	37	(Brazil) Alberto Moreira Gouvea
CF	10	(Brazil) Gilberto Macena	45+2'
LF	27	(Thailand) Supab Muengchan		(yellow card) 90'	(substituted off) 90+3'
Substitutes:
GK	35	(Thailand) Sarawut Konglarp
GK	42	(Thailand) Pongsakorn Buatab
DF	2	(Thailand) Apidech Chansitha
DF	4	(Thailand) Apirak Thongjan
DF	6	(Thailand) Nattakrit Thongnoppakun			(substituted on) 90+3'
DF	29	(Thailand) Jaruphong Wongphithak
DF	76	(Thailand) Phitakpong Chaiyapho
DF	98	(Thailand) Noppadol Rojchanakongyoo
MF	28	(Thailand) Thanongsak Khrutthasarn
MF	47	(Thailand) Tayawat Nomrawee
FW	11	(Thailand) Noppawit Petch-om		(yellow card) 90'	(substituted on) 75'
FW	21	(Thailand) Winai Aimoat
Head Coach:
(Thailand) Arnon Bandasak

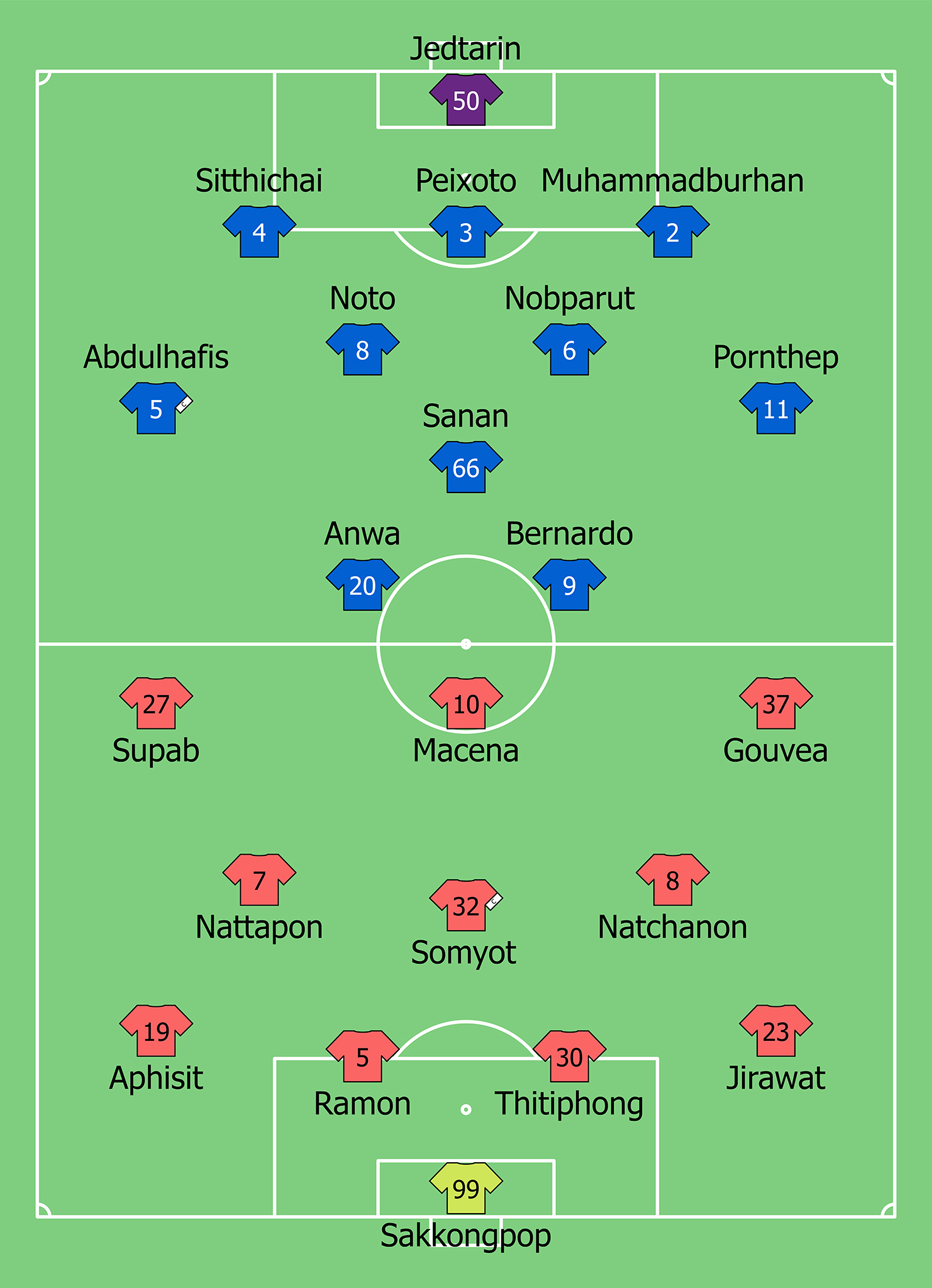

Lineups:
GK	50	(Thailand) Jedtarin Bunchod
CB	4	(Thailand) Sitthichai Chimrueang
CB	3	(Brazil) Emerson Felipe Alves Peixoto de Almeida
CB	2	(Thailand) Muhammadburhan Awae
RM	5	(Thailand) Abdulhafis Nibu (c)
DM	8	(Thailand) Noto Boontawan		(substituted off) 58'
DM	6	(Thailand) Nobparut Raksachum
LM	11	(Thailand) Pornthep Heemla		(substituted off) 46'
AM	66	(Thailand) Sanan Samala		(substituted off) 90+4'
CF	20	(Thailand) Anwa A-leemama		(substituted off) 79'
CF	9	(Brazil) Jhonatan Bernardo	(yellow card) 21'
Substitutes:
GK	25	(Thailand) Nathaphat Wannamat
DF	36	(Thailand) Chanchon Jomkao		(substituted on) 90+4'
DF	42	(Thailand) Phanitan Peuangkeaw
DF	96	(Thailand) Chanatip Krainara
MF	28	(Thailand) Amnuai Nueaoon		(substituted on) 58'
MF	38	(Thailand) Ridwan Ruangchuai
FW	7	(Thailand) Suttipong Yaifai			(substituted on) 90+4'
FW	10	(Argentina) Ramiro Lizaso		(substituted on) 46'
FW	13	(Thailand) Sukree Etae		(substituted on) 79'	(substituted off) 90+4'
FW	14	(Thailand) Rungrod Mudlah
Head Coach:
(Japan) Daiki Higuchi

===== 2nd leg =====
22 June 2025
19:00 UTC+7
Finals 2nd leg

Songkhla	1–4	Rasisalai United
Jhonatan Bernardo 49'	Report	Gilberto Macena 34', 53', 90+1' (pen.); Alberto Moreira Gouvea 43'

Tinsulanon Stadium,
Mueang, Songkhla
Attendance: 3,490
Referee: Veeraporn Maophaeo (Thailand)

Songkhla	Rasisalai United

Lineups:
GK	46	(Thailand) Sorawat Phosaman
RB	36	(Thailand) Chanchon Jomkao		(yellow card) 45+3'	(substituted off) 46'
CB	5	(Thailand) Abdulhafis Nibu (c)
CB	4	(Thailand) Sitthichai Chimrueang
LB	2	(Thailand) Muhammadburhan Awae		(yellow card) 35' (yellow-red card) 83'
CM	28	(Thailand) Amnuai Nueaoon			(substituted off) 81'
CM	10	(Argentina) Ramiro Lizaso
AM	6	(Thailand) Nobparut Raksachum		(yellow card) 7'	(substituted off) 46'
RF	66	(Thailand) Sanan Samala			(substituted off) 88'
CF	20	(Thailand) Anwa A-leemama			(substituted off) 85'
LF	9	(Brazil) Jhonatan Bernardo	49'
Substitutes:
GK	50	(Thailand) Jedtarin Bunchod
DF	3	(Brazil) Emerson Felipe Alves Peixoto de Almeida			(substituted on) 46'
DF	31	(Thailand) Supakon Phetrat
DF	42	(Thailand) Phanitan Peuangkeaw
DF	96	(Thailand) Chanatip Krainara
MF	8	(Thailand) Noto Boontawan		(yellow card) 89'	(substituted on) 81'
MF	23	(Thailand) Natdanai Makkarat
MF	38	(Thailand) Ridwan Ruangchuai
FW	7	(Thailand) Suttipong Yaifai			(substituted on) 85'
FW	11	(Thailand) Pornthep Heemla			(substituted on) 46'
FW	14	(Thailand) Rungrod Mudlah			(substituted on) 88'
FW	91	(Thailand) Peerapat Kantha
Head Coach:
(Japan) Daiki Higuchi

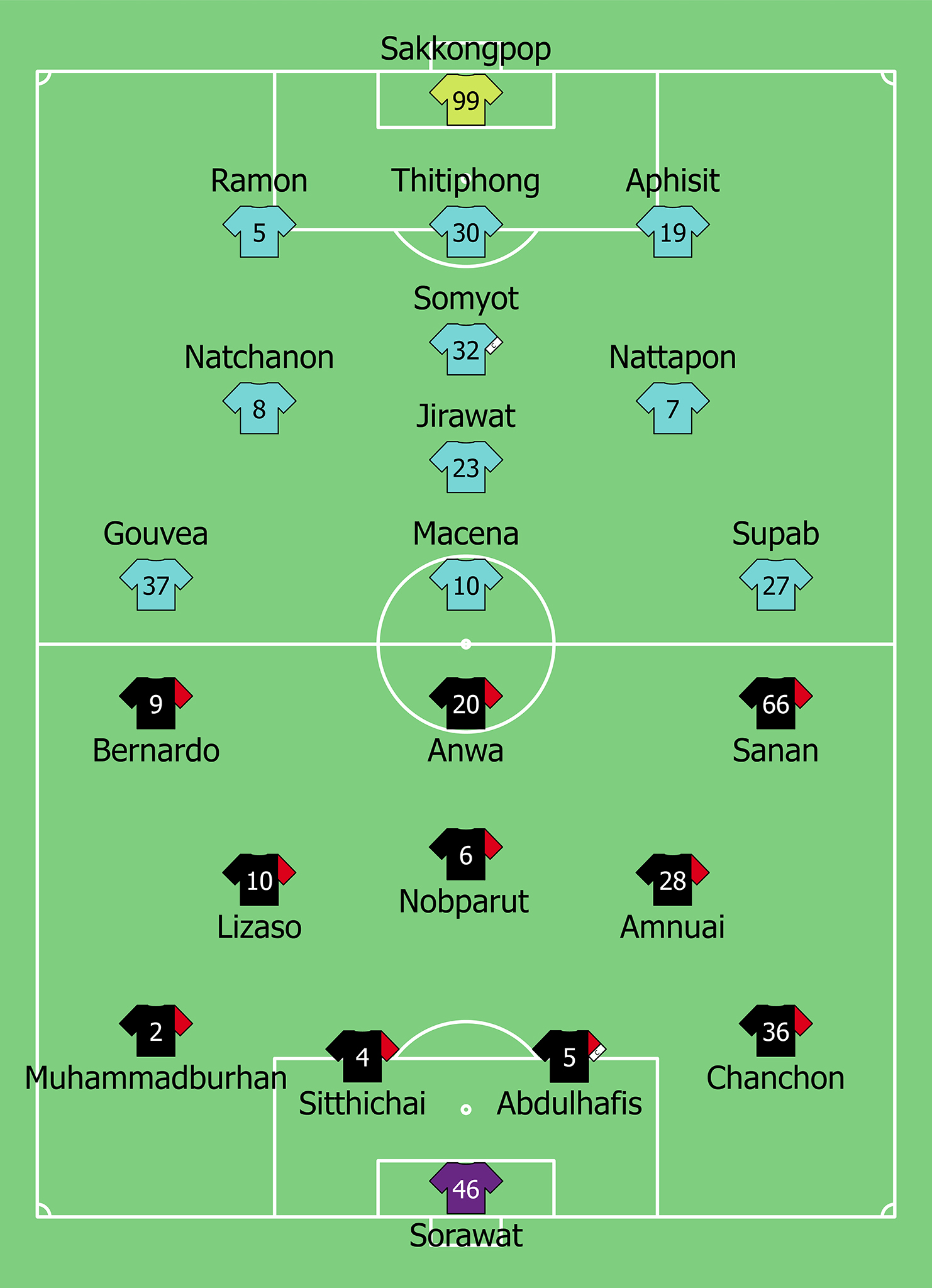

Lineups:
GK	99	(Thailand) Sakkongpop Sukprasert
CB	5	(Brazil) Ramon Mesquita
CB	30	(Thailand) Thitiphong Photumtha
CB	19	(Thailand) Aphisit Nusonsala			(substituted off) 90+2'
DM	32	(Thailand) Somyot Pongsuwan (c)		(yellow card) 77'
CM	8	(Thailand) Natchanon Yongsakul			(substituted off) 66'
CM	7	(Thailand) Nattapon Yongsakul			(substituted off) 90+2'
AM	23	(Thailand) Jirawat Chingchaiyaphum		(yellow card) 40'
RF	37	(Brazil) Alberto Moreira Gouvea	43'
CF	10	(Brazil) Gilberto Macena	34', 53', 90+1' (pen.)
LF	27	(Thailand) Supab Muengchan			(substituted off) 61'
Substitutes:
GK	35	(Thailand) Sarawut Konglarp
GK	42	(Thailand) Pongsakorn Buatab
DF	4	(Thailand) Apirak Thongjan
DF	6	(Thailand) Nattakrit Thongnoppakun			(substituted on) 61'
DF	29	(Thailand) Jaruphong Wongphithak
DF	76	(Thailand) Phitakpong Chaiyapho			(substituted on) 90+2'
DF	98	(Thailand) Noppadol Rojchanakongyoo
MF	28	(Thailand) Thanongsak Khrutthasarn
MF	47	(Thailand) Tayawat Nomrawee			(substituted on) 90+2'
FW	9	(Thailand) Teerayut Ngamlamai
FW	21	(Thailand) Winai Aimoat			(substituted on) 66'
Head Coach:
(Thailand) Arnon Bandasak

Rasisalai United won 5–1 on aggregate.

== Statistics ==
=== Goalscorers ===
There were 123 goals scored in 44 matches, for an average of 2.8 goals per match.

8 goals

- (Brazil) Gilberto Macena (Rasisalai United)

7 goals

- (Thailand) Kitti Kinnonkok (Lopburi City)

6 goals

- (Brazil) Marlon Henrique Brandão da Silva (Pattani)

5 goals

- (South Korea) Seo Min-guk (Maejo United)
- (Brazil) Elias Emanuel de Magalhães Souza (North Bangkok University)

4 goals

- (Argentina) Panigazzi Matías Ignacio (Navy)
- (Thailand) Veeraphong Aon-pean (North Bangkok University)
- (Thailand) Safwan Awae (Pattani)
- (Brazil) Alberto Moreira Gouvea (Rasisalai United)

3 goals

- (Brazil) Douglas Mineiro (Maejo United)
- (Brazil) Felipe Nunes (Pattani)
- (Thailand) Supab Muengchan (Rasisalai United)
- (Thailand) Surat Suriyachai (Thonburi United)

2 goals

- (Thailand) Jakrayut Vivatvanit (Fleet)
- (Uruguay) Pedro Manzi (Fleet)
- (Japan) Taku Hishida (Khelang United)
- (Thailand) Thanachok Chitrak (Khelang United)
- (Brazil) João Guimarães (Khon Kaen)
- (Thailand) Adithep Chaisrianan (Pattani)
- (Thailand) Imron Hayiyusoh (Pattani)
- (Thailand) Natchanon Yongsakool (Rasisalai United)
- (Thailand) Nattapon Yongsakul (Rasisalai United)
- (Republic of the Congo) Burnel Okana-Stazi (Samut Sakhon City)
- (Thailand) Anwa A-leemama (Songkhla)
- (Thailand) Chanchon Jomkao (Songkhla)
- (Brazil) Jhonatan Bernardo (Songkhla)
- (Argentina) Ramiro Lizaso (Songkhla)
- (Thailand) Sanan Samala (Songkhla)

1 goal

- (Thailand) Andayut Nimnuch (Fleet)
- (Thailand) Jakkapong Polmart (Fleet)
- (Thailand) Saranphat Srirat (Fleet)
- (Thailand) Vorakan Kavila (Fleet)
- (Thailand) Boonkerd Chaiyasin (Khelang United)
- (Thailand) Mathas Kajaree (Khelang United)
- (Thailand) Nattakan Katrugsa (Khelang United)
- (Thailand) Suksan Kaewpanya (Khelang United)
- (Thailand) Charin Boodhad (Khon Kaen)
- (Thailand) Kittichai Yomkhot (Khon Kaen)
- (Thailand) Ratthaphon Phoopharot (Khon Kaen)
- (Thailand) Thanaphat Phutnok (Khon Kaen)
- (Thailand) Arnont Pumsiri (Lopburi City)
- (Thailand) Atthaphon Pannakhen (Lopburi City)
- (Brazil) Gustavo Alexandre Barbosa do Nascimento (Navy)
- (Thailand) Nattapoom Maya (Navy)
- (Thailand) Pongpan Parapan (Navy)
- (Thailand) Thatchapol Chai-yan (Navy)
- (Thailand) Noppavit Tomyim (North Bangkok University)
- (Thailand) Tanapat Phimol (North Bangkok University)
- (Thailand) Watthanachai Nantavichianrit (North Bangkok University)
- (South Korea) Kim Jin-hyeong (Pattani)
- (Thailand) Phuket Fueangkhon (Pattani)
- (Thailand) Atthawit Sukchuai (Samut Sakhon City)
- (Thailand) Ratchapol Nawanno (Samut Sakhon City)
- (Thailand) Warayut Klomnak (Samut Sakhon City)
- (Thailand) Amnuai Nueaoon (Songkhla)
- (Thailand) Nobparut Raksachum (Songkhla)
- (Thailand) Sukree Etae (Songkhla)
- (Thailand) Kittipong Seanphong (Thonburi United)
- (Thailand) Narathip Kruearanya (Thonburi United)
- (Thailand) Suradech Klankham (Thonburi United)

1 own goal

- (Brazil) Marlon Henrique Brandão da Silva (Pattani against North Bangkok University)
- (Thailand) Nasree Dueloh (Pattani against Samut Sakhon City)

Source: Thai League

== Promotion to 2025–26 Thai League 2 ==
Team	Region	Method of qualification	Date of qualification
Rasisalai United	Northeastern region	Winners	7 June 2025
Songkhla	Southern region	Runners Up	8 June 2025
Pattani	Southern region	Promotion play-off Winners	21 June 2025
