= 2024–25 Thai League 3 Northern Region =

Thai League 3 Northern Region
- Season: 2024–25
- Dates: 14 September 2024 – 30 March 2025
- Champions: Maejo United
- Relegated: Phitsanulok Unity
- T3 National Championship: Maejo United; Khelang United
- Matches: 110
- Goals: 283 (2.57 per match)
- Top goalscorer: (Thailand) Mathas Kajaree (15 goals; Khelang United)
- Best goalkeeper: (Thailand) Pathomtat Sudprasert (11 clean sheets; Maejo United)
- Biggest home win: 4 goals difference Chiangmai 5–1 TPF Uttaradit (22 February 2025); Khelang United 4–0 Northern Nakhon Mae Sot United (2 March 2025)
- Biggest away win: 4 goals difference TPF Uttaradit 0–4 Chiangmai (27 October 2024); Chattrakan City 0–4 Maejo United (2 February 2025)
- Highest scoring: 6 goals Phitsanulok Unity 2–4 Chiangrai City (13 October 2024); Chiangmai 4–2 Northern Nakhon Mae Sot United (10 November 2024); Khelang United 3–3 Chiangmai (18 January 2025); TPF Uttaradit 3–3 Nakhon Sawan See Khwae City (15 February 2025); Chiangmai 5–1 TPF Uttaradit (22 February 2025); Phitsanulok Unity 2–4 Khelang United (15 March 2025); Chiangmai 4–2 Phitsanulok Unity (30 March 2025)
- Longest winning run: 5 matches Phitsanulok; TPF Uttaradit
- Longest unbeaten run: 17 matches Maejo United
- Longest winless run: 8 matches Chiangrai City
- Longest losing run: 6 matches Kamphaengphet
- Highest attendance: 1,285; Phitsanulok 1–2 Chiangmai (6 October 2024)
- Lowest attendance: 0
- Total attendance: 31,833
- Average attendance: 306

The 2024–25 Thai League 3 Northern Region is part of the 2024–25 Thai League 3 Regional Stage, consisting of 11 clubs located across the northern region of Thailand, including some areas in the upper parts of the central and western regions. The season will commence on 14 September 2024, with clubs competing in a round-robin format featuring home-and-away matches. The Regional Stage will conclude on 30 March 2025, at which point the top two clubs will advance to the National Championship Stage, while the bottom-placed club will face relegation to the Thailand Semi-pro League for the following season. This stage showcases the spirit of football in Thailand's highlands, where clubs represent the cultural and historical richness of the northern provinces.

== Seasonal Changes ==
=== Relegation from Thai League 2 ===
Chiangmai was relegated to Thai League 3 due to failing to meet club licensing standards. The club will now compete in the Northern Region for the 2024–25 season, bringing higher-level competition.

=== Promotion from Thailand Semi-pro League ===
Chattrakan City earned promotion from the Thailand Semi-pro League and joined the Northern Region, adding fresh competition for this season.

=== Club licensing failures ===
Kongkrailas United and Rongseemaechaithanachotiwat Phayao, despite meeting competitive criteria, were relegated to the Thailand Semi-pro League after failing to comply with licensing requirements. This has allowed Nakhon Sawan See Khwae City, the last-place club in the 2023–24 season, to remain in Thai League 3.

=== Club name and logo changes ===
- Phitsanulok Unity revamped its identity, changing its logo from a field rat to a fighting cock, symbolizing King Naresuan the Great's legendary fighting cock.
- Uttaradit Saksiam rebranded as TPF Uttaradit, adopting a completely new logo while keeping the image of Phraya Phichai, a historical local hero.

== Teams ==
=== Number of teams by province ===
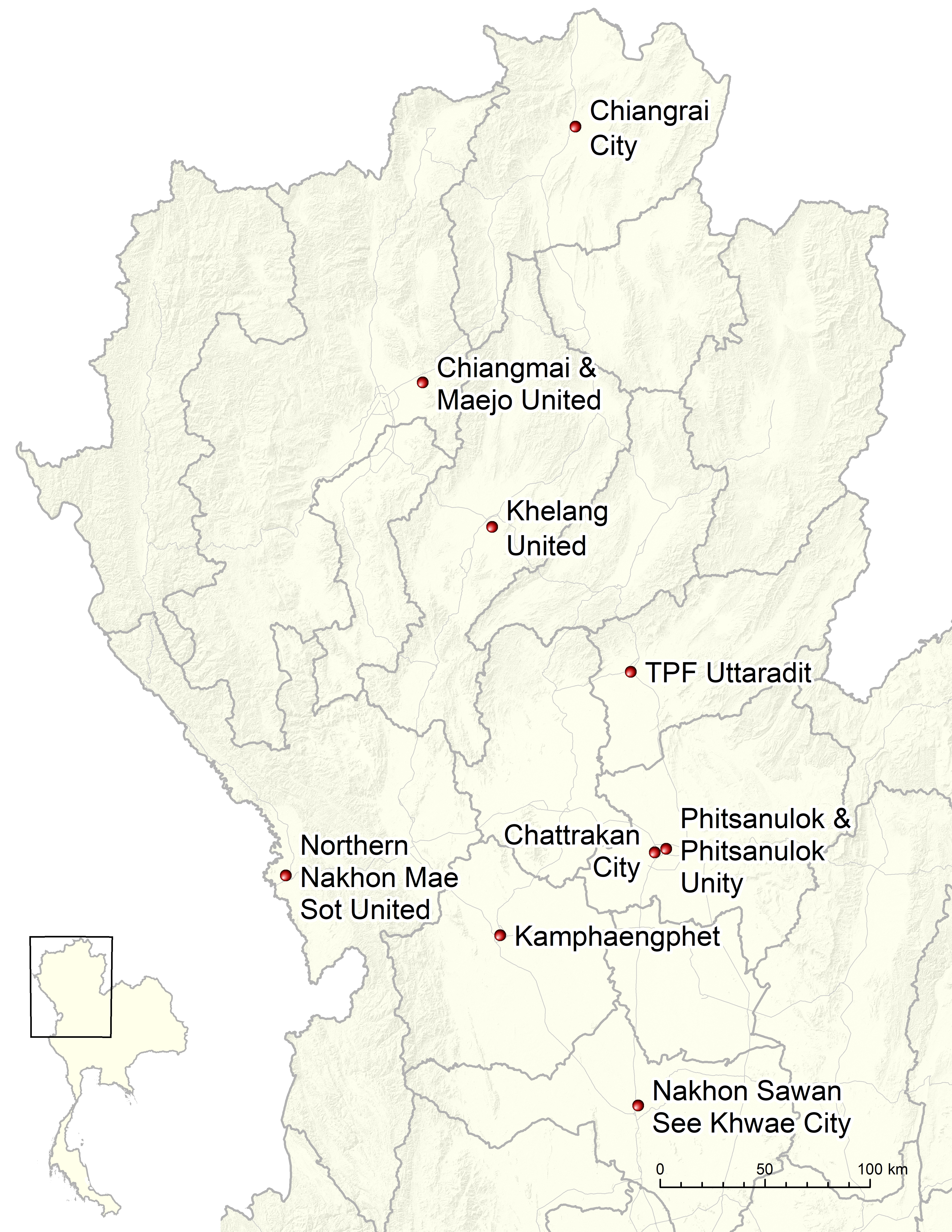
Locations of the 2024–25 Thai League 3 Northern Region clubs.

| Position | Province | Number | Teams |
|---|---|---|---|
| 1 | Phitsanulok | 3 | Chattrakan City, Phitsanulok, and Phitsanulok Unity |
| 2 | Chiang Mai | 2 | Chiangmai and Maejo United |
| 3 | Chiang Rai | 1 | Chiangrai City |
| 3 | Kamphaeng Phet | 1 | Kamphaengphet |
| 3 | Lampang | 1 | Khelang United |
| 3 | Nakhon Sawan | 1 | Nakhon Sawan See Khwae City |
| 3 | Tak | 1 | Northern Nakhon Mae Sot United |
| 3 | Uttaradit | 1 | TPF Uttaradit |

=== Stadiums and locations ===
| Team | Location | Stadium | Coordinates |
|---|---|---|---|
| Chattrakan City | Phitsanulok (Mueang) | Stadium of Pibulsongkram Rajabhat University | 16°49′55″N 100°12′47″E |
| Chiangmai | Chiang Mai (Doi Saket) | Stadium of Rajamangala University of Technology Lanna, Doi Saket Campus | 18°51′28″N 99°10′39″E |
| Chiangrai City | Chiangrai (Mueang) | Singha Chiangrai Stadium | 19°57′25″N 99°52′29″E |
| Kamphaengphet | Kamphaengphet (Mueang) | Cha Kung Rao Stadium | 16°28′40″N 99°31′17″E |
| Khelang United | Lampang (Mueang) | Stadium of Lampang Rajabhat University | 18°14′07″N 99°29′22″E |
| Maejo United | Chiang Mai (Doi Saket) | Stadium of Rajamangala University of Technology Lanna, Doi Saket Campus | 18°51′28″N 99°10′39″E |
| Nakhon Sawan See Khwae City | Nakhon Sawan (Mueang) | Stadium of Nakhon Sawan Sports School | 15°44′33″N 100°07′56″E |
| Northern Nakhon Mae Sot United | Tak (Mae Sot) | Five Border Districts Stadium | 16°44′07″N 98°33′52″E |
| Phitsanulok | Phitsanulok (Mueang) | Phitsanulok PAO. Stadium | 16°50′48″N 100°15′51″E |
| Phitsanulok Unity | Phitsanulok (Mueang) | Phitsanulok PAO. Stadium | 16°50′48″N 100°15′51″E |
| TPF Uttaradit | Uttaradit (Mueang) | Uttaradit Provincial Stadium | 17°36′34″N 100°06′39″E |

=== Personnel and sponsoring ===
Note: Flags indicate national team as has been defined under FIFA eligibility rules. Players may hold more than one non-FIFA nationality; Club dissolved during season would shown by grey background.

| Team | Manager | Captain | Kit |
|---|---|---|---|
| Chattrakan City | (Thailand) Ronachai Jinakate | | |
| Chiangmai | (Thailand) Amaret Amonlertsak | | |
| Chiangrai City | (Thailand) Nantawat Tansopa | | (Thailand) Zeta Jersey |
| Kamphaengphet | (Thailand) Sek-san Siripong | | |
| Khelang United | (Thailand) Issawa Singthong | | (Thailand) Zeta Jersey |
| Maejo United | (Thailand) Chalongchai Leelahacheewa | | (Thailand) Acono Sport |
| Nakhon Sawan See Khwae City | (Thailand) Sanong Taengngam | | (Thailand) Zeta Jersey |
| Northern Nakhon Mae Sot United | (Thailand) Somkiat Fongpech | | (Thailand) 2S Sport |
| Phitsanulok | (Thailand) Kritsana Taiwan | | (Thailand) Ego Sport |
| Phitsanulok Unity | (Thailand) Chaiwat Puengsiri | | (Thailand) H2H Sport |
| TPF Uttaradit | (Thailand) Nitipong Saiyasit | | (Thailand) Zeta Jersey |

=== Foreign players ===
A T3 team could register 3 foreign players from foreign players all around the world. A team can use 3 foreign players on the field in each game.

Note :
(substituted off) : players who released during second leg transfer window;
(substituted on) : players who registered during second leg transfer window.

| AFC member countries players. |
| CAF member countries players. |
| CONCACAF member countries players. |
| CONMEBOL member countries players. |
| OFC member countries players. |
| UEFA member countries players. |
| No foreign player registered. |

| Club | Leg | Player 1 | Player 2 | Player 3 |
|---|---|---|---|---|
| Chattrakan City | 1st | (Brazil) Víctor Luis Ferreira Cabral (substituted off) | (Iran) Mahdi Zarenezhad Hazehjan | (Japan) Kazutaka Sato |
| Chattrakan City | 2nd | (Nigeria) Oibo Okhai Godspower (substituted on) | (Iran) Mahdi Zarenezhad Hazehjan | (Japan) Kazutaka Sato |
| Chiangmai | 1st | (Brazil) Henrique Fernandes Campos Santos (substituted off) | (Brazil) Felipe Micael (substituted off) |
| Chiangmai | 2nd | (South Korea) Park Sang-myeong (substituted on) | (China) Liu Chaoyang (substituted on) |
| Chiangrai City | 1st | | (Egypt) Mohamed Samy Abdelkawy Abouelseoud (substituted off) | (South Korea) Lee Ki-joon (substituted off) |
| Chiangrai City | 2nd | (South Korea) Jung Seung-yeon (substituted on) | (South Korea) Sim Seung-hyeon (substituted on) | (South Korea) Lee Gi-been (substituted on) |
| Kamphaengphet | 1st | (United States) Jeremy Zielinski (substituted off) | (Brazil) Gustavo (substituted off) | (Japan) Satoshi Kurokawa |
| Kamphaengphet | 2nd | (Canada) Adam James Malekos (substituted on) | (South Korea) Cho Woo-hyuk (substituted on) | (Japan) Satoshi Kurokawa |
| Khelang United | 1st |
| Khelang United | 2nd | (Japan) Taku Hishida (substituted on) | (South Korea) Jung Seung-min (substituted on) | (South Korea) Chung Min-seo (substituted on) |
| Maejo United | 1st | (France) Adel Gafaiti (substituted off) | (Japan) Yuto Yoshijima (substituted off) | (Brazil) Douglas Mineiro |
| Maejo United | 2nd | (Nigeria) Debiro Dzarma Bata (substituted on) | (South Korea) Seo Min-guk (substituted on) | (Brazil) Douglas Mineiro |
| Nakhon Sawan See Khwae City | 1st | (Nigeria) Debiro Dzarma Bata (substituted off) | (Japan) Issei Kikuchi (substituted off) | (South Korea) Park Jun-do (substituted off) |
| Nakhon Sawan See Khwae City | 2nd | | (Nigeria) James Oise Jesuikhode (substituted on) | (Algeria) Amghar Mohammed (substituted on) |
| Northern Nakhon Mae Sot United | 1st | (Egypt) Hazem Mohamed Mahmoud Mohamed (substituted off) | (Cameroon) Tewidikum Tah Nivan | (Togo) Ekue Andre Houma |
| Northern Nakhon Mae Sot United | 2nd | (Cameroon) Cedrick Platini Kaham (substituted on) | (Cameroon) Tewidikum Tah Nivan | (Togo) Ekue Andre Houma |
| Phitsanulok | 1st | (Russia) Erik Zaerko (substituted off) | (South Korea) Cho Woo-hyuk (substituted off) | (Nigeria) Ekene Victor Azike |
| Phitsanulok | 2nd | (Brazil) Jhonata Pereira dos Santos (substituted on) | (Nigeria) Bright Friday (substituted on) | (Nigeria) Ekene Victor Azike |
| Phitsanulok Unity | 1st | (Brazil) Guilherme Moreira (substituted off) | (Ivory Coast) Diarrassouba Hamed de Silci (substituted off) | (Ivory Coast) Diarra Junior Aboubacar (substituted off) |
| Phitsanulok Unity | 2nd | | (Brazil) Luan Borges Machado Martins (substituted on) | (Argentina) Santiago Corral (substituted on) |
| TPF Uttaradit | 1st | (Brazil) Emerson da Silva Tavares (substituted off) | (Nigeria) Timothy Chiemerie Okereke (substituted off) | (Russia) Ruslan Zaerko |
| TPF Uttaradit | 2nd | (Ivory Coast) Diarra Junior Aboubacar (substituted on) | (Ghana) Oscar Plape (substituted on) | (Russia) Ruslan Zaerko |

== League table ==
=== Standings ===
| Pos | Team | Pld | W | D | L | GF | GA | GD | Pts | Qualification or relegation |
|---|---|---|---|---|---|---|---|---|---|---|
| 1 | Maejo United (C, Q) | 20 | 11 | 7 | 2 | 31 | 14 | +17 | 40 | Qualification to the National Championship stage |
| 2 | Khelang United (Q) | 20 | 11 | 4 | 5 | 33 | 21 | +12 | 37 | Qualification to the National Championship stage |
| 3 | Chiangmai | 20 | 9 | 8 | 3 | 39 | 22 | +17 | 35 | |
| 4 | TPF Uttaradit | 20 | 9 | 6 | 5 | 31 | 28 | +3 | 33 | |
| 5 | Phitsanulok | 20 | 10 | 1 | 9 | 22 | 19 | +3 | 31 | |
| 6 | Nakhon Sawan See Khwae City | 20 | 6 | 8 | 6 | 22 | 22 | 0 | 26 | |
| 7 | Chiangrai City | 20 | 7 | 3 | 10 | 26 | 30 | −4 | 24 | |
| 8 | Northern Nakhon Mae Sot United | 20 | 6 | 4 | 10 | 20 | 31 | −11 | 22 | |
| 9 | Kamphaengphet | 20 | 6 | 3 | 11 | 15 | 30 | −15 | 21 | |
| 10 | Chattrakan City | 20 | 5 | 5 | 10 | 21 | 30 | −9 | 20 | |
| 11 | Phitsanulok Unity (R) | 20 | 4 | 3 | 13 | 23 | 36 | −13 | 15 | Relegation to the Thailand Semi-pro League |

Source: Thai League
Rules for classification: 1) Points; 2) Head-to-head points; 3) Head-to-head goal difference; 4) Head-to-head goal scored; 5) Overall goal difference; 6) Overall goal scored; 7) Fair play points; 8) Play-off without extra time).
(C) Champions; (Q) Qualified for the phase indicated; (R) Relegated

=== Positions by round ===
| Team ╲ Round | 1 | 2 | 3 | 4 | 5 | 6 | 7 | 8 | 9 | 10 | 11 | 12 | 13 | 14 | 15 | 16 | 17 | 18 | 19 | 20 | 21 | 22 |
|---|---|---|---|---|---|---|---|---|---|---|---|---|---|---|---|---|---|---|---|---|---|---|
| Maejo United | 2 | 2 | 3 | 2 | 2 | 2 | 2 | 1 | 1 | 1 | 1 | 2 | 1 | 1 | 1 | 1 | 1 | 1 | 1 | 1 | 1 | 1 |
| Khelang United | 7 | 10 | 8 | 5 | 8 | 6 | 4 | 4 | 4 | 3 | 4 | 4 | 5 | 5 | 4 | 3 | 4 | 3 | 3 | 2 | 2 | 2 |
| Chiangmai | 9 | 4 | 4 | 3 | 4 | 4 | 3 | 3 | 2 | 2 | 2 | 1 | 2 | 2 | 3 | 5 | 2 | 2 | 2 | 3 | 3 | 3 |
| TPF Uttaradit | 1 | 1 | 1 | 1 | 1 | 1 | 1 | 2 | 3 | 4 | 3 | 3 | 3 | 3 | 2 | 2 | 3 | 4 | 5 | 5 | 5 | 4 |
| Phitsanulok | 8 | 3 | 6 | 8 | 9 | 10 | 9 | 10 | 8 | 5 | 5 | 5 | 4 | 4 | 5 | 4 | 5 | 5 | 4 | 4 | 4 | 5 |
| Nakhon Sawan See Khwae City | 5 | 7 | 9 | 7 | 5 | 7 | 6 | 5 | 6 | 6 | 8 | 7 | 7 | 7 | 7 | 8 | 7 | 7 | 7 | 6 | 6 | 6 |
| Chiangrai City | 6 | 9 | 11 | 9 | 6 | 9 | 10 | 8 | 9 | 9 | 10 | 9 | 9 | 8 | 10 | 10 | 11 | 10 | 9 | 7 | 8 | 7 |
| Northern Nakhon Mae Sot United | 11 | 11 | 10 | 11 | 11 | 11 | 11 | 11 | 11 | 11 | 11 | 11 | 11 | 10 | 8 | 7 | 8 | 9 | 8 | 10 | 7 | 8 |
| Kamphaengphet | 10 | 6 | 2 | 4 | 3 | 3 | 5 | 7 | 5 | 8 | 6 | 6 | 6 | 6 | 6 | 6 | 6 | 6 | 6 | 8 | 9 | 9 |
| Chattrakan City | 4 | 8 | 5 | 6 | 7 | 5 | 7 | 6 | 7 | 7 | 7 | 8 | 8 | 9 | 11 | 11 | 9 | 8 | 10 | 9 | 10 | 10 |
| Phitsanulok Unity | 3 | 5 | 7 | 10 | 10 | 8 | 8 | 9 | 10 | 10 | 9 | 10 | 10 | 11 | 9 | 9 | 10 | 11 | 11 | 11 | 11 | 11 |

Source: Thai League
= Qualification to the National Championship stage; = Relegation to the Thailand Semi-pro League

=== Results by round ===
| Team ╲ Round | 1 | 2 | 3 | 4 | 5 | 6 | 7 | 8 | 9 | 10 | 11 | 12 | 13 | 14 | 15 | 16 | 17 | 18 | 19 | 20 | 21 | 22 |
|---|---|---|---|---|---|---|---|---|---|---|---|---|---|---|---|---|---|---|---|---|---|---|
| Maejo United | W | N | D | W | W | D | W | W | W | D | D | N | W | W | D | D | W | W | D | L | L | W |
| Khelang United | N | L | W | D | L | W | W | D | W | W | L | D | L | W | D | W | L | W | W | W | W | N |
| Chiangmai | L | W | D | W | N | D | W | W | W | W | D | D | L | D | N | D | W | W | D | L | D | W |
| TPF Uttaradit | W | W | N | W | W | W | L | D | L | D | D | W | N | D | W | D | L | L | L | D | W | W |
| Phitsanulok | W | L | L | L | L | W | N | L | W | W | W | W | W | D | L | W | N | L | W | W | L | L |
| Nakhon Sawan See Khwae City | D | D | D | W | L | D | W | N | L | D | L | D | W | L | L | D | W | N | L | W | D | W |
| Chiangrai City | L | W | W | L | L | L | D | L | D | L | N | D | W | L | L | L | L | W | W | W | N | W |
| Northern Nakhon Mae Sot United | L | L | D | L | L | L | W | D | L | N | L | W | L | W | W | W | D | L | D | N | W | L |
| Kamphaengphet | L | W | W | L | W | N | D | L | D | L | W | L | W | D | W | N | L | L | L | L | L | L |
| Chattrakan City | D | L | W | L | L | W | L | W | N | D | D | L | L | L | L | L | W | W | N | D | D | L |
| Phitsanulok Unity | W | L | L | N | L | W | L | L | L | L | W | L | L | N | W | L | D | L | D | L | D | L |

Source: Thai League
N = No match; W = Won; D = Drawn; L = Lost

=== Results ===
| Home \ Away | CTC | CMI | CRC | KPP | KLU | MJU | NSK | NMS | PLK | PLU | UTD |
|---|---|---|---|---|---|---|---|---|---|---|---|
| Chattrakan City | — | 1–1 | 3–1 | 1–2 | 2–1 | 0–4 | 2–2 | 0–2 | 0–1 | 3–0 | 1–1 |
| Chiangmai | 1–1 | — | 0–1 | 2–0 | 2–0 | 1–1 | 1–1 | 4–2 | 1–1 | 4–2 | 5–1 |
| Chiangrai City | 2–0 | 2–3 | — | 3–0 | 1–3 | 0–2 | 1–1 | 1–0 | 0–1 | 0–2 | 1–1 |
| Kamphaengphet | 1–0 | 0–2 | 2–2 | — | 1–0 | 0–2 | 2–2 | 2–1 | 0–2 | 2–1 | 1–4 |
| Khelang United | 1–0 | 3–3 | 1–0 | 2–0 | — | 0–3 | 3–0 | 4–0 | 1–0 | 2–0 | 1–0 |
| Maejo United | 2–0 | 0–0 | 2–0 | 2–0 | 2–2 | — | 1–1 | 1–0 | 1–0 | 2–2 | 0–3 |
| Nakhon Sawan See Khwae City | 2–0 | 1–0 | 1–0 | 1–0 | 1–1 | 2–1 | — | 0–1 | 0–1 | 0–1 | 0–1 |
| Northern Nakhon Mae Sot United | 1–2 | 2–2 | 2–1 | 2–1 | 1–1 | 2–2 | 0–2 | — | 2–1 | 1–1 | 0–3 |
| Phitsanulok | 2–0 | 1–2 | 2–3 | 1–0 | 3–0 | 0–1 | 2–1 | 1–0 | — | 0–3 | 1–2 |
| Phitsanulok Unity | 1–3 | 2–1 | 2–4 | 0–1 | 2–4 | 0–1 | 1–1 | 0–1 | 1–2 | — | 2–3 |
| TPF Uttaradit | 2–2 | 0–4 | 2–3 | 0–0 | 0–3 | 1–1 | 3–3 | 2–0 | 1–0 | 1–0 | — |

Source: Thai League
Legend: Blue = home team win; Yellow = draw; Red = away team win.
For upcoming matches, an "a" indicates there is an article about the rivalry between the two participants.

== Season statistics ==
=== Top scorers ===
:As of 30 March 2025.

| Rank | Player | Club | Goals |
|---|---|---|---|
| 1 | (Thailand) Mathas Kajaree | Khelang United | 15 |
| 2 | (Brazil) Douglas Mineiro | Maejo United | 13 |
| 3 | (Nigeria) James Oise Jesuikhode | Nakhon Sawan See Khwae City (8 Goals) | 8 |
| 4 | (Thailand) Wongwat Joroentaveesuk | Chiangrai City | 7 |
| 4 | (Ivory Coast) Diarra Junior Aboubacar | Phitsanulok Unity (3 Goals); TPF Uttaradit (4 Goals) | 7 |

=== Hat-tricks ===
| Player | For | Against | Result | Date |
|---|---|---|---|---|
| (Thailand) Mathas Kajaree | Khelang United | Chiangmai | 3–3 (H) | 18 January 2025 |
| (Brazil) Douglas Mineiro | Maejo United | Chattrakan City | 0–4 (A) | 2 February 2025 |
| (Nigeria) James Oise Jesuikhode | Nakhon Sawan See Khwae City | TPF Uttaradit | 3–3 (A) | 15 February 2025 |

Notes: (H) = Home team; (A) = Away team

=== Clean sheets ===
As of 30 March 2025.

| Rank | Player | Club | Clean sheets |
|---|---|---|---|
| 1 | (Thailand) Pathomtat Sudprasert | Maejo United | 11 |
| 2 | (Thailand) Nattapon Junlanan | Khelang United | 9 |
| 3 | (Thailand) Weerapong Lapkhaw | TPF Uttaradit | 5 |
| 4 | (Thailand) Surasak Thongoon | Chiangmai (3) | 3 |
| 4 | (Thailand) Pipat Prakongpan | Chiangrai City (3) | 3 |
| 4 | (Thailand) Jirasak Kunnapan | Kamphaengphet | 3 |
| 4 | (Thailand) Chaturong Singjanusong | Phitsanulok | 3 |

== Attendances ==
=== Overall statistical table ===
| Pos | Team | Total | High | Low | Average | Change |
|---|---|---|---|---|---|---|
| 1 | Chiangmai | 7,998 | 1,118 | 518 | 800 | −61.8%^{↓} |
| 2 | Phitsanulok | 7,672 | 1,285 | 326 | 767 | −21.5% |
| 3 | TPF Uttaradit | 3,394 | 704 | 0 | 377 | +42.3% |
| 4 | Phitsanulok Unity | 2,678 | 1,260 | 0 | 298 | +41.9% |
| 5 | Nakhon Sawan See Khwae City | 2,664 | 700 | 0 | 296 | +64.4% |
| 6 | Chattrakan City | 1,660 | 509 | 0 | 184 | −35.0%^{↑} |
| 7 | Northern Nakhon Mae Sot United | 1,378 | 177 | 104 | 138 | −29.6% |
| 8 | Kamphaengphet | 1,053 | 221 | 0 | 132 | +8.2% |
| 9 | Khelang United | 1,241 | 326 | 58 | 124 | −24.4% |
| 10 | Maejo United | 1,101 | 382 | 32 | 110 | −24.1% |
| 11 | Chiangrai City | 994 | 225 | 33 | 99 | +32.0% |
| | League total | 31,833 | 1,285 | 0 | 306 | −1.3% |

Updated to games played on 30 March 2025
Source: Thai League

=== Attendances by home match played ===
| Team \ Match played | 1 | 2 | 3 | 4 | 5 | 6 | 7 | 8 | 9 | 10 | Total |
|---|---|---|---|---|---|---|---|---|---|---|---|
| Chattrakan City | 103 | 313 | 36 | 273 | Unk.3 | 509 | 102 | 88 | 83 | 153 | 1,660 |
| Chiangmai | 758 | 657 | 1,118 | 718 | 518 | 830 | 1,145 | 618 | 718 | 918 | 7,998 |
| Chiangrai City | 200 | 33 | 129 | 95 | 225 | 60 | 43 | 57 | 102 | 50 | 994 |
| Kamphaengphet | 105 | Unk.1 | 120 | 122 | 84 | Unk.4 | 168 | 131 | 221 | 102 | 1,053 |
| Khelang United | 163 | 112 | 107 | 81 | 160 | 92 | 74 | 68 | 58 | 326 | 1,241 |
| Maejo United | 32 | 72 | 33 | 123 | 100 | 58 | 382 | 136 | 40 | 125 | 1,101 |
| Nakhon Sawan See Khwae City | 700 | Unk.2 | 40 | 168 | 420 | 60 | 267 | 352 | 287 | 370 | 2,664 |
| Northern Nakhon Mae Sot United | 124 | 160 | 120 | 164 | 138 | 104 | 120 | 106 | 165 | 177 | 1,378 |
| Phitsanulok | 881 | 1,285 | 791 | 482 | 824 | 678 | 767 | 1,073 | 565 | 326 | 7,672 |
| Phitsanulok Unity | 296 | 140 | 100 | 108 | 67 | 177 | 1,260 | 180 | 350 | Unk.6 | 2,678 |
| TPF Uttaradit | 431 | 704 | 523 | 335 | 252 | 288 | 432 | 237 | Unk.5 | 192 | 3,394 |

Note:
Unk.1 Some error of T3 official match report 5 October 2024 (Kamphaengphet 1–4 TPF Uttaradit).
Unk.2 Some error of T3 official match report 19 October 2024 (Nakhon Sawan See Khwae City 0–1 TPF Uttaradit).
Unk.3 Some error of T3 official match report 17 November 2024 (Chattrakan City 1–1 TPF Uttaradit).
Unk.4 Some error of T3 official match report 26 January 2025 (Kamphaengphet 2–1 Phitsanulok Unity).
Unk.5 Some error of T3 official match report 16 March 2025 (TPF Uttaradit 2–2 Chattrakan City).
Unk.6 Some error of T3 official match report 22 March 2025 (Phitsanulok Unity 1–1 Nakhon Sawan See Khwae City).
