= 2024–25 Thai League 3 =

8th season of the Thai League 3

- Season: 2024–25
- Dates: 14 September 2024 – 22 June 2025
- Champions: Rasisalai United
- Promoted: Rasisalai United; Songkhla; Pattani
- Relegated: Phitsanulok Unity; AUU Inter Bangkok; Dome; Samut Prakan; Maraleina; Kanchanaburi City; Phatthalung; Yala City

The 2024–25 Thai League 3 marks the eighth season of the Thai League 3, Thailand's third-tier professional football league. This season retains the structure of 69 clubs divided into six regional groups, with an adjusted regional distribution to better reflect geographical locations.

For the 2024–25 season, the regions are organized as follows: Northern (11 clubs), Central (11 clubs), Northeastern (11 clubs), Eastern (12 clubs), Western (12 clubs), and Southern (12 clubs). Notably, the Bangkok Metropolitan Region has been replaced by the Central Region. Clubs previously competing in the Bangkok Metropolitan, Eastern, and Western regions have been reallocated to the new regional groups based on their geographical positions.

The league maintains a two-stage format, beginning with the Regional Stage, where clubs compete within their respective regions. The 2024–25 season kicks off on 14 September 2024 with the first match of the Regional Stage, and the top two clubs from each region, the champions and runners-up, advance to the National Championship Stage. This final phase, featuring 12 clubs, culminates with the second leg of the national final on TBD, marking the official close of the season. In this phase, clubs compete for the national title and the opportunity for promotion to Thai League 2 for the next season. By reorganizing the regional groups, Thai League 3 continues to play a crucial role in the development of football nationwide, ensuring a fair and competitive environment for all participating clubs. This revised regional structure aims to promote competitive balance and foster the growth of football across all regions of Thailand.

== Seasonal Changes ==
The 2024–25 Thai League 3 season introduces several significant changes from the previous season, impacting club composition, league structure, and regional distribution.

=== Relegation from Thai League 2 ===
Chiangmai, who originally secured their spot in Thai League 2, were relegated to Thai League 3 after failing to meet the club licensing standards. As a result, Kasetsart, which had the best ranking among the clubs in the relegation zone, remained in Thai League 2 instead. Toko Customs United (formerly Customs United) and Krabi were also relegated to Thai League 3 and will compete in the Eastern and Southern Regions, respectively. Chiangmai will compete in the Northern Region.

=== Promotions from Thailand Semi-pro League ===
Six clubs have earned promotion to Thai League 3 from the Thailand Semi-pro League:

- Chattrakan City (Northern Region)
- Dome (Central Region)
- Roi Et PB United (Northeastern Region)
- Padriew City (Eastern Region)
- Samut Songkhram City (Western Region)
- Yala City (Southern Region)

=== Promotion to Thai League 2 ===
The top three clubs from the 2023–24 Thai League 3 season have been promoted to Thai League 2: Bangkok (National champion), Sisaket United (National runners-up), and Mahasarakham SBT (National 3rd place).

=== Clubs relegated due to club licensing failures ===
Several clubs from Thai League 3 that met competitive criteria failed to pass the club licensing for the 2024–25 season, resulting in their relegation to the Thailand Semi-pro League:

- Kongkrailas United (Northern Region)
- Rongseemaechaithanachotiwat Phayao (Northern Region)
- Chanthaburi United (Eastern Region)
- MH Nakhon Si City (Southern Region)

Consequently, Nakhon Sawan See Khwae City, which finished last in the Northern Region, was retained in Thai League 3 due to these failures.

=== Clubs relegated due to finishing last in their regions ===
- Nakhon Ratchasima United (Northeastern Region)
- The iCON RSU (Central Region, formerly Bangkok Metropolitan Region)
- Prachinburi City (Eastern Region)
- Chainat United (Western Region)
- Trang (Southern Region)

These clubs have been relegated to the Thailand Semi-pro League for the 2025 season.

=== Regional redistribution and renaming ===
A significant change this season is the renaming of the Bangkok Metropolitan Region to the Central Region. This renaming was part of a broader effort to align the regions more closely with the geographical locations of the clubs. To further support this adjustment:

- Samut Prakan, which previously competed in the Bangkok Metropolitan Region (currently Central Region), has been moved to the Eastern Region.
- Nonthaburi United, Royal Thai Army, Samut Sakhon City, Thonburi United, and VRN Muangnont have been moved from the Bangkok Metropolitan Region (currently Central Region) to the Western Region.
- Angthong, Lopburi City, PTU Pathum Thani, and Saraburi United have been moved from the Western Region to the Central Region (formerly Bangkok Metropolitan Region).

These changes ensure that clubs are placed in regions that better reflect their actual geographical locations, promoting a more balanced and competitive league structure. The renaming of the Bangkok Metropolitan Region to the Central Region, along with the redistribution of clubs, is intended to create clarity and prevent confusion as the league continues to evolve.

=== Club name and logo changes ===
Several clubs have rebranded or changed their logos for the 2024–25 season:

- Phitsanulok Unity, a club in the Northern Region, redesigned its logo from a field rat to a fighting cock, symbolizing King Naresuan the Great's legendary fighting cock.
- TPF Uttaradit (formerly Uttaradit Saksiam), a club in the Northern Region, changed both its name and logo, retaining the iconic image of Phraya Phichai.
- Kasem Bundit University, a club in the Central Region, underwent a full logo redesign to modernize its image.
- ACDC, a club in the Eastern Region, updated its logo's typography to a more modern design.
- Navy, a club in the Eastern Region, introduced a completely new logo that emphasizes its naval roots but with a contemporary look.
- Toko Customs United (formerly Customs United), a club in the Eastern Region, updated its logo, changing the text to reflect its new name.
- Nonthaburi United, a club in the Western Region, changed its logo, replacing the bear-and-durian tree design with a crow, representing strength and resilience.
- Pattani, a club in the Southern Region, updated its logo by changing the cannon from black to gold, adding two hibiscus flowers, and incorporating a floral pattern.
- PSU Surat Thani City (formerly Wiang Sa Surat Thani City), a club in the Southern Region, updated its logo, keeping the Arowana fish but changing the text to reflect its new name.

== Regional stage ==
The Regional Stage of the 2024–25 Thai League 3 includes 69 clubs divided into six regions: Northern (11 clubs), Central (11 clubs), Northeastern (11 clubs), Eastern (12 clubs), Western (12 clubs), and Southern (12 clubs). Each region operates in a round-robin format where clubs play each other in both home and away matches. The top two clubs from each region, the champion and the runner-up, qualify for the National Championship Stage. This stage serves to determine the regional winners and which clubs advance to the national competition.

=== Northern region ===
League table

Pos	Team	Pld	W	D	L	GF	GA	GD	Pts	Qualification or relegation
1	Maejo United (C, Q)	20	11	7	2	31	14	+17	40	Qualification to the National Championship stage
2	Khelang United (Q)	20	11	4	5	33	21	+12	37	Qualification to the National Championship stage
3	Chiangmai	20	9	8	3	39	22	+17	35	
4	TPF Uttaradit	20	9	6	5	31	28	+3	33	
5	Phitsanulok	20	10	1	9	22	19	+3	31	
6	Nakhon Sawan See Khwae City	20	6	8	6	22	22	0	26	
7	Chiangrai City	20	7	3	10	26	30	−4	24	
8	Northern Nakhon Mae Sot United	20	6	4	10	20	31	−11	22	
9	Kamphaengphet	20	6	3	11	15	30	−15	21	
10	Chattrakan City	20	5	5	10	21	30	−9	20	
11	Phitsanulok Unity (R)	20	4	3	13	23	36	−13	15	Relegation to the Thailand Semi-pro League

Source: Thai League
Rules for classification: 1) Points; 2) Head-to-head points; 3) Head-to-head goal difference; 4) Head-to-head goal scored; 5) Overall goal difference; 6) Overall goal scored; 7) Fair play points; 8) Play-off without extra time).
(C) Champions; (Q) Qualified for the phase indicated; (R) Relegated

=== Central region ===
League table

Pos	Team	Pld	W	D	L	GF	GA	GD	Pts	Qualification or relegation
1	Lopburi City (C, Q)	20	12	5	3	41	21	+20	41 (Note: Lopburi City ahead on head-to-head points record; Lopburi City 4 pts, North Bangkok University 1 pt.)	Qualification to the National Championship stage
2	North Bangkok University (Q)	20	11	8	1	35	14	+21	41	Qualification to the National Championship stage
3	Kasem Bundit University	20	10	5	5	26	15	+11	35	
4	Prime Bangkok	20	8	6	6	34	28	+6	30	
5	Royal Thai Air Force	20	5	10	5	22	21	+1	25 (Note: Royal Thai Air Force ahead on head-to-head record; Royal Thai Air Force 3 pts (GD +1), PTU Pathum Thani 3 pts (GD -1).)	
6	PTU Pathum Thani	20	7	4	9	17	29	−12	25	
7	Chamchuri United	20	6	5	9	26	30	−4	23	
8	AUU Inter Bangkok (R)	20	4	7	9	28	29	−1	19 (Note: AUU Inter Bangkok ahead on head-to-head points record; AUU Inter Bangkok 4 pts, Angthong 1 pt.)	Relegation to the Thailand Semi-pro League (Note: AUU Inter Bangkok and Dome were administratively relegated to the 2026 Thailand Semi-pro League for failing to meet club licensing standards.)
9	Angthong	20	3	10	7	16	26	−10	19	
10	Dome (R)	20	3	9	8	17	32	−15	18	Relegation to the Thailand Semi-pro League
11	Saraburi United (Note: Saraburi United remained in the league after AUU Inter Bangkok and Dome failed to meet the club licensing criteria for the 2025–26 season, resulting in Saraburi United retaining their spot.)	20	3	7	10	22	39	−17	16	

Source: Thai League
Rules for classification: 1) Points; 2) Head-to-head points; 3) Head-to-head goal difference; 4) Head-to-head goal scored; 5) Overall goal difference; 6) Overall goal scored; 7) Fair play points; 8) Play-off without extra time).
(C) Champions; (Q) Qualified for the phase indicated; (R) Relegated

=== Northeastern region ===
League table

Pos	Team	Pld	W	D	L	GF	GA	GD	Pts	Qualification or relegation
1	Rasisalai United (C, Q)	20	16	3	1	66	14	+52	51	Qualification to the National Championship stage
2	Khon Kaen (Q)	20	12	4	4	32	14	+18	40	Qualification to the National Championship stage
3	Udon United	20	9	9	2	28	13	+15	36	
4	Ubon Kruanapat	20	10	3	7	31	20	+11	33	
5	Muang Loei United	20	6	8	6	22	22	0	26	
6	Roi Et PB United	20	7	3	10	25	31	−6	24	
7	Yasothon	20	5	5	10	21	39	−18	20	
8	Suranaree Black Cat	20	5	4	11	17	32	−15	19	
9	Surin City	20	2	12	6	14	19	−5	18 (Note: The head-to-head record is tied; Surin City 2 pts (GD 0, GF 1), Surin Khong Chee Mool 2 pts (GD 0, GF 1). Surin City is ahead on the overall goals difference.)	
10	Surin Khong Chee Mool	20	5	3	12	23	51	−28	18	
11	Khon Kaen Mordindang (Note: Following Rasisalai United's promotion to Thai League 2, Khon Kaen Mordindang remained in Thai League 3 to preserve the number of participating clubs in the Northeastern region.)	20	5	2	13	22	46	−24	17	

Source: Thai League
Rules for classification: 1) Points; 2) Head-to-head points; 3) Head-to-head goal difference; 4) Head-to-head goal scored; 5) Overall goal difference; 6) Overall goal scored; 7) Fair play points; 8) Play-off without extra time).
(C) Champions; (Q) Qualified for the phase indicated

=== Eastern region ===
League table

Pos	Team	Pld	W	D	L	GF	GA	GD	Pts	Qualification or relegation
1	Navy (C, Q)	22	15	6	1	49	14	+35	51	Qualification to the National Championship stage
2	Fleet (Q)	22	13	6	3	38	19	+19	45	Qualification to the National Championship stage
3	Bankhai United	22	9	9	4	31	16	+15	36	
4	Saimit Kabin United	22	9	7	6	25	23	+2	34	
5	ACDC	22	9	5	8	34	31	+3	32 (Note: ACDC ahead on head-to-head record; ACDC 3 pts (GD +1), Pluakdaeng United 3 pts (GD -1).)	
6	Pluakdaeng United	22	8	8	6	27	23	+4	32	
7	Chachoengsao Hi-Tek	22	7	8	7	19	20	−1	29	
8	Padriew City	22	7	5	10	26	30	−4	26	
9	BFB Pattaya City	22	7	4	11	26	36	−10	25	
10	Marines	22	5	5	12	26	43	−17	20	
11	Toko Customs United	22	4	7	11	18	28	−10	19	
12	Samut Prakan (R)	22	2	4	16	10	46	−36	10	Relegation to the Thailand Semi-pro League

Source: Thai League
Rules for classification: 1) Points; 2) Head-to-head points; 3) Head-to-head goal difference; 4) Head-to-head goal scored; 5) Overall goal difference; 6) Overall goal scored; 7) Fair play points; 8) Play-off without extra time).
(C) Champions; (Q) Qualified for the phase indicated; (R) Relegated

=== Western region ===
League table

Pos	Team	Pld	W	D	L	GF	GA	GD	Pts	Qualification or relegation
1	Samut Sakhon City (C, Q)	22	16	3	3	49	19	+30	51 (Note: The head-to-head record is tied; Samut Sakhon City 3 pts (GD 0, GF 4), Thonburi United 3 pts (GD 0, GF 4). Samut Sakhon City is ahead on the overall goals difference.)	Qualification to the National Championship stage
2	Thonburi United (Q)	22	16	3	3	54	26	+28	51	Qualification to the National Championship stage
3	Rajpracha	22	13	5	4	38	23	+15	44	
4	Thap Luang United	22	11	7	4	45	22	+23	40	
5	VRN Muangnont	22	7	9	6	30	22	+8	30	
6	Samut Songkhram City	22	7	6	9	34	35	−1	27	
7	Hua Hin City	22	7	5	10	41	52	−11	26 (Note: Hua Hin City ahead on head-to-head points record; Hua Hin City 4 pts, Nonthaburi United 1 pt.)	
8	Nonthaburi United	22	7	5	10	28	31	−3	26	
9	Assumption United	22	6	4	12	25	44	−19	22	
10	Maraleina (R)	22	3	7	12	18	38	−20	16	Relegation to the Thailand Semi-pro League (Note: Maraleina was administratively relegated to the 2026 Thailand Semi-pro League for failing to meet club licensing standards.)
11	Royal Thai Army	22	2	9	11	23	40	−17	15	
12	Kanchanaburi City (R)	22	3	5	14	20	53	−33	14	Relegation to the Thailand Semi-pro League

Source: Thai League
Rules for classification: 1) Points; 2) Head-to-head points; 3) Head-to-head goal difference; 4) Head-to-head goal scored; 5) Overall goal difference; 6) Overall goal scored; 7) Fair play points; 8) Play-off without extra time).
(C) Champions; (Q) Qualified for the phase indicated; (R) Relegated

=== Southern region ===
League table

Pos	Team	Pld	W	D	L	GF	GA	GD	Pts	Qualification or relegation
1	Songkhla (C, Q)	22	12	8	2	24	9	+15	44	Qualification to the National Championship stage
2	Pattani (Q)	22	11	6	5	26	18	+8	39	Qualification to the National Championship stage
3	Yala	22	9	8	5	19	15	+4	35	
4	Nara United	22	8	10	4	24	19	+5	34	
5	Satun	22	8	9	5	19	18	+1	33	
6	Muang Trang United	22	8	8	6	34	28	+6	32	
7	Phatthalung (R)	22	7	9	6	23	18	+5	30	Relegation to the Thailand Semi-pro League (Note: Phatthalung was administratively relegated to the 2026 Thailand Semi-pro League for failing to meet club licensing standards.)
8	PSU Surat Thani City	22	7	8	7	30	26	+4	29	
9	Krabi	22	6	4	12	25	32	−7	22	
10	Ranong United	22	6	3	13	18	29	−11	21	
11	Phuket Andaman	22	4	5	13	18	35	−17	17	
12	Yala City (R)	22	2	10	10	13	26	−13	16	Relegation to the Thailand Semi-pro League

Source: Thai League
Rules for classification: 1) Points; 2) Head-to-head points; 3) Head-to-head goal difference; 4) Head-to-head goal scored; 5) Overall goal difference; 6) Overall goal scored; 7) Fair play points; 8) Play-off without extra time).
(C) Champions; (Q) Qualified for the phase indicated; (R) Relegated

== National Championship stage ==
The 2024–25 National Championship Stage features 12 clubs from the Regional Stage, including champions and runners-up from six regions. These clubs are divided into three groups: Group A (Northern and Central), Group B (Northeastern and Eastern), and Group C (Western and Southern). Each group plays in a round-robin, home-and-away format. The top club from each group advances to the semi-finals, along with the best second-placed club from all groups.

The knockout stage, held over two legs, uses aggregate scoring, with the away goals rule applied in case of a tie. If still level, extra time and penalties will decide the winner. Semi-final winners reach the final and secure promotion to Thai League 2, while the semi-final losers compete for third place, with the winner also earning promotion. This format ensures strong competition and offers promotion opportunities to the top clubs.

=== Group stage ===
Group A

Pos	Team	Pld	W	D	L	GF	GA	GD	Pts	Qualification	NBU	LBC	MJU	KLU
1	North Bangkok University (Q)	6	3	3	0	10	4	+6	12	Advance to knockout stage	—	3–1	0–0	1–1
2	Lopburi City	6	2	1	3	9	12	−3	7 (Note: Lopburi City ahead on head-to-head points record; Lopburi City 4 pts, Maejo United 1 pt.)		0–3	—	3–3	1–2
3	Maejo United	6	1	4	1	8	9	−1	7		1–1	0–2	—	2–2
4	Khelang United	6	1	2	3	8	10	−2	5		1–2	1–2	1–2	—

Source: Thai League
Rules for classification: 1) Points; 2) Head-to-head points; 3) Head-to-head goal difference; 4) Head-to-head goal scored; 5) Overall goal difference; 6) Overall goal scored; 7) Fair play points; 8) Play-off without extra time).
(Q) Qualified for the phase indicated
Notes:

Group B

Pos	Team	Pld	W	D	L	GF	GA	GD	Pts	Qualification	RSL	FLT	NVY	KKN
1	Rasisalai United (Q)	6	3	3	0	9	6	+3	12	Advance to knockout stage	—	2–1	1–0	2–2
2	Fleet	6	2	2	2	8	7	+1	8		1–1	—	1–1	2–0
3	Navy	6	1	4	1	8	7	+1	7		1–1	3–1	—	2–2
4	Khon Kaen	6	0	3	3	6	11	−5	3		1–2	0–2	1–1	—

Source: Thai League
Rules for classification: 1) Points; 2) Head-to-head points; 3) Head-to-head goal difference; 4) Head-to-head goal scored; 5) Overall goal difference; 6) Overall goal scored; 7) Fair play points; 8) Play-off without extra time).
(Q) Qualified for the phase indicated

Group C

Pos	Team	Pld	W	D	L	GF	GA	GD	Pts	Qualification	SKA	PTN	SKN	TBU
1	Songkhla (Q)	6	4	1	1	9	8	+1	13	Advance to knockout stage	—	0–4	2–0	1–0
2	Pattani (Q)	6	3	1	2	13	6	+7	10	Advance to knockout stage	1–1	—	1–0	4–0
3	Samut Sakhon City	6	2	0	4	6	9	−3	6 (Note: The head-to-head record is tied; Samut Sakhon City 3 pts (GD 0, GF 2), Thonburi United 3 pts (GD 0, GF 2). Samut Sakhon City is ahead in the overall goals difference.)		1–2	3–2	—	1–2
4	Thonburi United	6	2	0	4	6	11	−5	6		2–3	2–1	0–1	—

Source: Thai League
Rules for classification: 1) Points; 2) Head-to-head points; 3) Head-to-head goal difference; 4) Head-to-head goal scored; 5) Overall goal difference; 6) Overall goal scored; 7) Fair play points; 8) Play-off without extra time).
(Q) Qualified for the phase indicated
Notes:

Ranking of second-placed clubs

Pos	Grp	Team	Pld	W	D	L	GF	GA	GD	Pts	Qualification
1	C	Pattani	6	3	1	2	13	6	+7	10	Advance to knockout stage
2	B	Fleet	6	2	2	2	8	7	+1	8	
3	A	Lopburi City	6	2	1	3	9	12	−3	7	

Source: Thai League
Rules for classification: 1) Points; 2) Goal difference; 3) Goals scored; 4) Away goals scored; 5) Wins; 6) Away wins.

=== Knockout stage ===
Semi-finals
Rasisalai United	5	0	5
Pattani	3	1	4
Songkhla	3	0	3
North Bangkok University	0	2	2

Finals
Rasisalai United	1	4	5
Songkhla	0	1	1
Third place play-offs
North Bangkok University	0	1	1
Pattani	0	2	2

==== Semi-finals ====
Team 1	Agg.	Team 2	1st leg	2nd leg
Rasisalai United	5–4	Pattani	5–3	0–1
Songkhla	3–2	North Bangkok University	3–0	0–2

==== Third place play-offs ====
Team 1	Agg.	Team 2	1st leg	2nd leg
North Bangkok University	1–2	Pattani	0–0	1–2

==== Finals ====
Team 1	Agg.	Team 2	1st leg	2nd leg
Rasisalai United	5–1	Songkhla	1–0	4–1

== See also ==
- 2024–25 Thai League 1
- 2024–25 Thai League 2
- 2024–25 Thai League 3 Northern Region
- 2024–25 Thai League 3 Central Region
- 2024–25 Thai League 3 Northeastern Region
- 2024–25 Thai League 3 Eastern Region
- 2024–25 Thai League 3 Western Region
- 2024–25 Thai League 3 Southern Region
- 2024–25 Thai League 3 National Championship
- 2024–25 Thai League 3 Cup
- 2024–25 Thai FA Cup
- 2024–25 Thai League Cup
- 2024 Thai U23 League
