= 2024–25 Thai League 3 Southern Region =

Thai League 3 Southern Region
- Season: 2024–25
- Dates: 14 September 2024 – 29 March 2025
- Champions: Songkhla
- Relegated: Phatthalung; Yala City
- T3 National Championship: Songkhla; Pattani
- Matches: 132
- Goals: 273 (2.07 per match)
- Top goalscorer: (Brazil) Diogo Pereira (12 goals; Muang Trang United)
- Best goalkeeper: (Thailand) Sorawat Phosaman (15 clean sheets; Songkhla)
- Biggest home win: 4 goals difference Krabi 4–0 Satun (27 October 2024)
- Biggest away win: 4 goals difference Krabi 0–4 Phatthalung (15 February 2025)
- Highest scoring: 7 goals PSU Surat Thani City 3–4 Phuket Andaman (24 November 2024)
- Longest winning run: 4 matches Yala
- Longest unbeaten run: 18 matches Songkhla
- Longest winless run: 10 matches Phuket Andaman; Yala City
- Longest losing run: 6 matches Ranong United
- Highest attendance: 9,590; Pattani 1–0 Nara United (28 February 2025)
- Lowest attendance: 0
- Total attendance: 158,359
- Average attendance: 1,247

The 2024–25 Thai League 3 Southern Region is part of the 2024–25 Thai League 3 Regional Stage, consisting of 12 clubs located in the southern region of Thailand. The season will commence on 14 September 2024, with clubs competing in a round-robin format featuring home-and-away matches. The Regional Stage will conclude on 29 March 2025, at which point the top two clubs will advance to the National Championship Stage, while the bottom-placed club will face relegation to the Thailand Semi-pro League for the following season. This stage reflects the growing enthusiasm for football in Thailand's southern provinces, where clubs from coastal and rural areas proudly represent their regions on a national level.

== Seasonal Changes ==
=== Relegation from Thai League 2 ===
Krabi was relegated from Thai League 2 and will now compete in the Southern Region, carrying experience with it from a higher division.

=== Promotion from Thailand Semi-pro League ===
Yala City was promoted from the Thailand Semi-pro League and will compete in the Southern Region for the 2024–25 season.

=== Club licensing failures ===
MH Nakhon Si City was relegated to the Thailand Semi-pro League after failing to meet licensing standards.

=== Relegation based on performance ===
Trang was relegated to the Thailand Semi-pro League after finishing last in the Southern Region.

=== Club name and logo changes ===
- Pattani updated its logo by changing the cannon from black to gold, adding two hibiscus flowers, and incorporating a floral pattern.
- Wiang Sa Surat Thani City rebranded as PSU Surat Thani City. The club retained its Arowana fish symbol but updated the logo text to reflect the new name.

== Teams ==
=== Number of teams by province ===
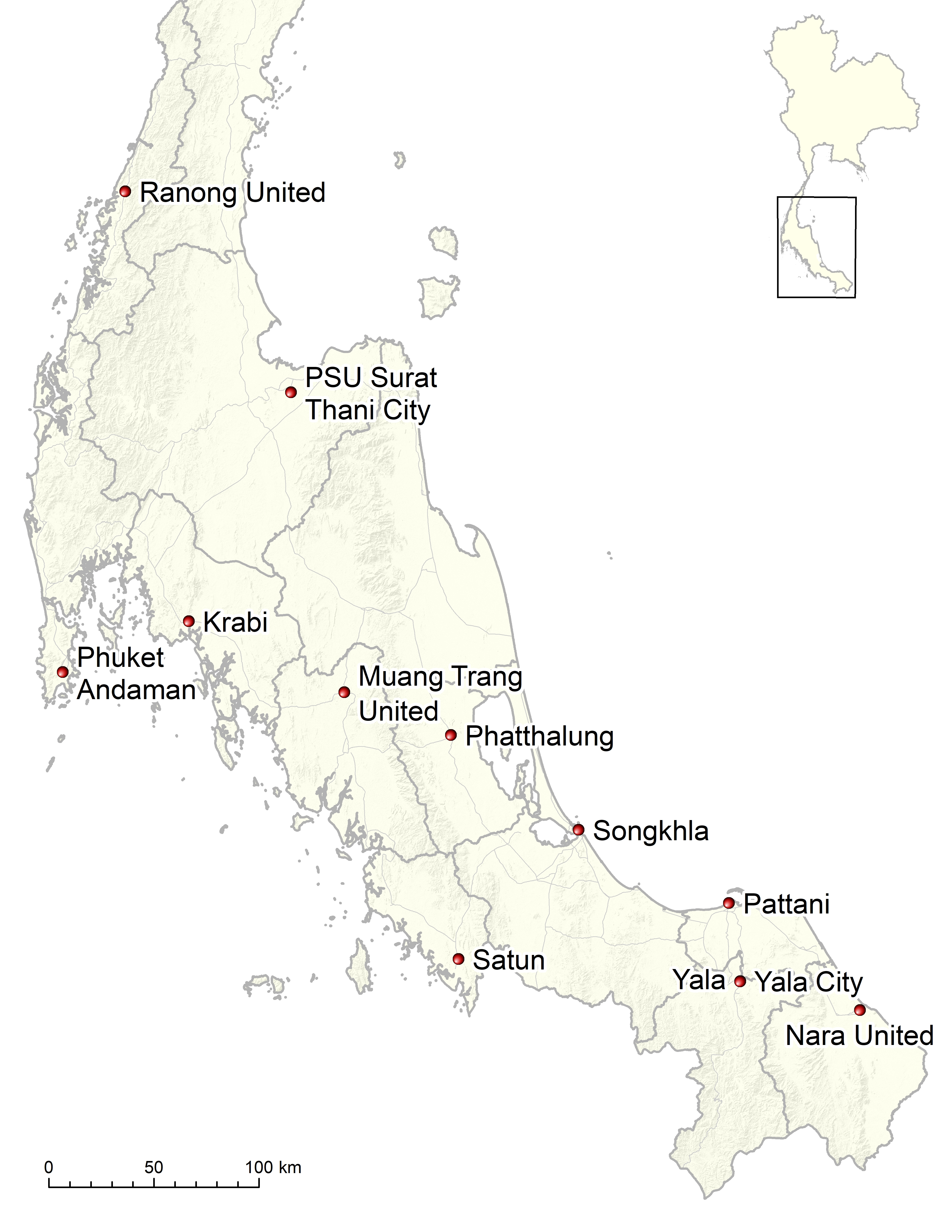
Locations of the 2024–25 Thai League 3 Southern Region clubs.

Position	Province	Number	Teams
1	Yala	2	Yala and Yala City
2	Krabi	1	Krabi
2	Narathiwat	1	Nara United
2	Pattani	1	Pattani
2	Phatthalung	1	Phatthalung
2	Phuket	1	Phuket Andaman
2	Ranong	1	Ranong United
2	Satun	1	Satun
2	Songkhla	1	Songkhla
2	Surat Thani	1	PSU Surat Thani City
2	Trang	1	Muang Trang United

=== Stadiums and locations ===
Team	Location	Stadium	Coordinates
Krabi	Krabi (Mueang)	Krabi Provincial Stadium	8°06′30″N 98°55′00″E
Muang Trang United	Trang (Huai Yot)	Muang Trang Stadium	7°48′08″N 99°35′18″E
Nara United	Narathiwat (Mueang)	Narathiwat PAO. Stadium	6°25′31″N 101°48′23″E
Pattani	Pattani (Mueang)	Rainbow Stadium	6°53′20″N 101°14′41″E
Phatthalung	Phatthalung (Mueang)	Phatthalung PAO. Stadium	7°37′00″N 100°02′55″E
Phuket Andaman	Phuket (Mueang)	Surakul Stadium	7°53′20″N 98°22′19″E
PSU Surat Thani City	Surat Thani (Mueang)	Stadium of Prince of Songkla University, Surat Thani Campus	9°05′39″N 99°21′32″E
Ranong United	Ranong (Mueang)	Ranong Provincial Stadium	9°57′35″N 98°38′25″E
Satun	Satun (Mueang)	Satun PAO. Stadium	6°39′05″N 100°04′44″E
Songkhla	Songkhla (Mueang)	Tinsulanon Stadium	7°12′26″N 100°35′55″E
Yala	Yala (Mueang)	Stadium of Yala Rajabhat University	6°33′03″N 101°17′30″E
Yala City	Yala (Mueang)	Stadium of Thailand National Sports University, Yala Campus	6°33′09″N 101°17′31″E

=== Personnel and sponsoring ===
Note: Flags indicate national team as has been defined under FIFA eligibility rules. Players may hold more than one non-FIFA nationality; Club dissolved during season would shown by grey background.

Team	Manager	Captain	Kit
Krabi	(Thailand) Sarawut Treephan		(Thailand) Double Soccer
Muang Trang United	(Scotland) Richard Horlock	(Thailand) Akarat Punkaew	(Thailand) Made by club
Nara United	(Thailand) Santisuk Chaisol	(Thailand) Somnuek Kaewarporn	(Thailand) Runnaraa
Pattani	(Thailand) Pattarapol Naprasert	(Brazil) Marlon Silva	(Thailand) Maisz Sport
Phatthalung		(Thailand) Eakaphong Thorchum	(Thailand) Made by club
Phuket Andaman	(Thailand) Jarupong Sangpong	(Thailand) Patapee Tiamtun	(Thailand) OIN Sport
PSU Surat Thani City		(Thailand) Sarawut Chitthai	(Thailand) Pass Sports
Ranong United			(Thailand) Offside Design
Satun	(Thailand) Tawatchai Thonghuad	(Thailand) Chaiya Nakkaree	(Thailand) Imane
Songkhla	(Japan) Daiki Higuchi	(Thailand) Abdulhafis Nibu	(Thailand) EightyEight Sport
Yala		(Thailand) Adam Lassamano	(Thailand) UM Sport
Yala City			(Thailand) SH Sport

=== Foreign players ===
A T3 team could register 3 foreign players from foreign players all around the world. A team can use 3 foreign players on the field in each game.

Note :
(substituted off) : players who released during second leg transfer window;
(substituted on) : players who registered during second leg transfer window.

AFC member countries players.
CAF member countries players.
CONCACAF member countries players.
CONMEBOL member countries players.
OFC member countries players.
UEFA member countries players.
No foreign player registered.

Club	Leg	Player 1	Player 2	Player 3
Krabi	1st	(Russia) Alim Zumakulov (substituted off)	(Egypt) Abdelrahman Khaled Elsayed Seddik	(Iraq) Ezzulddin A.Alrazzaq A. Al-Bassam
Krabi	2nd	(Cameroon) Ngang Anlaa Elysee (substituted on)	(Egypt) Abdelrahman Khaled Elsayed Seddik	(Iraq) Ezzulddin A.Alrazzaq A. Al-Bassam
Muang Trang United	1st	(Brazil) William Henrique (substituted off)	(Germany) Flodyn Ruchelvy Ulrich Baloki (substituted off)	(Brazil) Diogo Pereira
Muang Trang United	2nd	(Brazil) Romário Reginaldo Alves (substituted on)	(Brazil) Felipe Micael (substituted on)	(Brazil) Diogo Pereira
Nara United	1st	(Brazil) Caio da Conceição Silva	(Argentina) Juan Francisco Odorisio	(Japan) Ryohei Maeda
Nara United	2nd	(Brazil) Caio da Conceição Silva	(Argentina) Juan Francisco Odorisio	(Japan) Ryohei Maeda
Pattani	1st	(Brazil) Romário Reginaldo Alves (substituted off)	(Brazil) Marlon Henrique Brandão da Silva	(Brazil) Felipe Nunes
Pattani	2nd	(South Korea) Kim Jin-hyeong (substituted on)	(Brazil) Marlon Henrique Brandão da Silva	(Brazil) Felipe Nunes
Phatthalung	1st	(Brazil) Caio Silva Sena dos Santos (substituted off)	(Brazil) Erivelto (substituted off)	(Brazil) Lucas Gaudencio Moraes
Phatthalung	2nd	(France) Adel Gafaiti (substituted on)	(Argentina) Pablo Matías Stupiski (substituted on)	(Brazil) Lucas Gaudencio Moraes
Phuket Andaman	1st	(Egypt) Abdelrahman Osama Mohamed (substituted off)	(Ivory Coast) Coulibaly Chomana (substituted off)
Phuket Andaman	2nd	(Netherlands) Kai Davy Boham (substituted on)	(Sweden) David Emannuel Danielsson (substituted on)	(United States) Luke Pavone (substituted on)
PSU Surat Thani City	1st	(Myanmar) Phyo Min Latt (substituted off)	(Brazil) Josimar Tiago da Silva	(Mali) Toloba Aremu Kassim Mouyidine
PSU Surat Thani City	2nd	(South Korea) Kwon Hyuk (substituted on)	(Brazil) Josimar Tiago da Silva	(Mali) Toloba Aremu Kassim Mouyidine
Ranong United	1st	(Brazil) Guilherme Araújo de Carvalho (substituted off)	(France) Franck Kouentchi (substituted off)	(Brazil) Kaio Margues da Silva
Ranong United	2nd	(Brazil) John Caio Camargo Silva (substituted on)	(Egypt) Abdelrahman Osama Mohamed (substituted on)	(Brazil) Kaio Margues da Silva
Satun	1st	(Brazil) Wellerson da Silva Machado Guimarães (substituted off)	(Republic of the Congo) Burnel Okana-Stazi (substituted off)	(Brazil) Victor Clemente de Oliveira Capinan
Satun	2nd	(Brazil) Mairon Natan Pereira Maciel Oliveira (substituted on)	(Laos) Mitsada Saitaifah (substituted on)	(Brazil) Victor Clemente de Oliveira Capinan
Songkhla	1st	(Argentina) Pablo Matías Stupiski (substituted off)	(Brazil) Emerson Felipe Alves Peixoto de Almeida	(Argentina) Ramiro Lizaso
Songkhla	2nd	(Brazil) Jhonatan Bernardo (substituted on)	(Brazil) Emerson Felipe Alves Peixoto de Almeida	(Argentina) Ramiro Lizaso
Yala	1st	(Brazil) John Caio Camargo Silva (substituted off)	(Ghana) George Senior Atta	(South Korea) Jung Hyeon-gu
Yala	2nd	(Brazil) Célio Guilherme da Silva Santos (substituted on)	(Ghana) George Senior Atta	(South Korea) Jung Hyeon-gu
Yala City	1st
Yala City	2nd	(Egypt) Mazen Reda Abdelefattah Mohamed (substituted on)	(Egypt) Ibrahim Hatem Ibrahim Elsayed (substituted on)

== League table ==
=== Standings ===
Pos	Team	Pld	W	D	L	GF	GA	GD	Pts	Qualification or relegation
1	Songkhla (C, Q)	22	12	8	2	24	9	+15	44	Qualification to the National Championship stage
2	Pattani (Q)	22	11	6	5	26	18	+8	39	Qualification to the National Championship stage
3	Yala	22	9	8	5	19	15	+4	35	
4	Nara United	22	8	10	4	24	19	+5	34	
5	Satun	22	8	9	5	19	18	+1	33	
6	Muang Trang United	22	8	8	6	34	28	+6	32	
7	Phatthalung (R)	22	7	9	6	23	18	+5	30	Relegation to the Thailand Semi-pro League (Note: Phatthalung was administratively relegated to the 2026 Thailand Semi-pro League for failing to meet club licensing standards.)
8	PSU Surat Thani City	22	7	8	7	30	26	+4	29	
9	Krabi	22	6	4	12	25	32	−7	22	
10	Ranong United	22	6	3	13	18	29	−11	21	
11	Phuket Andaman	22	4	5	13	18	35	−17	17	
12	Yala City (R)	22	2	10	10	13	26	−13	16	Relegation to the Thailand Semi-pro League

Source: Thai League
Rules for classification: 1) Points; 2) Head-to-head points; 3) Head-to-head goal difference; 4) Head-to-head goal scored; 5) Overall goal difference; 6) Overall goal scored; 7) Fair play points; 8) Play-off without extra time).
(C) Champions; (Q) Qualified for the phase indicated; (R) Relegated

=== Positions by round ===
Team ╲ Round	1	2	3	4	5	6	7	8	9	10	11	12	13	14	15	16	17	18	19	20	21	22
Songkhla	4	1	3	4	2	2	1	1	1	1	1	1	1	1	1	1	1	1	1	1	1	1
Pattani	2	6	6	3	6	4	2	3	2	2	4	5	5	5	4	3	4	3	2	2	2	2
Yala	1	4	1	1	1	3	4	5	4	5	3	3	2	2	2	2	2	2	3	3	3	3
Nara United	6	2	4	6	4	1	3	2	3	4	5	4	3	3	3	4	3	4	4	4	4	4
Satun	8	3	2	2	5	7	7	7	8	7	6	6	6	6	6	7	7	6	6	6	6	5
Muang Trang United	5	5	5	7	3	5	5	4	6	6	7	7	8	8	7	6	6	7	7	7	5	6
Phatthalung	3	8	8	5	7	6	6	6	5	3	2	2	4	4	5	5	5	5	5	5	7	7
PSU Surat Thani City	11	10	9	9	10	8	9	8	7	8	8	8	7	7	8	8	8	8	8	8	8	8
Krabi	10	9	12	10	12	12	11	12	10	9	9	9	9	9	9	9	10	9	9	9	10	9
Ranong United	7	7	7	8	8	9	10	11	12	10	11	10	11	11	11	11	11	10	10	10	9	10
Phuket Andaman	9	11	10	12	9	10	8	9	9	11	10	11	10	10	10	10	9	11	12	12	12	11
Yala City	12	12	11	11	11	11	12	10	11	12	12	12	12	12	12	12	12	12	11	11	11	12

Source: Thai League
= Qualification to the National Championship stage; = Relegation to the Thailand Semi-pro League

=== Results by round ===
Team ╲ Round	1	2	3	4	5	6	7	8	9	10	11	12	13	14	15	16	17	18	19	20	21	22
Songkhla	W	W	D	D	W	D	W	W	W	D	W	W	D	W	W	D	W	W	L	D	D	L
Pattani	W	D	D	W	L	W	W	L	W	L	D	D	D	W	W	W	L	W	W	D	W	L
Yala	W	D	W	W	D	L	D	D	W	D	W	D	W	W	W	W	L	D	L	D	L	L
Nara United	D	W	D	D	W	W	D	W	L	D	L	W	W	D	W	D	W	L	D	L	D	D
Satun	D	W	W	D	D	L	L	D	L	W	D	W	D	D	L	L	W	W	W	D	D	W
Muang Trang United	D	W	D	D	W	D	L	W	L	L	L	D	D	L	W	W	W	L	W	D	W	D
Phatthalung	W	L	L	W	L	W	D	D	W	W	W	D	D	D	L	W	L	D	D	D	L	D
PSU Surat Thani City	L	L	D	D	D	W	D	D	W	D	L	L	W	D	D	L	W	L	L	W	W	W
Krabi	L	L	L	D	L	L	W	L	W	W	D	L	L	D	L	L	L	W	D	W	L	W
Ranong United	D	W	D	L	L	L	L	L	L	W	L	W	L	L	L	D	L	W	L	W	W	L
Phuket Andaman	L	L	D	L	W	D	W	L	L	L	W	L	L	D	L	L	D	L	D	L	L	W
Yala City	L	L	D	L	D	D	L	W	L	L	D	L	D	L	D	D	D	L	W	L	D	D

Source: Thai League
W = Won; D = Drawn; L = Lost

=== Results ===
Home \ Away	KBI	MTG	NRA	PTN	PLG	PKA	STC	RNU	STN	SKA	YLA	YLC
Krabi	—	2–1	0–1	1–1	0–4	2–0	2–2	1–2	4–0	2–1	0–2	3–1
Muang Trang United	4–2	—	0–0	3–1	2–2	1–1	2–0	4–2	0–1	0–0	3–2	1–1
Nara United	3–2	1–1	—	2–1	0–0	2–1	1–1	1–0	2–2	1–3	2–0	2–0
Pattani	1–0	3–2	1–0	—	1–2	2–1	1–0	1–0	1–0	0–0	0–0	2–0
Phatthalung	1–0	1–2	1–0	0–0	—	4–1	0–1	1–0	2–2	0–1	1–1	1–1
Phuket Andaman	0–0	1–3	1–1	2–1	1–1	—	1–4	1–2	0–1	0–2	1–2	1–0
PSU Surat Thani City	2–2	2–0	2–1	3–2	0–0	3–4	—	4–1	0–1	1–2	0–1	1–1
Ranong United	1–0	1–3	0–0	1–3	2–0	1–0	0–0	—	0–0	1–2	0–1	4–1
Satun	2–0	1–1	1–1	0–2	1–0	2–0	1–1	1–0	—	0–1	0–0	1–1
Songkhla	1–0	2–0	1–1	0–0	1–0	1–0	1–0	3–0	1–2	—	0–0	1–1
Yala	2–1	1–0	0–0	1–1	1–1	0–1	1–2	1–0	1–0	0–0	—	1–0
Yala City	0–1	1–1	1–2	0–1	0–1	0–0	1–1	1–0	0–0	0–0	2–1	—

Source: Thai League
Legend: Blue = home team win; Yellow = draw; Red = away team win.
For upcoming matches, an "a" indicates there is an article about the rivalry between the two participants.

== Season statistics ==
=== Top scorers ===
As of 29 March 2025.

Rank	Player	Club	Goals
1	(Brazil) Diogo Pereira	Muang Trang United	12
2	(Brazil) Caio da Conceição Silva	Nara United	11
3	(Thailand) Sarod Jitsanoh	Phuket Andaman	9
4	(Thailand) Somprat Ruangnoon	Muang Trang United	8
5	(Brazil) Romário Alves	Pattani (4 Goals); Muang Trang United (3 Goals)	7
5	(Thailand) Kritsada Jarujreet	PSU Surat Thani City	7
5	(Brazil) Josimar Tiago da Silva	PSU Surat Thani City	7

=== Hat-tricks ===
Player	For	Against	Result	Date
(Brazil) Josimar Tiago da Silva	PSU Surat Thani City	Pattani	3–2 (H)	29 March 2025

Notes: ^{4} = Player scored 4 goals; (H) = Home team; (A) = Away team

=== Clean sheets ===
As of 29 March 2025.

Rank	Player	Club	Clean sheets
1	(Thailand) Sorawat Phosaman	Songkhla	15
2	(Thailand) Ittikorn Kansrang	Pattani	12
3	(Thailand) Amran Bungosayu	Yala	11
4	(Thailand) Wuttichai Panboot	Satun	9
5	(Thailand) Jarudet Ramudth	Nara United	8

== Attendances ==
=== Overall statistical table ===
Pos	Team	Total	High	Low	Average	Change
1	Pattani	37,927	9,590	1,355	3,448	+6.2%
2	Nara United	31,694	5,299	0	3,169	+253.7%
3	Satun	21,664	3,408	800	1,969	−21.2%
4	Yala	15,121	2,200	726	1,375	+31.8%
5	Phatthalung	13,255	3,356	0	1,326	+30.8%
6	Muang Trang United	10,461	1,200	500	951	+37.6%
7	Yala City	9,147	2,125	356	832	+8.8%^{↑}
8	Songkhla	5,790	1,836	189	526	−12.3%
9	PSU Surat Thani City	4,709	800	225	428	+13.8%
10	Ranong United	2,850	750	0	356	+39.1%
11	Phuket Andaman	3,417	900	88	311	+31.2%
12	Krabi	2,324	400	85	211	−26.7%^{↓}
	League total	158,359	9,590	0	1,247	+23.8%

Updated to games played on 29 March 2025
Source: Thai League

=== Attendances by home match played ===
Team \ Match played	1	2	3	4	5	6	7	8	9	10	11	Total
Krabi	253	221	400	300	150	250	85	150	200	150	165	2,324
Muang Trang United	1,200	1,120	1,200	975	1,120	895	500	500	1,190	786	975	10,461
Nara United	2,000	2,000	2,000	3,000	2,500	3,000	4,800	3,800	5,299	3,295	Unk.5	31,694
Pattani	2,950	3,200	2,750	2,322	3,714	3,133	3,613	1,355	9,590	2,200	3,100	37,927
Phatthalung	950	654	1,296	1,631	1,724	1,149	1,159	Unk.3	836	3,356	500	13,255
Phuket Andaman	300	900	198	231	88	400	200	300	300	200	300	3,417
PSU Surat Thani City	285	579	800	630	340	295	294	225	298	420	543	4,709
Ranong United	Unk.1	750	300	300	150	300	Unk.2	400	350	Unk.4	300	2,850
Satun	1,573	1,959	3,408	2,301	800	2,317	3,130	2,138	1,066	1,210	1,762	21,664
Songkhla	374	1,836	672	629	325	423	189	250	245	287	560	5,790
Yala	2,200	1,647	1,158	2,167	2,167	1,140	829	1,358	726	1,000	729	15,121
Yala City	600	532	356	502	458	1,520	2,125	520	850	1,228	456	9,147

Note:
Unk.1 Some error of T3 official match report 14 September 2024 (Ranong United 0–0 Satun).
Unk.2 Some error of T3 official match report 2 February 2025 (Ranong United 0–1 Yala).
Unk.3 Some error of T3 official match report 8 February 2025 (Phatthalung 0–1 Songkhla).
Unk.4 Some error of T3 official match report 15 March 2025 (Ranong United 1–0 Phuket Andaman).
Unk.5 Some error of T3 official match report 29 March 2025 (Nara United 1–1 Muang Trang United).
