= Boonkerd Chaiyasin =

Thai footballer

Personal information
- Full name: Boonkerd Chaiyasin
- Date of birth: 9 January 1996 (age 30)
- Place of birth: Samut Prakan, Thailand
- Height: 1.71 m (5 ft 7 1/2 in)
- Position: Striker

Team information
- Current team: Northern Nakhon Mae Sot United
- Number: 70

Youth career
- 2011–2013: Assumption College Sri Racha

Senior career*
Years	Team	Apps	(Gls)
2014–2018	Chonburi	1	(0)
2014	→ Sriracha (loan)	32	(6)
2015	→ Phan Thong (loan)	16	(2)
2016	→ Pattaya United (loan)	0	(0)
2017	→ Lampang (loan)	7	(0)
2017	→ Krabi (loan)	8	(0)
2019	Lamphun Warrior	20	(0)
2020	Phitsanulok	1	(0)
2021–2022	Maejo United	12	(3)
2023–2025	Khelang United	36	(7)
2025–	Northern Nakhon Mae Sot United	18	(2)

International career^{‡}
2014	Thailand U19	4	(0)
- * Club domestic league appearances and goals ‡ National team caps and goals as of 4 February 2024

Boonkerd Chaiyasin (Thai: บุญเกิด ไชยสิน, born January 9, 1996), simply known as Tep (Thai: เทพ), is a Thai professional footballer who plays as a striker for Thai League 3 club Northern Nakhon Mae Sot United.
