= Liu Chaoyang =

Chinese association football player

Personal information
- Date of birth: 9 June 1999 (age 27)
- Place of birth: Chengdu, Sichuan, China
- Height: 1.82 m (6 ft 0 in)
- Position: Midfielder

Senior career*
Years	Team	Apps	(Gls)
2019–2023	Shandong Taishan	6	(0)
2019	→ Sichuan Longfor (loan)	11	(1)
2020	→ Shijiazhuang Ever Bright (loan)	1	(0)
2021	→ Chengdu Rongcheng (loan)	11	(1)
2022	→ Shaanxi Chang'an Athletic (loan)	26	(7)
2023–2024	Qingdao Hainiu	5	(0)
2024	→ Guangdong GZ-Power (loan)	9	(0)
2024–2025	Chiangmai	3	(1)
2025–2026	Khelang United	2	(0)

International career
2017–2018	China U19	5	(0)
- * Club domestic league appearances and goals as of 27 September 2025 (UTC)

Liu Chaoyang (simplified Chinese: 刘超阳; traditional Chinese: 劉超陽; pinyin: Liú Chāoyáng; born 9 June 1999) or Louis Liu is a Chinese former football player who played as a midfielder.

== Club career ==
Liu Chaoyang was promoted to the senior team of Shandong Luneng within the 2019 Chinese Super League season and would make his debut on 1 March 2019 in a league game against Beijing Renhe F.C. that ended in a 1–0 victory. To gain more playing time he was loaned out to second tier club Sichuan Longfor for the remainder of the season. After playing several further games for Shandong the following season, Liu was loaned out again, this time to top tier club Shijiazhuang Ever Bright. The 2021 league campaign saw Liu loaned out for the entire season to second tier club Chengdu Rongcheng where he was able to gain significantly more playing time within the team as he aided them to promotion to the top tier at the end of the season.

== Career statistics ==
As of 8 August 2025.

Club	Season	League			Cup		Continental		Other		Total	
Club	Season	Division	Apps	Goals	Apps	Goals	Apps	Goals	Apps	Goals	Apps	Goals
Shandong Luneng	2019	Chinese Super League	1	0	1	0	0	0	–		2	0
Shandong Luneng	2020	Chinese Super League	5	0	1	0	0	0	–		6	0
Shandong Luneng	Total		6	0	2	0	0	0	0	0	8	0
Sichuan Longfor (loan)	2019	China League One	9	1	0	0	–		2 (Note: Appearance(s) in China League One relegation play-offs)	0	11	1
Shijiazhuang Ever Bright (loan)	2020	Chinese Super League	1	0	0	0	–		–		1	0
Chengdu Rongcheng (loan)	2021	China League One	11	1	1	0	–		0 (Note: Appearance(s) in CSL Relegation play-offs)	0	12	1
Shaanxi Chang'an Athletic (loan)	2022	China League One	0	0	0	0	–		–		0	0
Qingdao Hainiu	2023	Chinese Super League	5	0	0	0	–		–		5	0
Qingdao Hainiu	2024	Chinese Super League	0	0	0	0	–		–		0	0
Guangdong GZ-Power (loan)	2024	Chinese League Two	9	0	0	0	–		–		9	0
Chiangmai	2024–25	Thai League 3	3	1	0	0	–		–		3	1
Khelang United	2025–26	Thai League 3	0	0	0	0	–		–		0	0
Career total			44	3	3	0	0	0	2	0	49	3
