= Kantapol Sompittayanurak =

Thai footballer (born 1989)

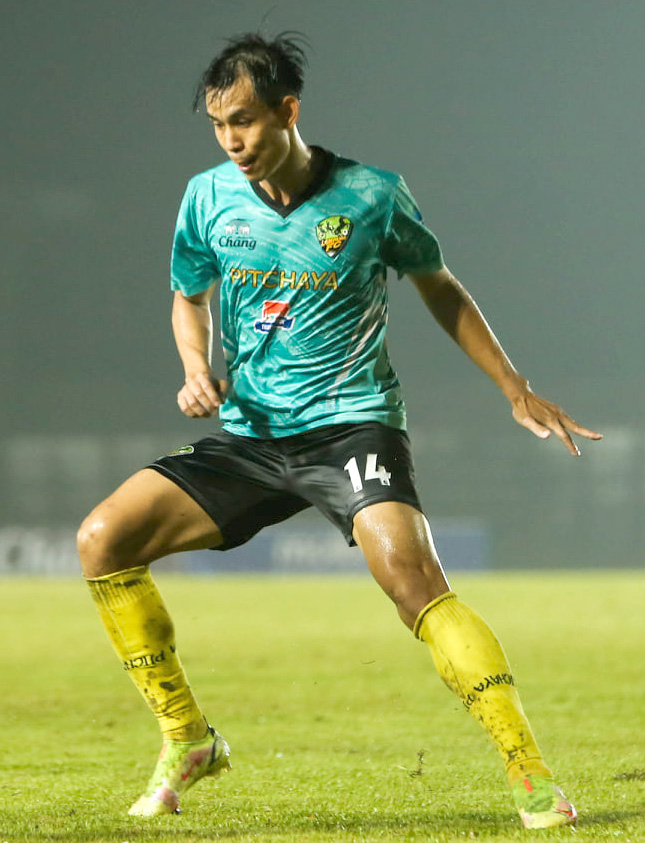

Personal information
- Full name: Kantapol Sompittayanurak
- Date of birth: 1 November 1989 (age 37)
- Place of birth: Samut Prakan, Thailand
- Height: 1.84 m (6 ft 1/2 in)
- Positions: Centre-back; left-back

Team information
- Current team: Khelang United
- Number: 4

Senior career*
Years	Team	Apps	(Gls)
2008	Bangkok Bank	11	(0)
2009–2010	Samut Songkhram	26	(2)
2011–2012	Chanthaburi	16	(0)
2013–2014	Samut Songkhram	34	(0)
2015	Port	2	(0)
2015	TTM Customs	8	(0)
2016–2019	Nakhon Ratchasima	21	(0)
2020	Nongbua Pitchaya	2	(0)
2020–2021	Udon United	18	(0)
2021–2022	Lampang	38	(0)
2023	Chiangmai United	2	(0)
2023	Lampang	3	(0)
2023–2024	Khelang United	7	(0)
2024	North Bangkok University	3	(0)
2025–	Khelang United	10	(1)
- * Club domestic league appearances and goals as of 24 February 2025

Kantapol Sompittayanurak (Thai: กันตภณ สมพิทยานุรักษ์) (born 1 November 1989) is a Thai professional footballer who plays for Thai club Khelang United as a defender.

== Honour ==
Nongbua Pitchaya

- Thai League 2 Champions : 2020–21
