= Pathomtat Sudprasert =

Thai footballer

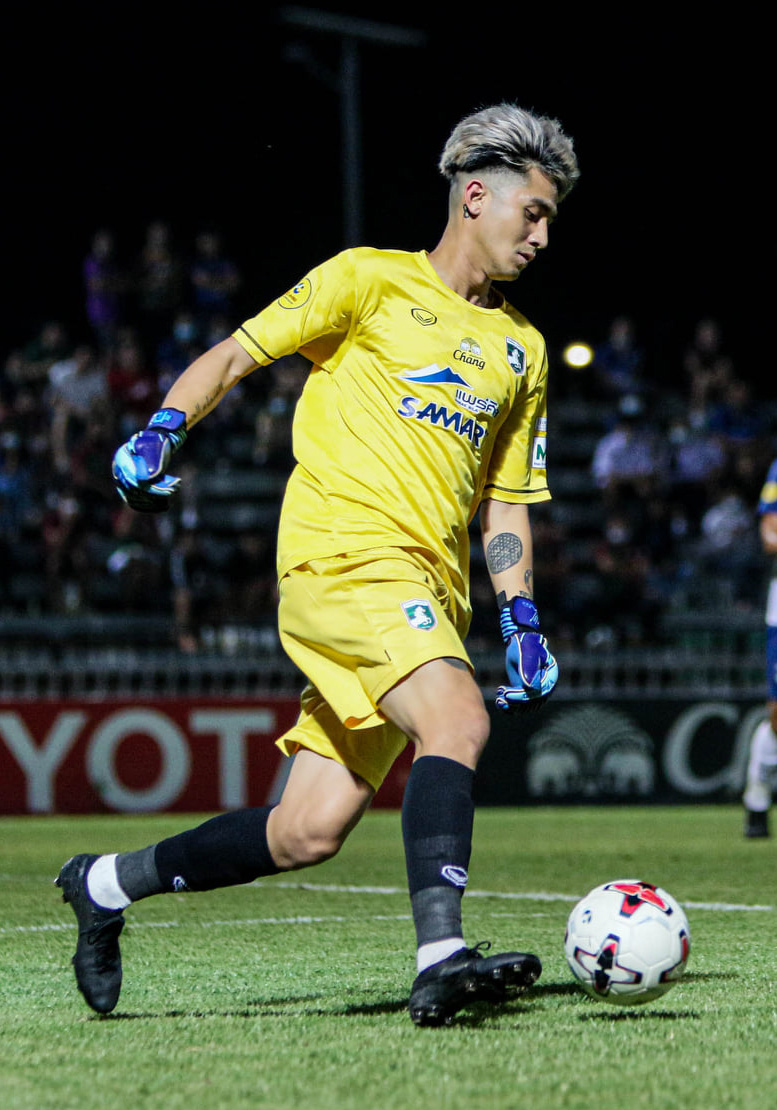
- Pathomtat Sudprasert playing for Phrae United FC.

Personal information
- Full name: Pathomtat Sudprasert
- Date of birth: August 8, 1993 (age 33)
- Place of birth: Bangkok, Thailand
- Height: 1.80 m (5 ft 11 in)
- Position: Goalkeeper

Team information
- Current team: Maejo United
- Number: 23

Youth career
- 2010–2011: Bangkok Glass

Senior career*
Years	Team	Apps	(Gls)
2012–2016	Super Power Samut Prakan	5	(0)
2013	→ Rayong United (loan)	15	(0)
2014	→ Roi Et (loan)	30	(0)
2017–2018	Suphanburi	0	(0)
2019	North Bangkok University	13	(0)
2019	Chiangmai	0	(0)
2020–2021	Phrae United	45	(0)
2022	Rajpracha	8	(0)
2023	Chainat Hornbill	15	(0)
2023–2024	Chiangmai United	3	(0)
2024–	Maejo United	9	(0)
- * Club domestic league appearances and goals as of 17 December 2023

Pathomtat Sudprasert (Thai: ปฐมทัตน์ สุดประเสริฐ, born 8 August 1993), or simply known as Junior (Thai: จูเนียร์), is a Thai professional footballer who plays as a goalkeeper for Thai League 3 club Maejo United.
