= Yala City F.C. =

Yala City ยะลา ซิตี้
- Full name: Yala City Football Club
- Nicknames: The potentate of killer roosters (พญาไก่พิฆาต)
- Founded: 2023; 3 years ago
- Ground: Stadium of Thailand National Sports University, Yala Campus; Yala, Thailand
- Capacity: 3,000
- Coordinates: 6°33′09″N 101°17′31″E
- Owner(s): Yala City 2023 Co., Ltd.
- Chairman: Ilham Doloh
- Head coach: Nurdin Asabango
- League: Thai League 3
- 2024–25: Thai League 3, 12th of 12 in the Southern region (relegated)
- Website: https://www.facebook.com/p/Yala-City-Football-Club-100088724067133/

Yala City Football Club (Thai สโมสรฟุตบอล ยะลา ซิตี้), is a Thai football club based in Mueang, Yala, Thailand. The club is currently playing in the Thai League 3 Southern region.

== History ==
In 2023, the club was established.

In early 2024, the club competed in Thailand Semi-pro League Southern region finished in 1st place of the region, promoted to the Thai League 3.

== Stadium and locations ==
Coordinates	Location	Stadium	Year
6°33′09″N 101°17′31″E	Mueang, Yala	Stadium of Thailand National Sports University, Yala Campus	2024 – present

== Season by season record ==
Season	League									FA Cup	League Cup	T3 Cup	Top goalscorer	
Season	Division	P	W	D	L	F	A	Pts	Pos	FA Cup	League Cup	T3 Cup	Name	Goals
2024	TS South	4	3	0	1	6	1	9	1st	Opted out	Ineligible		(Thailand) Adilif Chesor	3
2024–25	T3 South	22	2	10	10	13	26	16	12th	Opted out	QR1	Opted out	(Thailand) Ridwan Kehra, (Thailand) Nusrool Tool Aman, (Thailand) Suhaimee Salaeh	2
2026–27	T3 South										QR1			

Champions	Runners-up	Promoted	Relegated

- P = Played
- W = Games won
- D = Games drawn
- L = Games lost
- F = Goals for
- A = Goals against
- Pts = Points
- Pos = Final position
- QR1 = First Qualifying Round
- QR2 = Second Qualifying Round
- R1 = Round 1
- R2 = Round 2
- R3 = Round 3
- R4 = Round 4
- R5 = Round 5
- R6 = Round 6
- QF = Quarter-finals
- SF = Semi-finals
- RU = Runners-up
- W = Winners

== Players ==
=== Current squad ===
As of 26 September 2024

Note: Flags indicate national team as defined under FIFA eligibility rules; some limited exceptions apply. Players may hold more than one non-FIFA nationality.

No.	Pos.	Nation	Player
5	DF	THA	Muhammat Sidik Uma
6	DF	THA	Afis Waeyama
7	DF	THA	Somchai Longmina
10	FW	THA	Mahaday Jarong
11	FW	THA	Mahamasufiya Sani
13	FW	THA	Sukree Etae
16	MF	THA	Nasrun Sareeyayo
17	DF	THA	Muhammad Salfadee Jehteh
19	MF	THA	Marapee Wani
20	GK	THA	Bukhoree Layee
21	DF	THA	Mahamaharmin Jehheng
22	GK	THA	Ardenan Bindoloh
27	MF	THA	Adul Isma-ae

No.	Pos.	Nation	Player
28	MF	THA	Ridwan Kehra
29	MF	THA	Airfan Cheali
31	DF	THA	Isren Luebaesa
34	DF	THA	Suhaimee Roman
37	MF	THA	Adilif Chesor
47	FW	THA	Suhaimee Salaeh
56	MF	THA	Poramet Saiwari
66	DF	THA	Muhammadameen Malee
88	FW	THA	Hakim Yusoh
89	MF	THA	Burhanuddeen Lomae
96	DF	THA	Chanatip Krainara
99	GK	THA	Safee-e Hengbaroo

== Club management ==
Position	Name
Chairman	(Thailand) Ilham Doloh
Team Manager	(Thailand) Ibrahim Kasirak
Head Coach	(Thailand) Nurdin Asabango
Assistant Coach	(Thailand) Muklis Tahaetae (Thailand) Lukman Hajiyuso (Thailand) Anuwa Senung
Goalkeeper Coach	(Thailand) Asman Yelima
Sports Scientist	(Thailand) Chakrit Tokapo
Team Staff	(Thailand) Alif Harati (Thailand) Arham Karumo
