= Douglas Mineiro =

Brazilian footballer (born 1993)

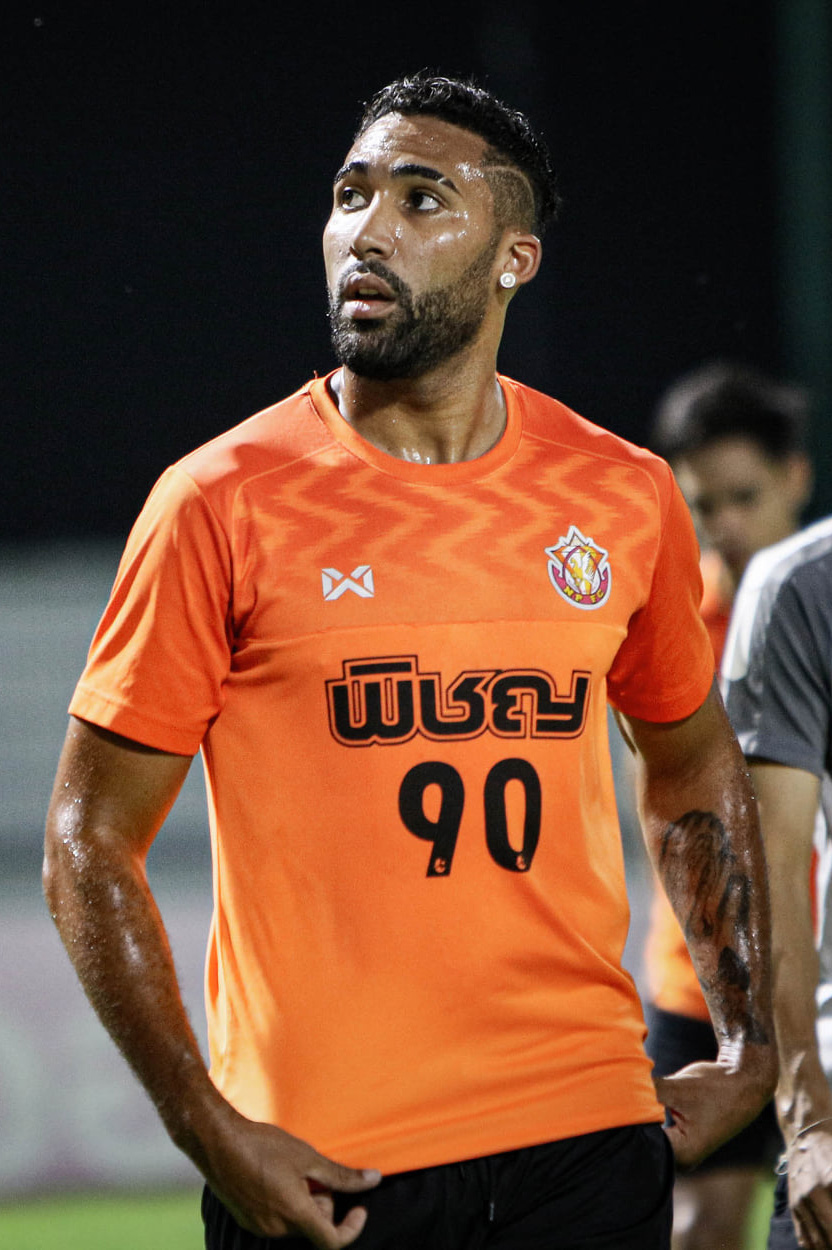

Personal information
- Full name: Douglas Starnley Ferreira
- Date of birth: 11 February 1993 (age 33)
- Place of birth: Nova Era, Brazil
- Height: 1.88 m (6 ft 2 in)
- Position: Forward

Team information
- Current team: Maejo United
- Number: 93

Youth career
- Grêmio Porto Alegre

Senior career*
| Years | Team | Apps | (Gls) |
| –2014 | Baraúnas | | |
| 2014–2015 | CA Atenas | 13 | (1) |
| 2015–2016 | Brasil de Farroupilha | | |
| 2016–2017 | Pelotas | 0 | (0) |
| 2017–2018 | Zimbru Chișinău | 10 | (4) |
| 2018–2019 | Helsingør | 44 | (8) |
| 2020 | Lampang | 14 | (5) |
| 2020–2021 | Nongbua Pitchaya | 15 | (3) |
| 2021 | Rajpracha | 15 | (2) |
| 2022 | Customs Ladkrabang United | 16 | (3) |
| 2023 | Khanh Hoa | 2 | (1) |
| 2023–2024 | Satun | 19 | (7) |
| 2024– | Maejo United | 0 | (0) |
- * Club domestic league appearances and goals as of 10 March 2024 (UTC)

Douglas Starnley Ferreira (born 11 February 1993), commonly known as Douglas Mineiro, is a Brazilian footballer who currently plays as a forward for Thai League 3 club Maejo United.

== Career statistics ==
=== Club ===
As of 28 March 2019.

| Club | Season | League | | | Cup | | Other | | Total | |
| Club | Season | Division | Apps | Goals | Apps | Goals | Apps | Goals | Apps | Goals |
|---|---|---|---|---|---|---|---|---|---|---|
| CA Atenas | 2014–2015 | Uruguayan Primera División | 13 | 1 | 0 | 0 | – | | 13 | 1 |
| Pelotas | 2017 | – | | | 0 | 0 | 14 (Note: Appearances in the Campeonato Gaúcho Série A2) | 2 | 14 | 2 |
| Zimbru Chișinău | 2017 | Moldovan National Division | 10 | 4 | 0 | 0 | – | | 10 | 4 |
| Helsingør | 2017–18 | Danish Superliga | 10 | 0 | 0 | 0 | 3 (Note: Appearances in the Danish 1st Division play/offs) | 3 | 13 | 3 |
| Helsingør | 2018–19 | Danish 1st Division | 19 | 2 | 0 | 0 | – | | 19 | 2 |
| Helsingør | Total | | 29 | 2 | 0 | 0 | 3 | 3 | 32 | 5 |
| Career total | | | 52 | 5 | 0 | 0 | 17 | 5 | 69 | 10 |

== Honour ==
Nongbua Pitchaya

- Thai League 2 Champions : 2020–21

Maejo United

- Thai League 3 Northern Region Champions : 2024–25
