= Sukree Etae =

Thai footballer

Personal information
- Full name: Sukree Etae
- Date of birth: 22 January 1986 (age 40)
- Place of birth: Narathiwat, Thailand
- Height: 1.64 m (5 ft 4 1/2 in)
- Position: Striker

Team information
- Current team: Songkhla
- Number: 13

Youth career
- 2003–2005: Narathiwat

Senior career*
Years	Team	Apps	(Gls)
2006–2009	Narathiwat	58	(9)
2010–2016	Chonburi	19	(6)
2013	→ Phuket (loan)	8	(0)
2014	→ Bangkok (loan)	13	(1)
2015	→ Nara United (loan)	19	(4)
2015	→ Chainat Hornbill (loan)	5	(0)
2016	Phuket	16	(9)
2017	Ayutthaya United	13	(2)
2018	Phuket City		
2019	Nara United		
2019	Lamphun Warrior	4	(0)
2020–2023	Nara United	48	(12)
2024	Yala City	11	(0)
2025–	Songkhla	8	(0)
- * Club domestic league appearances and goals as of 19 March 2025

Sukree Etae (Thai: สุกรี อีแต, RTGS: Sukri Itae, born 22 January 1986) is a Thai professional footballer who plays as a striker.
