= Daiki Higuchi =

Japanese footballer

Personal information
- Date of birth: 8 April 1984 (age 42)
- Place of birth: Yatsushiro, Kumamoto, Japan
- Height: 1.76 m (5 ft 9 in)
- Position: Left-back

Team information
- Current team: Police Tero (head coach)

Youth career
- Fukuoka University

Senior career*
Years	Team	Apps	(Gls)
2007–2008	Gainare Tottori		
2008–2010	Sagawa Printing		
2011	Chonburi	16	(2)
2012–2015	Wuachon United	28	(0)
2016	Thai Honda		
2017–2018	Chamchuri United		

Managerial career
- 2021: Songkhla
- 2022–2023: Phrae United (assistant)
- 2022–2023: Phrae United (interim)
- 2023–2026: Songkhla
- 2026–: Police Tero
- * Club domestic league appearances and goals

Daiki Higuchi (樋口 大輝, Daiki Higuchi; born April 8, 1984 in Yatsushiro, Kumamoto) is a retired Japanese football player and Japanese football manager and who is the head coach Thai League 2 club of Police Tero.

== Managerial statistics ==
As of match played 14 February 2026

Managerial record by team and tenure
Team	From	To	Record				
Team	From	To	P	W	D	L	Win %
Songkhla	8 May 2021	15 November 2021	1	1	0	0	100.00
Songkhla	20 June 2023	15 February 2026	44	14	11	19	31.82
Police Tero	11 November 2026	present	1	1	0	0	100.00
Total			46	16	11	19	34.78

== Honour ==
Thai Honda FC

Thai Division 1 League Champion; 2016
