= Khelang United F.C. =

Khelang United เขลางค์ ยูไนเต็ด
- Full name: Khelang United Football Club
- Nicknames: พญาไก่ขาว (The King of White Cock, romanised Phraya Kai Khao)
- Founded: 2021; 5 years ago
- Ground: Lampang Provincial Stadium
- Capacity: 2,000
- Coordinates: 18°14′07″N 99°29′22″E
- Owner(s): Samosorn Khelang United Co., Ltd.
- Chairman: Kittipong Thepkam
- Head coach: Sirichai Chaiwiset
- League: Thai League 3
- 2025–26: Thai League 3, 4th of 12 in the Northern region
- Website: Facebook

Khelang United Football Club (Thai สโมสรฟุตบอล เขลางค์ ยูไนเต็ด), is a Thai football club based in Mueang, Lampang, Thailand. The club is currently playing in the Thai League 3 Northern region.

== History ==
In 2021, the club was established.

In 2022, the club was competed in Thailand Amateur League Northern region finished in 3rd placed.

In early 2023, the club was competed in Thailand Semi-Pro League Northern region finished in the 1st placed of the region and finished as the runners-up of the tournament, promoted to the Thai League 3.

== Stadium and locations ==
Coordinates	Location	Stadium	Year
18°14′07″N 99°29′22″E	Mueang, Lampang	Stadium of Lampang Rajabhat University	2023 – present

== Season by season record ==
Season	League									FA Cup	League Cup	T3 Cup	Top goalscorer	
Season	Division	P	W	D	L	F	A	Pts	Pos	FA Cup	League Cup	T3 Cup	Name	Goals
2022	TA North	6	2	4	0	13	4	10	3rd	Opted out	Ineligible		(Thailand) Mathas Kajaree	6
2023	TS North	8	5	3	0	19	6	18	1st	R2	Ineligible		(Thailand) Mathas Kajaree	8
2023–24	T3 North	20	5	6	9	17	26	21	8th	Opted out	QR1	R1	(Thailand) Mathas Kajaree	7
2024–25	T3 North	20	11	4	5	33	21	37	2nd	Opted out	QRP	LP	(Thailand) Mathas Kajaree	17
2025–26	T3 North	22	10	3	9	30	29	33	4th	Opted out	QRP	R16	(Brazil) Yuri Martins Roque	7
2026–27	T3 North										QR1			

Champions	Runners-up	Promoted	Relegated

- P = Played
- W = Games won
- D = Games drawn
- L = Games lost
- F = Goals for
- A = Goals against
- Pts = Points
- Pos = Final position
- QR1 = First Qualifying Round
- QR2 = Second Qualifying Round
- R1 = Round 1
- R2 = Round 2
- R3 = Round 3
- R4 = Round 4
- R5 = Round 5
- R6 = Round 6
- QF = Quarter-finals
- SF = Semi-finals
- RU = Runners-up
- W = Winners

== Players ==
=== Current squad ===
As of 1 September 2025

Note: Flags indicate national team as defined under FIFA eligibility rules; some limited exceptions apply. Players may hold more than one non-FIFA nationality.

No.	Pos.	Nation	Player
2	DF	THA	Thanyathon Fongkawee
3	DF	THA	Chanapong Foenta
4	DF	THA	Kantapol Sompittayanurak
5	DF	THA	Porntep Jankai
6	DF	THA	Panupong Jatimoon
7	FW	THA	Mathas Kajaree
8	MF	THA	Phuwadet Buasika
9	FW	THA	Arnon Thongpanya
11	MF	THA	Veerapat Mekhumrai
12	DF	THA	Thodsaphon Saichai
14	MF	THA	Ritthanuphap Jintanakong
15	DF	THA	Narathorn Suthipong
16	MF	THA	Chatchanan Tiutemwong
17	MF	THA	Bauaonnan Sukwiset
19	MF	THA	Kritsada Taiwong
20	DF	THA	Songpon Tongthong

No.	Pos.	Nation	Player
23	GK	THA	Lattaphon Kanchaing
24	GK	THA	Sirapop Inthap
26	DF	THA	Nattawut Outha
27	MF	CHN	Liu Chaoyang
31	MF	THA	Thanachok Chitrak
32	DF	THA	Chittaworn Muangkhun
35	MF	THA	Visit Donard
39	DF	THA	Nattakan Katrugsa
42	DF	THA	Cayanon Bunthep
44	DF	THA	Peerapat Chaisongkram
48	MF	THA	Siwakorn Pingwongsa
49	DF	THA	Oatsawin Kaeoraksa
56	MF	THA	Suwicha Chittabut
89	GK	THA	Nattapon Junlanan
99	FW	THA	Suksan Kaewpanya
