= Maejo United F.C. =

Thai football club

Maejo United แม่โจ้ ยูไนเต็ด
- Full name: Maejo United Football Club แม่โจ้ ยูไนเต็ด
- Nicknames: The Cowboy (เเม่โจ้คาวบอย)
- Founded: 2016; 10 years ago
- Ground: In Tha Nin Stadium; Chiang Mai, Thailand
- Capacity: 1,500
- Chairman: Narong Suvapab
- Manager: Chalaphan Poonead
- League: Thai League 3
- 2025–26: Thai League 3, 6th of 12 in the Northern region

Maejo United Football Club (Thai: แม่โจ้ ยูไนเต็ด) is a Thai football club based in Chiang Mai, Thailand. The club is currently playing in the Thai League 3 Northern region.

== History ==
In 2022, Maejo United competed in the Thai League 3 for the 2022–23 season. It is their 4th season in the professional league. The club started the season with a 0–4 away defeat to Uttaradit Saksiam and they ended the season with a 1–2 home defeat to Uttaradit Saksiam. The club has finished 7th place in the league of the Northern region. In addition, in the 2022–23 Thai FA Cup Maejo United was defeated 0–2 by Samut Prakan City in the first round, causing them to be eliminated.

== Stadium and locations ==
Coordinates	Location	Stadium	Year
18°53′53″N 99°00′47″E	San Sai District, Chiang Mai	Maejo University Stadium	2016–present

== Record ==
Season	League									FA Cup	League Cup	T3 Cup	Top goalscorer	
Season	Division	P	W	D	L	F	A	Pts	Pos	FA Cup	League Cup	T3 Cup	Name	Goals
2016	DIV 3 North	4	3	1	0	14	0	10	3rd	Opted out	Ineligible			
2017	TA North	6	4	2	0	25	7	14	3rd	Opted out	Ineligible			
2018	TA North	6	5	1	0	21	12	16	1st	Opted out	Ineligible		(Thailand) Sarawut Wongchai	5
2019	T4 North	27	15	8	4	72	29	53	3rd	Opted out	Opted out		(Thailand) Kritsada Tapingyot	15
2020–21	T3 North	15	10	3	2	23	8	33	2nd	R2	QR2		(Thailand) Wichaya Pornpresart	8
2021–22	T3 North	22	11	5	6	23	21	38	3rd	Opted out	Opted out		(Thailand) Ronnachai Pongputta	6
2022–23	T3 North	22	8	6	8	25	22	30	7th	R1	Opted out		(Ivory Coast) Oumar Sanou, (Thailand) Thongchai Oampornwiman	5
2023–24	T3 North	20	11	7	2	36	17	40	2nd	Opted out	Opted out	RU	(Thailand) Thongchai Oampornwiman	14
2024–25	T3 North	20	11	7	2	31	14	40	1st	Opted out	Opted out	LP	(Brazil) Douglas Mineiro	14
2025–26	T3 North	22	8	7	7	24	21	31	6th	Opted out	Opted out	LP	(Brazil) Douglas Mineiro	15

Champions	Runners-up	Promoted	Relegated

== Players ==
=== Current squad ===
As of 30 September 2026

Note: Flags indicate national team as defined under FIFA eligibility rules; some limited exceptions apply. Players may hold more than one non-FIFA nationality.

No.	Pos.	Nation	Player
1	GK	THA	Korndanai Khajitkanjana
2	DF	THA	Tanachat Chomchuen
5	DF	THA	Nukoolkit Krutyai
7	DF	THA	Vichitnan Kruaythong (captain)
8	MF	THA	Somroeng Hanchiaw
9	FW	BRA	Lucas Macedo
10	FW	THA	Thongchai Oampornwiwan
14	MF	THA	Muhammadnasay Kolaeh
16	MF	THA	Pongphan Khamkhiaw
17	DF	THA	Nawapon Krengkrad
18	GK	THA	Supachai Kongplam

No.	Pos.	Nation	Player
19	DF	THA	Thammawat Trailum
20	DF	THA	Poowapat Netthip
22	MF	THA	Jaturaporn Senkham
25	DF	ARG	Juan Odorisio
27	FW	BRA	Diego Patrocínio Nogueira Reis
45	GK	THA	Suppawat Srinothai
46	DF	THA	Nuttapong Deeduaychat
47	MF	THA	Montree Siriwattanasuwan
77	DF	THA	Kittipong Namsang
79	DF	THA	Siriphong Ainta
92	MF	THA	Phunapat Pukpun

== Personnel ==
=== Club staff ===
Position	Name
Manager	(Thailand) Chalaphan Poonead
Assistant Manager	(Thailand) Jaturong Tosuwan

== Honours ==
=== Domestic leagues ===
- Thai League 3 Northern Region
  - Winners (1): 2024–25
