= 2024–25 Thai League 3 Eastern Region =

Thai League 3 Eastern Region
- Season: 2024–25
- Dates: 14 September 2024 – 29 March 2025
- Champions: Navy
- Relegated: Samut Prakan
- T3 National Championship: Navy; Fleet
- Matches: 132
- Goals: 329 (2.49 per match)
- Top goalscorer: (Thailand) Somsak Musikaphan (11 goals; Fleet)
- Best goalkeeper: (Thailand) Apisit Gosila (9 clean sheets; Chachoengsao Hi-Tek)
- Biggest home win: 8 goals difference Navy 8–0 BFB Pattaya City (29 March 2025)
- Biggest away win: 4 goals difference Samut Prakan 0–4 Navy (28 September 2024); Marines 0–4 Navy (9 March 2025)
- Highest scoring: 9 goals Bankhai United 8–1 Marines (29 March 2025)
- Longest winning run: 7 matches Fleet
- Longest unbeaten run: 13 matches Fleet; Navy
- Longest winless run: 11 matches Toko Customs United
- Longest losing run: 5 matches Marines; Padriew City; Samut Prakan
- Highest attendance: 1,250; Padriew City 0–2 Chachoengsao Hi-Tek (19 October 2024)
- Lowest attendance: 0
- Total attendance: 28,789
- Average attendance: 230

The 2024–25 Thai League 3 Eastern Region is part of the 2024–25 Thai League 3 Regional Stage, consisting of 12 clubs located in the eastern region of Thailand, as well as some from the eastern part of the central region. Following regional adjustments, one club was reallocated from the former Bangkok Metropolitan Region (now the Central Region) to the Eastern Region to better align with geographical considerations. The season will commence on 14 September 2024, with clubs competing in a round-robin format featuring home-and-away matches. The Regional Stage will conclude on 29 March 2025, at which point the top two clubs will advance to the National Championship Stage, while the bottom-placed club will face relegation to the Thailand Semi-pro League for the following season. This stage exemplifies the competitive edge of clubs from the industrial and coastal areas, where football thrives amidst rapid development and strong community support.

== Seasonal Changes ==
=== Club redistribution ===
Samut Prakan was transferred from the Bangkok Metropolitan Region (currently Central Region) to the Eastern Region.

=== Relegation from Thai League 2 ===
Customs United, which was relegated from Thai League 2, has rebranded as Toko Customs United. The club has also made minor changes to its logo, altering the text from CUSTOMS UNITED to TOKO CUSTOMS UNITED, reflecting the new sponsorship and identity.

=== Promotion from Thailand Semi-pro League ===
Padriew City has been promoted to the Eastern Region from the Thailand Semi-pro League, contributing to the competitive landscape of the league.

=== Club licensing failures ===
Chanthaburi United was demoted to the Thailand Semi-pro League after failing to meet licensing standards, a significant loss for the region.

=== Relegation based on performance ===
Prachinburi City was relegated after finishing at the bottom of the table in the 2023–24 season.

=== Club logo changes ===
- ACDC modernized its logo by updating the typography to a more contemporary style.
- Navy introduced a completely new logo, moving away from the traditional emblem of the Royal Thai Navy to a sleeker, more modern design that still honors its military roots.

== Teams ==
=== Number of teams by province ===
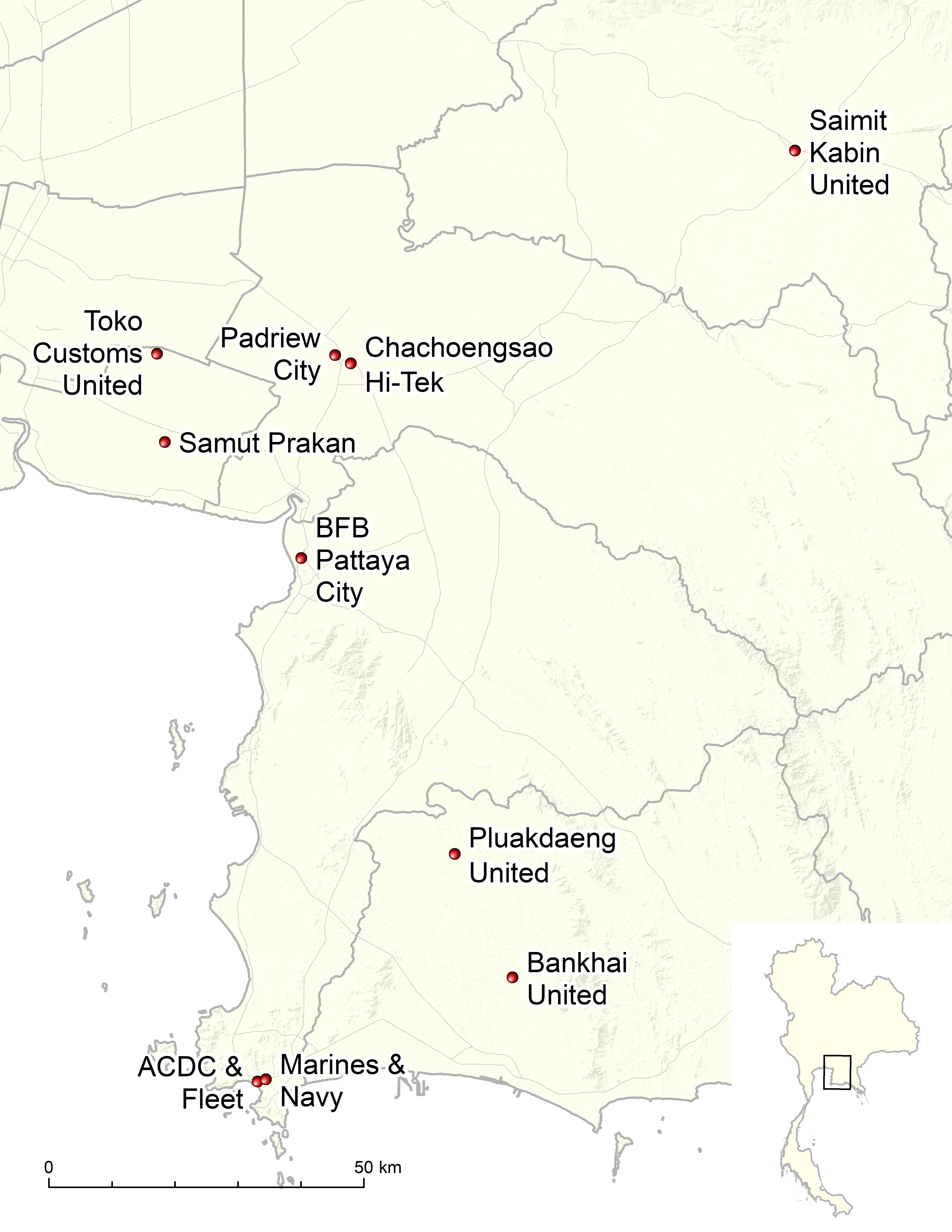
Locations of the 2024–25 Thai League 3 Eastern Region clubs.

Position	Province	Number	Teams
1	Chonburi	5	ACDC, BFB Pattaya City, Fleet, Marines, and Navy
2	Chachoengsao	2	Chachoengsao Hi-Tek and Padriew City
2	Rayong	2	Bankhai United and Pluakdaeng United
2	Samut Prakan	2	Samut Prakan and Toko Customs United
5	Prachinburi	1	Saimit Kabin United

=== Stadiums and locations ===
Team	Location	Stadium	Coordinates
ACDC	Chonburi (Sattahip)	Battleship Stadium	12°39′38″N 100°55′25″E
Bankhai United	Rayong (Ban Khai)	Wai Krong Stadium	12°48′26″N 101°17′51″E
BFB Pattaya City	Chonburi (Pattaya)	Nong Prue Stadium	12°55′28″N 100°56′14″E
Chachoengsao Hi-Tek	Chachoengsao (Mueang)	Chachoengsao Town Municipality Stadium	13°41′24″N 101°04′06″E
Fleet	Chonburi (Sattahip)	Battleship Stadium	12°39′38″N 100°55′25″E
Marines	Chonburi (Sattahip)	Sattahip Navy Stadium	12°39′49″N 100°56′09″E
Navy	Chonburi (Sattahip)	Sattahip Navy Stadium	12°39′49″N 100°56′09″E
Padriew City	Chachoengsao (Mueang)	Chachoengsao Provincial Stadium	13°42′07″N 101°02′44″E
Pluakdaeng United	Rayong (Pluak Daeng)	CK Stadium	12°59′06″N 101°12′52″E
Saimit Kabin United	Prachinburi (Kabin Buri)	Nomklao Maharat Stadium	13°59′20″N 101°43′25″E
Samut Prakan	Samut Prakan (Bang Sao Thong)	Samut Prakan Stadium	13°34′45″N 100°47′41″E
Toko Customs United	Samut Prakan (Bang Phli)	Stadium of Customs Department, Lad Krabang 54	13°42′22″N 100°47′03″E

=== Personnel and sponsoring ===
Note: Flags indicate national team as has been defined under FIFA eligibility rules. Players may hold more than one non-FIFA nationality; Club dissolved during season would shown by grey background.

Team	Manager	Captain	Kit
ACDC	(Thailand) Surakit Thepmanee		(Thailand) ROSport
Bankhai United	(Thailand) Nopphorn Ekasatra		(Thailand) 2S Sport
BFB Pattaya City			(Thailand) Made by club
Chachoengsao Hi-Tek	(Thailand) Thanath Boonlap		(Thailand) Imane
Fleet	(Thailand) Wiriya Phaophan		(Thailand) MT Sport
Marines	(Thailand) Nakin Thammasuwan		(Thailand) Work Sport
Navy	(Thailand) Somchai Chuayboonchum		(Thailand) FBT
Padriew City	(Thailand) Thanakorn Phatsri		(Thailand) Uptoyou Sport
Pluakdaeng United			(Thailand) CK Sport
Saimit Kabin United	(Thailand) Sorrasak Ratson		(Thailand) FBT
Samut Prakan	(Thailand) Tanaboon Kanato		(Thailand) Next Design
Toko Customs United	(Japan) Keita Goto	(Thailand) Ronnachai Rangsiyo	(Japan) Jogarbola

=== Foreign players ===
A T3 team could register 3 foreign players from foreign players all around the world. A team can use 3 foreign players on the field in each game.

Note :
(substituted off) : players who released during second leg transfer window;
(substituted on) : players who registered during second leg transfer window.

AFC member countries players.
CAF member countries players.
CONCACAF member countries players.
CONMEBOL member countries players.
OFC member countries players.
UEFA member countries players.
No foreign player registered.

Club	Leg	Player 1	Player 2	Player 3
ACDC	1st		(England) Benjamin Anthony Dixon (substituted off)	(Japan) Ken Hagihara
ACDC	2nd	(Germany) Dennis Yves-Pascal Francé (substituted on)	(Nigeria) Mubarak Mohammed Ahmed (substituted on)	(Japan) Ken Hagihara
Bankhai United	1st	(Brazil) Lucas Massaro Garcia Gama (substituted off)	(Nigeria) John Owoeri (substituted off)	(Brazil) Lucas Daubermann
Bankhai United	2nd	(Brazil) Erivelto (substituted on)	(South Korea) Lim Jae-hyeok (substituted on)	(Brazil) Lucas Daubermann
BFB Pattaya City	1st	(Ivory Coast) Joseph Louis Kissi (substituted off)	(Hong Kong) Chiu Ching-Yu Sergio (substituted off)	(South Korea) Kim Kyung-soo
BFB Pattaya City	2nd	(Ivory Coast) Kourouma Mohamed (substituted on)	(South Korea) Bae Eun-ho (substituted on)	(South Korea) Kim Kyung-soo
Chachoengsao Hi-Tek	1st	(Ivory Coast) Kourouma Mohamed (substituted off)	(Cameroon) Nyamsi Jacques Dominique	(Japan) Hideto Ozaki
Chachoengsao Hi-Tek	2nd	(Japan) Shunya Ando (substituted on)	(Cameroon) Nyamsi Jacques Dominique	(Japan) Hideto Ozaki
Fleet	1st	(Sweden) David Emannuel Danielsson (substituted off)	(Brazil) Osvaldo Nascimento dos Santos Neto	(Cameroon) Lionel Frank Touko Nzola
Fleet	2nd	(Uruguay) Pedro Manzi (substituted on)	(Brazil) Osvaldo Nascimento dos Santos Neto	(Cameroon) Lionel Frank Touko Nzola
Marines	1st	(Italy) Simone Valli (substituted off)	(Haiti) Seide Jean-Luc Olivier (substituted off)	(Northern Ireland) Nicholas Demetri
Marines	2nd	(Ghana) Isaac Aboagye (substituted on)	(Japan) Masahiro Fujiwara (substituted on)	(Northern Ireland) Nicholas Demetri
Navy	1st	(Brazil) Cássio de Jesus (substituted off)	(Brazil) Luan Santos	(Argentina) Panigazzi Matías Ignacio
Navy	2nd	(Brazil) Gustavo Alexandre Barbosa do Nascimento (substituted on)	(Brazil) Luan Santos	(Argentina) Panigazzi Matías Ignacio
Padriew City	1st	(South Korea) Lee Gi-been (substituted off)	(South Korea) Um Da-bin	(South Korea) Kim Min-kap
Padriew City	2nd	(Nigeria) Jeremiah Kegbe (substituted on)	(South Korea) Um Da-bin	(South Korea) Kim Min-kap
Pluakdaeng United	1st	(Brazil) Thiago de Jesús dos Santos (substituted off)	(Egypt) Ahmed Saad Lotfy Elnoamany (substituted off)	(Ghana) Bernard Owusu Mintah
Pluakdaeng United	2nd	(Brazil) Francisco Jadson Silva do Nascimento (substituted on)	(Ivory Coast) Kaly Wilfried Dagno (substituted on)	(Ghana) Bernard Owusu Mintah
Saimit Kabin United	1st	(Brazil) Luan Borges Machado Martins (substituted off)	(Nigeria) Bright Friday (substituted off)	(Nigeria) Ademola Sodiq Adeyemi
Saimit Kabin United	2nd	(Brazil) Lucas Vinícius Prati (substituted on)	(Brazil) Guilherme Moreira (substituted on)	(Nigeria) Ademola Sodiq Adeyemi
Samut Prakan	1st	(Ghana) Isaac Aboagye (substituted off)	(South Korea) Shim Pyo-chan (substituted off)	(Australia) Nicholas Edward Boyd
Samut Prakan	2nd	(Germany) Alexander Uselmann (substituted on)	(South Korea) Lee Byeong-seop (substituted on)	(Australia) Nicholas Edward Boyd
Toko Customs United	1st		(Japan) Takuto Hirao (substituted off)	(Japan) Taiga Matsunaga (substituted off)
Toko Customs United	2nd	(Guinea) Conde Mamoudou (substituted on)	(Japan) Rikiya Yamada (substituted on)	(Japan) Hiroto Takeda (substituted on)

== League table ==
=== Standings ===
Pos	Team	Pld	W	D	L	GF	GA	GD	Pts	Qualification or relegation
1	Navy (C, Q)	22	15	6	1	49	14	+35	51	Qualification to the National Championship stage
2	Fleet (Q)	22	13	6	3	38	19	+19	45	Qualification to the National Championship stage
3	Bankhai United	22	9	9	4	31	16	+15	36	
4	Saimit Kabin United	22	9	7	6	25	23	+2	34	
5	ACDC	22	9	5	8	34	31	+3	32 (Note: ACDC ahead on head-to-head record; ACDC 3 pts (GD +1), Pluakdaeng United 3 pts (GD -1).)	
6	Pluakdaeng United	22	8	8	6	27	23	+4	32	
7	Chachoengsao Hi-Tek	22	7	8	7	19	20	−1	29	
8	Padriew City	22	7	5	10	26	30	−4	26	
9	BFB Pattaya City	22	7	4	11	26	36	−10	25	
10	Marines	22	5	5	12	26	43	−17	20	
11	Toko Customs United	22	4	7	11	18	28	−10	19	
12	Samut Prakan (R)	22	2	4	16	10	46	−36	10	Relegation to the Thailand Semi-pro League

Source: Thai League
Rules for classification: 1) Points; 2) Head-to-head points; 3) Head-to-head goal difference; 4) Head-to-head goal scored; 5) Overall goal difference; 6) Overall goal scored; 7) Fair play points; 8) Play-off without extra time).
(C) Champions; (Q) Qualified for the phase indicated; (R) Relegated

=== Positions by round ===
Team ╲ Round	1	2	3	4	5	6	7	8	9	10	11	12	13	14	15	16	17	18	19	20	21	22
Navy	3	1	1	1	1	1	1	1	1	1	1	1	1	1	1	1	1	1	1	1	1	1
Fleet	12	6	2	3	2	2	2	2	3	3	2	2	2	2	2	2	2	2	2	2	2	2
Bankhai United	2	5	6	6	4	3	3	5	2	2	3	3	3	3	3	3	3	3	3	3	3	3
Saimit Kabin United	5	4	7	2	3	4	5	3	4	5	4	5	4	5	4	5	6	5	5	5	4	4
ACDC	6	7	5	8	5	7	8	7	5	4	5	4	5	4	6	6	5	6	6	6	5	5
Pluakdaeng United	1	3	4	5	8	8	10	10	10	10	8	6	6	6	5	4	4	4	4	4	6	6
Chachoengsao Hi-Tek	7	2	3	4	7	5	4	6	7	7	6	9	9	8	9	7	7	7	8	8	7	7
Padriew City	4	9	8	7	6	6	6	4	6	6	7	8	7	7	8	9	9	10	10	9	9	8
BFB Pattaya City	11	12	12	12	12	10	9	9	8	8	9	7	8	9	7	8	8	8	7	7	8	9
Marines	10	11	10	9	9	11	11	12	12	11	11	11	11	11	11	10	10	9	9	10	10	10
Toko Customs United	9	10	11	10	10	9	7	8	9	9	10	10	10	10	10	11	11	11	11	11	11	11
Samut Prakan	8	8	9	11	11	12	12	11	11	12	12	12	12	12	12	12	12	12	12	12	12	12

Source: Thai League
= Qualification to the National Championship stage; = Relegation to the Thailand Semi-pro League

=== Results by round ===
Team ╲ Round	1	2	3	4	5	6	7	8	9	10	11	12	13	14	15	16	17	18	19	20	21	22
Navy	W	W	W	W	W	W	D	W	W	W	W	D	W	L	D	W	D	D	W	W	D	W
Fleet	L	W	W	D	W	W	D	L	L	W	W	W	W	W	W	W	D	W	D	W	D	D
Bankhai United	W	D	D	D	W	W	D	L	W	W	D	L	D	W	W	W	D	D	D	L	L	W
Saimit Kabin United	D	W	L	W	W	L	D	W	L	L	W	D	W	D	D	L	D	W	W	L	W	D
ACDC	D	D	W	L	W	L	L	W	W	D	D	W	L	W	L	L	W	L	D	W	W	L
Pluakdaeng United	W	D	D	D	L	L	L	D	W	L	W	W	W	D	W	D	W	W	L	L	D	D
Chachoengsao Hi-Tek	D	W	D	D	L	W	W	L	D	D	L	L	D	L	D	W	W	L	L	W	D	W
Padriew City	D	L	W	D	W	L	W	W	L	L	L	D	W	L	L	L	L	L	D	W	W	D
BFB Pattaya City	L	L	L	D	L	W	W	D	W	D	L	W	L	L	W	D	L	W	W	L	L	L
Marines	L	L	D	D	L	L	L	L	L	W	D	L	L	W	D	W	W	W	L	L	D	L
Toko Customs United	D	L	L	D	L	W	W	D	D	L	L	D	L	D	L	L	L	L	W	L	D	W
Samut Prakan	D	D	L	L	L	L	L	D	L	L	W	L	L	D	L	L	L	L	L	W	L	L

Source: Thai League
W = Won; D = Drawn; L = Lost

=== Results ===
Home \ Away	ACD	BKI	BPC	CCH	FLT	MRE	NVY	PRC	PDU	KBU	SPK	CTU
ACDC	—	2–0	3–1	0–0	0–2	1–3	2–0	3–1	4–1	3–2	5–0	0–2
Bankhai United	0–0	—	2–2	1–1	1–0	8–1	0–1	0–2	0–0	0–0	3–0	2–0
BFB Pattaya City	1–1	0–2	—	2–0	0–2	2–0	0–1	1–0	3–3	1–2	4–0	1–0
Chachoengsao Hi-Tek	1–0	1–1	2–0	—	1–2	1–1	0–3	2–1	1–0	0–2	1–0	0–0
Fleet	3–0	0–0	2–1	2–2	—	1–0	1–1	0–1	2–2	1–0	3–0	2–0
Marines	1–3	1–2	1–0	1–1	3–5	—	0–4	1–0	1–1	1–2	3–1	2–1
Navy	4–1	2–2	8–0	0–0	1–1	2–1	—	3–2	2–1	2–0	1–0	2–0
Padriew City	3–3	0–2	3–2	0–2	1–2	0–0	1–1	—	1–0	2–2	4–0	1–0
Pluakdaeng United	3–1	2–1	0–1	1–0	2–0	2–1	1–1	1–0	—	0–1	0–0	0–0
Saimit Kabin United	3–1	0–0	2–1	1–0	0–1	2–2	0–3	1–1	0–1	—	1–0	3–2
Samut Prakan	0–0	0–2	1–2	0–2	0–3	2–1	0–4	4–1	2–5	0–0	—	0–1
Toko Customs United	0–1	1–2	1–1	2–1	3–3	2–1	1–3	0–1	1–1	1–1	0–0	—

Source: Thai League
Legend: Blue = home team win; Yellow = draw; Red = away team win.
For upcoming matches, an "a" indicates there is an article about the rivalry between the two participants.

== Season statistics ==
=== Top scorers ===
As of 29 March 2025.

Rank	Player	Club	Goals
1	(Thailand) Somsak Musikaphan	Fleet	11
2	(Thailand) Supasan Arjrod	Chachoengsao Hi-Tek	8
2	(Thailand) Thanphisit Hempandan	Navy	8
2	(Argentina) Matias Panigazzi	Navy	8
5	(Brazil) Luan Santos	Navy	7

=== Hat-tricks ===
Player	For	Against	Result	Date
(Australia) Nicholas Boyd	Samut Prakan	Padriew City	4–1 (H)	23 November 2024
(Thailand) Thanphisit Hempandan	Navy	BFB Pattaya City	8–0 (H)	29 March 2025
(Brazil) Erivelto^{4}	Bankhai United	Marines	8–1 (H)	29 March 2025

Notes: (H) = Home team; (A) = Away team

=== Clean sheets ===
As of 29 March 2025.

Rank	Player	Club	Clean sheets
1	(Thailand) Apisit Gosila	Chachoengsao Hi-Tek	9
2	(Thailand) Peerapong Watjanapayon	Fleet	8
3	(Thailand) Prapat Yoskrai	Bankhai United	7
4	(Thailand) Kandanai Kingmahasombat	BFB Pattaya City	6
4	(Thailand) Varuth Wongsomsak	Navy	6

== Attendances ==
=== Overall statistical table ===
Pos	Team	Total	High	Low	Average	Change
1	Chachoengsao Hi-Tek	4,746	705	208	431	+39.9%
2	Padriew City	3,545	1,250	80	322	−31.5%^{↑}
3	Navy	2,817	450	0	282	+12.4%
4	Bankhai United	2,492	445	0	277	+32.5%
5	BFB Pattaya City	2,632	409	120	239	+27.1%
6	Toko Customs United	2,404	450	111	219	−22.9%^{↓}
7	Pluakdaeng United	2,300	315	100	209	0.0%
8	Marines	2,062	250	60	187	+18.4%
9	ACDC	1,663	275	105	166	0.0%
10	Fleet	1,691	225	109	154	−2.5%
11	Saimit Kabin United	1,310	250	0	146	−15.6%
12	Samut Prakan	1,127	184	0	113	+9.7%
	League total	28,789	1,250	0	230	+8.0%

Updated to games played on 29 March 2025
Source: Thai League

=== Attendances by home match played ===
Team \ Match played	1	2	3	4	5	6	7	8	9	10	11	Total
ACDC	275	175	179	155	250	105	155	Unk.4	105	135	129	1,663
Bankhai United	423	266	251	445	166	272	233	200	Unk.5	236	Unk.7	2,492
BFB Pattaya City	196	126	120	409	194	270	315	212	254	270	266	2,632
Chachoengsao Hi-Tek	504	498	649	502	383	314	349	705	369	265	208	4,746
Fleet	145	123	175	109	155	119	170	115	225	205	150	1,691
Marines	243	185	125	250	200	223	186	215	175	200	60	2,062
Navy	Unk.1	180	250	300	250	400	450	150	270	253	314	2,817
Padriew City	485	150	250	1,250	180	280	250	150	120	80	350	3,545
Pluakdaeng United	215	200	270	210	100	315	250	180	250	140	170	2,300
Saimit Kabin United	105	Unk.2	200	200	120	107	108	Unk.3	90	130	250	1,310
Samut Prakan	150	184	106	138	94	90	80	85	80	Unk.6	120	1,127
Toko Customs United	205	300	200	250	178	267	131	112	111	200	450	2,404

Note:
Unk.1 Some error of T3 official match report 22 September 2024 (Navy 3–2 Padriew City).
Unk.2 Some error of T3 official match report 5 October 2024 (Saimit Kabin United 1–0 Samut Prakan).
Unk.3 Some error of T3 official match report 15 February 2025 (Saimit Kabin United 0–3 Navy).
Unk.4 Some error of T3 official match report 16 February 2025 (ACDC 0–3 Fleet).
Unk.5 Some error of T3 official match report 23 February 2025 (Bankhai United 0–0 Saimit Kabin United).
Unk.6 Some error of T3 official match report 16 March 2025 (Samut Prakan 2–1 Marines).
Unk.7 Some error of T3 official match report 29 March 2025 (Bankhai United 8–1 Marines).
