= 2023–24 Thai League 3 Eastern Region =

Thai League 3 Eastern Region
- Season: 2023–24
- Dates: 16 September 2023 – 24 February 2024
- Champions: Saimit Kabin United
- Relegated: Chanthaburi United; Prachinburi City
- T3 National Championship: Saimit Kabin United; Bankhai United
- Matches: 110
- Goals: 264 (2.4 per match)
- Top goalscorer: (Brazil) Emerson da Silva Tavares (10 goals; Chanthaburi United)
- Best goalkeeper: (Thailand) Sutthiphong Khamnikon (10 clean sheets; Saimit Kabin United)
- Biggest home win: 7 goals difference Navy 8–1 Marines (20 January 2024)
- Biggest away win: 7 goals difference Prachinburi City 0–7 Navy (24 February 2024)
- Highest scoring: 9 goals Navy 8–1 Marines (20 January 2024)
- Longest winning run: 8 matches Saimit Kabin United
- Longest unbeaten run: 11 matches Pluakdaeng United
- Longest winless run: 12 matches Prachinburi City
- Longest losing run: 12 matches Prachinburi City

The 2023–24 Thai League 3 Eastern region is a region in the regional stage of the 2023–24 Thai League 3. The tournament was sponsored by Rising Sun fertilizer, and known as the Rising Sun Fertilizer League for sponsorship purposes. A total of 11 teams located in Eastern of Thailand will compete in the league of the Eastern region.

== Changes from last season ==
=== Promotion or relegation ===
Team	League		Notes
Team	Previous season	Current season	Notes
From Thai League 3
Chanthaburi (substituted on)	Thai League 3	Thai League 2	
Pattaya United (substituted on)	Thai League 3	Thai League 2	Renamed from Pattaya Dolphins United F.C. to Pattaya United F.C.
Banbueng (substituted off)	Thai League 3	Thailand Semi-pro League	
To Thai League 3
Prachinburi City (substituted on)	Thailand Semi-pro League	Thai League 3	
BFB Pattaya City (substituted on)	Thailand Semi-pro League	Thai League 3	

=== Renaming ===
Team	Old name	Current name
Chanthaburi United	Assawin Kohkwang United F.C.	Chanthaburi United F.C.

== Teams ==
=== Number of teams by province ===
Position	Province	Number	Teams
1	Chonburi	5	ACDC, BFB Pattaya City, Fleet, Marines, and Navy
2	Prachinburi	2	Prachinburi City and Saimit Kabin United
2	Rayong	2	Bankhai United and Pluakdaeng United
4	Chachoengsao	1	Chachoengsao Hi-Tek
4	Chanthaburi	1	Chanthaburi United

=== Stadiums and locations ===
Locations of the 2023–24 Thai League 3 Eastern region teams

Team	Location	Stadium	Coordinates
ACDC	Chonburi (Sattahip)	Battleship Stadium	12°39′38″N 100°55′25″E
Bankhai United	Rayong (Ban Khai)	Wai Krong Stadium	12°48′26″N 101°17′51″E
BFB Pattaya City	Chonburi (Si Racha)	Si Racha Town Municipality Stadium	13°10′20″N 100°55′41″E
Chachoengsao Hi-Tek	Chachoengsao (Mueang)	Chachoengsao Town Municipality Stadium	13°41′24″N 101°04′06″E
Chanthaburi United	Chanthaburi (Mueang)	Stadium of Rambhai Barni Rajabhat University	12°39′50″N 102°06′06″E
Fleet	Chonburi (Sattahip)	Battleship Stadium	12°39′38″N 100°55′25″E
Marines	Chonburi (Sattahip)	Sattahip Navy Stadium	12°39′49″N 100°56′09″E
Navy	Chonburi (Sattahip)	Sattahip Navy Stadium	12°39′49″N 100°56′09″E
Pluakdaeng United	Rayong (Pluak Daeng)	CK Stadium	12°59′06″N 101°12′52″E
Prachinburi City	Prachinburi (Mueang)	Prachinburi PAO. Stadium	14°03′52″N 101°22′30″E
Saimit Kabin United	Prachinburi (Kabin Buri)	Nomklao Maharat Stadium	13°59′20″N 101°43′25″E

=== Foreign players ===
A T3 team could register 3 foreign players from foreign players all around the world. A team can use 3 foreign players on the field in each game.

Note :
(substituted off) : players who released during second leg transfer window;
(substituted on) : players who registered during second leg transfer window.

AFC member countries players.
CAF member countries players.
CONCACAF member countries players.
CONMEBOL member countries players.
OFC member countries players.
UEFA member countries players.
No foreign player registered.

Club	Leg	Player 1	Player 2	Player 3
ACDC	1st			(Italy) Simone Valli (substituted off)
ACDC	2nd	(Germany) Flodyn Ruchelvy Ulrich Baloki (substituted on)	(Guinea) Abdoul Karim Sylla (substituted on)	(Guinea) Barry Lelouma (substituted on)
Bankhai United	1st	(Saint Kitts and Nevis) Tishan Tajahni Hanley (substituted off)	(Japan) Seiya Sugishita (substituted off)	(Australia) Ndlovu Mandlenkosi (substituted off)
Bankhai United	2nd		(Brazil) Ranieri Luiz Barbosa (substituted on)	(Republic of the Congo) Burnel Okana-Stazi (substituted on)
BFB Pattaya City	1st	(Russia) Aleksandr Shurchilin (substituted off)	(Iran) Kourosh Sheydaei Manesh (substituted off)	(American Samoa) Goff Jr. McKeith
BFB Pattaya City	2nd	(Japan) Taiyo Toyoda (substituted on)	(South Korea) Kim Jun-hyeon (substituted on)	(American Samoa) Goff Jr. McKeith
Chachoengsao Hi-Tek	1st		(Cameroon) Nyamsi Jacques Dominique	(Madagascar) Guy Hubert
Chachoengsao Hi-Tek	2nd	(Ivory Coast) Kourouma Mohamed (substituted on)	(Cameroon) Nyamsi Jacques Dominique	(Madagascar) Guy Hubert
Chanthaburi United	1st	(Brazil) Marcos Wilder da Silva Santos (substituted off)	(Brazil) Luiz Fernando Queiroz Dias	(Brazil) Emerson da Silva Tavares
Chanthaburi United	2nd	(Brazil) Cláudio (substituted on)	(Brazil) Luiz Fernando Queiroz Dias	(Brazil) Emerson da Silva Tavares
Fleet	1st
Fleet	2nd	(South Korea) Baek Dong-ju (substituted on)
Marines	1st	(Brazil) Cláudio (substituted off)	(Belgium) Bilal Akodad (substituted off)	(Russia) Pavel Ganichev
Marines	2nd		(Northern Ireland) Nicholas Demetri (substituted on)	(Russia) Pavel Ganichev
Navy	1st	(Brazil) Thiago de Jesús dos Santos (substituted off)	(Russia) Erik Zaerko (substituted off)	(Ghana) Obed Kofi Sam
Navy	2nd	(Cameroon) Alex Mermoz Djatche Nandje (substituted on)	(Ivory Coast) Diarra Junior Aboubacar (substituted on)	(Ghana) Obed Kofi Sam
Pluakdaeng United	1st	(Ghana) Bernard Owusu Mintah	(South Korea) Joh Seung-won (substituted off)	(Myanmar) Lian Biak Tuang (substituted off)
Pluakdaeng United	2nd	(Ghana) Bernard Owusu Mintah	(Egypt) Ahmed Saad Lotfy Elnoamany (substituted on)	(Ghana) Ellis Worwornyo (substituted on)
Prachinburi City	1st
Prachinburi City	2nd	(Italy) Leo Antonio Anthony (substituted on)	(Cameroon) Arsene Carmel Mbe Doungli (substituted on)
Saimit Kabin United	1st	(Brazil) Guilherme Moreira (substituted off)	(South Korea) Kim Jun-hyeon (substituted off)	(Brazil) Emerson Felipe Alves Peixoto de Almeida
Saimit Kabin United	2nd	(Brazil) Abner Gomes Faria (substituted on)	(Cameroon) Cedrick Platini Kaham (substituted on)	(Brazil) Emerson Felipe Alves Peixoto de Almeida

== League table ==
=== Standings ===
Pos	Team	Pld	W	D	L	GF	GA	GD	Pts	Qualification or relegation
1	Saimit Kabin United (C, Q)	20	13	4	3	23	7	+16	43	Qualification to the National Championship stage
2	Bankhai United (Q)	20	13	3	4	30	14	+16	42	Qualification to the National Championship stage
3	Pluakdaeng United	20	9	7	4	36	20	+16	34	
4	Navy	20	7	7	6	38	20	+18	28	
5	Chachoengsao Hi-Tek	20	7	5	8	28	22	+6	26	
6	Chanthaburi United (R)	20	7	4	9	21	21	0	25	Relegation to the Thailand Semi-pro League (Note: Chanthaburi United was administratively relegated to the 2025 Thailand Semi-pro League for failing to meet club licensing standards.)
7	Fleet	20	5	9	6	24	26	−2	24 (Note: The head-to-head record is tied; Fleet 2 pts (GD 0), BFB Pattaya City 2 pts (GD 0). Fleet is ahead on the overall goals difference.)	
8	BFB Pattaya City	20	6	6	8	23	28	−5	24	
9	Marines	20	5	8	7	17	32	−15	23	
10	ACDC	20	4	7	9	15	32	−17	19	
11	Prachinburi City (R)	20	3	2	15	9	42	−33	11	Relegation to the Thailand Semi-pro League

Source: Thai League
Rules for classification: 1) Points; 2) Head-to-head points; 3) Head-to-head goal difference; 4) Head-to-head goal scored; 5) Overall goal difference; 6) Overall goal scored; 7) Fair play points; 8) Play-off without extra time).
(C) Champions; (Q) Qualified for the phase indicated; (R) Relegated

=== Positions by round ===
Team ╲ Round	1	2	3	4	5	6	7	8	9	10	11	12	13	14	15	16	17	18	19	20	21	22
Saimit Kabin United	4	4	3	5	6	4	3	4	2	2	2	3	3	3	3	3	3	3	2	1	1	1
Bankhai United	6	7	6	4	3	5	4	2	3	3	3	4	2	1	1	1	1	1	3	2	2	2
Pluakdaeng United	1	2	4	1	2	2	1	1	1	1	1	1	1	2	2	2	2	2	1	3	3	3
Navy	3	3	1	3	1	1	2	3	4	4	4	2	4	5	4	4	4	5	5	5	5	4
Chachoengsao Hi-Tek	9	10	9	11	11	11	8	10	10	10	10	10	9	7	10	10	8	6	6	6	4	5
Chanthaburi United	7	6	5	7	4	6	7	6	7	7	5	5	5	6	6	7	5	4	4	4	6	6
Fleet	8	9	10	10	10	7	6	7	8	9	7	8	7	8	7	9	9	9	7	9	9	7
BFB Pattaya City	2	1	2	2	5	3	5	5	5	5	6	7	8	9	8	5	6	7	8	7	7	8
Marines	10	5	8	9	9	9	10	9	9	6	8	6	6	4	5	6	7	8	9	8	8	9
ACDC	5	8	11	8	8	10	11	11	11	11	11	11	10	10	9	8	10	10	10	10	10	10
Prachinburi City	11	11	7	6	7	8	9	8	6	8	9	9	11	11	11	11	11	11	11	11	11	11

Source: Thai League
= Qualification to the National Championship stage; = Relegation to the Thailand Semi-pro League

=== Results by round ===
Team ╲ Round	1	2	3	4	5	6	7	8	9	10	11	12	13	14	15	16	17	18	19	20	21	22
Saimit Kabin United	W	N	W	L	L	W	W	D	W	D	D	N	D	L	W	W	W	W	W	W	W	W
Bankhai United	D	L	W	W	D	L	W	W	N	D	W	L	W	W	W	W	L	W	N	W	W	W
Pluakdaeng United	W	D	N	W	D	W	W	D	W	D	D	D	N	L	W	D	W	W	W	L	L	L
Navy	W	D	W	N	W	W	L	L	L	D	W	D	L	N	D	W	D	L	L	D	D	W
Chachoengsao Hi-Tek	L	D	L	L	D	N	W	L	W	L	L	D	W	W	L	N	W	W	D	D	W	L
Chanthaburi United	N	D	W	L	W	L	L	W	L	D	W	W	D	L	L	L	W	W	L	D	L	N
Fleet	L	D	L	D	D	W	W	L	L	N	W	D	D	D	D	L	D	L	W	N	D	W
BFB Pattaya City	W	W	L	D	L	W	L	D	L	W	N	L	L	D	D	W	L	L	D	W	N	D
Marines	L	W	L	D	D	L	N	D	W	W	L	W	D	W	L	L	N	L	D	D	D	D
ACDC	D	L	L	W	D	L	L	N	L	D	L	W	W	W	D	D	L	N	D	L	D	L
Prachinburi City	L	D	W	D	N	L	L	W	W	L	L	L	L	L	N	L	L	L	L	L	L	L

Source: Thai League
N = No match; W = Won; D = Drawn; L = Lost

=== Results ===
Home \ Away	ACD	BKI	BPC	CCH	CTU	FLT	MRE	NVY	PDU	PCC	SKU
ACDC	—	0–1	1–3	0–2	1–0	0–0	1–2	1–4	0–6	1–0	0–1
Bankhai United	1–1	—	2–1	1–1	0–1	4–0	0–1	3–1	1–1	5–0	1–0
BFB Pattaya City	1–2	0–1	—	1–1	2–0	0–0	2–0	1–1	0–0	2–1	0–3
Chachoengsao Hi-Tek	4–0	0–1	4–1	—	0–2	1–1	0–0	2–1	2–3	4–0	0–1
Chanthaburi United	1–2	1–2	1–3	0–1	—	3–2	2–0	0–0	1–2	3–0	1–0
Fleet	1–1	2–0	1–1	0–0	1–2	—	2–2	0–0	1–3	4–1	1–2
Marines	2–2	3–2	1–1	2–1	1–1	0–1	—	0–3	1–4	0–0	0–0
Navy	2–2	0–1	3–0	3–2	1–1	0–2	8–1	—	1–1	2–0	0–1
Pluakdaeng United	0–0	0–1	4–2	1–2	2–1	2–3	0–0	1–1	—	3–0	0–0
Prachinburi City	1–0	0–1	0–1	2–1	0–0	3–1	0–1	0–7	1–3	—	0–2
Saimit Kabin United	0–0	1–2	2–1	2–0	1–0	1–1	2–0	1–0	2–0	1–0	—

Source: Thai League
Legend: Blue = home team win; Yellow = draw; Red = away team win.
For upcoming matches, an "a" indicates there is an article about the rivalry between the two participants.

== Season statistics ==
=== Top scorers ===
As of 24 February 2024.

Rank	Player	Club	Goals
1	(Brazil) Emerson da Silva Tavares	Chanthaburi United	10
2	(Thailand) Achirawat Saimee	BFB Pattaya City	8
2	(Thailand) Jakkarin Yaukyen	Pluakdaeng United	8
4	(Cameroon) Nyamsi Jacques Dominique	Chachoengsao Hi-Tek	7
4	(Thailand) Worachet Prapaipak	Marines (2 Goals); Navy (5 Goals)	7

=== Hat-tricks ===
Player	For	Against	Result	Date
(Russia) Erik Zaerko	Navy	Marines	0–3 (A)	22 October 2023
(Thailand) Worachet Prapaipak	Navy	Marines	8–1 (H)	20 January 2024
(Ivory Coast) Diarra Junior Aboubacar	Navy	Marines	8–1 (H)	20 January 2024
(Republic of the Congo) Burnel Okana-Stazi	Bankhai United	Prachinburi City	5–0 (H)	18 February 2024

Notes: (H) = Home team; (A) = Away team

=== Clean sheets ===
As of 24 February 2024.

Rank	Player	Club	Clean sheets
1	(Thailand) Sutthiphong Khamnikon	Saimit Kabin United	10
2	(Thailand) Chairat Ketsaratikun	Chanthaburi United	6
2	(Thailand) Peerapong Watjanapayon	Fleet	6
4	(Thailand) Siwat Rawangpa	Bankhai United	5
4	(Thailand) Nattakitt Kanapornthawornpat	BFB Pattaya City	5
4	(Thailand) Apisit Gosila	Chachoengsao Hi-Tek (5)	5

== Attendances ==
=== Overall statistical table ===
Pos	Team	Total	High	Low	Average	Change
1	Prachinburi City	3,599	510	186	360	n/a
2	Chachoengsao Hi-Tek	2,774	474	0	308	−15.4%
3	Navy	2,258	520	0	251	+5.9%
4	Bankhai United	2,092	360	60	209	+27.4%
5	Pluakdaeng United	2,090	320	150	209	−2.3%
6	BFB Pattaya City	1,883	281	94	188	−65.5%
7	Saimit Kabin United	1,557	220	0	173	+20.1%
8	ACDC	1,495	246	0	166	+1.2%
9	Chanthaburi United	1,648	378	105	165	+0.6%
10	Fleet	1,577	315	95	158	−6.5%
11	Marines	1,419	280	0	158	−10.2%
	League total	22,392	520	0	213	−8.6%

Updated to games played on 24 February 2024
Source: Thai League

=== Attendances by home match played ===
Team \ Match played	1	2	3	4	5	6	7	8	9	10	Total
ACDC	246	145	155	213	203	103	155	130	145	Unk.5	1,495
Bankhai United	230	360	262	210	191	60	151	210	158	260	2,092
BFB Pattaya City	281	202	174	211	220	198	136	209	158	94	1,883
Chachoengsao Hi-Tek	314	Unk.1	258	291	200	168	314	375	380	474	2,774
Chanthaburi United	236	378	132	175	105	121	109	163	112	117	1,648
Fleet	135	102	200	115	105	95	149	315	150	211	1,577
Marines	154	280	278	85	155	Unk.3	127	120	120	100	1,419
Navy	370	150	155	Unk.2	220	520	180	165	298	200	2,258
Pluakdaeng United	250	250	190	170	150	250	210	150	320	150	2,090
Prachinburi City	351	510	399	404	420	503	336	240	186	250	3,599
Saimit Kabin United	205	100	210	132	80	200	210	Unk.4	200	220	1,557

Note:
Unk.1 Some error of T3 official match report 7 October 2023 (Chachoengsao Hi-Tek 2–3 Pluakdaeng United).
Unk.2 Some error of T3 official match report 28 October 2023 (Navy 0–2 Fleet).
Unk.3 Some error of T3 official match report 25 November 2023 (Marines 0–1 Fleet).
Unk.4 Some error of T3 official match report 3 February 2024 (Saimit Kabin United 2–0 Marines).
Unk.5 Some error of T3 official match report 24 February 2024 (ACDC 0–1 Bankhai United).
