= 2025–26 Thai League 3 Eastern Region =

Thai League 3 Eastern Region
- Season: 2025–26
- Dates: 13 September 2025 – 22 March 2026
- Champions: Fleet
- Relegated: ACDC
- T3 National Championship: Fleet; Burapha United
- Matches: 132
- Goals: 332 (2.52 per match)
- Top goalscorer: (Brazil) Elias Emanuel de Magalhães Souza (14 goals; Burapha United)
- Best goalkeeper: (Thailand) Suphatchai Laothong (8 clean sheets; Fleet) (Thailand) Kantaphat Manpati (8 clean sheets; Customs United)
- Biggest home win: 6 goals difference Burapha United 6–0 Marines (12 October 2025)
- Biggest away win: 7 goals difference ACDC 0–7 Burapha United (22 March 2026)
- Highest scoring: 7 goals ACDC 3–4 Customs United (22 November 2025); Burapha United 6–1 BFB Pattaya City (24 January 2026); Burapha United 6–1 Saimit Kabin United (28 February 2026); ACDC 0–7 Burapha United (22 March 2026)
- Longest winning run: 5 matches Fleet; Burapha United; Navy; Bankhai United
- Longest unbeaten run: 11 matches Fleet
- Longest winless run: 13 matches Marines
- Longest losing run: 6 matches Marines
- Highest attendance: 958; Padriew City 1–0 Chachoengsao Hi-Tek (19 October 2025)
- Lowest attendance: 87; Marines 0–1 Bankhai United (17 January 2026)
- Total attendance: 35,213
- Average attendance: 275

The 2025–26 Thai League 3 Eastern Region was part of the 2025–26 Thai League 3 Regional Stage, consisting of 12 clubs located in the eastern region of Thailand, as well as some from the eastern part of the central region. The season commenced on 13 September 2025, with clubs competing in a round-robin format featuring home-and-away matches. The Regional Stage concluded on 22 March 2026, with the top two clubs advancing to the National Championship Stage, while the bottom-placed club was relegated to the Thailand Semi-pro League for the following season.

== Seasonal Changes ==
The 2025–26 Thai League 3 season features a number of changes compared to the previous campaign. These include the promotion and relegation of clubs between divisions, several club renamings and rebrandings, and the introduction of a new title sponsor, BYD Auto, which rebranded the competition as the BYD Dolphin League III for sponsorship reasons.

=== Promotions from Thailand Semi-pro League ===
Normally, the champions of each of the six regional groups of the 2025 Thailand Semi-pro League would be promoted to the Thai League 3. However, in the Western region, the champions, The Wall, failed club licensing and were denied promotion. As a result, only five regional champions earned direct promotion, with several additional clubs promoted under special quotas due to licensing issues and adjustments to balance the number of teams in each group. Club promotion in the Eastern region:

- Banbueng City – promoted as regional champions, later renamed Burapha United.

=== Clubs relegated due to finishing last in the region ===
Alongside the licensing-related relegations, one club was demoted from the Thai League 3 Eastern region after finishing at the bottom of the respective regional leagues in the 2024–25 season.

- Samut Prakan – relegated as the bottom-placed club in the Eastern region.

=== Sponsorship and Broadcasting ===
In the 2025–26 season, Thai League 3 will operate under a title sponsorship arrangement for the first time: BYD Auto (through BYD Rêver Thailand) has become the main sponsor for all three professional tiers in Thailand, including Thai League 3, rebranding it as the BYD Dolphin League III.

On the broadcasting side, a landmark media rights deal was struck, giving AIS Play (in partnership with Gulf and JAS) exclusive rights to stream all matches from Thai Leagues 1, 2, and 3, plus domestic cups and youth competitions for the 2025–26 through 2028–29 seasons. Under this agreement, Thai League 3 matches can be watched live for free via AIS Play, and fans will no longer rely solely on individual clubs' streaming efforts (e.g., via YouTube or Facebook), as they did in previous seasons.

=== Club name and logo changes ===
2 clubs have rebranded or changed their logos for the 2025–26 season of the Thai League 3 Eastern region:

- Burapha United, formerly known as Banbueng City, changed their name and logo following promotion from the Thailand Semi-pro League to the 2025–26 Thai League 3 Eastern region. The club replaced its previous emblem, which featured a blue buffalo head, with a newly designed crest depicting a cheetah head accompanied by laurel leaves, a football, and the inscription Since 2025.
- Customs United, formerly Toko Customs United, simplified their club identity by dropping the prefix "Toko" from both their name and emblem. The crest now displays only the wording "Customs United", while all other design elements remain the same.

== Teams ==
=== Number of teams by province ===
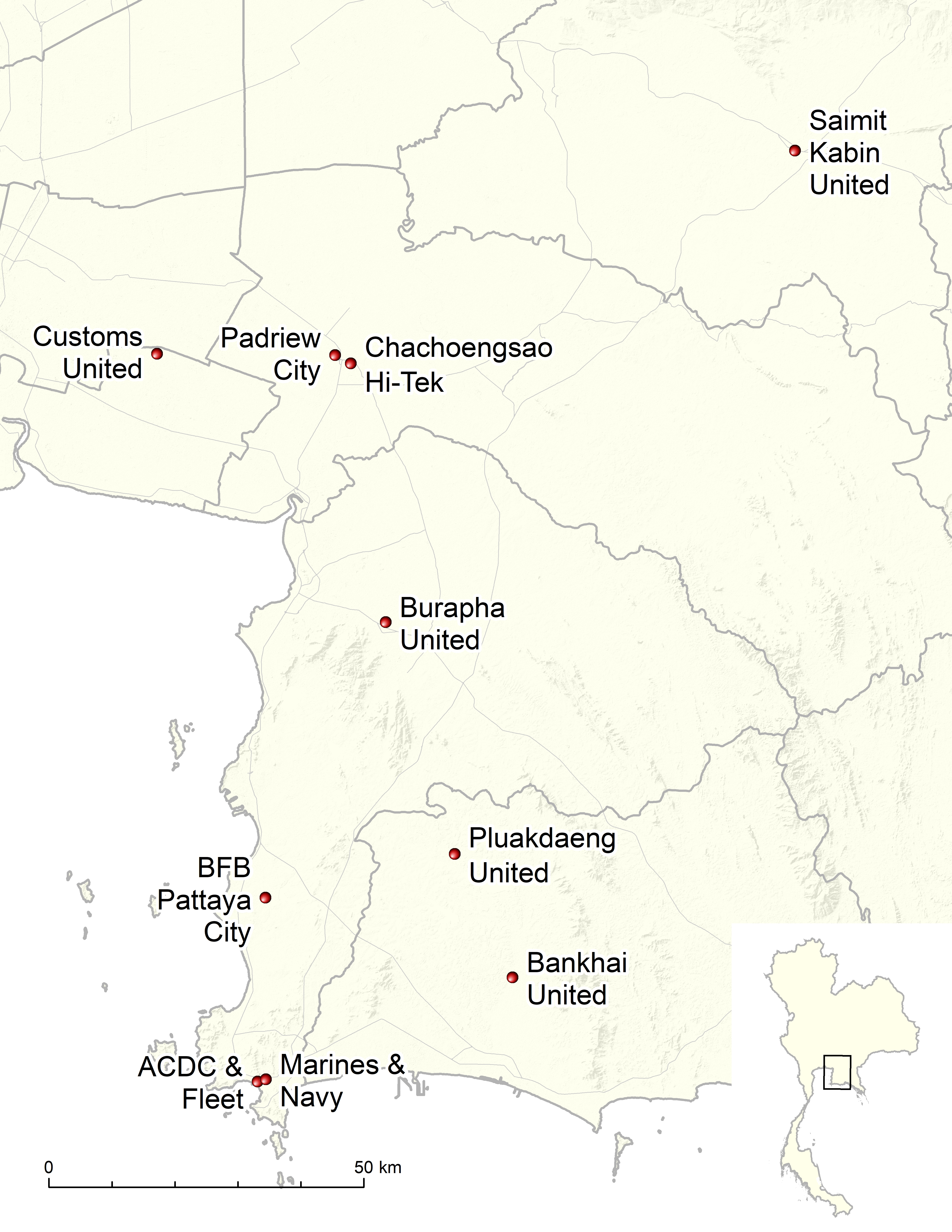
Locations of the 2025–26 Thai League 3 Eastern Region clubs.

Position	Province	Number	Teams
1	Chonburi	6	ACDC, BFB Pattaya City, Burapha United, Fleet, Marines, and Navy
2	Chachoengsao	2	Chachoengsao Hi-Tek and Padriew City
2	Rayong	2	Bankhai United and Pluakdaeng United
4	Prachinburi	1	Saimit Kabin United
4	Samut Prakan	1	Customs United

=== Stadiums and locations ===
Team	Location	Stadium	Coordinates
ACDC	Chonburi (Sattahip)	Battleship Stadium	12°39′38″N 100°55′25″E
Bankhai United	Rayong (Ban Khai)	Wai Krong Stadium	12°48′26″N 101°17′51″E
BFB Pattaya City	Chonburi (Bang Lamung)	Nong Prue Stadium	12°55′28″N 100°56′14″E
Burapha United	Chonburi (Ban Bueng)	Banbueng Town Municipality Stadium	13°19′06″N 101°06′59″E
Chachoengsao Hi-Tek	Chachoengsao (Mueang)	Chachoengsao Town Municipality Stadium	13°41′24″N 101°04′06″E
Customs United	Samut Prakan (Bang Phli)	Stadium of Customs Department, Lad Krabang 54	13°42′22″N 100°47′03″E
Fleet	Chonburi (Sattahip)	Battleship Stadium	12°39′38″N 100°55′25″E
Marines	Chonburi (Sattahip)	Sattahip Navy Stadium	12°39′49″N 100°56′09″E
Navy	Chonburi (Sattahip)	Sattahip Navy Stadium	12°39′49″N 100°56′09″E
Padriew City	Chachoengsao (Mueang)	Chachoengsao Provincial Stadium	13°42′07″N 101°02′44″E
Pluakdaeng United	Rayong (Pluak Daeng)	CK Stadium	12°59′06″N 101°12′52″E
Saimit Kabin United	Prachinburi (Kabin Buri)	Nomklao Maharat Stadium	13°59′20″N 101°43′25″E

=== Foreign players ===
A T3 team could register 3 foreign players from foreign players all around the world. A team can use 3 foreign players on the field in each game.

Note :
(substituted off) : players who released during second leg transfer window;
(substituted on) : players who registered during second leg transfer window.

AFC member countries players.
CAF member countries players.
CONCACAF member countries players.
CONMEBOL member countries players.
OFC member countries players.
UEFA member countries players.
No foreign player registered.

Club	Leg	Player 1	Player 2	Player 3
ACDC	1st	(Japan) Ken Hagihara (substituted off)	(Nigeria) Ifeoluwa David Bamigboye	(Nigeria) Jerry Ichako Akose
ACDC	2nd	(Nigeria) Ugonna Brian Maduagwu (substituted on)	(Nigeria) Ifeoluwa David Bamigboye	(Nigeria) Jerry Ichako Akose
Bankhai United	1st	(Brazil) Francisco Jadson Silva do Nascimento (substituted off)	(Brazil) Guttiner (substituted off)	(Ghana) Bernard Owusu Mintah
Bankhai United	2nd	(Brazil) John Caio Camargo Silva (substituted on)	(Egypt) Ahmed Saad Lotfy Elnoamany (substituted on)	(Ghana) Bernard Owusu Mintah
BFB Pattaya City	1st	(Iran) Abdolreza Zarei (substituted off)	(South Korea) Lee Jun-u (substituted off)	(South Korea) Kim Jin-hyeong
BFB Pattaya City	2nd	(American Samoa) Adewumi Nicoholas Aladetimi Jr (substituted on)	(South Korea) Yu Seon-jin (substituted on)	(South Korea) Kim Jin-hyeong
Burapha United	1st	(Nigeria) Chinonso Kingsley Thomas (substituted off)	(Ghana) Kwame Karikari (substituted off)	(Japan) Kazuki Murakami
Burapha United	2nd	(Brazil) Elias Emanuel de Magalhães Souza (substituted on)	(Brazil) Matheus Souza (substituted on)	(Japan) Kazuki Murakami
Chachoengsao Hi-Tek	1st	(France) Shayn Djelloul Chekalil (substituted off)	(Cameroon) Nyamsi Jacques Dominique	(Japan) Hideto Ozaki
Chachoengsao Hi-Tek	2nd	(Australia) Riki Graham Sheather (substituted on)	(Cameroon) Nyamsi Jacques Dominique	(Japan) Hideto Ozaki
Customs United	1st	(Japan) Tatsuya Tanaka (substituted off)	(Japan) Hiroto Tokuichi (substituted off)	(Japan) Naoki Uemoto
Customs United	2nd		(Japan) Masaki Ueno (substituted on)	(Japan) Naoki Uemoto
Fleet	1st	(Brazil) Lucas Daubermann	(Brazil) Rafael Galhardo	(Brazil) Tiago Chulapa
Fleet	2nd	(Brazil) Lucas Daubermann	(Brazil) Rafael Galhardo	(Brazil) Tiago Chulapa
Marines	1st	(Ghana) Prince Sarfo Adu (substituted off)	(Laos) Thipphachanh Inthavong (substituted off)	(Ghana) Isaac Aboagye
Marines	2nd	(Argentina) Thomas Maximo Altamirano (substituted on)	(Japan) Takuto Hirao (substituted on)	(Ghana) Isaac Aboagye
Navy	1st	(Brazil) Yuri Martins Rocha (substituted off)	(South Korea) Jeon San-hae (substituted off)	(Brazil) André Luís
Navy	2nd	(Brazil) Jeferson de Sousa Ferreira (substituted on)	(South Korea) Yoo Byung-soo (substituted on)	(Brazil) André Luís
Padriew City	1st		(Nigeria) Jeremiah Kegbe	(South Korea) Um Dabin
Padriew City	2nd	(Brazil) Vinícius Silva Freitas (substituted on)	(Nigeria) Jeremiah Kegbe	(South Korea) Um Dabin
Pluakdaeng United	1st	(Nigeria) Donatus Ehiemere (substituted off)	(Iran) Hamzeh Sari (substituted off)	(South Korea) Lee Geon-woo
Pluakdaeng United	2nd	(Zimbabwe) Tanaka Misheck Makaripe (substituted on)	(South Korea) Lee Jae-seung (substituted on)	(South Korea) Lee Geon-woo
Saimit Kabin United	1st		(Brazil) Marcelo de Souza Silva	(South Korea) Jung Seung-min
Saimit Kabin United	2nd	(Brazil) Gustavo (substituted on)	(Brazil) Marcelo de Souza Silva	(South Korea) Jung Seung-min

== League table ==
=== Standings ===
Pos	Team	Pld	W	D	L	GF	GA	GD	Pts	Qualification or relegation
1	Fleet (C, Q)	22	15	4	3	36	15	+21	49 (Note: Fleet ahead on head-to-head points record; Fleet 6 pts, Burapha United 0 pts.)	Qualification to the National Championship stage
2	Burapha United (Q)	22	15	4	3	60	18	+42	49	Qualification to the National Championship stage
3	Navy	22	11	7	4	32	17	+15	40	
4	Customs United	22	10	5	7	34	26	+8	35 (Note: The head-to-head record is tied; Customs United 3 pts (GD 0, GF 2), Bankhai United 3 pts (GD 0, GF 2). Customs United is ahead in the overall goals difference.)	
5	Bankhai United	22	10	5	7	27	25	+2	35	
6	Saimit Kabin United	22	9	6	7	24	26	−2	33	
7	BFB Pattaya City	22	7	7	8	29	40	−11	28	
8	Pluakdaeng United	22	6	7	9	26	33	−7	25	
9	Chachoengsao Hi-Tek	22	3	10	9	13	20	−7	19	
10	Marines	22	4	6	12	16	36	−20	18	
11	Padriew City	22	4	5	13	14	30	−16	17	
12	ACDC (R)	22	3	4	15	21	46	−25	13	Relegation to the Thailand Semi-pro League

Source: Thai League
Rules for classification: 1) Points; 2) Head-to-head points; 3) Head-to-head goal difference; 4) Head-to-head goal scored; 5) Overall goal difference; 6) Overall goal scored; 7) Fair play points; 8) Play-off without extra time).
(C) Champions; (Q) Qualified for the phase indicated; (R) Relegated

=== Positions by round ===
Team ╲ Round	1	2	3	4	5	6	7	8	9	10	11	12	13	14	15	16	17	18	19	20	21	22
Fleet	6	5	6	7	7	6	5	3	3	1	4	2	1	3	2	2	1	2	2	2	2	1
Burapha United	1	1	1	1	1	1	1	1	1	2	1	3	2	1	1	1	2	1	1	1	1	2
Navy	2	3	5	6	5	3	3	2	2	3	2	4	5	5	5	4	3	3	3	3	3	3
Customs United	7	2	3	2	2	2	2	4	4	4	3	1	3	4	4	5	5	6	5	6	5	4
Bankhai United	3	4	2	4	3	4	4	5	7	5	5	5	4	2	3	3	4	5	6	4	4	5
Saimit Kabin United	11	10	8	11	6	7	9	8	5	8	7	7	7	6	6	6	6	4	4	5	6	6
BFB Pattaya City	5	11	7	9	9	9	7	6	8	6	6	6	6	7	7	7	7	7	7	7	7	7
Pluakdaeng United	4	6	4	3	4	5	6	7	6	7	8	8	8	8	8	8	8	8	8	8	8	8
Chachoengsao Hi-Tek	9	7	10	12	12	12	12	12	11	11	11	11	10	10	10	9	9	9	9	9	9	9
Marines	10	8	11	8	11	11	11	11	12	12	12	12	12	12	12	12	12	12	11	11	10	10
Padriew City	8	9	12	10	10	8	10	9	9	9	9	9	9	9	9	10	10	10	10	10	11	11
ACDC	12	12	9	5	8	10	8	10	10	10	10	10	11	11	11	11	11	11	12	12	12	12

Source: Thai League
= Qualification to the National Championship stage; = Relegation to the Thailand Semi-pro League

=== Results by round ===
Team ╲ Round	1	2	3	4	5	6	7	8	9	10	11	12	13	14	15	16	17	18	19	20	21	22
Fleet	D	W	L	L	D	W	W	W	W	W	L	W	W	D	W	W	W	D	W	W	W	W
Burapha United	W	D	W	W	W	W	L	D	L	D	W	D	W	W	W	W	L	W	W	W	W	W
Navy	W	D	L	L	W	W	W	D	W	D	W	D	L	D	D	W	W	W	W	W	L	D
Customs United	D	W	W	W	D	L	W	L	W	D	W	W	L	L	W	L	D	L	D	L	W	W
Bankhai United	W	D	W	L	W	L	D	D	L	W	W	W	W	W	D	L	D	L	L	W	W	L
Saimit Kabin United	L	D	D	D	W	D	L	W	W	L	D	D	W	W	W	W	L	W	L	L	L	W
BFB Pattaya City	D	L	W	L	L	D	W	W	D	W	W	L	W	L	D	L	W	L	D	D	D	L
Pluakdaeng United	W	D	W	D	D	L	D	L	W	D	L	L	D	L	L	W	L	L	D	W	L	W
Chachoengsao Hi-Tek	L	D	L	L	D	L	D	L	W	D	L	D	D	W	L	W	D	D	L	L	D	D
Marines	L	D	L	W	L	L	L	L	L	L	D	D	L	D	L	L	D	W	W	D	W	L
Padriew City	D	L	L	W	L	W	L	W	D	D	L	L	L	D	L	L	W	L	D	L	L	L
ACDC	L	D	D	W	L	W	L	L	L	L	L	D	L	L	D	L	L	W	L	L	L	L

Source: Thai League
W = Won; D = Drawn; L = Lost

=== Results ===
Home \ Away	ACD	BKI	BPC	BPU	CCH	CTU	FLT	MRE	NVY	PRC	PDU	SKB
ACDC	—	1–3	3–1	0–7	2–1	3–4	1–2	0–0	2–2	1–0	0–1	1–2
Bankhai United	1–0	—	3–2	1–1	1–1	2–1	1–2	2–0	1–2	2–1	1–0	2–1
BFB Pattaya City	2–1	0–0	—	2–4	2–1	0–2	0–4	2–2	2–1	0–0	2–1	2–2
Burapha United	2–0	1–0	6–1	—	0–0	3–2	0–1	6–0	1–1	4–1	3–1	6–1
Chachoengsao Hi-Tek	1–0	2–2	1–1	0–2	—	0–0	0–0	1–0	2–3	1–0	0–1	1–1
Customs United	3–2	1–0	2–0	0–4	1–0	—	0–1	1–1	1–1	1–1	3–3	1–2
Fleet	5–1	3–0	2–2	2–0	1–0	1–2	—	1–1	2–1	1–0	2–2	1–0
Marines	1–1	0–1	1–3	1–4	1–0	0–1	1–0	—	0–1	1–0	1–2	2–1
Navy	4–0	3–1	1–2	1–1	0–0	1–0	2–0	3–0	—	1–1	0–0	1–0
Padriew City	1–0	0–1	2–2	0–2	1–0	0–5	0–1	2–0	1–0	—	0–0	1–2
Pluakdaeng United	3–2	1–1	0–1	2–3	1–1	0–3	1–3	2–1	0–2	3–1	—	2–2
Saimit Kabin United	0–0	2–1	1–0	1–0	0–0	1–0	0–1	2–2	0–1	2–1	1–0	—

Source: Thai League
Legend: Blue = home team win; Yellow = draw; Red = away team win.
For upcoming matches, an "a" indicates there is an article about the rivalry between the two participants.
