= Bankhai United F.C. =

Thai football club

Bankhai United บ้านค่าย ยูไนเต็ด
- Full name: Bankhai United Football Club บ้านค่าย ยูไนเต็ด
- Nicknames: Taksin Warlord (ขุนศึกพระเจ้าตากสิน)
- Founded: 2012; 14 years ago
- Dissolved: 2026
- Ground: Wai Krong Stadium; Rayong, Thailand
- Capacity: 1,362
- Chairman: Chatchon Khamon
- Head coach: Yai Nilwong
- League: Thai League 3
- 2025–26: Thai League 3, 5th of 12 in the Eastern region

Bankhai United Football Club (Thai: บ้านค่าย ยูไนเต็ด) is a Thai football club based in Ban Khai district, Rayong province.

== History ==
Bankhai United was founded in 2012, they are the local football team of Ban Khai district, Rayong province. In January 2012 they purchased the playing license of Khǒr Royal Cup from Bantungked School F.C.

On 9 January 2012 they played first ever match with Sports Association of Rayong Province F.C. in Khǒr Royal Cup 2011 season and win 4–1. In their first season they qualified to the semi-final before defeated to Krung Thonburi F.C. 3–2.

In Khǒr Royal Cup 2012 season they were in round of 16 and defeated to Rayong Province in penalty shoot-out. In 2013 season they qualified to the semi-final again and draw with Rajapruek University F.C. 2–2 but defeated in penalty shoot -out.

In 2014 they defeated in round of 16 to Army Welfare Department F.C. 1–2 and fall in the first round of 2015 season

In 2022, Bankhai United competed in the Thai League 3 for the 2022–23 season. It is their 6th season in the professional league. The club started the season with a 1–0 home win over Assawin Kohkwang United and they ended the season with a 1–0 away win over Assawin Kohkwang United. The club has finished 8th place in the league of the Eastern region. In addition, in the 2022–23 Thai League Cup Bankhai United was defeated 0–1 by Rajpracha in the qualification play-off round, causing them to be eliminated.

== Player records ==
- First player to score a goal
  - Withan Kajorn-Gridikul : 4–1 win v Sports Association of Rayong Province, 9 January 2012 in Khǒr Royal Cup
- First player to score a league goal
  - Patcharadanai Lumsun : 2–0 win v Saimitr Kabin United F.C., 18 February 2017 in Thai League 4
- Most goals scored in one game
  - 3 by Panukorn Prapa : 9–1 win v Takhian Tia, 18 December 2016 in Thai Football Amateur Tournament
- Most goals scored in one football league game
  - 2 by Patcharadanai Lumsun : 2–0 win v Saimitr Kabin United F.C., 18 February 2017 in Thai League 4

== Stadium and locations ==
Coordinates	Location	Stadium	Capacity	Year
12°48′26″N 101°17′52″E	Rayong	Wai Krong Stadium	1,362	2017

== Record ==
Season	League									FA Cup	League Cup	T3 Cup	Top goalscorer	
Season	Division	P	W	D	L	F	A	Pts	Pos	FA Cup	League Cup	T3 Cup	Name	Goals
2016	DIV 3 East	6	3	2	1	15	5	11	1st	Opted out	Ineligible		(Thailand) Panukorn Prapa	5
2017	T4 East	27	9	8	10	45	42	35	6th	Opted out	Opted out		(Thailand) Pacharadanai Lamsan	8
2018	T4 East	27	13	10	4	34	18	49	1st	R3	QR1			
2019	T4 East	28	19	6	3	60	19	63	1st	R3	QR1		(Thailand) Tatree Seeha	14
2020–21	T3 East	16	10	1	5	33	16	31	3rd	R1	QR1		(Republic of the Congo) Burnel Okana-Stazi	18
2021–22	T3 East	22	10	9	3	37	22	39	4th	Opted out	QR2		(Thailand) Anuwat Nakkasem	15
2022–23	T3 East	22	5	10	7	20	26	25	8th	Opted out	QRP		(Brazil) Abner Gomes Faria	4
2023–24	T3 East	20	13	3	4	30	14	42	2nd	Opted out	R1	R2	(Republic of the Congo) Burnel Okana-Stazi	10
2024–25	T3 East	22	9	9	4	31	16	36	3rd	R1	QR2	LP	(Brazil) Erivelto	8
2025–26	T3 East	22	10	5	7	27	25	35	5th	R2	R1	LP	(Thailand) Anucha Phantong	9

Champions	Runners-up	Promoted	Relegated

== Players ==
=== Current squad ===
As of 20 September 2024

Note: Flags indicate national team as defined under FIFA eligibility rules; some limited exceptions apply. Players may hold more than one non-FIFA nationality.

No.	Pos.	Nation	Player
1	GK	THA	Polnaruet Sudta
2	DF	THA	Pongsiri Sookrod
4	DF	THA	Noppanan Thipaksorn
5	MF	THA	Parintorn Trakarnchan
7	FW	BRA	Lucas Massaro
8	MF	THA	Saharat Rattanawijit
9	FW	BRA	Guttiner
10	MF	THA	Natthikorn Yaprom
13	MF	THA	Chinnapat Kaikaew
14	MF	THA	Pummared Kladkleeb
15	DF	BRA	Lucas Daubermann
17	FW	THA	Apichat Sarai
19	FW	NGR	John Owoeri
20	DF	THA	Tawan Huntumlay

No.	Pos.	Nation	Player
26	MF	THA	Nantawat Seeda
27	MF	THA	Sattra Ratlongmaung
30	GK	THA	Prapat Yoskrai
31	DF	THA	Thammawat Trailum
36	GK	THA	Natthawut Tharapon
38	FW	THA	Anucha Phatong
45	MF	THA	Theerakorn Sunthonwat
47	MF	THA	Jirayu Kambang
53	MF	THA	Kanphitcha Chaisue
55	FW	THA	Aphirak Suankan
58	MF	THA	Jakkapong Pholjuang
65	MF	THA	Panuwit Silapong
96	MF	THA	Punnapob Namanu
9	MF	THA	Apirat Heemkhao

== Coaching staff ==
Position	Staff
Chairman	(Thailand) Chana Pitutecha
Team Manager	(Thailand) Wut Aimsaeng
Head Coach	(Thailand) Yai Nilwong
Assistant Coach	(Thailand) Saifon Kasemsang (Norway) (Thailand) Nopphorn Ekasatra

== Honours ==
=== Domestic leagues ===
- Thai League 4 Eastern Region
  - Winners (2): 2018, 2019
- Football Division 3
  - Winners (1): 2016
