= BFB Pattaya City F.C. =

BFB Pattaya City บีเอฟบี พัทยา ซิตี้
- Full name: BFB Pattaya City Football Club
- Nicknames: The killer dolphins (โลมาเพชฌฆาต)
- Founded: 2021; 5 years ago (as Banfootball Pattaya Football Club); 2023; 3 years ago (as BFB Pattaya City Football Club)
- Ground: Nong Prue Stadium; Chonburi, Thailand
- Capacity: 5,838
- Coordinates: 12°55′28″N 100°56′14″E
- Owner(s): Ban Football Co., Ltd.
- Chairman: Jirayut Maneekhot
- Head coach: Surachat Singhong
- League: Thai League 3
- 2025–26: Thai League 3, 7th of 12 in the Eastern region
- Website: https://web.facebook.com/profile.php?id=100089775492188

BFB Pattaya City Football Club (Thai สโมสรฟุตบอล บีเอฟบี พัทยา ซิตี้), is a Thai football club based in Si Racha, Chonburi, Thailand. The club is currently playing in the Thai League 3 Eastern region.

== History ==
Banfootball Pattaya Football Club established in 2022. The club participation in the competition Thailand Amateur League (Eastern Region).

In early 2023, the club competed in Thailand Semi-Pro League Eastern region finished in 2nd place of the region, promoted to the Thai League 3.

In 2023-24, The Club has changed renamed the club name to BFB Pattaya City Football Club. and competed in Thai League 3 Eastern Region. It is their 1st season in the professional league. The club has finished 8th place in the league of the Eastern Region.

== Stadium and locations ==
Coordinates	Location	Stadium	Capacity	Year
13°10′20″N 100°55′41″E	Si Racha, Chonburi	Si Racha Municipal Stadium	5,000	2022 – present

== Season by season record ==
Season	League									FA Cup	League Cup	T3 Cup	Top goalscorer	
Season	Division	P	W	D	L	F	A	Pts	Pos	FA Cup	League Cup	T3 Cup	Name	Goals
2022	TA East	3	3	0	0	17	2	9	1st	Opted out	In eligible		(Thailand) Phadet Kaewmanee	6
2023	TS East	6	4	1	1	10	4	13	2nd	Opted out	Ineligible		(Thailand) Achirawat Saimee (Thailand) Kanok Tapsai (Thailand) Thammathon Narikham	2
2023–24	T3 East	20	6	6	8	23	28	24	8th	R1	QR2	QR2	(Thailand) Achirawat Saimee	9
2024–25	T3 East	22	7	4	11	26	36	25	9th	QR	QR1	LP	(Thailand) Achirawat Saimee	5
2025–26	T3 East	22	7	7	8	29	40	28	7th	R2	QR1	LP	(Iran) Abdolreza Zarei	7

Champions	Runners-up	Promoted	Relegated

- P = Played
- W = Games won
- D = Games drawn
- L = Games lost
- F = Goals for
- A = Goals against
- Pts = Points
- Pos = Final position
- QR1 = First Qualifying Round
- QR2 = Second Qualifying Round
- R1 = Round 1
- R2 = Round 2
- R3 = Round 3
- R4 = Round 4
- R5 = Round 5
- R6 = Round 6
- QF = Quarter-finals
- SF = Semi-finals
- RU = Runners-up
- W = Winners

== Players ==
=== Current squad ===
As of 3 October 2026

Note: Flags indicate national team as defined under FIFA eligibility rules; some limited exceptions apply. Players may hold more than one non-FIFA nationality.

No.	Pos.	Nation	Player
1	GK	THA	Kandanai kingmahasombat
2	DF	THA	Manoon Suttilor
3	DF	THA	Yodrak Namuangrak
4	DF	THA	Teerapat Salaiwong
6	MF	THA	Nattapong Karuna
5	DR	THA	Pitipong Madee
6	MF	THA	Nattapong Karuna
7	FW	THA	Pawit Koedphon
8	DF	THA	Kanokpoommisak Waingsonsirikul
9	FW	THA	Thammathon Narikham
10	MF	GHA	Kharim Abdul Ayeh
11	FW	ASA	Adewumi Nicoholas Aladetimi
13	DF	THA	Athibodee Arsapanom
14	MF	THA	Pornsak Pongthong
15	MF	THA	Baramee Dangtadthong

No.	Pos.	Nation	Player
16	DF	THA	Prachak Chatumma
17	DF	THA	Aekkarat Maneekhot
18	FW	THA	Mekmongkhon Bunmi
19	MF	THA	Techit Seepeepram
20	MF	THA	Chitipat Kaeoyos
23	MF	THA	Kanok Tapsai
24	GK	THA	Naronsak Srirung
25	FW	THA	Sudsakorn Sor Klinmee
26	GK	THA	Poramet Siri
28	FW	THA	Phadungkiad Koedphon
30	DF	THA	Annop Posri
49	FW	THA	Aphiwit Sunthonvipat
66	DF	THA	Theerapat Theerachotsakun
69	DF	THA	Nontawat Udomsukyawon
98	FW	BRA	Marcelo de Sousa Silva
