= Padriew City F.C. =

Padriew City แปดริ้ว ซิตี้
- Full name: Padriew City Football Club
- Nicknames: The Graceful Paddy Roosters (ไก่นาจอมพริ้ว)
- Founded: 2021; 5 years ago
- Ground: Chachoengsao Provincial Stadium; Chachoengsao, Thailand
- Capacity: 2,000
- Coordinates: 13°42′07″N 101°02′44″E
- Owner(s): Padriew City Co., Ltd.
- Chairman: Kittiphat Paopiamsap
- Head coach: Atthaphong Suriyachan
- League: Thai League 3
- 2025–26: Thai League 3, 11th of 12 in the Eastern region
- Website: https://www.facebook.com/people/แปดริ้ว-City/100077960386616/

Padriew City Football Club (Thai สโมสรฟุตบอล แปดริ้ว ซิตี้), is a Thai football club based in Mueang, Chachoengsao, Thailand. The club is currently playing in the Thai League 3 Eastern region.

== History ==
Padriew City was founded in 2021 by local football enthusiasts and businesspeople in Chachoengsao. The club initially competed in amateur-level leagues before joining the Thailand Semi-pro League.

In the 2024 season, they finished first in the Eastern Region of the Semi-pro League, earning promotion to the Thai League 3 for the 2024–25 season. They finished 8th out of 12 in their debut season in the T3 Eastern Region.

== Stadium and locations ==
The club plays its home games at Chachoengsao Provincial Stadium, with a capacity of approximately 2,000.

Coordinates	Location	Stadium	Year
13°42′07″N 101°02′44″E	Mueang, Chachoengsao	Chachoengsao Provincial Stadium	2024 – present

== Season by season record ==
Season	League									FA Cup	League Cup	T3 Cup	Top goalscorer	
Season	Division	P	W	D	L	F	A	Pts	Pos	FA Cup	League Cup	T3 Cup	Name	Goals
2024	TS East	7	5	2	0	14	7	17	1st	Opted out	Ineligible		(Thailand) Jirayut Saenpha	5
2024–25	T3 East	22	7	5	10	26	30	26	8th	R1	QRP	LP	(Thailand) Weerachai Paencokesung, (Thailand) Atip Wattana	5
2025–26	T3 East	22	4	5	13	14	30	17	11th	QR	QRP	LP	(Nigeria) Jeremiah Kegbe	6

Champions	Runners-up	Promoted	Relegated

- P = Played
- W = Games won
- D = Games drawn
- L = Games lost
- F = Goals for
- A = Goals against
- Pts = Points
- Pos = Final position
- QR1 = First Qualifying Round
- QR2 = Second Qualifying Round
- R1 = Round 1
- R2 = Round 2
- R3 = Round 3
- R4 = Round 4
- R5 = Round 5
- R6 = Round 6
- QF = Quarter-finals
- SF = Semi-finals
- RU = Runners-up
- W = Winners

== Players ==
=== Current squad ===
As of 20 September 2024

Note: Flags indicate national team as defined under FIFA eligibility rules; some limited exceptions apply. Players may hold more than one non-FIFA nationality.

No.	Pos.	Nation	Player
2	DF	THA	Weerachai Paencokesung
3	DF	THA	Khamron Phanchaem
4	MF	THA	Tiwa Sangsomboon
5	MF	THA	Phanupong Aemphiphat
6	MF	THA	Kiattisak Srikum
7	FW	THA	Natapon Srisawat
9	MF	THA	Aphiwat Charoenlai
10	MF	THA	Atip Wattana
11	DF	THA	Jeera Laohachinda
12	MF	THA	Phuriphat Kopak
14	MF	THA	Korrakoch Pungpibul
15	MF	THA	Kiattisak Chomchoed
16	DF	THA	Eakachi Saengprasert
18	GK	THA	Kritwara Poonpokphol

No.	Pos.	Nation	Player
19	FW	THA	Korakot Hotammarat
29	FW	NGA	Jeremiah Kegbe
31	DF	THA	Nakarin Madbhmrung
33	DF	THA	Woraphol Phona
34	MF	THA	Patsawee Oopachai
36	GK	THA	Keerati Yoosuk
37	MF	THA	Patiroop Sunjonlord
38	GK	THA	Nattawoot Saengdara
39	DF	THA	Kongpon Ployprapai
40	MF	THA	Athiwat Poolsawat
44	FW	THA	Jirayut Saenpha
47	FW	THA	Sarayut Pongphaew
66	MF	KOR	Kim Min-kap
99	FW	KOR	Lee Gi-been

== Coaching staff ==
Position	Staff
Club Director	(Thailand) Ek Wongnim
Head Coach	(Thailand) Atthaphong Suriyachan
Assistant Coach	(Thailand) Thanakorn Phadsri
Goalkeeper Coach	
Fitness Coach	
Analysis	
Doctor	
Physiotherapist	
Masseur	

== Honours ==
=== Domestic competitions ===
- Thailand Semi-pro League Eastern Region
  - Winners (1) : 2024
