= Jaturong Pimkoon =

Thai footballer (born 1993)

Personal information
- Full name: Jaturong Pimkoon
- Date of birth: 3 September 1993 (age 33)
- Place of birth: Prachinburi, Thailand
- Height: 1.76 m (5 ft 9 1/2 in)
- Position: Forward

Team information
- Current team: Prachinburi City
- Number: 9

Youth career
- 2007–2010: BEC Tero Sasana

Senior career*
| Years | Team | Apps | (Gls) |
| 2011–2021 | Police Tero | 106 | (10) |
| 2011–2012 | → Bangkok (loan) | 3 | (0) |
| 2012 | → RBAC (loan) | 18 | (11) |
| 2013 | → Bangkok (loan) | 9 | (7) |
| 2021–2022 | Saimit Kabin United | 29 | (7) |
| 2023 | Chainat Hornbill | 11 | (0) |
| 2023– | Prachinburi City | 9 | (1) |

International career
| 2011–2012 | Thailand U19 | 8 | (4) |
| 2014–2016 | Thailand U23 | 5 | (2) |
- * Club domestic league appearances and goals as of 30 April 2023

Jaturong Pimkoon (Thai: จาตุรงค์ พิมพ์คูณ) is a Thai professional footballer who plays as a forward for Thai League 3 club Prachinburi City.

== International career ==
Jaturong won the AFF U-19 Youth Championship with Thailand U19, and played in 2012 AFC U-19 Championship.

== International goals ==
=== Under-19 ===
| # | Date | Venue | Opponent | Score | Result | Competition |
|---|---|---|---|---|---|---|
| 1. | 13 September 2011 | Thuwunna Stadium, Yangon, Myanmar | Cambodia | 1–0 | 5–0 | 2011 AFF U-19 Youth Championship |
| 2. | 15 September 2011 | Bogyoke Aung San Stadium, Yangon, Myanmar | Philippines | 3–0 | 5–0 | 2011 AFF U-19 Youth Championship |

=== Under-23 ===
| # | Date | Venue | Opponent | Score | Result | Competition |
|---|---|---|---|---|---|---|
| 1. | January 3, 2015 | Dhaka, Bangladesh | Bahrain | 3–0 | 3–0 | 2015 Bangabandhu Cup |
| 2. | March 22, 2015 | Bangkok, Thailand | Vietnam | 1–0 | 3–1 | Friendly match |

== Honours ==
=== Club ===
BEC Tero Sasana

- Thai League Cup: 2014
- Toyota Premier Cup: 2015

=== International ===
Thailand U-19

- AFF U-19 Youth Championship: 2011
