= Marines F.C. (Thailand) =

Thai football club

Marines นาวิกโยธิน
- Full name: Marines Football Club สโมสรฟุตบอลนาวิกโยธิน
- Nickname: Marine Strong
- Founded: 2011; 15 years ago
- Ground: Sattahip Navy Stadium; Sattahip, Chonburi Province
- Capacity: 6,000
- Chairman: Thanakarn Kraikruan
- Manager: Nakin Thammasuwan
- League: Thai League 3
- 2025–26: Thai League 3, 10th of 12 (Eastern region)
| Home colours | Away colours |

Marines Football Club (Thai สโมสรฟุตบอลนาวิกโยธิน) is a Thai football club based in Chonburi Province. The club currently plays in the Thai League 3 Eastern region.

== History ==
Marines won the Khǒr Royal Cup (ถ้วย ข) in the 2006 and 2009 season. They competed in the Thailand League Division 1 under the name Thai Marine Regiment.

=== Maptaphut Marines Rayong ===
In 2010, the club cooperate Map Ta Phut competed in the Regional League Division 2.

=== Eureka Marines ===
In 2016, Marines moved to use stadium at Klaeng, Rayong, and renamed to Eureka Marine Football Club. They competed in Regional League Division 2 Eastern Region.

=== Mariners ===
In 2022, they renamed to Marines Football Club and competed in the Thai League 3. The club has finished 5th in the Eastern region. In addition, in the 2022–23 Thai League Cup Marines were defeated 0–2 by Bankhai United in the second qualification round.

== Stadiums and locations ==
| Coordinates | Location | Stadium | Capacity | Year |
|---|---|---|---|---|
| 12°39′50″N 100°56′09″E | Sattahip, Chonburi | Sattahip Navy Stadium | 12,500 | 2007 |
| 12°40′15″N 100°51′48″E | Sattahip, Chonburi | Communication Battalion Football Field (Royal Thai Marine Corps) | | 2008 |
| 12°45′11″N 101°10′42″E | Rayong | Maptaphut Municipality Stadium (Neonphayom Stadium) | | 2011–2015 |
| 12°47′46″N 101°39′29″E | Rayong | Klaeng Municipality Stadium | | 2016– |

== Season by season record ==
| Season | League | | | | | | | | | FA Cup | League Cup | T3 Cup | Top goalscorer | |
| Season | Division | P | W | D | L | F | A | Pts | Pos | FA Cup | League Cup | T3 Cup | Name | Goals |
|---|---|---|---|---|---|---|---|---|---|---|---|---|---|---|
| 2011 | Bangkok | 30 | 7 | 13 | 10 | 29 | 32 | 34 | 11th | Opted out | Opted out | | | |
| 2012 | Central-East | 34 | 13 | 6 | 15 | 48 | 45 | 45 | 9th | Opted out | Opted out | | | |
| 2013 | Central-East | 26 | 9 | 10 | 7 | 32 | 26 | 37 | 8th | Opted out | Opted out | | | |
| 2014 | Central-East | 26 | 15 | 6 | 5 | 52 | 36 | 51 | 2nd | Opted out | Opted out | | | |
| 2015 | Central-East | 26 | 7 | 9 | 10 | 28 | 34 | 30 | 9th | Opted out | QR2 | | | |
| 2016 | East | 22 | 7 | 5 | 10 | 22 | 28 | 26 | 9th | Opted out | QR2 | | | |
| 2017 | T4 East | 27 | 13 | 9 | 5 | 42 | 28 | 48 | 2nd | R1 | QRP | | (Cameroon) Lionel Frank | 8 |
| 2018 | T3 Upper | 26 | 4 | 11 | 11 | 29 | 42 | 23 | 13th | Opted out | QR1 | | (Thailand) Pakkaphon Kanlapakdee | 8 |
| 2019 | T3 Upper | 24 | 4 | 5 | 15 | 17 | 40 | 17 | 13th | Opted out | QR1 | | (Thailand) Wuttichai Asusheewa | 4 |
| 2020–21 | T3 East | 17 | 7 | 3 | 7 | 21 | 22 | 24 | 6th | R1 | Opted out | | (Thailand) Sorravit Saisom | 6 |
| 2021–22 | T3 East | 22 | 4 | 3 | 15 | 12 | 36 | 15 | 11th | R1 | QRP | | (Thailand) Chonlapat Singruang | 2 |
| 2022–23 | T3 East | 22 | 8 | 6 | 8 | 31 | 31 | 30 | 5th | Opted out | QR2 | | (Thailand) Nattakarn Kaewkong | 8 |
| 2023–24 | T3 East | 20 | 5 | 8 | 7 | 17 | 32 | 23 | 9th | R1 | QR1 | QR2 | (Thailand) Chonlapat Singruang, (Thailand) Worachet Prapaipak, (Thailand) Nuttawut Onin | 3 |
| 2024–25 | T3 East | 22 | 5 | 5 | 12 | 26 | 43 | 20 | 10th | Opted out | QRP | LP | (Thailand) Chonlapat Singruang | 5 |
| 2025–26 | T3 East | 22 | 4 | 6 | 12 | 16 | 36 | 18 | 10th | R1 | QR2 | Opted out | (Thailand) Thanyapat Thanawut | 5 |

| Champions | Runners-up | Promoted | Relegated |

== Honours ==
- Thai League 4 Eastern Region
  - Runners-up (1): 2017
- Regional League Central-East Division
  - Runners-up (1): 2014
- Khǒr Royal Cup
  - Winners (2): 2006, 2009
