= Chachoengsao (disambiguation) =

Chachoengsao may refer to these places in Thailand:

- the town Chachoengsao
- Chachoengsao Province
- Mueang Chachoengsao district
