= Fleet F.C. (Thailand) =

Fleet กองเรือรบ
- Full name: Fleet Football Club
- Nicknames: The warship warriors (นักรบทางเรือ)
- Founded: 2022; 4 years ago
- Ground: Battleship Stadium; Chonburi, Thailand
- Capacity: 2,000
- Coordinates: 12°39′39″N 100°55′24″E
- Owner(s): Kong Rueaprachanban Co., Ltd
- Chairman: Nawin Thananet
- Head coach: Wiriya Phaophan
- League: Thai League 3
- 2025–26: Thai League 3, 1st of 12 in the Eastern region
- Website: https://web.facebook.com/profile.php?id=100043256215829&_rdc=1&_rdr

Fleet Football Club (Thai สโมสรฟุตบอลกองเรือรบ), is a Thai football club under the stewardship of Royal Thai Navy based in Sattahip, Chonburi, Thailand. The club is currently playing in the Thai League 3 Eastern region.

== History ==
In early 2022, the club was established and competed in Thailand Amateur League Eastern region, using the Battleship Stadium as the ground and their head coach is Wiriya Phaophan. The club's badge use a frigate that is the HTMS Makut Rajakumarn and 5 patrol crafts including HTMS Ratcharit, HTMS U-domdej, HTMS Soo Pirin, HTMS Chonburi, and HTMS Kantang. At the end of the season, the club could be promoted to the Thai League 3. They use the Battleship Stadium as a ground to compete for the T3 in the 2022–23 season.

In late 2022, Fleet competed in the Thai League 3 for the 2022–23 season. It is their first season in the professional league. The club started the season with a 1–2 away defeat to Chachoengsao Hi-Tek and they ended the season with a 1–0 home win over the Chachoengsao Hi-Tek. The club has finished sixth place in the league of the Eastern region.

== Stadium and locations ==
Coordinates	Location	Stadium	Year
12°39′39″N 100°55′24″E	Chonburi	Battleship Stadium	2022 – present

== Season by season record ==
Season	League									FA Cup	League Cup	T3 Cup	Top goalscorer	
Season	Division	P	W	D	L	F	A	Pts	Pos	FA Cup	League Cup	T3 Cup	Name	Goals
2022	TA East	6	5	1	0	14	4	16	1st	Opted out	Ineligible		(Thailand) Yotsakorn Burapha	7
2022–23	T3 East	22	8	5	9	27	28	29	6th	Opted out	Opted out		(Nigeria) Ademola Sodiq Adeyemi	9
2023–24	T3 East	20	5	9	6	24	26	24	7th	QR	QRP	R2	(Thailand) Thanphisit Hempandan, (Thailand) Jakrayut Vivatvanit	5
2024–25	T3 East	22	13	6	3	38	19	45	2nd	QR	QR1	LP	(Thailand) Somsak Musikaphan	11
2025–26	T3 East	22	15	4	3	36	15	49	1st	R2	QR1	LP	(Brazil) Tiago Chulapa	14

Champions	Runners-up	Promoted	Relegated

- P = Played
- W = Games won
- D = Games drawn
- L = Games lost
- F = Goals for
- A = Goals against
- Pts = Points
- Pos = Final position
- QR1 = First Qualifying Round
- QR2 = Second Qualifying Round
- R1 = Round 1
- R2 = Round 2
- R3 = Round 3
- R4 = Round 4
- R5 = Round 5
- R6 = Round 6
- QF = Quarter-finals
- SF = Semi-finals
- RU = Runners-up
- W = Winners

== Players ==
=== Current squad ===
As of 18 January 2025

Note: Flags indicate national team as defined under FIFA eligibility rules; some limited exceptions apply. Players may hold more than one non-FIFA nationality.

No.	Pos.	Nation	Player
1	GK	THA	Titisak Thaewpinee
2	FW	THA	Teeratep Pangkham
3	DF	CMR	Frank Touko Nzola
4	MF	THA	Thanakit Boonchoo
5	MF	THA	Nawaphonn Sonkham
6	DF	THA	Phongpeera Prajongsai
7	DF	THA	Chawlit Waenthong
8	MF	THA	Ratchanon Insungnoen
9	FW	THA	Suraphon Potha
10	MF	THA	Jakrayut Vivatvanit
11	MF	THA	Andayut Nimnuch
13	FW	URU	Pedro Manzi
14	MF	THA	Vorakan Kavila
15	MF	THA	Wanusanun Thana
16	DF	THA	Alongkorn Thongjean
17	DF	THA	Tanakrit Kaukeaw
18	GK	THA	Peerapong Watjanapayon
19	FW	THA	Anuson Thaloengram

No.	Pos.	Nation	Player
20	MF	THA	Thanapat Karin
21	MF	THA	Nittikorn Pengsawat
23	DF	THA	Surasit Netyong
24	DF	THA	Arnon Phikunthong
26	DF	THA	Saranphat Srirat
28	MF	THA	Kampanat Trongparnith
31	DF	THA	Weerapan Thongnak
33	MF	THA	Wuttigral Umprakhon
34	FW	THA	Somsak Musikaphan
35	GK	THA	Phoowis Hlao-sri
40	GK	THA	Bundid Suksa
44	MF	THA	Pakkaphon Phengsuay
55	MF	THA	Narutchai Nimboon
77	MF	THA	Chayaphat Srirat
88	FW	BRA	Neto Santos
91	FW	THA	Jakkapong Polmart
99	GK	THA	Athiraj Sunathom

== Club staff ==
Position	Name
Chairman	(Thailand) Nawin Thananet
Head Coach	(Thailand) Wiriya Phaophan
Assistant Coach	(Thailand) Somjit Thepjang (Thailand) Supachai Khamthrap
Goalkeeper Coach	(Thailand) Thawatchai Phimphuthon
Assistant Goalkeeper Coach	(Thailand) Denchai Chatikam
Masseur	(Thailand) Thitinan Niamnukul
Team Officer	(Thailand) Kuson Phengphon (Thailand) Ananchai Phengsawat (Thailand) Sitthichai Namwiset Woraphop (Thailand) Woraphop Moyya
Team Coordinator	(Thailand) Sitthiphon Baiya
Media Officer	(Thailand) Nattawut Prachaithep

== Honours ==
=== Domestic competitions ===
- Thai League 3 Eastern Region
  - Winners (1): 2025–26
