= Chachoengsao Hi-Tek F.C. =

Association football club in Thailand

Chachoengsao Hi-Tek FC ฉะเชิงเทรา ไฮเทค เอฟซี
- Full name: Chachoengsao Football Club สโมสรฟุตบอลจังหวัดฉะเชิงเทรา
- Nicknames: The Fighting Fish (ปลากัดนักสู้แห่งลุ่มแม่น้ำบางปะกง)
- Short name: CCSFC
- Founded: 1997; 29 years ago
- Ground: Fighting Fish Stadium; Chachoengsao, Thailand
- Capacity: 6,000
- Chairman: Chanawit Chaisaeng
- Manager: Thanetr Bunlap
- League: Thai League 3
- 2025–26: Thai League 3, 9th of 12 in the Eastern region
- Website: chachoengsao-fc.com
Home colours	Away colours

Chachoengsao Hi-Tek Football Club (Thai: สโมสรฟุตบอลจังหวัดฉะเชิงเทรา), commonly referred to as "Padrew", is a Thai professional football club based in Chachoengsao Province. They have played in the Thai League 3 Northern region. The club's home stadium is Pimpayachan Stadium. The club founded in 1997 to play semi-professional football tournament in Thailand until 2007, they can promote to play in Thailand professional football league. The club's nickname is "The Fighting Fish" (Thai: Pla Kud Nak Su), the most popular fish in the province. The club is currently playing in the Thai League 3 Eastern region.

== History ==
At first, when Chachoengsao FC was still an amateur club (club first name is Look Luang Phor Sothon FC), they used to complete in the Yamaha Thailand Cup. In 1997, they managed to pass the eastern group stage and were promoted to the regional level (division 2). Chachoengsao FC would join Thai Division 1 League in 2007. But they couldn't compete at this level, and were immediately relegated to Division 2, after just one season. Since then, Chachoengsao FC has good performance in second division, and nearly to qualify for the play-offs in 2010–2011. In addition, in 2011 season, Akarawin Sawasdee, the striker No.16 got the top goal scores and best striker awards in 2011 Thai Division 2 League Central & Eastern Region. In 2012 season, the Thailand Tobacco Monopoly support team for main sponsor.

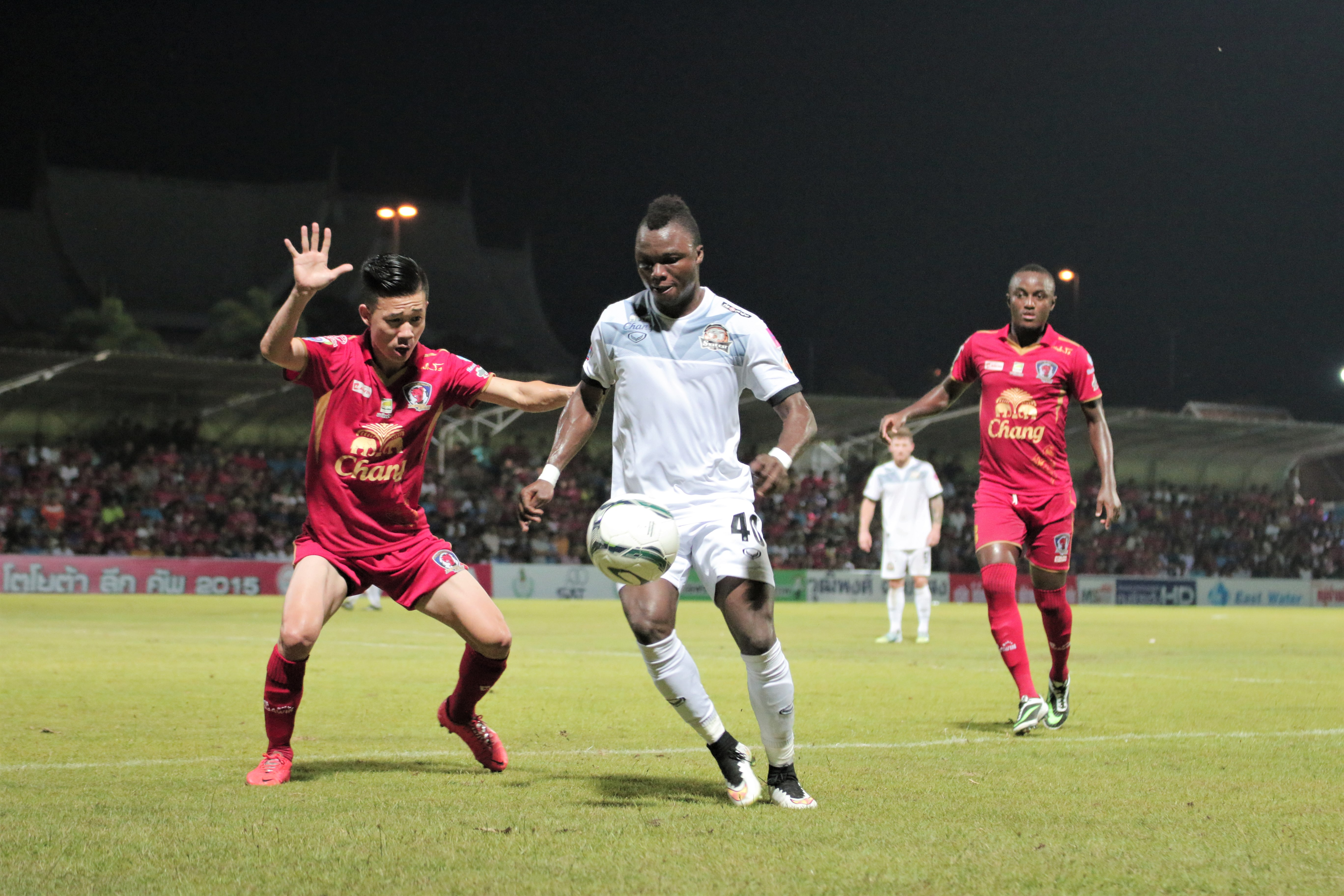
Chachoengsao FC vs SWAT Cat Korat in 2015.

In 2022, Chachoengsao Hi-Tek competed in the Thai League 3 for the 2022–23 season. It is their 18th season in the professional league. The club started the season with a 2–1 home win over Fleet and they ended the season with a 0–1 away defeat to Fleet. The club has finished 4th place in the league of the Eastern region. In addition, in the 2022–23 Thai League Cup Chachoengsao Hi-Tek was defeated 2–3 by Nakhon Pathom United in the qualification play-off round, causing them to be eliminated.

== Stadium ==
Chachoengsao Province has 2 football stadiums, When they first race in TFA tournament Chachoengsao F.C. used the provincial stadium to play their home matches. In 2008, there are a lot of supporter and the provincial stadium had insufficient seats, in addition, provincial stadium be used for another activities of province, then they are move to use Chachoengsao Province Stadium or Subin Pimpayachan Stadium for race football in home match only. The Subin Pimpayachan Stadium has built for commemorate to "Mr.Subin Pimpayachan", the important people of province. The stadium have capacity 3,778 seat.

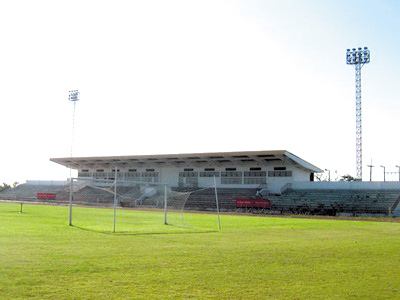
Pimpayachan Stadium

== Supporters ==
The supporters of Chachoengsao FC called "Fighting Fish Friend" (Thai; Puen Pla Kad). They used No.8 for a symbol, because the No.8 come from "Pad" (Thai; Pad = Eight, 8) in "Padrew". In 2010, the team gave the No.8 to Chachoengsao F.C. supporters.

== Timeline ==
History of events of Chachoengsao FC

Year	Important events
1997	The club is formed as Chachoengsao FC, nicknamed The Fighting Fish
2005	Was range 4th in Pro League 2, promote to Pro League 1
2006	Thai Football association include Pro League 1 with Thai Premier League Division 1
2007	After a miserable season, finishing 11th, relegated to Division 2
2009	Part of the shake up of Thai football, moved into Regional League Central/East

== Stadium and locations ==
Coordinates	Location	Stadium	Year
13°42′08″N 101°02′43″E	Chachoengsao	Subin Pimpayachan Stadium	2007
13°41′23″N 101°04′06″E	Chachoengsao	Chachoengsao Town municipality Stadium	2008
13°42′08″N 101°02′43″E	Chachoengsao	Subin Pimpayachan Stadium	2009–2012
13°41′23″N 101°04′06″E	Chachoengsao	Chachoengsao Town municipality Stadium	2013–2017

== Season by season record ==
Season	League									FA Cup	League Cup	T3 Cup	Top goalscorer	
Season	Division	P	W	D	L	F	A	Pts	Pos	FA Cup	League Cup	T3 Cup	Name	Goals
2005	DIV2								4th	Opted out				
2006	DIV1	30	8	7	15			31	14th	Opted out				
2007	DIV1 B	22	4	7	11	18	40	19	11th	Opted out			(Thailand) Sirisak Romphothong	
2008	DIV2 A	20	6	5	9	17	32	23	8th	Opted out			(Cameroon) Manoz Roger	8
2009	DIV2 Central-East	22	8	7	7	32	31	31	7th	R1			(Cameroon) Edu Kwaku	
2010	DIV2 Central-East	30	7	11	12	27	40	32	12th	R2	R2		(Thailand) Jo Mingsamorn	
2011	DIV2 Central-East	30	14	9	7	54	45	51	7th	R2	R1		(Thailand) Akarawin Sawasdee	19
2012	DIV2 Central-East	34	10	6	18	33	48	36	12th	R1	R1		(Thailand) Jeerachai Ladadok	6
2013	DIV2 Central-East	26	10	7	9	43	31	37	7th	Opted out	Opted out			
2014	DIV2 Central-East	26	10	10	6	48	36	40	6th	Opted out	Opted out			
2015	DIV2 Central-East	26	15	6	5	54	31	51	2nd	Opted out	R1			
2016	DIV2 East	22	11	7	4	46	22	40	2nd	R1	R1		(Thailand) Sarawut Choenchai	15
2017	T3 Upper	26	10	4	12	42	38	34	7th	QR	QR1		(Thailand) Sarawut Choenchai	14
2018	T3 Upper	26	6	11	9	37	35	29	9th	QR	QR2		(Thailand) Padungsak Phonak	6
2019	T3 Upper	24	8	6	10	19	26	30	6th	R1	QR2		(Thailand) Sarawut Choenchai	5
2020–21	T3 East	17	11	5	1	37	9	38	2nd	R1	QR1		(Brazil) Lucas Massaro Garcia Gama	15
2021–22	T3 East	22	13	6	3	34	17	45	2nd	QR	QPR		(Brazil) Caio da Conceição Silva	12
2022–23	T3 East	22	10	3	9	29	28	33	4th	Opted out	QRP		(Brazil) Caio da Conceição Silva	12
2023–24	T3 East	20	7	5	8	28	22	26	5th	QR	QRP	QR2	(Cameroon) Nyamsi Jacques Dominique	7
2024–25	T3 East	22	7	8	7	19	20	29	7th	R2	QRP	LP	(Thailand) Supasan Arjrod	10
2025–26	T3 East	22	3	10	9	13	20	19	9th	R1	QR2	LP	(France) Shayn Djelloul Chekalil, (Thailand) Supasan Arjrod	4

Champions	Runners-up	Promoted	Relegated

== Players ==
=== Current squad ===
As of 20 September 2024

Note: Flags indicate national team as defined under FIFA eligibility rules; some limited exceptions apply. Players may hold more than one non-FIFA nationality.

No.	Pos.	Nation	Player
1	GK	THA	Apisit Gosila
2	DF	THA	Kittikun Bunjasntssm
3	DF	CMR	Jacques Nyamsi
4	DF	THA	Tantakron Verasin
5	MF	THA	Seubsakul Sangworndee
6	MF	THA	Kiettisak Siripratum
7	MF	THA	Sirisak Rhomphothong
9	FW	THA	Supasan Arjrod
10	FW	THA	Nattaphon Phawandee
11	MF	THA	Phakhawat Seekhieo
13	DF	JPN	Hideto Ozaki
14	FW	THA	Kittisak Bunmak
15	MF	THA	Panussak Klongkamnujenkan
18	GK	THA	Chatphong Sukhophan
19	MF	THA	Pornchai Pongprasit
20	MF	THA	Chitipat Kaeoyos

No.	Pos.	Nation	Player
21	DF	THA	Terapol Pukdenimit
22	DF	THA	Wiritphon Khaman
23	DF	THA	Thanongsak Sonthisawat
25	DF	THA	Yodsaporn In-thong
27	MF	THA	Manop Seesumran
29	DF	THA	Kasipat Boonyakornchindet
30	MF	THA	Phollaphat Kaewkanlaya
47	DF	THA	Phuwadol Soma
48	MF	THA	Puchit Wetchawong
49	MF	THA	Achirawit Leraharattanarak
78	DF	THA	Tanakrit Lomnak
88	FW	THA	Chanaphai Phoocheera
91	FW	CIV	Mohamed Kourouma
92	GK	THA	Shinnapat Chamnongsilp
99	FW	THA	Oakkharawut Phakyu

== Coaching staff ==
Position	Name
Manager	(Thailand) Thanetr Bunlap
Assistant Manager	
Goalkeeping Coach	
Fitness Coach	
Video Analyst	
Director of Performance	
Head of Sports Science	
Head of Strength & Conditioning	
Physiotherapist	
Head of Analysis	
Head of Performance Analysis	
Recruitment Analyst	
Kit Manager	

== Honours ==
- Regional League Central-East Division
  - Runners-up (1): 2015
