= Simone Valli =

Italian professional footballer

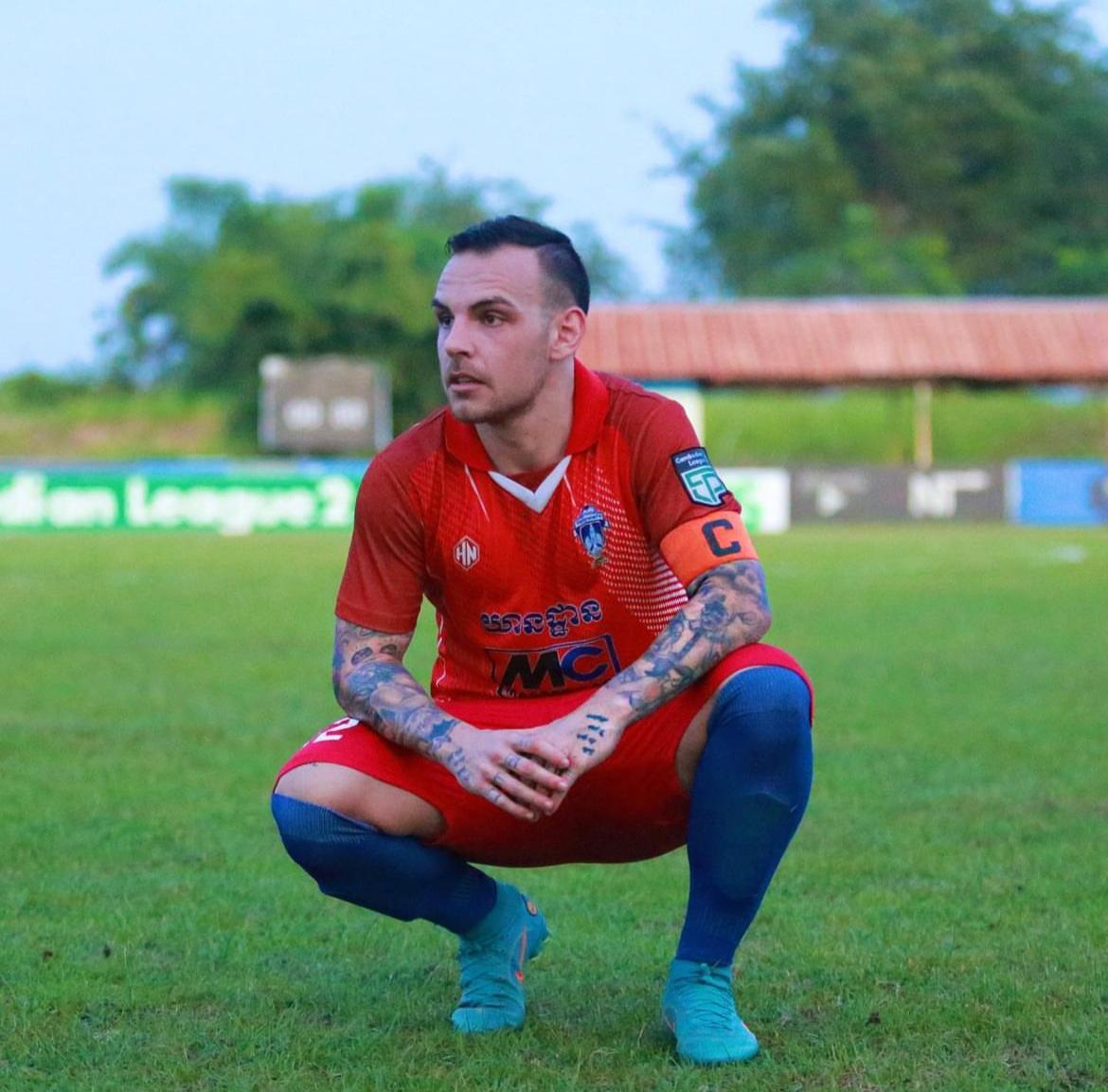
- Valli with Banteay Meanchey F.C. in 2022, Cambodia

Personal information
- Full name: Simone Valli
- Date of birth: 3 March 1995 (age 31)
- Place of birth: Seriate, Bergamo, Italy
- Height: 1.71 m (5 ft 7 1/2 in)
- Position: Midfielder

Youth career
- 2010–2014: Virtus Bergamo

Senior career*
Years	Team	Apps	(Gls)
2014	Olhanense	0	(0)
2014-2015	Cardiff F.C. U21	6	(0)
2015	Jumilla	13	(3)
2016-2017	Soimii Panchota	4	(0)
2018	Samut Songkhram FC	19	(5)
2018	Surin Sugar KMC	12	(3)
2019	Squadron FC	15	(6)
2020	San Marcos FC	13	(3)
2020-2021	Regional Sports FC	9	(0)
2022-2023	Banteay Meanchey	12	(8)
2023/2024	ACDC	16	(7)
2024/2025	Marines football Club		
- * Club domestic league appearances and goals as of 13 January 2023

Simone Valli (born 3 March 1995) is an Italian footballer Currently playing as a Midfielder for Marines F.C. in Thai League 3. The club is in Sattaip (Chonburi Province). Though he played football in several countries Been also a Capitain in Second League in Cambodia. He also can Speaks multiple leanguage.

== Football (Soccer) career ==
=== Early career ===
Born in Seriate, Bergamo, Simone Valli began his youth career with Virtus Bergamo. In 2013, at the age of eighteen, he moved to Portugal and was signed by S.C. Olhanense. After one year, he joined Cardiff U21 team. Then he moved to Spain, signing up to FC Jumilla, in Segunda División B. In 2016, Valli joined Romanian Liga II side Soimii Panchota.

=== Thailand ===
In 2018 Valli moved to Thailand and became the first Italian footballer to play in a local football club. He was firstly signed by Samut Songkhram FC and after six months Valli joined Surin Sugar KMC FC. In Surin, a town in east Thailand, near the Cambodian border, while in Surin, Valli founded the Italian Soccer Academy to teach local children about European football.

=== Hong Kong, Venezuela and Nicaragua ===
In summer 2019, Valli spent three months in Hong Kong with Squadron FC and North District FC. Then he moved to Venezuela, joining FC Yaracuy. However, due to some bureaucratic problems related to foreign athletes, he was forced to leave the team and in January 2020 he moved to Nicaragua. Despite the COVID-19 pandemic, Valli played until April and, at the end of the season, he was elected Best player for the 2019/2020 season and Best foreigner in the Clausura Tournament.

=== United Arab Emirates ===
After terminating his contract in Nicaragua and as soon as the conditions to fly were favorable, Valli moved to the United Arab Emirates where he was signed by the second division team Regional Sports FC, of Abu Dhabi. Even though he sustained an injury to his foot (fractured toe), Valli decided to continue training with the team. Valli played in three games with Regional Sports FC before the tournament was paused for two weeks due to COVID-19 outbreaks. After the two weeks break Valli decided to terminate his contract with Regional Sports FC.

=== Cambodia ===
On July 1, 2022, Valli signed with the Cambodian League 2 club Banteay Meanchey FC, and subsequently moved to Cambodia.

== Personal life ==
Simone Valli travels the world playing soccer. He can speak Spanish, English, French, Italian, Portuguese and Thai
