= Chitipat Kaeoyos =

Thai footballer

Personal information
- Full name: Chitipat Kaeoyos
- Date of birth: 21 March 2003 (age 23)
- Place of birth: Pathum Thani, Thailand
- Height: 1.80 m (5 ft 11 in)
- Position: Midfielder

Team information
- Current team: Pattaya United
- Number: 20

Youth career
- 2010–2014: OAZ Academy
- 2015–2019: PTT Rayong

Senior career*
Years	Team	Apps	(Gls)
2019	PTT Rayong	1	(0)
2021–2022	Samut Prakan City	2	(0)
2022–2023	Banbueng	16	(0)
2023–2024	Prachinburi City	16	(0)
2024–2025	Chachoengsao Hi-Tek	17	(0)
2025–	Pattaya United	8	(0)

International career
2018	Thailand U16	5	(0)
2022	Thailand U23	0	(0)
- * Club domestic league appearances and goals

Chitipat Kaeoyos (Thai: ชิติพัทธ์ แก้วยศ, born 21 March 2003) is a Thai professional footballer who plays as a midfielder for Pattaya United in the Thai League 2.

== Club career ==
=== PTT Rayong ===
In 2019, at 16 years 6 months and 8 days, Chitipat became the youngest player to play for PTT Rayong after making his professional football debut against Chonburi in the Thai League 1. In addition, he also became the 4th youngest player to play in the Thai League 1.

=== Samut Prakan City ===
In 2021, Chitipat made his debut for Samut Prakan City against Muangthong United in the Thai League 1.

== International career ==
Chitipat was part of the Thailand U16 squad in the 2018 AFC U-16 Championship.
