= Prachinburi City F.C. =

Association football club in Thailand

Prachinburi City ปราจีนบุรี ซิตี้
- Full name: Prachinburi City Football Club
- Nickname(s): The eastern soldier river barb (ตะโกกบูรพา)
- Founded: 2018; 7 years ago
- Ground: Prachinburi PAO. Stadium; Prachinburi, Thailand
- Capacity: 3,000
- Coordinates: 14°03′52″N 101°22′30″E
- Owner: Prachinburicity Footballclub Co., Ltd.
- Chairman: Chairat Songnawarat
- Head coach: Surachai Lamoonket
- League: Thailand Semi-pro League
- 2023–24: Thai League 3, 11th of 11 in the Eastern region (relegated)
- Website: https://web.facebook.com/PrachinburiCity

Prachinburi City Football Club (Thai: สโมสรฟุตบอล ปราจีนบุรี ซิตี้) is a Thai football club based in Mueang, Prachinburi, Thailand. The club is currently playing in the Thai League 3 Eastern region.

== History ==
In 2018, the club was established.

In 2019, the club competed in Thailand Amateur League Eastern region until 2022.

In early 2023, the club competed in Thailand Semi-Pro League Eastern region finished in 1st placed of the region, promoted to the Thai League 3.

== Stadium and locations ==
Coordinates	Location	Stadium	Year
14°03′52″N 101°22′30″E	Mueang, Prachinburi	Prachinburi PAO. Stadium	2023 – present

== Season by season record ==
Season	League									FA Cup	League Cup	T3 Cup	Top goalscorer	
Season	Division	P	W	D	L	F	A	Pts	Pos	FA Cup	League Cup	T3 Cup	Name	Goals
2019	TA East	3	3	0	0	11	0	9	1st	Opted out	Ineligible			
2020	Cancelled									R1	Ineligible			
2021	Cancelled									R1	Ineligible			
2022	TA East	3	3	0	0	18	2	9	1st	R1	Ineligible		(Thailand) Abdulkordiri Hamid, (Thailand) Chaianan Lamchiak, (Thailand) Patinya Chaiaumnuay	3
2023	TS East	6	5	0	1	11	4	15	1st	R3	Ineligible		(Thailand) Abdulkordiri Hamid, (Thailand) Kittisak Chaisonkhram	3
2023–24	T3 East	20	3	2	15	9	42	11	11th	Opted out	QR2	QR2	(Thailand) Jaturong Pimkoon	2

Champions	Runners-up	Promoted	Relegated

- P = Played
- W = Games won
- D = Games drawn
- L = Games lost
- F = Goals for
- A = Goals against
- Pts = Points
- Pos = Final position
- QR1 = First Qualifying Round
- QR2 = Second Qualifying Round
- R1 = Round 1
- R2 = Round 2
- R3 = Round 3
- R4 = Round 4
- R5 = Round 5
- R6 = Round 6
- QF = Quarter-finals
- SF = Semi-finals
- RU = Runners-up
- W = Winners

== Players ==
=== Current squad ===
As of 23 September 2023

Note: Flags indicate national team as defined under FIFA eligibility rules; some limited exceptions apply. Players may hold more than one non-FIFA nationality.

No.	Pos.	Nation	Player
1	GK	(Thailand) THA	Arnachak Audomroeksereechai
2	DF	(Thailand) THA	Weerachai Paencokesung
3	DF	(Thailand) THA	Khamron Phanchaem
4	DF	(Thailand) THA	Mathawin Chueanun
5	MF	(Thailand) THA	Nattawut Promsri
6	MF	(Thailand) THA	Kittikoon Pawong
7	FW	(Thailand) THA	Phuriphat Klinsut
8	MF	(Thailand) THA	Kittisak Banjong
9	FW	(Thailand) THA	Jaturong Pimkoon
10	FW	(Thailand) THA	Patinya Chaiaumnuay
11	FW	(Thailand) THA	Tuwanon Boonma
14	MF	(Thailand) THA	Phommin Kaeosanga
15	DF	(Thailand) THA	Kittituch Khomdumdin
17	MF	(Thailand) THA	Phatthadon Charoenchit
18	GK	(Thailand) THA	Nattan Plaidueng

No.	Pos.	Nation	Player
19	MF	(Thailand) THA	Bannawit Seanbuapho
20	MF	(Thailand) THA	Chitipat Kaeoyos
22	DF	(Thailand) THA	Piyapan Chantroon
23	DF	(Thailand) THA	Nuttanan Sudkham
25	MF	(Thailand) THA	Pornchai Teakprakhon
29	MF	(Thailand) THA	Kittithat Promang
32	DF	(Thailand) THA	Sila Ponrachom
33	DF	(Thailand) THA	Pongsak Seakraw
34	DF	(Thailand) THA	Weerachai Supprasert
44	MF	(Thailand) THA	Kittisak Chaisonkhram
66	MF	(Thailand) THA	Phattarapong Sirikrathok
81	GK	(Thailand) THA	Ammarin Sukcharoenkul
86	GK	(Thailand) THA	Rattanasak Pongpai
88	DF	(Thailand) THA	Chaiyawat Thungkrathok
99	FW	(Thailand) THA	Abdulkordiri Hamid
