= Navy F.C. =

Thai football club

Navy ราชนาวี
- Full name: Navy Football Club สโมสรฟุตบอลราชนาวี
- Nicknames: Ta Han Nam (ตะหานน้ำ)
- Founded: 10 January 1956; 70 years ago, as Royal Thai Navy Football Club
- Ground: Sattahip Navy Stadium; Chonburi, Thailand
- Capacity: 6,000
- Owner: Royal Thai Navy
- Head Coach: Sinthaweechai Hathairattanakool
- League: Thai League 3
- 2025–26: Thai League 3, 3rd of 12 in the Eastern region
- Website: siamnavyfc.com
Home colours	Away colours	Third colours

Active departments of Royal Thai Navy
Football	Football B	Futsal

Navy Football Club (Thai: สโมสรฟุตบอลราชนาวี) is a Thai professional football club under the stewardship of Royal Thai Navy based in Chonburi. They play in the Thai League 3. The club has previously played under the names of Royal Thai Navy, Rajnavi and Rajnavy Rayong.

== History ==
The club was formed on 10 January 1956 as the Royal Thai Navy Football Club and currently plays under the name of Navy Football Club, locally known as Rajnavy. The club has also played under the names of Rajnavi and Rajnavy Rayong, Rayong being the town they played in and the main base of the Navy in general.

Since the inception of the Thai League in 1996 the club played under the name of the Royal Thai Navy up until 2009, when all teams in Thailand had to become public limited companies. With this, many teams changed names and formed closer links with the communities they were based in. In this case the Navy became known as Rajnavy Rayong. Rajnavy being the local Thai name for the Navy. In 2011, and with a dispute as to the ownership of the club, the club moved from their Rayong home and into the Chonburi province where they ground share with Pattaya United – another club playing outside of their original home town – albeit against league rules, where two sides in the PLT cannot ground share.

=== Ownership dispute ===
In 2009, when Thai football was becoming increasingly popular with all professional football teams told to properly register and become a company limited, the situation was almost to the point where anyone could register this football club for an ownership. At this point, Rayong Thai Premier took the ownership and renamed the club to Rajnavy Rayong. However, two seasons after that, the Royal Thai Navy decided to bring the team back under control and renamed it to Siam Navy. Thereafter, the football club moved from Rayong to Sattahip, Chonburi.

=== Turmoil ===
At the start of the 2011 league campaign, with the Navy in a bit of turmoil after the dispute of the owner of the club, they proceeded to get it wrong on the field as well. Their opening game of the season against Sisaket, was awarded 2–0 to Sisaket after an original 1–1 draw due to Siam Navy playing an ineligible player. To make things worse, the club knew the player in question couldn't play, but carried on hoping to get away with any sanctions – especially since the league is normally lax in the rules.

=== Queens Cup success ===
In 2006 the club won the opening season Queen's Cup tournament. A tournament that is not mandatory but nonetheless a big part of the Thai football calendar at the time. They defeated Krung Thai Bank in the final after getting past Bangkok Bank at the semi-final stage.

=== Yo-yo club ===
The club has somewhat become known as a yo-yo club in the Thai football scene, being relegated and promoted from/to the top flight on four occasions. Although on each occasion they were promoted they were not as champions.

=== Football competitions ===
In 2022, Navy competed in the Thai League 3 for the 2022–23 season. It is their 26th season in the professional league. The club started the season with a 1–2 away defeat to Chanthaburi and they ended the season with a 1–1 home draw with Chanthaburi. The club has finished 11th place in the league of the Eastern region. In addition, in the 2022–23 Thai FA Cup Navy was defeated 2–4 by Amnat Charoen City in the second round, causing them to be eliminated and in the 2022–23 Thai League Cup Navy was penalty shoot-out defeated 3–5 by Uthai Thani in the qualification play-off round, causing them to be eliminated too.

== Stadium and locations by season records ==
Coordinates	Location	Stadium	Capacity	Year
12°39′50″N 100°56′09″E	Sattahip, Chonburi	Sattahip Navy Stadium	12,500	2007–2008
12°40′49″N 101°14′08″E	Rayong	Rayong Province Stadium	14,000	2009–2010
13°24′41″N 100°59′37″E	Chonburi	Institute of Physical Education Chonburi Campus Stadium	12,000	2011
12°39′50″N 100°56′09″E	Sattahip, Chonburi	Sattahip Navy Stadium	12,500	2011–present

== Players ==
As of 1 September 2026

Note: Flags indicate national team as defined under FIFA eligibility rules; some limited exceptions apply. Players may hold more than one non-FIFA nationality.

No.	Pos.	Nation	Player
7	MF	THA	Pongpan Parapan
8	MF	THA	Phutchapong Namsrithan
9	FW	BRA	Danilo
10	MF	THA	Nattawut Sombatyotha
11	MF	FRA	Queran Verset
13	MF	THA	Rattassak Wiang-in
19	FW	THA	Akarawin Sawasdee
20	MF	THA	Gan Kleabphueng
26	MF	THA	Thatchapol Chai-yan

No.	Pos.	Nation	Player
27	FW	BRA	Bruno Garcia Marcate
28	MF	THA	Thanathon Chanphet
29	MF	THA	Nitithum Sirisin
31	MF	THA	Nurul Sriyankem
37	GK	THA	Satiparp Boonkilang
46	DF	THA	Sitthisak Inyai
47	FW	THA	Phonlawat Domnok
54	FW	THA	Isariyapol Chomchoei
57	MF	THA	Chinnawat Photha
88	MF	THA	Jeelasak Saengchomphoo

=== Former Players ===
(Indonesia) Victor Igbonefo (2016)

== Season by season domestic record ==
Season	League									FA Cup	League Cup	T3 Cup	Top scorer	
Season	Division	P	W	D	L	F	A	Pts	Pos	FA Cup	League Cup	T3 Cup	Name	Goals
1996–97	TPL	34	13	12	9	44	29	51	9th					
1997	TPL	22	3	6	13	20	41	15	12th					
1998	DIV 1	–	–	–	–	–	–	–	–					
1999	DIV 1	–	–	–	–	–	–	–	–					
2000	TPL	22	5	11	6	21	22	26	6th					
2001–02	TPL	22	6	3	13	14	31	21	10th					
2002–03	DIV 1	–	–	–	–	–	–	–	2nd					
2003–04	TPL	18	5	4	9	18	27	19	7th					
2004–05	TPL	18	3	1	14	11	33	10	10th					
2006	DIV 1	–	–	–	–	–	–	–	2nd					
2007	TPL	30	5	12	13	21	35	27	15th					
2008	DIV 1	30	15	10	5	35	22	55	3rd					
2009	TPL	30	8	6	16	28	39	30	12th	R3			(Thailand) Suttinan Nontee	8
2010	TPL	30	8	9	13	35	52	33	10th	SF	SF			
2011	TPL	34	9	6	19	28	51	33	16th	R3	R2			
2012	DIV 1	34	13	10	11	55	44	50	7th	R2	R1			
2013	DIV 1	34	10	10	14	42	47	40	10th	R3	R3		(South Korea) Jeong Woo-geun	10
2014	DIV 1	34	17	9	8	41	26	60	3rd	R3	R2		(Cameroon) Ludovick Takam	13
2015	TPL	34	10	5	19	42	65	35	15th	R3	R3		(Brazil) Rodrigo Vergilio	12
2016	TL	31	7	10	14	24	40	31	14th	R1	R2		(Paraguay) Anggello Machuca	5
2017	T1	34	10	10	14	42	50	40	13th	R2	R1		(Brazil) Rodrigo Vergilio	15
2018	T1	34	7	9	18	44	85	30	16th	R3	R1		(Ivory Coast) Amadou Ouattara	13
2019	T2	34	9	6	19	35	50	33	16th	R1	R1		(Thailand) Chusana Numkanitsorn	10
2020–21	T2	34	11	7	16	47	53	40	11th	R2	–		(Brazil) Douglas Rodrigues	9
2021–22	T2	34	2	5	27	28	71	11	18th	QR	QR		(Nigeria) Adefolarin Durosinmi	8
2022–23	T3 East	22	4	9	9	20	27	21	11th	R2	QRP		(Thailand) Sirichai Phumpat, (Thailand) Wutthinan Thaweerathitsakul	4
2023–24	T3 East	20	7	7	6	38	20	28	4th	QR	R1	R1	(Thailand) Pongpan Parapan	6
2024–25	T3 East	22	15	6	1	49	14	51	1st	R2	QR2	R16	(Argentina) Panigazzi Matías Ignacio	19
2025–26	T3 East	22	11	7	4	32	17	40	3rd	QR	QR1	QF	(Thailand) Nurul Sriyankem, (South Korea) Yoo Byung-soo	7

Champions	Runners-up	Third place	Promoted	Relegated

- P = Played
- W = Games won
- D = Games drawn
- L = Games lost
- F = Goals for
- A = Goals against
- Pts = Points
- Pos = Final position
- N/A = No answer
- T1 = Thai League 1
- T2 = Thai League 2
- T3 = Thai League 3
- QR1 = First Qualifying Round
- QR2 = Second Qualifying Round
- QR3 = Third Qualifying Round
- QR4 = Fourth Qualifying Round
- RInt = Intermediate Round
- R1 = Round 1
- R2 = Round 2
- R3 = Round 3
- R4 = Round 4
- R5 = Round 5
- R6 = Round 6
- GR = Group stage
- QF = Quarter-finals
- SF = Semi-finals
- RU = Runners-up
- S = Shared
- W = Winners

== Honours ==
- Thai Division 1 League:
  - Runner-up: 2006
- Thai League 3 Eastern Region
  - Winners: 2024–25
- Queen's Cup:
  - Winner: 2006
- Thai League Cup:
  - Winner: 1990
- Khor Royal Cup (Thai: ถ้วย ค.):
  - Winner: 1989
- Ngor Royal Cup (Thai: ถ้วย ง.):
  - Winner: 1974
