= Saimit Kabin United F.C. =

Thai football club

Saimit Kabin United สายมิตร กบินทร์ ยูไนเต็ด
- Full name: Saimit Kabin United Football Club สโมสรฟุตบอล สายมิตร กบินทร์ ยูไนเต็ด
- Nicknames: The Hanuman (หนุมานชาญสมร)
- Founded: 2013; 13 years ago
- Ground: Nom Klao Maharaj Stadium; Prachinburi
- Capacity: 3,000
- Chairman: Krit Budnian
- Manager: Sorrasak Ratson
- League: Thai League 3
- 2025–26: Thai League 3, 6th of 12 (Eastern region)
Home colours	Away colours

Saimit Kabin United Football Club (Thai: สโมสรฟุตบอล สายมิตร กบินทร์ ยูไนเต็ด) is a Thai football club based in Kabin Buri, Prachinburi Province. The club currently plays in the Thai League 3 Eastern region.

== History ==
The Club was established in 2013. It has the nickname Hanuman Chansamorn. As for the club's symbol, it features Hanuman, which is the emblem of Kabin Buri District. Near the stadium, a Hanuman monument has been erected. In 2022, Saimit Kabin United competed in the Thai League 3 for the 2. It is their 10th season in the professional league. The club has finished 3rd in the Eastern region. In addition, in the 2022–23 Thai FA Cup Saimit Kabin United was defeated 0–1 by Police Tero in the third round. and in the 2022–23 Thai League Cup Saimit Kabin United was penalty shoot-out defeated 2–3 by Chanthaburi in the second qualification round, causing them to be eliminated too.

== Stadium and locations ==
Coordinates	Location	Stadium	Year
13°59′20″N 101°43′25″E	Prachinburi	Nom Klao Maharaj Stadium	2013–

== Season by season record ==
Season	League									FA Cup	League Cup	T3 Cup	Top goalscorer	
Season	Division	P	W	D	L	F	A	Pts	Pos	FA Cup	League Cup	T3 Cup	Name	Goals
2013	Central-East	26	4	2	20	22	51	14	13th	Opted out	Opted out			
2014	Central-East	26	3	3	20	31	61	12	14th	Opted out	Opted out			
2015	Central-East	26	8	7	11	39	46	31	8th	Opted out	R1			
2016	East	22	6	5	11	20	34	23	11th	Opted out	R1			
2017	T4 East	27	7	7	13	25	36	28	9th	Opted out	QR1			
2018	T4 East	27	9	8	10	35	35	35	5th	Opted out	QR1		(Ghana) Amidu Jamal, (Thailand) Mathee Pungpo	8
2019	T4 East	28	10	10	8	32	30	40	4th	Opted out	QR1		(Thailand) Mathee Pungpo	9
2020–21	T3 East	17	6	7	4	13	17	25	5th	QR	QR1		(Thailand) Thanapat Krongyut	3
2021–22	T3 East	22	10	7	5	34	27	37	5th	QR	QR2		(Brazil) Fabricio Peris Carneiro	8
2022–23	T3 East	22	10	7	5	28	17	37	3rd	R3	QR2		(Brazil) Victor Capinan (Brazil) Fabricio Peris Carneiro	5
2023–24	T3 East	20	13	4	3	23	7	43	1st	R3	QR2	R1	(Cameroon) Cedrick Platini Kaham	5
2024–25	T3 East	22	9	7	6	25	23	34	4th	QR	QR1	QF	(Nigeria) Ademola Sodiq Adeyemi	7
2025–26	T3 East	22	9	6	7	24	26	33	6th	Opted out	QR2	R16	(Brazil) Marcelo de Souza Silva	6

== Players ==
=== Current squad ===
As of 20 September 2025

Note: Flags indicate national team as defined under FIFA eligibility rules; some limited exceptions apply. Players may hold more than one non-FIFA nationality.

No.	Pos.	Nation	Player
2	MF	THA	Pornsawan Sankla
6	MF	THA	Surachett Khunnu (Captain)
7	FW	THA	Yod Chantawong
11	FW	BRA	Marcelo de Sousa Silva
15	DF	THA	Sonkritsana Sirimanon
17	DF	THA	Katakon Setsri
18	MF	THA	Chanaphon Tiwari
19	DF	THA	Kittisak Wantawee
10	FW	KOR	Jung Seung-min
21	FW	THA	Noppanai Charoenrung
27	FW	THA	Worrachai Kanthum
28	MF	THA	Watcharapol Saisi

No.	Pos.	Nation	Player
29	DF	THA	Thanachot Chomkhunthod
31	MF	THA	Wasam Mala
35	DF	THA	Wathana Chaisawan
37	MF	THA	Kaittisak Chaiyasing
42	DF	THA	Tawan Chanthasen
46	DF	THA	Nuttapong Deeduaychat
49	GK	THA	Thanakorn Kanphai
77	FW	THA	Ratthaphak Naew-olo
79	MF	THA	Thana Seesutham
86	MF	THA	Jettarin Phetborisu
90	GK	THA	Anuchid Taweesri
99	GK	THA	Sutthiphong Khamnikon

== Honours ==
=== Domestic ===
- Thai League 3 Eastern Region
  - Winners (1): 2023–24
