= Si Racha Municipal Stadium =

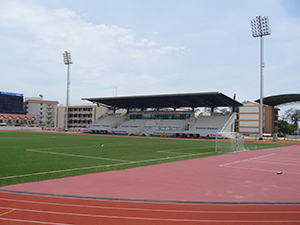
- Interactive map of Si Racha Municipal Stadium
- Location: Si Racha, Chonburi, Thailand
- Coordinates: 13°10′20″N 100°55′41″E
- Owner: Si Racha Municipality
- Operator: Si Racha Municipality
- Capacity: 5,000
- Surface: Grass

Tenant
- Sriracha F.C. 2011-2012

Si Racha Municipal Stadium (Thai: สนามกีฬาเทศบาลเมืองศรีราชา) is a multi-purpose stadium in Si Racha, Chonburi, Thailand. It is currently used mostly for football matches. The stadium holds 5,000 people.
