= Prapat Yoskrai =

Thai footballer

Personal information
- Full name: Prapat Yoskrai
- Date of birth: 30 July 1993 (age 33)
- Place of birth: Bangkok, Thailand
- Height: 1.80 m (5 ft 11 in)
- Position: Goalkeeper

Team information
- Current team: Trat
- Number: 30

Youth career
- 2009–2011: Assumption College Thonburi

Senior career*
| Years | Team | Apps | (Gls) |
| 2009–2010 | Rajpracha | 16 | (0) |
| 2010–2011 | Assumption United | 19 | (0) |
| 2011–2016 | Super Power Samut Prakan | 3 | (0) |
| 2013–2014 | → Phuket (loan) | 12 | (0) |
| 2014–2015 | → Thai Honda (loan) | 9 | (0) |
| 2017 | PTU Pathumthani | 16 | (0) |
| 2017–2018 | PTT Rayong | 2 | (0) |
| 2018 | Kasetsart | 4 | (0) |
| 2019 | Ubon United | 19 | (0) |
| 2020–2022 | Khon Kaen | 25 | (0) |
| 2022– | Trat | 2 | (0) |

International career
| 2011–2012 | Thailand U19 | 1 | (0) |
- * Club domestic league appearances and goals as of 30 April 2023

Prapat Yoskrai (Thai: ประพัฒน์ ยศไกร, born July 30, 1993), simply known as Bank, (Thai: แบงค์) is a Thai professional footballer who plays as a goalkeeper for Thai League 2 club Trat.

== Honours ==
=== International ===
Thailand U-19

- AFF U-19 Youth Championship: 2011
