= Lucas Daubermann =

Brazilian footballer (born 1995)

Personal information
- Full name: Lucas Felipe Daubermann
- Date of birth: 18 March 1995 (age 31)
- Place of birth: Santa Rosa, Brazil
- Height: 1.85 m (6 ft 1 in)
- Position: Defender

Youth career
- 2010: Internacional
- 2011: Juventus-SP
- 2011: Grêmio
- 2012: Novo Hamburgo
- 2013: Fluminense
- 2014–2015: Avaí

Senior career*
Years	Team	Apps	(Gls)
2016–2017	Madureira	2	(0)
2018–2020	Kataller Toyama	38	(2)
2021	Kochi United	25	(3)
2022–2023	Toyama Shinjo Club		
2023–2024	Phrae United	26	(1)
- * Club domestic league appearances and goals as of 10 December 2024 (UTC)

Lucas Felipe Daubermann (born 18 March 1995) is a Brazilian footballer.

== Career statistics ==
=== Club ===
As of 26 January 2021.

Club	Season	League			Cup		Other		Total	
Club	Season	Division	Apps	Goals	Apps	Goals	Apps	Goals	Apps	Goals
Madureira	2016	Série D	2	0	0	0	7 (Note: Appearances in the Copa Rio)	0	9	0
Kataller Toyama	2018	J3 League	17	1	0	0	0	0	17	1
Kataller Toyama	2019	J3 League	13	1	2 (Note: Appearances in the Emperor's Cup)	1	0	0	15	2
Kataller Toyama	2020	J3 League	8	0	0	0	0	0	8	0
Kataller Toyama	Total		38	2	2	1	0	0	40	3
Kochi United	2021	Japan Football League	25	3	2	0	0	0	27	3
Career total			65	5	4	1	7	0	76	6
