= Mueang Chachoengsao district =

Mueang Chachoengsao เมืองฉะเชิงเทรา
- District
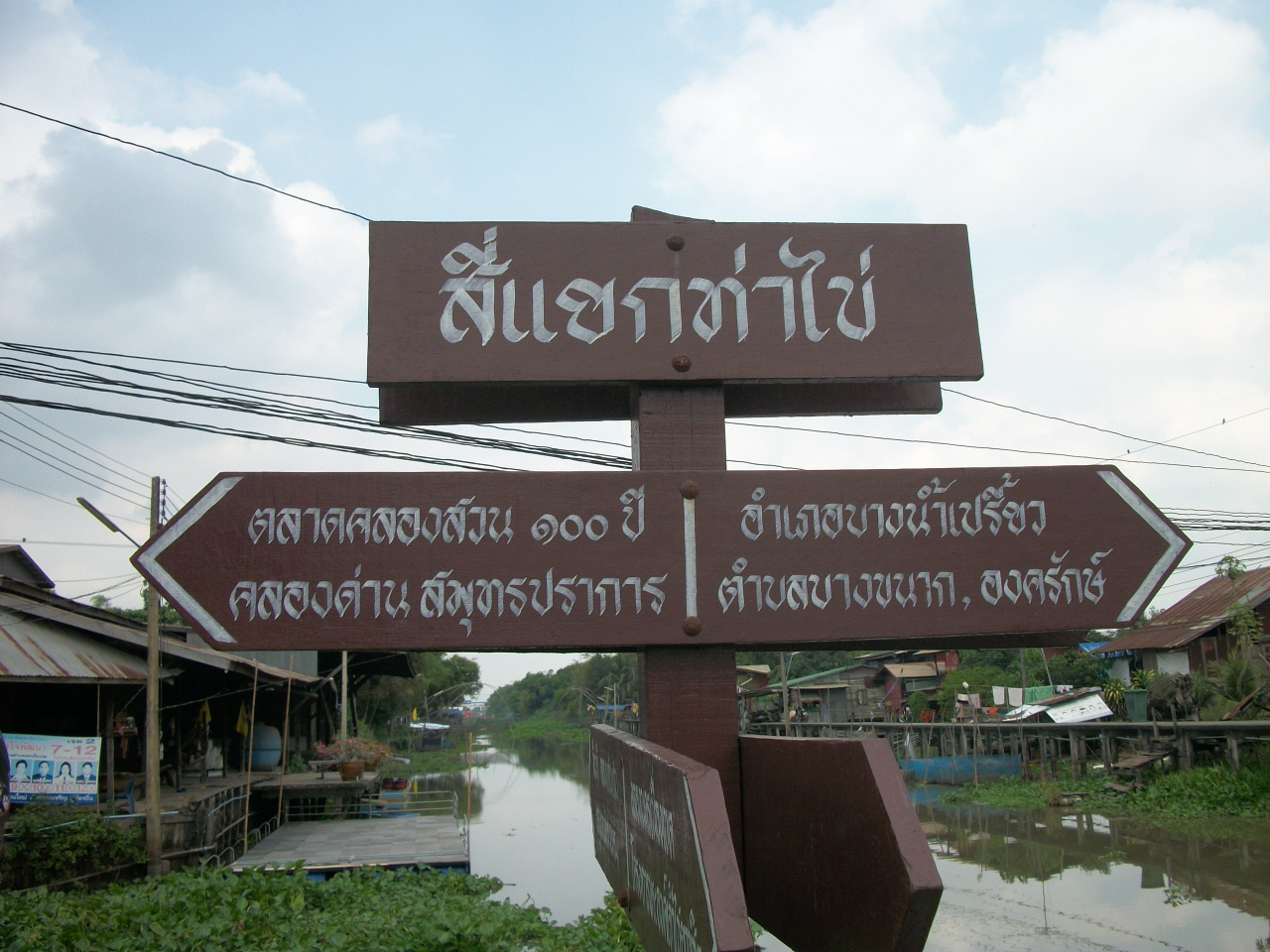
- Tha Khai Intersection in the Nakhon Nueang Khet Ancient Market, Khlong Nakhon Nueang Khet subdistrict

- District location in Chachoengsao province
- Coordinates: 13°41′19″N 101°4′15″E
- Country: Thailand
- Province: Chachoengsao

Area
  - Total: 378.7 km^{2} (146.2 sq mi)

Population (2017)
  - Total: 158,722
  - Density: 419.12/km^{2} (1,085.5/sq mi)
- Time zone: UTC+7 (ICT)
- Postal code: 24000
- Geocode: 2401

Mueang Chachoengsao (Thai: เมืองฉะเชิงเทรา, pronounced [mɯ̄a̯ŋ t͡ɕʰàʔ.t͡ɕʰɤ̄ːŋ.sāw]), formerly named the Mueang Paet Rio District (Thai: เมืองแปดริ้ว), is the capital district (amphoe mueang) of Chachoengsao province, Eastern Thailand.

== History ==
Mueang Chachoengsao district was established in 1896. The present district office is close to the bank of the Bang Pakong River in Na Mueang subdistrict.

== Geography ==
Neighboring districts are (from the north clockwise): Bang Nam Priao, Khlong Khuean, Bang Khla, Ban Pho of Chachoengsao Province; Bang Bo of Samut Prakan province; Lat Krabang and Nong Chok of Bangkok.

The important water resource are the Bang Pakong River and Khlong Nakhon Nueang Khet.

== Administration ==
=== Central administration ===
Mueang Chachoengsao is divided into 19 subdistricts (tambons), which are further subdivided into 192 administrative villages (mubans).

No.	Name	Thai	Villages	Pop.
1.	Na Mueang	หน้าเมือง	-	39,328
2.	Tha Khai	ท่าไข่	17	10,498
3.	Ban Mai	บ้านใหม่	5	2,857
4.	Khlong Na	คลองนา	5	4,988
5.	Bang Tin Pet	บางตีนเป็ด	13	8,963
6.	Bang Phai	บางไผ่	10	4,866
7.	Khlong Chuk Krachoe	คลองจุกกระเฌอ	8	2,848
8.	Bang Kaeo	บางแก้ว	12	6,279
9.	Bang Khwan	บางขวัญ	14	6,909
10.	Khlong Nakhon Nueang Khet	คลองนครเนื่องเขต	17	7,703
11.	Wang Takhian	วังตะเคียน	10	6,487
12.	Sothon	โสธร	7	6,619
13.	Bang Phra	บางพระ	10	5,975
14.	Bang Kahai	บางกะไห	9	4,155
15.	Nam Daeng	หนามแดง	7	3,196
16.	Khlong Preng	คลองเปรง	12	10,283
17.	Khlong Udom Chonlachon	คลองอุดมชลจร	9	8,756
18.	Khlong Luang Phaeng	คลองหลวงแพ่ง	14	12,002
19.	Bang Toei	บางเตย	13	6,010

=== Local administration ===
There is one town (thesaban mueang) in the district:

- Chachoengsao (Thai: เทศบาลเมืองฉะเชิงเทรา) consisting of subdistrict Na Mueang.

There is one subdistrict municipality (thesaban tambon) in the district:

- Nakhon Nueang Khet (Thai: เทศบาลตำบลนครเนื่องเขต) consisting of parts of subdistrict Khlong Nakhon Nueang Khet.

There are 18 subdistrict administrative organizations (SAO) in the district:

- Tha Khai (Thai: องค์การบริหารส่วนตำบลท่าไข่) consisting of subdistrict Tha Khai.
- Ban Mai (Thai: องค์การบริหารส่วนตำบลบ้านใหม่) consisting of subdistrict Ban Mai.
- Khlong Na (Thai: องค์การบริหารส่วนตำบลคลองนา) consisting of subdistrict Khlong Na.
- Bang Tin Pet (Thai: องค์การบริหารส่วนตำบลบางตีนเป็ด) consisting of subdistrict Bang Tin Pet.
- Bang Phai (Thai: องค์การบริหารส่วนตำบลบางไผ่) consisting of subdistrict Bang Phai.
- Khlong Chuk Krachoe (Thai: องค์การบริหารส่วนตำบลคลองจุกกระเฌอ) consisting of subdistrict Khlong Chuk Krachoe.
- Bang Kaeo (Thai: องค์การบริหารส่วนตำบลบางแก้ว) consisting of subdistrict Bang Kaeo.
- Bang Khwan (Thai: องค์การบริหารส่วนตำบลบางขวัญ) consisting of subdistrict Bang Khwan.
- Khlong Nakhon Nueang Khet (Thai: องค์การบริหารส่วนตำบลคลองนครเนื่องเขต) consisting of parts of subdistrict Khlong Nakhon Nueang Khet.
- Wang Takhian (Thai: องค์การบริหารส่วนตำบลวังตะเคียน) consisting of subdistrict Wang Takhian.
- Sothon (Thai: องค์การบริหารส่วนตำบลโสธร) consisting of subdistrict Sothon.
- Bang Phra (Thai: องค์การบริหารส่วนตำบลบางพระ) consisting of subdistrict Bang Phra.
- Bang Kahai (Thai: องค์การบริหารส่วนตำบลบางกะไห) consisting of subdistrict Bang Kahai.
- Nam Daeng (Thai: องค์การบริหารส่วนตำบลหนามแดง) consisting of subdistrict Nam Daeng.
- Khlong Preng (Thai: องค์การบริหารส่วนตำบลคลองเปรง) consisting of subdistrict Khlong Preng.
- Khlong Udom Chonlachon (Thai: องค์การบริหารส่วนตำบลคลองอุดมชลจร) consisting of subdistrict Khlong Udom Chonlachon.
- Khlong Luang Phaeng (Thai: องค์การบริหารส่วนตำบลคลองหลวงแพ่ง) consisting of subdistrict Khlong Luang Phaeng.
- Bang Toei (Thai: องค์การบริหารส่วนตำบลบางเตย) consisting of subdistrict Bang Toei.
