= 2025–26 Thai FA Cup =

Chang FA Cup

Tournament details
- Country: Thailand
- Dates: 24 September 2025 – 31 May 2026
- Teams: 95

Final positions
- Champions: Buriram United (8th title)
- Runners-up: PT Prachuap

Tournament statistics
- Matches played: 94
- Goals scored: 353 (3.76 per match)
- Top goal scorer(s): Aliu Micheal Abdul (7 goals)

Awards
- Best player: Sasalak Haiprakhon

The 2025–26 Thai FA Cup is the 32nd season of Thai FA Cup, Thailand's top knockout football competition. Officially named the Chang FA Cup (Thai: ช้าง เอฟเอคัพ) due to sponsorship from Chang, the tournament is organized by the Football Association of Thailand and open to clubs across all divisions. 95 clubs entered the competition, which began with the qualification round on 24 September 2025 and will conclude with the final on 31 May 2026.

Clubs from Thai League 2, Thai League 3, the Thailand Semi-pro League, and the Thailand Amateur League compete in the qualification round, with some clubs receiving byes to the first round, which features 64 teams. Thai League 1 clubs automatically enter at this round. Matches in the qualification round proceed to penalties if tied after 90 minutes, while from the first round onward, extra time and penalties are used to determine the winner. All rounds are single-elimination, with home advantage determined by draw, except for the semifinals and final, which are held at neutral venues.

The tournament winner will earn a spot in the 2026–27 AFC Champions League Elite League stage and the 2026 Thailand Champions Cup. The champion will also receive a prize of 5,000,000 baht, while the runner-up will be awarded 1,000,000 baht. As one of the most prestigious competitions in Thai football, the FA Cup offers clubs from all tiers a chance to compete for national honors.

== Schedule ==
Round	Date	Matches	Clubs	New entries this round
Qualification round	24 September 2025	31	10 + 33 + 9 + 10 → 31	10 2025–26 Thai League 2; 33 2025–26 Thai League 3; 9 Thailand Semi-pro League; 10 Thailand Amateur League
First round	29–30 October 2025	32	31 + 16 + 4 + 6 + 3 + 4 → 32	16 2025–26 Thai League 1; 4 2025–26 Thai League 2; 6 2025–26 Thai League 3; 3 Thailand Semi-pro League; 4 Thailand Amateur League
Second round	20–21 December 2025	16	32 → 16	
Third round	14 January 2026	8	16 → 8	
Quarter-finals	25 February 2026	4	8 → 4	
Semi-finals	17 May 2026	2	4 → 2	
Final	31 May 2026	1	2 → Champions	
Total				95 clubs

== Results ==
Note: T1: Clubs from Thai League 1; T2: Clubs from Thai League 2; T3: Clubs from Thai League 3; TS: Clubs from Thailand Semi-pro League; TA: Clubs from Thailand Amateur League.

=== Qualification round ===
The qualification round of the 2025–26 Thai FA Cup featured 62 clubs, comprising 10 clubs from 2025–26 Thai League 2, 33 clubs from 2025–26 Thai League 3, 7 clubs from Thailand Semi-pro League, and 12 clubs from the Thailand Amateur League. The draw for this round took place on 29 August 2025. 114 goals were scored in this round.

24 September 2025	Prime Bangkok (T3)	1–1 (5–3 p)	Surin City (T3)	Lak Si, Bangkok
15:30 (UTC+7)	Alexandar Mutic 26'	Report; Highlight	Mun Te-su 90+5' (pen.)	Stadium: NT Stadium; Attendance: 220; Referee: Alongkorn Feemuechang; Assistant referees: Nanthawat Chobsuan, Kunathorn Ketchantra; Fourth official: Thanakorn Suksri
	Penalties
	Chawanwit Saelao (penalty scored); Aphirak Suankan (penalty scored); Wongsakorn Buasamlee (penalty scored); Aekkaphong Phlmankasemsri (penalty scored); Jiranat Sopaanan (penalty scored)		(penalty scored) Mun Te-su; (penalty scored) Kaison Roungreang; (penalty missed) Nattawut Wutthiya; (penalty scored) Kitsanaphat Kingkaeo

24 September 2025	ACDC (T3)	0–0 (5–4 p)	Surindra (TS)	Sattahip, Chonburi
15:30 (UTC+7)		Report		Stadium: Battleship Stadium; Attendance: 65; Referee: Theerayut Radarit; Assistant referees: Sujin Rodart, Jasada Tongkam; Fourth official: Pheerapat Yodnak
	Penalties
	Ken Hagihara (penalty scored); Podsathorn Somyod (penalty missed); Phongsapuk Luangon (penalty scored); Dolla Chaleonrach (penalty scored); Jerry Ichako Akose (penalty scored); Phasit Phanmoon (penalty scored)		(penalty scored) Anupong Samatong; (penalty scored) Songphon Benchamat; (penalty scored) Suphakrit Yamdee; (penalty missed) Suebsakul Prachantra; (penalty scored) Aphisit Somdang; (penalty missed) Natipong Sriphet

24 September 2025	PSU Surat Thani City (T3)	9–0	APD United (TA)	Mueang, Surat Thani
15:30 (UTC+7)	Natthakit Keawphutphong 7'; Sutthiwat Chamnan 16'; Teerawat Durnee 24', 43', 45'; Natthawut Aiamchan 25'; Sirawit Benchamat 86', 90+3'; Adinan Mongman 87'	Report		Stadium: Stadium of Prince of Songkla University, Surat Thani Campus; Attendance: 517; Referee: Wacharawit Suwanraksa; Assistant referees: Anantasak Yakoh, Kamal Srisaard; Fourth official: Jiraphan Yodphut

24 September 2025	Uttaradit (T3)	2–0	Nakhon Si United (T2)	Mueang, Uttaradit
15:30 (UTC+7)	Kittisak Wantawee 39'; Diego Silva 75'	Report; Highlight		Stadium: Uttaradit Provincial Stadium; Attendance: 440; Referee: Wathanyu Morin; Assistant referees: Waranyoo Chomgoson, Nonthanan Khanthawong; Fourth official: Woottipong Ketkam

24 September 2025	Ayutthaya PK (TS)	0–1	Nonthaburi United (T3)	Phra Nakhon Si Ayutthaya, Phra Nakhon Si Ayutthaya
15:30 (UTC+7)		Report	Debiro Dzarma Bata 89'	Stadium: Stadium of Rajamangala University of Technology Suvarnabhumi, Huntra Campus; Referee: Kittichai Huthip; Assistant referees: Kittichok Huthip, Patcharapon Losomsup; Fourth official: Saravut Suksalee

24 September 2025	Muang Klaeng (TA)	0–13	Marines (T3)	Klaeng, Rayong
15:30 (UTC+7)		Report	Thanyapat Thanawut 4', 44', 45'; Sattawat Yanjinda 7', 28', 39'; Attapong Kittichamratsak 15'; Akaradet Rattanasri 24'; Thanaphat Kamjhonkiadtikun 51', 82'; Worachet Prapaipak 78'; Melih Faruk Bircok 79'; Sornchai Klongkratok 84'	Stadium: Klaeng Town Municipality Stadium; Attendance: 50; Referee: Pongthep Raipimai; Assistant referees: Premsak Rungrueang, Kanathip Waithaisong; Fourth official: Palathip Homwarn

24 September 2025	Phetchabun (TS)	1–4	Burapha United (T3)	Mueang, Phetchabun
15:30 (UTC+7)	Kittamet Intarakul 13'	Report	Sutayut Ura 11'; Tewarit Thogkamchum 20'; Prawit Jittithaworn 28'; Warayut Klomnak 37'	Stadium: Phetchaburi Provincial Stadium; Attendance: 231; Referee: Piyapong Thongkhain; Assistant referees: Suwit Kongtongnok, Jonrak Sangcharern; Fourth official: Chookiat Boonchoo

24 September 2025	Thonburi Forest (TA)	0–0 (8–7 p)	Namphong United (TA)	Phra Samut Chedi, Samut Prakan
15:30 (UTC+7)		Report		Stadium: Laemfhapa Subdistrict Municipality Stadium; Attendance: 342; Referee: Chaiwat Rupsa-at; Assistant referees: Adisai Pongnairat, Siravich Konngam; Fourth official: Watcharasak Intharak
	Penalties
	Pattrawat Nilsri (penalty scored); Kripoinchai Nopcharoen (penalty scored); Nonthawat Rungsawang (penalty scored); Weeraphat Phanphakdee (penalty scored); Setthapong Karunalai (penalty scored); Teerasak Taprakhon (penalty scored); Montree Wangsop (penalty scored); Taweesin Chunjai (penalty scored)		(penalty scored) Monthon Pokha; (penalty scored) Pitipat Sopa; (penalty scored) Pattadon Bumrungrat; (penalty scored) Worawit Jekkham; (penalty scored) Wathanyu Seephang; (penalty scored) Natthapol Thiabphim; (penalty scored) Phumin Thachai; (penalty missed) Chakkit Wuttitanaanan

24 September 2025	Muang Loei United (T3)	1–1 (2–3 p)	Kasetsart (T2)	Mueang, Loei
15:30 (UTC+7)	Abdelrahman Osama Mohamed 78'	Report	Nonthaphut Panaimthon 69'	Stadium: Loei Provincial Stadium; Attendance: 120; Referee: Kanoksak Khiaodaeng; Assistant referees: Rachan Dawangpa, Jirapun Hongsudta; Fourth official: Chinnawat Kottai
	Penalties
	Apidet Janngam (penalty scored); Ratthasat Buaban (penalty scored); Abdelrahman Osama Mohamed (penalty missed); Marciano de Oliveira Filho Odair (penalty missed); Amporn Chaipong (penalty missed)		(penalty scored) Lee Jae-yong; (penalty missed) Kantaphat Nivasakul; (penalty scored) Chonmapoom Chupayakka; (penalty scored) Nonthaphut Panaimthon; (penalty missed) Karn Jorates

24 September 2025	Samui United (T3)	20–0	Nakhon Pathom City (TA)	Ko Samui, Surat Thani
15:30 (UTC+7)	Pornprom Furzer 15', 24'; Amarin Chaisuesat 17', 36', 73', 76'; Thanadon Yankaew 23', 42', 53'; Amornsin Phoonakhaw 43'; Songkitti Thongkam 58', 84'; Aliu Micheal Abdul 62', 65', 67', 71', 78', 86', 89'; Alfred Ernest Terry 90'	Report		Stadium: Ko Samui City Municipality International Stadium; Attendance: 171; Referee: Farid Baenak; Assistant referees: Hadis Kaesaman, Aris Bissalimin; Fourth official: Tiwakorn Sawangpong

24 September 2025	Kanthararom United (TA)	1–4	Khon Kaen (T3)	Mueang, Sisaket
15:30 (UTC+7)	Arnon Thongpanya 86'	Report; Highlight	Sakunchai Saengthopho 2'; Charin Boodhad 26', 71'; John Caio Camargo Silva 90+4' (pen.)	Stadium: Stadium of Sisaket Rajabhat University; Attendance: 200; Referee: Kittiwat Kittpaksakun; Assistant referees: Apisit Yotayut, Athipbordee Seekhoaun; Fourth official: Sittichai Saramai

24 September 2025	Futera United (T3)	1–6	Nongbua Pitchaya (T2)	Khlong Luang, Pathum Thani
15:30 (UTC+7)	Khwanchai Khuanam 26'	Report	Thanawut Phochai 3', 45+1'; Kento Nagasaki 24'; Peeranan Baukhai 40'; Caio Rodrigues da Cruz 85' (pen.); Panupong Phuakphralap 90'	Stadium: Stadium of Bangkok University; Attendance: 111; Referee: U-sen Yala; Assistant referees: Nuannid Donjangreed, Siwat Chaithong; Fourth official: Putthipong Issising

24 September 2025	Sriracha (TS)	0–3	Nakhon Sawan See Khwae City (T3)	Si Racha, Chonburi
15:30 (UTC+7)		Report	Thanawat Ruamrua 30'; Khemmachat Pakhwan 64'; Varachon Puntivanon 69'	Stadium: Sriracha Town Municipality Stadium; Attendance: 300; Referee: Worapon Sanjan; Assistant referees: Panuwat Weawkum, Krisit Homhual; Fourth official: Anocha Praphatson

24 September 2025	Nakhon Phanom United (TS)	1–5	Lopburi City (T3)	Mueang, Nakhon Phanom
15:30 (UTC+7)	Worawit Chaikamol 7'	Report	Eric Kumi 20', 43', 72'; Andrey Coutinho 45+2'; Sani Kamil 67'	Stadium: Stadium of Nakhon Phanom University; Attendance: 326; Referee: Anan Keawmuangkhun; Assistant referees: Nakarin Thongkerd, Kit Khlaithong; Fourth official: Teeramate Pooprang

24 September 2025	Roi Et 2018 (TA)	3–1	Pathum Thani (TS)	Mueang, Roi Et
15:30 (UTC+7)	Chanathip Chompoowiset 17', 80'; Thanakorn Thongchai 45+1'	Report	Pongpiti Samphaodi 90+7'	Stadium: Roi Et Provincial Stadium; Attendance: 800; Referee: Amnat Makklang; Assistant referees: Ponlakrit Wangkoon, Kittichot Worasan; Fourth official: Chairat Phooalai

24 September 2025	Inter Bangkok (TA)	0–1	Kamphaengphet (T3)	Thanyaburi, Pathum Thani
15:30 (UTC+7)		Report	Rayner Moraes Costa 56'	Stadium: Stadium of Rajamangala University of Technology Thanyaburi; Attendance: 150; Referee: Dassakhon Hokla; Assistant referees: Theerapat Insena, Titima Wongkhan; Fourth official: Sukree Kurteng

24 September 2025	Nakhon Nayok (TS)	0–0 (14–13 p)	Phrae (TS)	Mueang, Nakhon Nayok
15:30 (UTC+7)		Report		Stadium: Nakhon Nayok Provincial Stadium; Attendance: 250; Referee: Chaiyot Hapholdee; Assistant referees: Chakrit Siripong, Arpaporn Thaisoda; Fourth official: Panya Nawasimainam
	Penalties
	Nattapon Pongkum (penalty scored); Patiwat Sanjnlerd (penalty scored); Theekhathat Jeamsorn (penalty scored); Monton Wongwichian (penalty missed); Kittisak Chaisonkhram (penalty scored); Nuttawut Pothong (penalty scored); Nuttapol Rasri (penalty scored); Rattatummanoon Rungruaeng (penalty scored); Rathasart Janthawut (penalty scored); Rachata Jannongsuang (penalty scored); Sorasit Chuenchob (penalty scored); Theekhathat Jeamsorn (penalty scored); Nattapon Pongkum (penalty scored); Patiwat Sanjnlerd (penalty missed); Kittisak Chaisonkhram (penalty scored); Monton Wongwichian (penalty scored)		(penalty scored) Khunanon Chornpradit; (penalty scored) Chinathip Treewised; (penalty scored) Suriya Raksaphakdee; (penalty missed) Ratchata Chantae; (penalty scored) Thanathat Rungrot; (penalty scored) Nathan Thipnang; (penalty scored) Pawin Anantaniyom; (penalty scored) Papungkon Duangngun; (penalty scored) Kroekkiat Kongkramut; (penalty scored) Siwat Seedad; (penalty scored) Passakorn Rueangruk; (penalty scored) Khunanon Chornpradit; (penalty scored) Chinathip Treewised; (penalty missed) Suriya Raksaphakdee; (penalty scored) Thanathat Rungrot; (penalty missed) Nathan Thipnang

24 September 2025	Singburi Warriors (T3)	1–3	Chiangmai United (T2)	Mueang, Singburi
15:30 (UTC+7)	Sattrawut Auppachai 89'	Report	Kantapong Bandasak 11', 13'; Athaset Thongnak 82'	Stadium: Singburi PAO. Stadium; Attendance: 135; Referee: Samrit Ritkaew; Assistant referees: Sumate Peasiri, Thanet Jairaw; Fourth official: Nattaphak Sawasdee

24 September 2025	UD Vessuwan (TA)	0–1	Udon United (T3)	Mueang, Udon Thani
15:30 (UTC+7)		Report	Jhakkarin Sitthichan 17'	Stadium: Udon Thani SAT Stadium; Referee: Manuschai Chawong; Assistant referees: Korakit Sonjan, Bongkarn Sudtae; Fourth official: Komkrit Sawong

24 September 2025	Karin United (TS)	0–0 (2–4 p)	Samut Songkhram City (T3)	Phutthamonthon, Nakhon Pathom
15:30 (UTC+7)		Report		Stadium: Stadium of Rajamangala University of Technology Rattanalosin; Attendance: 100; Referee: Pichit Thongjanmoon; Assistant referees: Khomchalach Lekhawijit, Yanin Nanthakampira; Fourth official: Kittithat Kengketkorn
	Penalties
	Chanonthum Chundee (penalty scored); Sirasit Changkomchom (penalty missed); Lattpon Tobnak (penalty missed); Siranat Sriwanat (penalty scored)		(penalty scored) Witusn Khamsom; (penalty scored) Teeranan Saenta; (penalty scored) Tanusorn Boonyalai; (penalty scored) Datchrit Chotichutipisal

24 September 2025	Nara United (T3)	0–0 (5–3 p)	Bangkok (T2)	Mueang, Narathiwat
15:30 (UTC+7)		Report; Highlight		Stadium: Narathiwat PAO. Stadium; Attendance: 2,430; Referee: Sapuding Kalong; Assistant referees: Phitsanu Chusi, Phongsiri Chusi; Fourth official: Aibroheem Sama
	Penalties
	Pedro Lucas de Jesus Paixão Martins (penalty scored); Lucas Grossi de Araujo Reis (penalty scored); Takuya Fushimi (penalty scored); Rakpong Chumuang (penalty scored); Patipat Kamsat (penalty scored)		(penalty scored) Phattharaphol Khamsuk; (penalty scored) Carlos Eduardo dos Santos Lima; (penalty missed) AJ Inia; (penalty scored) Warawut Motim

24 September 2025	Rajpracha (T3)	0–1	Bankhai United (T3)	Bang Yai, Nonthaburi
16:00 (UTC+7)		Report	Chinnapat Kaikaew 45+2'	Stadium: Nonthaburi Stadium; Attendance: 235; Referee: Boonsong Prachumrak; Assistant referees: Theerapon Nonthakhamjan, Bukhori Lehnuh; Fourth official: Song Montha

24 September 2025	Navy (T3)	2–6	Ubon Kids City (TA)	Sattahip, Chonburi
17:00 (UTC+7)	Yuri Martins Rocha 73'; Nurul Sriyankem 75'	Report	Sihanart Sutisuk 29', 36'; Tanet Saengthong 68', 75'; Treerapong Seree 78'; Teerawat Lionyum 84'	Stadium: Sattahip Navy Stadium; Attendance: 200; Referee: Ekkalak Muangkhotr; Assistant referees: Attapol Soheng, Puttipong Saensarn; Fourth official: Chinnaphat Lablae

24 September 2025	Customs United (T3)	1–1 (4–3 p)	Chainat Hornbill (T2)	Bang Phli, Samut Prakan
17:00 (UTC+7)	Anan Samaae 78'	Report; Highlight	Piyaruck Kwangkaew 45+1'	Stadium: Stadium of Customs Department, Lad Krabang 54; Attendance: 180; Referee: Natee Choosuwan; Assistant referees: Sahatnet Deemongkol, Kiadtisak Janmol; Fourth official: Suriyo Kanhachalee
	Penalties
	Anapat Nakngam (penalty missed); Natthawut Srichan (penalty scored); Aitsara Suktaeng (penalty scored); Tatsuya Tanaka (penalty scored); Anumat Seewongkaew (penalty scored)		(penalty scored) Adolph Koudakpo; (penalty scored) Thanayut Hamanee; (penalty missed) Tatsuhide Shimizu; (penalty missed) Thammakai Jaidee; (penalty scored) Tanin Kiatlerttham

24 September 2025	Samut Sakhon City (T3)	2–0	Thap Luang United (T3)	Mueang, Samut Sakhon
17:00 (UTC+7)	Worapart Chaenram 15'; Thanachok Chitrak 27'	Report		Stadium: Stadium of Thailand National Sports University, Samut Sakhon Campus; Attendance: 298; Referee: Trin Sahachaipat; Assistant referees: Tibeth Longtree, Wilawan Rattanakhot; Fourth official: Palakorn Parasatit

24 September 2025	Sisaket United (T2)	3–2	Padriew City (T3)	Mueang, Sisaket
18:00 (UTC+7)	Pansiri Sukunee 16'; Kittipong Wongma 21' (pen.); Phattharapong Phengchaem 27' (pen.)	Report; Highlight	Jeremiah Kegbe 60' (pen.), 81'	Stadium: Sri Nakhon Lamduan Stadium; Attendance: 305; Referee: Somkhid Sarapim; Assistant referees: Nattapong Wadweangcom, Anupong Sangtopo; Fourth official: Pongdanai Sadsadee

24 September 2025	Pattaya United (T2)	0–3	BFB Pattaya City (T3)	Bang Lamung, Chonburi
18:00 (UTC+7)		Report; Highlight	Abdolreza Zarei 9'; Kim Jin-hyeong 33'; Achirawat Saimee 65'	Stadium: Nong Prue Stadium; Attendance: 1,081; Referee: Sila Jinnigorn; Assistant referees: Anucha Pinamon, Sarayut Sriampri; Fourth official: Satchukorn Saenchu

24 September 2025	Phitsanulok (T3)	1–1 (4–2 p)	Roi Et PB United (T3)	Mueang, Phitsanulok
18:00 (UTC+7)	Parintorn Trakarnchan 34'	Report	Santirad Weing-in 45'	Stadium: Phitsanulok PAO. Stadium; Attendance: 429; Referee: Supat Chaingam; Assistant referees: Saksit Jantain, Thanawat Sangkon; Fourth official: Anurak Sankaew
	Penalties
	Burnel Okana-Stazi (penalty scored); Nuttasit Choosai (penalty scored); Juan Francisco Odorisio (penalty scored); Navapan Thianchai (penalty scored)		(penalty missed) Saichon Magmesoog; (penalty missed) Teerapong Deehamhae; (penalty scored) Chalermpong Kerdkaew; (penalty scored) Chatchai Chiakklang

24 September 2025	Chiangmai (T3)	0–0 (5–4 p)	Udon Banjan United (T3)	Mueang, Chiang Mai
18:00 (UTC+7)		Report		Stadium: Chiangmai City Municipality Stadium; Attendance: 467; Referee: Akkarachai Khanthalee; Assistant referees: Tudsanee Khuanpet, Chayanut Chailoet; Fourth official: Suphanat Yainta
	Penalties
	Phitsanusak Chuenbua-in (penalty scored); Ezike Christian Uchenna (penalty scored); Attaphon Kannoo (penalty scored); Warakorn Poolar (penalty scored); Sarawut Yodyinghathaikul (penalty scored)		(penalty scored) Phutchapong Namsrithan; (penalty scored) Halef Pitbull; (penalty missed) Sittipat Kreearee; (penalty scored) Naruebet Udsa; (penalty scored) Adisak Hantes

24 September 2025	Nakhon Pathom United (T2)	1–0	Chattrakan City (T3)	Mueang, Nakhon Pathom
18:30 (UTC+7)	Sunchai Chaolaokhwan 90+4'	Report; Highlight		Stadium: Stadium of Nakhon Pathom City Municipality Sports School; Attendance: 468; Referee: Kriangkrai Thiphanunjarukorn; Assistant referees: Nissan Janthep, Kittinan Sotorphrphakorn; Fourth official: Wicharn Klinthaworn

24 September 2025	Yala (T3)	4–1	Chanthaburi (T2)	Mueang, Yala
19:00 (UTC+7)	Somprat Reuengnun 17'; Felipe Micael 46', 68'; Isrufan Doromae 86'	Report	Kitti Kinnonkok 70'	Stadium: Stadium of Yala Rajabhat University; Attendance: 200; Referee: Phairot Bunkamnoed; Assistant referees: Tuwae-yusoh Kuji, Thanthon Kongdee; Fourth official: Anon Lohlor

=== First round ===
The first round consists of 64 clubs: 31 winners from the qualification round and 33 clubs that automatically advanced. Among the qualification round winners are 5 clubs from T2, 22 from T3, 1 from TS, and 3 from TA. Joining them are 16 clubs from the 2025–26 Thai League 1, who were granted automatic entry as the top-tier league representatives. Additionally, clubs from other leagues received byes directly to the first round, including 4 clubs from the 2025–26 Thai League 2, 6 clubs from the 2025–26 Thai League 3, 3 clubs from the Thailand Semi-pro League, and 4 clubs from the Thailand Amateur League. The draw for this round took place on 2 October 2025. 141 goals were scored in this round.

29 October 2025	Samui United (T3)	2–0	Bankaeng United (TS)	Ko Samui, Surat Thani
15:00 (UTC+7)	Lucas Massaro Garcia Gama 59'; Teerawat Suban 73' (o.g.)	Report; Highlight		Stadium: Ko Samui City Municipality International Stadium; Attendance: 342; Referee: Yod Damhai; Assistant referees: Mayunai Kueteh, Ameen Puteh; Fourth official: Anantasak Yakoh

29 October 2025	Lopburi City (T3)	2–3	Ratchaburi (T1)	Mueang, Lopburi
15:00 (UTC+7)	Noppakhun Yingbamrung 24'; Vorraseth Saichan 72'	Report; Highlight	Ikhsan Fandi 6', 14', 27'	Stadium: Phra Ramesuan Stadium; Attendance: 190; Referee: Samrit Ritkaew; Assistant referees: Narin Wongprapipak, Arna Rattanabumchum; Fourth official: Natipong Aiemso

29 October 2025	Thonburi Forest (TA)	0–7	Nongbua Pitchaya (T2)	Phra Samut Chedi, Samut Prakan
15:00 (UTC+7)		Report; Highlight	Pakorn Seekaewnit 8', 29', 50'; Thanawut Phochai 45+2' (pen.), 48'; Phanthakan Artsombun 61'; Adisak Waenlor 79'	Stadium: Laemfhapa Subdistrict Municipality Stadium; Attendance: 275; Referee: Putthipong Issising; Assistant referees: Kiadtisak Janmol, Siwat Chaithong; Fourth official: Chaiya Moolmanee

29 October 2025	Nakhon Sawan See Khwae City (T3)	0–1	Pattani (T2)	Mueang, Nakhon Sawan
15:00 (UTC+7)		Report; Highlight	Akrom Mamood 19'	Stadium: Nakhon Sawan Provincial Stadium; Attendance: 24; Referee: Direk Kaort; Assistant referees: Sarayut Sriampri, Nissan Janthep; Fourth official: Peerasan Krataithong

29 October 2025	PSU Surat Thani City (T3)	1–4	Lamphun Warriors (T1)	Mueang, Surat Thani
15:00 (UTC+7)	Osvaldo Nascimento dos Santos Neto 45' (pen.)	Report; Highlight	Peniel Mlapa 26', 65'; Maung Maung Lwin 45+2'; Teerawut Churok 59'	Stadium: Stadium of Prince of Songkla University, Surat Thani Campus; Attendance: 640; Referee: Thapakorn Thongkon; Assistant referees: Tuwae-yusoh Kuji, Yossapon Tongprom; Fourth official: Sapuding Kalong

29 October 2025	Burapha United (T3)	0–4	Port (T1)	Ban Bueng, Chonburi
16:00 (UTC+7)		Report; Highlight	Suphanan Bureerat 7', 48'; Teerasak Poeiphimai 20'; Chanukun Karin 70'	Stadium: Banbueng Town Municipality Stadium; Attendance: 1,256; Referee: Phairot Bunkamnoed; Assistant referees: Apichit Nophuan, Watthana Chonchanakul; Fourth official: Akom Charoensuk

29 October 2025	Customs United (T3)	3–0	Nonthaburi United (T3)	Bang Phli, Samut Prakan
17:00 (UTC+7)	Natdanai Hangnalen 20'; Anumat Seewongkaew 45'; Thanaat Kantheerat 62'	Report; Highlight		Stadium: Stadium of Customs Department, Lad Krabang 54; Attendance: 117; Referee: Piyawat Rittimunee; Assistant referees: Patcharapon Losomsup, Supakorn Ruangrit; Fourth official: Pawarin Chukong

29 October 2025	Chiangrai United (T1)	19–0	Sing Pathum Thani (TA)	Mueang, Chiang Rai
18:00 (UTC+7)	Chinngoen Phutonyong 7', 57'; Banphakit Phrmmanee 20'; Thakdanai Jaihan 21'; Jorge Eduardo Silva Costa 36'; Chinnawat Prachuabmon 38', 39', 50' (pen.), 82'; Piyaphon Phanichakul 58', 69'; Thanawat Pimyotha 59', 64', 75'; Ongsa Singthong 60', 62', 90+3'; Phoptham Pornkod 67'; Nanthiphat Chaiman 85'	Report; Highlight		Stadium: Singha Chiangrai Stadium; Attendance: 205; Referee: Wathanyu Morin; Assistant referees: Srisuwan Boonnum, Pramote Boon-in; Fourth official: Jakkapong Pongpathet

29 October 2025	Chachoengsao Hi-Tek (T3)	0–1	Nakhon Ratchasima Mazda (T1)	Mueang, Chachoengsao
18:00 (UTC+7)		Report; Highlight	Chitsanuphong Phimpsang 5'	Stadium: Chachoengsao Town Municipality Stadium; Attendance: 409; Referee: Sila Jinnigorn; Assistant referees: Rachain Srichai, Waranon Soonsuwan; Fourth official: Pongthep Raipimai

29 October 2025	Kasetsart (T2)	1–2	Nakhon Pathom United (T2)	Chatuchak, Bangkok
18:00 (UTC+7)	Taiga Kitajima 38'	Report; Highlight	Banjong Phadungpattanodom 10'; Nutthapong Chuekamut 90+3'	Stadium: Insee Chantarasatit Stadium; Attendance: 410; Referee: Chaikrit Inboonsong; Assistant referees: Thanet Jairaw, Anucha Pinamon; Fourth official: Kriangkrai Thiphanunjarukorn

29 October 2025	BFB Pattaya City (T3)	1–0	Chiangmai (T3)	Bang Lamung, Chonburi
18:00 (UTC+7)	Abdolreza Zarei 20'	Report; Highlight		Stadium: Nong Prue Stadium; Attendance: 214; Referee: Palathip Homwarn; Assistant referees: Kodcharat Rattanachot, Komsan Wantavee; Fourth official: Ekkalak Muangkhotr

29 October 2025	Sukhothai (T1)	3–1	Yala (T3)	Mueang, Sukhothai
18:00 (UTC+7)	Lursan Thiamrat 18'; Gildo Henrique Malta de Araújo 77'; Apichart Denman 85'	Report; Highlight	Felipe Micael 47' (pen.)	Stadium: Thalay Luang Stadium; Attendance: 1,027; Referee: Woottipong Ketkam; Assistant referees: Worapong Prasartsri, Waranyoo Chomgoson; Fourth official: Sarayut Jakngoen

29 October 2025	Mahasarakham SBT (T2)	1–4	Rayong (T1)	Mueang, Maha Sarakham
18:30 (UTC+7)	Prasittichai Perm 45+4'	Report; Highlight	Seksan Ratree 18', 78'; Stênio Júnior 54' (pen.); Saharat Sontisawat 90+3'	Stadium: Mahasarakham Provincial Stadium; Attendance: 1,144; Referee: Jirawit Phonkaew; Assistant referees: Tanate Chuchuen, Kasama Loyma; Fourth official: Kanoksak Khiaodaeng

29 October 2025	Ayutthaya United (T1)	1–0	Udon United (T3)	Phra Nakhon Si Ayutthaya, Phra Nakhon Si Ayutthaya
18:30 (UTC+7)	Pantakan Kasemkulwirai 45+1'	Report; Highlight		Stadium: Phra Nakhon Si Ayutthaya Provincial Stadium; Attendance: 742; Referee: Kotchapoom Meesridaecha; Assistant referees: Sumate Peasiri, Nuannid Donjangreed; Fourth official: Phadoongkiat Piangdee

29 October 2025	Buriram United (T1)	12–0	Warin Chamrap (TS)	Mueang, Buriram
18:30 (UTC+7)	Fejsal Mulić 21' (pen.), 34', 49'; Thiraphon Phrinphun 26' (o.g.); Ilhan Fandi 39', 45+2'; Athit Berg 67'; Ratthanakorn Maikami 72'; Narubadin Weerawatnodom 75'; Shinnaphat Leeaoh 79'; Thanakrit Chotmuangpak 81', 90'	Report; Highlight		Stadium: Chang Arena; Attendance: 11,413; Referee: Manuschai Chawong; Assistant referees: Nattapong Wadweangcom, Samart Kaikaew; Fourth official: Narinnart Tiamskun

29 October 2025	Kanchanaburi Power (T1)	4–0	Nara United (T3)	Mueang, Kanchanaburi
19:00 (UTC+7)	Alain Oyarzun 51'; Pongpat Liorungrueangkit 72'; Kritsana Kasemkulvilai 88'; Chenrop Samphaodi 90+4' (pen.)	Report; Highlight		Stadium: Kanchanaburi Provincial Stadium; Attendance: 548; Referee: Alongkorn Khonwai; Assistant referees: Chaowalit Poonprasit, Wirot Lokham; Fourth official: Anusorn Nookaew

29 October 2025	Chonburi (T1)	1–1 (a.e.t.) (2–4 p)	Police Tero (T2)	Mueang, Chonburi
19:00 (UTC+7)	Santiphap Channgom 120+1'	Report; Highlight	Ritthidet Phensawat 120+2'	Stadium: Chonburi Daikin Stadium; Attendance: 3,682; Referee: Natee Choosuwan; Assistant referees: Rawut Nakarit, Vichet Getkaew; Fourth official: Komgrit Ponpasit
	Penalties
	Santiphap Channgom (penalty missed); Nattapong Sayriya (penalty scored); Channarong Promsrikaew (penalty scored); Rachata Moraksa (penalty missed)		(penalty scored) Welington Adão Cruz; (penalty scored) Adisak Sosungnoen; (penalty missed) Pichitchai Sienkrthok; (penalty scored) Apichok Seerawong; (penalty scored) Ritthidet Phensawat

29 October 2025	BG Pathum United (T1)	4–0	Kamphaengphet (T3)	Thanyaburi, Pathum Thani
19:00 (UTC+7)	Matheus Fornazari Custódio 3', 50'; Joel López Pissano 59'; Chanathip Songkrasin 84'	Report; Highlight		Stadium: True BG Stadium; Attendance: 5,092; Referee: Kitisak Pikunngoen; Assistant referees: Natthaphon Mala, Sahatnet Deemongkol; Fourth official: Chakrit Siripong

30 October 2025	Prime Bangkok (T3)	0–0 (a.e.t.) (6–5 p)	Khon Kaen (T3)	Lak Si, Bangkok
15:00 (UTC+7)		Report; Highlight		Stadium: NT Stadium; Attendance: 260; Referee: Kittichai Huthip; Assistant referees: Fa-is Sohdalae, Pichaya Kasem; Fourth official: Trin Sahachaipat
	Penalties
	Chawanwit Saelao (penalty scored); Wongsakorn Buasamlee (penalty missed); Aekkaphong Phlmankasemsri (penalty missed); Thanawat Dechkla (penalty scored); Victor Kamhuka (penalty scored); Kittiporn Chueachil (penalty scored); Jiranat Sopaanan (penalty scored); Thanawat Kanyadee (penalty scored)		(penalty missed) Jakkapan Pornsai; (penalty scored) Charin Boodhad; (penalty missed) Nutdanai Ketpaen; (penalty scored) Sarawin Saengra; (penalty scored) John Caio Camargo Silva; (penalty scored) Worawaran Pholuea; (penalty scored) Taweesak Chanlee; (penalty missed) Chakkaphat Phumnuan

30 October 2025	Nongkhai (TA)	0–5	Khon Kaen United (T2)	Mueang, Udon Thani
15:00 (UTC+7)		Report; Highlight	Kim Ji-min 8'; Phanuphong Phonsa 28'; Phongsakon Sangkasopha 45+2', 80', 90+1'	Stadium: Stadium of Thailand National Sports University, Udon Thani Campus; Attendance: 146; Referee: Jarin Yawapee; Assistant referees: Chaiya Sripak, Anupong Sangtopo; Fourth official: Anan Keawmuangkhun

30 October 2025	Bankhai United (T3)	5–0	Nakhon Nayok (TS)	Ban Khai, Rayong
15:00 (UTC+7)	Guttiner 10', 19'; Chinnapat Kaikaew 31', 89'; Pipattanapong Buntom 57'	Report; Highlight		Stadium: Wai Krong Stadium; Attendance: 130; Referee: Pichit Thongjanmoon; Assistant referees: Theerapat Insena, Bukhori Lehnuh; Fourth official: Kittithat Kengketkorn

30 October 2025	Fleet (T3)	1–0	ACDC (T3)	Sattahip, Chonburi
15:00 (UTC+7)	Tiago Chulapa 18'	Report; Highlight		Stadium: Battleship Stadium; Attendance: 72; Referee: Pornpumin Chaiyo; Assistant referees: Sujin Rodart, Pheerapat Yodnak; Fourth official: Pichet Chumcha

30 October 2025	Surin Khong Chee Mool (T3)	2–9	Ubon Kids City (TA)	Mueang, Surin
15:00 (UTC+7)	Poosit Sukreum 18' (pen.); Songyot Boonkhueang 79' (pen.)	Report; Highlight	Manaschai Faktae 3', 34', 55'; Sirisak Fufung 10'; Tanet Saengthong 16', 26', 50'; Bundit Paponpai 36', 60'	Stadium: Stadium of Rajamangala University of Technology Isan, Surin Campus; Attendance: 68; Referee: Patiyut Monthianart; Assistant referees: Yuranan Nukhao, Panuwat Kamba; Fourth official: Yodsakorn Pakdeesuwan

30 October 2025	Marines (T3)	0–3	Sisaket United (T2)	Sattahip, Chonburi
15:00 (UTC+7)		Report; Highlight	Suphaphon Sutthisak 33'; Kwon Dae-hee 47'; Kittipong Wongma 56' (pen.)	Stadium: Sattahip Navy Stadium; Attendance: 150; Referee: Ekkachai Phetcham; Assistant referees: Pakorn Srichumsin, Kittinan Sotorphrphakorn; Fourth official: Suriyo Kanhachalee

30 October 2025	VRN Muangnont (T3)	0–1	Phitsanulok (T3)	Mueang, Nonthaburi
15:00 (UTC+7)		Report; Highlight	Yod Chanthawong 23'	Stadium: Nonthaburi City Municipality Stadium; Attendance: 120; Referee: Watcharasak Intharak; Assistant referees: Puttipong Saensarn, Nattipong Jaimuang; Fourth official: Pornthep Promsopa

30 October 2025	Chiangmai United (T2)	2–6	PT Prachuap (T1)	Mae Rim, Chiang Mai
17:00 (UTC+7)	Athaset Thongnak 67'; Siradanai Saengngam 90+3'	Report; Highlight	Édgar Méndez 5'; Iklas Sanron 29', 71'; Adrian Ugelvik 57'; Tauã 88'; Chaowat Veerachat 90+1'	Stadium: Chiang Mai Rajabhat University 100th Anniversary Sports Center, Mae Rim Campus; Attendance: 1,241; Referee: Sarayut Jakngoen; Assistant referees: Binla Preeda, Sornram Yutim; Fourth official: Doungkaew Doungtawan

30 October 2025	Roi Et 2018 (TA)	2–0	Samut Songkhram City (T3)	Mueang, Roi Et
17:30 (UTC+7)	Rewat Khumbun 40'; Thanakorn Thongchai 62'	Report; Highlight		Stadium: Roi Et Provincial Stadium; Attendance: 480; Referee: Amnat Makklang; Assistant referees: Chinnawat Kaiyasit, Atiwat Yapakdee; Fourth official: Damrong Wangraha

30 October 2025	Uthai Thani (T1)	3–0	Kasem Bundit University (T3)	Mueang, Uthai Thani
18:00 (UTC+7)	Mohamed Eisa 22' (pen.); Marcelo Djaló 68'; Sumanya Purisai 90+5'	Report; Highlight		Stadium: Uthai Thani Provincial Stadium; Attendance: 738; Referee: Peerasan Krataithong; Assistant referees: Poonsawat Samransuk, Pathompong Anunluksanakul; Fourth official: Chaireag Ngam-som

30 October 2025	Mahasarakham SWL (TA)	0–2	Uttaradit (T3)	Mueang, Maha Sarakham
18:00 (UTC+7)		Report; Highlight	Saran Tadtiang 56'; Diego Silva 61'	Stadium: Mahasarakham Provincial Stadium; Attendance: 300; Referee: Sittisak Kaewkam; Assistant referees: Korakit Sonjan, Sutiwat Kaewkhunthong; Fourth official: Suriyawong Ramsri

30 October 2025	Phichit United (T3)	0–0 (a.e.t.) (4–2 p)	Udon Thani City (TA)	Mueang, Phichit
18:00 (UTC+7)		Report; Highlight		Stadium: Phichit Stadium; Attendance: 1,223; Referee: Bongkod Tiansavang; Assistant referees: Suwit Kongtongnok, Chumphon Khiaokhao; Fourth official: Chirawat Chomphoosee
	Penalties
	Michael Arinze Anunobi (penalty scored); Khajonsak Choojit (penalty scored); Amnart Rakprasert (penalty scored); Partchya Katethip (penalty scored)		(penalty scored) Watcharapong Pakpiphruk; (penalty scored) Thanyawat Kaendee; (penalty missed) Thawisak Kidraksa; (penalty missed) Ratipong Pangkhabut

30 October 2025	Bangkok United (T1)	7–0	Samut Sakhon City (T3)	Thanyaburi, Pathum Thani
18:30 (UTC+7)	Everton 25'; Pokklaw Anan 36'; Teerasil Dangda 39', 45'; Wanchai Jarunongkran 56'; Narakhorn Kangkratok 61'; Guntapon Keereeleang 82'	Report; Highlight		Stadium: True BG Stadium; Attendance: 424; Referee: Noppadet Mangngam; Assistant referees: Komsan Kampan, Phubes Lekpha; Fourth official: Phairot Bunkamnoed

30 October 2025	Muangthong United (T1)	10–0	Romklao United (TS)	Pak Kret, Nonthaburi
18:30 (UTC+7)	Sarayut Yoosuebchuea 7', 23', 55'; Kittithach Phadsan 8' (o.g.); Emil Roback 31'; Jaturapat Sattham 35'; Thiraphat Nuntagowat 39'; Kenan Dünnwald-Turan 40'; Payanat Thodsanid 57'; Arthit Bua-ngam 76'	Report; Highlight		Stadium: Thunderdome Stadium; Attendance: 892; Referee: Komgrit Ponpasit; Assistant referees: Rachan Dawangpa, Supawan Hinthong; Fourth official: Natee Choosuwan

=== Second round ===
The second round consists of 32 clubs, all securing victories in the first round. This stage features 15 clubs from the T1, 6 clubs from the T2, 9 clubs from the T3, and 2 clubs from the TA. The draw for this round took place on 20 November 2025. 54 goals were scored in this round.

20 December 2025	Bankhai United (T3)	1–3 (a.e.t.)	Nakhon Pathom United (T2)	Ban Khai, Rayong
18:00 (UTC+7)	Francisco Jadson Silva do Nascimento 9'	Report; Highlight	Taiga Matsunaga 34', 118'; Pheemphapob Viriyachanchai 110'	Stadium: Wai Krong Stadium; Referee: Chaiya Moolmanee; Assistant referees: Sahatnet Deemongkol, Kiadtisak Janmol; Fourth official: Narit Mungtoemklang

20 December 2025	Ayutthaya United (T1)	6–0	Roi Et 2018 (TA)	Phra Nakhon Si Ayutthaya, Phra Nakhon Si Ayutthaya
18:00 (UTC+7)	Sanrawat Dechmitr 45+1'; Passakorn Biaothungnoi 47'; Verot Pombuppha 52'; Diego Carioca 64', 65'; Anucha Sakaekum 82' (pen.)	Report; Highlight		Stadium: Phra Nakhon Si Ayutthaya Provincial Stadium; Attendance: 1,205; Referee: Veeraporn Maophaeo; Assistant referees: Phubes Lekpha, Vichet Getkaew; Fourth official: Kotchapoom Meesridaecha

20 December 2025	Phitsanulok (T3)	1–2	Ratchaburi (T1)	Mueang, Phitsanulok
18:00 (UTC+7)	Burnel Okana-Stazi 76'	Report; Highlight	Denílson 90+3'; Thossawat Limwannasathian 90+6'	Stadium: Phitsanulok PAO. Stadium; Attendance: 808; Referee: Sarayut Jakngoen; Assistant referees: Worapong Prasartsri, Sumate Peasiri; Fourth official: Chaireag Ngam-som

20 December 2025	Phichit United (T3)	2–3	Chiangrai United (T1)	Mueang, Phichit
18:00 (UTC+7)	Michael Arinze Anunobi 27', 67'	Report; Highlight	Marco Ballini 5'; Itsuki Enomoto 13'; Banphakit Phrmmanee 60'	Stadium: Phichit Stadium; Attendance: 815; Referee: Chaikrit Inboonsong; Assistant referees: Waranyoo Chomgoson, Srisuwan Boonnum; Fourth official: Komgrit Ponpasit

20 December 2025	Uthai Thani (T1)	0–1	PT Prachuap (T1)	Mueang, Uthai Thani
18:30 (UTC+7)		Report; Highlight	Tauã 90+1'	Stadium: Uthai Thani Provincial Stadium; Attendance: 1,568; Referee: Pawara Seejen; Assistant referees: Natthaphon Mala, Wirot Lokham; Fourth official: Woottipong Ketkam

20 December 2025	Sukhothai (T1)	3–0	Nongbua Pitchaya (T2)	Mueang, Sukhothai
18:30 (UTC+7)	Romeu Martins de Resende 15'; Gildo Henrique Malta de Araújo 53'; Thiti Thumporn 69'	Report; Highlight		Stadium: Thalay Luang Stadium; Attendance: 886; Referee: Noppadet Mangngam; Assistant referees: Chaowalit Poonprasit, Nonthanan Khanthawong; Fourth official: Sila Jinnigorn

20 December 2025	Kanchanaburi Power (T1)	0–0 (a.e.t.) (4–2 p)	Police Tero (T2)	Mueang, Kanchanaburi
19:00 (UTC+7)		Report; Highlight		Stadium: Kanchanaburi Provincial Stadium; Attendance: 1,094; Referee: Mongkolchai Pechsri; Assistant referees: Rachain Srichai, Narin Wongprapipak; Fourth official: Thapakorn Thongkon
	Penalties
	Aboubakar Kamara (penalty scored); Chenrop Samphaodi (penalty scored); Kritsana Kasemkulvilai (penalty missed); Pongpat Liorungrueangkit (penalty scored); Mohamed Mara (penalty scored)		(penalty missed) Songkhramsamut Namphueng; (penalty missed) Veeraphong Aon-pean; (penalty scored) Apichok Seerawong; (penalty scored) Sphon Noiwong

20 December 2025	Muangthong United (T1)	0–1	Lamphun Warriors (T1)	Pak Kret, Nonthaburi
19:00 (UTC+7)		Report; Highlight	Willen 15'	Stadium: Thunderdome Stadium; Attendance: 2,472; Referee: Panumas Phansamo; Assistant referees: Chaiya Sripak, Banpot Khunhong; Fourth official: Natee Choosuwan

21 December 2025	Prime Bangkok (T3)	3–2	Fleet (T3)	Lak Si, Bangkok
15:00 (UTC+7)	Teerapong Malai 4'; Chawanwit Saelao 12', 47'	Report; Highlight	Rafael Galhardo 40'; Chatri Rattanawong 49'	Stadium: NT Stadium; Attendance: 485; Referee: Kriangkrai Thiphanunjarukorn; Assistant referees: Jagkrit Kaenkaew, Kattiya Saphu; Fourth official: Worapon Sanjan

21 December 2025	Samui United (T3)	1–3 (a.e.t.)	Khon Kaen United (T2)	Ko Samui, Surat Thani
15:00 (UTC+7)	Lucas Massaro Garcia Gama 45+2'	Report; Highlight	Phongsakon Sangkasopha 58'; Phanuphong Phonsa 120+1'; Amadou Ouattara 120+2'	Stadium: Ko Samui City Municipality International Stadium; Attendance: 485; Referee: Jiraphan Yodphut; Assistant referees: Tuwae-yusoh Kuji, Yossapon Tongprom; Fourth official: Ameen Lorma

21 December 2025	Uttaradit (T3)	1–0 (a.e.t.)	BFB Pattaya City (T3)	Mueang, Uttaradit
15:00 (UTC+7)	Luan Santos 99'	Report; Highlight		Stadium: Uttaradit Provincial Stadium; Attendance: 357; Referee: Supat Chaingam; Assistant referees: Surasak Phoomiwanna, Natthawut Tasmak; Fourth official: Chirawat Chomphoosee

21 December 2025	Customs United (T3)	1–5	Buriram United (T1)	Bang Phli, Samut Prakan
17:00 (UTC+7)	Aitsara Suktaeng 6'	Report; Highlight	Guilherme Bissoli 75', 78', 90+2'; Suphanat Mueanta 82'; Thanakrit Chotmuangpak 90+7'	Stadium: Stadium of Customs Department, Lad Krabang 54; Attendance: 1,785; Referee: Akom Charoensuk; Assistant referees: Kasama Loyma, Binla Preeda; Fourth official: Kitisak Pikunngoen

21 December 2025	Sisaket United (T2)	1–0	Rayong (T1)	Mueang, Sisaket
18:00 (UTC+7)	Fellipe Cabral Veloso dos Santos 10'	Report; Highlight		Stadium: Sri Nakhon Lamduan Stadium; Attendance: 823; Referee: Winat Phophat; Assistant referees: Watthana Chonchanakul, Rachan Dawangpa; Fourth official: Manuschai Chawong

21 December 2025	BG Pathum United (T1)	10–0	Ubon Kids City (TA)	Thanyaburi, Pathum Thani
18:00 (UTC+7)	Sanchai Nontasila 5', 40'; Matheus Fornazari Custódio 19', 52'; Chatmongkol Thongkiri 55'; Thiraphat Puetong 66'; Surachat Sareepim 71', 89'; Itthimon Tippanet 85'; Siwakorn Ponsan 90'	Report; Highlight		Stadium: True BG Stadium; Attendance: 5,423; Referee: Alongkorn Khonwai; Assistant referees: Pattarapong Kijsathit, Anucha Pinamon; Fourth official: Phairot Bunkamnoed

21 December 2025	Pattani (T2)	2–0	Nakhon Ratchasima Mazda (T1)	Mueang, Pattani
19:00 (UTC+7)	Felipe Nunes 81'; Marlon Henrique Brandão da Silva 88'	Report; Highlight		Stadium: Pattani PAO. Stadium; Attendance: 8,325; Referee: Songkran Bunmeekiart; Assistant referees: Chotrawee Tongduang, Kantrakorn Ngaosri; Fourth official: Suriyo Kanhachalee

21 December 2025	Port (T1)	0–3 (awd.)	Bangkok United (T1)	Khlong Toei, Bangkok
19:00 (UTC+7)				Stadium: PAT Stadium; Attendance: 3,092; Referee: Peerasan Krataithong; Assistant referees: Tanate Chuchuen, Komsan Kampan; Fourth official: Wicharn Klinthaworn

=== Third round ===
The third round consists of 16 clubs, all securing victories in the second round. This stage features 10 clubs from the T1, 4 clubs from the T2, and 2 clubs from the T3. The draw for this round took place on 25 December 2025. 25 goals were scored in this round.

14 January 2026	Prime Bangkok (T3)	2–3 (a.e.t.)	Chiangrai United (T1)	Lak Si, Bangkok
17:00 (UTC+7)	Noppakhun Yingbamrung 57'; Nontawat Rakaok 79'	Report; Highlight	Sanukran Thinjom 40', 55'; Marco Ballini 109'	Stadium: NT Stadium; Attendance: 509; Referee: Kitisak Pikunngoen; Assistant referees: Phongsiri Chusi, Mongkhon Kaisin; Fourth official: Wutthinan Jampawai

14 January 2026	Bangkok United (T1)	3–1	Kanchanaburi Power (T1)	Thanyaburi, Pathum Thani
18:00 (UTC+7)	Thitiphan Puangchan 24'; Muhsen Al-Ghassani 30'; Everton 62'	Report; Highlight	Aboubakar Kamara 49'	Stadium: True BG Stadium; Attendance: 1,069; Referee: Mongkolchai Pechsri; Assistant referees: Chotrawee Tongduang, Nuannid Donjangreed; Fourth official: Veeraporn Maophaeo

14 January 2026	Buriram United (T1)	4–0	Pattani (T2)	Mueang, Buriram
18:00 (UTC+7)	Guilherme Bissoli 45', 64', 88'; Rubén Sánchez 76'	Report; Highlight		Stadium: Chang Arena; Attendance: 18,015; Referee: Jirawit Phonkaew; Assistant referees: Tanate Chuchuen, Chaiya Sripak; Fourth official: Methas Kumarasit

14 January 2026	Sisaket United (T2)	1–3	Ratchaburi (T1)	Mueang, Sisaket
18:00 (UTC+7)	Wongsakorn Saenruecha 78'	Report; Highlight	Jakkaphan Kaewprom 6'; Jaroensak Wonggorn 26'; Chotipat Poomkaew 74'	Stadium: Sri Nakhon Lamduan Stadium; Attendance: 969; Referee: Kotchapoom Meesridaecha; Assistant referees: Rachan Dawangpa, Kriangsak Pimsanit; Fourth official: Natee Choosuwan

14 January 2026	Lamphun Warriors (T1)	2–0	Sukhothai (T1)	Mueang, Lamphun
18:30 (UTC+7)	Mohammed Osman 20', 87'	Report; Highlight		Stadium: Lamphun Warriors Stadium; Attendance: 902; Referee: Sarayut Jakngoen; Assistant referees: Apichit Nophuan, Watthana Chonchanakul; Fourth official: Woottipong Ketkam

14 January 2026	Khon Kaen United (T2)	2–0	Nakhon Pathom United (T2)	Mueang, Khon Kaen
18:30 (UTC+7)	Felipe Amorim 17'; Chitsanupong Choti 90+2'	Report; Highlight		Stadium: Khon Kaen PAO. Stadium; Attendance: 1,017; Referee: Komgrit Ponpasit; Assistant referees: Binla Preeda, Chaowalit Poonprasit; Fourth official: Anan Keawmuangkhun

14 January 2026	Ayutthaya United (T1)	3–0	Uttaradit (T3)	Phra Nakhon Si Ayutthaya, Phra Nakhon Si Ayutthaya
19:00 (UTC+7)	Conrado 34' (pen.); Kritsana Kasemkulvilai 39'; Nattapon Worasut 85'	Report; Highlight		Stadium: Phra Nakhon Si Ayutthaya Provincial Stadium; Attendance: 1,361; Referee: Noppadet Mangngam; Assistant referees: Natthaphon Mala, Wirot Lokham; Fourth official: Chaireag Ngam-som

14 January 2026	PT Prachuap (T1)	1–0	BG Pathum United (T1)	Mueang, Prachuap Khiri Khan
19:00 (UTC+7)	Michel 73'	Report; Highlight		Stadium: Sam Ao Stadium; Attendance: 2,570; Referee: Satchukorn Saenchu; Assistant referees: Pattarapong Kijsathit, Srisuwan Boonnum; Fourth official: Chaikrit Inboonsong

=== Quarter-finals ===
The quarter-finals consist of 8 clubs, all securing victories in the third round. This stage features 7 clubs from the T1 and 1 club from the T2. The draw for this round took place on 27 January 2026. 11 goals were scored in this round.

25 February 2026	Lamphun Warriors (T1)	2–1 (a.e.t.)	Bangkok United (T1)	Mueang, Lamphun
18:00 (UTC+7)	Anan Yodsangwal 43'; Peniel Mlapa 102'	Report; Highlight	Rivaldinho 30'	Stadium: Lamphun Warriors Stadium; Attendance: 548; Referee: Peerasan Krataithong; Assistant referees: Chaowalit Poonprasit, Sumate Peasiri; Fourth official: Panumas Phansamo

25 February 2026	Buriram United (T1)	6–0	Khon Kaen United (T2)	Mueang, Buriram
18:00 (UTC+7)	Robert Žulj 39', 45+4', 60'; Emmanuel Toku 45+5', 89'; Nathakorn Rattanasuwan 67'	Report; Highlight		Stadium: Chang Arena; Attendance: 10,292; Referee: Chaikrit Inboonsong; Assistant referees: Chaiya Sripak, Kasama Loyma; Fourth official: Seksan Phansri

25 February 2026	Chiangrai United (T1)	0–1	PT Prachuap (T1)	Mueang, Chiang Rai
18:30 (UTC+7)		Report; Highlight	Michel 7' (pen.)	Stadium: Singha Chiangrai Stadium; Attendance: 200; Referee: Kotchapoom Meesridaecha; Assistant referees: Chotrawee Tongduang, Binla Preeda; Fourth official: Pawara Seejen

25 February 2026	Ayutthaya United (T1)	1–0	Ratchaburi (T1)	Phra Nakhon Si Ayutthaya, Phra Nakhon Si Ayutthaya
18:30 (UTC+7)	Jesse Curran 35' (o.g.)	Report; Highlight		Stadium: Phra Nakhon Si Ayutthaya Provincial Stadium; Attendance: 1,892; Referee: Veeraporn Maophaeo; Assistant referees: Pattarapong Kijsathit, Worapong Prasartsri; Fourth official: Wiwat Jumpaoon

=== Semi-finals ===
The semi-finals consist of 4 clubs, all from the T1. These clubs progressed to this stage after winning their respective matches in the quarter-finals. The draw for this round took place on 20 April 2026. 6 goals were scored in this round.

17 May 2026	Buriram United (T1)	5–0	Ayutthaya United (T1)	Khlong Toei, Bangkok
19:00 (UTC+7)	Sandy Walsh 17', 41'; Kingsley Schindler 63'; Supachai Chaided 71'; Robert Žulj 81'	Report; Highlight		Stadium: PAT Stadium; Attendance: 2,819; Referee: Sivakorn Pu-udom; Assistant referees: Apichit Nophuan, Chotrawee Tongduang; Fourth official: Kotchapoom Meesridaecha

17 May 2026	PT Prachuap (T1)	1–0	Lamphun Warriors (T1)	Bang Yai, Nonthaburi
19:00 (UTC+7)	Bernardo Vilar 74'	Report; Highlight		Stadium: Nonthaburi Stadium; Attendance: 1,237; Referee: Torphong Somsing; Assistant referees: Rachain Srichai, Natthaphon Mala; Fourth official: Veeraporn Maophaeo

=== Final ===
The final consists of 2 clubs, both from the T1. These clubs progressed to this stage after winning their respective matches in the semi-finals. 1 goal was scored in this round.

31 May 2026	Buriram United (T1)	1–0 (a.e.t.)	PT Prachuap (T1)	Khlong Luang, Pathum Thani
19:00 (UTC+7)	Robert Žulj 94'	Report; Highlight		Stadium: Thammasat Stadium; Attendance: 13,213; Referee: Torphong Somsing; Assistant referees: Pattarapong Kijsathit, Natthaphon Mala; Fourth official: Chaireag Ngam-som

== Tournament statistics ==
=== Top goalscorers ===
Rank	Player	Club	Goals
1	(Nigeria) Aliu Micheal Abdul	Samui United	7
2	(Brazil) Guilherme Bissoli	Buriram United	6
3	(Austria) Robert Žulj	Buriram United	5
3	(Thailand) Tanet Saengthong	Ubon Kids City	5
5	(Brazil) Matheus Fornazari Custódio	BG Pathum United	4
5	(Thailand) Chinnawat Prachuabmon	Chiangrai United	4
5	(Thailand) Phongsakon Sangkasopha	Khon Kaen United	4
5	(Thailand) Thanawut Phochai	Nongbua Pitchaya	4
5	(Thailand) Amarin Chaisuesat	Samui United	4

=== Hat-tricks ===
Player	For	Against	Result	Date	Round
(Thailand) Sattawat Yanjinda	Marines (T3)	Muang Klaeng (TA)	13–0 (A)	24 September 2025	Qualification round
(Thailand) Thanyapat Thanawut	Marines (T3)	Muang Klaeng (TA)	13–0 (A)	24 September 2025	Qualification round
(Thailand) Teerawat Durnee	PSU Surat Thani City (T3)	APD United (TA)	9–0 (H)	24 September 2025	Qualification round
(Thailand) Thanadon Yankaew	Samui United (T3)	Nakhon Pathom City (TA)	20–0 (H)	24 September 2025	Qualification round
(Nigeria) Aliu Micheal Abdul^{7}	Samui United (T3)	Nakhon Pathom City (TA)	20–0 (H)	24 September 2025	Qualification round
(Thailand) Amarin Chaisuesat^{4}	Samui United (T3)	Nakhon Pathom City (TA)	20–0 (H)	24 September 2025	Qualification round
(Ghana) Eric Kumi	Lopburi City (T3)	Nakhon Phanom United (TS)	5–1 (A)	24 September 2025	Qualification round
(Singapore) Ikhsan Fandi	Ratchaburi (T1)	Lopburi City (T3)	3–2 (A)	29 October 2025	First round
(Thailand) Pakorn Seekaewnit	Nongbua Pitchaya (T2)	Thonburi Forest (TA)	7–0 (A)	29 October 2025	First round
(Thailand) Chinnawat Prachuabmon^{4}	Chiangrai United (T1)	Sing Pathum Thani (TA)	19–0 (H)	29 October 2025	First round
(Thailand) Thanawat Pimyotha	Chiangrai United (T1)	Sing Pathum Thani (TA)	19–0 (H)	29 October 2025	First round
(Thailand) Ongsa Singthong	Chiangrai United (T1)	Sing Pathum Thani (TA)	19–0 (H)	29 October 2025	First round
(Serbia) Fejsal Mulić	Buriram United (T1)	Warin Chamrap (TS)	12–0 (H)	29 October 2025	First round
(Thailand) Phongsakon Sangkasopha	Khon Kaen United (T2)	Nongkhai (TA)	5–0 (A)	30 October 2025	First round
(Thailand) Tanet Saengthong	Ubon Kids City (TA)	Surin Khong Chee Mool (T3)	9–2 (A)	30 October 2025	First round
(Thailand) Manaschai Faktae	Ubon Kids City (TA)	Surin Khong Chee Mool (T3)	9–2 (A)	30 October 2025	First round
(Thailand) Sarayut Yoosuebchuea	Muangthong United (T1)	Romklao United (TS)	10–0 (H)	30 October 2025	First round
(Brazil) Guilherme Bissoli	Buriram United (T1)	Customs United (T3)	5–1 (A)	21 December 2025	Second round
(Brazil) Guilherme Bissoli	Buriram United (T1)	Pattani (T2)	4–0 (H)	14 January 2026	Third round
(Austria) Robert Žulj	Buriram United (T1)	Khon Kaen United (T2)	6–0 (H)	25 February 2026	Quarter-finals

Notes: ^{7} = Player scored 7 goals; ^{4} = Player scored 4 goals; (H) = Home team; (A) = Away team

== See also ==
- 2025–26 Thai League 1
- 2025–26 Thai League 2
- 2025–26 Thai League 3
- 2025–26 Thai League 3 Northern Region
- 2025–26 Thai League 3 Central Region
- 2025–26 Thai League 3 Northeastern Region
- 2025–26 Thai League 3 Eastern Region
- 2025–26 Thai League 3 Western Region
- 2025–26 Thai League 3 Southern Region
- 2025–26 Thai League 3 National Championship
- 2026 Thailand Semi-pro League
- 2025–26 Thai League Cup
- 2025 Thai U21 League
