= 2023 Thailand Semi-pro League =

1st season of the Thailand Semi-pro League

- Season: 2023
- Dates: 4 February 2023 – 27 August 2023
- Champions: Satun
- Promoted: Khelang United (Northern region); Suranaree Army 2 (Northeastern region); Prachinburi City (Eastern region); Banfootball Pattaya (Eastern region) (Note: Due to the promotion of Chanthaburi and Pattaya Dolphins United in the 2022–23 Thai League 3 Eastern region, there must be 2 teams in the 2023 Thailand Semi-pro League Eastern region promoted to replace them.); Thap Luang United (Western region); Satun (Southern region) (Note: Because there is no competition in the Southern region of the 2023 Thailand Semi-pro League, the right to promotion goes to the winner of the 2023 Thailand Amateur League Southern region.); The iCON RSU (Bangkok Metropolitan region)

The 2023 Thailand Semi-pro League is the inaugural season of the Thailand Semi-pro League, serving as the official fourth tier of the Thai football league system. The league is organized by the Football Association of Thailand (FA Thailand) and managed by Thai League Co., Ltd. Sponsored by PTT Lubricants, the competition is officially known as the PTT Lubricants Semi-pro League for sponsorship purposes.

A total of 34 clubs participated in the competition, divided into five regional zones: Northern, Northeastern, Eastern, Western, and Bangkok Metropolitan. The competition consisted of a Regional Stage followed by the National Championship Stage, with the regional champions earning promotion to Thai League 3 for the following season and competing for the national title.

== Stadiums and locations ==
=== Northern region ===
Team	Location	Stadium	Coordinates
Chiangmai Country	Chiang Mai (Doi Saket)	Stadium of Rajamangala University of Technology Lanna, Doi Saket Campus	18°51′28″N 99°10′39″E
Chiangrai TSC	Chiang Rai (Mueang)	Stadium of Chiang Rai Rajabhat University	19°59′26″N 99°51′00″E
Khelang United	Lampang (Mueang)	Stadium of Lampang Rajabhat University	18°14′07″N 99°29′22″E
Nakhon Sawan	Nakhon Sawan (Mueang)	Nakhon Sawan Provincial Stadium	15°42′36″N 100°06′26″E
Phichit United	Phichit (Mueang)	Phichit Stadium	16°26′35″N 100°19′26″E

=== Northeastern region ===
Team	Location	Stadium	Coordinates
FC Korat	Nakhon Ratchasima (Mueang)	Stadium of Suranaree University of Technology	14°53′17″N 102°01′01″E
Hi-Tech Chaiyaphum United	Chaiyaphum (Mueang)	Stadium of Thailand National Sports University, Chaiyaphum Campus	15°48′29″N 102°01′05″E
Kalasin United	Kalasin (Mueang)	Kalasin Provincial Stadium	16°25′02″N 103°31′13″E
Pitchaya Bundit College	Nong Bua Lamphu (Mueang)	Nong Bua Lamphu Provincial Stadium	17°07′48″N 102°25′26″E
Sisaket City	Sisaket (Mueang)	Stadium of Sisaket Rajabhat University	15°07′10″N 104°21′22″E
Suranaree Army 2	Nakhon Ratchasima (Mueang)	Stadium of Fort Suranaree	14°57′59″N 102°05′58″E
Ubon Kids City	Ubon Ratchathani (Warin Chamrap)	Stadium of Ubon Ratchathani University	15°07′36″N 104°55′04″E
Ubon Poly	Ubon Ratchathani (Mueang)	UMT Stadium	15°15′49″N 104°50′35″E
Udon Banjan United	Udon Thani (Mueang)	Udon Thani SAT Stadium	17°26′54″N 102°54′59″E
Vongchavalitkul University	Nakhon Ratchasima (Mueang)	Stadium of Vongchavalitkul University	15°00′14″N 102°06′50″E

=== Eastern region ===
Team	Location	Stadium	Coordinates
Angsila	Chonburi (Mueang)	Saensuk Town Municipality Stadium	13°18′05″N 100°55′22″E
Banbueng City	Chonburi (Ban Bueng)	Banbueng Town Municipality Stadium	13°19′06″N 101°06′59″E
Banfootball Pattaya	Chonburi (Si Racha)	Si Racha Town Municipality Stadium	13°10′20″N 100°55′41″E
Nakhon Nayok	Nakhon Nayok (Mueang)	Nakhon Nayok PAO. Stadium	14°12′52″N 101°10′45″E
Padriew City	Chachoengsao (Mueang)	Chachoengsao Provincial Stadium	13°42′07″N 101°02′44″E
Prachinburi City	Prachinburi (Mueang)	Prachinburi PAO. Stadium	14°03′52″N 101°22′30″E
Sakaeo Hitech Technology	Sa Kaeo (Mueang)	Sa Kaeo PAO. Stadium	13°46′21″N 102°10′43″E

=== Western region ===
Team	Location	Stadium	Coordinates
Ayothaya Warrior	Phra Nakhon Si Ayutthaya (Phra Nakhon Si Ayutthaya)	Stadium of Rajamangala University of Technology Suvarnabhumi, Huntra Campus	14°22′35″N 100°36′23″E
Lopburi United	Lopburi (Mueang)	Jaifah Academy Stadium	14°48′53″N 100°46′05″E
Pakchong SCK	Saraburi (Muaklek)	Stadium of National Sports Training Center, Muaklek	14°37′41″N 101°10′06″E
Singburi Bangrajun	Singburi (Mueang)	Singburi PAO. Stadium	14°53′40″N 100°24′39″E
Thap Luang United	Nakhon Pathom (Kamphaeng Saen)	Stadium of Kasetsart University, Kamphaeng Saen Campus	14°01′55″N 99°59′22″E

=== Bangkok Metropolitan region ===
Team	Location	Stadium	Coordinates
Bangkapi	Bangkok (Sai Mai)	Grakcu Sai Mai Stadium	13°53′54″N 100°37′46″E
BSL United	Samut Prakan (Bang Phli)	Stadium of Verso International School	13°37′56″N 100°44′01″E
EGY Thai	Pathum Thani (Khlong Luang)	Stadium of Bangkok University	14°02′19″N 100°36′08″E
Hippo	Bangkok (Bang Bon)	84th Anniversary Stadium, Bang Bon	13°38′40″N 100°23′51″E
Minburi City	Bangkok (Lat Krabang)	Stadium of King Mongkut's Institute of Technology Ladkrabang	13°43′49″N 100°46′20″E
Sathorn UTK	Bangkok (Sathon)	Stadium of Rajamangala University of Technology Krungthep	13°42′48″N 100°32′13″E
The iCON RSU	Bangkok (Lak Si)	NT Stadium	13°53′03″N 100°34′37″E

=== Southern region (National championship stage) ===
Team	Location	Stadium	Coordinates
Satun	Satun (Mueang)	Satun PAO. Stadium	6°39′05″N 100°04′44″E

== Regional stage ==
The number of teams in 5 regions including 5 teams in the Northern region, 10 teams in the Northeastern region, 7 teams in the Eastern region, 5 teams in the Western region, and 7 teams in the Bangkok metropolitan region.

=== Northern region ===
League table

Pos	Team	Pld	W	D	L	GF	GA	GD	Pts	Promotion or qualification
1	Khelang United (Q, P)	8	5	3	0	19	6	+13	18	Promotion to 2023–24 Thai League 3 and qualification to the National Championship stage
2	Phichit United	8	5	2	1	25	10	+15	17	
3	Nakhon Sawan	8	3	3	2	21	15	+6	12	
4	Chiangrai TSC	8	1	2	5	9	28	−19	5	
5	Chiangmai Country	8	0	2	6	6	21	−15	2	

Source: Thai League
Rules for classification: 1) Points; 2) Head-to-head points; 3) Head-to-head goal difference; 4) Head-to-head goal scored; 5) Overall goal difference; 6) Overall goal scored; 7) Fair play points; 8) Play-off without extra time).
(P) Promoted; (Q) Qualified for the phase indicated

Results

Home \ Away	CMC	CRT	KLU	NSW	PCU
Chiangmai Country	—	1–4	0–3	1–2	0–1
Chiangrai TSC	1–1	—	1–4	0–5	1–2
Khelang United	2–2	4–0	—	3–1	1–1
Nakhon Sawan	4–0	2–2	1–1	—	5–5
Phichit United	4–1	9–0	0–1	3–1	—

Source: Thai League
Legend: Blue = home team win; Yellow = draw; Red = away team win.
For upcoming matches, an "a" indicates there is an article about the rivalry between the two participants.

=== Northeastern region ===
League table

Pos	Team	Pld	W	D	L	GF	GA	GD	Pts	Promotion or qualification
1	Suranaree Army 2 (Q, P)	9	6	2	1	13	5	+8	20	Promotion to 2023–24 Thai League 3 and qualification to the National Championship stage
2	Ubon Poly	9	5	3	1	23	7	+16	18	
3	Sisaket City	9	5	1	3	19	10	+9	16	
4	Hi-Tech Chaiyaphum United	9	4	1	4	10	14	−4	13	
5	Udon Banjan United	9	2	6	1	9	10	−1	12 (Note: The mini-league record; Udon Banjan United 2 pts (GD -1), Pitchaya Bundit College 2 pts (GD -2), Ubon Kids City 2 pts (GD -3).)	
6	Pitchaya Bundit College	9	3	3	3	7	9	−2	12	
7	Ubon Kids City	9	3	3	3	16	19	−3	12	
8	Kalasin United	9	2	3	4	11	14	−3	9 (Note: The head-to-head record is tied; Kalasin United 1 pt (GD -3), Vongchavalitkul University 1 pt (GD -5). Kalasin United is ahead on the overall goals difference.)	
9	Vongchavalitkul University	9	2	3	4	8	13	−5	9	
10	FC Korat	9	0	1	8	5	20	−15	1	

Source: Thai League
Rules for classification: 1) Points; 2) Head-to-head points; 3) Head-to-head goal difference; 4) Head-to-head goal scored; 5) Overall goal difference; 6) Overall goal scored; 7) Fair play points; 8) Play-off without extra time).
(P) Promoted; (Q) Qualified for the phase indicated
Notes:

Results

Home \ Away	KRT	CPU	KLU	PBC	SKC	SA2	UKC	UBP	UBJ	VCU
FC Korat	—	0–1	—	0–1	—	0–0	—	0–2	—	1–3
Hi-Tech Chaiyaphum United	—	—	—	0–1	1–0	1–2	2–4	—	—	—
Kalasin United	4–1	1–4	—	—	0–0	—	—	—	1–1	0–0
Pitchaya Bundit College	—	—	1–4	—	2–1	0–1	0–0	—	0–0	—
Sisaket City	4–2	—	—	—	—	1–0	7–1	3–1	—	2–1
Suranaree Army 2	—	—	1–0	—	—	—	2–1	1–1	4–1	—
Ubon Kids City	4–1	—	2–1	—	—	—	—	—	2–2	0–0
Ubon Poly	—	6–0	4–0	1–1	—	—	4–2	—	—	4–0
Udon Banjan United	1–0	0–0	—	—	2–1	—	—	0–0	—	—
Vongchavalitkul University	—	0–1	—	2–1	—	0–2	—	—	2–2	—

Source: Thai League
Legend: Blue = home team win; Yellow = draw; Red = away team win.
For upcoming matches, an "a" indicates there is an article about the rivalry between the two participants.

=== Eastern region ===
League table

Pos	Team	Pld	W	D	L	GF	GA	GD	Pts	Promotion or qualification
1	Prachinburi City (Q, P)	6	5	0	1	11	4	+7	15	Promotion to 2023–24 Thai League 3 and qualification to the National Championship stage
2	Banfootball Pattaya (P)	6	4	1	1	10	4	+6	13	Promotion to 2023–24 Thai League 3
3	Padriew City	6	4	0	2	12	6	+6	12	
4	Sakaeo Hitech Technology	6	2	1	3	6	7	−1	7	
5	Angsila	6	1	3	2	8	13	−5	6	
6	Nakhon Nayok	6	1	1	4	8	12	−4	4	
7	Banbueng City	6	0	2	4	3	12	−9	2	

Source: Thai League
Rules for classification: 1) Points; 2) Head-to-head points; 3) Head-to-head goal difference; 4) Head-to-head goal scored; 5) Overall goal difference; 6) Overall goal scored; 7) Fair play points; 8) Play-off without extra time).
(P) Promoted; (Q) Qualified for the phase indicated

Results

Home \ Away	ASL	BBC	BFB	NNY	PRC	PCC	SHT
Angsila	—	—	—	1–7	—	2–0	2–2
Banbueng City	1–1	—	—	—	1–3	—	0–1
Banfootball Pattaya	1–1	2–0	—	—	2–1	—	—
Nakhon Nayok	—	1–1	0–3	—	0–4	—	—
Padriew City	2–1	—	—	—	—	1–2	1–0
Prachinburi City	—	4–0	2–0	1–0	—	—	—
Sakaeo Hitech Technology	—	—	0–2	2–0	—	1–2	—

Source: Thai League
Legend: Blue = home team win; Yellow = draw; Red = away team win.
For upcoming matches, an "a" indicates there is an article about the rivalry between the two participants.

=== Western region ===
League table

Pos	Team	Pld	W	D	L	GF	GA	GD	Pts	Promotion or qualification
1	Thap Luang United (Q, P)	8	5	3	0	13	7	+6	18	Promotion to 2023–24 Thai League 3 and qualification to the National Championship stage
2	Singburi Bangrajun	8	3	4	1	12	9	+3	13	
3	Pakchong SCK	8	2	3	3	12	12	0	9	
4	Ayothaya Warrior	8	2	2	4	10	14	−4	8	
5	Lopburi United	8	0	4	4	4	9	−5	4	

Source: Thai League
Rules for classification: 1) Points; 2) Head-to-head points; 3) Head-to-head goal difference; 4) Head-to-head goal scored; 5) Overall goal difference; 6) Overall goal scored; 7) Fair play points; 8) Play-off without extra time).
(P) Promoted; (Q) Qualified for the phase indicated

Results

Home \ Away	AYW	LBU	PCS	SBJ	TLU
Ayothaya Warrior	—	2–1	3–2	1–1	1–2
Lopburi United	1–1	—	0–2	0–1	0–1
Pakchong SCK	4–1	0–0	—	2–2	1–1
Singburi Bangrajun	2–1	1–1	2–0	—	1–1
Thap Luang United	1–0	1–1	3–1	3–2	—

Source: Thai League
Legend: Blue = home team win; Yellow = draw; Red = away team win.
For upcoming matches, an "a" indicates there is an article about the rivalry between the two participants.

=== Bangkok Metropolitan region ===
League table

Pos	Team	Pld	W	D	L	GF	GA	GD	Pts	Promotion or qualification
1	The iCON RSU (Q, P)	6	5	0	1	12	4	+8	15 (Note: The iCON RSU ahead on the head-to-head points record; The iCON RSU 3 pts, EGY Thai 0 pts.)	Promotion to 2023–24 Thai League 3 and qualification to the National Championship stage
2	EGY Thai	6	5	0	1	16	2	+14	15	
3	Bangkapi	6	3	2	1	4	3	+1	11	
4	Sathorn UTK	6	2	1	3	7	12	−5	7	
5	Minburi City	6	1	3	2	7	7	0	6	
6	BSL United	6	1	0	5	5	15	−10	3	
7	Hippo	6	0	2	4	2	10	−8	2	

Source: Thai League
Rules for classification: 1) Points; 2) Head-to-head points; 3) Head-to-head goal difference; 4) Head-to-head goal scored; 5) Overall goal difference; 6) Overall goal scored; 7) Fair play points; 8) Play-off without extra time).
(P) Promoted; (Q) Qualified for the phase indicated
Notes:

Results

Home \ Away	BKP	BSU	EGT	HPO	MBC	STU	ICR
Bangkapi	—	—	—	0–0	0–0	—	1–0
BSL United	0–1	—	0–3	2–1	—	—	—
EGY Thai	3–1	—	—	3–0	—	—	0–1
Hippo	—	—	—	—	0–0	1–2	0–3
Minburi City	—	5–2	0–2	—	—	0–0	—
Sathorn UTK	0–1	4–1	0–5	—	—	—	—
The iCON RSU	—	1–0	—	—	3–2	4–1	—

Source: Thai League
Legend: Blue = home team win; Yellow = draw; Red = away team win.
For upcoming matches, an "a" indicates there is an article about the rivalry between the two participants.

== National Championship stage ==
The national championship stage is the next stage from the regional stage. 1st place of each zone and 1st place of Southern region of Thailand Amateur League qualified for this stage by being featured in 2 groups. Teams from the Northern, Northeastern, and Eastern regions would have qualified for the upper group. Meanwhile, teams from the Western and Bangkok Metropolitan regions and Southern region of Thailand Amateur League would have qualified for the lower group.

=== Group stage ===
==== Upper region ====
Pos	Team	Pld	W	D	L	GF	GA	GD	Pts	Qualification	KLU	PCC	SA2
1	Khelang United (Q)	2	1	1	0	3	2	+1	4	Qualification to the final	—	—	2–2
2	Prachinburi City	2	1	0	1	1	1	0	3		0–1	—	—
3	Suranaree Army 2	2	0	1	1	2	3	−1	1		—	0–1	—

Source: Thai League
Rules for classification: 1) Points; 2) Head-to-head points; 3) Goal difference; 4) Goals scored;).
(Q) Qualified for the phase indicated
5 August 2023
15:30 UTC+7

Khelang United	2–2	Suranaree Army 2
Nattawat Suwan 3'; Mathas Kajaree 21'	Report; Highlight	Kittisak Roekyamdee 49'; Supawat Homjum 60'

Stadium of Lampang Rajabhat University,
Mueang, Lampang
Attendance: 286
Referee: Suchart Kuisue (Thailand)

13 August 2023
15:30 UTC+7

Suranaree Army 2	0–1	Prachinburi City
	Report	Weerachai Paencokesung 74'

Stadium of Suranaree University of Technology,
Mueang, Nakhon Ratchasima
Attendance: 250
Referee: Vitsawa Nanchana (Thailand)

19 August 2023
15:30 UTC+7

Prachinburi City	0–1	Khelang United
	Report; Highlight	Mathas Kajaree 90+6'

Nakhon Nayok PAO. Stadium,
Mueang, Nakhon Nayok
Attendance: 550
Referee: Palathip Homwarn (Thailand)

==== Lower region ====
Pos	Team	Pld	W	D	L	GF	GA	GD	Pts	Qualification	STN	ICR	TLU
1	Satun (Q)	2	2	0	0	7	3	+4	6	Qualification to the final	—	—	4–1
2	The iCON RSU	2	1	0	1	3	3	0	3		2–3	—	—
3	Thap Luang United	2	0	0	2	1	5	−4	0		—	0–1	—

Source: Thai League
Rules for classification: 1) Points; 2) Head-to-head points; 3) Goal difference; 4) Goals scored;).
(Q) Qualified for the phase indicated
5 August 2023
15:30 UTC+7

Thap Luang United	0–1	The iCON RSU
	Report; Highlight	Apiwat Chuprai 77'

Stadium of Kasetsart University, Kamphaeng Saen Campus,
Kamphaeng Saen, Nakhon Pathom
Attendance:
Referee: Kittichai Huthip (Thailand)

13 August 2023
15:30 UTC+7

The iCON RSU	2–3	Satun
Supakhom Khongdee 41'; Wissanu Sutthi 52'	Report; Highlight	Akrom Mamood 15'; Kittisak Sadeen 63'; Jeong Jin-yeong 66'

Stadium of Bangkok University,
Khlong Luang, Pathum Thani
Attendance:
Referee: Pichit Thongjanmoon (Thailand)

19 August 2023
15:30 UTC+7

Satun	4–1	Thap Luang United
Douglas Mineiro 17'; Akrom Mamood 19', 24', 83'	Report	Siwa Pikulhom 77'

Satun PAO. Stadium,
Mueang, Satun
Attendance: 1,560
Referee: Matoha Sayo (Thailand)

=== Final ===
Team 1	Score	Team 2
Khelang United	3–3 (a.e.t.) (3–5 p)	Satun

27 August 2023
18:00 UTC+7

Khelang United	3–3 (a.e.t.)	Satun
Mathas Kajaree 9', 90+3' (pen.); Nattawat Suwan 90+5'	Report; Highlight	Akkhadet Suksiri 28'; Douglas Mineiro 31'; Chamsuddeen Shoteng 49'
Penalties
Boonkerd Chaiyasin (penalty scored); Panuwat Sripao (penalty scored); Phuwadet Buasika (penalty scored); Siwakorn Pingwongsa (penalty missed)	3–5	(penalty scored) Chamsuddeen Shoteng; (penalty scored) Tayachit Palawan; (penalty scored) Chaiya Nakkaree; (penalty scored) Akrom Mamood; (penalty scored) Ibrohem Ardum

Nonthaburi Stadium,
Bang Yai, Nonthaburi
Attendance: 200
Referee: Pongtut Ananta-art (Thailand)

Khelang United	Satun

Lineups:
GK	22	(Thailand) Nattapon Junlanan
RB	27	(Thailand) Peerapat Chaisongkram
CB	95	(Thailand) Sakda Moonmeuang			(substituted off) 46'
CB	6	(Thailand) Panupong Jatimoon
CB	5	(Thailand) Sirom Gardsrinuch
LB	23	(Thailand) Ponathip Jaimol			(substituted off) 104'
RM	20	(Thailand) Prathchanok Tamool			(substituted off) 60'
CM	25	(Thailand) Phatcharapong Intha			(substituted off) 46'
CM	35	(Thailand) Visit Donard		(yellow card) 55'
LM	7	(Thailand) Mathas Kajaree	9', 90+3' (pen.)		(substituted off) 106'
CF	9	(Thailand) Apisit Prakhongpan (c)		(yellow card) 10'	(substituted off) 68'
Substitutes:
GK	88	(Thailand) Chayanan Khamphala
DF	2	(Thailand) Thanyathon Fongkawee
MF	8	(Thailand) Nattawat Suwan	90+5'		(substituted on) 46'
MF	12	(Thailand) Siwakorn Pingwongsa			(substituted on) 104'
MF	13	(Thailand) Kritsada Phanngam
MF	19	(Thailand) Kritsada Taiwong			(substituted on) 68'
MF	21	(Thailand) Phuwadet Buasika			(substituted on) 60'
FW	4	(Thailand) Panuwat Sripao		(yellow card) 111'	(substituted on) 106'
FW	10	(Thailand) Boonkerd Chaiyasin			(substituted on) 46'
Head Coach:
(Thailand) Sirichai Chaiwiset

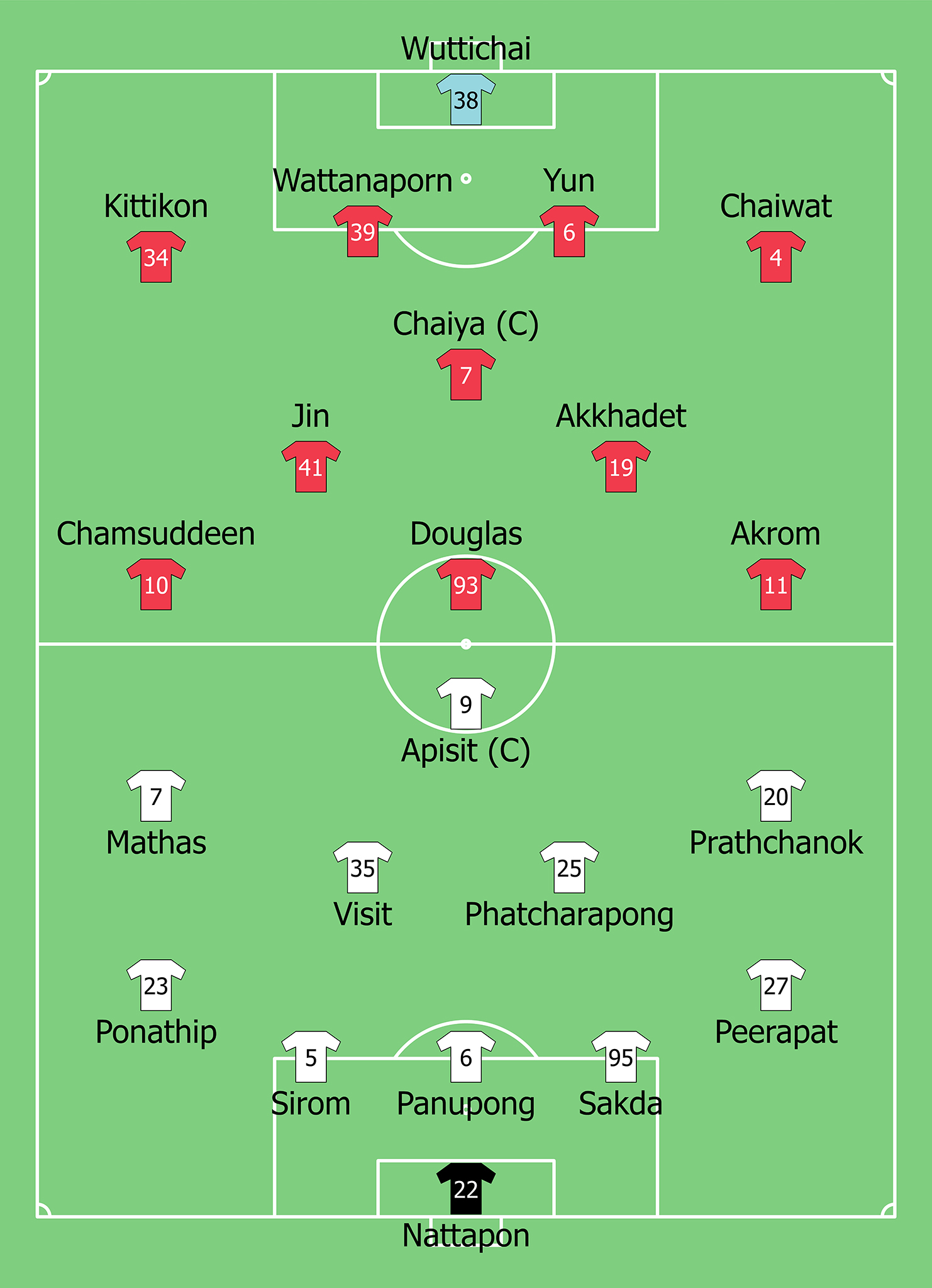

Lineups:
GK	38	(Thailand) Wuttichai Panboot		(yellow card) 45+2'
RB	34	(Thailand) Kittikon Khetpara
CB	39	(Thailand) Wattanaporn Donmngkan			(substituted off) 81'
CB	6	(South Korea) Hyeon Seung-yun		(yellow card) 68'	(substituted off) 115'
LB	4	(Thailand) Chaiwat Pairot			(substituted off) 73'
DM	7	(Thailand) Chaiya Nakkaree (c)
CM	41	(South Korea) Jeong Jin-yeong		(yellow card) 57'	(substituted off) 63'
CM	19	(Thailand) Akkhadet Suksiri	28'		(substituted off) 73'
RF	10	(Thailand) Chamsuddeen Shoteng	49'
CF	93	(Brazil) Douglas Mineiro	31'		(substituted off) 81'
LF	11	(Thailand) Akrom Mamood
Substitutes:
GK	18	(Thailand) Surasak Thong-aon
DF	3	(Thailand) Porawat Taovato			(substituted on) 115'
DF	16	(Thailand) Charudet Yara			(substituted on) 81'
DF	35	(Thailand) Natthaphon Hehna			(substituted on) 73'
MF	8	(Thailand) Ibrohem Ardum		(yellow card) 90+1'	(substituted on) 73'
MF	15	(Thailand) Tayachit Palawan			(substituted on) 63'
MF	20	(Thailand) Rocheedee Satsuk
MF	36	(Thailand) Sulkiplee Jisahwat
FW	44	(Thailand) Kittiphong Khetpara			(substituted on) 81'
Head Coach:
(Thailand) Tawatchai Thonghuad

Assistant referees:
(Thailand) Ritthiphong Phimpapan
(Thailand) Phattarapon Racha
Fourth official:
(Thailand) Trin Sahachaipat
Match Commissioner:
(Thailand) Prakit Yenvorn
Referee Assessor:
(Thailand) Surin Khakhao
General Coordinator:
(Thailand) Jakkrit Chaiyaroek

== See also ==
- 2022–23 Thai League 1
- 2022–23 Thai League 2
- 2022–23 Thai League 3
- 2022–23 Thai League 3 Northern Region
- 2022–23 Thai League 3 Northeastern Region
- 2022–23 Thai League 3 Eastern Region
- 2022–23 Thai League 3 Western Region
- 2022–23 Thai League 3 Southern Region
- 2022–23 Thai League 3 Bangkok Metropolitan Region
- 2022–23 Thai League 3 National Championship
- 2022–23 Thai FA Cup
- 2022–23 Thai League Cup
- 2022 Thailand Champions Cup
