= 2025–26 Thai League 3 Northern Region =

Thai League 3 Northern Region
- Season: 2025–26
- Dates: 13 September 2025 – 21 March 2026
- Champions: Uttaradit
- Relegated: Nakhon Sawan See Khwae City
- T3 National Championship: Uttaradit; Chiangmai
- Matches: 132
- Goals: 348 (2.64 per match)
- Top goalscorer: (Thailand) Tanawit Kamjoi (14 goals; Chiangrai TSC)
- Best goalkeeper: (Thailand) Itthipon Kamsuprom (9 clean sheets; Uttaradit) (Thailand) Pathomtat Sudprasert (9 clean sheets; Maejo United)
- Biggest home win: 7 goals difference Uttaradit 8–1 Chiangrai City (1 February 2026); Uttaradit 7–0 Phitsanulok (22 February 2026)
- Biggest away win: 5 goals difference Nakhon Sawan See Khwae City 0–5 Chiangmai (14 March 2026); Kamphaengphet 1–6 Uttaradit (15 March 2026)
- Highest scoring: 9 goals Uttaradit 8–1 Chiangrai City (1 February 2026)
- Longest winning run: 5 matches Uttaradit; Phichit United
- Longest unbeaten run: 16 matches Uttaradit
- Longest winless run: 13 matches Phitsanulok
- Longest losing run: 5 matches Chattrakan City
- Highest attendance: 2,685; Phichit United 1–3 Uttaradit (28 February 2026)
- Lowest attendance: 22; Nakhon Sawan See Khwae City 0–5 Chiangmai (14 March 2026)
- Total attendance: 73,512
- Average attendance: 557

The 2025–26 Thai League 3 Northern Region was part of the 2025–26 Thai League 3 Regional Stage, consisting of 12 clubs located across the northern region of Thailand, including some areas in the upper parts of the central and western regions. The season commenced on 13 September 2025, with clubs competing in a round-robin format featuring home-and-away matches. The Regional Stage concluded on 21 March 2026, with the top two clubs advancing to the National Championship Stage, while the bottom-placed club was relegated to the Thailand Semi-pro League for the following season.

== Seasonal Changes ==
The 2025–26 Thai League 3 season features a number of changes compared to the previous campaign. These include the promotion and relegation of clubs between divisions, several club renamings and rebrandings, and the introduction of a new title sponsor, BYD Auto, which rebranded the competition as the BYD Dolphin League III for sponsorship reasons.

=== Promotions from Thailand Semi-pro League ===
Normally, the champions of each of the six regional groups of the 2025 Thailand Semi-pro League would be promoted to the Thai League 3. However, in the Western region, the champions, The Wall, failed club licensing and were denied promotion. As a result, only five regional champions earned direct promotion, with several additional clubs promoted under special quotas due to licensing issues and adjustments to balance the number of teams in each group. Clubs promotion in the Northern region:

- Phichit United – promoted as regional champions.
- Chiangrai TSC – promoted as runners-up under a special quota, increasing the Northern group from 11 to 12 clubs.

=== Club relegated due to finishing last in the region ===
- Phitsanulok Unity relegated after finishing last in the Northern table.

=== Sponsorship and Broadcasting ===
In the 2025–26 season, Thai League 3 will operate under a title sponsorship arrangement for the first time: BYD Auto (through BYD Rêver Thailand) has become the main sponsor for all three professional tiers in Thailand, including Thai League 3, rebranding it as the BYD Dolphin League III.

On the broadcasting side, a landmark media rights deal was struck, giving AIS Play (in partnership with Gulf and JAS) exclusive rights to stream all matches from Thai Leagues 1, 2, and 3, plus domestic cups and youth competitions for the 2025–26 through 2028–29 seasons. Under this agreement, Thai League 3 matches can be watched live for free via AIS Play, and fans will no longer rely solely on individual clubs' streaming efforts (e.g., via YouTube or Facebook), as they did in previous seasons.

=== Club name and logo changes ===
3 clubs have rebranded or changed their logos for the 2025–26 season of the Thai League 3 Northern region:

- Chiangmai, introduced a new logo for the 2025–26 season. The previous crest, which featured a half-body tiger with the Three Kings above, was replaced by a modern design showing the metallic head of a roaring steel tiger next to a football, with the traditional Three Kings motif removed.
- Phichit United, newly promoted from the Thailand Semi-pro League, introduced a minor update to their existing crocodile-themed emblem. The crest continues to depict a muscular crocodile from the chest upward, in a half-portrait style. For the 2025–26 season, the design was modified by adding the Thai letter "ธ" on the crocodile's chest and updating the founding year displayed at the bottom from "2021" to "2025".
- Uttaradit, previously known as TPF Uttaradit, officially changed their club name to "Uttaradit". The club retained its existing crest design, but the lettering within the emblem was updated: the abbreviation "TPF" was replaced with "UTTFC". All other visual elements of the logo remain unchanged.

== Teams ==
=== Number of teams by province ===
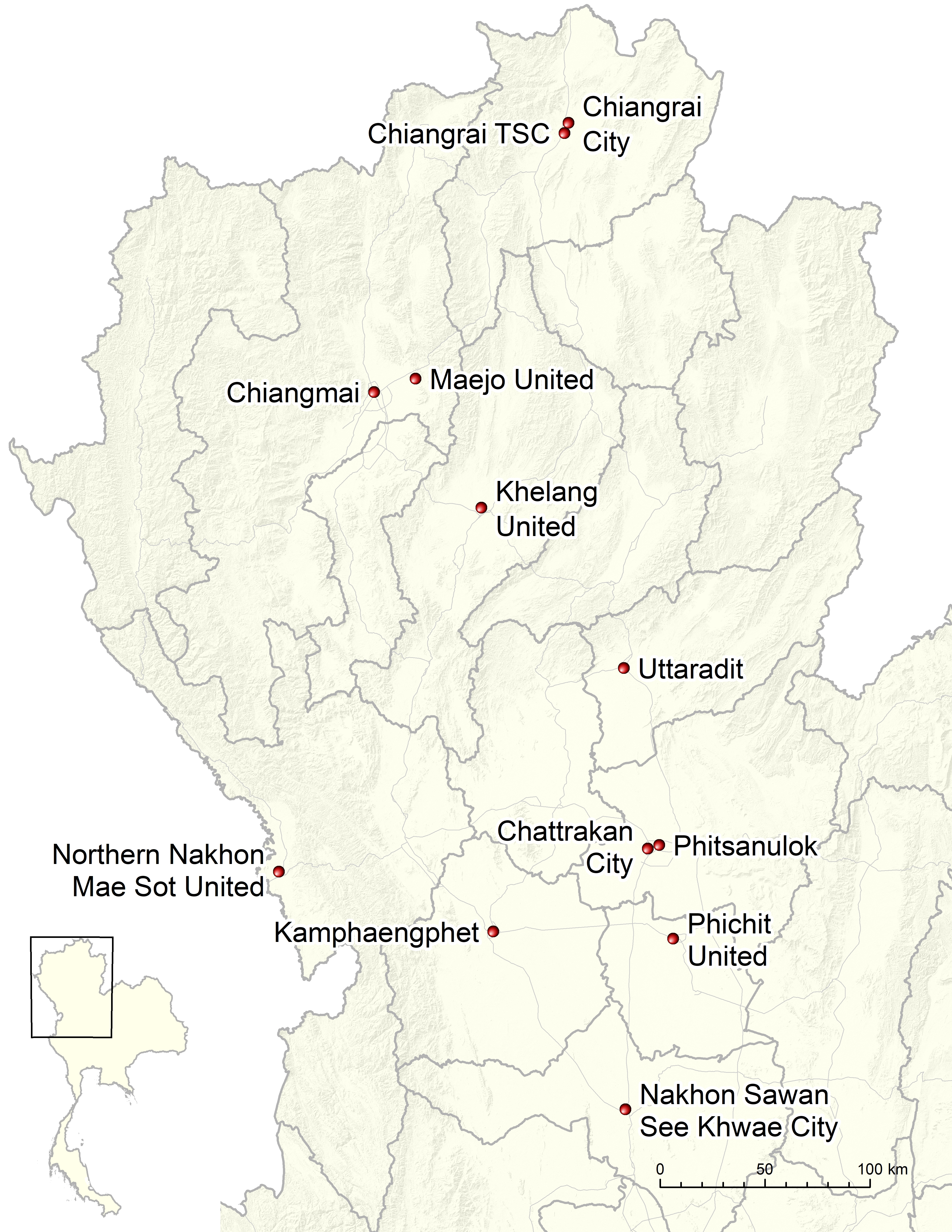
Locations of the 2025–26 Thai League 3 Northern Region clubs.

Position	Province	Number	Teams
1	Chiang Mai	2	Chiangmai and Maejo United
1	Chiang Rai	2	Chiangrai City and Chiangrai TSC
1	Phitsanulok	2	Chattrakan City and Phitsanulok
4	Kamphaeng Phet	1	Kamphaengphet
4	Lampang	1	Khelang United
4	Nakhon Sawan	1	Nakhon Sawan See Khwae City
4	Phichit	1	Phichit United
4	Tak	1	Northern Nakhon Mae Sot United
4	Uttaradit	1	Uttaradit

=== Stadiums and locations ===
Team	Location	Stadium	Coordinates
Chattrakan City	Phitsanulok (Mueang)	Stadium of Pibulsongkram Rajabhat University	16°49′55″N 100°12′47″E
Chiangmai	Chiang Mai (Mueang)	Chiangmai City Municipality Stadium	18°48′03″N 98°59′22″E
Chiangrai City	Chiang Rai (Mueang)	Singha Chiangrai Stadium	19°57′25″N 99°52′29″E
Chiangrai TSC	Chiang Rai (Mueang)	Chiangrai Provincial Stadium	19°54′48″N 99°51′21″E
Kamphaengphet	Kamphaengphet (Mueang)	Cha Kung Rao Stadium	16°28′40″N 99°31′17″E
Khelang United	Lampang (Mueang)	Lampang Provincial Stadium	18°18′09″N 99°28′25″E
Maejo United	Chiang Mai (Doi Saket)	Stadium of Rajamangala University of Technology Lanna, Doi Saket Campus	18°51′28″N 99°10′39″E
Nakhon Sawan See Khwae City	Nakhon Sawan (Mueang)	Nakhon Sawan Provincial Stadium	15°42′36″N 100°06′26″E
Northern Nakhon Mae Sot United	Tak (Mae Sot)	Five Border Districts Stadium	16°44′07″N 98°33′52″E
Phichit United	Phichit (Mueang)	Phichit Stadium	16°26′35″N 100°19′26″E
Phitsanulok	Phitsanulok (Mueang)	Phitsanulok PAO. Stadium	16°50′48″N 100°15′51″E
Uttaradit	Uttaradit (Mueang)	Uttaradit Provincial Stadium	17°36′34″N 100°06′39″E

=== Foreign players ===
A T3 team could register 3 foreign players from foreign players all around the world. A team can use 3 foreign players on the field in each game.

Note :
(substituted off) : players who released during second leg transfer window;
(substituted on) : players who registered during second leg transfer window.

AFC member countries players.
CAF member countries players.
CONCACAF member countries players.
CONMEBOL member countries players.
OFC member countries players.
UEFA member countries players.
No foreign player registered.

Club	Leg	Player 1	Player 2	Player 3
Chattrakan City	1st	(Ivory Coast) Diarra Junior Aboubacar (substituted off)	(Nigeria) Chijindu Sunday Edmund (substituted off)	(Japan) Masahiro Fujiwara
Chattrakan City	2nd	(Nigeria) Opeyaemi Korede Ajayi (substituted on)	(Saint Kitts and Nevis) Tishan Tajahni Hanley (substituted on)	(Japan) Masahiro Fujiwara
Chiangmai	1st	(Russia) Daniil Musatkin (substituted off)	(Republic of Ireland) John McGuigan (substituted off)	(Nigeria) Ezike Christian Uchenna (substituted off)
Chiangmai	2nd		(Brazil) Luan Borges Machado Martins (substituted on)	(Brazil) Efrain Rintaro (substituted on)
Chiangrai City	1st		(Cameroon) Bilanyu Yinyu Tarlishi (substituted off)	(South Korea) Kim Seong-soo
Chiangrai City	2nd	(South Korea) Jung Seung-yeon (substituted on)	(Australia) Matthew James Zanon (substituted on)	(South Korea) Kim Seong-soo
Chiangrai TSC	1st
Chiangrai TSC	2nd
Kamphaengphet	1st	(Brazil) Rayner Moraes Costa (substituted off)	(United States) Dylan Nathanael Ramos	(South Korea) Choi Jeong-soo
Kamphaengphet	2nd	(France) Geoffroy Dylan Bienvenu Letienne (substituted on)	(United States) Dylan Nathanael Ramos	(South Korea) Choi Jeong-soo
Khelang United	1st	(Ghana) Isaac Quansah (substituted off)	(China) Liu Chaoyang (substituted off)	(Brazil) Yuri Martins Roque
Khelang United	2nd	(Brazil) Rayner Moraes Costa (substituted on)	(Japan) Taku Hishida (substituted on)	(Brazil) Yuri Martins Roque
Maejo United	1st	(Brazil) Douglas Mineiro	(Nigeria) Precious Uchenna Eze	(Nigeria) Bright Friday
Maejo United	2nd	(Brazil) Douglas Mineiro	(Nigeria) Precious Uchenna Eze	(Nigeria) Bright Friday
Nakhon Sawan See Khwae City	1st	(Republic of the Congo) Katuala Joslyn Ghifem (substituted off)	(Australia) Likassa Firaol Bayu (substituted off)	(South Korea) So Ji-hoon
Nakhon Sawan See Khwae City	2nd	(Nigeria) Riliwan Omolaja Okedara (substituted on)	(Nigeria) Uche Vincent Egbuhuzor (substituted on)	(South Korea) So Ji-hoon
Northern Nakhon Mae Sot United	1st	(Cameroon) Cedrick Platini Kaham	(Cameroon) Tewidikum Tah Nivan	(Nigeria) Mubarak Mohammed Ahmed
Northern Nakhon Mae Sot United	2nd	(Cameroon) Cedrick Platini Kaham	(Cameroon) Tewidikum Tah Nivan	(Nigeria) Mubarak Mohammed Ahmed
Phichit United	1st	(Brazil) Gustavo Henrique Balduino Ribeiro (substituted off)	(Brazil) Abraão de Sousa Lima (substituted off)	(Nigeria) Michael Arinze Anunobi
Phichit United	2nd	(Ivory Coast) Boubacar Koné (substituted on)	(Liberia) Moussa Sanoh (substituted on)	(Nigeria) Michael Arinze Anunobi
Phitsanulok	1st	(South Korea) Lee Myeong-jin (substituted off)	(Argentina) Juan Francisco Odorisio	(Republic of the Congo) Burnel Okana-Stazi
Phitsanulok	2nd	(Togo) Ekue Andre Houma (substituted on)	(Argentina) Juan Francisco Odorisio	(Republic of the Congo) Burnel Okana-Stazi
Uttaradit	1st	(Ghana) Oscar Plape (substituted off)	(Brazil) Luan Santos	(Brazil) Diego Silva
Uttaradit	2nd	(Brazil) Lucas Gaudencio Moraes (substituted on)	(Brazil) Luan Santos	(Brazil) Diego Silva

== League table ==
=== Standings ===
Pos	Team	Pld	W	D	L	GF	GA	GD	Pts	Qualification or relegation
1	Uttaradit (C, Q)	22	12	9	1	55	15	+40	45	Qualification to the National Championship stage
2	Chiangmai (Q)	22	12	6	4	41	24	+17	42	Qualification to the National Championship stage
3	Phichit United	22	9	7	6	39	29	+10	34	
4	Khelang United	22	10	3	9	30	29	+1	33	
5	Northern Nakhon Mae Sot United	22	7	11	4	25	20	+5	32	
6	Maejo United	22	8	7	7	24	21	+3	31	
7	Phitsanulok	22	7	9	6	24	29	−5	30	
8	Chiangrai TSC	22	7	6	9	29	31	−2	27 (Note: Chiangrai TSC ahead on head-to-head record; Chiangrai TSC 3 pts (GD +1), Chattrakan City 3 pts (GD -1).)	
9	Chattrakan City	22	7	6	9	17	22	−5	27	
10	Chiangrai City	22	6	6	10	28	44	−16	24	
11	Kamphaengphet	22	5	4	13	17	36	−19	19	
12	Nakhon Sawan See Khwae City (R)	22	4	2	16	19	48	−29	14	Relegation to the Thailand Semi-pro League

Source: Thai League
Rules for classification: 1) Points; 2) Head-to-head points; 3) Head-to-head goal difference; 4) Head-to-head goal scored; 5) Overall goal difference; 6) Overall goal scored; 7) Fair play points; 8) Play-off without extra time).
(C) Champions; (Q) Qualified for the phase indicated; (R) Relegated

=== Positions by round ===
Team ╲ Round	1	2	3	4	5	6	7	8	9	10	11	12	13	14	15	16	17	18	19	20	21	22
Uttaradit	5	1	2	3	2	3	3	3	2	2	2	2	2	2	2	2	2	2	2	1	1	1
Chiangmai	2	5	5	4	3	2	1	1	1	1	1	1	1	1	1	1	1	1	1	2	2	2
Phichit United	8	8	9	6	10	8	8	7	10	8	9	7	4	3	3	3	3	3	3	4	3	3
Khelang United	1	4	6	8	6	4	4	4	7	7	6	8	5	6	4	6	6	5	5	5	5	4
Northern Nakhon Mae Sot United	3	6	3	5	5	7	6	6	6	6	7	6	3	5	6	5	5	6	6	7	6	5
Maejo United	7	7	8	11	9	10	10	10	4	4	5	4	6	4	5	4	4	4	4	3	4	6
Phitsanulok	6	3	1	2	1	1	2	2	3	3	4	3	7	7	7	7	9	9	8	8	8	7
Chiangrai TSC	4	2	4	1	4	5	5	5	5	5	3	5	8	8	8	9	8	8	9	9	9	8
Chattrakan City	10	10	12	12	12	12	12	12	12	12	12	11	11	11	9	8	7	7	7	6	7	9
Chiangrai City	12	9	10	7	8	6	9	8	8	9	8	9	9	10	11	10	11	11	10	10	10	10
Kamphaengphet	11	11	11	9	7	9	7	9	9	10	10	10	10	9	10	11	10	10	11	11	11	11
Nakhon Sawan See Khwae City	9	12	7	10	11	11	11	11	11	11	11	12	12	12	12	12	12	12	12	12	12	12

Source: Thai League
= Qualification to the National Championship stage; = Relegation to the Thailand Semi-pro League

=== Results by round ===
Team ╲ Round	1	2	3	4	5	6	7	8	9	10	11	12	13	14	15	16	17	18	19	20	21	22
Uttaradit	W	W	D	D	D	D	W	D	W	D	W	W	D	D	W	D	L	W	W	W	W	W
Chiangmai	W	D	D	W	D	W	W	W	W	D	W	W	W	D	W	L	L	D	W	L	W	L
Phichit United	L	D	D	W	L	W	D	D	L	D	D	W	W	W	W	W	L	D	L	L	W	W
Khelang United	W	D	L	L	W	W	L	D	L	D	W	L	W	L	W	L	W	W	L	L	W	W
Northern Nakhon Mae Sot United	W	D	W	D	D	L	D	D	D	W	L	D	W	D	L	W	D	D	D	L	W	W
Maejo United	L	D	D	L	W	L	W	D	W	W	L	D	D	W	L	W	D	W	D	W	L	L
Phitsanulok	W	W	W	L	W	D	D	D	L	D	L	D	L	D	D	L	D	L	W	W	D	W
Chiangrai TSC	W	W	L	W	L	D	L	D	D	W	D	L	L	L	D	D	W	L	L	W	L	W
Chattrakan City	L	L	L	L	L	D	D	L	L	D	W	W	D	W	W	W	W	D	D	W	L	L
Chiangrai City	L	D	D	W	D	W	L	D	D	L	W	L	L	L	L	W	L	L	W	W	D	L
Kamphaengphet	L	L	D	W	W	L	W	L	D	L	L	D	L	W	L	L	W	L	D	L	L	L
Nakhon Sawan See Khwae City	L	L	W	L	L	L	L	W	W	L	L	L	D	L	L	L	D	W	L	L	L	L

Source: Thai League
W = Won; D = Drawn; L = Lost

=== Results ===
Home \ Away	CTC	CMI	CRC	CRT	KPP	KLU	MJU	NSK	NMS	PCU	PLK	UTD
Chattrakan City	—	0–0	0–1	2–1	2–0	1–1	0–0	0–0	0–2	0–0	1–1	0–2
Chiangmai	2–1	—	1–1	2–3	1–0	2–1	1–0	3–2	3–0	1–2	3–0	1–1
Chiangrai City	1–3	0–3	—	4–3	0–1	1–4	1–1	2–1	1–3	3–3	1–1	2–2
Chiangrai TSC	3–1	1–2	1–1	—	3–1	1–2	1–0	1–0	0–1	1–3	0–0	1–1
Kamphaengphet	1–0	1–1	1–0	0–2	—	2–0	0–1	1–2	1–1	0–1	1–1	1–6
Khelang United	0–1	2–3	1–0	1–1	0–1	—	2–1	1–0	3–0	2–2	3–1	1–0
Maejo United	2–0	1–0	3–1	3–0	2–1	1–2	—	1–0	1–1	4–1	0–1	2–2
Nakhon Sawan See Khwae City	3–1	0–5	0–2	2–3	3–2	0–3	0–0	—	1–3	1–3	0–1	1–4
Northern Nakhon Mae Sot United	0–1	0–0	0–1	1–0	2–2	3–0	0–0	2–0	—	1–1	0–0	1–1
Phichit United	1–2	2–4	4–2	0–0	3–0	1–0	4–0	6–1	1–1	—	0–0	1–3
Phitsanulok	0–1	2–2	0–2	3–2	2–0	4–1	3–1	0–2	2–2	2–0	—	0–0
Uttaradit	1–0	4–1	8–1	1–1	3–0	3–0	0–0	4–0	1–1	1–0	7–0	—

Source: Thai League
Legend: Blue = home team win; Yellow = draw; Red = away team win.
For upcoming matches, an "a" indicates there is an article about the rivalry between the two participants.
