= Udon Banjan United F.C. =

Udon Banjan United อุดร บ้านจั่น ยูไนเต็ด
- Full name: Udon Banjan United Football Club
- Nicknames: The Flame of the Forest Warriors (ดอกจานพิฆาต)
- Founded: 2019; 7 years ago
- Ground: Main Stadium of Thailand National Sports University, Udon Thani Campus; Udon Thani, Thailand
- Capacity: 1,000
- Coordinates: 17°24′20″N 102°46′09″E
- Owner(s): Udonbanjanfootballclub United Co., Ltd.
- Chairman: Jakarin Leonoraset
- Head coach: Attapong Siripak
- League: Thai League 3
- 2025–26: Thai League 3, 8th of 12 in the Northeastern region
- Website: Facebook

Udon Banjan United Football Club (Thai: สโมสรฟุตบอล อุดร บ้านจั่น ยูไนเต็ด), is a Thai professional football club based in Udon Thani, Thailand. The club currently competes in the Thai League 3, the third tier of the Thai football league system, and plays in the Northeastern region.

The club is affiliated with Pitchaya Bundit College, a private higher education institution in Nong Bua Lamphu, sharing the same network as Nongbua Pitchaya F.C., who competes in the Thai League 2, Udon United F.C. in Thai League 3 and Pitchaya Bundit College F.C., in the Thailand Semi-pro League.

== History ==
Udon Banjan United Football Club was founded in 2019 in Udon Thani, Thailand. Although established as a football club, it did not participate in any professional league during its initial years due to the COVID-19 pandemic. The club made its competitive debut in the 2022 Thailand Amateur League, a fourth-tier amateur competition organized by the Football Association of Thailand that served as a pathway for promotion to Thai League 3. However, Udon Banjan United was unable to achieve promotion in its first season.

In 2023, the structure of Thailand's lower leagues was reorganized. The Thailand Amateur League became a membership-preserving competition for clubs not yet ready to turn professional, while the newly established Thailand Semi-pro League was designated as the fourth-tier competition, requiring participating teams to meet Club Licensing criteria. Udon Banjan United applied and competed in the 2023 Thailand Semi-pro League, but was again unable to secure promotion. The club continued to participate in the Semi-pro League in subsequent seasons.

Udon Banjan United achieved its first major success in the 2025 Thailand Semi-pro League. Competing in the Northeastern region, the club won all 11 matches, scoring 37 goals and conceding only 3, finishing with a perfect 33 points. By clinching the regional championship, Udon Banjan United earned promotion to the 2025–26 Thai League 3, marking the club's entry into professional football for the first time.

== Stadium and locations ==
Coordinates	Location	Stadium	Year
17°26′55″N 102°54′59″E	Mueang, Udon Thani	Udon Thani SAT Stadium	2022–2025
17°24′20″N 102°46′09″E	Mueang, Udon Thani	Main Stadium of Thailand National Sports University, Udon Thani Campus	2025 – present

== Season by season record ==
Season	League									FA Cup	League Cup	T3 Cup	Top goalscorer	
Season	Division	P	W	D	L	F	A	Pts	Pos	FA Cup	League Cup	T3 Cup	Name	Goals
2022	TA Northeast	3	2	1	0	10	2	7	1st	Opted out	Ineligible	Ineligible	(Thailand) Pitipong Wongbut, (Thailand) Thanakrit Jampalee	2
2023	TS Northeast	9	2	6	1	9	10	12	5th	Opted out	Ineligible	Ineligible	(Thailand) Phongphat Pholphut	4
2024	TS Northeast	8	4	1	3	10	7	13	4th	Opted out	Ineligible	Ineligible	(Thailand) Pitipong Wongbut	4
2025	TS Northeast	11	11	0	0	37	3	33	1st	Opted out	Ineligible	Ineligible	(Thailand) Panupong Phuakphralap	11
2025–26	T3 Northeast	22	8	5	9	22	31	29	8th	QR	QRP	QF	(Brazil) João Guimarães	8

Champions	Runners-up	Promoted	Relegated

- P = Played
- W = Games won
- D = Games drawn
- L = Games lost
- F = Goals for
- A = Goals against
- Pts = Points
- Pos = Final position
- QR1 = First Qualifying Round
- QR2 = Second Qualifying Round
- R1 = Round 1
- R2 = Round 2
- R3 = Round 3
- R4 = Round 4
- R5 = Round 5
- R6 = Round 6
- QF = Quarter-finals
- SF = Semi-finals
- RU = Runners-up
- W = Winners

== Players ==
=== Current squad ===
As of 1 October 2026

Note: Flags indicate national team as defined under FIFA eligibility rules; some limited exceptions apply. Players may hold more than one non-FIFA nationality.

No.	Pos.	Nation	Player
1	GK	THA	Chayanan Khamphala
4	MF	THA	Phutchapong Namsrithan
5	DF	THA	Athipat Saengprakai
6	DF	THA	Naruebet Udsa
7	MF	THA	Lursan Thiamrat
9	FW	CMR	Cedrick Platini Kaham
10	FW	NGR	Aliu Micheal Abdul
11	MF	THA	Wansakda Kaoboon
14	MF	THA	Nuttawut Khamrin
16	DF	THA	Akapob Kunnork
17	DF	THA	Worawat Busadee
18	FW	THA	Chotiphat Sicumsaeng
19	GK	THA	Ratthaphum Singboonmee
20	DF	THA	Wongsakorn Seesawai
21	DF	THA	Prayad Pholput

No.	Pos.	Nation	Player
22	MF	THA	Satayu Raksrithong
23	DF	THA	Pongsatorn Sakkhwa
26	MF	THA	Sukakree Inngam
35	DF	THA	Thanathip Paengwong
39	GK	THA	Nopparat Seenareang
44	MF	THA	Sudthirak Chuisiri
71	DF	THA	Athatcha Rahongthong
74	MF	THA	Sompong Saisoda
80	MF	THA	Pornsawan Somsanit
88	DF	THA	Adisak Harntes
90	FW	THA	Natdanai Chudtale
92	MF	THA	Nakharin Pholrach
93	FW	BRA	Felipe Micael
95	FW	THA	Kamonchai Somsuk
99	DF	THA	Sittipat Kreearee
