= Thai League (disambiguation) =

Thai Leagues may refer to:

- Thai League 1
- Thai League 2
- Thai League 3
- Thailand Semi-Pro League
- Thailand Amateur League
- Thai League 4 (defunct)
