= Chiangrai TSC F.C. =

Chiangrai TSC เชียงราย ทีเอสซี
- Full name: Chiangrai TSC Football Club
- Nicknames: Golden Shield Youths (วัยรุ่นโล่ทอง)
- Founded: 2023; 3 years ago
- Ground: Chiang Rai Provincial Stadium; Chiang Rai, Thailand
- Capacity: 5,000
- Coordinates: 19°54′48″N 99°51′21″E
- Owner(s): Chiang Rai TSC Football Club Co., Ltd.
- Chairman: Sangthai Laorungrot
- Head coach: Kolawat Patchararuaychai
- League: Thai League 3
- 2025–26: Thai League 3, 8th of 12 in the Northern region
- Website: Facebook

Chiangrai TSC Football Club (Thai: สโมสรฟุตบอล เชียงราย ทีเอสซี) is a Thai professional football club based in Chiang Rai, Thailand. The club currently competes in the Thai League 3 Northern region, the third tier of the Thai football league system. Founded in 2023, the club is under the management of Thawee SC Wittaya School, a private educational institution in Chiang Rai.

== History ==
Chiangrai TSC Football Club was established in 2023 by the administrators of Thawee SC Wittaya School, a private educational institution in Chiang Rai Province. The club was formed to participate in the 2023 Thailand Semi-pro League, competing in the Northern region, which serves as the fourth tier of the Thai football league system. In their debut season, the team struggled to make a significant impact and did not achieve promotion.

Chiangrai TSC continued to compete in the Thailand Semi-pro League for the following seasons, gradually developing its squad and management structure. In the 2025 Thailand Semi-pro League, the club earned promotion to Thai League 3. The promotion was granted through an additional allocation, aimed at increasing the number of clubs in the Northern region from eleven in the 2024–25 season to twelve in the 2025–26 season. Following their promotion, Chiangrai TSC strengthened their squad by signing two experienced players, Adisak Duangsri and Saran Sridet, both of whom are well-known figures in Thai football.

== Stadium and locations ==
Coordinates	Location	Stadium	Year
19°59′26″N 99°51′00″E	Mueang, Chiang Rai	Stadium of Chiang Rai Rajabhat University	2023
19°54′48″N 99°51′21″E	Mueang, Chiang Rai	Chiang Rai Provincial Stadium	2024 – present

== Season by season record ==
Season	League									FA Cup	League Cup	T3 Cup	Top goalscorer	
Season	Division	P	W	D	L	F	A	Pts	Pos	FA Cup	League Cup	T3 Cup	Name	Goals
2023	TS North	8	1	2	5	9	28	5	4th	Opted out	Ineligible	Ineligible	(Thailand) Teeratada Takham	3
2024	TS North	6	4	1	1	10	4	13	2nd	Opted out	Ineligible	Ineligible	(Thailand) Nawawit Sriwichai	5
2025	TS North	7	4	2	1	17	6	14	2nd	Opted out	Ineligible	Ineligible	(Thailand) Aphithep Thaensopa	3
2025–26	T3 North	22	7	6	9	29	31	27	8th	Opted out	Opted out	Opted out	(Thailand) Tanawit Kamjoi	14

Champions	Runners-up	Promoted	Relegated

- P = Played
- W = Games won
- D = Games drawn
- L = Games lost
- F = Goals for
- A = Goals against
- Pts = Points
- Pos = Final position
- QR1 = First Qualifying Round
- QR2 = Second Qualifying Round
- R1 = Round 1
- R2 = Round 2
- R3 = Round 3
- R4 = Round 4
- R5 = Round 5
- R6 = Round 6
- QF = Quarter-finals
- SF = Semi-finals
- RU = Runners-up
- W = Winners

== Players ==
=== Current squad ===
As of 1 October 2026

Note: Flags indicate national team as defined under FIFA eligibility rules; some limited exceptions apply. Players may hold more than one non-FIFA nationality.

No.	Pos.	Nation	Player
1	GK	THA	Natthawut Paengkrathok
3	DF	THA	Sitthichok Chaiarram
5	DF	THA	Thanadol Dumponngam
6	MF	THA	Techaton Seehawong
7	MF	THA	Phuwit Thaseela
8	MF	THA	Wuthiphan Phanthalee
9	FW	THA	Chatchai Narkwijit
10	FW	THA	Panachai Chaiwut
17	MF	THA	Arucha Phodong
18	GK	THA	Adisak Doungsri
20	GK	THA	Kuntaphat Prommueng
21	MF	THA	Siriyut Manorat
22	MF	THA	Pattharapon Chottiwaronkon
24	MF	THA	Pattarapol Insaart
25	GK	THA	Panuphong Phiwkham

No.	Pos.	Nation	Player
27	MF	THA	Samattawee Wuttinuch
28	MF	THA	Chayapol Sutanadilok
30	MF	THA	Kritsanapong Supanyo
32	MF	THA	Paratthakorn Khampeera
33	FW	THA	Saran Sridet
34	MF	THA	Siwakorn Chimpong
38	MF	THA	Sujinda Singharach (captain)
41	DF	THA	Thanawat Loedchai
45	DF	THA	Thanaphum Chaengbut
47	MF	THA	Phanitchaphon Wutthinut
55	FW	THA	Pakorn Pinsuwan
66	MF	THA	Chakklit Chittarungrot
67	MF	THA	Jirapat Kurasa
89	FW	THA	Aphiphlu Tuidong
99	FW	THA	Tanawit Kamjoi
