= João Guimarães =

Brazilian footballer (born 1998)

Personal information
- Full name: João Victor Guimarães Ribeiro e Silva
- Date of birth: 28 January 1998 (age 28)
- Place of birth: São José dos Campos, Brazil
- Height: 1.76 m (5 ft 9 in)
- Position: Attacking midfielder

Team information
- Current team: Udon Banjan United
- Number: 10

Youth career
- Água Santa

Senior career*
Years	Team	Apps	(Gls)
2016	XV de Piracicaba		
2017−2020	Água Santa		
2020	Humenné		
2021	Merelinense		
2021–2022	Carina Gubin	20	(1)
2022−2023	Snina		(10)
2023−2024	Dukla Banská Bystrica	14	(0)
2023–2024	→ Dolný Kubín (loan)	6	(2)
2024–2025	Khon Kaen	0	(0)
2025–	Udon Banjan United	0	(0)
- * Club domestic league appearances and goals as of 18 May 2024

João Victor Guimarães Ribeiro e Silva (born 28 January 1998), known as João Guimarães is a Brazilian professional footballer who plays for Thai club Udon Banjan United as an attacking midfielder.

== Club career ==
=== Dukla Banská Bystrica ===
João Guimarães made his professional Niké Liga debut for MFK Dukla Banská Bystrica against Slovan Bratislava on 5 August 2023, in an away fixture at Tehelné pole.
