= Sirisak Fufung =

Thai footballer (born 1990)

Personal information
- Full name: Sirisak Fufung
- Date of birth: 18 August 1990 (age 36)
- Place of birth: Rayong, Thailand
- Position: Left winger

Team information
- Current team: Phichit United
- Number: 78

Senior career*
Years	Team	Apps	(Gls)
2014	Marines Eureka		
2015–2021	Rayong	40	(8)
2021	Trat	3	(0)
2022	Nakhon Pathom United	9	(1)
2022	Pluakdaeng United	9	(2)
2023	Asawin Kohkwang United	11	(3)
2023	Bankhai United	8	(3)
2026–	Phichit United	1	(0)
- * Club domestic league appearances and goals as of 22 March 2026

Sirisak Fufung (Thai: ศิริศักดิ์ ฟูฟุ้ง; born August 18, 1990) is a Thai professional footballer who plays as a left winger for Thai League 3 club Phichit United.
