= Adisak Duangsri =

Thai footballer (born 1985)

Personal information
- Full name: Adisak Duangsri
- Date of birth: 18 May 1985 (age 41)
- Place of birth: Ubon Ratchathani, Thailand
- Height: 1.80 m (5 ft 11 in)
- Position: Goalkeeper

Team information
- Current team: Chiangrai TSC
- Number: 18

Senior career*
Years	Team	Apps	(Gls)
2009	TOT	21	(0)
2010	TTM Phichit	19	(0)
2011	Bangkok United	3	(0)
2012	BBCU	12	(0)
2012	PTT Rayong	10	(0)
2013–2014	Phuket	29	(0)
2015	Port	3	(0)
2015	TOT	10	(0)
2016	Ubon UMT United	16	(0)
2017	Songkhla United	17	(0)
2018–2019	Phuket City	14	(1)
2019–2024	Lamphun Warrior	30	(2)
2015–	Chiangrai TSC	12	(0)
Total		196	(3)
- * Club domestic league appearances and goals as of 22 March 2026

Adisak Duangsri (Thai: อดิศักดิ์ ดวงศรี, born 18 May 1985), simply known as Ting (Thai: ติ่ง), is a Thai retired professional footballer who plays as a goalkeeper.

Adisak was also known for his ability as a free kick specialist.

== Honour ==
Lamphun Warriors

- Thai League 2 (1): 2021–22
- Thai League 3 (1): 2020–21
