= Boubacar Koné =

Ivoirien footballer

Aboubacar Sidiki Koné
Personal information
- Full name: Aboubacar Sidiki Koné
- Date of birth: 3 May 1992 (age 34)
- Place of birth: Abidjan, Ivory Coast
- Height: 1.82 m (6 ft 0 in)
- Position: Midfielder

Team information
- Current team: Phichit United
- Number: 21

Youth career
- 2006-09: Académie Renaissance Aimso

Senior career*
Years	Team	Apps	(Gls)
2011	Association Sportive Settat	14	(4)
2012–2013	Krung Thonburi	36	(8)
2014	Customs United	17	(3)
2015	Rajpracha	34	(6)
2016–2020	Kasetsart	142	(12)
2020–2021	MOF Customs United	31	(2)
2021	Chainat United	10	(1)
2021–2022	Saraburi United	15	(2)
2022–2023	MH Nakhon Si City	27	(0)
2023	Customs United	16	(0)
2024–2025	Angthong	18	(1)
2026–	Phichit United	11	(2)
- * Club domestic league appearances and goals as of 30 March 2026

Aboubacar Sidiki Koné (born 3 May 1992) is an Ivorian professional footballer who plays as a midfielder for Phichit United in Thai League 3.

== Club career ==
Koné played for AS Bamako, before signed 2006 to Al-Merrikh SC. He played one and a half-year in Sudan for Al-Merrikh and moved than to MAS Fes. Koné played four years in Morocco, before left the club in January 2011 to join Algerian side JS Kabylie. In summer 2012 returned to Mali and signed with Djoliba AC.

== International career ==
Koné was part of the Mali U-20 team who finish third in group stage of 2003 FIFA World Youth Championship, and was part of the Malian 2004 Olympic football team, who exited in the quarter-finals, finishing top of group A, but losing to Italy in the next round.

Koné was selected for the 2008 Africa Cup of Nations. He made his debut with the senior side in a 2006 FIFA World Cup qualifying match against Liberia on 5 June 2005.

== Honours ==
MH Nakhon Si City

- Thai League 3: 2022–23
