= Felipe Micael =

Brazilian footballer (born 2001)

Personal information
- Full name: Felipe Micael Tenorio Menezes
- Date of birth: 3 July 2001 (age 25)
- Place of birth: Catanduva, Brazil
- Height: 1.78 m (5 ft 10 in)
- Position: Forward

Team information
- Current team: Udon Banjan United
- Number: 93

Youth career
- –2020: Mirassol

Senior career*
Years	Team	Apps	(Gls)
2019–2020	Mirassol	4	(0)
2020–2021	Beerschot	0	(0)
2021	→ Al-Hilal United (loan)	0	(0)
2021–2023	Ceará	0	(0)
2022	→ FC Cascavel (loan)	3	(0)
2023–2024	Athletic	2	(0)
2024	Chiangmai	9	(6)
2024	Muang Trang United	0	(0)
2025	Yala		
2025–	Udon Banjan United		
- * Club domestic league appearances and goals as of 12 December 2025

Felipe Micael Tenorio Menezes (born 3 July 2001) is a Brazilian footballer who plays as a forward for Thai League 3 Southern region football club Udon Banjan United.

== Career statistics ==
=== Club ===
As of 22 September 2020.

Club	Season	League			State league		Cup		Other		Total	
Club	Season	Division	Apps	Goals	Apps	Goals	Apps	Goals	Apps	Goals	Apps	Goals
Mirassol	2019	–			0	0	0	0	4 (Note: Appearances in the Copa Paulista)	0	4	0
Mirassol	2020	Série D	0	0	0	0	0	0	0	0	0	0
Mirassol	Total		0	0	0	0	0	0	4	0	4	0
Beerschot	2020–21	Jupiler Pro League	0	0	–		0	0	0	0	0	0
Career total			0	0	0	0	0	0	4	0	4	0
