= Phichit United F.C. =

Phichit United พิจิตร ยูไนเต็ด
- Full name: Phichit United Football Club
- Nicknames: The Merciless Crocodile (ไอ้เข้อำมหิต)
- Founded: 2021; 5 years ago
- Ground: Phichit Stadium; Phichit, Thailand
- Capacity: 15,000
- Coordinates: 16°26′35″N 100°19′26″E
- Owner(s): Phichit United 2021 Co., Ltd.
- Chairman: Surachit Chanprom
- Head coach: Vimon Juncum
- League: Thai League 3
- 2025–26: Thai League 3, 3rd of 12 in the Northern region
- Website: Facebook

Phichit United Football Club (Thai สโมสรฟุตบอล พิจิตร ยูไนเต็ด) is a Thai professional football club based in Phichit. It was established in 2021. The club competes in Thai League 3, the third tier of Thai football league system.

== History ==
Phichit United Football Club was established in 2021. The club initially registered to participate in the 2021 Thailand Amateur League (Northern region). Unfortunately, the tournament was cancelled due to the COVID-19 outbreak in Thailand, which prevented the club from making its competitive debut that year. In 2022, the club made a fresh attempt to compete in the Thailand Amateur League and performed well, finishing fourth in the Northern region. This result demonstrated the club's potential and laid a solid foundation for future progress.

In 2023, Phichit United took a significant step forward by joining the newly formed Thailand Semi-pro League. They had successfully met the club licensing criteria required for entry, and the club impressed in their debut season at this level by finishing as runners-up in the Northern region. This was a notable achievement that highlighted their growing competitiveness. The club continued to build on that momentum in 2024, competing again in the Thailand Semi-pro League. This time, they secured a respectable third-place finish in the region, further solidifying their reputation as a consistent contender.

In 2025, Phichit United reached a historic milestone by winning the Northern region title in the Thailand Semi-pro League. This achievement earned them promotion to Thai League 3 for the first time in the club's history, marking a remarkable rise from amateur football to the professional ranks. That season also featured key player signings that attracted widespread attention. The club brought former Thai national team winger Sarawut Masuk, adding valuable experience and skill to the squad. Additionally, they gave a second chance to Itsaret Noijaiboon, a player who had been involved in a controversial incident where he elbowed an opposing player, causing a facial fracture and requiring 24 stitches. After that incident in March 2022, Bangkok F.C. immediately terminated his contract, and the Football Association of Thailand imposed a three-year ban from all domestic competitions. With the ban now expired, Phichit United offered him an opportunity to revive his career and contribute to the club's success. That same year, the club also secured a sponsorship deal with Akara Resources Public Company Limited, a prominent gold mining company based in Phichit province. This partnership provided essential financial support and strengthened the club's connection with the local community, paving the way for even greater achievements in the future.

== Stadium and locations ==
Coordinates	Location	Stadium	Year
16°26′35″N 100°19′26″E	Mueang, Phichit	Phichit Stadium	2022 – present

== Season by season record ==
Season	League									FA Cup	League Cup	T3 Cup	Top goalscorer	
Season	Division	P	W	D	L	F	A	Pts	Pos	FA Cup	League Cup	T3 Cup	Name	Goals
2022	TA North	5	3	2	0	12	4	11	4th	QR	Ineligible	Ineligible	(Thailand) Ekkapoom Potharungroj	5
2023	TA North	8	5	2	1	25	10	17	2nd	Opted out	Ineligible	Ineligible	(Thailand) Naruephat Noisomwong	7
2024	TS North	6	3	1	2	10	3	10	3rd	Opted out	Ineligible	Ineligible	(Thailand) Pittaya Loed-in	2
2025	TS North	7	5	2	0	18	4	17	1st	Opted out	Ineligible	Ineligible	(Thailand) Ranyapakorn Konsanthia	4
2025–26	T3 North	22	9	7	6	39	29	34	3rd	R2	QR2	LP	(Nigeria) Michael Arinze Anunobi	12

Champions	Runners-up	Promoted	Relegated

- P = Played
- W = Games won
- D = Games drawn
- L = Games lost
- F = Goals for
- A = Goals against
- Pts = Points
- Pos = Final position
- QR1 = First Qualifying Round
- QR2 = Second Qualifying Round
- R1 = Round 1
- R2 = Round 2
- R3 = Round 3
- R4 = Round 4
- R5 = Round 5
- R6 = Round 6
- QF = Quarter-finals
- SF = Semi-finals
- RU = Runners-up
- W = Winners

== Players ==
=== Current squad ===
As of 1 October 2026

Note: Flags indicate national team as defined under FIFA eligibility rules; some limited exceptions apply. Players may hold more than one non-FIFA nationality.

No.	Pos.	Nation	Player
1	GK	THA	Withun Thomyim
2	FW	THA	Ranyapakorn Konsanthia
3	DF	THA	Suphasan Ruangsupanimit
4	MF	THA	Nuttapol Srisamutr
5	DF	THA	Satja Sangsuwan (vice-captain)
6	MF	THA	Apiwat Dangpuk
7	MF	THA	Arthit Sunthornpit
8	FW	THA	Ekkapoom Potharungroj
9	FW	THA	Panuwit Sriwichai
10	FW	NGR	Michael Arinze Anunobi
12	DF	THA	Thanakorn Kaewduangdee
13	MF	JPN	Ryo Tomigahara
14	FW	THA	Sarawut Masuk
15	DF	THA	Patiwat Tinamat
16	DF	THA	Jirayut Chaophonkrang

No.	Pos.	Nation	Player
17	MF	THA	Amnart Rakprasert
18	DF	THA	Panudech Suabpeng
19	FW	THA	Kreeta Nantakit
21	MF	CIV	Boubacar Koné
23	FW	THA	Bunchoo Saekum
25	GK	THA	Atthapon Rutham
29	FW	THA	Khajonsak Choojit
35	MF	THA	Woranat Thongkruea
40	DF	THA	Wirat Nakpan
56	FW	THA	Naraphat Ngodngam
69	FW	THA	Pakpum Boonpa
77	MF	THA	Wacharachai Phothibal
80	MF	THA	Sitthiphong Sonchan
88	GK	THA	Wanchai Suwanin
98	DF	THA	Parinya Khattiya
99	FW	THA	Abdulkordiri Hamid
