= Michel (footballer, born 1997) =

Brazilian footballer

Personal information
- Full name: Michel Barbosa de Lima
- Date of birth: 12 May 1997 (age 29)
- Place of birth: Rio de Janeiro, Brazil
- Height: 1.87 m (6 ft 2 in)
- Position: Forward

Team information
- Current team: PT Prachuap
- Number: 20

Youth career
- –2011: Fluminense
- 2012–2015: Flamengo
- 2016: Criciúma

Senior career*
Years	Team	Apps	(Gls)
2017	Rio São Paulo		
2018	Bangu	0	(0)
2019–2020	Boavista-RJ	14	(2)
2020–2024	Oliveirense	88	(18)
2021–2022	→ Académica (loan)	7	(0)
2023	→ Sport Recife (loan)	7	(1)
2024	Yokohama	2	(0)
2025–	PT Prachuap	0	(0)
- * Club domestic league appearances and goals as of 13 July 2025

Michel Barbosa de Lima (born 12 May 1997), commonly known as Michel, is a Brazilian professional footballer who plays as a forward for Thai League 1 club PT Prachuap.

== Career statistics ==
=== Club ===
As of 14 March 2021.

Appearances and goals by club, season and competition
Club	Season	League			State league		Cup		Other		Total	
Club	Season	Division	Apps	Goals	Apps	Goals	Apps	Goals	Apps	Goals	Apps	Goals
Bangu	2018	–			0	0	0	0	1 (Note: Appearance(s) in Copa Rio)	0	1	0
Boavista-RJ	2019	Série D	9	1	1 (Note: Appearance(s) in Campeonato Carioca)	0	0	0	6	3	16	4
Boavista-RJ	2020	–			13	3	1	0	0	0	14	3
Boavista-RJ	Total		9	1	14	3	1	0	6	3	30	7
Oliveirense	2020–21	Liga Portugal 2	20	1	–		2	0	0	0	22	1
Career total			9	0	5	1	0	0	0	0	14	1
