= SAT Stadium Udon Thani =

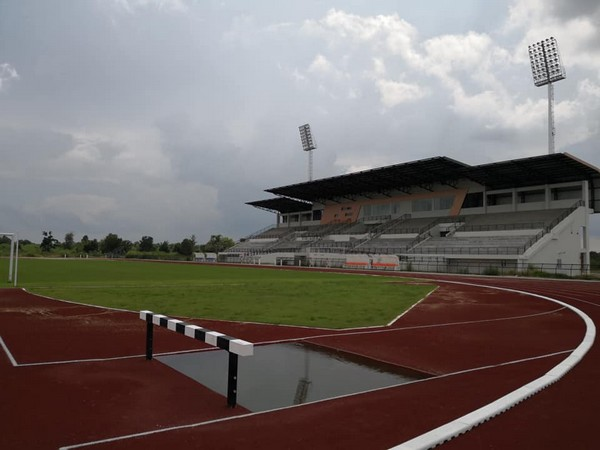
- Interactive map of SAT Stadium Udon Thani
- Location: Sam Phrao, Mueang Udon Thani, Udon Thani, Thailand
- Coordinates: 17°26′55″N 102°54′59″E
- Owner: Sports Authority of Thailand (SAT)
- Operator: Udon Thani Provincial Administration Organisation
- Capacity: 10,000
- Surface: Grass

Construction
- Opened: 2018

Tenant
- Udon Thani F.C. (from 2019)

SAT Stadium Udon Thani (Thai: สนามกีฬากลางจังหวัดอุดรธานี) is a multi-purpose stadium in Mueang Udon Thani, Udon Thani, Thailand. It was completed in 2018 and from 2019 it will be the home stadium of Udon Thani F.C., competing in the Thai League 2. The stadium holds a capacity of 10,000 spectators.
