= Thailand Semi-pro League =

- Organising body: Thai League Co., Ltd.
- Founded: 2023; 3 years ago
- Country: Thailand
- Confederation: AFC
- Number of clubs: 40
- Level on pyramid: 4
- Promotion to: Thai League 3
- Domestic cup: Thai FA Cup
- Current champions: MNK (1st title) (2026)
- Website: www.thaileague.co.th/ta
- Current: 2027 Thailand Semi-pro League

Thailand Semi-pro League (Thai: ไทยแลนด์ เซมิโปรลีก), commonly known as the TS, is the fourth tier of the Thai football league system, organized by the Football Association of Thailand (FA Thailand) and managed by Thai League Co., Ltd. The league was established in 2023 as a pathway for amateur clubs seeking promotion to Thai League 3.

Clubs participating in the competition are admitted through an annual application process. As a result, the number of participating clubs varies from season to season, depending on the number of applicants meeting the Semi-pro Club Licensing requirements set by the Football Association of Thailand.

The competition operates without relegation, with regional champions earning promotion to Thai League 3.

== Season records ==
In the inaugural 2023 season, the competition was divided into five regional zones: Northern, Northeastern, Eastern, Western, and Bangkok Metropolitan. The Southern region was not contested due to a lack of club applications. As a result, the Southern promotion berth was allocated to the champions of the 2023 Thailand Amateur League Southern region.

In 2024, the competition expanded to include all six regional zones: Northern, Northeastern, Eastern, Western, Southern, and Bangkok Metropolitan, reflecting increased nationwide participation.

From the 2025 season onward, the league continued to operate with six regional zones. However, the Bangkok Metropolitan region was dissolved and replaced by the newly established Central region in accordance with the regional restructuring introduced in the 2024–25 Thai League 3.

In 2026, the competition format was further revised with the introduction of a league-phase scheduling system in the Regional Stage. Under this format, clubs no longer played a traditional round-robin schedule within their regions. Instead, fixture pairings were predetermined through a computerized draw system, with each club playing six matches consisting of three home matches and three away matches, regardless of the number of participating clubs in each region.

The qualification format for the national championship was also changed. Unlike previous seasons, which featured a National Championship Stage contested by all six regional champions, the 2026 season used a ranking system based on Regional Stage records to determine the finalists. The two highest-ranked regional champions advanced directly to the Finals, which were contested over two legs on a home-and-away basis.

No.	Seasons	Number of clubs	National Championship		Promoted clubs		
No.	Seasons	Number of clubs	Champions	Runners-up	Region	Winners	Special promoted club(s)
1	2023	34	Satun	Khelang United	Northern	Khelang United	
1	2023	34	Satun	Khelang United	Northeastern	Suranaree Army 2	
1	2023	34	Satun	Khelang United	Eastern	Prachinburi City	Banfootball Pattaya (Note: Due to the promotion of Chanthaburi and Pattaya Dolphins United in the 2022–23 Thai League 3 Eastern region, there must be 2 teams in the 2023 Thailand Semi-pro League Eastern region promoted to replace them.)
1	2023	34	Satun	Khelang United	Western	Thap Luang United	
1	2023	34	Satun	Khelang United	Southern		Satun (Note: Because there is no competition in the Southern region of the 2023 Thailand Semi-pro League, the right to promotion and qualification goes to the winner of the 2023 Thailand Amateur League Southern region.)
1	2023	34	Satun	Khelang United	Bangkok Metropolitan	The iCON RSU	
2	2024	38	Roi Et PB United	Dome	Northern	Chattrakan City	
2	2024	38	Roi Et PB United	Dome	Northeastern	Roi Et PB United	
2	2024	38	Roi Et PB United	Dome	Eastern	Padriew City	
2	2024	38	Roi Et PB United	Dome	Western	Samut Songkhram City	
2	2024	38	Roi Et PB United	Dome	Southern	Yala City	
2	2024	38	Roi Et PB United	Dome	Bangkok Metropolitan	Dome	
3	2025	40	Banbueng City	Samui United	Northern	Phichit United	Chiangrai TSC (Note: Chiangrai TSC was promoted to Thai League 3 through an additional allocation, to increase the number of clubs in the Northern region from 11 in the 2024–25 season to 12 in the 2025–26 season.)
3	2025	40	Banbueng City	Samui United	Northeastern	Udon Banjan United	EUMT (Note: Due to the promotion of Rasisalai United in the 2024–25 Thai League 3 Northeastern region, there must be one additional team in the 2025 Thailand Semi-pro League Northeastern region promoted to replace them.)
3	2025	40	Banbueng City	Samui United	Eastern	Banbueng City	
3	2025	40	Banbueng City	Samui United	Central	Singburi Warriors	Futera United (Note: Futera United were promoted to the Thai League 3 Central region for the 2025–26 season following the relegation of AUU Inter Bangkok and Dome, who failed to meet club licensing requirements. The promotion right was initially allocated to Ayutthaya PK, runners-up of the 2024–25 Thailand Semi-pro League Central region, but the club also failed to pass licensing. Consequently, the place was awarded to Futera United, who had finished third in that competition.)
3	2025	40	Banbueng City	Samui United	Western (Note: Although The Wall, winners of the Thailand Semi-pro League Western region, were eligible for promotion to Thai League 3, the club failed to meet the required club licensing standards. As a result, no club from the Western region was promoted.)		
3	2025	40	Banbueng City	Samui United	Southern	Samui United	Chumphon United (Note: Due to the promotion of Songkhla and Pattani in the 2024–25 Thai League 3 Southern region, there must be 2 teams in the 2025 Thailand Semi-pro League Southern region promoted to replace them.)
4	2026	53	MNK	Ayutthaya PK	Northern	TNSU Lampang	Paknampho
4	2026	53	MNK	Ayutthaya PK	Northeastern	Esan Fighter	Pitchaya Bundit College
4	2026	53	MNK	Ayutthaya PK	Eastern	MNK	Banbueng
4	2026	53	MNK	Ayutthaya PK	Central	Ayutthaya PK	Bangkapi
4	2026	53	MNK	Ayutthaya PK	Western	Phetchaburi	
4	2026	53	MNK	Ayutthaya PK	Southern	Nara	Yala City
