= Phichit Stadium =

Stadium in Thailand

Phichit Provincial Stadium
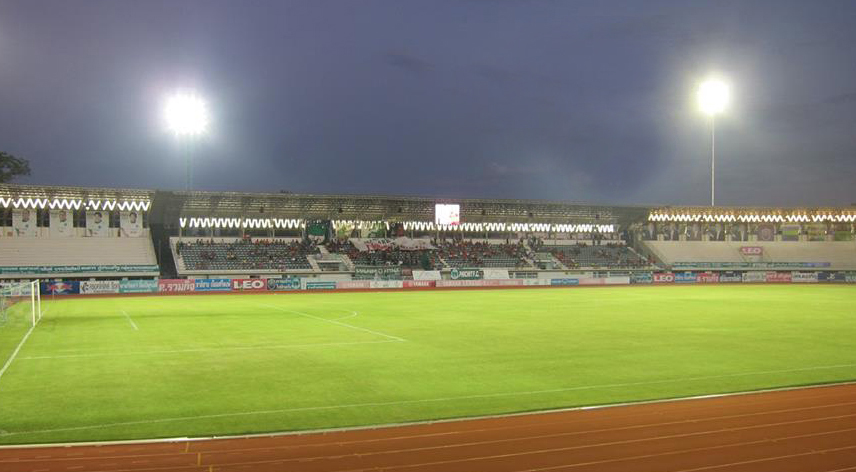
- Interactive map of Phichit Provincial Stadium
- Location: Phichit, Thailand
- Coordinates: 16°26′35″N 100°19′26″E
- Owner: Phichit Municipality
- Operator: Phichit Municipality
- Capacity: 15,000
- Surface: Grass

Construction
- Opened: N/A

Phichit Provincial Stadium (Thai: สนามกีฬากลางจังหวัดพิจิตร หรือ สนาม อบจ.พิจิตร), is a stadium located in Phichit, Thailand. It is currently used for football matches. The stadium holds 15,000 spectators.

It is the home stadium of Phichit FC.
