= 2024–25 Thai League Cup =

Hilux Revo Cup

Tournament details
- Country: Thailand
- Dates: 31 August 2024 – 31 May 2025
- Teams: 79

Final positions
- Champions: Buriram United (8th title)
- Runners-up: Lamphun Warriors

Tournament statistics
- Matches played: 78
- Goals scored: 228 (2.92 per match)
- Top goal scorer(s): Jardel (5 goals)

Awards
- Best player: Guilherme Bissoli

The 2024–25 Thai League Cup marks the 15th season of Thailand's knockout football competition in its second era. This edition of the League Cup signals the tournament's return to Thai football after a 10-year hiatus. Sponsored by Toyota Motor Thailand, it is officially known as the Hilux Revo Cup (Thai: ไฮลักซ์ รีโว่ คัพ), named after Toyota's truck model. 79 clubs have been accepted into the competition, which commenced with the first qualification round on 31 August 2024 and will conclude with the final on 31 May 2025. Notably, the tournament is open exclusively to clubs from Thai League 1, Thai League 2, and Thai League 3.

The competition structure is as follows: Clubs from Thai League 3 begin their journey in the qualifying rounds, which are organized regionally. As the tournament progresses, clubs from Thai League 2 enter during the play-off round. The first round then sees the entry of clubs from Thai League 1, who await the winners of the previous rounds.

The competition awards 5 million baht to the champions and 1 million baht to the runners-up. The League Cup’s reintroduction drew notable interest within Thai football. In addition to domestic silverware, the winner of the final earned qualification for the ASEAN Club Championship, adding regional relevance to the match. With both teams representing different regions and supported by large fan bases, the final highlighted the current profile of Thai football in Southeast Asia.

== Calendar ==
Round	Date	Matches	Clubs	New entries this round
First qualification round	31 August 2024 and 1 September 2024	13	26 → 13	26 2024–25 Thai League 3
Second qualification round	6–8 September 2024	18	13 + 23 → 18	23 2024–25 Thai League 3
Qualification play-off round	2 October 2024	16	18 + 14 → 16	14 2024–25 Thai League 2
First round	30 October 2024 and 5 February 2025	16	16 + 16 → 16	16 2024–25 Thai League 1
Second round	26 February 2025	8	16 → 8	
Quarter-finals	15–16 April 2025	4	8 → 4	
Semi-finals	17–18 May 2025	2	4 → 2	
Final	31 May 2025	1	2 → Champions	
Total				79 clubs

== Results ==
Note: T1: Clubs from Thai League 1; T2: Clubs from Thai League 2; T3: Clubs from Thai League 3.

=== First qualification round ===
26 clubs from the 2024–25 Thai League 3 participated in the first qualification round of the 2024–25 Thai League Cup. The draw for this round took place on 20 August 2024. 37 goals were scored in this round.

Northern region
The first qualification round of the 2024–25 Thai League Cup in the Northern Region featured 4 clubs from the 2024–25 Thai League 3 Northern Region.

31 August 2024	Nakhon Sawan See Khwae City (T3)	2–2 (a.e.t.) (2–4 p)	Phitsanulok (T3)	Mueang, Nakhon Sawan
15:00 (UTC+7)	Narong Jansawek 45'; Debiro Dzarma Bata 120'	Report	Chawanthananchai Sirichoo 30'; Anuluk Yeunhan 101'	Stadium: Nakhon Sawan Provincial Stadium; Attendance: – Referee: Prasert Arjpukdee; Assistant referees: Vithit Wilasphaingoen, Kosit Laochaem; Fourth official: Apipong Saehoe
	Penalties
	Narong Jansawek (penalty scored); Sunchai Singsom (penalty missed); Pornchai Daengjaroen (penalty scored); Park Jun-do (penalty missed)		(penalty scored) Narasak Phophung; (penalty scored) Thawatchai Auppanan; (penalty scored) Chompoo Sangpo; (penalty scored) Jeerachai Ladadok

31 August 2024	Khelang United (T3)	2–0	Chattrakan City (T3)	Mueang, Lampang
15:00 (UTC+7)	Mathas Kajaree 26' (pen.); Veerapat Mekhumrai 47'	Report		Stadium: Stadium of Lampang Rajabhat University; Attendance: 92; Referee: Suphanat Yainta; Assistant referees: Teeradet Bongkotnimitchai, Weera Banlengchai; Fourth official: Chirawat Chomphoosee

Central region
The first qualification round of the 2024–25 Thai League Cup in the Central Region featured 2 clubs from the 2024–25 Thai League 3 Central Region.

31 August 2024	Prime Bangkok (T3)	3–0	Saraburi United (T3)	Lak Si, Bangkok
15:00 (UTC+7)	Chawanwit Saelao 32', 78'; Aekkaphong Phimankasemsri 49'	Report		Stadium: Boonyachinda Stadium; Attendance: 256; Referee: Direk Kaort; Assistant referees: Nattapong Wadweangcom, Waranon Soonsuwan; Fourth official: Anon Borisut

Northeastern region
The first qualification round of the 2024–25 Thai League Cup in the Northeastern Region featured 2 clubs from the 2024–25 Thai League 3 Northeastern Region.

31 August 2024	Ubon Kruanapat (T3)	2–2 (a.e.t.) (4–3 p)	Khon Kaen Mordindang (T3)	Mueang, Ubon Ratchathani
17:00 (UTC+7)	Jibril Antala Abubakar 21'; Kabangu Nathan 37'	Report	Tanapol Srithong 14'; Pakawat Wongsrikaew 47'	Stadium: Stadium of Ubon Ratchathani Rajabhat University; Attendance: 580; Referee: Chairat Phooalai; Assistant referees: Rutratchapoom Moolpong, Yodsakorn Pakdeesuwan; Fourth official: Damrong Wangraha
	Penalties
	Oscar Plape (penalty scored); Terdsak Samat (penalty scored); Phitakpong Chaiyapho (penalty missed); Kabangu Nathan (penalty scored); Wanchaiya Charoenloi (penalty scored)		(penalty scored) Natthaphon Phinitluek; (penalty scored) Kittin Lorjanad; (penalty missed) Tanapol Srithong; (penalty scored) Thanarat Suphanklang; (penalty missed) Nuttawut Nartthaisong

Eastern region
The first qualification round of the 2024–25 Thai League Cup in the Eastern Region featured 6 clubs from the 2024–25 Thai League 3 Eastern Region.

31 August 2024	Toko Customs United (T3)	4–1	BFB Pattaya City (T3)	Bang Phli, Samut Prakan
16:30 (UTC+7)	Ronnachai Rangsiyo 21', 45'; Apiwit Samurmuen 43' (pen.); Peeranat Jantawong 88'	Report	Nontawat Udomsukyawon 24' (pen.)	Stadium: Lad Krabang 54 Stadium; Attendance: 490; Referee: Samrit Ritkaew; Assistant referees: Phongsiri Chusi, Phitsanu Chusi; Fourth official: Nasri Tamat

31 August 2024	Bankhai United (T3)	1–1 (a.e.t.) (4–2 p)	Fleet (T3)	Ban Khai, Rayong
18:00 (UTC+7)	Anucha Pantong 15'	Report	Narutchai Nimboon 56'	Stadium: Wai Krong Stadium; Attendance: 227; Referee: Ekkachai Phetcham; Assistant referees: Narinsak Thongkham, Pakorn Srichumsin; Fourth official: Anucha Pinamon
	Penalties
	Tawan Huntumlay (penalty scored); Supakorn Kladkleed (penalty scored); Anucha Pantong (penalty missed); Saharat Rattanawijit (penalty scored); John Owoeri (penalty scored)		(penalty scored) Osvaldo Nascimento dos Santos Neto; (penalty missed) Tanakrit Kaukeaw; (penalty scored) Nitikorn Pengsawat; (penalty missed) Anuson Thaloengram

31 August 2024	Navy (T3)	4–3 (a.e.t.)	Saimit Kabin United (T3)	Sattahip, Chonburi
18:00 (UTC+7)	Pongpan Parapan 4'; Luan Santos 35'; Thanathorn Chanphet 111'; Arthit Bua-ngam 120+1'	Report	Yod Chantawong 50'; Luan Borges Machado Martins 86'; Ademola Sodiq Adeyemi 94'	Stadium: Sattahip Navy Stadium; Attendance: 198; Referee: Somkhid Sarapim; Assistant referees: Sahatnet Deemongkol, Kittinan Sotorphrphakorn; Fourth official: Pongthep Raipimai

Western region
The first qualification round of the 2024–25 Thai League Cup in the Western Region featured 6 clubs from the 2024–25 Thai League 3 Western Region.

1 September 2024	Thonburi United (T3)	1–0	Samut Songkhram City (T3)	Nong Khaem, Bangkok
15:00 (UTC+7)	Chatturong Longsriphum 90+2'	Report		Stadium: Thonburi Stadium; Attendance: 275; Referee: Krisda Luangyos; Assistant referees: Kittinan Sotorphrphakorn, Narinsak Thongkham; Fourth official: Chaikrit Inboonsong

1 September 2024	Samut Sakhon City (T3)	2–1	Nonthaburi United (T3)	Mueang, Samut Sakhon
17:00 (UTC+7)	Ratchapol Nawanno 56'; Supakorn Nutvijit 82' (o.g.)	Report	Kiangsak Taobutr 90+4'	Stadium: Stadium of Thailand National Sports University, Samut Sakhon Campus; Attendance: 320; Referee: Sila Jinnigorn; Assistant referees: Khomchalach Lekhawijit, Authen Dansalao; Fourth official: Boonsong Prachumrak

1 September 2024	Thap Luang United (T3)	0–1	Rajpracha (T3)	Kamphaeng Saen, Nakhon Pathom
18:00 (UTC+7)		Report	Marko Milenkovic 57'	Stadium: Stadium of Kasetsart University, Kamphaeng Saen Campus; Attendance: 540; Referee: Anucha Pinamon; Assistant referees: Kiadtisak Janmol, Thitibodi Rumnet; Fourth official: Kriangkrai Thiphanunjarukorn

Southern region
The first qualification round of the 2024–25 Thai League Cup in the Southern Region featured 6 clubs from the 2024–25 Thai League 3 Southern Region.

1 September 2024	Satun (T3)	1–1 (a.e.t.) (3–4 p)	Muang Trang United (T3)	Mueang, Satun
16:00 (UTC+7)	Porncha Rodnakkaret 41'	Report	Somprat Reuengnun 90'	Stadium: Satun PAO. Stadium; Attendance: 1,895; Referee: Anas Poheng; Assistant referees: Parinya Patkong, Worawut Siraya; Fourth official: Atsanai Phetchuy
	Penalties
	Victor Clemente de Oliveira Capinan (penalty scored); Wellerson da Silva Machado Guimarães (penalty missed); Chamsuddeen Sohteng (penalty missed); Chaiya Nakkaree (penalty scored); Natthaphon Hehna (penalty scored); Adisak Ganu (penalty missed)		(penalty scored) Diogo Pereira; (penalty scored) Aittipol Panadee; (penalty scored) Phuchakhen Chandaeng; (penalty missed) Somprat Reuengnun; (penalty missed) Kridsada Limseeput; (penalty scored) Akarat Punkaew

1 September 2024	Pattani (T3)	2–1	Yala City (T3)	Mueang, Pattani
16:45 (UTC+7)	Pithak Abulraman 17'; Rushdan Katemmadee 40'	Report	Muhammadsalfadee Jehteh 45+1'	Stadium: Pattani PAO. Stadium; Attendance: 3,000; Referee: Wichai Pannil; Assistant referees: Sarayut Phaewsaart, Satira Yunyongkait; Fourth official: Pornpipat Chaisawat

1 September 2024	Songkhla (T3)	0–0 (a.e.t.) (3–5 p)	Phuket Andaman (T3)	Mueang, Songkhla
17:30 (UTC+7)		Report		Stadium: Tinsulanon Stadium; Attendance: 450; Referee: Matoha Sayo; Assistant referees: Preecha Lanui, Sakda Madmanang; Fourth official: Manop Lempan
	Penalties
	Abdulhafis Nibu (penalty missed); Emerson Felipe Alves Peixoto de Almeida (penalty scored); Apdussalam Saman (penalty scored); Anwa A-leemama (penalty scored)		(penalty scored) Rungsak Kodcharak; (penalty scored) Coulibaly Chomana; (penalty scored) Abdelrahman Osama Mohamed Abdelmoneim Mohamed Saleh; (penalty scored) Akkharadech Singtotong; (penalty scored) Satawat Sakprom

=== Second qualification round ===
The second qualification round consists of 13 clubs from 2024–25 Thai League 3, winners of the first qualification round, alongside 23 new clubs from the same league. 38 goals were scored in this round.

Northern region
The second qualification round of the 2024–25 Thai League Cup in the Northern Region featured 6 clubs from the 2024–25 Thai League 3 Northern Region.

7 September 2024	Northern Nakhon Mae Sot United (T3)	1–0	TPF Uttaradit (T3)	Mae Sot, Tak
15:00 (UTC+7)	Hazem Mohamed Mahmoud Mohamed 57'	Report		Stadium: Five Border Districts Stadium; Attendance: 280; Referee: Sirikron Lorboon; Assistant referees: Ronachai Raepang, Thanaporn Ouicharoen; Fourth official: Ekkachai Juywong

7 September 2024	Phitsanulok (T3)	0–1	Khelang United (T3)	Mueang, Phitsanulok
18:00 (UTC+7)		Report	Arnon Thongpanya 86'	Stadium: Phitsanulok PAO. Stadium; Attendance: 800; Referee: Tanavit Prompet; Assistant referees: Thirawat Saekue, Suthipong Ontuwong; Fourth official: Audom Jadsarikit

8 September 2024	Phitsanulok Unity (T3)	1–0	Kamphaengphet (T3)	Mueang, Phitsanulok
18:00 (UTC+7)	Kunburus Sounses 82'	Report		Stadium: Phitsanulok PAO. Stadium; Attendance: 167; Referee: Nattawut Pornchaiwirun; Assistant referees: Pramote Boon-in, Vithit Wilasphaingoen; Fourth official: Apisak Chaingaokongkha

Central region
The second qualification round of the 2024–25 Thai League Cup in the Central Region featured 4 clubs from the 2024–25 Thai League 3 Central Region.

7 September 2024	Kasem Bundit University (T3)	1–0	PTU Pathum Thani (T3)	Min Buri, Bangkok
15:00 (UTC+7)	Ozobialu Chinedu Kennedy 90+2'	Report		Stadium: Stadium of Kasem Bundit University; Attendance: 253; Referee: Danai Yommool; Assistant referees: Nanthawat Chobsuan, Watchara Wongkhan; Fourth official: Sopon Boonlest

7 September 2024	Prime Bangkok (T3)	3–0	Lopburi City (T3)	Lak Si, Bangkok
15:00 (UTC+7)	Alexandar Mutic 20', 90+1'; Chawanwit Saelao 77'	Report		Stadium: Boonyachinda Stadium; Attendance: 220; Referee: Nattaphak Sawasdee; Assistant referees: Theerapon Nonthakhamjan, Tibeth Longtree; Fourth official: Dassakhon Hokla

Northeastern region
The second qualification round of the 2024–25 Thai League Cup in the Northeastern Region featured 6 clubs from the 2024–25 Thai League 3 Northeastern Region.

6 September 2024	Ubon Kruanapat (T3)	0–2	Udon United (T3)	Mueang, Ubon Ratchathani
17:00 (UTC+7)		Report	Thawatchai Aocharod 65'; Chatri Rattanawong 82'	Stadium: Stadium of Ubon Ratchathani Rajabhat University; Attendance: 300; Referee: Kulthawat Sisanong; Assistant referees: Suriyawong Ramsri, Suksan Thongkoed; Fourth official: Anantip Phopan

7 September 2024	Roi Et PB United (T3)	1–0	Muang Loei United (T3)	Mueang, Maha Sarakham
18:00 (UTC+7)	Sakda Manchat 15'	Report		Stadium: Mahasarakham Provincial Stadium; Attendance: 1,352; Referee: Kittiwat Kittpaksakun; Assistant referees: Kittichot Worasan, Teerapak Saibun; Fourth official: Natthakan Thongchok

7 September 2024	Khon Kaen (T3)	0–1	Surin Khong Chee Mool (T3)	Mueang, Khon Kaen
18:00 (UTC+7)		Report	Praphas Rattanadee 89'	Stadium: Khon Kaen PAO. Stadium; Attendance: 128; Referee: Anan Keawmuangkhun; Assistant referees: Jakkrit Pratum, Suriyakamon Keawpooban; Fourth official: Yodtawee Ridsri

Eastern region
The second qualification round of the 2024–25 Thai League Cup in the Eastern Region featured 8 clubs from the 2024–25 Thai League 3 Eastern Region.

8 September 2024	Pluakdaeng United (T3)	1–2	Marines (T3)	Pluak Daeng, Rayong
15:00 (UTC+7)	Muhamadasman Satoh 6'	Report	Noppadon Nobphasai 3', 35'	Stadium: CK Stadium; Attendance: 120; Referee: Palathip Homwarn; Assistant referees: Adisai Pongnairat, Niruch Panjontuk; Fourth official: Chaiwat Rupsa-at

8 September 2024	Toko Customs United (T3)	1–1 (a.e.t.) (4–5 p)	Padriew City (T3)	Bang Phli, Samut Prakan
16:30 (UTC+7)	Siwakorn Tawasiko 90'	Report	Atip Wattana 13'	Stadium: Stadium of Customs Department, Lad Krabang 54; Attendance: 173; Referee: Nararit Srivorakul; Assistant referees: Wararit Suwanjira, Kanathip Waithaisong; Fourth official: Pornthep Promsopa
	Penalties
	Takuto Hirao (penalty scored); Taiga Matsunaga (penalty missed); Siwakorn Tawasiko (penalty scored); Phurewat Aunthong (penalty scored); Kueanun Junumpai (penalty scored)		(penalty scored) Kongpon Ployprapai; (penalty scored) Jeera Laohachinda; (penalty scored) Phanupong Aemphiphat; (penalty scored) Eakachi Saengprasert; (penalty scored) Patiroop Sunjonlord

8 September 2024	Bankhai United (T3)	2–2 (a.e.t.) (3–4 p)	ACDC (T3)	Ban Khai, Rayong
18:00 (UTC+7)	Natthikorn Yaprom 61'; Sattra Ratlongmueang 72'	Report	Jakkapan Chanakarn 9'; Thanawin Chanaupatham 26'	Stadium: Wai Krong Stadium; Attendance: 257; Referee: Chayapol Laosuphan; Assistant referees: Apidet Rawangton, Narit Mungtoemklang; Fourth official: Panya Nawasimainam
	Penalties
	Saharat Rattanawijit (penalty scored); Jakkapong Pholjuang (penalty scored); Punnapob Namanu (penalty missed); Lucas Massaro García Gama (penalty scored); Lucas Daubermann (penalty missed)		(penalty scored) Natchapol Jitkasem; (penalty scored) Ken Hagihara; (penalty missed) Aitsara Suktaeng; (penalty scored) Ratthathammanun Deeying; (penalty scored) Songsang Moungyon

8 September 2024	Navy (T3)	0–3 (awd.)	Chachoengsao Hi-Tek (T3)	Sattahip, Chonburi
18:00 (UTC+7)				Stadium: Sattahip Navy Stadium; Referee: Watcharasak Intharak; Assistant referees: Puttipong Saensarn, Kodcharat Rattanachot; Fourth official: Theerapon Nakthong

Western region
The second qualification round of the 2024–25 Thai League Cup in the Western Region featured 6 clubs from the 2024–25 Thai League 3 Western Region.

8 September 2024	Maraleina (T3)	1–0	Hua Hin City (T3)	Hua Hin, Prachuap Khiri Khan
15:00 (UTC+7)	Fallou Sarr 28'	Report		Stadium: Hua Hin Town Municipality Stadium; Attendance: 100; Referee: Worapon Sanjan; Assistant referees: Nutsin Boonrod, Sarawut Nenrod; Fourth official: Jirayu Jonganuruk

8 September 2024	Rajpracha (T3)	2–2 (a.e.t.) (3–5 p)	Thonburi United (T3)	Bang Yai, Nonthaburi
15:00 (UTC+7)	Kunanon Paothong 33' (o.g.); Marko Milenkovic 39'	Report	Bouda Henry Ismael 16'; Opeyemi Korede Ajayi 51'	Stadium: Nonthaburi Stadium; Attendance: 160; Referee: Rangsan Kangchainguan; Assistant referees: Pongsakorn Choosri, Thanaphon Chaowanon; Fourth official: Chayanan Tuto
	Penalties
	Marko Milenkovic (penalty scored); Nattapol Hothong (penalty scored); Nattachai Srisuwan (penalty missed); Mongkol Tossakrai (penalty scored)		(penalty scored) Natthawut Puangdao; (penalty scored) Kittipong Seanphong; (penalty scored) Tanasrap Srikotapach; (penalty scored) Bouda Henry Ismael; (penalty scored) Suradech Klankham

8 September 2024	Samut Sakhon City (T3)	2–0	VRN Muangnont (T3)	Mueang, Samut Sakhon
17:00 (UTC+7)	Ratchapol Nawanno 15'; Abdul Karim Ayeh 37'	Report		Stadium: Stadium of Thailand National Sports University, Samut Sakhon Campus; Attendance: 355; Referee: Wutthinan Jampawai; Assistant referees: Kittichok Huthip, Den Bunyakittakun; Fourth official: Arun Budtasee

Southern region
The second qualification round of the 2024–25 Thai League Cup in the Southern Region featured 6 clubs from the 2024–25 Thai League 3 Southern Region.

8 September 2024	Pattani (T3)	0–3	Nara United (T3)	Mueang, Pattani
16:45 (UTC+7)		Report	Caio da Conceição Silva 23', 44'; Somnuek Kaewarporn 51'	Stadium: Pattani PAO. Stadium; Attendance: 7,500; Referee: Mayara Day; Assistant referees: Chawalit Chaikaew, Yuaidee Cheming; Fourth official: Iffan Phanwang

8 September 2024	Muang Trang United (T3)	2–1 (a.e.t.)	Phuket Andaman (T3)	Huai Yot, Trang
18:00 (UTC+7)	Aorachun Changmoung 3'; Sattaporn Suso 119'	Report	Muhammad Limapichatsakul 48'	Stadium: Muang Trang Stadium; Attendance: 1,670; Referee: Nirut Suetrong; Assistant referees: Mayunai Kueteh, Sakri Mahama; Fourth official: Yod Damhai

8 September 2024	Phatthalung (T3)	1–1 (a.e.t.) (4–5 p)	PSU Surat Thani City (T3)	Mueang, Phatthalung
18:00 (UTC+7)	Erivelto 120'	Report	Natthawut Aiamchan 111'	Stadium: Phatthalung PAO. Stadium; Attendance: 800; Referee: Anwa Hayiyusoh; Assistant referees: Abdulrohim Sitiloh, Saifulloh Saka; Fourth official: Wisarut Damthaklong
	Penalties
	Erivelto (penalty scored); Aitipol Kaewkeaw (penalty scored); Teerawat Durnee (penalty missed); Caio Silva Sena dos Santos (penalty scored); Wichitchai Chauyseenual (penalty scored)		(penalty scored) Toloba Aremu Kassim Mouyidine; (penalty scored) Pakawat Taengoakson; (penalty scored) Amnuai Nueaoon; (penalty scored) Aphiwat Sukwinai; (penalty scored) Chonnasit Hemmaraj

=== Qualification play-off round ===
The qualification play-off round consists of 18 clubs from 2024–25 Thai League 3, winners of the second qualification round, alongside 14 new clubs from 2024–25 Thai League 2. The draw for this round took place on 12 September 2024. 52 goals were scored in this round.

2 October 2024	Prime Bangkok (T3)	1–2	Samut Prakan City (T2)	Lak Si, Bangkok
15:00 (UTC+7)	Lars William Kvist 49'	Report	Panudech Maiwong 15'; Phitchanon Chanluang 32'	Stadium: Boonyachinda Stadium; Attendance: 269; Referee: Chaikrit Inboonsong; Assistant referees: Khomchalach Lekhawijit, Kriangsak Pimsanit; Fourth official: Theerapon Nonthakhamjan

2 October 2024	Khelang United (T3)	0–2	Chanthaburi (T2)	Mueang, Lampang
15:00 (UTC+7)		Report	Nattawut Dantrawen 9'; Nattapon Junlanan 87' (o.g.)	Stadium: Stadium of Lampang Rajabhat University; Attendance: 211; Referee: Peerasan Krataithong; Assistant referees: Songrit Trakulchai, Nonthanan Khanthawong; Fourth official: Wathanyu Morin

2 October 2024	PSU Surat Thani City (T3)	1–2	Lampang (T2)	Mueang, Surat Thani
15:00 (UTC+7)	Rattasart Makasoot 48'	Report	Caio Rodrigues da Cruz 5'; Judivan 63'	Stadium: Stadium of Prince of Songkla University, Surat Thani Campus; Attendance: 540; Referee: Phairot Bunkamnoed; Assistant referees: Yossapon Tongprom, Permsak Saisuwan; Fourth official: Matoha Sayo

2 October 2024	Northern Nakhon Mae Sot United (T3)	1–0	Kanchanaburi Power (T2)	Mae Sot, Tak
15:00 (UTC+7)	Pitsanu Ngamsanguan 26'	Report		Stadium: Five Border Districts Stadium; Attendance: 123; Referee: Direk Kaort; Assistant referees: Suwit Kongtongnok, Jonrak Sangcharern; Fourth official: Wirot Oupachit

2 October 2024	Nara United (T3)	4–2	Mahasarakham SBT (T2)	Mueang, Narathiwat
15:00 (UTC+7)	Phuket Fueangkhon 12', 35'; Somnuek Kaewarporn 88'; Sittipong Buasong 90+5'	Report	Kittipong Wongma 4'; Nattapon Thaptanon 52'	Stadium: Narathiwat PAO. Stadium; Attendance: 2,000; Referee: Paisan Bendem-alee; Assistant referees: Jareon Nunboon, Pornchai Kongdamni; Fourth official: Wichai Pannil

2 October 2024	Kasem Bundit University (T3)	0–3	Chonburi (T2)	Min Buri, Bangkok
15:00 (UTC+7)		Report	Suksan Bunta 25'; Amadou Ouattara 71'; Yotsakorn Burapha 82'	Stadium: Stadium of Kasem Bundit University; Attendance: 500; Referee: Wichate Tainthong; Assistant referees: Authen Dansalao, Kittinan Sotorphrphakorn; Fourth official: Kristin Saisombat

2 October 2024	ACDC (T3)	1–1 (a.e.t.) (4–2 p)	Pattaya United (T2)	Sattahip, Chonburi
15:00 (UTC+7)	Natchapol Jitkasem 45'	Report	Patthadon Tiangwong 11'	Stadium: Battleship Stadium; Attendance: 195; Referee: Putthipong Issising; Assistant referees: Kantrakorn Ngaosri, Padsakorn Jaihom; Fourth official: Phadoongkiat Piangdee
	Penalties
	Arthit Sangkla (penalty scored); Aitsara Suktaeng (penalty scored); Phasit Panmoon (penalty scored); Worachet Bumphenkiattikul (penalty scored)		(penalty scored) Phufah Chuenkomrak; (penalty scored) Thaned Benyapad; (penalty missed) Kongphop Luadsong; (penalty missed) Waleed Adel Mohamed Mohamed Moubarak

2 October 2024	Marines (T3)	1–2	Chainat Hornbill (T2)	Sattahip, Chonburi
15:00 (UTC+7)	Chonlapat Singruang 63'	Report	Cholnatee Senson 24'; Sattrawut Auppachai 57'	Stadium: Sattahip Navy Stadium; Attendance: 125; Referee: Atiwat Seelalo; Assistant referees: Nissan Janthep, Sarayut Sriampri; Fourth official: Pongthep Raipimai

2 October 2024	Maraleina (T3)	2–2 (a.e.t.) (5–3 p)	Thonburi United (T3)	Mueang, Phetchaburi
17:00 (UTC+7)	Pitchayut Chaiyosaeng 43'; Kittisak Pongsanin 48'	Report	Opeyemi Korede Ajayi 83'; Tanasrap Srikotapach 90'	Stadium: Stadium of Phetchaburi Rajabhat University; Attendance: – Referee: Saravut Suksalee; Assistant referees: Ronnarong Kiratijumraen, Nutsin Boonrod; Fourth official: Tawan Suriyawong
	Penalties
	Isaac Honore Aime Mbengan (penalty scored); Akarat Thoburee (penalty scored); Kanok Sangkasopha (penalty scored); Thanathorn Pholpimai (penalty scored); Jirapat Klimkaew (penalty scored)		(penalty scored) Natthawut Puangdao; (penalty scored) Kittipong Seanphong; (penalty scored) Sirakorn Pimbaotham; (penalty missed) Supakrit Piromnark

2 October 2024	Udon United (T3)	0–1 (a.e.t.)	Kasetsart (T2)	Mueang, Udon Thani
17:00 (UTC+7)		Report	Jakkapan Pornsai 120' (pen.)	Stadium: Stadium of Thailand National Sports University, Udon Thani Campus; Attendance: 445; Referee: Somkhid Sarapim; Assistant referees: Nattapong Wadweangcom, Maitree Nuengkhammee; Fourth official: Kanoksak Khiaodaeng

2 October 2024	Samut Sakhon City (T3)	4–1	Nakhon Si United (T2)	Mueang, Samut Sakhon
17:00 (UTC+7)	Weerasak Gayasit 43'; Patiphan Pinsermsootsri 62'; Filipe Vasconcelos Paim 83', 90+3'	Report	Nutthapong Chuekamut 82'	Stadium: Stadium of Thailand National Sports University, Samut Sakhon Campus; Attendance: 270; Referee: Thapakorn Thongkon; Assistant referees: Phitsanu Chusi, Phongsiri Chusi; Fourth official: Nasri Tamat

2 October 2024	Muang Trang United (T3)	2–1	Suphanburi (T2)	Huai Yot, Trang
18:00 (UTC+7)	Diogo Pereira 55', 86'	Report	Babatunde Olamide Onifade 82'	Stadium: Muang Trang Stadium; Attendance: 1,400; Referee: Sapuding Kalong; Assistant referees: Hanyot Buangrab, Mongkhon Kaisin; Fourth official: Yod Damhai

2 October 2024	Chachoengsao Hi-Tek (T3)	0–1	Sisaket United (T2)	Mueang, Chachoengsao
18:00 (UTC+7)		Report	Caíque Freitas Ribeiro 74'	Stadium: Chachoengsao Town Municipality Stadium; Attendance: 663; Referee: Kriangkrai Thiphanunjarukorn; Assistant referees: Pathompong Anunluksanakul, Kiadtisak Janmol; Fourth official: Danai Yommool

2 October 2024	Roi Et PB United (T3)	7–0	Surin Khong Chee Mool (T3)	Mueang, Roi Et
18:00 (UTC+7)	Sakda Manchat 27'; Thammawat Yenram 43'; Thongchai Ratchai 45+1'; Santirad Weing-in 62', 65'; Sudhkat Phomduang 83' (pen.); Aphisit Thaewkrathok 88' (pen.)	Report		Stadium: Roi Et Provincial Stadium; Attendance: 262; Referee: Kittichot Worasan; Assistant referees: Natthapol Sewakawihalee, Natthakan Thongchok; Fourth official: Kittiwat Kittpaksakun

2 October 2024	Phitsanulok Unity (T3)	0–3	Police Tero (T2)	Mueang, Phitsanulok
18:00 (UTC+7)		Report	Fernando Viana 82', 90+5'; Adolph Kodzo Koudakpo 90+6'	Stadium: Phitsanulok PAO. Stadium; Attendance: 302; Referee: Samrit Ritkaew; Assistant referees: Apichat Prasasak, Phichayut Noitathong; Fourth official: Piyapong Thongkhain

2 October 2024	Padriew City (T3)	1–4	Bangkok (T2)	Mueang, Chachoengsao
18:30 (UTC+7)	Sarayut Pongphaew 21'	Report	Simon Dia 39'; Siwa Phommas 47'; Amornthep Maundee 74'; Wichaya Pornprasart 82'	Stadium: Chachoengsao Provincial Stadium; Attendance: 567; Referee: U-sen Yala; Assistant referees: Siwat Chaithong, Waranon Soonsuwan; Fourth official: Aidsara Gaedthai

=== First round ===
The first round consists of 32 clubs. This includes 16 clubs advancing from the qualification play-off round, with 9 clubs representing the 2024–25 Thai League 2 and 7 clubs from the 2024–25 Thai League 3. Additionally, 16 top-tier clubs from the 2024–25 Thai League 1 joined the competition at this stage. The draw for this round took place on 4 October 2024. 63 goals were scored in this round.

30 October 2024	Roi Et PB United (T3)	1–0	Sukhothai (T1)	Mueang, Roi Et
15:00 (UTC+7)	Suphakrit Dongchan 25'	Report; Highlight		Stadium: Roi Et Provincial Stadium; Attendance: 1,450; Referee: Sahapop Sriboonlue; Assistant referees: Tanate Chuchuen, Kasama Loyma; Fourth official: Jirawit Phonkaew

30 October 2024	Nara United (T3)	2–2 (a.e.t.) (3–5 p)	Khon Kaen United (T1)	Mueang, Narathiwat
15:00 (UTC+7)	Manso Ausman 78'; Anon San-Mhard 92'	Report; Highlight	Sampan Kesi 20'; Ryu Seung-woo 109'	Stadium: Narathiwat PAO. Stadium; Attendance: 2,000; Referee: Sapuding Kalong; Assistant referees: Chaowalit Poonprasit, Sarayut Sriampri; Fourth official: Anwa Hayiyusoh
	Penalties
	Caio da Conceição Silva (penalty scored); Phuket Fueangkhon (penalty scored); Salman Waesuemae (penalty scored); Juan Francisco Odorisio (penalty missed)		(penalty scored) Phalakon Woklang; (penalty scored) Ryu Seung-woo; (penalty scored) Saksit Jitvijan; (penalty scored) Jiradet Taichankong; (penalty scored) Adisak Sosungnoen

30 October 2024	ACDC (T3)	1–9	Nongbua Pitchaya (T1)	Sattahip, Chonburi
15:00 (UTC+7)	Krisnatee Kaewrakmuk 70'	Report; Highlight	Jardel 21', 36', 53', 66', 90+1'; Chawin Srichan 50' (pen.); Chaiyapruek Chirachin 51'; Jakkrawut Songma 65'; Marcus Haber 79'	Stadium: Battleship Stadium; Attendance: 168; Referee: Satchukorn Saenchu; Assistant referees: Watthana Chonchanakul, Srisuwan Boonnum; Fourth official: Kristin Saisombat

30 October 2024	Northern Nakhon Mae Sot United (T3)	1–1 (a.e.t.) (3–5 p)	Rayong (T1)	Mae Sot, Tak
15:00 (UTC+7)	Chatchai Narkwijit 82'	Report; Highlight	Lwin Moe Aung 22'	Stadium: Five Border Districts Stadium; Attendance: 277; Referee: Chaireag Ngam-som; Assistant referees: Worapong Prasartsri, Apichat Prasasak; Fourth official: Peerasan Krataithong
	Penalties
	Thanat Tangnontanakorn (penalty scored); Apisit Bunsrikul (penalty scored); Chatchai Narkwijit (penalty missed); Hazem Mohamed Mahmoud Mohamed (penalty scored)		(penalty scored) Peerapat Kaminthong; (penalty scored) Kanokpon Puspakom; (penalty scored) Yashir Islame; (penalty scored) Suwat Junboonpha; (penalty scored) Aphiwat Hanchai

30 October 2024	Maraleina (T3)	1–3	Lamphun Warriors (T1)	Mueang, Phetchaburi
16:30 (UTC+7)	Kritsanai Panesana 71'	Report; Highlight	Patcharapol Intanee 10'; Tawan Khotrsupho 52'; Jefferson Assis 77'	Stadium: Stadium of Phetchaburi Rajabhat University; Attendance: 120; Referee: Paisan Bendem-alee; Assistant referees: Yossapon Tongprom, Teerapon Sunyapluem; Fourth official: Alongkorn Khonwai

30 October 2024	Samut Sakhon City (T3)	2–4	Uthai Thani (T1)	Mueang, Samut Sakhon
17:00 (UTC+7)	Arnon Prasongporn 46'; Jonas Josaran Schwabe 90+4' (o.g.)	Report; Highlight	Ricardo Santos 27', 71'; Chakkit Laptrakul 49'; William Weidersjö 59'	Stadium: Stadium of Thailand National Sports University, Samut Sakhon Campus; Attendance: 420; Referee: Thapakorn Thongkon; Assistant referees: Phubes Lekpha, Songrit Trakulchai; Fourth official: Pawara Seejen

30 October 2024	Kasetsart (T2)	1–3	Bangkok United (T1)	Chatuchak, Bangkok
17:00 (UTC+7)	Brinner 43'	Report; Highlight	Anon Amornlerdsak 45'; Thossawat Limwannasathian 58'; Chukid Wanpraphao 74'	Stadium: Insee Chantarasatit Stadium; Attendance: 1,714; Referee: Kotchapoom Meesridaecha; Assistant referees: Rawut Nakarit, Vichet Getkaew; Fourth official: Kriangkrai Thiphanunjarukorn

30 October 2024	Muang Trang United (T3)	1–0	Muangthong United (T1)	Huai Yot, Trang
18:00 (UTC+7)	Muhammad-erawan Duereh 75'	Report; Highlight		Stadium: Muang Trang Stadium; Attendance: 2,111; Referee: Natee Choosuwan; Assistant referees: Tanin Reunjit, Tuwae-yusoh Kuji; Fourth official: Phairot Bunkamnoed

30 October 2024	Chainat Hornbill (T2)	3–1	Nakhon Ratchasima Mazda (T1)	Mueang, Chainat
18:00 (UTC+7)	Songkran Kareesor 4'; Thitiwat Phranmaen 80'; Thanayut Jittabud 86'	Report; Highlight	Somkaet Kunmee 90+3'	Stadium: Khao Plong Stadium; Attendance: 829; Referee: Panumas Phansamo; Assistant referees: Sumate Peasiri, Wirot Lokham; Fourth official: Woottipong Ketkam

30 October 2024	Samut Prakan City (T2)	1–2	Nakhon Pathom United (T1)	Bang Phli, Samut Prakan
18:30 (UTC+7)	Narongrit Kamnet 38'	Report; Highlight	Tatchanon Nakarawong 18'; Sunchai Chaolaokhwan 61'	Stadium: Stadium of Customs Department, Lad Krabang 54; Attendance: 175; Referee: Niwat Insa-ard; Assistant referees: Chotrawee Tongduang, Banpot Khunhong; Fourth official: Chaikrit Inboonsong

30 October 2024	Lampang (T2)	1–2	Buriram United (T1)	Mueang, Lampang
18:30 (UTC+7)	Mehti Sarakham 37'	Report; Highlight	Dion Cools 45+3'; Supachai Chaided 78'	Stadium: Lampang Provincial Stadium; Attendance: 3,589; Referee: Noppadet Mangngam; Assistant referees: Apichit Nophuan, Rachan Dawangpa; Fourth official: Wathanyu Morin

30 October 2024	Sisaket United (T2)	1–3	Chiangrai United (T1)	Mueang, Sisaket
19:00 (UTC+7)	Thaweekun Thong-on 17'	Report; Highlight	Chitchanok Xaysensourinthone 13'; Banphakit Phrmanee 25'; Carlos Iury Bezerra da Silva 81'	Stadium: Sri Nakhon Lamduan Stadium; Attendance: 1,522; Referee: Sivakorn Pu-udom; Assistant referees: Suriya Lee-intr, Chaiya Sripak; Fourth official: U-sen Yala

30 October 2024	Chanthaburi (T2)	2–3	Ratchaburi (T1)	Mueang, Chanthaburi
19:30 (UTC+7)	Tiago Chulapa 56'; Marut Budrak 90+3'	Report; Highlight	Siwakorn Jakkuprasat 36'; Mohamed Mara 45+1' (pen.); Tana 75'	Stadium: Chanthaburi PAO. Stadium; Attendance: 636; Referee: Sarayut Jakngoen; Assistant referees: Natthaphon Mala, Waranyoo Chomgoson; Fourth official: Phadoongkiat Piangdee

30 October 2024	Bangkok (T2)	0–5	BG Pathum United (T1)	Thung Khru, Bangkok
20:00 (UTC+7)		Report; Highlight	Chananan Pombuppha 17'; Chanathip Songkrasin 21'; Christian Gomis 34'; Nattawut Suksum 88'; Warinthon Jamnongwat 90+1'	Stadium: 72nd Anniversary Stadium, Bang Mot; Attendance: 1,237; Referee: Wiwat Jumpaoon; Assistant referees: Rachain Srichai, Narin Wongprapipak; Fourth official: Komgrit Ponpasit

30 October 2024	Police Tero (T2)	1–2	PT Prachuap (T1)	Lak Si, Bangkok
20:00 (UTC+7)	Fernando Viana 75'	Report; Highlight	Barros Tardeli 46', 69' (pen.)	Stadium: Boonyachinda Stadium; Attendance: 521; Referee: Winat Phophat; Assistant referees: Komsan Kampan, Binla Preeda; Fourth official: Kitisak Pikunngoen

5 February 2025	Chonburi (T2)	0–4	Port (T1)	Mueang, Chonburi
18:00 (UTC+7)		Report; Highlight	Peniel Mlapa 32' (pen.); Felipe Amorim 39', 68'; Anon Amornlerdsak 47'	Stadium: Chonburi Daikin Stadium; Attendance: 3,542; Referee: Winat Phophat; Assistant referees: Rawut Nakarit, Tanate Chuchuen; Fourth official: Satchukorn Saenchu

=== Second round ===
The second round consists of 16 clubs, all securing victories in the first round. This stage features 13 clubs from the T1, 1 club from the T2, and 2 clubs from the T3. The draw for this round took place on 28 January 2025. 19 goals were scored in this round.

26 February 2025	Roi Et PB United (T3)	0–3	Uthai Thani (T1)	Mueang, Roi Et
15:00 (UTC+7)		Report; Highlight	Charalampos Charalampous 51'; Tiago Alves 76', 90+2'	Stadium: Roi Et Provincial Stadium; Attendance: 1,140; Referee: Noppadet Mangngam; Assistant referees: Chaowalit Poonprasit, Kasama Loyma; Fourth official: Vitsavet Sangnakorn

26 February 2025	Muang Trang United (T3)	1–3 (a.e.t.)	Lamphun Warriors (T1)	Huai Yot, Trang
17:30 (UTC+7)	Felipe Micael 36'	Report; Highlight	Witthaya Moonwong 40'; Fabio Teixeira da Silva 111'; Anan Yodsangwal 120+2'	Stadium: Muang Trang Stadium; Attendance: 1,341; Referee: Thapakorn Thongkon; Assistant referees: Suriya Lee-intr, Wirot Lokham; Fourth official: Paisan Bendem-alee

26 February 2025	Chainat Hornbill (T2)	0–1	Bangkok United (T1)	Mueang, Chai Nat
18:00 (UTC+7)		Report; Highlight	Manuel Bihr 90+1'	Stadium: Khao Plong Stadium; Attendance: 952; Referee: Woottipong Ketkam; Assistant referees: Rachain Srichai, Phubes Lekpha; Fourth official: Peerasan Krataithong

26 February 2025	Chiangrai United (T1)	1–0	PT Prachuap (T1)	Mueang, Chiang Rai
18:00 (UTC+7)	Harhys Stewart 41'	Report; Highlight		Stadium: Singha Chiangrai Stadium; Attendance: 3,020; Referee: Chaireag Ngam-som; Assistant referees: Worapong Prasartsri, Binla Preeda; Fourth official: Kristin Saisombat

26 February 2025	Nongbua Pitchaya (T1)	0–0 (a.e.t.) (4–2 p)	Nakhon Pathom United (T1)	Mueang, Nong Bua Lamphu
18:30 (UTC+7)		Report; Highlight		Stadium: Pitchaya Stadium; Attendance: 1,006; Referee: Sivakorn Pu-udom; Assistant referees: Chotrawee Tongduang, Yossapon Tongprom; Fourth official: Satchukorn Saenchu
	Penalties
	Conrado (penalty scored); Marcus Haber (penalty scored); Park Jong-woo (penalty scored); Jorge Fellipe (penalty scored)		(penalty scored) Taku Ito; (penalty missed) Auttapon Sangtong; (penalty scored) Sunchai Chaolaokhwan; (penalty missed) Amir Hossein Nemati

26 February 2025	Port (T1)	3–2	Khon Kaen United (T1)	Khlong Toei, Bangkok
19:00 (UTC+7)	Worachit Kanitsribampen 6'; Lonsana Doumbouya 29', 48'	Report; Highlight	Phattharaphon Junsuwan 40', 56'	Stadium: PAT Stadium; Attendance: 2,494; Referee: Wiwat Jumpaoon; Assistant referees: Tanin Reunjit, Narin Wongprapipak; Fourth official: Putthipong Issising

26 February 2025	Buriram United (T1)	3–1	BG Pathum United (T1)	Mueang, Buriram
19:00 (UTC+7)	Martin Boakye 32'; Supachai Chaided 46'; Guilherme Bissoli 84' (pen.)	Report; Highlight	Raniel 75'	Stadium: Chang Arena; Attendance: 16,126; Referee: Sarayut Jakngoen; Assistant referees: Apichit Nophuan, Rachan Dawangpa; Fourth official: Jirawit Phonkaew

26 February 2025	Rayong (T1)	0–1	Ratchaburi (T1)	Mueang, Rayong
19:30 (UTC+7)		Report; Highlight	Clément Depres 41'	Stadium: Rayong Provincial Stadium; Attendance: 954; Referee: Songkran Bunmeekiart; Assistant referees: Tanate Chuchuen, Watthana Chonchanakul; Fourth official: Kotchapoom Meesridaecha

=== Quarter-finals ===
The quarter-finals consist of 8 clubs, all from the T1. These clubs progressed to this stage after winning their respective matches in the second round. The draw for this round took place on 13 March 2025. 9 goals were scored in this round.

15 April 2025	Chiangrai United (T1)	1–2	Ratchaburi (T1)	Mueang, Chiang Rai
18:30 (UTC+7)	Tanasak Srisai 90+4'	Report; Highlight	Njiva Rakotoharimalala 17'; Kim Ji-min 42'	Stadium: Singha Chiangrai Stadium; Attendance: 3,529; Referee: Chaikrit Inboonsong; Assistant referees: Phubes Lekpha, Tanate Chuchuen; Fourth official: Noppadet Mangngam

16 April 2025	Lamphun Warriors (T1)	2–0	Port (T1)	Mueang, Lamphun
17:00 (UTC+7)	Negueba 17'; Júnior Batista 70'	Report; Highlight		Stadium: Mae Guang Stadium; Attendance: 2,675; Referee: Sivakorn Pu-udom; Assistant referees: Sumate Peasiri, Natthaphon Mala; Fourth official: Satchukorn Saenchu

16 April 2025	Nongbua Pitchaya (T1)	1–0	Uthai Thani (T1)	Mueang, Nong Bua Lamphu
18:00 (UTC+7)	Judivan 53' (pen.)	Report; Highlight		Stadium: Pitchaya Stadium; Attendance: 1,035; Referee: Thapakorn Thongkon; Assistant referees: Poonsawat Samransuk, Chaowalit Poonprasit; Fourth official: Putthipong Issising

16 April 2025	Bangkok United (T1)	1–2 (a.e.t.)	Buriram United (T1)	Khlong Luang, Pathum Thani
19:00 (UTC+7)	Thitiphan Puangchan 90+6'	Report; Highlight	Peter Žulj 61'; Guilherme Bissoli 113'	Stadium: Thammasat Stadium; Attendance: 3,834; Referee: Sarayut Jakngoen; Assistant referees: Banpot Khunhong, Tanin Reunjit; Fourth official: Peerasan Krataithong

=== Semi-finals ===
The semi-finals consist of 4 clubs, all from the T1. These clubs progressed to this stage after winning their respective matches in the quarter-finals. The draw for this round took place on 24 April 2025. 8 goals were scored in this round.

17 May 2025	Lamphun Warriors (T1)	1–0 (a.e.t.)	Ratchaburi (T1)	Mueang, Chonburi
19:00 (UTC+7)	Júnior Batista 94'	Report; Highlight		Stadium: Chonburi Daikin Stadium; Attendance: 1,965; Referee: Zhang Lei; Assistant referees: Cao Yi, Ma Ji; Fourth official: Sila Jinnigorn

18 May 2025	Nongbua Pitchaya (T1)	0–7	Buriram United (T1)	Khlong Toei, Bangkok
19:00 (UTC+7)		Report; Highlight	Ratthanakorn Maikami 5'; Nathakorn Rattanasuwan 11', 13'; Martin Boakye 15', 58'; Seksan Ratree 78'; Guilherme Bissoli 89'	Stadium: PAT Stadium; Attendance: 1,944; Referee: Chae Sang-hyeop; Assistant referees: Kwak Seung-soon, Bang Gi-yeol; Fourth official: Kitisak Pikunngoen

=== Final ===
The final consists of 2 clubs, both from the T1. These clubs progressed to this stage after winning their respective matches in the semi-finals. 2 goals were scored in this round.

31 May 2025	Lamphun Warriors (T1)	0–2	Buriram United (T1)	Thanyaburi, Pathum Thani
18:45 (UTC+7)		Report; Highlight	Guilherme Bissoli 90+8' (pen.); Dion Cools 90+14'	Stadium: BG Stadium; Attendance: 10,019; Referee: Kim Woo-sung; Assistant referees: Yoon Jae-yeol, Park Sang-Jun; Fourth official: Wiwat Jumpaoon

== Tournament statistics ==
=== Top goalscorers ===
Rank	Player	Club	Goals
1	(Brazil) Jardel	Nongbua Pitchaya	5
2	(Brazil) Guilherme Bissoli	Buriram United	4
3	(Italy) Martin Boakye	Buriram United	3
3	(Brazil) Fernando Viana	Police Tero	3
3	(Thailand) Chawanwit Saelao	Prime Bangkok	3
6	(Malaysia) Dion Cools	Buriram United	2
6	(Thailand) Nathakorn Rattanasuwan	Buriram United	2
6	(Thailand) Supachai Chaided	Buriram United	2
6	(Thailand) Phattharaphon Junsuwan	Khon Kaen United	2
6	(Brazil) Judivan	Lampang (1), Nongbua Pitchaya (1)	2
6	(Brazil) Júnior Batista	Lamphun Warriors	2
6	(Thailand) Noppadon Nobphasai	Marines	2
6	(Brazil) Diogo Pereira	Muang Trang United	2
6	(Brazil) Caio da Conceição Silva	Nara United	2
6	(Thailand) Phuket Fueangkhon	Nara United	2
6	(Thailand) Somnuek Kaewarporn	Nara United	2
6	(Guinea) Lonsana Doumbouya	Port	2
6	(Brazil) Felipe Amorim	Port	2
6	(Sweden) Alexandar Mutic	Prime Bangkok	2
6	(Brazil) Barros Tardeli	PT Prachuap	2
6	(Serbia) Marko Milenkovic	Rajpracha	2
6	(Thailand) Sakda Manchat	Roi Et PB United	2
6	(Thailand) Santirad Weing-in	Roi Et PB United	2
6	(Brazil) Filipe Vasconcelos Paim	Samut Sakhon City	2
6	(Thailand) Ratchapol Nawanno	Samut Sakhon City	2
6	(Nigeria) Opeyemi Korede Ajayi	Thonburi United	2
6	(Thailand) Ronnachai Rangsiyo	Toko Customs United	2
6	(Brazil) Ricardo Santos	Uthai Thani	2
6	(Brazil) Tiago Alves	Uthai Thani	2

=== Hat-tricks ===
Player	For	Against	Result	Date	Round
(Brazil) Jardel^{5}	Nongbua Pitchaya (T1)	ACDC (T3)	9–1 (A)	30 October 2024	First round

Notes: ^{5} = Player scored 5 goals; (H) = Home team; (A) = Away team

== See also ==
- 2024–25 Thai League 1
- 2024–25 Thai League 2
- 2024–25 Thai League 3
- 2024–25 Thai League 3 Northern Region
- 2024–25 Thai League 3 Central Region
- 2024–25 Thai League 3 Northeastern Region
- 2024–25 Thai League 3 Eastern Region
- 2024–25 Thai League 3 Western Region
- 2024–25 Thai League 3 Southern Region
- 2024–25 Thai League 3 National Championship
- 2024–25 Thai League 3 Cup
- 2024–25 Thai FA Cup
