= 2024 Thailand Semi-pro League =

2nd season of the Thailand Semi-pro League

- Season: 2024
- Dates: 18 February 2024 – 9 June 2024
- Champions: Roi Et PB United
- Promoted: Chattrakan City (Northern region); Roi Et PB United (Northeastern region); Padriew City (Eastern region); Samut Songkhram City (Western region); Yala City (Southern region); Dome (Bangkok Metropolitan region)

The 2024 Thailand Semi-pro League is the second season of the Thailand Semi-pro League, serving as the official fourth tier of the Thai football league system. The league is organized by the Football Association of Thailand (FA Thailand) and managed by Thai League Co., Ltd.

A total of 38 clubs participate in the competition, divided into six regional zones: The Northern and Western regions each consist of 7 clubs, the Northeastern region features 9 clubs, the Eastern region contains 8 clubs, the Southern region consists of 2 clubs, while the Bangkok Metropolitan region contains 5 clubs.

The competition consists of a Regional Stage followed by the National Championship Stage. The regional champions earn promotion to Thai League 3 for the following season and advance to the National Championship Stage to compete for the national title.

== Stadiums and locations ==
=== Northern region ===
Team	Location	Stadium	Coordinates
Chattrakan City	Phitsanulok (Mueang)	Stadium of Pibulsongkram Rajabhat University	16°49′55″N 100°12′47″E
Chiangrai TSC	Chiang Rai (Mueang)	Chiangrai Provincial Stadium	19°54′48″N 99°51′21″E
Lampang Sports School	Lampang (Mueang)	Lampang Provincial Stadium	18°18′09″N 99°28′25″E
Nakhon Sawan	Nakhon Sawan (Mueang)	Nakhon Sawan Provincial Stadium	15°42′36″N 100°06′26″E
Nan	Nan (Mueang)	Nan PAO. Stadium	18°47′33″N 100°46′32″E
Phichit United	Phichit (Mueang)	Phichit Stadium	16°26′35″N 100°19′26″E
Thailand National Sports University Chiangmai Campus	Chiang Mai (Mueang)	Chiangmai City Municipality Stadium	18°48′03″N 98°59′22″E

=== Northeastern region ===
Team	Location	Stadium	Coordinates
Hi-Tech Chaiyaphum United	Chaiyaphum (Mueang)	Stadium of Thailand National Sports University, Chaiyaphum Campus	15°48′29″N 102°01′05″E
Pitchaya Bundit College	Nong Bua Lamphu (Mueang)	Nong Bua Lamphu Provincial Stadium	17°07′48″N 102°25′26″E
Roi Et PB United	Roi Et (Mueang)	Roi Et Provincial Stadium	16°04′27″N 103°39′22″E
Sisaket City	Sisaket (Mueang)	Stadium of Sisaket Rajabhat University	15°07′10″N 104°21′22″E
Siwilai	Maha Sarakham (Mueang)	Stadium of Maha Sarakham Rajabhat University	16°11′55″N 103°16′26″E
Ubon Poly United	Ubon Ratchathani (Mueang)	UMT Stadium	15°15′49″N 104°50′35″E
Udon Banjan United	Udon Thani (Mueang)	Udon Thani SAT Stadium	17°26′54″N 102°54′59″E
Vongchavalitkul University	Nakhon Ratchasima (Mueang)	Stadium of Vongchavalitkul University	15°00′14″N 102°06′50″E
Warin Chamrap	Ubon Ratchathani (Mueang)	Stadium of Ubon Ratchathani Sports School	15°15′04″N 104°50′54″E

=== Eastern region ===
Team	Location	Stadium	Coordinates
Banbueng	Chonburi (Ban Bueng)	Chang Football Park	13°18′09″N 101°12′25″E
Banbueng City	Chonburi (Ban Bueng)	Banbueng Town Municipality Stadium	13°19′06″N 101°06′59″E
Huasamrong Gateway	Chachoengsao (Bang Khla)	Stadium of Rajabhat Rajanagarindra University, Bang Khla Campus	13°47′01″N 101°14′10″E
Nakhon Nayok	Nakhon Nayok (Mueang)	Nakhon Nayok PAO. Stadium	14°12′52″N 101°10′45″E
Padriew City	Chachoengsao (Mueang)	Chachoengsao Provincial Stadium	13°42′07″N 101°02′44″E
Sakaeo Hitech Technology	Sa Kaeo (Mueang)	Sa Kaeo PAO. Stadium	13°46′21″N 102°10′43″E
Sriracha	Chonburi (Si Racha)	Stadium of Rajamangala University of Technology Tawan-ok	13°13′39″N 100°57′29″E
TDIC Angsila Saensuk	Chonburi (Mueang)	Saensuk Town Municipality Stadium	13°18′05″N 100°55′22″E

=== Western region ===
Team	Location	Stadium	Coordinates
Ayothaya Warrior	Phra Nakhon Si Ayutthaya (Bang Pa-in)	Stadium of Udomsilwitthaya School	14°16′38″N 100°34′20″E
Kasetsart Academy	Phra Nakhon Si Ayutthaya (Sena)	Senabodee Stadium	14°19′59″N 100°24′18″E
Lopburi United	Lopburi (Mueang)	Jaifah Academy Stadium	14°48′53″N 100°46′05″E
Phachi City	Phra Nakhon Si Ayutthaya (Phra Nakhon Si Ayutthaya)	Stadium of Rajamangala University of Technology Suvarnabhumi, Huntra Campus	14°22′35″N 100°36′23″E
Ratchaburi United	Ratchaburi (Pak Tho)	Pak Tho Subdistrict Municipality Stadium	13°22′15″N 99°50′51″E
Samui United	Phetchaburi (Tha Yang)	His Majesty the King's 80th Birthday Anniversary Stadium, Tha Yang Subdistrict Municipality	12°57′43″N 99°53′56″E
Samut Songkhram City	Samut Songkhram (Mueang)	Samut Songkhram Stadium	13°24′51″N 100°00′00″E

=== Southern region ===
Team	Location	Stadium	Coordinates
Phuket Rajabhat University	Phuket (Mueang)	Stadium of Phuket Rajabhat University	7°54′46″N 98°23′09″E
Yala City	Yala (Mueang)	Stadium of Thailand National Sports University, Yala Campus	6°33′09″N 101°17′31″E

=== Bangkok Metropolitan region ===
Team	Location	Stadium	Coordinates
BSL United	Pathum Thani (Khlong Luang)	Stadium of Valaya Alongkorn Rajabhat University under the Royal Patronage	14°08′00″N 100°36′25″E
Dome	Pathum Thani (Thanyaburi)	Stadium of Rajamangala University of Technology Thanyaburi	14°02′06″N 100°43′23″E
Futera United	Bangkok (Lat Krabang)	Stadium of King Mongkut's Institute of Technology Ladkrabang	13°43′49″N 100°46′20″E
Look E-San	Bangkok (Lak Si)	NT Stadium	13°53′03″N 100°34′37″E
Sathorn	Bangkok (Sathon)	Stadium of Rajamangala University of Technology Krungthep	13°42′48″N 100°32′13″E

== Regional stage ==
The number of teams in 6 regions including 7 teams in the Northern region, 9 teams in the Northeastern region, 8 teams in the Eastern region, 7 teams in the Western region, 2 teams in the Southern region, and 5 teams in the Bangkok metropolitan region.

=== Northern region ===
League table

Pos	Team	Pld	W	D	L	GF	GA	GD	Pts	Promotion or qualification
1	Chattrakan City (C, P, Q)	6	4	2	0	14	3	+11	14	Promotion to 2024–25 Thai League 3 and qualification to the National Championship stage
2	Chiangrai TSC	6	4	1	1	10	4	+6	13	
3	Phichit United	6	3	1	2	10	3	+7	10	
4	Lampang Sports School	6	2	1	3	5	10	−5	7	
5	Thailand National Sports University Chiangmai Campus	6	1	3	2	4	10	−6	6	
6	Nan	6	1	1	4	2	9	−7	4	
7	Nakhon Sawan	6	0	3	3	2	8	−6	3	

Source: Thai League
Rules for classification: 1) Points; 2) Head-to-head points; 3) Head-to-head goal difference; 4) Head-to-head goal scored; 5) Overall goal difference; 6) Overall goal scored; 7) Fair play points; 8) Play-off without extra time).
(C) Champions; (P) Promoted; (Q) Qualified for the phase indicated

Results

Home \ Away	CTC	CRT	LPS	NSW	NAN	PCU	TSC
Chattrakan City	—	—	—	1–1	—	1–0	4–1
Chiangrai TSC	0–2	—	—	4–1	—	1–0	—
Lampang Sports School	0–5	0–2	—	—	—	0–3	—
Nakhon Sawan	—	—	0–0	—	0–1	—	0–0
Nan	1–1	0–2	0–1	—	—	—	—
Phichit United	—	—	—	2–0	4–0	—	1–1
Thailand National Sports University Chiangmai Campus	—	1–1	0–4	—	1–0	—	—

Source: Thai League
Legend: Blue = home team win; Yellow = draw; Red = away team win.
For upcoming matches, an "a" indicates there is an article about the rivalry between the two participants.

=== Northeastern region ===
League table

Pos	Team	Pld	W	D	L	GF	GA	GD	Pts	Promotion or qualification
1	Roi Et PB United (C, P, Q)	8	6	1	1	18	8	+10	19	Promotion to 2024–25 Thai League 3 and qualification to the National Championship stage
2	Pitchaya Bundit College	8	5	3	0	16	8	+8	18	
3	Sisaket City	8	5	1	2	14	11	+3	16	
4	Udon Banjan United	8	4	1	3	10	7	+3	13	
5	Siwilai	8	3	2	3	9	8	+1	11	
6	Ubon Poly United	8	2	2	4	12	14	−2	8	
7	Warin Chamrap	8	1	3	4	9	15	−6	6	
8	Hi-Tech Chaiyaphum United	8	0	4	4	7	15	−8	4	
9	Vongchavalitkul University	8	0	3	5	6	15	−9	3	

Source: Thai League
Rules for classification: 1) Points; 2) Head-to-head points; 3) Head-to-head goal difference; 4) Head-to-head goal scored; 5) Overall goal difference; 6) Overall goal scored; 7) Fair play points; 8) Play-off without extra time).
(C) Champions; (P) Promoted; (Q) Qualified for the phase indicated

Results

Home \ Away	HCP	PBC	REU	SKC	SWL	UBP	UDB	VCU	WRC
Hi-Tech Chaiyaphum United	—	—	—	0–2	0–1	—	1–1	2–2	—
Pitchaya Bundit College	2–0	—	1–1	—	—	4–3	—	—	4–1
Roi Et PB United	3–0	—	—	—	—	2–1	3–2	—	2–1
Sisaket City	—	1–1	1–5	—	2–1	—	—	4–0	—
Siwilai	—	0–1	2–1	—	—	2–0	—	—	2–2
Ubon Poly United	3–3	—	—	3–1	—	—	0–2	2–0	—
Udon Banjan United	—	1–2	—	0–1	1–0	—	—	1–0	—
Vongchavalitkul University	—	1–1	0–1	—	1–1	—	—	—	2–3
Warin Chamrap	1–1	—	—	1–2	—	0–0	0–2	—	—

Source: Thai League
Legend: Blue = home team win; Yellow = draw; Red = away team win.
For upcoming matches, an "a" indicates there is an article about the rivalry between the two participants.

=== Eastern region ===
League table

Pos	Team	Pld	W	D	L	GF	GA	GD	Pts	Promotion or qualification
1	Padriew City (C, P, Q)	7	5	2	0	14	7	+7	17	Promotion to 2024–25 Thai League 3 and qualification to the National Championship stage
2	Banbueng City	7	5	1	1	15	5	+10	16	
3	Banbueng	7	5	0	2	20	13	+7	15	
4	Sriracha	7	3	1	3	13	12	+1	10	
5	Nakhon Nayok	7	2	2	3	7	8	−1	8	
6	TDIC Angsila Saensuk	7	2	1	4	12	15	−3	7	
7	Sakaeo Hitech Technology	7	1	2	4	11	20	−9	5	
8	Huasamrong Gateway	7	0	1	6	11	23	−12	1	

Source: Thai League
Rules for classification: 1) Points; 2) Head-to-head points; 3) Head-to-head goal difference; 4) Head-to-head goal scored; 5) Overall goal difference; 6) Overall goal scored; 7) Fair play points; 8) Play-off without extra time).
(C) Champions; (P) Promoted; (Q) Qualified for the phase indicated

Results

Home \ Away	BBG	BBC	HGW	NNY	PRC	SHT	SRC	TAS
Banbueng	—	—	—	3–1	2–3	—	—	4–1
Banbueng City	0–1	—	4–1	3–1	—	—	3–1	—
Huasamrong Gateway	3–4	—	—	0–0	—	—	—	2–3
Nakhon Nayok	—	—	—	—	0–1	3–0	2–1	—
Padriew City	—	0–0	3–1	—	—	2–2	—	3–2
Sakaeo Hitech Technology	2–4	1–2	4–3	—	—	—	1–1	—
Sriracha	3–2	—	5–1	—	0–2	—	—	—
TDIC Angsila Saensuk	—	0–3	—	0–0	—	5–1	1–2	—

Source: Thai League
Legend: Blue = home team win; Yellow = draw; Red = away team win.
For upcoming matches, an "a" indicates there is an article about the rivalry between the two participants.

=== Western region ===
League table

Pos	Team	Pld	W	D	L	GF	GA	GD	Pts	Promotion or qualification
1	Samut Songkhram City (C, P, Q)	6	3	2	1	12	6	+6	11 (Note: The head-to-head record is tied; Samut Songkhram City 1 pt, Phachi City 1 pt. Samut Songkhram City is ahead on the overall goals difference.)	Promotion to 2024–25 Thai League 3 and qualification to the National Championship stage
2	Phachi City	6	3	2	1	8	6	+2	11	
3	Lopburi United	6	2	3	1	4	2	+2	9	
4	Kasetsart Academy	6	2	2	2	6	9	−3	8 (Note: Kasetsart Academy ahead on head-to-head points record; Kasetsart Academy 3 pts, Ayothaya Warrior 0 pts.)	
5	Ayothaya Warrior	6	2	2	2	8	6	+2	8	
6	Samui United	6	2	1	3	11	11	0	7	
7	Ratchaburi United	6	0	2	4	3	12	−9	2	

Source: Thai League
Rules for classification: 1) Points; 2) Head-to-head points; 3) Head-to-head goal difference; 4) Head-to-head goal scored; 5) Overall goal difference; 6) Overall goal scored; 7) Fair play points; 8) Play-off without extra time).
(C) Champions; (P) Promoted; (Q) Qualified for the phase indicated
Notes:

Results

Home \ Away	AYW	KSA	LBU	PCC	RBU	SMU	SKM
Ayothaya Warrior	—	—	0–0	—	—	4–1	2–1
Kasetsart Academy	2–1	—	—	1–2	1–1	—	—
Lopburi United	—	0–0	—	—	2–0	—	1–2
Phachi City	2–1	—	0–0	—	—	2–3	—
Ratchaburi United	0–0	—	—	1–2	—	0–4	—
Samui United	—	1–2	0–1	—	—	—	2–2
Samut Songkhram City	—	4–0	—	0–0	3–1	—	—

Source: Thai League
Legend: Blue = home team win; Yellow = draw; Red = away team win.
For upcoming matches, an "a" indicates there is an article about the rivalry between the two participants.

=== Southern region ===
League table

Pos	Team	Pld	W	D	L	GF	GA	GD	Pts	Promotion or qualification
1	Yala City (C, P, Q)	4	3	0	1	6	1	+5	9	Promotion to 2024–25 Thai League 3 and qualification to the National Championship stage
2	Phuket Rajabhat University	4	1	0	3	1	6	−5	3	

Source: Thai League
Rules for classification: 1) Points; 2) Head-to-head points; 3) Head-to-head goal difference; 4) Head-to-head goal scored; 5) Overall goal difference; 6) Overall goal scored; 7) Fair play points; 8) Play-off without extra time).
(C) Champions; (P) Promoted; (Q) Qualified for the phase indicated

Results

Home \ Away	PKR	YLC	PKR	YLC
Phuket Rajabhat University	—	1–0	—	0–3
Yala City	1–0	—	2–0	—

Source: Thai League
Legend: Blue = home team win; Yellow = draw; Red = away team win.
For upcoming matches, an "a" indicates there is an article about the rivalry between the two participants.

=== Bangkok Metropolitan region ===
League table

Pos	Team	Pld	W	D	L	GF	GA	GD	Pts	Promotion or qualification
1	Dome (C, P, Q)	8	7	0	1	36	10	+26	21	Promotion to 2024–25 Thai League 3 and qualification to the National Championship stage
2	Look E-San	8	5	2	1	23	6	+17	17	
3	Futera United	8	3	2	3	20	13	+7	11	
4	Sathorn	8	1	2	5	8	22	−14	5	
5	BSL United	8	1	0	7	5	41	−36	3	

Source: Thai League
Rules for classification: 1) Points; 2) Head-to-head points; 3) Head-to-head goal difference; 4) Head-to-head goal scored; 5) Overall goal difference; 6) Overall goal scored; 7) Fair play points; 8) Play-off without extra time).
(C) Champions; (P) Promoted; (Q) Qualified for the phase indicated

Results

Home \ Away	BSL	DME	FTU	LES	STN
BSL United	—	0–3	0–7	0–4	3–1
Dome	7–1	—	4–2	2–4	4–0
Futera United	6–0	1–4	—	1–1	2–0
Look E-San	8–1	1–2	3–0	—	2–0
Sathorn	5–0	1–10	1–1	0–0	—

Source: Thai League
Legend: Blue = home team win; Yellow = draw; Red = away team win.
For upcoming matches, an "a" indicates there is an article about the rivalry between the two participants.

== National Championship stage ==
The national championship stage is the next stage from the regional stage. 1st place of each zone qualified for this stage by being featured in 2 groups. Teams from the Northern, Northeastern, and Eastern regions would have qualified for the upper group. Meanwhile, teams from the Western, Southern, and Bangkok Metropolitan regions would have qualified for the lower group.

=== Group stage ===
==== Upper region ====
Pos	Team	Pld	W	D	L	GF	GA	GD	Pts	Qualification	REU	CTC	PRC
1	Roi Et PB United (Q)	2	2	0	0	6	1	+5	6	Qualification to the finals	—	—	4–1
2	Chattrakan City	2	1	0	1	1	2	−1	3		0–2	—	—
3	Padriew City	2	0	0	2	1	5	−4	0		—	0–1	—

Source: Thai League
Rules for classification: 1) Points; 2) Head-to-head points; 3) Goal difference; 4) Goals scored;).
(Q) Qualified for the phase indicated
11 May 2024
16:00 UTC+7

Roi Et PB United	4–1	Padriew City
Khamron Phanchaem 17' (o.g.); Thongchai Ratchai 25'; Chutiwat Niraphot 46'; Santirad Weing-in 50'	Report	Natapon Srisawat 75' (pen.)

Roi Et Provincial Stadium,
Mueang, Roi Et
Attendance: 1,200
Referee: Uthai Purase (Thailand)

19 May 2024
18:00 UTC+7

Padriew City	0–1	Chattrakan City
	Report	Chariya Bomtaku 11'

Chachoengsao Provincial Stadium,
Mueang, Chachoengsao
Attendance: 283
Referee: Trin Sahachaipat (Thailand)

25 May 2024
16:00 UTC+7

Chattrakan City	0–2	Roi Et PB United
	Report	Santirad Weing-in 6'; Vichit Singloilom 72'

Stadium of Pibulsongkram Rajabhat University,
Mueang, Phitsanulok
Attendance: 345
Referee: Nattawut Pornchaiwirun (Thailand)

==== Lower region ====
Pos	Team	Pld	W	D	L	GF	GA	GD	Pts	Qualification	DME	SKM	YLC
1	Dome (Q)	2	2	0	0	6	1	+5	6	Qualification to the finals	—	1–0	—
2	Samut Songkhram City	2	0	1	1	1	2	−1	1 (Note: The head-to-head record is tied; Samut Songkhram City 1 pt, Yala City 1 pt. Samut Songkhram City is ahead on the overall goals difference.)		—	—	1–1
3	Yala City	2	0	1	1	2	6	−4	1		1–5	—	—

Source: Thai League
Rules for classification: 1) Points; 2) Head-to-head points; 3) Goal difference; 4) Goals scored;).
(Q) Qualified for the phase indicated
Notes:
12 May 2024
16:00 UTC+7

Samut Songkhram City	1–1	Yala City
Monkon Kingmala 90'	Report	Mahaday Jarong 57'

Samut Songkhram Stadium,
Mueang, Samut Songkhram
Attendance:
Referee: Suthipong Teekhasuk (Thailand)

18 May 2024
16:00 UTC+7

Yala City	1–5	Dome
Suhaimee Salaeh 34'	Report	Thanachot Sonsri 26', 68'; Kittikhom Chadathan 48'; Peerapat Chunhacha 52'; Peerapat Kantha 63'

Stadium of Thailand National Sports University, Yala Campus,
Mueang, Yala
Attendance: 301
Referee: Jiraphan Yodphut (Thailand)

26 May 2024
16:00 UTC+7

Dome	1–0	Samut Songkhram City
Sattawas Inchareon 38'	Report

Stadium of Rajamangala University of Technology Thanyaburi,
Khlong Luang, Pathum Thani
Attendance: 250
Referee: Palathip Homwarn (Thailand)

=== Finals ===
Team 1	Agg.	Team 2	1st leg	2nd leg
Roi Et PB United	6–2	Dome	4–1	2–1

==== 1st leg ====
2 June 2024
16:00 UTC+7

Roi Et PB United	4–1	Dome
Rewat Khumbun 10'; Thongchai Ratchai 69'; Sakda Manchart 79', 90+3'	Report	Thanachot Sonsri 54'

Roi Et Provincial Stadium,
Mueang, Roi Et
Attendance:
Referee: Teeramate Pooprang (Thailand)

Roi Et PB United	Dome

Lineups:
GK	30	(Thailand) Chalermkeat Pootoya
CB	4	(Thailand) Watcharakon Phochai		(yellow card) 82'
CB	5	(Thailand) Suphakrit Dongchan
CB	19	(Thailand) Suppalap Tanomlap			(substituted off) 87'
RM	13	(Thailand) Nattapakun Paingpala
CM	49	(Thailand) Sakda Manchart	79', 90+3'
CM	6	(Thailand) Supaphorn Prompinit
LM	26	(Thailand) Wutthichai Tongsaen			(substituted off) 60'
RF	16	(Thailand) Rewat Khumbun	10'		(substituted off) 60'
CF	10	(Thailand) Thongchai Ratchai (c)	69'		(substituted off) 87'
LF	8	(Thailand) Santirad Weing-in			(substituted off) 56'
Substitutes:
GK	18	(Thailand) Worawut Srisuwo
MF	17	(Thailand) Wanwis Doemthomram
MF	41	(Thailand) Pongsathon Jitpim			(substituted on) 87'
MF	88	(Thailand) Chutiwat Niraphot			(substituted on) 60'
FW	9	(Thailand) Saichon Magmesoog			(substituted on) 56'
FW	32	(Thailand) Vichit Singloilom			(substituted on) 87'
FW	44	(Thailand) Thammawat Yenram			(substituted on) 60'
FW	89	(Thailand) Phuwadon Buranaaudom
Head Coach:
(Thailand) Pramoul Thinkatork

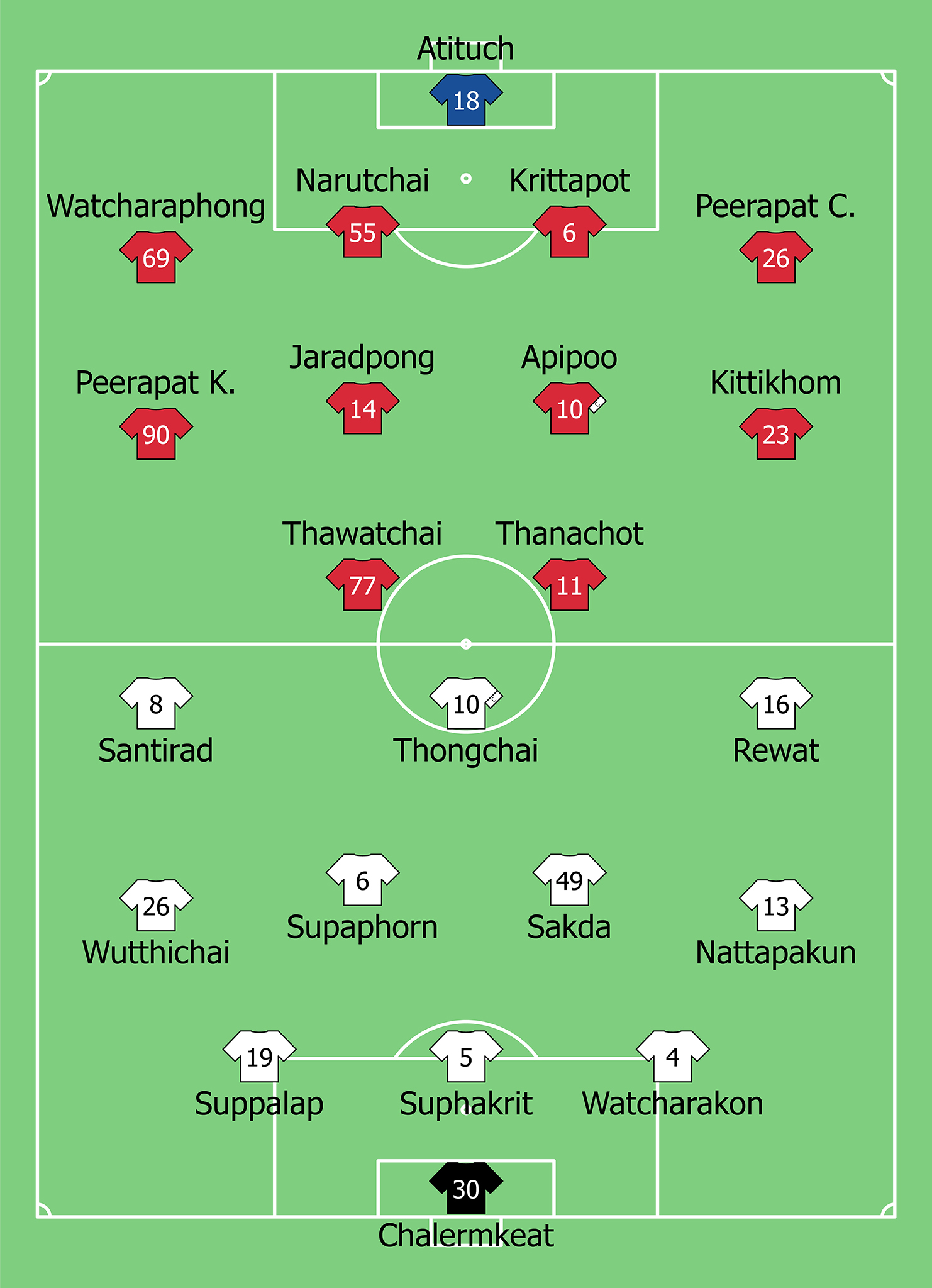

Lineups:
GK	18	(Thailand) Atituch Chankar
RB	69	(Thailand) Watcharaphong Khongchuai			(substituted off) 77'
CB	55	(Thailand) Narutchai Nimboon
CB	6	(Thailand) Krittapot Kongla			(substituted off) 77'
LB	26	(Thailand) Peerapat Chunhacha
RM	90	(Thailand) Peerapat Kantha
CM	14	(Thailand) Jaradpong Niyomrat
CM	10	(Thailand) Apipoo Suntornpanavej (c)			(substituted off) 89'
LM	23	(Thailand) Kittikhom Chadathan			(substituted off) 46'
CF	77	(Thailand) Thawatchai Bupasiri			(substituted off) 89'
CF	11	(Thailand) Thanachot Sonsri	54'	(yellow card) 33'
Substitutes:
GK	25	(Thailand) Wisanu Chamnongkan
DF	16	(Thailand) Nattawut Ninpround			(substituted on) 89'
DF	17	(Thailand) Sattawas Inchareon
DF	21	(Thailand) Phanawat Limwanasthian			(substituted on) 77'
MF	19	(Thailand) Sakthip Boonsiriroj
MF	56	(Thailand) Prathan Senala
MF	89	(Thailand) Apirawit Funta			(substituted on) 89'
FW	7	(Thailand) Wuthichai Nualloi		(yellow card) 72'	(substituted on) 46'
FW	9	(Thailand) Ratchanon Thisawet			(substituted on) 77'
Head Coach:
(Thailand) Prateep Senala

==== 2nd leg ====
9 June 2024
16:00 UTC+7

Dome	1–2	Roi Et PB United
Ratchanon Thisawet 59'	Report	Suphakrit Dongchan 45+4'; Saichon Magmesoog 57'

Stadium of Bangkok University,
Khlong Luang, Pathum Thani
Attendance:
Referee: Pichit Thongjanmoon (Thailand)

Dome	Roi Et PB United

Lineups:
GK	18	(Thailand) Atituch Chankar
RB	69	(Thailand) Watcharaphong Khongchuai (c)
CB	21	(Thailand) Phanawat Limwanasthian
CB	6	(Thailand) Krittapot Kongla			(substituted off) 58'
LB	26	(Thailand) Peerapat Chunhacha
CM	14	(Thailand) Jaradpong Niyomrat
CM	77	(Thailand) Thawatchai Bupasiri			(substituted off) 72'
AM	55	(Thailand) Narutchai Nimboon
RF	11	(Thailand) Thanchot Sonsri
CF	46	(Thailand) Karintron Phakum			(substituted off) 58'
LF	90	(Thailand) Peerapat Kantha			(substituted off) 58'
Substitutes:
GK	25	(Thailand) Wisanu Chamnongkan
DF	16	(Thailand) Nattawut Ninpround
DF	33	(Thailand) Teeraporn Atawongsa		(yellow card) 78'	(substituted on) 58'
MF	10	(Thailand) Apipoo Suntornpanavej
MF	56	(Thailand) Prathan Senala
MF	89	(Thailand) Apirawit Funta		(yellow card) 61'	(substituted on) 58'
FW	7	(Thailand) Wuthichai Nualloi			(substituted on) 72'
FW	9	(Thailand) Ratchanon Thisawet	59'		(substituted on) 58'
FW	23	(Thailand) Kittikhom Chadathan
Head Coach:
(Thailand) Prateep Senala

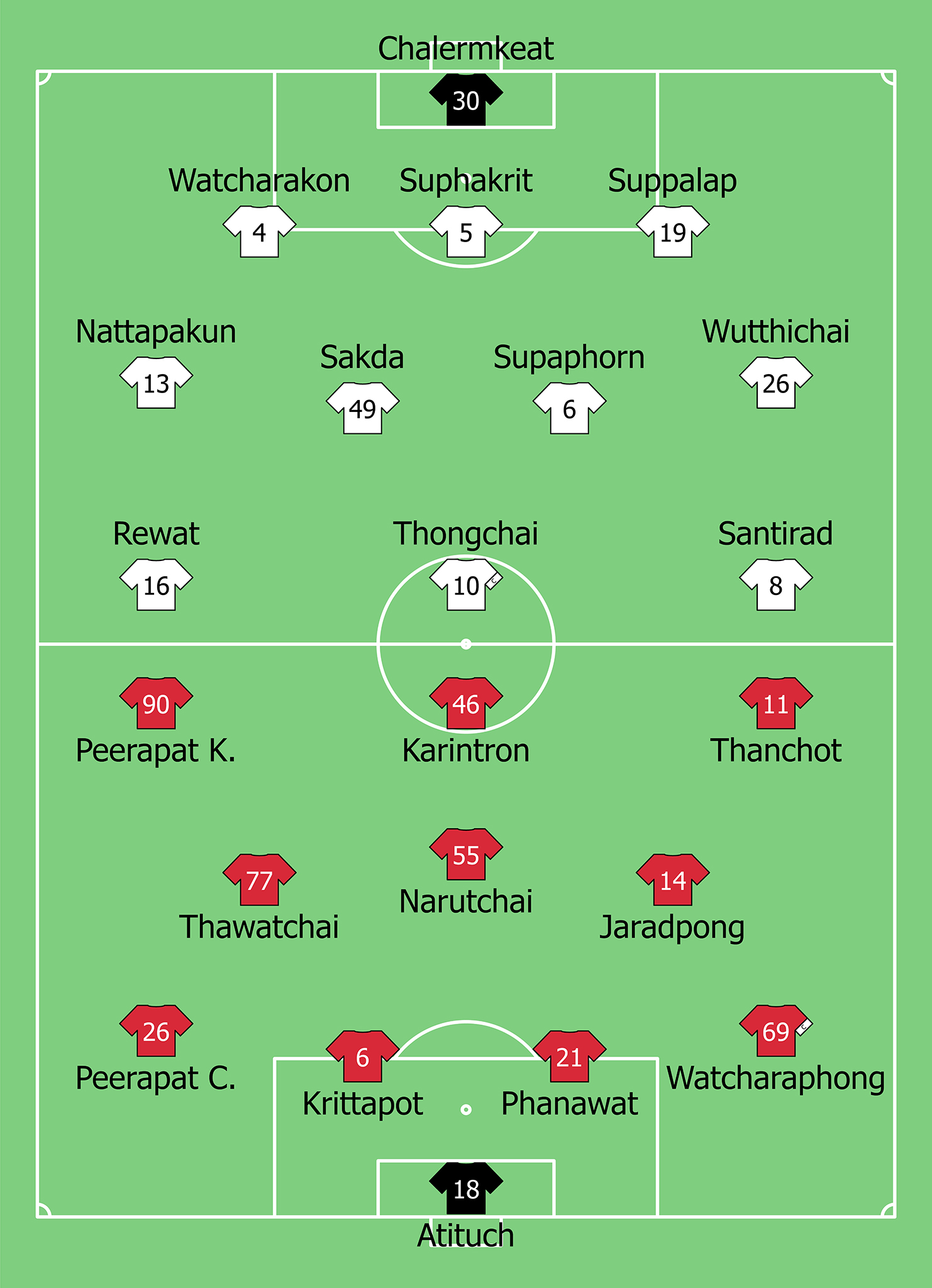

Lineups:
GK	30	(Thailand) Chalermkeat Pootoya
CB	4	(Thailand) Watcharakon Phochai
CB	5	(Thailand) Suphakrit Dongchan	45+4'		(substituted off) 85'
CB	19	(Thailand) Suppalap Tanomlap		(yellow card) 65'
RM	13	(Thailand) Nattapakun Paingpala		(yellow card) 87'
CM	49	(Thailand) Sakda Manchart
CM	6	(Thailand) Supaphorn Prompinit			(substituted off) 90+4'
LM	26	(Thailand) Wutthichai Tongsaen			(substituted off) 46'
RF	16	(Thailand) Rewat Khumbun		(yellow card) 37'	(substituted off) 46'
CF	10	(Thailand) Thongchai Ratchai (c)
LF	8	(Thailand) Santirad Weing-in			(substituted off) 56'
Substitutes:
GK	18	(Thailand) Worawut Srisuwo
MF	11	(Thailand) Sudhkat Phomduang		(yellow card) 74'	(substituted on) 56'
MF	17	(Thailand) Wanwis Doemthomram			(substituted on) 90+4'
MF	41	(Thailand) Pongsathon Jitpim			(substituted on) 85'
MF	88	(Thailand) Chutiwat Niraphot
FW	9	(Thailand) Saichon Magmesoog	57'		(substituted on) 46'
FW	32	(Thailand) Vichit Singloilom
FW	44	(Thailand) Thammawat Yenram			(substituted on) 46'
FW	89	(Thailand) Phuwadon Buranaaudom
Head Coach:
(Thailand) Pramoul Thinkatork

Roi Et PB United won 6–2 on aggregate.

== See also ==
- 2023–24 Thai League 1
- 2023–24 Thai League 2
- 2023–24 Thai League 3
- 2023–24 Thai League 3 Northern Region
- 2023–24 Thai League 3 Northeastern Region
- 2023–24 Thai League 3 Eastern Region
- 2023–24 Thai League 3 Western Region
- 2023–24 Thai League 3 Southern Region
- 2023–24 Thai League 3 Bangkok Metropolitan Region
- 2023–24 Thai League 3 National Championship
- 2023–24 Thai FA Cup
- 2023–24 Thai League Cup
- 2023–24 Thai League 3 Cup
- 2023 Thailand Champions Cup
