= 2026–27 Thai League 3 Northeastern Region =

Thai League 3 Northeastern Region
- Season: 2026–27
- Dates: 18 September 2026 – 20 March 2027

The 2026–27 Thai League 3 Northeastern Region was part of the 2026–27 Thai League 3 Regional Stage, consisting of 12 clubs located in the northeastern region (Isan) of Thailand. The season commenced on 18 September 2026, with clubs competing in a round-robin format featuring home-and-away matches. The Regional Stage concluded on 20 March 2027, with the top two clubs advancing to the National Championship Stage, while the bottom-placed club was relegated to the Thailand Semi-pro League for the following season.

== Seasonal Changes ==
The 2026–27 Thai League 3 Northeastern Region retains 12 clubs, unchanged from the previous season. BYD Auto remains the title sponsor, with matches broadcast on AIS Play. The criteria for determining the standings have also been revised, with overall goal difference replacing head-to-head results as the primary tiebreaker.

=== Promotions from Thailand Semi-pro League ===
The following two clubs were promoted from the 2026 Thailand Semi-pro League to the 2026–27 Thai League 3 Northeastern Region:

- Esan Fighter – promoted as regional champions.
- Pitchaya Bundit College – promoted as runners-up under a special quota.

=== Promotion to Thai League 2 ===
Muang Loei United was promoted to the 2026–27 Thai League 2 after finishing fourth in the 2025–26 Thai League 3 National Championship Stage. The club originally finished outside the promotion places. Still, it was awarded a promotion place after national champions Nara United failed to obtain a Thai League 2 club licence and was therefore ineligible to participate in the 2026–27 season.

=== Relegation to Thailand Semi-pro League ===
Surin Khong Chee Mool was relegated to the 2027 Thailand Semi-pro League after finishing bottom of the 2025–26 Thai League 3 Northeastern Region.

=== Club name and logo changes ===
Roi Et PB United introduced a new club logo for the 2026–27 season, replacing the previous red-and-gold design with a predominantly purple-and-white design while retaining the club's overall shield-shaped identity.

== Teams ==
=== Number of teams by province ===
Position	Province	Number	Teams
1	Udon Thani	3	Esan Fighter, Udon Banjan United, and Udon United
2	Khon Kaen	2	Khon Kaen and Khon Kaen Mordindang
2	Ubon Ratchathani	2	EUMT and Ubon Kruanapat
4	Nakhon Ratchasima	1	Korat City
4	Nong Bua Lamphu	1	Pitchaya Bundit College
4	Roi Et	1	Roi Et PB United
4	Surin	1	Surin City
4	Yasothon	1	Yasothon

=== Stadiums and locations ===
Team	Location	Stadium	Coordinates
Esan Fighter	Udon Thani (Mueang)	Udon Thani SAT Stadium	17°26′54″N 102°54′59″E
EUMT	Ubon Ratchathani (Mueang)	UMT Stadium	15°15′49″N 104°50′35″E
Khon Kaen	Khon Kaen (Mueang)	Khon Kaen PAO Stadium	16°24′46″N 102°49′40″E
Khon Kaen Mordindang	Khon Kaen (Mueang)	Stadium of Khon Kaen University	16°28′36″N 102°49′04″E
Korat City	Nakhon Ratchasima (Mueang)	Stadium of Nakhon Ratchasima Rajabhat University	14°59′07″N 102°06′53″E
Pitchaya Bundit College	Nong Bua Lamphu (Mueang)	Nong Bua Lamphu Provincial Stadium	17°07′48″N 102°25′26″E
Roi Et PB United	Roi Et (Mueang)	Roi Et Provincial Stadium	16°04′27″N 103°39′22″E
Surin City	Surin (Mueang)	Stadium of Rajamangala University of Technology Isan, Surin Campus	14°51′15″N 103°28′53″E
Ubon Kruanapat	Ubon Ratchathani (Mueang)	Stadium of Ubon Ratchathani Rajabhat University	15°14′45″N 104°50′51″E
Udon Banjan United	Udon Thani (Mueang)	Stadium of Thailand National Sports University, Udon Thani Campus	17°24′20″N 102°46′09″E
Udon United	Udon Thani (Mueang)	Stadium of Thailand National Sports University, Udon Thani Campus	17°24′20″N 102°46′09″E
Yasothon	Yasothon (Mueang)	Yasothon PAO Stadium	15°46′58″N 104°09′06″E

=== Foreign players ===
A T3 team can register 3 foreign players from around the world. A team can field 3 foreign players in each game.

== League table ==
=== Standings ===
Pos	Team	Pld	W	D	L	GF	GA	GD	Pts	Qualification or relegation
1	Udon United	9	6	3	0	21	6	+15	21	Qualification to the National Championship stage
2	Udon Banjan United	9	5	4	0	19	8	+11	19	Qualification to the National Championship stage
3	Khon Kaen	9	3	6	0	14	6	+8	15	
4	Roi Et PB United	9	3	5	1	8	5	+3	14	
5	Khon Kaen Mordindang	9	4	1	4	9	15	−6	13	
6	EUMT	9	3	3	3	11	17	−6	12	
7	Pitchaya Bundit College	9	3	2	4	17	13	+4	11	
8	Korat City	9	2	5	2	6	8	−2	11	
9	Yasothon	9	2	2	5	7	14	−7	8	
10	Ubon Kruanapat	9	1	4	4	10	15	−5	7	
11	Surin City	9	2	1	6	11	18	−7	7	
12	Esan Fighter	9	1	2	6	11	19	−8	5	Relegation to the Thailand Semi-pro League

Updated to match(es) played on 12 November 2026. Source: Thai League
Rules for classification: 1) Points; 2) Overall goal difference; 3) Overall goals scored; 4) Head-to-head points; 5) Head-to-head goal difference; 6) Head-to-head goals scored; 7) Fair play points.

=== Positions by round ===
Team ╲ Round	1	2	3	4	5	6	7	8	9	10	11	12	13	14	15	16	17	18	19	20	21	22
Udon United	6	5	5	2	2	1	1	1	1													
Udon Banjan United	2	1	1	1	1	2	2	2	2													
Khon Kaen	5	4	4	3	4	4	5	3	3													
Roi Et PB United	4	2	2	5	3	3	3	4	4													
Khon Kaen Mordindang	12	12	11	9	10	12	8	7	5													
EUMT	3	8	8	10	7	7	7	8	6													
Pitchaya Bundit College	1	6	6	6	6	6	4	5	7													
Korat City	7	3	3	4	5	5	6	6	8													
Yasothon	10	7	7	7	9	8	10	11	9													
Ubon Kruanapat	8	9	10	11	11	9	11	9	10													
Surin City	11	11	12	12	12	11	12	12	11													
Esan Fighter	9	10	9	8	8	10	9	10	12													

Source: Thai League
= Qualification to the National Championship stage; = Relegation to the Thailand Semi-pro League

=== Results by round ===
Team ╲ Round	1	2	3	4	5	6	7	8	9	10	11	12	13	14	15	16	17	18	19	20	21	22
Udon United	D	W	D	W	W	W	W	W	D													
Udon Banjan United	W	W	D	W	W	D	D	W	D													
Khon Kaen	D	W	D	W	D	D	D	W	D													
Roi Et PB United	W	W	D	L	W	D	D	D	D													
Khon Kaen Mordindang	L	L	D	W	L	L	W	W	W													
EUMT	W	L	D	L	D	D	W	L	W													
Pitchaya Bundit College	W	L	D	L	D	W	W	L	L													
Korat City	D	W	D	W	D	D	L	D	L													
Yasothon	L	W	D	L	L	D	L	L	W													
Ubon Kruanapat	D	L	D	D	L	D	L	W	L													
Surin City	L	L	L	L	W	D	L	L	W													
Esan Fighter	L	L	W	D	L	L	D	L	L													

Source: Thai League
W = Won; D = Drawn; L = Lost

=== Results ===
Home \ Away	ESF	EUM	KKN	KKM	KRC	PBC	REU	SRC	UBK	UDB	UDU	YST
Esan Fighter	—		0–2	1–2				3–2			0–2	1–3
EUMT	3–2	—		0–0	1–1	2–1						2–0
Khon Kaen			—			1–1			1–1	1–1	2–2	
Khon Kaen Mordindang				—	2–0		1–0	2–1				0–1
Korat City			0–0		—		0–0		0–0			1–0
Pitchaya Bundit College	3–2			4–0	4–0	—				1–2		
Roi Et PB United	1–1	2–0	0–0				—		2–1		0–0	
Surin City			1–4		0–3		1–1	—	1–0		0–1	
Ubon Kruanapat	1–1	2–2				3–1			—	2–5		
Udon Banjan United		2–1		4–0	1–1			3–1		—		
Udon United		7–0		4–2		2–1			2–0	1–1	—	
Yasothon			0–3			1–1	1–2	1–4		0–0		—

Updated to match(es) played on 12 November 2026. Source: Thai League
Legend: Blue = home team win; Yellow = draw; Red = away team win.
For upcoming matches, an "a" indicates there is an article about the rivalry between the two participants.
