= Amir Seyedbagher Rezaei =

Iranian footballer

Personal information
- Full name: Amir Seyedbagher Rezaei
- Place of birth: Iran

Youth career
- –2011: Shirin Faraz

Senior career*
Years	Team	Apps	(Gls)
2011–12	Shirin Faraz	14	(4)
2012–13	Steel Azin F.C.(23 )	0	(0)
2013–14	Roi Et United F.C.	23	(6)
2014–15	Udon Thani F.C.	21	(8)
2015–16	Customs United F.C.	13	(3)
2016–17	krabi fc	5	(1)
- * Club domestic league appearances and goals as of 2016(UTC) ‡ National team caps and goals as of June 2016

Amir Seyedbagher Rezaei (born 19 September 1987) is an Iranian footballer who plays for Shirin Faraz in the IPL.

== Club career ==
Seyedbagher Rezaei joined Shirin Faraz in 2010

=== Club career statistics ===
As of 2 September 2015

Club performance			League		Cup		Continental		Total			
Season	Club	League	Apps	Goals	Apps	Goals	Apps	Goals	Apps	Goals		
Iran			League		Hazfi Cup		Asia		Total			
2011-12	Shirin Faraz	Persian Gulf Cup	17	4			-	-				
2012-13	Steel Azin	Persian Gulf Cup	22	3			-	-				
2013-14	Roi Et United F.C.	Thai Division 1 League	17	6			-	-				
2014-15	Udon Thani F.C.	Thai Division 1 League	19	8			-	-				
2015-16	Customs United F.C.	Thai Division 1 League	16	3			-	-				
2016-17	Saipa F.C.	Persian Gulf Cup	9	2			-	-			Total	Iran
Career total			100	26			0	0				
