= Supaphorn Prompinit =

Thai footballer (born 1989)

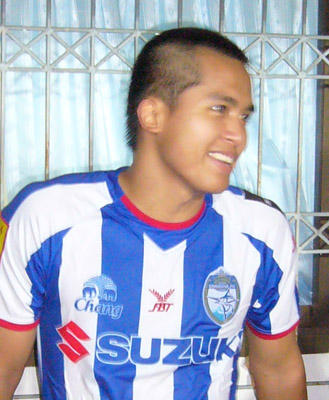

Personal information
- Date of birth: 3 March 1989 (age 37)
- Place of birth: Sakon Nakhon, Thailand
- Height: 1.70 m (5 ft 7 in)
- Position: Attacking midfielder

Senior career*
Years	Team	Apps	(Gls)
2008–2011	Sriracha	34	(5)
2012–2013	Chonburi	14	(1)
2013	→ Suphanburi (loan)	19	(1)
2014	Army United	2	(0)
2015	Port	1	(0)
2015	Chiangmai	16	(1)
2016–2017	Trat	21	(2)
2023	Thap Luang United	10	(0)
2024	Roi Et PB United	11	(0)
2024	Chattrakan City	9	(0)
2024	Roi Et PB United	0	(0)

International career
2008–2009	Thailand U19		
- * Club domestic league appearances and goals as of 11 November 2023

Supaphorn Prompinit (Thai: สุภภรณ์ พรหมพินิจ; born March 3, 1989), also spelled Suphaphorn Phromphinit, is a Thai professional footballer.

== Honours ==
=== Club ===
Sriracha

- Thai Division 1 League champions: 2010

Chonburi

- Kor Royal Cup winner: 2012
