= Jiraniti Thalangjit =

Thai footballer (born 1984)

Personal information
- Full name: Jiraniti Thalangjit
- Date of birth: 18 November 1984 (age 41)
- Place of birth: Mahasarakham, Thailand
- Height: 1.82 m (5 ft 11 1/2 in)
- Position: Defender

Team information
- Current team: Roi Et United
- Number: 35

Senior career*
Years	Team	Apps	(Gls)
2007–2008	Samut Songkhram	27	(0)
2009	Mahasarakham	18	(0)
2010–	Roi Et United	12	(1)
- * Club domestic league appearances and goals as of 22 June 2008

Jiraniti Thalangjit (Thai จิรนิติ แถลงจิตร ), born 18 November 1984) is a Thai footballer. He plays for Regional League Division 2 clubside Roi Et United.
