= Pankkee Arena =

Football stadium in Roi Et, Thailand

- Interactive map of Pankkee Arena
- Full name: Pankkee Arena
- Location: Thawat Buri, Roi Et, Thailand
- Coordinates: 16°03′01″N 103°43′20″E
- Owner: Roi Et CF
- Operator: Roi Et CF
- Capacity: 5,000
- Surface: Grass

Construction
- Built: 2013
- Opened: 1 April 2017

Tenant
- Roi Et CF

Pankkee Arena (Thai: สนามภังค์คี อารีน่า) is a football stadium in Roi Et, Thailand. The stadium is the home stadium of Roi Et United of Thai League 4. The Arena opened for football match competition on 1 April 2017.
