= Jeerachai Ladadok =

Thai footballer

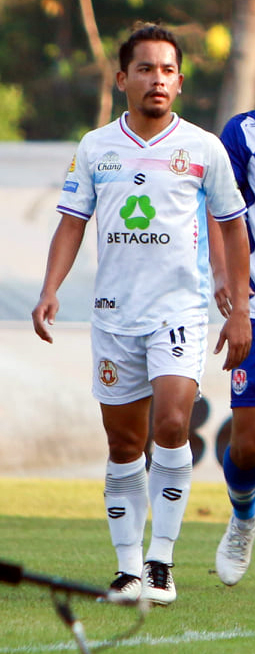
- Jeerachai Ladadok playing for Lamphun Warriors.

Personal information
- Full name: Jeerachai Ladadok
- Date of birth: 21 April 1992 (age 34)
- Place of birth: Thailand
- Height: 1.68 m (5 ft 6 in)
- Position: Left winger

Team information
- Current team: Chattrakan City
- Number: 2

Senior career*
Years	Team	Apps	(Gls)
2015	Chachoengsao		
2016	Super Power Samut Prakarn	9	(1)
2016–2019	Sukhothai	11	(0)
2017–2019	→ Lampang (loan)	5	(0)
2020–2021	Lampang	25	(0)
2021–2022	Lamphun Warriors	16	(1)
2022–2025	Phitsanulok	53	(6)
2025–	Chattrakan City	18	(0)
- * Club domestic league appearances and goals as of 25 May 2022

Jeerachai Ladadok (Thai: จีราชัย ละดาดก) is a Thai professional footballer who is currently playing for Chattrakan City in Thai League 3 as a left-winger.

== Honours ==
=== Club ===
Lamphun Warriors

- Thai League 2 (1): 2021–22
