= Pitchaya Bundit College F.C. =

Pitchaya Bundit College วิทยาลัยพิชญบัณฑิต
- Full name: Pitchaya Bundit College Football Club
- Nicknames: PBC (พีบีซี)
- Founded: 2017; 9 years ago
- Ground: Nong Bua Lamphu Provincial Stadium; Nong Bua Lamphu, Thailand
- Capacity: 4,000
- Coordinates: 17°07′48″N 102°25′26″E
- Owner(s): Pitchayabundit Football Club Co., Ltd.
- Chairman: Suthep Phoomongkolsuriya
- Head coach: Supanit Suparattanakhul
- League: Thai League 3
- 2026: Thailand Semi-pro League, 2nd of 11 in the Northeastern region
- Website: Facebook

Pitchaya Bundit College Football Club (Thai: สโมสรฟุตบอล วิทยาลัยพิชญบัณฑิต), is a Thai professional football club affiliated with Pitchaya Bundit College, based in Nong Bua Lamphu, Thailand. The club currently competes in the Thai League 3, the third tier of the Thai football league system, and plays in the Northeastern region.

== History ==
Pitchaya Bundit College's football team represents the college in both Football Association of Thailand club competitions and school and university football tournaments. The team first entered the association's club competition system in 2017, when it participated in the Thailand Amateur League. The college has also continued to field teams under its name in various school and university competitions, including inter-school and university football tournaments.

After several seasons away from the association's club competitions, the club returned to the Thailand Amateur League in 2022. Following the establishment of the Thailand Semi-pro League in 2023, Pitchaya Bundit College competed in the competition from 2023 to 2026. In 2026, the club earned promotion to Thai League 3 and obtained the required club licence to compete in professional football for the 2026–27 season.

== Stadium and locations ==
Coordinates	Location	Stadium	Year
17°11′39″N 102°26′08″E	Mueang, Nong Bua Lamphu	Nongbua Pitchaya Training Ground	2022
17°07′48″N 102°25′26″E	Mueang, Nong Bua Lamphu	Nong Bua Lamphu Provincial Stadium	2023 – 2024
17°11′52″N 102°26′00″E	Mueang, Nong Bua Lamphu	Pitchaya Stadium	2025 – 2026
17°07′48″N 102°25′26″E	Mueang, Nong Bua Lamphu	Nong Bua Lamphu Provincial Stadium	2026 – present

== Season by season record ==
Season	League									FA Cup	League Cup	T3 Cup	Top goalscorer	
Season	Division	P	W	D	L	F	A	Pts	Pos	FA Cup	League Cup	T3 Cup	Name	Goals
2017	TA Northeast	5	2	0	3	13	11	6	4th	Opted out	Ineligible	Ineligible	(Thailand) Patiphon Phetwiset, (Thailand) Sirapop Parata, (Thailand) Sitthikorn Klahan	2
2022	TA Northeast	2	1	0	1	4	4	3	2nd	Opted out	Ineligible	Ineligible	(Thailand) Anthony Rawangklang, (Thailand) Chirawat Phiuon, (Thailand) Pornsawan Somsanit	1
2023	TS Northeast	9	3	3	3	7	9	12	6th	Opted out	Ineligible	Ineligible	(Thailand) Anuchit Somphakdee	3
2024	TS Northeast	8	5	3	0	16	8	18	2nd	Opted out	Ineligible	Ineligible	(Thailand) Niwat Nonkao	5
2025	TS Northeast	11	7	2	2	18	7	23	3rd	Opted out	Ineligible	Ineligible	(Thailand) Thanakrit Jampalee	4
2026	TS Northeast	6	5	0	1	21	4	15	2nd	Opted out	Ineligible	Ineligible	(Thailand) Kamonchai Somsuk, (Thailand) Naratip Kittikananurak, (Thailand) Pornsawan Somsanit	5
2026–27	T3 Northeast										QR2			

Champions	Runners-up	Promoted	Relegated

- P = Played
- W = Games won
- D = Games drawn
- L = Games lost
- F = Goals for
- A = Goals against
- Pts = Points
- Pos = Final position

- QR1 = First Qualifying Round
- QR2 = Second Qualifying Round
- R1 = Round 1
- R2 = Round 2
- R3 = Round 3
- R4 = Round 4

- R5 = Round 5
- R6 = Round 6
- QF = Quarter-finals
- SF = Semi-finals
- RU = Runners-up
- W = Winners

== Players ==
=== Current squad ===
As of

Note: Flags indicate national team as defined under FIFA eligibility rules; some limited exceptions apply. Players may hold more than one non-FIFA nationality.

No. / Pos. / Nation / Player	No. / Pos. / Nation / Player
