= Phitchanon Chanluang =

Thai footballer

Personal information
- Full name: Phitchanon Chanluang
- Date of birth: 7 April 1997 (age 29)
- Place of birth: Chiang Mai, Thailand
- Position: Forward

Team information
- Current team: Rasisalai United
- Number: 22

Senior career*
Years	Team	Apps	(Gls)
2013–2016	Chiangrai United	1	(0)
2016	Phayao		
2017–2019	Chiangrai City	16	(4)
2020–2022	Phrae United	32	(6)
2022–2023	Rongseemaechaithanachotiwat Phayao	11	(5)
2023–2024	North Bangkok University	26	(9)
2024	Samut Prakan City	13	(4)
2025	Nakhon Si United	5	(0)
2025	Maejo United	8	(0)
2026–	Rasisalai United	8	(0)
- * Club domestic league appearances and goals as of 6 April 2026

Phitchanon Chanluang (Thai: พิชชานนท์ จันทร์หลวง, born April 7, 1997) is a Thai professional footballer who plays as a forward for Thai League 2 club Rasisalai United.

== Honours ==
=== Club ===
Rasisalai United FC

- Thai League 2 : 2025–26
