= Chattrakan City F.C. =

Thai football club

Chattrakan City ชาติตระการ ซิตี้
- Full name: Chattrakan City Football Club
- Nicknames: The killer mountains (คีรีพิฆาต)
- Founded: 2021; 5 years ago
- Ground: Stadium of Pibulsongkram Rajabhat University; Phitsanulok, Thailand
- Capacity: 2,000
- Coordinates: 16°49′54″N 100°12′47″E
- Chairman: Anuchit Udompakdee
- Head coach: Ronachai Jinaket
- League: Thai League 3
- 2025–26: Thai League 3, 9th of 12 in the Northern region
- Website: https://www.facebook.com/CTKCITYFC

Chattrakan City Football Club (Thai: สโมสรฟุตบอล ชาติตระการ ซิตี้) is a Thai football club based in Mueang, Phitsanulok, Thailand. The club is currently playing in the Thai League 3 Northern region.

== History ==
In 2021, the club was established.

In early 2024, the club competed in Thailand Semi-pro League Northern region finished in 1st place of the region, promoted to the Thai League 3.

== Stadium and locations ==
Coordinates	Location	Stadium	Year
16°49′54″N 100°12′47″E	Mueang, Phitsanulok	Stadium of Pibulsongkram Rajabhat University	2024 – present

== Season by season record ==
Season	League									FA Cup	League Cup	T3 Cup	Top goalscorer	
Season	Division	P	W	D	L	F	A	Pts	Pos	FA Cup	League Cup	T3 Cup	Name	Goals
2024	TS North	6	4	2	0	14	3	14	1st	R1	Ineligible		(Thailand) Chariya Bomtaku, (Thailand) Punsa Hnunumkum, (Thailand) Thanawat Lekthong	3
2024–25	T3 North	20	5	5	10	21	30	20	10th	Opted out	QR1	LP	(Thailand) Nakul Pinthong	4
2025–26	T3 North	22	7	6	9	17	22	27	9th	QR	QRP	QF	(Saint Kitts and Nevis) Tishan Tajahni Hanley	5
2026–27	T3 North										QR1			

Champions	Runners-up	Promoted	Relegated

- P = Played
- W = Games won
- D = Games drawn
- L = Games lost
- F = Goals for
- A = Goals against
- Pts = Points
- Pos = Final position
- QR1 = First Qualifying Round
- QR2 = Second Qualifying Round
- R1 = Round 1
- R2 = Round 2
- R3 = Round 3
- R4 = Round 4
- R5 = Round 5
- R6 = Round 6
- QF = Quarter-finals
- SF = Semi-finals
- RU = Runners-up
- W = Winners

== Players ==
=== Current squad ===
As of 18 May 2026

Note: Flags indicate national team as defined under FIFA eligibility rules; some limited exceptions apply. Players may hold more than one non-FIFA nationality.

No.	Pos.	Nation	Player
4	MF	THA	Khomkrit Santawong
6	DF	THA	Kitjapon Santan
8	MF	THA	Rattanachai Nualkham
9	MF	JPN	Masahiro Fujiwara
10	FW	SKN	Tishan Tajahni Hanley
11	FW	THA	Weerawat Konsumbut
12	FW	THA	Jetsada Thapphueng
13	GK	THA	Pharit Galapackdee
14	MF	THA	Nakun Pinthong
15	DF	THA	Chindanai Wopngphasert
16	DF	THA	Phisan Soawwadi
17	DF	THA	Sutthiwat Sarak
18	MF	THA	Anawin Jujeen

No.	Pos.	Nation	Player
19	FW	NGA	Ajayi Opeyemi Korede
20	MF	THA	Tanawat Lekthong
24	DF	THA	Peerakan Timkjib
31	GK	THA	Thanakorn Premthong
39	GK	THA	Suracha Nokthongauthai
43	FW	THA	Saran Tadtiang
44	DF	THA	Chirawat Dingam
49	MF	THA	KIttipong Thapthim
54	MF	THA	Phatsakon Fueangfung
59	DF	THA	Nonthakon Arngkaeo
69	GK	THA	Chaiwat Inmek
71	MF	THA	Naruephat Noisomuaong
88	MF	THA	Piyadanai Prasert
90	FW	THA	Supakorn Narknoi
92	MF	THA	Nakharin Pholrach

== Coaching staff ==
Position	Name
Head Coach	(Thailand) Ronachai Jinaket
Assistant Coach	(Thailand) Akkaraphan Santipromwong
Goalkeeper Coach	(Thailand)
Fitness Coach	(Thailand)
Video Analyst	(Thailand)
Doctor	(Thailand)
Physiotherapists	(Thailand)
Media Officer	(Thailand)
Team Staff	(Thailand)
