= Narutchai Nimboon =

Thai footballer

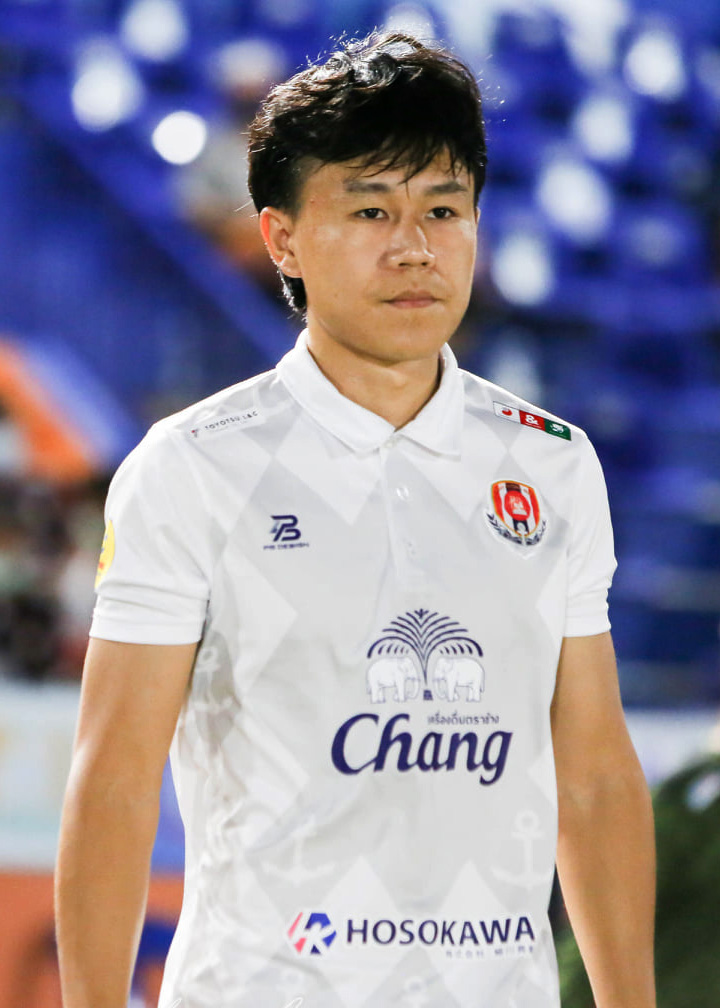
- Nimboon with Navy in 2022

Personal information
- Full name: Narutchai Nimboon
- Date of birth: 24 May 1995 (age 31)
- Place of birth: Bangkok, Thailand
- Height: 1.80 m (5 ft 11 in)
- Position: Defensive midfielder

Youth career
- 2010–2014: Bangkok Christian College

Senior career*
Years	Team	Apps	(Gls)
2014–2015	BCC Tero		
2015–2018	Chainat Hornbill		
2019	Simork		
2019	Bangkok	10	(0)
2019–2022	Chonburi	5	(0)
2020	→ Trat (loan)	8	(0)
2021–2022	→ Navy (loan)	24	(0)
- * Club domestic league appearances and goals

Narutchai Nimboon (Thai: นรุตม์ชัย นิ่มบุญ; born 24 May 1995) is a Thai professional footballer who plays as a defensive midfielder.
