= Thongchai Ratchai =

Thai footballer (born 1982)

Personal information
- Full name: Thongchai Ratchai
- Date of birth: 31 October 1982 (age 43)
- Place of birth: Roi Et, Thailand
- Height: 1.71 m (5 ft 7 1/2 in)
- Position: Forward

Senior career*
| Years | Team | Apps | (Gls) |
| 2007 | Suphanburi | | |
| 2008 | TTM Customs | | |
| 2009 | Suphanburi | | |
| 2010 | Sriracha | | |
| 2011–2014 | Roi Et United | | |
| 2015–2017 | Ubon UMT United | | |
| 2017 | Rayong | | |
- * Club domestic league appearances and goals

Thongchai Ratchai (Thai: ธงไชย รัฐไชย, born October 31, 1982), nicknamed Thong (ธง), is a retired professional footballer who played as a forward from Roi Et Province, Thailand.

== Clubs ==
=== Senior ===
| Year | Club | League |
|---|---|---|
| 2007 | Suphanburi F.C. | Thai Division 1 League |
| 2008 | TTM Customs F.C. | Thailand Premier League |
| 2009 | Suphanburi F.C. | Thai Division 1 League |
| 2010 | Sriracha F.C. | |
| 2011–2014 | Roi Et United F.C. | Thai Division 1 League, Regional League Division 2 |
| 2015 | Ubon UMT United | Regional League Division 2 |

== Honors ==
=== Roi Et United ===
- Regional League Division 2: 2013
- Regional League North-East Division: 2011, 2012, 2013

=== Ubon UMT United ===
- Regional League Division 2: 2015
- Regional League North-East Division runner-up: 2015
