= Roi Et Province Stadium =

- Interactive map of Roi Et Province Stadium
- Location: Roi Et, Thailand
- Coordinates: 16°04′27″N 103°39′22″E
- Owner: Roi Et Municipality
- Operator: Roi Et Municipality
- Surface: Grass

Tenant
- Roi Et PB United F.C. 2023-present

Roi Et Province Stadium (Thai: สนามกีฬาจังหวัดร้อยเอ็ด) is a multi-purpose stadium in Roi Et Province, Thailand. It is currently used mostly for football matches and is the home stadium of Roi Et United F.C.

Roi Et Province Stadium is home of Roi Et United. It own by a Roi Et Municipality. Daily it is used by schools, sports schools and the RoiEt United football Academy. Other facilities include, swimming pool, volleyball hall, badminton hall, tennis courts, petanque facilities and weight room. There are also park type of exercise municipality facilities.
