= Roi Et PB United F.C. =

Thai football club

Roi-Et PB United ร้อยเอ็ด พีบี ยูไนเต็ด
- Full name: Roi-Et PB United (สโมสรฟุตบอลร้อยเอ็ด พีบี ยูไนเต็ด)
- Nicknames: The White Squirrels (กระรอกขาวจ้าวสนาม)
- Founded: 2020; 6 years ago
- Ground: Roi Et Province Stadium; Roi Et, Thailand
- Capacity: 3,000
- Chairman: Phakin Khamwilaisak
- Manager: Awut Efwa
- Coach: Saranuwat Nusartsang
- League: Thai League 3
- 2025–26: Thai League 3, 7th of 12 in the Northeastern region
- Website: roi-et-pb-united-fc.com
Home colours	Away colours

Roi-Et PB United Football Club (Thai: สโมสรฟุตบอลร้อยเอ็ด พีบี ยูไนเต็ด) is a Thai professional football club based in Roi Et Province in north-eastern Thailand. They are currently members of the Thai league 3 North Eastern Region and play at the Roi Et Province Stadium.

== History ==
The club was established in 2008 and joined Regional League Division 2 North Eastern Region. They finished bottom of the division in 2009, but were champions of the division two seasons later, advancing to the promotion play-offs, in which they finished fourth in a six-club group. They won their division again in 2012, but again only finished fourth in the promotion play-off group stage. After winning their regional division for a third successive season in 2013, the club won their group in the promotion play-offs, before going on to win the knock-out stages, defeating Chiangmai 2–0 on aggregate over two legs and earning promotion to Division One.

Roi Et's first season in Division One saw them finish fourth-from bottom, two points from safety, resulting in relegation straight back to Division Two. Following league reorganisation in 2017, the division was renamed League 4. The club were excluded from the league the following year after failing to obtain a licence from the Thai FA. However, they were subsequently rebranded as Roi Et CF and allowed to enter the North Eastern Region of the Thailand Amateur League for the 2018 season.

In 2020, a new chapter for football in Roi Et began with the establishment of "Roi Et PB United." This new era brought a complete change in leadership, introducing a new Club President and Team Manager.

Despite the management overhaul, the club stayed true to its heritage by retaining the iconic "White Squirrel" mascot and the traditional Purple and White team colors.

The Journey Begins

The club officially started its competitive journey from the grassroots level. Their debut performance took place in the 2022 Thailand Amateur League (TA), marking the first step in their mission to return to professional football.

== Stadium and locations ==
Coordinates	Location	Stadium	Year
16°04′27″N 103°39′22″E	Roi Et	Roi Et Province Stadium	2009–2016, 2023–present
16°03′01″N 103°43′20″E	Roi Et	Pankkee Arena	2017–2018, 2021–22

== Season-by-season record ==
Season	League									FA Cup	League Cup	T3 Cup	Top goalscorer	
Season	Division	P	W	D	L	F	A	Pts	Pos	FA Cup	League Cup	T3 Cup	Name	Goals
ROIET UNITED
2009	DIV 2 Northeast	20	2	1	17	19	62	7	11th					
2010	DIV 2 Northeast	30	15	6	9	45	41	51	5th					
2011	DIV 2 Northeast	30	23	5	2	64	20	74	1st	R2				
2012	DIV 2 Northeast	30	17	9	4	63	29	60	1st	R1	R1			
2013	DIV 2 Northeast	30	20	8	2	63	15	68	1st	R1	R1			
2014	DIV1	34	10	9	15	38	43	39	15th	Opted out	R1			
2015	DIV 2 Northeast	34	7	8	19	46	78	29	14th	Opted out	QR2			
2016	DIV 2 Northeast	26	9	8	9	25	33	35	8th	Opted out	R1			
2017	T4 Northeast	33	8	10	15	45	48	34	10th	Opted out	Opted out		(Thailand) Pakkawat Phunachiang	14
ROIET C.F.
2018	TA Northeast	2	1	1	0	6	1	4	17th	Opted out	Ineligible		(Thailand) Adisak Naowsang	3
ROIET PB UNITED - New Team
2021	TA Northeast	Not held due to COVID-19 pandemic in Thailand												
2022	TA Northeast	6	3	2	1	13	4	8	2rd	Opted out	Ineligible		(Thailand) Aphisit Thaewkrathok, (Thailand) Apirat Rungpao, (Thailand) Saichon Magmesoog	2
2023	TA Northeast	6	4	2	0	16	1	14	1st	R2	Ineligible		(Thailand) Rewat Khumbun	5
2024	TS Northeast	8	6	1	1	18	8	19	1st	R1	Ineligible		(Thailand) Thongchai Ratchai (Thailand) Wichit Singloilom	5
2024–25	T3 Northeast	20	7	3	10	25	31	24	6th	R1	R2	LP	(Brazil) Natan Oliveira	7
2025–26	T3 Northeast	22	8	8	6	28	21	32	7th	QR	QRP	LP	(Brazil) Pedro Augusto Silva Rodrigues	7
2026–27											QR2			

Champions	Runners-up	Third Place	Promoted	Relegated

- P = Played
- W = Games won
- D = Games drawn
- L = Games lost
- F = Goals for
- A = Goals against
- Pts = Points
- Pos = Final position
- QR1 = First Qualifying Round
- QR2 = Second Qualifying Round
- R1 = Round 1
- R2 = Round 2
- R3 = Round 3
- R4 = Round 4
- R5 = Round 5
- R6 = Round 6
- QF = Quarter-finals
- SF = Semi-finals
- RU = Runners-up
- W = Winners

== Players ==
As of 16 September 2026

Note: Flags indicate national team as defined under FIFA eligibility rules; some limited exceptions apply. Players may hold more than one non-FIFA nationality.

No.	Pos.	Nation	Player
1	GK	THA	Nattapumin Nongbua
2	DF	THA	Banyawat Namwong
4	MF	THA	Teerapong Deehamhae
5	DF	THA	Piyachanok Darit
7	MF	THA	Jakkapan Pornsai
8	FW	THA	Awut Efwa
9	FW	THA	Sihanart Suttisak
10	FW	THA	Phakin Khamwilaisak
11	FW	THA	Sudhkat Phomduang
13	DF	JPN	Shunya Suganuma
14	FW	THA	Arnon Prasongporn
15	MF	BRA	João Guimarães
16	DF	THA	Natthapakun Paingpala
17	DF	THA	Teeraphong Sowichai
18	DF	THA	Surawat Chaohiranphapchomphu
19	FW	THA	Thanakorn Chaisuwan

No.	Pos.	Nation	Player
21	MF	THA	Sutthiwat Chamnan
22	GK	THA	Rawee Martrin
23	FW	THA	Thittsak Saisamut
25	DF	THA	Nutdanai Ketpaen
26	FW	THA	Worawaran Pholuea
28	DF	THA	Supakorn Nutvijit
32	FW	ARG	Ramiro Pelaytay
39	DF	THA	Jirayu Niamthaisong
41	MF	THA	Thaweekun Thong-on
46	GK	THA	Peerapong Watjanapayon
49	MF	THA	Sakda Manchart
69	MF	THA	Jakkit Tentarum
77	FW	THA	Punmanat Jaimuang
87	GK	THA	Chaithawat Ausaram
88	MF	THA	Chuirwat Niraphot
99	FW	THA	Saichon Mahmesoog

== Coaching staff & Club personnel ==
Position	Name
Chairman	(Thailand) Kasetsuk Sukhongthong
Team Manager	(Thailand) Awuth Ewa
Head coach	(Thailand) Saranuwat Nusartsang
Assistant coaches	(Thailand) Nakhon Kingseeta (Thailand) Chalermkiat Pichaiwat
Goalkeeping coach	(Cameroon) Samen Ruben
Fitness coach & Sports scientist	(Thailand) Thanapon Chanmat

== Head coaches ==
List of Roiet PB United managers (2021–)

Name	Nat	Period	Honours
Pramoul Thinkatork	(Thailand)	2021 – 2 February 2025	2022 Thailand Amateur League (silver) Runner-up Lower Northeastern region 2023 Thailand Amateur League (gold) Northeastern Region; 2024 Thailand Semi-pro League (gold) Northeastern region & National Championship
Thongchai Ratchai (interim)	(Thailand)	3–11 February 2025	
Panuwat Sripao	(Thailand)	12 February 2025 - 11 March 2025	
Pramoul Thinkatork	(Thailand)	12 March 2025 - 25 October 2025	
Narongthanaphon Choeithaisongchodok	(Thailand)	28 October 2025 - 31 March 2026	
Saranuwat Nusartsang	(Thailand)	30 June 2026 -	

== Honours ==
ROIET PB UNITED

- Thailand Semi-pro League

(gold) Champions : National Championship 2024
(gold) Champions : Northeastern Region 2024

- Thailand Amateur League
  - Northeastern Region

(gold) Champions : Northeastern Region 2023
(silver) Runner-up : Lower Northeastern region 2022

ROIET UNITED

- Regional League Northeast Division

(gold) Play-off Champions : 2013
(gold) Champions : 2011, 2012, 2013
