= 2026–27 Thai FA Cup =

Chang FA Cup

Tournament details
- Country: Thailand
- Dates: 22 September 2026 – TBD
- Teams: 82

The 2026–27 Thai FA Cup is the 33rd season of Thai FA Cup, Thailand's top knockout football competition. Officially named the Chang FA Cup (Thai: ช้าง เอฟเอคัพ) due to sponsorship from Chang, the tournament is organized by the Football Association of Thailand and open to clubs across all divisions. 82 clubs entered the competition, which began with the qualification round on 22 September 2026 and will conclude with the final on TBD.

Clubs from Thai League 2, Thai League 3, the Thailand Semi-pro League, and the Thailand Amateur League compete in the qualification round, with some clubs receiving byes to the first round, which features 64 teams. Thai League 1 clubs automatically enter at this round. Matches in the qualification round proceed to penalties if tied after 90 minutes, while from the first round onward, extra time and penalties are used to determine the winner. All rounds are single-elimination, with home advantage determined by draw, except for the semifinals and final, which are held at neutral venues.

The tournament winner will earn a spot in the 2027–28 AFC Champions League Elite League stage and the 2027 Thailand Champions Cup. The champion will also receive a prize of 5,000,000 baht, while the runner-up will be awarded 1,000,000 baht. As one of the most prestigious competitions in Thai football, the FA Cup offers clubs from all tiers a chance to compete for national honors.

== Schedule ==
Round	Date	Matches	Clubs	New entries this round
Qualification round	22–23 September 2026	18	9 + 15 + 6 + 6 → 18	9 2026–27 Thai League 2; 15 2026–27 Thai League 3; 6 Thailand Semi-pro League; 6 Thailand Amateur League
First round	20–22 October 2026	32	18 + 16 + 3 + 17 + 8 + 2 → 32	16 2026–27 Thai League 1; 3 2026–27 Thai League 2; 17 2026–27 Thai League 3; 8 Thailand Semi-pro League; 2 Thailand Amateur League
Second round	15–17 December 2026 and 3 February 2027	16	32 → 16	
Third round	TBD	8	16 → 8	
Quarter-finals	TBD	4	8 → 4	
Semi-finals	TBD	2	4 → 2	
Final	TBD	1	2 → Champions	
Total				82 clubs

== Results ==
Note: T1: Clubs from Thai League 1; T2: Clubs from Thai League 2; T3: Clubs from Thai League 3; TS: Clubs from Thailand Semi-pro League; TA: Clubs from Thailand Amateur League.

=== Qualification round ===
The qualification round of the 2026–27 Thai FA Cup featured 36 clubs, comprising 9 clubs from 2026–27 Thai League 2, 15 clubs from 2026–27 Thai League 3, 6 clubs from Thailand Semi-pro League, and 6 clubs from the Thailand Amateur League. The draw for this round took place on 25 August 2026. 82 goals were scored in this round.

22 September 2026	Phayathai (TA)	0–1	PTS (TA)	Mueang, Pathum Thani
15:30 (UTC+7)		Report	Akaraded Hongto 36'	Stadium: Bang Kadi Municipal Stadium; Referee: Nattaphak Sawasdee; Assistant referees: Thanankrid Noichanwong, Wilawan Rattanakhot; Fourth official: Watchara Wongkhan

22 September 2026	Futera United (T3)	1–4	BFB Pattaya City (T3)	Khlong Luang, Pathum Thani
15:30 (UTC+7)	James Oise Jesuikhode 64'	Report	Marcelo de Sousa Silva 19'; Adewumi Nicoholas Aladetimi Jr. 66', 88'; Abdul Kharim Ayeh 90+14' (pen.)	Stadium: Stadium of Valaya Alongkorn Rajabhat University under the Royal Patronage; Referee: Chaiwat Rupsa-at; Assistant referees: Sujin Rodart, Surachai Kumkeaw; Fourth official: Palakorn Parasatit

22 September 2026	Nongkhai (TA)	1–2	Nongbua Pitchaya (T2)	Mueang, Nong Khai
15:30 (UTC+7)	Bancha Phromkhot 84' (pen.)	Report	Thanayut Jittabud 25', 63'	Stadium: Nong Khai Provincial Stadium; Attendance: 245; Referee: Anan Keawmuangkhun; Assistant referees: Rachan Dawangpa, Nattapong Wadweangcom; Fourth official: Natthaphong Saengsuwannarat

22 September 2026	Sing Ubon (TA)	0–11	Suphanburi (T3)	Lak Si, Bangkok
15:30 (UTC+7)		Report	Nanthiphat Samingnakorn 9'; Pathomphon Phutson 14', 36'; Samuel Silva Santos 21'; Athiphat Petcharat 35', 54', 69'; Keder Junior Marques da Cunha 40'; Sinthon Sukkabin 62'; Apichat Sarai 70', 83'	Stadium: Boonyachinda Stadium; Attendance: 120; Referee: Niruch Panjontuk; Assistant referees: Thakun Meekaew, Surasak Khamphan; Fourth official: Pheerapat Yodnak

22 September 2026	Lopburi (TA)	3–0	APD United (TA)	Mueang, Lopburi
17:00 (UTC+7)	Chakrit Rawanprakone 15', 42'; Siwakron Plodprong 90+3'	Report		Stadium: Jaifah Academy Stadium; Attendance: 352; Referee: Winai Riangwong; Assistant referees: Sorawit Kularat, Tanakorn Leechaisathaporn; Fourth official: Chakrit Siripong

22 September 2026	Roi Et Alan (TS)	1–5	Songkhla (T2)	Mueang, Roi Et
18:00 (UTC+7)	Phumiphat Sonphong 41'	Report	Nobparut Raksachum 70', 90+6'; Basree Sanron 71', 82'; Sarawut Thongkot 87'	Stadium: Roi Et Provincial Stadium; Attendance: 355; Referee: Chairat Phooalai; Assistant referees: Kittichot Worasan, Anuwat Daennarat; Fourth official: Teeramate Pooprang

22 September 2026	Huasamrong Gateway (TS)	2–2 (5–4 p)	Prime Bangkok (T3)	Mueang, Chachoengsao
18:00 (UTC+7)	Jakkit Niyomsuk 44'; Athiwat Poolsawat 90+1' (pen.)	Report	Wachirawit Tupmuang 28'; Thanawat Dechkla 67'	Stadium: Chachoengsao Municipal Stadium; Attendance: 200; Referee: Theerapon Nakthong; Assistant referees: Attapol Soheng, Jakkarin Pirunkan; Fourth official: Monruedee Junmai
	Penalties
	Athiwat Poolsawat (penalty scored); Khamron Phanchaem (penalty scored); Woraphol Phona (penalty scored); Phattharanan Nonthawichit (penalty scored); Jakkit Niyomsuk (penalty scored)		(penalty scored) Sirisak Promduang; (penalty scored) Noppakhun Yingbamrung; (penalty scored) Thanawat Dechkla; (penalty scored) Wongsakorn Buasamlee; (penalty missed) Konrawich Muengprasert

22 September 2026	Kanchanaburi Power (T2)	2–2 (5–6 p)	Phetchabun (TS)	Mueang, Kanchanaburi
18:00 (UTC+7)	Róbson Duarte 8'; Jean Hebert de Freitas 37'	Report	Watcharapong Subin 76'; Apiwat Dangpuk 86'	Stadium: Kanchanaburi Provincial Stadium; Attendance: 1,918; Referee: U-sen Yala; Assistant referees: Binla Preeda, Narong Chaitong; Fourth official: Thanaphon Chaowanon
	Penalties
	Patrick Marcelino (penalty scored); Payanat Thodsanid (penalty scored); Nantawat Suankaew (penalty scored); Chayapipat Supunpasuch (penalty scored); Wattana Klomjit (penalty scored); Nethithorn Kaewcharoen (penalty missed)		(penalty scored) Thammarat Sukumam; (penalty scored) Pornchai Teakprakhon; (penalty scored) Jettaphat Jaiphakdee; (penalty scored) Jakkapong Polmart; (penalty scored) Nopparat Sakun-ood; (penalty scored) Apiwat Dangpuk

22 September 2026	Muangthong United (T2)	8–0	Phrae (TS)	Pak Kret, Nonthaburi
18:00 (UTC+7)	Jessadakorn Noysri 12'; Nontawat Onsuebsai 22', 43'; Thitiphan Khanoeinham 31', 39'; Pakorn Prempak 57'; Sekthaphong Phimchan 73'; Chatnipat Janpong 87'	Report		Stadium: Thunderdome Stadium; Attendance: 691; Referee: Ekkachai Phetcham; Assistant referees: Anucha Pinamon, Bukhori Lehnuh; Fourth official: Chamnan Chomngam

23 September 2026	Nakhon Sawan See Khwae City (TS)	4–2	Kamphaengphet (T3)	Mueang, Nakhon Sawan
15:30 (UTC+7)	Wuttipat Srimuang 45+1'; Supanat Srisapatrikanon 48'; Saran Thong-kamsri 57'; Phatharapol Thongsuk 90+1'	Report	Ebuka Chuwadebalu 87'; Yuta Yamaguchi 90'	Stadium: Nakhon Sawan Provincial Stadium; Attendance: 180; Referee: Chalit Ploypech; Assistant referees: Kosit Laochaem, Channarong Tomklan; Fourth official: Ekkachai Juywong

23 September 2026	Samui United (T3)	1–1 (5–4 p)	Chainat Hornbill (T2)	Ko Samui, Surat Thani
15:30 (UTC+7)	Vincent Boesen 45'	Report	Mubarak Mohammed Ahmed 90+5'	Stadium: Ko Samui City Municipality International Stadium; Attendance: 280; Referee: Yod Damhai; Assistant referees: Panuwat Chumming, Amen Maprased; Fourth official: Faosan Wangsoh
	Penalties
	Tommy O'Sullivan (penalty scored); Chanatip Krainara (penalty scored); Pakawat Taengoakson (penalty scored); Warawut Motim (penalty scored); Taninnat Athisaraworameth (penalty scored)		(penalty scored) Mubarak Mohammed Ahmed; (penalty scored) Tanin Kiatlerttham; (penalty missed) Piyaruck Kwangkaew; (penalty scored) Jompon Homboonma; (penalty scored) Jompon Homboonma

23 September 2026	Bangsaen Saensuk (TS)	1–8	Phichit United (T3)	Si Racha, Chonburi
15:30 (UTC+7)	Auchukon Sbayyen 5'	Report	Pratchaya Nuntanapiboon 45', 49', 73'; Partchya Katethip 55'; Boubacar Koné 76'; Anuyut Mudlem 79'; Michael Arinze Anunobi 81' (pen.); Ekkapoom Potharungroj 90+1'	Stadium: Stadium of Rajamangala University of Technology Tawan-ok; Attendance: 250; Referee: Pongthep Raipimai; Assistant referees: Premsak Rungrueang, Phutthaphong Khongkraphan; Fourth official: Bussarin Sukkakit

23 September 2026	Yala (T3)	1–1 (5–4 p)	Ayutthaya PK (T3)	Mueang, Yala
15:30 (UTC+7)	Taylon Correa 37'	Report	Nattapong Karuna 66'	Stadium: Stadium of Thailand National Sports University, Yala Campus; Attendance: 325; Referee: Farid Baenak; Assistant referees: Sakda Madmanang, Tanakorn Tala; Fourth official: Iffan Phanwang
	Penalties
	Adel Gafaiti (penalty scored); Cauã Costa Macedo Vieira da Silva (penalty missed); Nattapol Hothong (penalty scored); Taylon Correa (penalty missed); Muhammadfarut Muelohhamae (penalty scored); Ahmadfatin Posae (penalty scored); Chakhrit Liwang (penalty scored)		(penalty scored) Manop Kittiphirun; (penalty scored) Phurewat Aunthong; (penalty missed) Nuttapol Srisamutr; (penalty missed) Anucha Phantong; (penalty scored) Bukkoree Lemdee; (penalty scored) Phatchanon Ditson; (penalty missed) Wuttipong Phlaikaew

23 September 2026	Chachoengsao Hi-Tek (T3)	0–4	Bangkok (T3)	Mueang, Chachoengsao
18:00 (UTC+7)		Report	Chitpanya Tisud 5'; Padungsak Phothinak 51'; Nonthaphut Panaimthon 87'; Thatsadaporn Phuengkuson 89'	Stadium: Chachoengsao Municipal Stadium; Attendance: 321; Referee: Watcharasak Intharak; Assistant referees: Kanathip Waithaisong, Jinnawat Janphanjang; Fourth official: Ekkalak Muangkhotr

23 September 2026	Khon Kaen United (T2)	3–0	Navy (T3)	Mueang, Khon Kaen
18:00 (UTC+7)	Rosalvo 46'; Kwon Dae-hee 78' (pen.); Phalitchok Chitsompong 90+5'	Report		Stadium: Khon Kaen PAO Stadium; Attendance: 2,117; Referee: Jarin Yawapee; Assistant referees: Nuttapong Khunlert, Limonfine Poxpong; Fourth official: Prakasit Chantarasawang

23 September 2026	Nakhon Si United (T3)	0–2	Kasetsart (T2)	Mueang, Nakhon Si Thammarat
18:00 (UTC+7)		Report	Adisak Sosungnoen 52'; AJ Inia 90'	Stadium: Nakhon Si Thammarat Provincial Stadium; Attendance: 324; Referee: Ameen Lorma; Assistant referees: Mongkhon Kaisin, Hanyot Buangrab; Fourth official: Wacharawit Suwanraksa

23 September 2026	Chanthaburi (T2)	8–0	Chiangmai (T3)	Mueang, Chanthaburi
18:00 (UTC+7)	Thanin Plodkeaw 18', 45'; Chinnawat Prachuapmon 26', 62', 80'; Narakorn Noomchansakul 29'; Suwit Paipromrat 38', 63'	Report		Stadium: Chanthaburi Provincial Stadium; Attendance: 513; Referee: Suthipong Teekhasuk; Assistant referees: Adisai Pongnairat, Piyanun Wattanawatchsuk; Fourth official: Satchukorn Saenchu

23 September 2026	Nara (T3)	1–0	Chiangmai United (T2)	Mueang, Narathiwat
19:00 (UTC+7)	Elson Hooi 63'	Report		Stadium: Narathiwat PAO Stadium; Referee: Sapuding Kalong; Assistant referees: Anwa Samaae, Sanusee Daewosanung; Fourth official: Aibroheem Sama

=== First round ===
The first round consists of 64 clubs: 18 winners from the qualification round and 46 clubs that automatically advanced. Among the qualification round winners are 6 clubs from T2, 7 from T3, 3 from TS, and 2 from TA. Joining them are 16 clubs from the 2026–27 Thai League 1, who were granted automatic entry as the top-tier league representatives. Additionally, clubs from other leagues received byes directly to the first round, including 3 clubs from the 2026–27 Thai League 2, 17 clubs from the 2026–27 Thai League 3, 8 clubs from the Thailand Semi-pro League, and 2 clubs from the Thailand Amateur League. The draw for this round took place on 6 October 2026. 117 goals were scored in this round.

20 October 2026	Romklao United (TS)	1–0	Sukhothai (T1)	Min Buri, Bangkok
15:00 (UTC+7)	Suphawit Junngam 42'	Report		Stadium: Stadium of Kasem Bundit University; Attendance: 298; Referee: Kotchapoom Meesridaecha; Assistant referees: Chotrawee Tongduang, Sahatnet Deemongkol; Fourth official: Direk Kaort

20 October 2026	Nakhon Phanom United (TS)	1–0	Marines (T3)	Mueang, Nakhon Phanom
15:00 (UTC+7)	Teeraphat Chasing 6'	Report		Stadium: Stadium of Nakhon Phanom University; Attendance: 248; Referee: Chairat Phooalai; Assistant referees: Kittichot Worasan, Peerapol Janthawan; Fourth official: Thammanoon Sasen

20 October 2026	Nakhon Sawan See Khwae City (TS)	1–2 (a.e.t.)	Udon Banjan United (T3)	Mueang, Nakhon Sawan
15:00 (UTC+7)	Kundanai Thongoon 2'	Report	Suphakrit Dongchan 25'; Chotiphat Sicumsaeng 117'	Stadium: Nakhon Sawan Provincial Stadium; Referee: Chirawat Chomphoosee; Assistant referees: Michai Changhirai, Bandit Chuchan; Fourth official: Jonrak Sangcharern

20 October 2026	Udon United (T3)	5–0	Lopburi Poma (T3)	Mueang, Udon Thani
15:00 (UTC+7)	Amporn Chaipong 45+2'; Cristian Alex 50'; Jhakkarin Sitthichan 88'; Narongkorn Panjarak 89'; Pannathon Mungmai 90+4'	Report		Stadium: Stadium of Thailand National Sports University, Udon Thani Campus; Attendance: 364; Referee: Rutratchapoom Moolpong; Assistant referees: Bongkarn Sudtae, Nakarin Thongkerd; Fourth official: Apisit Yotayut

20 October 2026	Suphanburi (T3)	0–4	Lamphun Warriors (T1)	Mueang, Suphanburi
18:00 (UTC+7)		Report	Baworn Tapla 53'; Tawan Khotrsupho 74'; Athit Berg 85', 90'	Stadium: Suphanburi Provincial Stadium; Attendance: 841; Referee: Komgrit Ponpasit; Assistant referees: Vichet Getkaew, Srisuwan Boonnum; Fourth official: Worapon Sanjan

20 October 2026	Huasamrong Gateway (TS)	1–2 (a.e.t.)	FC Mahasarakham (TA)	Mueang, Chachoengsao
18:00 (UTC+7)	Narakorn Srilaphat 45'	Report	Witthaya Wokhwa 43', 119'	Stadium: Chachoengsao Municipal Stadium; Attendance: 240; Referee: Parinya Kotid; Assistant referees: Wararit Suwanjira, Anocha Praphatson; Fourth official: Ekkalak Muangkhotr

20 October 2026	Uthai Thani (T1)	2–0	Nakhon Pathom United (T2)	Mueang, Uthai Thani
18:00 (UTC+7)	Willian Lira 41'; William Weidersjö 56'	Report		Stadium: Uthai Thani Provincial Stadium; Attendance: 1,242; Referee: Woottipong Ketkam; Assistant referees: Worapong Prasartsri, Nissan Janthep; Fourth official: Chaireag Ngam-som

20 October 2026	Chonburi (T1)	2–5	BFB Pattaya City (T3)	Mueang, Chonburi
18:00 (UTC+7)	Channarong Promsrikaew 11'; Sittichok Paso 33'	Report	Chitipat Kaeoyos 22'; Marcelo de Sousa Silva 27'; Adewumi Nicoholas Aladetimi Jr 45+1'; Abdul Kharim Ayeh 55', 60'	Stadium: Chonburi Daikin Stadium; Attendance: 1,060; Referee: Satchukorn Saenchu; Assistant referees: Natthaphon Mala, Anucha Pinamon; Fourth official: Narinnart Tiamskun

21 October 2026	Dome (TA)	0–7	Sisaket United (T1)	Khlong Luang, Pathum Thani
15:00 (UTC+7)		Report	Deyvison Fernandes de Oliveira Silvério 5', 59'; Saranyawat Naprasert 29' (o.g.); Sittichok Kannoo 47', 49', 74'; Pongsakron Hanrattana 90'	Stadium: Stadium of Valaya Alongkorn Rajabhat University under the Royal Patronage; Attendance: 500; Referee: Kittichai Huthip; Assistant referees: Phubes Lekpha, Sumate Peasiri; Fourth official: Anon Lohlor

21 October 2026	Chumphon United (T3)	3–6	Songkhla (T2)	Mueang, Chumphon
15:00 (UTC+7)	Rachata Intharason 28'; Kim Jung-hyun 79'; Cinnawat Sangmala 89'	Report	Phuchakhen Chandaeng 17', 39'; Amarildo de Andrade Pedro Junior 35', 65', 90'; Rungrod Mudlah 71'	Stadium: Stadium of Thailand National Sports University, Chumphon Campus; Attendance: 135; Referee: Metawin Chujit; Assistant referees: Pornchai Kongdamni, Phitsanu Chusi; Fourth official: Pissanusak Sriyai

21 October 2026	Kasem Bundit University (T3)	2–1	Customs United (T3)	Min Buri, Bangkok
15:00 (UTC+7)	Pakkapol Maimard 22'; Sontaya Thotam 44'	Report	Siwa Sangsuk 80'	Stadium: Stadium of Kasem Bundit University; Attendance: 210; Referee: Haripunchai Tibkhan; Assistant referees: Fa-is Sohdalae, Phichayut Noitathong; Fourth official: Winai Riangwong

21 October 2026	Kasetsart (T2)	1–3	Chanthaburi (T2)	Chatuchak, Bangkok
17:00 (UTC+7)	Worachai Jaoprakam 43'	Report	Apichok Seerawong 9'; Chinnawat Prachuapmon 24', 35'	Stadium: Insee Chantarasatit Stadium; Attendance: 266; Referee: Putthipong Issising; Assistant referees: Apichat Prasasak, Bukhori Lehnuh; Fourth official: Wirot Oupachit

21 October 2026	Burapha United (T3)	1–1 (a.e.t.) (4–5 p)	Chiangrai United (T1)	Ban Bueng, Chonburi
17:00 (UTC+7)	Adisak Kraisorn 16'	Report	Robson Santos do Carmo Júnior 77'	Stadium: Banbueng Municipal Stadium; Attendance: 847; Referee: Kriangkrai Thiphanunjarukorn; Assistant referees: Rawut Nakarit, Wirot Lokham; Fourth official: Pichet Chumcha
	Penalties
	Adisak Kraisorn (penalty missed); Chinonso Kingsley Thomas (penalty scored); Teerawut Churok (penalty scored); Kritsana Kasemkulvilai (penalty scored); Naphat Chumpanya (penalty scored); Brendo Marins de Souza (penalty missed)		(penalty scored) Victor Cardozo; (penalty scored) Robson Santos do Carmo Júnior; (penalty scored) Tanasak Srisai; (penalty scored) Montree Promsawat; (penalty missed) Douglas de Souza Nascimento; (penalty scored) Sansern Limwattana

21 October 2026	Buriram United (T1)	8–0	DPU (TS)	Mueang, Buriram
18:00 (UTC+7)	Thanakrit Chotmuangpak 12', 34'; Stefan Schimmer 35', 82'; Narubadin Weerawatnodom 65'; Nathakorn Rattanasuwan 74'; Shinnaphat Leeaoh 78'; Phanuphong Jeyakom 83'	Report; Highlight		Stadium: Chang Arena; Attendance: 8,559; Referee: Manuschai Chawong; Assistant referees: Rachan Dawangpa, Nattapong Wadweangcom; Fourth official: Methas Kumarasit

21 October 2026	Thap Luang United (T3)	1–2	Rayong (T1)	Mueang, Nakhon Pathom
18:00 (UTC+7)	Suksan Kaewpanya 67'	Report	João Vitor Coutinho Maia 58'; Thanawat Pimyotha 90+3'	Stadium: Thap Luang United Janded Stadium; Attendance: 582; Referee: Veeraporn Maophaeo; Assistant referees: Pattarapong Kijsathit, Kiadtisak Janmol; Fourth official: Rangsan Kangchainguan

21 October 2026	Rasisalai United (T1)	1–3	Port (T1)	Mueang, Sisaket
18:00 (UTC+7)	Kim Ji-min 16'	Report; Highlight	Erik Sviatchenko 2'; Jude Soonsup-Bell 11', 27'	Stadium: Sri Nakhon Lamduan Stadium; Attendance: 819; Referee: Chaikrit Inboonsong; Assistant referees: Binla Preeda, Narin Wongprapipak; Fourth official: Anan Keawmuangkhun

21 October 2026	Khon Kaen United (T2)	1–0	BG Pathum United (T1)	Mueang, Khon Kaen
18:00 (UTC+7)	Allan Norbert Jean-Claude Carneva 15'	Report; Highlight		Stadium: Khon Kaen PAO Stadium; Attendance: 4,267; Referee: Peerasan Krataithong; Assistant referees: Kasama Loyma, Samart Kaikaew; Fourth official: Sittisak Kaewkam

21 October 2026	Warin Chamrap (TS)	2–1	Karin United (TS)	Mueang, Ubon Ratchathani
18:00 (UTC+7)	Theeraphat Khruethong 12'; Wiwitchai U-kham 90+9'	Report	Siranat Sriwanat 65'	Stadium: Stadium of Ubon Ratchathani Rajabhat University; Attendance: 380; Referee: Chinnawat Kottai; Assistant referees: Teerasauk Pengpidet, Chindanai Cha-umphan; Fourth official: Anon Borisut

21 October 2026	Phitsanulok (T3)	3–1 (a.e.t.)	Fleet (T3)	Mueang, Phitsanulok
18:00 (UTC+7)	Felipe Augusto de Oliveira 90+2' (pen.); Worapart Chaenram 98'; Gil 108'	Report	Thanawat Sodalee 38'	Stadium: Phitsanulok PAO Stadium; Attendance: 483; Referee: Suchart Kuisue; Assistant referees: Natthawut Tasmak, Kritsawaphong Khamta; Fourth official: Anurak Sankaew

21 October 2026	Ayutthaya United (T1)	2–1	Muangthong United (T2)	Phra Nakhon Si Ayutthaya, Phra Nakhon Si Ayutthaya
18:30 (UTC+7)	Caíque 54' (pen.), 69'	Report	Rivaldo Vítor Borba Ferreira Júnior 90'	Stadium: Phra Nakhon Si Ayutthaya Provincial Stadium; Attendance: 2,580; Referee: Pawara Seejen; Assistant referees: Tanate Chuchuen, Watthana Chonchanakul; Fourth official: Alongkorn Khonwai

21 October 2026	Police Tero (T2)	4–1	Surin City (T3)	Lak Si, Bangkok
18:30 (UTC+7)	Siam Yapp 42'; Valdo 54'; Nakarin Woochueku 83', 86'	Report	Thiraphon Praosaen 79'	Stadium: NT Stadium; Attendance: 895; Referee: Suthipong Teekhasuk; Assistant referees: Anupong Sangtopo, Narong Chaitong; Fourth official: Weeraphong Chaiyasuk

21 October 2026	Bangkok (T3)	0–2	Nongbua Pitchaya (T2)	Thung Khru, Bangkok
18:30 (UTC+7)		Report	Chawin Srichan 63'; Lucas de Lima Máximo 86'	Stadium: 72nd Anniversary Stadium, Bang Mot; Attendance: 873; Referee: Narit Mungtoemklang; Assistant referees: Nattphon Chuensamran, Pathompong Anunluksanakul; Fourth official: Palathip Homwarn

21 October 2026	Yala (T3)	1–0	Samut Sakhon City (T3)	Mueang, Yala
19:00 (UTC+7)	Cauã Costa Macedo Vieira da Silva 73'	Report		Stadium: Stadium of Yala Rajabhat University; Attendance: 376; Referee: Farid Baenak; Assistant referees: Ameen Puteh, Mayunai Kueteh; Fourth official: Iffan Phanwang

21 October 2026	Bangkok United (T1)	8–0	Old Blood (TS)	Thanyaburi, Pathum Thani
19:00 (UTC+7)	Marc Cardona 18', 31'; Felipe Santos 20', 87'; Narakhorn Kangkratok 28'; Thitipoom Plianyuak 45+1' (o.g.); Kritsada Nontharat 80'; Phurich Subhensawang 90+3'	Report		Stadium: True BG Stadium; Attendance: 337; Referee: Kanoksak Khiaodaeng; Assistant referees: Chaiya Sripak, Thanet Jairaw; Fourth official: Jarin Yawapee

21 October 2026	Pattaya United (T2)	2–0	Nara (T3)	Bang Lamung, Chonburi
19:00 (UTC+7)	Jirapong Pungviravong 62'; Karn Jorates 67'	Report		Stadium: Nong Prue Stadium; Attendance: 683; Referee: U-sen Yala; Assistant referees: Siwat Chaithong, Jagkrit Kaenkaew; Fourth official: Amnat Rattanapakdee

21 October 2026	Ratchaburi (T1)	4–2	Pattani (T1)	Mueang, Ratchaburi
19:00 (UTC+7)	Maicon Douglas Teixeira Goulart Alves 8' (o.g.); Phongsakon Sangkasopha 42', 61'; Sanchai Nontasila 53'	Report; Highlight	Imron Hayiyusoh 81'; Clayton 90+3'	Stadium: Ratchaburi Stadium; Attendance: 2,620; Referee: Chaiya Moolmanee; Assistant referees: Chaowalit Poonprasit, Poonsawat Samransuk; Fourth official: Piyawat Rittimunee

22 October 2026	Surindra (TS)	1–3	Phichit United (T3)	Mueang, Surin
15:00 (UTC+7)	Wasinrapee Sukratanaangkoon 45+3' (pen.)	Report	Boubacar Koné 18'; Michael Arinze Anunobi 24', 90+5'	Stadium: Stadium of Rajamangala University of Technology Isan, Surin Campus; Attendance: 102; Referee: Patiyut Monthianart; Assistant referees: Ittipon Homdee, Yuranan Nukhao; Fourth official: Uthai Purase

22 October 2026	Bangkapi (T3)	3–1	PTS (TA)	Pathum Wan, Bangkok
15:00 (UTC+7)	Kornpong Thanyachartmongkol 21'; Sirapat Serprayoon 23'; Cho Yun-kwon 57'	Report	Krittanai Numprathum 67'	Stadium: Thephasadin Stadium; Attendance: 400; Referee: Phadoongkiat Piangdee; Assistant referees: Chakrit Siripong, Wilawan Rattanakhot; Fourth official: Niruch Panjontuk

22 October 2026	VRN Muangnont (T3)	0–0 (a.e.t.) (5–6 p)	Samui United (T3)	Bang Yai, Nonthaburi
15:00 (UTC+7)		Report		Stadium: Nonthaburi Stadium; Attendance: 150; Referee: Chanapat Kitpaiboontawee; Assistant referees: Arna Rattanabumchum, Noppadol Kamnotsri; Fourth official: Suwijak Keama-suttinan
	Penalties
	Kwame Karikari (penalty scored); Panupong Suttiprasert (penalty scored); Asree Uma (penalty scored); Tawat Boonsoi (penalty scored); Phureerat Yothipukka (penalty scored); Akkhadet Suksiri (penalty missed)		(penalty scored) Warawut Motim; (penalty scored) Vincent Boesen; (penalty scored) Emmanuel Sonupe; (penalty scored) Taninnat Athisaraworameth; (penalty scored) Pornprom Furzer; (penalty scored) Taweechai Kliangklao

22 October 2026	Phetchabun (TS)	3–1	Banbueng (T3)	Mueang, Phetchabun
17:00 (UTC+7)	Manaschai Faktae 5'; Kritsana Khanwong 53', 82'	Report	Nawaphonn Sonkham 34' (pen.)	Stadium: Phetchabun Provincial Stadium; Attendance: 1,200; Referee: Chalit Ploypech; Assistant referees: Warayut Jantakhun, Suphatcha Maprang; Fourth official: Nattawut Pornchaiwirun

22 October 2026	Phetchaburi PBRU (T3)	1–0	Lopburi (TA)	Mueang, Phetchaburi
17:00 (UTC+7)	Jharughat Songkuram 14' (pen.)	Report		Stadium: Stadium of Phetchaburi Rajabhat University; Attendance: 215; Referee: Sathit Bootngam; Assistant referees: Narakorn Sapsuksai, Suchanon Jaitrong; Fourth official: Nirut Kesaporn

22 October 2026	PT Prachuap (T1)	3–0	Nonthaburi United (TS)	Mueang, Prachuap Khiri Khan
18:00 (UTC+7)	Chitsanuphong Phimpsang 10', 13'; Jehhanafee Mamah 29'	Report		Stadium: Sam Ao Stadium; Attendance: 400; Referee: Sila Jinnigorn; Assistant referees: Rachain Srichai, Yossapon Tongprom; Fourth official: Thapakorn Thongkon

=== Second round ===
The second round consists of 32 clubs, all securing victories in the first round. This stage features 11 clubs from the T1, 6 clubs from the T2, 10 clubs from the T3, 4 clubs from the TS, and 1 club from the TA. The draw for this round took place on 29 October 2026. TBD goals were scored in this round.

== Tournament statistics ==
=== Hat-tricks ===
Player	For	Against	Result	Date	Round
(Thailand) Athiphat Petcharat	Suphanburi (T3)	Sing Ubon (TA)	11–0 (A)	22 September 2026	Qualification round
(Thailand) Pratchaya Nuntanapiboon	Phichit United (T3)	Bangsaen Saensuk (TS)	8–1 (A)	23 September 2026	Qualification round
(Thailand) Chinnawat Prachuapmon	Chanthaburi (T2)	Chiangmai (T3)	8–0 (H)	23 September 2026	Qualification round
(Thailand) Sittichok Kannoo	Sisaket United (T1)	Dome (TA)	7–0 (A)	21 October 2026	First round
(Brazil) Amarildo de Andrade Pedro Junior	Songkhla (T2)	Chumphon United (T3)	6–3 (A)	21 October 2026	First round

Notes: (H) = Home team; (A) = Away team

== See also ==
- 2026–27 Thai League 1
- 2026–27 Thai League 2
- 2026–27 Thai League 3
- 2026–27 Thai League 3 Northern Region
- 2026–27 Thai League 3 Central Region
- 2026–27 Thai League 3 Northeastern Region
- 2026–27 Thai League 3 Eastern Region
- 2026–27 Thai League 3 Western Region
- 2026–27 Thai League 3 Southern Region
- 2026–27 Thai League 3 National Championship
- 2027 Thailand Semi-pro League
- 2026–27 Thai League Cup
- 2026–27 Thai U21 League
