= 2026–27 Thai League Cup =

Muang Thai Cup

Tournament details
- Country: Thailand
- Dates: 5 September 2026 – TBD
- Teams: 78

The 2026–27 Thai League Cup marked the 17th season of Thailand's knockout football competition in its second era. This edition of the League Cup signaled the tournament's return to Thai football after a 10-year hiatus. Sponsored by Muang Thai Life Assurance and Muang Thai Insurance, it was officially known as the Muang Thai Cup (Thai: เมืองไทย คัพ). 78 clubs were accepted into the competition, which commenced with the first qualification round on 5 September 2026 and concluded with the final on TBD. Notably, the tournament was open exclusively to clubs from Thai League 1, Thai League 2, and Thai League 3.

The competition structure was as follows: Clubs from Thai League 3 began their journey in the qualifying rounds, which are organized regionally. As the tournament progressed, clubs from Thai League 2 entered during the play-off round. The first round then saw the entry of clubs from Thai League 1, who awaited the winners of the previous rounds.

The competition offered the champions a prize of 5 million baht, while the runners-up earned 1 million baht. In addition to domestic silverware, the winner of the final earned qualification for the 2027–28 ASEAN Club Championship. The tournament's reintroduction marked its return to the Thai football calendar as a regional competition involving clubs from across the country.

== Calendar ==
Round	Date	Matches	Clubs	New entries this round
First qualification round	5–6 September 2026	12	24 → 12	24 2026–27 Thai League 3
Second qualification round	12–13 September 2026 and 7 October 2026	18	12 + 24 → 18	24 2026–27 Thai League 3
Qualification play-off round	3–5 November 2026	16	18 + 14 → 16	14 2026–27 Thai League 2
First round	8–30 December 2026 and 6–7 January 2027	16	16 + 16 → 16	16 2026–27 Thai League 1
Second round	TBD	8	16 → 8	
Quarter-finals	TBD	4	8 → 4	
Semi-finals	TBD	2	4 → 2	
Final	TBD	1	2 → Champions	
Total				78 clubs

== Results ==
Note: T1: Clubs from Thai League 1; T2: Clubs from Thai League 2; T3: Clubs from Thai League 3.

=== First qualification round ===
24 clubs from the 2026–27 Thai League 3 participated in the first qualification round of the 2026–27 Thai League Cup. The draw for this round took place on 20 August 2026. 36 goals were scored in this round.

Northern region
The first qualification round of the 2026–27 Thai League Cup in the Northern Region featured 6 clubs from the 2026–27 Thai League 3 Northern Region.

6 September 2026	Khelang United (T3)	0–1	Kamphaengphet (T3)	Mueang, Lampang
15:30 (UTC+7)		Report	Yuta Yamaguchi 42'	Stadium: Stadium of Thailand National Sports University, Lampang Campus; Attendance: 220; Referee: Suphanat Yainta; Assistant referees: Pramote Boon-in, Songrit Trakulchai; Fourth official: Thirawat Saekue

6 September 2026	Northern Nakhon Mae Sot United (T3)	1–1 (6–5 p)	Phitsanulok (T3)	Mae Sot, Tak
15:30 (UTC+7)	Boonkerd Chaiyasin 19'	Report	Ratthathammanun Deeying 1'	Stadium: Five Border Districts Stadium; Attendance: 87; Referee: Chirawat Chomphoosee; Assistant referees: Michai Changhirai, Supachai Chaitrakunthanasan; Fourth official: Jonrak Sangcharern
	Penalties
	Burnel Okana-Stazi (penalty missed); Apisit Bunsrikul (penalty missed); Thanat Tangnontanakorn (penalty scored); Adisorn Noonart (penalty scored); Boonkerd Chaiyasin (penalty scored); Diarra Junior Aboubacar (penalty missed); Natthaphon Puangtaptim (penalty scored); Tewidikum Tah Nivan (penalty scored); Siriphop Jhongoonklang (penalty scored)		(penalty scored) Cesinha; (penalty missed) Polwat Pinkong; (penalty scored) Sattra Ratlongmueang; (penalty missed) Premsak Chantum; (penalty scored) Felipe Augusto de Oliveira; (penalty missed) Panuwit Silapong; (penalty scored) Kittitach Pranithi; (penalty scored) Parinya Nusong; (penalty missed) Kritchai Sangrung

6 September 2026	Chiangmai (T3)	3–1	Chattrakan City (T3)	Mueang, Chiang Mai
18:00 (UTC+7)	Mathawin Chueanun 20'; Veerapat Mekhumrai 45+1'; Kueanun Junumpai 88'	Report	Debiro Dzarma Bata 90+1'	Stadium: Chiang Mai Municipal Stadium; Attendance: 793; Referee: Chalit Ploypech; Assistant referees: Jarin Champakpriew, Teerapong Oma; Fourth official: Tanavit Prompet

Northeastern region
The first qualification round of the 2026–27 Thai League Cup in the Northeastern Region featured 4 clubs from the 2026–27 Thai League 3 Northeastern Region.

6 September 2026	Roi Et PB United (T3)	3–1	Khon Kaen Mordindang (T3)	Mueang, Roi Et
18:00 (UTC+7)	Sihanart Suttisak 24'; Jakkapan Pornsai 45+1'; Phatcharaphon Lalun 90' (o.g.)	Report	Tanapol Srithong 34'	Stadium: Roi Et Provincial Stadium; Attendance: 819; Referee: Prakasit Chantarasawang; Assistant referees: Nuttapong Khunlert, Sarawut Thitsawang; Fourth official: Teeramate Pooprang

6 September 2026	Khon Kaen (T3)	2–1	Udon United (T3)	Mueang, Khon Kaen
18:00 (UTC+7)	Aphiwat Mitrak 73'; Jakkrit Jitsabay 82'	Report	Tadsawat Sriwilot 10' (o.g.)	Stadium: Khon Kaen PAO Stadium; Attendance: 1,291; Referee: Patiyut Monthianart; Assistant referees: Limonfine Poxpong, Tanakorn Chaikanya; Fourth official: Sittichai Saramai

Central region
The first qualification round of the 2026–27 Thai League Cup in the Central Region featured 6 clubs from the 2026–27 Thai League 3 Central Region.

5 September 2026	Ayutthaya PK (T3)	2–0	PTU Pathum Thani (T3)	Phra Nakhon Si Ayutthaya, Phra Nakhon Si Ayutthaya
15:30 (UTC+7)	Thummada Kokyai 90'; Thanawin Tanthatemi 90+3'	Report		Stadium: Stadium of Rajamangala University of Technology Suvarnabhumi, Huntra Campus; Attendance: 327; Referee: Pichit Thongjanmoon; Assistant referees: Jasada Tongkam, Thanankrid Noichanwong; Fourth official: Wilawan Rattanakhot

5 September 2026	Lopburi Poma (T3)	0–1	Kasem Bundit University (T3)	Mueang, Lopburi
15:30 (UTC+7)		Report	Phitak Pimpae 20'	Stadium: Jaifah Academy Stadium; Attendance: 150; Referee: Dassakhon Hokla; Assistant referees: Khomchalach Lekhawijit, Arpaporn Thaisoda; Fourth official: Nattaphak Sawasdee

6 September 2026	Futera United (T3)	1–0	Bangkapi (T3)	Khlong Luang, Pathum Thani
15:30 (UTC+7)	James Oise Jesuikhode 77'	Report		Stadium: Stadium of Bangkok University; Attendance: 120; Referee: Tibeth Longtree; Assistant referees: Bukhori Lehnuh, Pawarin Chukong; Fourth official: Phattrawuth Sunsri

Western region
The first qualification round of the 2026–27 Thai League Cup in the Western Region featured 2 clubs from the 2026–27 Thai League 3 Western Region.

6 September 2026	VRN Muangnont (T3)	2–2 (3–4 p)	Hua Hin City (T3)	Hua Hin, Prachuap Khiri Khan
15:30 (UTC+7)	Sosuke Kimura 27'; Asree Uma 81'	Report	Chayupol Vongsaroj 72' (pen.); Jirapat Klimkaew 90+2'	Stadium: Hua Hin Municipal Stadium; Attendance: 300; Referee: Boonsong Prachumrak; Assistant referees: Surasing Sukoubaoong, Narong Chaitong; Fourth official: Winai Riangwong
	Penalties
	Phanu Madbok (penalty missed); Asree Uma (penalty scored); Nathan Rongdet (penalty scored); Leslie Adjei Ablorh (penalty scored); Anirut Buttoum (penalty missed)		(penalty scored) David Songsumpao; (penalty scored) Sutin Iamsa-ard; (penalty scored) Chayupol Vongsaroj; (penalty missed) Prasit Pattanatanawisut; (penalty scored) Pornnarong Rodjakthuk

Southern region
The first qualification round of the 2026–27 Thai League Cup in the Southern Region featured 6 clubs from the 2026–27 Thai League 3 Southern Region.

5 September 2026	Yala City (T3)	1–4	Yala (T3)	Mueang, Yala
15:30 (UTC+7)	Afis Waeyama 45+2'	Report	Chakhrit Liwang 20'; Taylon Correa 31'; Cauã Costa Macedo Vieira da Silva 44', 57'	Stadium: Stadium of Thailand National Sports University, Yala Campus; Attendance: 1,120; Referee: Pissanusak Sriyai; Assistant referees: Satira Yunyongkait, Winai Jansang; Fourth official: Artit Srinoy

5 September 2026	Nakhon Si United (T3)	6–1	Muang Trang United (T3)	Mueang, Nakhon Si Thammarat
18:00 (UTC+7)	Jean Carlos Cloth Gonçalves 12', 45+5' (pen.), 68', 70'; Kanok Kongsimma 51', 59'	Report	Surachai Madchamnan 30'	Stadium: Nakhon Si Thammarat Provincial Stadium; Attendance: 401; Referee: Mayara Day; Assistant referees: Mayunai Kueteh, Ameen Puteh; Fourth official: Waeaburaham Cheabu

5 September 2026	Nara (T3)	1–1 (3–1 p)	Samui United (T3)	Mueang, Narathiwat
19:00 (UTC+7)	Pedro Lucas Jesus Paixão Martins 17' (pen.)	Report	Emmanuel Sonupe 80'	Stadium: Narathiwat PAO Stadium; Attendance: 1,027; Referee: Farid Baenak; Assistant referees: Fadeen Adae, Sofuwan Salae; Fourth official: Abdulrohim Sitiloh
	Penalties
	Pedro Lucas Jesus Paixão Martins (penalty scored); Rakpong Chumuang (penalty missed); Elson Hooi (penalty scored); Tanakorn Navanit (penalty scored)		(penalty missed) Tommy O'Sullivan; (penalty scored) Vincent Boesen; (penalty missed) Natdanai Makkarat; (penalty missed) Panyakorn Promcharoen

=== Second qualification round ===
The second qualification round includes 36 clubs from 2026–27 Thai League 3, the winners of the first qualification round, plus 24 new clubs from the same league. 54 goals were scored in this round.

Northern region
The second qualification round of the 2026–27 Thai League Cup in the Northern Region featured 4 clubs from the 2026–27 Thai League 3 Northern Region

12 September 2026	Kamphaengphet (T3)	0–2	Phichit United (T3)	Mueang, Kamphaeng Phet
15:00 (UTC+7)		Report	Ranyapakorn Konsanthia 71'; Suphachai Thammarak 73'	Stadium: Cha Kung Rao Stadium; Attendance: 250; Referee: Chookiat Boonchoo; Assistant referees: Suthipong Ontuwong, Kosit Laochaem; Fourth official: Tanyathon Phetch-udom

12 September 2026	Chiangmai (T3)	4–2	Northern Nakhon Mae Sot United (T3)	Mueang, Chiang Mai
18:00 (UTC+7)	Alisson Valdeli Spier da Silva 1', 82'; Jiranthanin Khamla 16', 86'	Report	Boonkerd Chaiyasin 35'; Pitsanu Ngamsanguan 55'	Stadium: Chiang Mai Municipal Stadium; Attendance: 1,396; Referee: Piyapong Thongkhain; Assistant referees: Kriangkrai Chaiya, Chumphon Khiaokhao; Fourth official: Supacha Chomchid

Northeastern region
The second qualification round of the 2026–27 Thai League Cup in the Northeastern Region featured 6 clubs from the 2026–27 Thai League 3 Northeastern Region.

12 September 2026	Udon Banjan United (T3)	2–1	Ubon Kruanapat (T3)	Mueang, Udon Thani
15:30 (UTC+7)	Thammayut Tonkham 32'; Felipe Micael 84'	Report	Thakdanai Phamchungkung 63'	Stadium: Stadium of Thailand National Sports University, Udon Thani Campus; Attendance: 413; Referee: Pongpat Kaewbowon; Assistant referees: Tanawat Boonma, Aassada Boonmala; Fourth official: Vitsawa Nanchana

12 September 2026	Esan Fighter (T3)	3–1	Pitchaya Bundit College (T3)	Mueang, Udon Thani
15:30 (UTC+7)	Bright Friday 9'; Naratip Kittikananurak 66'; Anuchit Somphakdee 77'	Report	Phongsaran Khongchangrit 79'	Stadium: Udon Thani SAT Stadium; Attendance: 500; Referee: Pisal Motongsri; Assistant referees: Bongkarn Sudtae, Jakkrit Nahuanin; Fourth official: Natthapol Sewakawihalee

13 September 2026	Khon Kaen (T3)	3–0	Roi Et PB United (T3)	Mueang, Khon Kaen
18:00 (UTC+7)	Jakkrit Jitsabay 30', 34'; Kittichai Yomkhot 73'	Report		Stadium: Khon Kaen PAO Stadium; Attendance: 1,325; Referee: Natthaphong Saengsuwannarat; Assistant referees: Tanade Intasan, Danesinghafrisenberg Hansen; Fourth official: Pongdanai Sadsadee

Eastern region
The second qualification round of the 2026–27 Thai League Cup in the Eastern Region featured 10 clubs from the 2026–27 Thai League 3 Eastern Region.

13 September 2026	Fleet (T3)	1–1 (5–3 p)	BFB Pattaya City (T3)	Sattahip, Chonburi
15:30 (UTC+7)	Somsak Musikaphan 68'	Report	Theerapat Theerachotsakun 18'	Stadium: Battleship Stadium; Attendance: 250; Referee: Theerayut Radarit; Assistant referees: Attapol Soheng, Tanongsak Singhawapee; Fourth official: Gittipak Mkamrat
	Penalties
	Thanawat Sodalee (penalty scored); Somsak Musikaphan (penalty scored); Andayut Nimnuch (penalty scored); Nathayu Marahen (penalty scored); Pakkaphon Phengsuay (penalty scored)		(penalty scored) Kanok Tapsai; (penalty scored) Theerapat Theerachotsakun; (penalty missed) Pongpipat Siriamornrattana; (penalty scored) Pawit Koedphon

13 September 2026	Pluakdaeng United (T3)	3–1	Customs United (T3)	Pluak Daeng, Rayong
15:30 (UTC+7)	Jakkarin Yaukyen 27'; Thanakrit Banjongkaew 35'; Chokchai Sukthed 87'	Report	Peeranat Jantarawong 33'	Stadium: CK Stadium; Attendance: 250; Referee: Nattipong Jaimuang; Assistant referees: Premsak Rungrueang, Piyanun Wattanawatchsuk; Fourth official: Chayapol Laosuphan

13 September 2026	Banbueng (T3)	0–1	Chachoengsao Hi-Tek (T3)	Ban Bueng, Chonburi
15:30 (UTC+7)		Report	Siriphat Khiawsongkhram 64'	Stadium: Chang Football Park; Attendance: 105; Referee: Ekkalak Muangkhotr; Assistant referees: Kanathip Waithaisong, Monruedee Junmai; Fourth official: Theerapon Nakthong

13 September 2026	Burapha United (T3)	3–0	Marines (T3)	Ban Bueng, Chonburi
17:00 (UTC+7)	Pathomchai Sueasakul 18'; Kritsana Kasemkulvilai 55'; Adisak Kraisorn 64'	Report		Stadium: Banbueng Municipal Stadium; Attendance: 671; Referee: Kanakorn Teansawat; Assistant referees: Adisai Pongnairat, Kodcharat Rattanachot; Fourth official: Panya Nawasimainam

13 September 2026	Padriew City (T3)	1–1 (4–3 p)	Navy (T3)	Mueang, Chachoengsao
17:00 (UTC+7)	Oibo Okhai Godspower 20'	Report	Akarawin Sawasdee 84'	Stadium: Chachoengsao Municipal Stadium; Attendance: 245; Referee: Watcharasak Intharak; Assistant referees: Jakkarin Pirunkan, Thitipong Thongprom; Fourth official: Chinnaphat Lablae
	Penalties
	Bernard Owusu Mintah (penalty missed); Kongpon Ployprapai (penalty scored); Natapon Srisawat (penalty scored); Pipattanapong Buntom (penalty scored); Siraphat Pintobtaeng (penalty scored)		(penalty scored) Akarawin Sawasdee; (penalty missed) Danilo; (penalty scored) Queran Verset; (penalty scored) Kan Kleabphueng; (penalty missed) Phutchapong Namsrithan

Central region
The second qualification round of the 2026–27 Thai League Cup in the Central Region featured 4 clubs from the 2026–27 Thai League 3 Central Region.

13 September 2026	Futera United (T3)	1–1 (2–4 p)	Singburi Warriors (T3)	Khlong Luang, Pathum Thani
15:30 (UTC+7)	James Oise Jesuikhode 47'	Report	Thanadon Yankaew 78' (pen.)	Stadium: Stadium of Bangkok University; Attendance: 158; Referee: Watchara Wongkhan; Assistant referees: Kittipon Meeporn, Sujin Rodart; Fourth official: Niruch Panjontuk
	Penalties
	Nattawut Jandit (penalty scored); Zaw Min Tun (penalty missed); Chanchai Phonchamroen (penalty scored); Khunpol Kijpracha (penalty missed)		(penalty scored) Thanadon Yankaew; (penalty scored) Rayner Moraes Costa; (penalty scored) Atthaphon Pannakhen; (penalty scored) Thanayut Hamanee

13 September 2026	Kasem Bundit University (T3)	2–2 (5–6 p)	Ayutthaya PK (T3)	Min Buri, Bangkok
15:30 (UTC+7)	Jovane Silva Cosme 45+1'; Bukkoree Lemdee 71' (o.g.)	Report	Suksan Bunta 42'; Anucha Phantong 54'	Stadium: Stadium of Kasem Bundit University; Attendance: 200; Referee: Pornpumin Chaiyo; Assistant referees: Nanthawat Chobsuan, Narinsak Thongkham; Fourth official: Titima Wongkhan
	Penalties
	Amad Heembenmad (penalty scored); Wanit Jaisaen (penalty missed); Supakrit Petpon (penalty scored); Nithikorn Bunjungam (penalty scored); Phitak Pimpae (penalty scored); Yossapat Sakprom (penalty scored); Sontaya Thotam (penalty missed)		(penalty scored) Manop Kittiphirun; (penalty missed) Nattapong Karuna; (penalty scored) Anucha Phantong; (penalty scored) Phurewat Aunthong; (penalty scored) Bukkoree Lemdee; (penalty scored) Phatchanon Ditson; (penalty scored) Kulawat Hatsathaphan

Western region
The second qualification round of the 2026–27 Thai League Cup in the Western Region featured 8 clubs from the 2026–27 Thai League 3 Western Region.

12 September 2026	Hua Hin City (T3)	0–3	Phetchaburi PBRU (T3)	Hua Hin, Prachuap Khiri Khan
15:30 (UTC+7)		Report	Pichaiyut Pratumthet 27'; Kanatip Sunnanon 90' (pen.); Chanyut Gannatep 90+3'	Stadium: Hua Hin Municipal Stadium; Attendance: 112; Referee: Winai Riangwong; Assistant referees: Patcharapon Losomsup, Pongsakorn Choosri; Fourth official: Thanaphon Chaowanon

12 September 2026	Samut Sakhon City (T3)	3–2	Suphanburi (T3)	Mueang, Samut Sakhon
15:30 (UTC+7)	Yuto Yoshijima 7'; Phuwanet Thongkhui 35', 67'	Report	Kittipong Seanphong 22'; Thanet Suknate 80'	Stadium: Stadium of Thailand National Sports University, Samut Sakhon Campus; Attendance: 457; Referee: Saravut Suksalee; Assistant referees: Atthaphon Somporncharoen, Pichaya Kasem; Fourth official: Krisit Homhual

12 September 2026	Thap Luang United (T3)	2–1	Samut Songkhram City (T3)	Mueang, Nakhon Pathom
18:00 (UTC+7)	Suksan Kaewpanya 36'; Opeyaemi Korede Ajayi 77' (pen.)	Report	Kritchanol Jantarasakul 2'	Stadium: Thap Luang United Janded Stadium; Attendance: 450; Referee: Pichit Thongjanmoon; Assistant referees: Bukhori Lehnuh, Thanapong Chunhakam; Fourth official: Den Bunyakittakun

12 September 2026	Bangkok (T3)	2–2 (5–4 p)	Thonburi United (T3)	Thung Khru, Bangkok
18:30 (UTC+7)	Carlos Eduardo dos Santos Lima 8'; Patchanon Saophet 40' (o.g.)	Report	Wipoo Kachawong 50'; Chayutphong Suthaphod 65'	Stadium: 72nd Anniversary Stadium, Bang Mot; Attendance: 1,076; Referee: Patcharapong Chiangtaphisut; Assistant referees: Yanin Nanthakampira, Chanitpol Tarawan; Fourth official: Vongsakorn Srisutto
	Penalties
	Greg Houla (penalty scored); Carlos Eduardo dos Santos Lima (penalty scored); Thitawee Aksornsri (penalty scored); Prachpeecha Pachthong (penalty scored); Kane Devid Jirakit Kidwell (penalty scored)		(penalty scored) Phakhawat Sapphaso; (penalty scored) Tanasrap Srikotapach; (penalty scored) Natthakorn Sangthong; (penalty scored) Amornwit Bunarpha; (penalty missed) Patchanon Saophet

Southern region
The second qualification round of the 2026–27 Thai League Cup in the Southern Region featured 4 clubs from the 2026–27 Thai League 3 Southern Region.

13 September 2026	Nakhon Si United (T3)	1–1 (5–4 p)	Nara (T3)	Mueang, Nakhon Si Thammarat
18:00 (UTC+7)	Kongpop Artserm 21'	Report	Elson Hooi 55'	Stadium: Nakhon Si Thammarat Provincial Stadium; Attendance: 335; Referee: Wisarut Damthaklong; Assistant referees: Aris Bissalimin, Muhammadkamael Duworbasor; Fourth official: Thanthon Kongdee
	Penalties
	Jean Carlos Cloth Gonçalves (penalty scored); Kingston Paris Simbai (penalty scored); Sajjaporn Tumsuwan (penalty scored); Sheldon Bateau (penalty missed); Kanok Kongsimma (penalty scored); David Bernard Henri Darbellay (penalty scored)		(penalty scored) Pedro Lucas Jesus Paixão Martins; (penalty missed) Ekkasit Chaobut; (penalty scored) Muhammadsaputro Doni; (penalty scored) Tanakorn Navanit; (penalty scored) Chatmongkol Rueangthanarot; (penalty missed) Nattapon Thaptanon

7 October 2026	Yala (T3)	1–0	PSU Surat Thani City (T3)	Mueang, Yala
19:00 (UTC+7)	Anon San-Mhard 74'	Report		Stadium: Stadium of Yala Rajabhat University; Attendance: 580; Referee: Anas Poheng; Assistant referees: Firhan Useng, Saifu Manae; Fourth official: Irfan Sama

=== Qualification play-off round ===
The qualification play-off round consists of 18 clubs from 2026–27 Thai League 3, winners of the second qualification round, alongside 14 new clubs from 2026–27 Thai League 2. The draw for this round took place on 7 October 2026. 63 goals were scored in this round.

3 November 2026	Fleet (T3)	1–5	Muangthong United (T2)	Sattahip, Chonburi
15:00 (UTC+7)	Somsak Musikaphan 8'	Report	Sarayut Yoosuebchuea 5', 86' (pen.); Pichaya Kongsri 9'; Thiraphat Nuntagowat 64'; Jessadakorn Noysri 90+2'	Stadium: Battleship Stadium; Attendance: 423; Referee: Metawin Chujit; Assistant referees: Anucha Pinamon, Nattphon Chuensamran; Fourth official: Nararit Srivorakul

3 November 2026	Samut Sakhon City (T3)	2–3 (a.e.t.)	Khon Kaen United (T2)	Mueang, Samut Sakhon
15:00 (UTC+7)	Yanapat Umong 46'; Donthachai Deephom 120+3'	Report	Petchphuwadol Konsingh 60'; Phalitchok Chitsompong 114'; Weerawat Jiraphaksiri 120+1'	Stadium: Stadium of Thailand National Sports University, Samut Sakhon Campus; Attendance: 373; Referee: Weeraphong Chaiyasuk; Assistant referees: Siwat Chaithong, Surasing Sukoubaoong; Fourth official: Kriangkrai Thiphanunjarukorn

3 November 2026	Phetchaburi PBRU (T3)	0–1	Mahasarakham CC (T2)	Mueang, Phetchaburi
17:00 (UTC+7)		Report	Chitchanok Xaysensourinthone 48' (pen.)	Stadium: Stadium of Phetchaburi Rajabhat University; Attendance: 154; Referee: Sila Jinnigorn; Assistant referees: Adisai Pongnairat, Chamnan Chomngam; Fourth official: Rangsan Kangchainguan

3 November 2026	Burapha United (T3)	4–1	Muang Loei United (T2)	Ban Bueng, Chonburi
17:00 (UTC+7)	Warayut Klomnak 36'; Thatchapol Chai-yan 61'; Kunburus Sounses 86'; Chalermsak Aukkee 89' (pen.)	Report	Ruan Santos Quadros de Almeida 68' (pen.)	Stadium: Banbueng Municipal Stadium; Attendance: 556; Referee: Pichet Chumcha; Assistant referees: Pakorn Srichumsin, Tibeth Longtree; Fourth official: Watcharasak Intharak

3 November 2026	Khon Kaen (T3)	2–0	Kasetsart (T2)	Mueang, Khon Kaen
18:00 (UTC+7)	Charin Boodhad 24'; Riku Motokawa 80'	Report		Stadium: Khon Kaen PAO Stadium; Attendance: 1,101; Referee: Jarin Yawapee; Assistant referees: Nuttapong Khunlert, Pirachat Horaplerd; Fourth official: Kittiwat Kittpaksakun

4 November 2026	Udon Banjan United (T3)	3–0	Police Tero (T2)	Mueang, Udon Thani
15:00 (UTC+7)	Phanthakan Artsombun 35'; Suwicha Chittabut 77'; Nontawat Wannit 87'	Report		Stadium: Stadium of Thailand National Sports University, Udon Thani Campus; Attendance: 250; Referee: Methas Kumarasit; Assistant referees: Nattapong Wadweangcom, Tanawat Boonma; Fourth official: Pisal Motongsri

4 November 2026	Singburi Warriors (T3)	0–8	Nakhon Pathom United (T2)	Mueang, Lopburi
15:00 (UTC+7)		Report	Warit Kengkoom 43'; Sunchai Chaolaokhwan 47'; Nutthapong Chuekamut 49'; Thanathon Chanphet 62', 78'; Thitipat Ekarunpong 68', 89', 90+1'	Stadium: Jaifah Academy Stadium; Attendance: 120; Referee: Anon Lohlor; Assistant referees: Apichat Prasasak, Nissan Janthep; Fourth official: Direk Kaort

4 November 2026	Esan Fighter (T3)	3–4	Thap Luang United (T3)	Mueang, Udon Thani
15:00 (UTC+7)	Abdelrahman Osama Mohamed 36', 43'; Dotsatorn Sukcharee 90+6'	Report	Atsada Homhual 13'; Pakarapon Mad-adam 45+2'; Thawin Artjinda 61'; Natthaphon Khotpakdee 67'	Stadium: Udon Thani SAT Stadium; Attendance: 30; Referee: Prakasit Chantarasawang; Assistant referees: Limonfine Poxpong, Peerapol Janthawan; Fourth official: Sarawut Thitsawang

4 November 2026	Ayutthaya PK (T3)	3–2 (a.e.t.)	Kanchanaburi Power (T2)	Phra Nakhon Si Ayutthaya, Phra Nakhon Si Ayutthaya
15:00 (UTC+7)	Narathip Kruearanya 57', 104'; Manop Kittiphirun 97'	Report	Krit Klangpan 5'; Nantawat Suankaew 120+4'	Stadium: Stadium of Rajamangala University of Technology Suvarnabhumi, Huntra Campus; Attendance: 215; Referee: Amnat Makklang; Assistant referees: Thanet Jairaw, Authen Dansalao; Fourth official: Nasri Tamat

4 November 2026	Pluakdaeng United (T3)	1–1 (a.e.t.) (5–3 p)	PT Satun (T2)	Pluak Daeng, Rayong
15:00 (UTC+7)	Jakkarin Yaukyen 63'	Report	Danuson Wijitpunya 31'	Stadium: CK Stadium; Attendance: 110; Referee: Ekkalak Muangkhotr; Assistant referees: Kiadtisak Janmol, Anupong Sangtopo; Fourth official: Chaiyos Sripak
	Penalties
	Mun Te-su (penalty scored); Chiraphong Raksongkham (penalty scored); Prawit Bureeted (penalty scored); Kittiphant Chanpho (penalty scored); Chokchai Sukthed (penalty scored)		(penalty scored) Nattawut Jaroenboot; (penalty scored) Danuson Wijitpunya; (penalty missed) Phanitan Peuangkeaw; (penalty scored) Thanawat Saipetch

4 November 2026	Nakhon Si United (T3)	1–2	Phichit United (T3)	Mueang, Nakhon Si Thammarat
18:00 (UTC+7)	Artit Sankla 90+3'	Report	Boubacar Koné 45+3'; Pratchaya Nuntanapiboon 77'	Stadium: Nakhon Si Thammarat Provincial Stadium; Attendance: 226; Referee: Artit Srinoy; Assistant referees: Hanyot Buangrab, Winai Jansang; Fourth official: Pissanusak Sriyai

4 November 2026	Padriew City (T3)	1–2 (a.e.t.)	Songkhla (T2)	Mueang, Chachoengsao
18:00 (UTC+7)	Achirawat Saimee 90+5'	Report	Nobparut Raksachum 77'; Phuchakhen Chandaeng 104'	Stadium: Chachoengsao Municipal Stadium; Attendance: 105; Referee: Natipong Aiemso; Assistant referees: Sahatnet Deemongkol, Pathompong Anunluksanakul; Fourth official: Theerapon Nakthong

4 November 2026	Chiangmai (T3)	6–1	Pattaya United (T2)	Mueang, Chiang Mai
18:00 (UTC+7)	Kongphob Kamasit 26', 47'; Isaac Aboagye 62', 63', 67'; Alisson Valdeli Spier da Silva 88'	Report	Jedsada Seriphunphat 82'	Stadium: Chiangmai Municipal Stadium; Attendance: 904; Referee: Bongkod Tiansavang; Assistant referees: Suwit Kongtongnok, Natthawut Tasmak; Fourth official: Wirot Oupachit

4 November 2026	Bangkok (T3)	2–1	Chainat Hornbill (T2)	Thung Khru, Bangkok
18:30 (UTC+7)	Carlos Eduardo dos Santos Lima 5', 45+3'	Report	Kandith Kaewchotchuangkool 30'	Stadium: 72nd Anniversary Stadium, Bang Mot; Attendance: 668; Referee: Suthipong Teekhasuk; Assistant referees: Kittinan Sotorphrphakorn, Bukhori Lehnuh; Fourth official: Pornpumin Chaiyo

4 November 2026	Yala (T3)	1–0	Chiangmai United (T2)	Mueang, Yala
19:00 (UTC+7)	Futtahan Duerahing 62'	Report		Stadium: Stadium of Yala Rajabhat University; Attendance: 620; Referee: Ameen Lorma; Assistant referees: Muhammadsaiyukee Seena, Satira Yunyongkait; Fourth official: Anwa Hayiyusoh

5 November 2026	Chachoengsao Hi-Tek (T3)	1–1 (a.e.t.) (4–5 p)	Nongbua Pitchaya (T2)	Mueang, Chachoengsao
18:00 (UTC+7)	Supasan Arjrod 109'	Report	Jakkrawut Songma 97'	Stadium: Chachoengsao Municipal Stadium; Attendance: 151; Referee: U-sen Yala; Assistant referees: Jagkrit Kaenkaew, Attapol Soheng; Fourth official: Danai Yommool
	Penalties
	Supasan Arjrod (penalty scored); Siriphat Khiawsongkhram (penalty scored); Tammapet Kangthong (penalty scored); Panussak Klongkamnuenkan (penalty missed); Jaden Marvin Meyer (penalty scored); Nyamsi Jacques Dominique (penalty missed)		(penalty scored) Caio Rodrigues da Cruz; (penalty scored) Pattaratron Buransuk; (penalty scored) Peeranan Baukhai; (penalty scored) Matheus Guedes; (penalty missed) Lucas de Lima Máximo; (penalty scored) Saharat Panmarchya

=== First round ===
The first round consists of 32 clubs. This includes 16 clubs advancing from the qualification play-off round, with 6 clubs representing the 2026–27 Thai League 2 and 10 clubs from the 2026–27 Thai League 3. Additionally, 16 top-tier clubs from the 2026–27 Thai League 1 joined the competition at this stage. The draw for this round took place on 5 November 2026. TBD goals were scored in this round.

== Tournament statistics ==
=== Hat-tricks ===
Player	For	Against	Result	Date	Round
(Brazil) Jean Carlos Cloth Gonçalves^{4}	Nakhon Si United (T3)	Muang Trang United (T3)	6–2 (H)	5 September 2026	First qualification round
(Thailand) Thitipat Ekarunpong	Nakhon Pathom United (T2)	Singburi Warriors (T3)	8–0 (A)	4 November 2026	Qualification play-off round
(Ghana) Isaac Aboagye	Chiangmai (T3)	Pattaya United (T2)	6–1 (H)	4 November 2026	Qualification play-off round

Notes: ^{4} = Player scored 4 goals; (H) = Home team; (A) = Away team

== See also ==
- 2026–27 Thai League 1
- 2026–27 Thai League 2
- 2026–27 Thai League 3
- 2026–27 Thai League 3 Northern Region
- 2026–27 Thai League 3 Central Region
- 2026–27 Thai League 3 Northeastern Region
- 2026–27 Thai League 3 Eastern Region
- 2026–27 Thai League 3 Western Region
- 2026–27 Thai League 3 Southern Region
- 2026–27 Thai League 3 National Championship
- 2026–27 Thai League 3 Cup
- 2026–27 Thai FA Cup
