= 2026–27 Thai League 2 =

Thai League 2
- Season: 2026–27
- Dates: 4 September 2026 – TBD 2027
- Matches: 99
- Goals: 275 (2.78 per match)
- Top goalscorer: Mubarak Ahmed (8 goals)
- Biggest home win: 4 goals total Uttaradit 4–0 Police Tero (7 November 2026)
- Biggest away win: 6 goals total Police Tero 0–6 Nongbua Pitchaya (1 November 2026)
- Highest scoring: 9 goals total Kanchanaburi Power 6–3 Chainat Hornbill (25 October 2026)
- Longest winning run: 5 matches Khonkaen United
- Longest unbeaten run: 6 matches Kanchanaburi Power; Khonkaen United; Uttaradit
- Longest winless run: 8 matches Mahasarakham; Songkhla
- Longest losing run: 3 matches Chanthaburi; Kasetsart; Police Tero; Songkhla
- Highest attendance: 6,489; Kanchanaburi Power 0–0 Chanthaburi (13 September 2026)
- Lowest attendance: 550; Songkhla 1–1 Muang Loei United (20 September 2026)
- Total attendance: 191,816
- Average attendance: 2,131
- All statistics correct as of 22 November 2026.

The 2026–27 Thai League 2 is the upcoming 29th season of the Thai League 2, the second-tier professional league for Thailand's association football clubs, since its establishment in 1997.

== Overview ==
18 teams will compete in the league – the twelve teams from the previous season, three teams relegated from Thai League 1 and three teams promoted from the Thai League 3.

== Teams ==
=== Teams changes ===
The following teams changed division since the 2025–26 season.

To Thai League 2
▼ Relegated from Thai League 1
- Muangthong United
- Nakhon Ratchasima
- Kanchanaburi Power
▲ Promoted from Thai League 3
- Uttaradit
- PT Satun
- Muang Loei United

From Championship
▲ Promoted to Thai League 1
- Rasisalai United
- Sisaket United
- Pattani
▼ Relegated to Thai League 3
- Trat
- Nakhon Si United
- Bangkok

=== Teams by province ===
Number	Province	Team(s)
2	Bangkok	Kasetsart and Police Tero
1	Chai Nat	Chainat Hornbill
1	Chanthaburi	Chanthaburi
1	Chiang Mai	Chiangmai United
1	Chonburi	Pattaya United
1	Kanchanaburi	Kanchanaburi Power
1	Khon Kaen	Khonkaen United
1	Loei	Muang Loei United
1	Maha Sarakham	Mahasarakham
1	Nakhon Pathom	Nakhon Pathom United
1	Nakhon Ratchasima	Nakhon Ratchasima
1	Nonthaburi	Muangthong United
1	Nong Bua Lamphu	Nongbua Pitchaya
1	Phrae	Phrae United
1	Satun	PT Satun
1	Songkhla	Songkhla
1	Uttaradit	Uttaradit

=== Stadiums and locations ===
Locations of teams in the 2026–27 Thai League 2
Locations of teams in the 2026–27 Thai League 2 from Bangkok Metropolitan Region

Team	Location	Stadium	Capacity	2025–26 season
Chainat Hornbill	Chai Nat	Khao Plong	12,000	6th in Thai League 2
Chanthaburi	Chanthaburi	Chanthaburi	5,000	14th in Thai League 2
Chiangmai United	Chiang Mai	Chiang Mai Rajabhat University Stadium	5,000	11th in Thai League 2
Kanchanaburi Power^{↓}	Kanchanaburi	Kleeb Bua	13,000	16th in Thai League 1
Kasetsart	Chatuchak	Insee Chantarasatit	4,000	16th in Thai League 2
Khonkaen United	Khon Kaen	Khon Kaen PAO	6,500	7th in Thai League 2
Mahasarakham	Maha Sarakham	Mahasarakham	4,500	8th in Thai League 2
Muangthong United^{↓}	Pak Kret	Thunderdome	13,000	14th in Thai League 1
Nakhon Pathom United	Nakhon Pathom	Nakhon Pathom Municipality Sport School Stadium	5,000	15th in Thai League 2
Nakhon Ratchasima^{↓}	Nakhon Ratchasima	80th Birthday	25,000	15th in Thai League 1
Muang Loei United^{↑}	Loei	Loei Rjabhat University Stadium	7,000	Promotion playoff runner-up
Nongbua Pitchaya	Nong Bua Lamphu	Pitchaya Stadium	6,000	4th in Thai League 2
Pattaya United	Pattaya	Nong Prue	5,500	12th in Thai League 2
Phrae United	Phrae	Huayma Stadium	3,000	10th in Thai League 2
Police Tero	Lak Si	NT Stadium	5,000	5th in Thai League 2
PT Satun^{↑}	Satun	Satun PAO	5,000	Promotion playoff winner
Songkhla	Mueang Songkhla	Tinsulanonda	20,000	13th in Thai League 2
Uttaradit^{↑}	Uttaradit	Uttaradit Province	3,245	Thai League 3 runner-up

^{↓}	Relegated from the Thai League 1
^{↑}	Promoted from the Thai League 3

=== Personnel and kits ===
Note: Flags indicate national team as has been defined under FIFA eligibility rules. Players may hold more than one non-FIFA nationality.

Team	Manager	Captain	Kit manufacturer	Kit sponsors	
Team	Manager	Captain	Kit manufacturer	Main	Other(s)
Chainat Hornbill	(Thailand national football team) Laksana Kamruen	(Thailand national football team) Mongkonchai Kongjumpa	(Thailand) Warrix	Credence TH	List: Front: BG Sports, Black Canyon Coffee, Muang Thai Insurance, Arunee Incense Sticks; Back: Sport Thai Bavaria; Sleeves: Thai AirAsia, Thammasat University; Shorts: None
Chanthaburi	(Thailand national football team) Teerasak Po-on	(Thailand national football team) Norraseth Lukthong	(Thailand) MSeven	Muang Thai Insurance	List: Front: Ek Paniengtong Foundation; Back: Saha Sila Kaew Co. Ltd., Rock$Presso, Central Chanthaburi, Thai-Cambodian Border Trade and Tourism Association of Chanthaburi; Sleeves: None; Shorts: None
Chiangmai United	(Thailand national football team) Surachai Jirasirichote	(Thailand national football team) Ronnapee Choeykamdee	(Thailand) AI Sport	Jele	List: Front: Chang, Muang Thai Insurance; Back: Tengoku, Speed Gym, Nuan Bakery; Sleeves: Thai AirAsia, Ground Recovery Club, SkyWash; Shorts: None
Kanchanaburi Power	(South Korea national football team) Park Hang-seo	(Thailand national football team) Prachya Fudsuparp	(Thailand) Imane	mMILK	List: Front: Elera, one2event.com; Back: None; Sleeves: Atime; Shorts: None
Kasetsart	(Thailand national football team) Jadet Meelarp	(Thailand national football team) Siwakorn Jakkuprasat	(Denmark) Hummel	Atlantic	List: Front: NBA Solar; Back: NB Advance Co. Ltd.; Sleeves: None; Shorts: None
Khonkaen United	(Thailand national football team) Supachai Komsilp	(Thailand national football team) Wasusiwakit Phusirit	(Thailand) Ego Sport	Muang Thai Insurance	List: Front: Fitness First, Sombat Tour, Leo; Back: KDD Selected; Sleeves: Ratchaphruek Hospital, BG Sports; Shorts: None
Mahasarakham	(Thailand national football team) Dusit Chalermsan	(Thailand national football team) Parinya Autapol	(Thailand) Ego Sport	CC Steel	List: Front: Leo, BG Sports, Muang Thai Insurance; Back: Ego Sport, DNA Soccer School, Nikon, BS Home Plus, Choiz Fitness, Singchai Ice; Sleeves: Kitiya School; Shorts: None
Muang Loei United	(Thailand national football team) Tana Chanabut	(Thailand national football team) Nopphon Phonkam	(Thailand) Volt	Mitr Phol	List: Front: Yamaha, JS.Sport, Chang, Muang Thai Insurance, The Viriyah Insurance, Silver Rock Arena, Giant Rock 1990; Back: None; Sleeves: MVP, Mobil 1; Shorts: None
Muangthong United	(Brazil national football team) Jose Alves Borges	(Philippines national football team) Michael Kempter	(Thailand) Ego Sport	Yamaha	List: Front: Mitsubishi Heavy Industries; Back: Coca-Cola; Sleeves: Thai AirAsia, Leo; Shorts: None
Nakhon Pathom United	(Thailand national football team) Thongchai Sukkoki	(Thailand national football team) Banjong Phadungpattanodom	(Denmark) Hummel	Chang	List: Front: None; Back: Oishi Green Tea, Est Cola, 100plus; Sleeves: ICE-LED, Central Nakhon Pathom, Muang Thai Insurance; Shorts: None
Nakhon Ratchasima	(Thailand national football team) Kraikiat Koonthanazap	(Thailand national football team) Kanokpon Buspakom	(Thailand) Volt	Mazda	List: Front: Leo, Energy Absolute; Back: FastFac, Thai AirAsia, Carrier, Major Cineplex; Sleeves: Muang Thai Insurance; Shorts: None
Nongbua Pitchaya	(Thailand national football team) Santi Chaiyaphuak	(Thailand national football team) Wutthichai Marom	(Thailand) Ego Sport	Pitchaya	List: Front: JS.Sport, Udon Thani International School, Leo, Muang Thai Life Insurance; Back: Solar Wing; Sleeves: None; Shorts: None
Pattaya United	(Thailand national football team) Woradet Phuprapai	(Thailand national football team) Narongrit Boonsuk	(Thailand) MSeven	Mittare Insurance	List: Front: BG Sports, Pullman Pattaya Hotel G; Back: Fitness Lifestyle; Sleeves: None; Shorts: None
Phrae United	(Thailand national football team) Ronachai Jinaket	(Thailand national football team) Laphonwich Sutthasen	(Thailand) PKP Sport	SAMART	List: Front: Chang, Muang Thai Life Insurance; Back: Phrae Sila; Sleeves: MKP; Shorts: None
Police Tero	(Japan national football team) Daiki Higuchi	(Brazil national football team) Valdo	(Thailand) FBT	Chang	List: Front: Muang Thai Insurance, Tero Entertainment; Back: The Library Publisher, JBP, Major Cineplex; Sleeves: Thai AirAsia, Muang Thai Life Assurance; Shorts: None
PT Satun	(Thailand national football team) Maka Hoprasartsuk	(Thailand national football team) Nattawut Jaroenboot	(Thailand) Won Der Y?	PTG Energy	List: Front: CP, Punthai Coffee, YVP, Muang Thai Insurance; Back: Narine Gold, Thai AirAsia; Sleeves: None; Shorts: None
Songkhla	(Thailand national football team) Arnon Bandasak	(Thailand national football team) Tachanon Nakarawong	(Thailand) Ego Sport	Muang Thai Insurance	List: Front: Mark Hatyai, Coca-Cola, Sri Trang Group, Laguna Grand Hotel & Spa; Back: BG Sports, Dairy Home, Thai Lion Air; Sleeves: Kohtaew Foods; Shorts: None
Uttaradit	(Thailand national football team) Anucha Chaiyawong	(Thailand national football team) Phufah Chuenkromrak	(Spain) Kelme		List: Front: None; Back: None; Sleeves: None; Shorts: None

1. Interim.
2. Apparel made by club.

=== Managerial changes ===
==== Pre-season ====
Team	Outgoing manager	Manner of departure	Date of vacancy	Replaced by	Date of appointment
Chanthaburi	(Thailand) Thongchai Rungreangles	End of contract	25 April 2026	(Thailand) Teerasak Po-on	11 June 2026
Khonkaen United	(Thailand) Teerasak Po-on	Sacked	28 April 2026	(Thailand) Supachai Komsilp	2 June 2026
Kanchanaburi Power	(South Korea) Lee Jung-soo	Restructuring	25 May 2026	(South Korea) Park Hang-seo	25 May 2026
Nakhon Ratchasima	(Thailand) Surapong Kongthep	End of contract	1 June 2026	(Thailand) Kraikiat Koonthanazap	8 June 2026
Nongbua Pitchaya	(Thailand) Sukrit Yothee	Resigned	12 June 2026	(Thailand) Santi Chaiyaphuak	8 June 2026
Songkhla	(Thailand) Pattharaphon Molito	End of Interim spell	7 July 2026	(Thailand) Arnon Bandasak	7 July 2026

==== During the season ====
Team	Outgoing manager	Manner of departure	Date of vacancy	Position in table	Replaced by	Date of appointment
Police Tero	(Thailand) Sitthichok Tassanai	Resigned	9 September 2026	6th	(Thailand) Somchai Makmool	9 September 2026
Pattaya United	(Thailand) Pipob On-Mo	Sacked	29 September 2026	15th	(Thailand) Woradet Phuprapai	28 September 2026
Kasetsart	(Cameroon) William Constant	Resigned	28 October 2026	18th	(Thailand) Jadet Meelarp	29 October 2026
Police Tero	(Thailand) Somchai Makmool	Sacked	3 November 2026	13th	(Thailand) Amorn Thammanarm (Caretaker)	3 November 2026
PT Satun	(Thailand) Nirun Assawapakdee	Resigned	8 November 2026	5th	(Thailand) Maka Hoprasartsuk	16 November 2026
Police Tero	(Thailand) Amorn Thammanarm (Caretaker)	End of interim spell	10 November 2026	15th	(Japan) Daiki Higuchi	10 November 2026

== Foreign players ==
Each team can register a maximum of five foreign players, including one player from the AFC and also one player from the AFF.

- Players named in **bold** indicates the player was registered during the mid-season transfer window.
- Former players named in italics are players that were out of squad or left the club within the season, after the pre-season transfer window, or in the mid-season transfer window, and at least had one appearance.

Note: Flags indicate national team as has been defined under FIFA eligibility rules. Players may hold more than one non-FIFA nationality.

Team	Player 1	Player 2	Player 3	Player 4	Player 5	Unregistered players	Former players
Chainat Hornbill	(France) Ousmane Badji	(Nigeria) Mubarak Ahmed	(United States) Elijah Douglas	(India) Aryan Bose			
Chanthaburi	(Brazil) Bruno Cantanhede	(Brazil) Vander Luis	(Ivory Coast) Amadou Ouattara	(Iran) Amirhossein Nemati			
Chiangmai United	(Brazil) Welington Smith	(South Korea) Jeong Woo-geun	(South Korea) Lee Jae-yong	(South Korea) Seo Min-guk			
Kanchanaburi Power	(Brazil) Jô Freitas	(Brazil) Patrick Marcelino	(Brazil) Róbson Duarte	(Madagascar) John Baggio			
Kasetsart	(Australia) Ata Inia	(Brazil) Bruno Dybal	(Brazil) Caio De Godoy	(Nigeria) Victor Ekene			
Khonkaen United	(Brazil) Rosalvo	(France) Allan Carneva	(France) Florian Cosyn	(South Korea) Kwon Dae-hee			
Mahasarakham	(Brazil) Gildo	(Brazil) Sávio Maciel	(South Korea) Kang Eun-su	(South Korea) Kang Hyun			
Muang Loei United	(Brazil) Ruan Quadros	(Brazil) Thiago Duchatsch	(Japan) Talla Ndao	(South Korea) Lee Seung-won			
Muangthong United	(Brazil) Rivaldinho	(Germany) Streli Mamba	(South Korea) Kim Dong-su	(Philippines) Michael Kempter			
Nakhon Pathom United	(Brazil) Douglas Tardin	(Brazil) Elias	(Iran) Amirali Chegini	(Iran) Mahan Rahmani			
Nakhon Ratchasima	(Brazil) Alef	(Brazil) Carlos Eduardo	(Brazil) Samuel Gomes	(South Korea) Jang Gun-hwan			
Nongbua Pitchaya	(Brazil) Caio Rodrigues	(Brazil) Luan Costa	(Brazil) Lucas Lima	(Brazil) Matheus Guedes			
Pattaya United	(Brazil) André Luís	(Brazil) Evson Patrício	(Brazil) Tiago Chulapa	(Germany) Meritan Shabani			
Phrae United	(Brazil) Kainã Nunes	(Brazil) Victor Capinan	(Japan) Kento Nagasaki	(Japan) Taku Ito			
Police Tero	(Brazil) Jeferson	(Brazil) Valdo	(Brazil) Washington Brandão	(Japan) Kei Sano	(Timor-Leste) Pedro Henrique		
PT Satun	(Brazil) Caio da Silva	(Brazil) Janclesio	(Brazil) Jhon Cley	(Colombia) Maurício Cortés			
Songkhla	(Brazil) Alex Flávio	(Brazil) Amarildo	(Brazil) Mosquito	(Martinique) Steeven Langil			
Uttaradit	(Brazil) Brendon Lucas	(Brazil) Judivan	(Brazil) Luan Santos	(Brazil) Werick Caetano			

=== Foreign players by confederation ===
Foreign players by confederation
AFC
CAF
CONCACAF
CONMEBOL
OFC
UEFA

== Standings ==
=== League table ===
Pos	Team	Pld	W	D	L	GF	GA	GD	Pts	Promotion, qualification or relegation
1	Khonkaen United	11	8	1	2	21	9	+12	25	Promotion to Thai League 1
2	Kanchanaburi Power	11	5	5	1	21	12	+9	20	Promotion to Thai League 1
3	Uttaradit	11	5	4	2	22	14	+8	19	Qualification for the Promotion playoff
4	Nongbua Pitchaya	11	5	3	3	27	16	+11	18	Qualification for the Promotion playoff
5	Nakhon Pathom United	11	4	5	2	19	15	+4	17	Qualification for the Promotion playoff
6	Muangthong United	11	5	2	4	13	12	+1	17	Qualification for the Promotion playoff
7	Phrae United	11	5	2	4	13	12	+1	17	
8	Nakhon Ratchasima	11	4	4	3	16	12	+4	16	
9	PT Satun	11	4	4	3	17	15	+2	16	
10	Muang Loei United	11	4	3	4	18	16	+2	15	
11	Chainat Hornbill	11	4	3	4	19	21	−2	15	
12	Pattaya United	11	4	3	4	12	17	−5	15	
13	Chiangmai United	11	3	4	4	13	15	−2	13	
14	Police Tero	11	4	1	6	12	24	−12	13	
15	Chanthaburi	11	2	4	5	8	10	−2	10	
16	Mahasarakham	11	2	4	5	12	21	−9	10	Relegation to Thai League 3
17	Songkhla	11	1	4	6	13	22	−9	7	Relegation to Thai League 3
18	Kasetsart	11	1	2	8	8	21	−13	5	Relegation to Thai League 3

Updated to match(es) played on 22 November 2026. Source: Thai League 2 2026–27
Rules for classification: 1) Points; 2) Head-to-head points; 3) Head-to-head goals difference; 4) Head-to-head goals scored; 5) Overall goals difference; 6) Overall goals scored; 7) Fair play points; 8) Play-off without extra time.

=== Position by round ===
The table lists the positions of teams after each week of matches. In order to preserve chronological evolvements, any postponed matches are not included in the round at which they were originally scheduled, but added to the full round they were played immediately afterwards. For example, if a match is scheduled for matchday 13, but then postponed and played between days 16 and 17, it will be added to the standings for day 16.

Team ╲ Round	1	2	3	4	5	6	7	8	9	10	11	12	13	14	15	16	17	18	19	20	21	22	23	24	25	26	27	28	29	30	31	32	33	34
Khonkaen United	4	1	4	1	5	2	1	1	1	1	1	1																						
Kanchanaburi Power	1	3	6	8	12	7	6	5	6	4	2																							
Uttaradit	12	4	7	2	1	1	3	2	3	2	3																							
Nongbua Pitchaya	3	7	8	4	7	3	4	3	2	3	4																							
Nakhon Pathom United	7	12	14	13	8	13	10	13	10	8	5																							
Muangthong United	11	5	12	6	11	14	14	10	7	10	6																							
Phrae United	17	16	17	14	9	6	9	9	11	9	7																							
Nakhon Ratchasima	8	13	15	17	16	15	13	7	4	6	8																							
PT Satun	16	8	2	7	3	4	5	4	5	5	9																							
Muang Loei United	15	6	1	3	6	9	11	14	14	12	10																							
Chainat Hornbill	2	10	11	5	2	5	2	6	8	7	11																							
Pattaya United	5	11	13	15	15	11	15	15	15	13	12																							
Chiangmai United	14	9	3	9	4	8	7	8	9	11	13																							
Police Tero	6	2	5	10	10	12	8	12	13	15	14																							
Chanthaburi	13	14	10	12	13	10	12	11	12	14	15																							
Mahasarakham	9	17	16	16	17	18	17	17	17	17	16																							
Songkhla	10	15	9	11	14	16	16	16	16	16	17																							
Kasetsart	18	18	18	18	18	17	18	18	18	18	18																							

Leader and qualification to the 2027–28 Thai League
Promotion to the 2027–28 Thai League
Play off to the 2027–28 Thai League
Relegation to the 2027–28 Thai League 3

First match(es) will be played on 4 September 2026. Source: Thai League 2 2026–27

== Promotion play-offs ==
=== Bracket ===
Semifinal
5
4
6
3

Final

=== Matches ===
Semifinal 1

2027	5th-placed of Thai League 2	v	4th-placed of Thai League 2
--:-- UTC+7

2027	4th-placed of Thai League 2	v	5th-placed of Thai League 2
--:-- UTC+7

Semifinal 2

2027	6th-placed of Thai League 2	v	3rd-placed of Thai League 2
--:-- UTC+7

2027	3rd-placed of Thai League 2	v	6th-placed of Thai League 2
--:-- UTC+7

Final

2027	Winner of Semifinal 1	v	Winner of Semifinal 2
--:-- UTC+7

2027	Winner of Semifinal 2	v	Winner of Semifinal 1
--:-- UTC+7

=== Result by round ===
Team ╲ Round	1	2	3	4	5	6	7	8	9	10	11	12	13	14	15	16	17	18	19	20	21	22	23	24	25	26	27	28	29	30	31	32	33	34
Chainat Hornbill	W	L	D	W	W	L	W	L	D	D	L																							
Chanthaburi	L	D	W	L	D	W	D	D	L	L	L																							
Chiangmai United	L	W	W	L	W	L	D	D	D	D	L																							
Kanchanaburi Power	W	D	D	D	L	W	D	W	D	W	W																							
Kasetsart	L	L	L	D	L	W	L	L	D	L	L																							
Khonkaen United	W	W	L	W	L	W	W	W	W	W	D																							
Mahasarakham	D	L	D	D	L	L	D	L	W	L	W																							
Muang Loei United	L	W	W	D	D	L	D	L	L	W	W																							
Muangthong United	D	W	L	W	L	L	D	W	W	L	W																							
Nakhon Pathom United	D	D	D	D	W	L	W	L	D	W	W																							
Nakhon Ratchasima	D	L	D	L	D	W	W	W	W	L	D																							
Nongbua Pitchaya	W	L	D	W	D	W	L	W	W	D	L																							
Pattaya United	W	L	D	L	D	W	L	L	D	W	W																							
Phrae United	L	D	L	W	W	W	L	D	L	W	W																							
Police Tero	W	W	L	L	D	L	W	L	L	L	W																							
PT Satun	L	W	W	L	W	D	D	W	D	D	L																							
Songkhla	D	L	W	D	L	L	D	D	L	L	L																							
Uttaradit	D	W	D	W	W	D	L	W	D	W	L																							

Source: Thai League 2 2025–26

== Results ==
=== Fixture and result ===
Home \ Away	CHB	CTB	CMU	KBP	KSE	KKU	MSK	MLU	MTU	NPU	NRA	NON	PTY	PHR	PTE	STN	SKA	UTD
Chainat Hornbill					1–1				2–3				0–0	3–1			2–0	3–2
Chanthaburi			0–0		2–0	0–1				3–0		0–0		0–3				
Chiangmai United					2–0	3–1				2–5			0–1				1–1	1–1
Kanchanaburi Power	6–3	0–0					1–1				1–0				1–0			
Kasetsart							3–1	0–1		0–0						1–3		0–2
Khonkaen United	2–1						3–0	4–2							2–0		3–2	
Mahasarakham		1–0							0–0		1–1					3–0	1–1	2–3
Muang Loei United	3–0			1–1					1–3				2–2	2–0				2–1
Muangthong United			1–0									2–1	1–2	0–1	4–1			
Nakhon Pathom United				1–1			6–2		1–0		2–2	4–3						
Nakhon Ratchasima	1–2		1–2			0–0		3–2					2–0				4–1	
Nongbua Pitchaya	2–2		3–1		2–0		3–0									4–3		
Pattaya United				2–2	2–0	0–2								0–3	0–3		3–2	
Phrae United				2–1		0–3				0–0	0–1	2–1						
Police Tero		1–0			5–3			1–0			1–1	0–6					0–3	
PT Satun		0–0	1–1	2–4		1–0			3–0	0–0								
Songkhla				0–3				1–1						1–1		1–3		
Uttaradit		4–3							0–0	2–0		2–2			4–0	1–1		

Updated to match(es) played on 22 November 2026. Source: Thai League 2 2026–27
Legend: Blue = home team win; Yellow = draw; Red = away team win.
For upcoming matches, an "a" indicates there is an article about the rivalry between the two participants.

== Season statistics ==
=== Top Goalscorers ===
As of 20 November 2026.

Rank	Player	Club	Goals
1	(Nigeria) Mubarak Ahmed	Chainat Hornbill	8
2	(Brazil) Samuel Gomes	Nakhon Ratchasima	6
2	(Brazil) Caio Rodrigues	Nongbua Pitchaya	6
2	(Brazil) Caio da Silva	PT Satun	6
5	(Thailand) Piyanat Thodsanid	Kanchanaburi Power	5
5	(Thailand) Chitchanok Xaysensourinthone	Mahasarakham	5
5	(Brazil) Elias De Souza	Nakhon Pathom United	5
5	(Brazil) Tiago Chulapa	Pattaya United	5
5	(Timor-Leste) Pedro Henrique	Police Tero	5
10	(Brazil) Róbson Duarte	Kanchanaburi Power	4
10	(Madagascar) John Baggio	Kanchanaburi Power	4
10	(Brazil) Luan Costa	Nongbua Pitchaya	4
10	(Brazil) Kainã Nunes	Phrae United	4
10	(Brazil) Mosquito	Songkhla	4
10	(Brazil) Brendon Lucas	Uttaradit	4
10	(Thailand) Kritsada Sriwanit	Uttaradit	4

=== Hat-trick ===
Player	For	Against	Result	Date
(Timor-Leste) Pedro Henrique^{4}	Police Tero	Kasetsart	5–3 (H)	17 October 2026
(Brazil) Elias De Souza^{4}	Nakhon Pathom United	Mahasarakham	6–2 (H)	8 November 2026
(Brazil) Elias De Souza^{4}	Nakhon Pathom United	Chiangmai United	5–2 (A)	21 November 2026

=== Clean sheets ===
As of 20 November 2026.

Rank	Player	Club	Goals
1	(Thailand) Prin Goonchorn	Chanthaburi	6
2	(Thailand) Tanachai Noorach	Khonkaen United	5
3	(Thailand) Kiadtiphon Udom	Phrae United	4
4	(Thailand) Sumethee Khokpho	Kanchanaburi Power	3
4	(Thailand) Pairot Eiammak	Muang Loei United	3
4	(Thailand) Kiadtisak Chaodon	Nakhon Pathom United	3
4	(Thailand) Anipong Kijkam	Police Tero	3
4	(Thailand) Amran Bungosayu	PT Satun	3
9	(Thailand) Siraset Aekprathumchai	Chainat Hornbill	2
9	(Thailand) Kanapod Kadee	Muangthong United	2
9	(Thailand) Thanaphat Nirandorn	Nakhon Ratchasima	2
9	(Thailand) Kittipong Phuthawchueak	Nongbua Pitchaya	2
9	(Thailand) Kittisak Moosawat	Nongbua Pitchaya	2
9	(Thailand) Varuth Wongsomsak	Pattaya United	2
9	(Thailand) Chakhon Philakhlang	Uttaradit	2
9	(Thailand) Itthipon Kamsuprom	Uttaradit	2
17	(Thailand) Phanuphong Sunon	Chiangmai United	1
17	(Thailand) Phumniwat Thuha	Chiangmai United	1
17	(Thailand) Thirawooth Sruanson	Kasetsart	1
17	(Thailand) Chaloempat Ploywanrattana	Mahasarakham	1
17	(Thailand) Kittikun Jamsuwan	Mahasarakham	1
17	(Thailand) Korrakot Pipatnadda	Muangthong United	1
17	(Thailand) Watchara Buathong	PT Satun	1
17	(Thailand) Jirunpong Thamasiha	Songkhla	1

== Attendances ==
=== Overall ===
Pos	Team	Total	High	Low	Average	Change
1	Kanchanaburi Power	27,869	6,489	4,362	5,574	+9.4%^{†}
2	Khonkaen United	24,430	5,145	4,405	4,886	+43.3%
3	PT Satun	28,581	6,111	3,572	4,764	n/a^{‡}
4	Muangthong United	13,462	3,058	2,234	2,692	−46.5%^{†}
5	Mahasarakham	10,246	3,344	1,415	2,049	−3.4%
6	Uttaradit	12,148	2,752	1,707	2,025	n/a^{‡}
7	Muang Loei United	10,015	3,147	1,485	2,003	n/a^{‡}
8	Pattaya United	8,909	2,224	1,399	1,782	+1.5%
9	Nakhon Ratchasima	7,623	1,932	1,248	1,525	−51.6%^{†}
10	Chanthaburi	8,707	3,293	837	1,451	+21.6%
11	Nongbua Pitchaya	7,222	1,807	1,224	1,444	+4.9%
12	Chainat Hornbill	7,104	1,754	1,211	1,421	−2.3%
13	Police Tero	5,491	1,124	1,025	1,098	−13.9%
14	Songkhla	3,252	1,990	550	1,084	+26.2%
15	Chiangmai United	4,755	1,274	702	951	+59.6%
16	Nakhon Pathom United	4,690	1,356	750	938	+6.1%
17	Kasetsart	4,252	1,292	580	850	+3.7%
18	Phrae United	3,060	952	528	844	+42.8%
	League total	191,816	6,489	550	2,131	+31.9%

Updated to games played on 8 November 2026
Source: Thai League 2 2026–27
Notes:
^{†} Teams played previous season in Thai League 1
^{‡} Teams played previous season in Thai League 3

=== Home match played ===
As of 8 November 2026

Team \ Match played	1	2	3	4	5	6	7	8	9	10	11	12	13	14	15	16	17	Total
Chainat Hornbill	1,754	1,211	1,235	1,529	1,375													7,104
Chanthaburi	3,293	1,579	1,109	962	927	837												8,707
Chiangmai United	933	1,025	821	702	1,274													4,755
Kanchanaburi Power	6,489	5,348	4,362	5,259	6,411													27,869
Kasetsart	1,292	725	580	959	696													4,252
Khonkaen United	5,145	5,057	4,405	4,962	4,861													24,430
Mahasarakham	1,524	1,840	2,123	3,344	1,415													10,246
Muang Loei United	1,485	1,542	1,785	2,056	3,147													10,015
Muangthong United	2,234	2,878	3,058	2,817	2,475													13,462
Nakhon Pathom United	956	850	1,356	778	750													4,690
Nakhon Ratchasima	1,932	1,321	1,248	1,469	1,653													7,623
Nongbua Pitchaya	1,807	1,565	1,224	1,234	1,392													7,222
Pattaya United	1,871	1,483	1,399	1,932	2,224													8,909
Phrae United	756	824	952	528														3,060
Police Tero	1,035	1,025	1,124	1,092	1,215													5,491
PT Satun	5,000	5,000	6,111	4,412	4,486	3,572												28,581
Songkhla	1,990	550	712															3,252
Uttaradit	2,752	1,875	1,830	2,137	1,847	1,707												12,148
League total																		191,816

Source: Thai League 2 2026–27

== See also ==
- 2026–27 Thai League 1
- 2026–27 Thai League 3
- 2026 Thailand Semi-pro League
- 2026–27 Thai League Cup
