= 2026–27 Thai League 3 =

9th season of the Thai League 3

- Season: 2026–27
- Dates: 18 September 2026 – TBD

The 2026–27 Thai League 3 was the tenth season of the Thai League 3, the third tier of professional football in Thailand. Organised by the Football Association of Thailand and Thai League Co., Ltd., the competition featured 69 clubs divided into six regional groups: Northern (12 clubs), Northeastern (12 clubs), Eastern (11 clubs), Central (12 clubs), Western (12 clubs), and Southern (10 clubs). For sponsorship purposes, the league was branded as the BYD DOLPHIN League III, named after the BYD Dolphin, an electric car model produced by Chinese automotive manufacturer BYD Auto.

The season began on 18 September 2026 and was contested in two stages. In the Regional Stage, clubs competed against other clubs within their respective regions in a round-robin format featuring home-and-away matches. The champions and runners-up from each region advanced to the National Championship Stage, which featured 12 clubs. The winners, runners-up, and winner of the third-place play-off were promoted to the Thai League 2 for the 2027–28 season.

== Seasonal Changes ==
The 2026–27 Thai League 3 season features several changes compared to the previous campaign. These include an increase in the number of participating clubs from 68 to 69, changes to the format of the National Championship Stage, and revised ranking criteria for clubs finishing level on points. The competition continues to be sponsored by BYD Auto and broadcast on AIS Play.

=== Format ===
Compared to the previous season, the overall two-stage structure of the competition remains unchanged, with the Regional Stage followed by the National Championship Stage. However, the distribution of clubs among the six regional groups has changed, with the Central and Western regions increasing from 11 to 12 clubs, while the Eastern Region decreases from 12 to 11 clubs. The Northern, Northeastern, and Southern regions remain unchanged at 12, 12, and 10 clubs respectively.

The format of the National Championship Stage has also been revised. In the previous season, the 12 regional champions and runners-up were divided into three groups. In 2026–27, they are divided into two groups based on geographical location. Clubs compete on a home-and-away basis against clubs from other regional groups within their group, while clubs from the same regional group do not play each other. The top two clubs from each group advance to the semi-finals, with the semi-finals, final, and third-place play-off all contested over two legs. The top three clubs in the National Championship Stage are promoted to the Thai League 2 for the 2027–28 season, with the third-placed club determined by a third-place play-off.

The criteria for determining the standings have also been changed. In previous seasons, head-to-head results were used as the primary tiebreaker when two or more clubs finished level on points. From the 2026–27 season, goal difference in all matches is used as the first tiebreaker, followed by the other criteria specified in the competition regulations.

=== Relegation from Thai League 2 ===
Originally, three clubs were scheduled to be relegated from the 2025–26 Thai League 2 to the Thai League 3. The relegated clubs were Kasetsart, Nakhon Si United, and Bangkok, who finished in the bottom three positions of the league standings.

However, Trat, who finished ninth and had secured their survival in Thai League 2, failed to obtain a licence to participate in the 2026–27 season. The club subsequently dissolved after the conclusion of the 2025–26 season. As Trat were unable to participate, Kasetsart, the highest-placed club among those originally facing relegation, retained their place in Thai League 2 for the 2026–27 season.

Consequently, only two clubs were relegated to Thai League 3: Nakhon Si United and Bangkok. Nakhon Si United were placed in the Southern region, while Bangkok were placed in the Western region in accordance with the locations of their respective home grounds.

=== Promotions from Thailand Semi-pro League ===
The six regional champions of the 2026 Thailand Semi-pro League earned automatic promotion to the 2026–27 Thai League 3. In addition, runners-up from certain regional groups were promoted as special cases to maintain a balanced number of clubs across the six regions of Thai League 3.

Northern Region

- TNSU Lampang – promoted as regional champions.
- Paknampho – promoted as runners-up under a special quota.

Northeastern Region

- Esan Fighter – promoted as regional champions.
- Pitchaya Bundit College – promoted as runners-up under a special quota.

Eastern Region

- MNK – promoted as regional champions.
- Banbueng – promoted as runners-up under a special quota.

Central Region

- Ayutthaya PK – promoted as regional champions.
- Bangkapi – promoted as runners-up under a special quota.

Western Region

- Phetchaburi – promoted as regional champions, later renamed Phetchaburi PBRU.

Southern Region

- Nara – promoted as regional champions.
- Yala City – promoted as runners-up under a special quota.

=== Promotion to Thai League 2 ===
The top three clubs in the 2025–26 Thai League 3 National Championship Stage were eligible for promotion to the 2026–27 Thai League 2, subject to obtaining the required club licence. Nara United, Uttaradit, and PT Satun finished first, second, and third respectively, but Nara United failed to obtain a licence for the Thai League 2. As a result, their promotion place was awarded to Muang Loei United, who had finished fourth after losing the third-place play-off and subsequently obtained a Thai League 2 licence. Uttaradit, PT Satun, and Muang Loei United therefore gained promotion to the 2026–27 Thai League 2.

=== Clubs relegated due to club licensing failures ===
Under the club licensing regulations, a club must obtain a licence at the level of competition in which it intends to participate, or a higher level. Clubs that fail to obtain the required licence are not permitted to compete at that level and may be relegated to a lower division for the following season. Several clubs were relegated from the 2025–26 Thai League 3 to the Thailand Semi-pro League after failing to obtain a Thai League 3 club licence for the 2026–27 season.

- Bankhai United, who finished fifth in the Eastern Region, failed to obtain a Thai League 3 club licence and were relegated to the Thailand Semi-pro League.
- Saimit Kabin United, who finished sixth in the Eastern Region, failed to obtain a Thai League 3 club licence and were relegated to the Thailand Semi-pro League.
- Nara United, the Southern Region champions and national champions of the 2025–26 Thai League 3, failed to obtain a Thai League 2 club licence after qualifying for promotion. The club also failed to obtain a Thai League 3 club licence and was therefore ineligible to participate in either professional division, resulting in its relegation to the Thailand Semi-pro League.

=== Clubs relegated due to finishing last in their regions ===
Alongside the licensing-related relegations, six clubs were demoted from Thai League 3 after finishing at the bottom of their respective regional leagues in the 2025–26 season.

- Nakhon Sawan See Khwae City (Northern region)
- Surin Khong Chee Mool (Northeastern region)
- ACDC (Eastern region)
- Saraburi United (Central region)
- Nonthaburi United (Western region)
- Krabi (Southern region)

=== Club name and logo changes ===
Several clubs have rebranded or changed their logos for the 2026–27 season:

- Chiangrai TSC (Northern region) introduced a new club logo for the 2026–27 season, replacing the previous design with a red-and-gold shield featuring four emblematic elements and a central banner bearing the club's name, "CHIANGRAI TSC FC".
- Roi Et PB United (Northeastern region) introduced a new club logo for the 2026–27 season, replacing the previous red-and-gold design with a predominantly purple-and-white design while retaining the club's overall shield-shaped identity.
- Lopburi City (Central region) was renamed Lopburi Poma, with the word "CITY" on the club logo replaced by "POMA FC".
- Phetchaburi (Western region), newly promoted from the Thailand Semi-pro League, was renamed Phetchaburi PBRU, with "PBRU" added to the club logo to reflect the new name.
- Ranong United (Southern region) was renamed Ranong PJ United, with "PJ" added between "RANONG" and "UTD" on the club logo.

== Regional stage ==
The Regional Stage of the 2026–27 Thai League 3 includes 69 clubs divided into six regions: Northern (12 clubs), Northeastern (12 clubs), Eastern (11 clubs), Central (12 clubs), Western (12 clubs), and Southern (10 clubs). Each region operates in a round-robin format where clubs play each other in both home and away matches. The top two clubs from each region, the champion and the runner-up, qualify for the National Championship Stage. This stage serves to determine the regional winners and which clubs advance to the national competition.

=== Northern region ===
League table

Pos	Team	Pld	W	D	L	GF	GA	GD	Pts	Qualification or relegation
1	Phitsanulok	1	1	0	0	3	0	+3	3	Qualification to the National Championship stage
2	Kamphaengphet	1	1	0	0	3	1	+2	3	Qualification to the National Championship stage
3	Phichit United	1	1	0	0	3	1	+2	3	
4	Northern Nakhon Mae Sot United	1	1	0	0	2	0	+2	3	
5	Maejo United	1	1	0	0	1	0	+1	3	
6	Chiangmai	1	0	1	0	1	1	0	1	
7	Chiangrai TSC	1	0	1	0	1	1	0	1	
8	Khelang United	1	0	0	1	0	1	−1	0	
9	Chattrakan City	1	0	0	1	1	3	−2	0	
10	TNSU Lampang	1	0	0	1	1	3	−2	0	
11	Paknampho	1	0	0	1	0	2	−2	0	
12	Chiangrai City	1	0	0	1	0	3	−3	0	Relegation to the Thailand Semi-pro League

Updated to match(es) played on 20 September 2026. Source: Thai League
Rules for classification: 1) Points; 2) Overall goal difference; 3) Overall goals scored; 4) Head-to-head points; 5) Head-to-head goal difference; 6) Head-to-head goals scored; 7) Fair play points.

=== Northeastern region ===
League table

Pos	Team	Pld	W	D	L	GF	GA	GD	Pts	Qualification or relegation
1	Pitchaya Bundit College	1	1	0	0	4	0	+4	3	Qualification to the National Championship stage
2	Udon Banjan United	1	1	0	0	3	1	+2	3	Qualification to the National Championship stage
3	EUMT	1	1	0	0	3	2	+1	3	
4	Roi Et PB United	1	1	0	0	2	1	+1	3	
5	Khon Kaen	1	0	1	0	2	2	0	1	
6	Udon United	1	0	1	0	2	2	0	1	
7	Korat City	1	0	1	0	0	0	0	1	
8	Ubon Kruanapat	1	0	1	0	0	0	0	1	
9	Esan Fighter	1	0	0	1	2	3	−1	0	
10	Yasothon	1	0	0	1	1	2	−1	0	
11	Surin City	1	0	0	1	1	3	−2	0	
12	Khon Kaen Mordindang	1	0	0	1	0	4	−4	0	Relegation to the Thailand Semi-pro League

Updated to match(es) played on 20 September 2026. Source: Thai League
Rules for classification: 1) Points; 2) Overall goal difference; 3) Overall goals scored; 4) Head-to-head points; 5) Head-to-head goal difference; 6) Head-to-head goals scored; 7) Fair play points.

=== Eastern region ===
League table

Pos	Team	Pld	W	D	L	GF	GA	GD	Pts	Qualification or relegation
1	Customs United	1	1	0	0	5	1	+4	3	Qualification to the National Championship stage
2	Burapha United	1	1	0	0	4	0	+4	3	Qualification to the National Championship stage
3	BFB Pattaya City	1	1	0	0	2	1	+1	3	
4	Fleet	1	1	0	0	2	1	+1	3	
5	Marines	1	1	0	0	2	1	+1	3	
6	Pluakdaeng United	0	0	0	0	0	0	0	0	
7	Banbueng	1	0	0	1	1	2	−1	0	
8	Chachoengsao Hi-Tek	1	0	0	1	1	2	−1	0	
9	Navy	1	0	0	1	1	2	−1	0	
10	MNK	1	0	0	1	1	5	−4	0	
11	Padriew City	1	0	0	1	0	4	−4	0	Relegation to the Thailand Semi-pro League

Updated to match(es) played on 20 September 2026. Source: Thai League
Rules for classification: 1) Points; 2) Overall goal difference; 3) Overall goals scored; 4) Head-to-head points; 5) Head-to-head goal difference; 6) Head-to-head goals scored; 7) Fair play points.

=== Central region ===
League table

Pos	Team	Pld	W	D	L	GF	GA	GD	Pts	Qualification or relegation
1	Royal Thai Air Force	1	1	0	0	7	2	+5	3	Qualification to the National Championship stage
2	North Bangkok University	1	1	0	0	4	0	+4	3	Qualification to the National Championship stage
3	Angthong	1	1	0	0	3	0	+3	3	
4	Kasem Bundit University	1	1	0	0	2	0	+2	3	
5	Futera United	1	1	0	0	2	1	+1	3	
6	PTU Pathum Thani	1	0	1	0	1	1	0	1	
7	Singburi Warriors	1	0	1	0	1	1	0	1	
8	Bangkapi	1	0	0	1	1	2	−1	0	
9	Prime Bangkok	1	0	0	1	0	2	−2	0	
10	Chamchuri United	1	0	0	1	0	3	−3	0	
11	Ayutthaya PK	1	0	0	1	0	4	−4	0	
12	Lopburi Poma	1	0	0	1	2	7	−5	0	Relegation to the Thailand Semi-pro League

Updated to match(es) played on 20 September 2026. Source: Thai League
Rules for classification: 1) Points; 2) Overall goal difference; 3) Overall goals scored; 4) Head-to-head points; 5) Head-to-head goal difference; 6) Head-to-head goals scored; 7) Fair play points.

=== Western region ===
League table

Pos	Team	Pld	W	D	L	GF	GA	GD	Pts	Qualification or relegation
1	Samut Sakhon City	1	1	0	0	3	1	+2	3	Qualification to the National Championship stage
2	Thonburi United	1	1	0	0	3	2	+1	3	Qualification to the National Championship stage
3	Bangkok	1	1	0	0	2	1	+1	3	
4	Hua Hin City	1	0	1	0	0	0	0	1	
5	Royal Thai Army	1	0	1	0	0	0	0	1	
6	Samut Songkhram City	1	0	1	0	0	0	0	1	
7	Suphanburi	1	0	1	0	0	0	0	1	
8	Thap Luang United	1	0	1	0	0	0	0	1	
9	VRN Muangnont	1	0	1	0	0	0	0	1	
10	Assumption United	1	0	0	1	2	3	−1	0	
11	Phetchaburi PBRU	1	0	0	1	1	2	−1	0	
12	Rajpracha	1	0	0	1	1	3	−2	0	Relegation to the Thailand Semi-pro League

Updated to match(es) played on 20 September 2026. Source: Thai League
Rules for classification: 1) Points; 2) Overall goal difference; 3) Overall goals scored; 4) Head-to-head points; 5) Head-to-head goal difference; 6) Head-to-head goals scored; 7) Fair play points.

=== Southern region ===
League table

Pos	Team	Pld	W	D	L	GF	GA	GD	Pts	Qualification or relegation
1	Samui United	1	1	0	0	2	0	+2	3	Qualification to the National Championship stage
2	Yala City	1	1	0	0	2	1	+1	3	Qualification to the National Championship stage
3	Nakhon Si United	1	0	1	0	2	2	0	1	
4	Yala	1	0	1	0	2	2	0	1	
5	Muang Trang United	1	0	1	0	0	0	0	1	
6	Nara	1	0	1	0	0	0	0	1	
7	Phuket Andaman	1	0	1	0	0	0	0	1	
8	PSU Surat Thani City	1	0	1	0	0	0	0	1	
9	Chumphon United	1	0	0	1	1	2	−1	0	
10	Ranong PJ United	1	0	0	1	0	2	−2	0	Relegation to the Thailand Semi-pro League

Updated to match(es) played on 20 September 2026. Source: Thai League
Rules for classification: 1) Points; 2) Overall goal difference; 3) Overall goals scored; 4) Head-to-head points; 5) Head-to-head goal difference; 6) Head-to-head goals scored; 7) Fair play points.

== See also ==
- 2026–27 Thai League 1
- 2026–27 Thai League 2
- 2026–27 Thai League 3 Northern Region
- 2026–27 Thai League 3 Central Region
- 2026–27 Thai League 3 Northeastern Region
- 2026–27 Thai League 3 Eastern Region
- 2026–27 Thai League 3 Western Region
- 2026–27 Thai League 3 Southern Region
- 2026–27 Thai League 3 National Championship
- 2026–27 Thai League 3 Cup
- 2026–27 Thai FA Cup
- 2026–27 Thai League Cup
- 2026–27 Thai U21 League
