= Samuel (footballer, born August 1999) =

Brazilian footballer

Personal information
- Full name: Samuel Gomes da Mata
- Date of birth: 20 August 1999 (age 27)
- Place of birth: Urucuia, Brazil
- Height: 1.80 m (5 ft 11 in)
- Position: Forward

Team information
- Current team: Nakhon Ratchasima

Youth career
- Goiás

Senior career*
| Years | Team | Apps | (Gls) |
| 2018–2022 | Goiás | 7 | (0) |
| 2020–2021 | → Londrina (loan) | 14 | (1) |
| 2021 | → Aparecidense (loan) | 11 | (4) |
| 2022 | Cascavel | 15 | (2) |
| 2022–2023 | Gudja United | 18 | (3) |
| 2023–2025 | Sliema Wanderers | 33 | (7) |
| 2025 | Żabbar St. Patrick | 7 | (1) |
| 2026 | Sorriso-MT | 0 | (0) |
| 2026– | Nakhon Ratchasima | 0 | (0) |

International career
| 2017 | Brazil (University) | 4 | (1) |
- * Club domestic league appearances and goals as of 6 October 2025

Samuel Gomes da Mata (born 20 August 1999), commonly known as Samuel, is a Brazilian footballer who plays as a forward for Thai League 2 club Nakhon Ratchasima.

== Career statistics ==
=== Club ===
As of 19 July 2019.

| Club | Season | League | | | State League | | Cup | | Continental | | Other | | Total | |
| Club | Season | Division | Apps | Goals | Apps | Goals | Apps | Goals | Apps | Goals | Apps | Goals | Apps | Goals |
|---|---|---|---|---|---|---|---|---|---|---|---|---|---|---|
| Goiás | 2018 | Série B | 0 | 0 | 0 | 0 | 1 (Note: Appearances in the Copa do Brasil) | 0 | – | | 0 | 0 | 1 | 0 |
| Goiás | 2019 | Série A | 0 | 0 | 0 | 0 | 0 | 0 | – | | 0 | 0 | 0 | 0 |
| Career total | | | 0 | 0 | 0 | 0 | 1 | 0 | 0 | 0 | 0 | 0 | 1 | 0 |
