= Warawut Motim =

Thai footballer (born 1998)

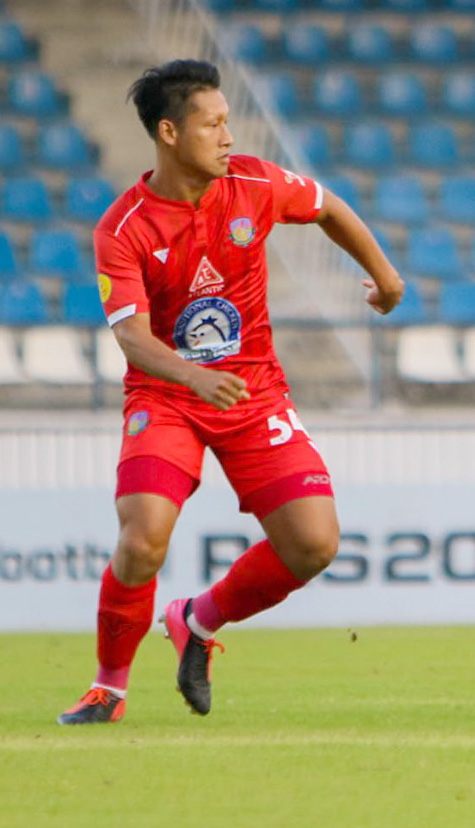
- Motim in 2021

Personal information
- Full name: Warawut Motim
- Date of birth: 8 May 1998 (age 28)
- Place of birth: Nakhon Sawan, Thailand
- Position: Midfielder

Team information
- Current team: Samui United

Senior career*
Years	Team	Apps	(Gls)
2018–2019	Chiangrai United	5	(0)
2019	Chiangrai City	2	(0)
2020–2021	Kasetsart	20	(1)
2021–2022	Songkhla	23	(0)
2023	Ayutthaya United	0	(0)
2023	→ North Bangkok University (loan)	14	(0)
2023−2024	Chanthaburi	28	(0)
2024−2025	Police Tero	27	(0)
2025	Bangkok	15	(0)
2025−2026	Police Tero	9	(0)
2026−	Samui United	0	(0)
- * Club domestic league appearances and goals as of 18 May 2026

Warawut Motim (Thai: วราวุฒิ โมทิม, born 8 May 1998) is a Thai professional footballer who plays as a midfielder.

== Honours ==
=== Club ===
North Bangkok University

- Thai League 3 Bangkok Metropolitan Region (1): 2022–23
