= Bangkapi F.C. =

Bangkapi บางกะปิ
- Full name: Bangkapi Football Club
- Nicknames: The Fighters of Thung Khwan Riam (นักสู้ทุ่งขวัญเรียม)
- Founded: 2010; 16 years ago
- Ground: Stadium of Ramkhamhaeng University; Bangkok, Thailand
- Capacity: 6,000
- Coordinates: 13°45′16″N 100°37′00″E
- Owner(s): Bang Kapi SC Co., Ltd.
- Chairman: Thitipat Chotidechachainan
- Head coach: Peerathorn Thattakittiya
- League: Thai League 3
- 2026: Thailand Semi-pro League, 2nd of 11 in the Central region
- Website: Facebook

Bangkapi Football Club (Thai: สโมสรฟุตบอล บางกะปิ), is a Thai professional football club based in Bangkok, Thailand. The club currently competes in the Thai League 3, the third tier of the Thai football league system, and plays in the Central region.

== History ==
Bangkapi Football Club was founded in 2010. The club competed in the Thailand Amateur League in the years before entering the Thailand Semi-pro League. In 2023, Bangkapi made its debut in the Thailand Semi-pro League, finishing third in the Bangkok Metropolitan Region. The club also developed youth teams, with its under-12 side winning the 24th Singha Junior Cup that year. The club did not participate in the competition in 2024. In 2025, Bangkapi returned to the fourth tier and competed in the Central Region, finishing in seventh and last place.

In 2026, Bangkapi finished as runners-up in the Central Region of the Thailand Semi-pro League and earned promotion to the Thai League 3. During the year, the club also played a friendly against Thai League 2 side Muangthong United, losing 3–1. Bangkapi subsequently entered the 2026–27 Thai League 3 season in the Central Region.

== Stadium and locations ==
Coordinates	Location	Stadium	Year
13°53′54″N 100°37′46″E	Sai Mai, Bangkok	Grakcu Sai Mai Stadium	2023
13°45′16″N 100°37′00″E	Bang Kapi, Bangkok	Stadium of Ramkhamhaeng University	2025 – present

== Season by season record ==
Season	League									FA Cup	League Cup	T3 Cup	Top goalscorer	
Season	Division	P	W	D	L	F	A	Pts	Pos	FA Cup	League Cup	T3 Cup	Name	Goals
2023	TS Bangkok	6	3	2	1	4	3	11	3rd	R1	Ineligible	Ineligible	(Thailand) Napat Kuttanan	2
2024	Did not participate									R1	Ineligible	Ineligible	—	—
2025	TS Central	6	0	1	5	1	10	1	7th	Opted out	Ineligible	Ineligible	(Thailand) Yutthakarn Kemsophawat	1
2026	TS Central	6	4	2	0	9	3	14	2nd	Opted out	Ineligible	Ineligible	(Thailand) Kanok Sangkasopha	2
2026–27	T3 Central										QR1			

Champions	Runners-up	Promoted	Relegated

- P = Played
- W = Games won
- D = Games drawn
- L = Games lost
- F = Goals for
- A = Goals against
- Pts = Points
- Pos = Final position
- QR1 = First Qualifying Round
- QR2 = Second Qualifying Round
- R1 = Round 1
- R2 = Round 2
- R3 = Round 3
- R4 = Round 4
- R5 = Round 5
- R6 = Round 6
- QF = Quarter-finals
- SF = Semi-finals
- RU = Runners-up
- W = Winners

== Players ==
=== Current squad ===
As of

Note: Flags indicate national team as defined under FIFA eligibility rules; some limited exceptions apply. Players may hold more than one non-FIFA nationality.

No. / Pos. / Nation / Player	No. / Pos. / Nation / Player
