= AJ Inia =

Australian soccer player

Ata "AJ" Inia
Personal information
- Full name: Ata Jesse Inia
- Date of birth: 25 April 2000 (age 26)
- Place of birth: Melbourne, Australia
- Height: 1.87 m (6 ft 1 1/2 in)
- Position: Winger

Team information
- Current team: Kasetsart
- Number: 7

Youth career
- 2015–2017: Werribee City

Senior career*
Years	Team	Apps	(Gls)
2018–2019	Melbourne Knights	27	(10)
2020	Caroline Springs George Cross	0	(0)
2020–2021	Angkor Tiger	19	(2)
2021–2022	Trang	4	(2)
2022	Caroline Springs George Cross	1	(1)
2023	Navy	8	(4)
2023	Chainat Hornbill	16	(2)
2024	Phrae United	13	(0)
2024	Chanthaburi	16	(2)
2025–2026	Sisaket United	28	(4)
2025–	Kasetsart	0	(0)
- * Club domestic league appearances and goals as of 26 April 2025 (UTC) ‡ National team caps and goals as of 22 December 2021

Ata Jesse "AJ" Inia (born 25 April 2000) is an Australian professional soccer player who currently plays for Kasetsart of the Thai League 2.

== Club career ==
Inia played for the Melbourne Knights of Australia's NPL Victoria from 2018. He competed with the team in the 2019 FFA Cup, including a Round of 32 match against Adelaide United of the A-League. In 2019, Star Weekly noted that "a delicious cross" by Inia resulting in a goal "provided a glimpse into Inia's bright future".

Inia signed with Angkor Tiger of the Cambodian Premier League at the end of 2020 after having tested with the club. Angkor Tiger staff described him as “lightning fast Tongan winger”. The contract made him Tonga's first-ever professional footballer. In June 2021, Khmer Times reported that "Tongan standout Inia" was part of the club's "talented lineup". The publication also reported that Inia was also the first player of Tongan descent to play in the Kingdom of Cambodia. On July 12, 2021, Inia scored his first goal in Cambodia, playing in the position of striker, as Angkor Tiger recorded its sixth straight win in the MCL. Inia equalized in a match against Boeung Ket Angkor FC on November 13, 2021, which ended 1–1.

In December 2021, Inia decided to move his talents to the Thai League, joining Trang FC of the Thai League 3 in a direct transfer from the Angkor Tiger. In late February 2022 he re-joined Caroline Springs George Cross FC of the Victorian State League 1. That season he scored one goal in the league.

In 2023 he returned to Thailand for a short stint with Navy before joining Chainat Hornbill of the Thai League 2.

== International career ==
Born in Melbourne, Australia, Inia was a candidate for the Australia under-23 team for the 2020 AFC U-23 Championship after representing them in U-18 level, but withdrew due to a change of heart. He later expressed keen interest in representing the homeland of his father and grandparents, stating he would like to play with Tonga at senior level.

Inia has not yet featured for any Tongan national side.
