= Patrick Marcelino =

Brazilian footballer

Personal information
- Full name: Patrick Marcelino
- Date of birth: 4 March 1994 (age 32)
- Place of birth: Osasco, Brazil
- Height: 1.90 m (6 ft 3 in)
- Positions: Center-back; right back

Team information
- Current team: Kanchanaburi Power

Youth career
- 2011: Mirassol

Senior career*
Years	Team	Apps	(Gls)
2012	Tanabi		
2012–2020	Ferroviária	32	(0)
2015	→ Boa Esporte (loan)	13	(0)
2016	→ Kashiwa Reysol (loan)	0	(0)
2017	→ Penafiel (loan)	0	(0)
2018	→ Oeste (loan)	23	(1)
2019	→ Fortaleza (loan)	4	(0)
2019	→ Vila Nova (loan)	12	(1)
2020–2021	Mirassol-SP	14	(2)
2021	São Bernardo-SP	18	(3)
2022	Concórdia-SC	5	(0)
2022	Marcílio Dias	0	(0)
2022	Lemense Futebol Clube	0	(0)
2022–2023	Associacao Atletica Caldense	10	(3)
2023	Londrina Esporte Clube	16	(0)
2023–2025	Zakho	36	(2)
2025–2026	Ninh Binh	21	(0)
2026–	Kanchanaburi Power	0	(0)
- * Club domestic league appearances and goals as of 7 June 2026

Patrick Marcelino (born 4 March 1994) is a Brazilian professional footballer who plays as a center-back or right back for Thai League 2 club Kanchanaburi Power.

Marcelino previously played for clubs in Brazil, Japan, Portugal and Iraq.

== Career statistics ==
As of 20 February 2017

Club	Season	League			State League		Cup		Continental		Other		Total	
Club	Season	Division	Apps	Goals	Apps	Goals	Apps	Goals	Apps	Goals	Apps	Goals	Apps	Goals
Ferroviária	2014	Paulista A2	—		1	0	—		—		10 (Note: All appearance(s) in Copa Paulista)	1	11	1
Ferroviária	2015	Paulista A2	—		6	0	—		—		—		6	0
Ferroviária	2016	Paulista	—		—		—		—		12	1	12	1
Ferroviária	2017	Paulista	—		2	0	1	0	—		—		3	0
Ferroviária	Subtotal		—		9	0	1	0	—		22	2	32	2
Boa Esporte	2015	Série B	13	0	—		—		—		—		13	0
Career total			13	0	9	0	1	0	0	0	22	2	45	2
