= Bukkoree Lemdee =

Thai footballer (born 2004)

Personal information
- Full name: Bukkoree Lemdee
- Date of birth: 11 March 2004 (age 22)
- Place of birth: Songkhla, Thailand
- Height: 1.80 m (5 ft 11 in)
- Positions: Right back; center back

Team information
- Current team: Songkhla (on loan from Chonburi)
- Number: 14

Youth career
- 2017–2020: Chonburi

Senior career*
Years	Team	Apps	(Gls)
2020–	Chonburi	21	(0)
2020	→ Banbueng (loan)	4	(0)
2023	→ Customs United (loan)	15	(0)
2024–2025	→ Chiangmai United (loan)	22	(0)
2025	→ Nakhon Ratchasima (loan)	13	(1)
2025–	→ Songkhla (loan)	0	(0)

International career^{‡}
2022	Thailand U20	3	(0)
2022–	Thailand U23	1	(0)
- * Club domestic league appearances and goals as of 09:09, 17 December 2025 (UTC) ‡ National team caps and goals as of 18 September 2022

Bukkoree Lemdee (Thai: บุคฆอรี เหล็มดี, born 11 March 2004) is a Thai professional footballer who plays as a right back or a center back for Thai League 1 club Songkhla on loan from Chonburi.

== Career ==
Bukkoree learned to play football in the youth team of Chonburi. It was here that he signed his first professional contract in 2021. The club from Chonburi played in the country's first division, the Thai League. He made his professional debut on March 14, 2021 in the away game at Port. Here he was in the starting line-up. In the 61st minute he was replaced because of an injury against Channarong Promsrikaew.

== Honours ==
=== International ===
Thailand U23

- SEA Games (silver) Silver medal: 2023
