= 2026–27 Thai League 3 Eastern Region =

Thai League 3 Eastern Region
- Season: 2026–27
- Dates: 19 September 2026 – 21 March 2027

The 2026–27 Thai League 3 Eastern Region was part of the 2026–27 Thai League 3 Regional Stage, consisting of 11 clubs located in the eastern region of Thailand, as well as some from the eastern part of the central region. The season commenced on 19 September 2026, with clubs competing in a round-robin format featuring home-and-away matches. The Regional Stage concluded on 21 March 2027, with the top two clubs advancing to the National Championship Stage, while the bottom-placed club was relegated to the Thailand Semi-pro League for the following season.

== Seasonal Changes ==
The 2026–27 Thai League 3 Eastern Region has been reduced to 11 clubs, down from 12 last season. BYD Auto remains the title sponsor, with matches broadcast on AIS Play. The criteria for determining the standings have also been revised, with overall goal difference replacing head-to-head results as the primary tiebreaker.

=== Promotions from Thailand Semi-pro League ===
The following two clubs were promoted from the 2026 Thailand Semi-pro League to the 2026–27 Thai League 3 Eastern Region:

- MNK – promoted as regional champions.
- Banbueng – promoted as runners-up under a special quota.

=== Relegation to Thailand Semi-pro League ===
The following three clubs were relegated from the 2025–26 Thai League 3 Eastern Region to the 2027 Thailand Semi-pro League:

- Bankhai United, who finished fifth in the Eastern Region, failed to obtain a Thai League 3 club licence and was relegated to the Thailand Semi-pro League.
- Saimit Kabin United, who finished sixth in the Eastern Region, failed to obtain a Thai League 3 club licence and was relegated to the Thailand Semi-pro League.
- ACDC was relegated to the 2027 Thailand Semi-pro League after finishing bottom of the 2025–26 Thai League 3 Eastern Region.

== Teams ==
=== Number of teams by province ===
| Position | Province | Number | Teams |
|---|---|---|---|
| 1 | Chonburi | 7 | Banbueng, BFB Pattaya City, Burapha United, Fleet, Marines, MNK, and Navy |
| 2 | Chachoengsao | 2 | Chachoengsao Hi-Tek and Padriew City |
| 3 | Rayong | 1 | Pluakdaeng United |
| 3 | Samut Prakan | 1 | Customs United |

=== Stadiums and locations ===
| Team | Location | Stadium | Coordinates |
|---|---|---|---|
| Banbueng | Chonburi (Ban Bueng) | Chang Football Park | 13°18′09″N 101°12′25″E |
| BFB Pattaya City | Chonburi (Bang Lamung) | Nong Prue Stadium | 12°55′28″N 100°56′14″E |
| Burapha United | Chonburi (Ban Bueng) | Banbueng Municipal Stadium | 13°19′06″N 101°06′59″E |
| Chachoengsao Hi-Tek | Chachoengsao (Mueang) | Chachoengsao Municipal Stadium | 13°41′24″N 101°04′06″E |
| Customs United | Samut Prakan (Bang Phli) | Stadium of Customs Department, Lad Krabang 54 | 13°42′22″N 100°47′03″E |
| Fleet | Chonburi (Sattahip) | Battleship Stadium | 12°39′38″N 100°55′25″E |
| Marines | Chonburi (Sattahip) | Battleship Stadium | 12°39′38″N 100°55′25″E |
| MNK | Chonburi (Si Racha) | Stadium of Rajamangala University of Technology Tawan-ok | 13°13′39″N 100°57′29″E |
| Navy | Chonburi (Sattahip) | Sattahip Navy Stadium | 12°39′49″N 100°56′09″E |
| Padriew City | Chachoengsao (Mueang) | Chachoengsao Municipal Stadium | 13°41′24″N 101°04′06″E |
| Pluakdaeng United | Rayong (Pluak Daeng) | CK Stadium | 12°59′06″N 101°12′52″E |

=== Foreign players ===
A T3 team can register 3 foreign players from around the world. A team can field 3 foreign players in each game.

== League table ==
=== Standings ===
| Pos | Team | Pld | W | D | L | GF | GA | GD | Pts | Qualification or relegation |
|---|---|---|---|---|---|---|---|---|---|---|
| 1 | Burapha United | 8 | 7 | 0 | 1 | 35 | 8 | +27 | 21 | Qualification to the National Championship stage |
| 2 | Navy | 8 | 6 | 0 | 2 | 18 | 6 | +12 | 18 | Qualification to the National Championship stage |
| 3 | BFB Pattaya City | 8 | 5 | 1 | 2 | 16 | 16 | 0 | 16 | |
| 4 | Pluakdaeng United | 8 | 5 | 0 | 3 | 18 | 15 | +3 | 15 | |
| 5 | Padriew City | 8 | 4 | 2 | 2 | 18 | 13 | +5 | 14 | |
| 6 | Chachoengsao Hi-Tek | 8 | 4 | 1 | 3 | 19 | 13 | +6 | 13 | |
| 7 | Fleet | 8 | 3 | 1 | 4 | 13 | 11 | +2 | 10 | |
| 8 | Marines | 8 | 3 | 1 | 4 | 14 | 15 | −1 | 10 | |
| 9 | Customs United | 8 | 3 | 0 | 5 | 13 | 18 | −5 | 9 | |
| 10 | Banbueng | 9 | 2 | 0 | 7 | 12 | 27 | −15 | 6 | |
| 11 | MNK | 9 | 0 | 0 | 9 | 3 | 37 | −34 | 0 | Relegation to the Thailand Semi-pro League |

Updated to match(es) played on 19 November 2026. Source: Thai League
Rules for classification: 1) Points; 2) Overall goal difference; 3) Overall goals scored; 4) Head-to-head points; 5) Head-to-head goal difference; 6) Head-to-head goals scored; 7) Fair play points.

=== Positions by round ===
| Team ╲ Round | 1 | 2 | 3 | 4 | 5 | 6 | 7 | 8 | 9 | 10 | 11 | 12 | 13 | 14 | 15 | 16 | 17 | 18 | 19 | 20 | 21 | 22 |
|---|---|---|---|---|---|---|---|---|---|---|---|---|---|---|---|---|---|---|---|---|---|---|
| Burapha United | 2 | 1 | 1 | 1 | 1 | 1 | 2 | 1 | 1 | | | | | | | | | | | | | |
| Navy | 9 | 9 | 9 | 5 | 3 | 2 | 3 | 3 | 2 | | | | | | | | | | | | | |
| BFB Pattaya City | 3 | 2 | 2 | 3 | 2 | 6 | 1 | 2 | 3 | | | | | | | | | | | | | |
| Pluakdaeng United | 6 | 5 | 5 | 9 | 7 | 7 | 7 | 6 | 4 | | | | | | | | | | | | | |
| Padriew City | 11 | 4 | 4 | 2 | 4 | 3 | 4 | 4 | 5 | | | | | | | | | | | | | |
| Chachoengsao Hi-Tek | 8 | 7 | 3 | 6 | 6 | 5 | 6 | 5 | 6 | | | | | | | | | | | | | |
| Fleet | 4 | 8 | 10 | 4 | 5 | 4 | 5 | 7 | 7 | | | | | | | | | | | | | |
| Marines | 5 | 6 | 8 | 8 | 9 | 9 | 8 | 8 | 8 | | | | | | | | | | | | | |
| Customs United | 1 | 3 | 6 | 7 | 8 | 8 | 9 | 9 | 9 | | | | | | | | | | | | | |
| Banbueng | 7 | 10 | 7 | 10 | 10 | 10 | 10 | 10 | 10 | | | | | | | | | | | | | |
| MNK | 10 | 11 | 11 | 11 | 11 | 11 | 11 | 11 | 11 | | | | | | | | | | | | | |

Source: Thai League
= Qualification to the National Championship stage; = Relegation to the Thailand Semi-pro League

=== Results by round ===
| Team ╲ Round | 1 | 2 | 3 | 4 | 5 | 6 | 7 | 8 | 9 | 10 | 11 | 12 | 13 | 14 | 15 | 16 | 17 | 18 | 19 | 20 | 21 | 22 |
|---|---|---|---|---|---|---|---|---|---|---|---|---|---|---|---|---|---|---|---|---|---|---|
| Burapha United | W | W | W | W | N | L | W | W | W | | | | | | | | | | | | | |
| Navy | L | L | W | W | W | W | N | W | W | | | | | | | | | | | | | |
| BFB Pattaya City | W | W | D | L | W | W | W | N | L | | | | | | | | | | | | | |
| Pluakdaeng United | N | W | L | L | W | W | L | W | W | | | | | | | | | | | | | |
| Padriew City | L | W | D | W | D | W | L | W | N | | | | | | | | | | | | | |
| Chachoengsao Hi-Tek | L | W | W | N | D | W | L | W | L | | | | | | | | | | | | | |
| Fleet | W | L | N | W | D | W | L | L | L | | | | | | | | | | | | | |
| Marines | W | L | L | L | D | N | W | L | W | | | | | | | | | | | | | |
| Customs United | W | N | L | W | L | L | L | L | W | | | | | | | | | | | | | |
| Banbueng | L | L | W | L | L | L | W | L | L | | | | | | | | | | | | | |
| MNK | L | L | L | L | L | L | L | L | L | | | | | | | | | | | | | |

Source: Thai League
N = No match; W = Won; D = Drawn; L = Lost

=== Results ===
| Home \ Away | BBG | BPC | BPU | CCH | CTU | FLT | MRE | MNK | NVY | PRC | PDU |
|---|---|---|---|---|---|---|---|---|---|---|---|
| Banbueng | — | | | | 3–0 | | 1–2 | 3–1 | | | 2–4 |
| BFB Pattaya City | 2–0 | — | 0–4 | | | 1–0 | | | 2–1 | | |
| Burapha United | 5–2 | | — | | 7–2 | | | 8–1 | 0–1 | | |
| Chachoengsao Hi-Tek | | | 2–4 | — | | | | 7–0 | 1–0 | 1–1 | 2–3 |
| Customs United | | | | 2–3 | — | 1–0 | 2–1 | | | | 0–1 |
| Fleet | 7–1 | | 0–3 | 2–1 | | — | | 1–0 | | 1–2 | |
| Marines | | 5–2 | | 1–2 | | 2–2 | — | | | 2–0 | |
| MNK | | 0–1 | | | 1–5 | | | — | 0–4 | 0–5 | 0–3 |
| Navy | 3–0 | | | | 2–1 | | 4–0 | | — | | 3–2 |
| Padriew City | 3–0 | 4–4 | 0–4 | | | | | | | — | |
| Pluakdaeng United | | 2–4 | | | | | 2–1 | | | 1–3 | — |

Updated to match(es) played on 19 November 2026. Source: Thai League
Legend: Blue = home team win; Yellow = draw; Red = away team win.
For upcoming matches, an "a" indicates there is an article about the rivalry between the two participants.
