= 2026–27 Thai League 3 Western Region =

Thai League 3 Western Region
- Season: 2026–27
- Dates: 19 September 2026 – 21 March 2027

The 2026–27 Thai League 3 Western Region was part of the 2026–27 Thai League 3 Regional Stage, consisting of 12 clubs located in the western region of Thailand, along with some from the western part of the central region. The season commenced on 19 September 2026, with clubs competing in a round-robin format featuring home-and-away matches. The Regional Stage concluded on 21 March 2027, with the top two clubs advancing to the National Championship Stage, while the bottom-placed club was relegated to the Thailand Semi-pro League for the following season.

== Seasonal Changes ==
The 2026–27 Thai League 3 Western Region has been expanded to 12 clubs, up from 11 last season. BYD Auto remains the title sponsor, with matches broadcast on AIS Play. The criteria for determining the standings have also been revised, with overall goal difference replacing head-to-head results as the primary tiebreaker.

=== Relegation from Thai League 2 ===
Bangkok was relegated to the 2026–27 Thai League 3 Western Region after finishing bottom of the 2025–26 Thai League 2.

=== Promotions from Thailand Semi-pro League ===
Phetchaburi, later renamed Phetchaburi PBRU, was promoted from the 2026 Thailand Semi-pro League to the 2026–27 Thai League 3 Western Region as regional champions.

=== Relegation to Thailand Semi-pro League ===
Nonthaburi United was relegated to the 2027 Thailand Semi-pro League after finishing bottom of the 2025–26 Thai League 3 Western Region.

=== Club name and logo changes ===
Phetchaburi, newly promoted from the Thailand Semi-pro League, was renamed Phetchaburi PBRU, with "PBRU" added to the club logo to reflect the new name.

== Teams ==
=== Number of teams by province ===
Position	Province	Number	Teams
1	Bangkok	4	Assumption United, Bangkok, Royal Thai Army, and Thonburi United
2	Nonthaburi	2	Rajpracha and VRN Muangnont
3	Nakhon Pathom	1	Thap Luang United
3	Phetchaburi	1	Phetchaburi PBRU
3	Prachuap Khiri Khan	1	Hua Hin City
3	Samut Sakhon	1	Samut Sakhon City
3	Samut Songkhram	1	Samut Songkhram City
3	Suphanburi	1	Suphanburi

=== Stadiums and locations ===
Team	Location	Stadium	Coordinates
Assumption United	Bangkok (Bang Khae)	Wong Prachanukul Stadium	13°44′03″N 100°22′14″E
Bangkok	Bangkok (Thung Khru)	72nd Anniversary Stadium, Bang Mot	13°38′49″N 100°29′34″E
Hua Hin City	Prachuap Khiri Khan (Hua Hin)	Hua Hin Municipal Stadium	12°31′37″N 99°58′10″E
Phetchaburi PBRU	Phetchaburi (Mueang)	Stadium of Phetchaburi Rajabhat University	13°04′20″N 99°58′45″E
Rajpracha	Nonthaburi (Bang Yai)	Nonthaburi Stadium	13°51′03″N 100°26′28″E
Royal Thai Army	Bangkok (Thawi Watthana)	Stadium of Bangkokthonburi University	13°46′09″N 100°20′44″E
Samut Sakhon City	Samut Sakhon (Mueang)	Stadium of Thailand National Sports University, Samut Sakhon Campus	13°32′30″N 100°16′52″E
Samut Songkhram City	Samut Songkhram (Mueang)	Samut Songkhram Stadium	13°24′51″N 100°00′00″E
Suphanburi	Suphanburi (Mueang)	Suphanburi Provincial Stadium	14°28′27″N 100°05′12″E
Thap Luang United	Nakhon Pathom (Mueang)	Thap Luang United Janded Stadium	13°52′23″N 100°01′37″E
Thonburi United	Bangkok (Nong Khaem)	Thonburi Stadium	13°43′28″N 100°20′43″E
VRN Muangnont	Nonthaburi (Mueang)	Nonthaburi Municipal Stadium	13°52′44″N 100°32′39″E

=== Foreign players ===
A T3 team can register 3 foreign players from around the world. A team can field 3 foreign players in each game.

== League table ==
=== Standings ===
Pos	Team	Pld	W	D	L	GF	GA	GD	Pts	Qualification or relegation
1	Samut Sakhon City	8	6	1	1	19	10	+9	19	Qualification to the National Championship stage
2	Bangkok	8	5	2	1	15	9	+6	17	Qualification to the National Championship stage
3	Assumption United	9	5	2	2	15	11	+4	17	
4	Suphanburi	9	3	4	2	16	14	+2	13	
5	Thap Luang United	9	3	3	3	12	10	+2	12	
6	Thonburi United	9	3	3	3	14	13	+1	12	
7	Hua Hin City	9	3	3	3	10	10	0	12	
8	Royal Thai Army	9	2	4	3	8	9	−1	10	
9	VRN Muangnont	9	1	6	2	11	15	−4	9	
10	Phetchaburi PBRU	9	2	3	4	8	12	−4	9	
11	Samut Songkhram City	9	1	4	4	10	12	−2	7	
12	Rajpracha	9	0	3	6	9	22	−13	3	Relegation to the Thailand Semi-pro League

Updated to match(es) played on 19 November 2026. Source: Thai League
Rules for classification: 1) Points; 2) Overall goal difference; 3) Overall goals scored; 4) Head-to-head points; 5) Head-to-head goal difference; 6) Head-to-head goals scored; 7) Fair play points.

=== Positions by round ===
Team ╲ Round	1	2	3	4	5	6	7	8	9	10	11	12	13	14	15	16	17	18	19	20	21	22
Samut Sakhon City	1	1	1	1	2	1	1	1	1													
Bangkok	3	3	6	3	1	2	2	2	2													
Assumption United	10	5	2	5	3	4	4	3	3													
Suphanburi	7	6	4	2	4	5	6	7	4													
Thap Luang United	8	9	3	8	10	10	7	4	5													
Thonburi United	2	2	5	7	9	6	3	5	6													
Hua Hin City	4	10	8	10	5	3	5	6	7													
Royal Thai Army	5	4	7	9	6	7	8	8	8													
VRN Muangnont	9	7	9	4	7	9	10	9	9													
Phetchaburi PBRU	11	11	11	11	11	11	11	10	10													
Samut Songkhram City	6	8	10	6	8	8	9	11	11													
Rajpracha	12	12	12	12	12	12	12	12	12													

Source: Thai League
= Qualification to the National Championship stage; = Relegation to the Thailand Semi-pro League

=== Results by round ===
Team ╲ Round	1	2	3	4	5	6	7	8	9	10	11	12	13	14	15	16	17	18	19	20	21	22
Samut Sakhon City	W	W	L	W	D	W	W	W														
Bangkok	W	D	L	W	W	W	D	W														
Assumption United	L	W	W	L	W	D	D	W	W													
Suphanburi	D	D	W	W	D	L	D	L	W													
Thap Luang United	D	D	W	L	L	D	W	W	L													
Thonburi United	W	D	D	L	L	W	W	L	D													
Hua Hin City	D	L	W	D	W	W	L	L	D													
Royal Thai Army	D	W	L	D	W	L	D	L	D													
VRN Muangnont	D	D	D	W	D	L	L	D	D													
Phetchaburi PBRU	L	L	D	L	L	D	W	W	D													
Samut Songkhram City	D	D	L	W	D	D	L	L	L													
Rajpracha	L	L	D	L	L	L	L	D	D													

Source: Thai League
W = Won; D = Drawn; L = Lost

=== Results ===
Home \ Away	ASU	BKK	HHC	PBR	RCA	ARM	SKN	SKM	SPB	TLU	TBU	VMN
Assumption United	—					1–0		2–1	2–1	0–0		
Bangkok	2–2	—			3–0			2–1		0–0		
Hua Hin City		4–3	—	3–0								1–1
Phetchaburi PBRU	1–2	1–2		—				1–1	1–2		1–0	
Rajpracha	1–3		0–1	1–1	—						2–2	3–3
Royal Thai Army		1–2	0–0	1–1	1–0	—	2–3					
Samut Sakhon City			2–0		3–1		—				3–2	4–0
Samut Songkhram City						0–0	1–2	—		3–1	1–1	1–1
Suphanburi			0–0			1–1	2–2	2–1	—			
Thap Luang United			2–0		5–1	1–2	2–0		1–4	—		
Thonburi United	3–2	0–1	2–1						3–1		—	1–1
VRN Muangnont	2–1			0–1					3–3	0–0		—

Updated to match(es) played on 19 November 2026. Source: Thai League
Legend: Blue = home team win; Yellow = draw; Red = away team win.
For upcoming matches, an "a" indicates there is an article about the rivalry between the two participants.
