= Ayutthaya PK F.C. =

Ayutthaya PK อยุธยา พีเค
- Full name: Ayutthaya PK Football Club
- Nicknames: The Old Capital Lions (ราชสีห์กรุงเก่า)
- Founded: 2024; 2 years ago
- Ground: Stadium of Rajamangala University of Technology Suvarnabhumi, Huntra Campus; Phra Nakhon Si Ayutthaya, Thailand
- Capacity: 1,000
- Coordinates: 14°22′35″N 100°36′23″E
- Owner(s): Ayutthaya PK FC Co., Ltd.
- Chairman: Marut Plaikaew
- Head coach: Peeratat Phoruendee
- League: Thai League 3
- 2026: Thailand Semi-pro League, runners-up
- Website: Facebook

Ayutthaya PK Football Club (Thai: สโมสรฟุตบอล อยุธยา พีเค), is a Thai professional football club based in Phra Nakhon Si Ayutthaya, Thailand. The club currently competes in the Thai League 3, the third tier of the Thai football league system, and plays in the Central region.

== History ==
Ayutthaya PK Football Club traces its origins to 2024. In March 2025, Marut Plaikaew, the club's president, was among 22 new members approved by the Football Association of Thailand. The club made its competitive debut in the 2025 Thailand Semi-pro League, finishing second in the Central region with 11 points. The club also made its debut in the Thai FA Cup in the 2025–26 season, losing 0–1 to Nonthaburi United in the qualifying round.

In 2026, Ayutthaya PK won the Central region of the 2026 Thailand Semi-pro League and reached the national championship final, where it finished as runner-up after losing 1–3 on aggregate to MNK S.C. The result secured the club's promotion to the Thai League 3 for the 2026–27 season. Ayutthaya PK also entered the Thai FA Cup for the second consecutive season.

== Stadium and locations ==
Coordinates	Location	Stadium	Year
14°22′35″N 100°36′23″E	Phra Nakhon Si Ayutthaya, Phra Nakhon Si Ayutthaya	Stadium of Rajamangala University of Technology Suvarnabhumi, Huntra Campus	2025 – present

== Season by season record ==
Season	League									FA Cup	League Cup	T3 Cup	Top goalscorer	
Season	Division	P	W	D	L	F	A	Pts	Pos	FA Cup	League Cup	T3 Cup	Name	Goals
2025	TS Central	6	3	2	1	9	6	11	2nd	Opted out	Ineligible	Ineligible	(Thailand) Athagorn Loungklang, (Thailand) Kittinat Nuamnimanong, (Thailand) Krittamaeth Khwanyou, (Thailand) Nares Ritphitakwong, (Thailand) Patchara Seangkral, (Thailand) Peemaphon Pharkphin, (Thailand) Phuwanart Khamkaew, (Thailand) Siriwat Bumee, (Thailand) Woramate Soonamporn	1
2026	TS Central	6	6	0	0	15	4	18	1st	QR	Ineligible	Ineligible	(Thailand) Weerakorn Janyalikit	4
2026–27	T3 Central													

Champions	Runners-up	Promoted	Relegated

- P = Played
- W = Games won
- D = Games drawn
- L = Games lost
- F = Goals for
- A = Goals against
- Pts = Points
- Pos = Final position
- QR1 = First Qualifying Round
- QR2 = Second Qualifying Round
- R1 = Round 1
- R2 = Round 2
- R3 = Round 3
- R4 = Round 4
- R5 = Round 5
- R6 = Round 6
- QF = Quarter-finals
- SF = Semi-finals
- RU = Runners-up
- W = Winners

== Players ==
=== Current squad ===
As of

Note: Flags indicate national team as defined under FIFA eligibility rules; some limited exceptions apply. Players may hold more than one non-FIFA nationality.

No. / Pos. / Nation / Player	No. / Pos. / Nation / Player
