= 2026–27 Thai League 3 Central Region =

Thai League 3 Central Region
- Season: 2026–27
- Dates: 19 September 2026 – 20 March 2027

The 2026–27 Thai League 3 Central Region was part of the 2026–27 Thai League 3 Regional Stage, consisting of 12 clubs located in the central region of Thailand. The season commenced on 19 September 2026, with clubs competing in a round-robin format featuring home-and-away matches. The Regional Stage concluded on 20 March 2027, with the top two clubs advancing to the National Championship Stage, while the bottom-placed club was relegated to the Thailand Semi-pro League for the following season.

== Seasonal Changes ==
The 2026–27 Thai League 3 Central Region has been expanded to 12 clubs, up from 11 last season. BYD Auto remains the title sponsor, with matches broadcast on AIS Play. The criteria for determining the standings have also been revised, with overall goal difference replacing head-to-head results as the primary tiebreaker.

=== Promotions from Thailand Semi-pro League ===
The following two clubs were promoted from the 2026 Thailand Semi-pro League to the 2026–27 Thai League 3 Central Region:

- Ayutthaya PK – promoted as regional champions.
- Bangkapi – promoted as runners-up under a special quota.

=== Relegation to Thailand Semi-pro League ===
Saraburi United was relegated to the 2027 Thailand Semi-pro League after finishing bottom of the 2025–26 Thai League 3 Central Region.

=== Club name and logo changes ===
Lopburi City was renamed Lopburi Poma, with the word "CITY" on the club logo replaced by "POMA FC".

== Teams ==
=== Number of teams by province ===
Position	Province	Number	Teams
1	Bangkok	4	Bangkapi, Chamchuri United, Kasem Bundit University, and Prime Bangkok
2	Pathum Thani	3	Futera United, North Bangkok University, and Royal Thai Air Force
3	Phra Nakhon Si Ayutthaya	2	Ayutthaya PK and PTU Pathum Thani
4	Ang Thong	1	Angthong
4	Lopburi	1	Lopburi Poma
4	Singburi	1	Singburi Warriors

=== Stadiums and locations ===
Team	Location	Stadium	Coordinates
Angthong	Angthong (Mueang)	Angthong Provincial Stadium	14°37′45″N 100°27′07″E
Ayutthaya PK	Phra Nakhon Si Ayutthaya (Phra Nakhon Si Ayutthaya)	Stadium of Rajamangala University of Technology Suvarnabhumi, Huntra Campus	14°22′35″N 100°36′23″E
Bangkapi	Bangkok (Bang Kapi)	Stadium of Ramkhamhaeng University	13°45′16″N 100°37′00″E
Chamchuri United	Bangkok (Pathum Wan)	Thephasadin Stadium	13°44′44″N 100°31′39″E
Futera United	Pathum Thani (Khlong Luang)	Stadium of Bangkok University	14°02′19″N 100°36′08″E
Kasem Bundit University	Bangkok (Min Buri)	Stadium of Kasem Bundit University	13°48′06″N 100°44′06″E
Lopburi Poma	Lopburi (Mueang)	Phra Ramesuan Stadium	14°48′04″N 100°38′52″E
North Bangkok University	Pathum Thani (Thanyaburi)	Stadium of North Bangkok University	14°00′22″N 100°40′24″E
Prime Bangkok	Bangkok (Lak Si)	Boonyachinda Stadium	13°52′02″N 100°34′41″E
PTU Pathum Thani	Ayutthaya (Bang Sai)	Ratchakram Stadium	14°10′09″N 100°31′45″E
Royal Thai Air Force	Pathum Thani (Lam Luk Ka)	Dhupatemiya Stadium	13°57′04″N 100°37′30″E
Singburi Warriors	Singburi (Mueang)	Singburi PAO Stadium	14°53′40″N 100°24′39″E

=== Foreign players ===
A T3 team can register 3 foreign players from around the world. A team can field 3 foreign players in each game.

== League table ==
=== Standings ===
Pos	Team	Pld	W	D	L	GF	GA	GD	Pts	Qualification or relegation
1	North Bangkok University	9	6	3	0	21	2	+19	21	Qualification to the National Championship stage
2	Angthong	9	6	3	0	23	11	+12	21	Qualification to the National Championship stage
3	Royal Thai Air Force	8	5	2	1	23	11	+12	17	
4	Chamchuri United	8	5	1	2	12	7	+5	16	
5	Prime Bangkok	9	5	0	4	20	11	+9	15	
6	Kasem Bundit University	9	3	4	2	14	11	+3	13	
7	PTU Pathum Thani	8	3	3	2	8	9	−1	12	
8	Futera United	8	3	1	4	14	15	−1	10	
9	Ayutthaya PK	8	3	1	4	11	16	−5	10	
10	Singburi Warriors	9	1	2	6	8	23	−15	5	
11	Bangkapi	8	0	2	6	6	19	−13	2	
12	Lopburi Poma	9	0	0	9	7	32	−25	0	Relegation to the Thailand Semi-pro League

Updated to match(es) played on 19 November 2026. Source: Thai League
Rules for classification: 1) Points; 2) Overall goal difference; 3) Overall goals scored; 4) Head-to-head points; 5) Head-to-head goal difference; 6) Head-to-head goals scored; 7) Fair play points.

=== Positions by round ===
Team ╲ Round	1	2	3	4	5	6	7	8	9	10	11	12	13	14	15	16	17	18	19	20	21	22
North Bangkok University	2	1	1	1	1	1	1	1	1													
Angthong	3	2	2	2	2	2	2	2	2													
Royal Thai Air Force	1	4	6	8	8	8	5	4	3													
Chamchuri United	10	10	8	6	4	4	3	3	4													
Prime Bangkok	9	6	7	4	7	6	4	5	5													
Kasem Bundit University	4	3	3	3	3	5	7	7	6													
PTU Pathum Thani	6	7	5	7	5	3	6	6	7													
Futera United	5	5	4	5	6	7	8	8	8													
Ayutthaya PK	11	11	11	11	11	11	9	9	9													
Singburi Warriors	7	8	9	9	9	9	10	10	10													
Bangkapi	8	9	10	10	10	10	11	11	11													
Lopburi Poma	12	12	12	12	12	12	12	12	12													

Source: Thai League
= Qualification to the National Championship stage; = Relegation to the Thailand Semi-pro League

=== Results by round ===
Team ╲ Round	1	2	3	4	5	6	7	8	9	10	11	12	13	14	15	16	17	18	19	20	21	22
North Bangkok University	W	W	W	D	W	D	W	D	W													
Angthong	W	D	W	D	W	W	W	D	W													
Royal Thai Air Force	W	L	D	D	W	W	W	W														
Chamchuri United	L	W	W	W	D	W	W	L														
Prime Bangkok	L	W	L	W	L	W	W	L	W													
Kasem Bundit University	W	D	W	D	D	L	L	D	W													
PTU Pathum Thani	D	W	D	W	W	L	D	L														
Futera United	W	W	L	L	W	L	D	L														
Ayutthaya PK	L	L	L	D	L	W	W	W														
Singburi Warriors	D	L	L	W	L	L	L	D	L													
Bangkapi	L	L	D	D	L	L	L	L														
Lopburi Poma	L	L	L	L	L	L	L	L	L													

Source: Thai League
W = Won; D = Drawn; L = Lost

=== Results ===
Home \ Away	ATG	AYP	BKP	CCU	FTU	KBU	LBP	NBU	PBK	PTU	AIR	SBW
Angthong	—	3–0	4–2	3–0								2–1
Ayutthaya PK		—		0–1				0–4		1–0		
Bangkapi			—		1–2	2–4			0–4		0–0	
Chamchuri United			3–0	—		0–1		0–0	2–1			
Futera United	3–4	3–4			—					0–1		2–0
Kasem Bundit University	2–2	1–1				—		0–0	2–0		2–3	
Lopburi Poma	1–3	0–5		1–4	3–4		—			0–1		
North Bangkok University			1–0		0–0		5–0	—	3–0		2–1	
Prime Bangkok					2–0		2–0		—	3–0	2–3	6–1
PTU Pathum Thani	1–1		1–1			3–2				—		1–1
Royal Thai Air Force	1–1	4–0					7–2				—	
Singburi Warriors				1–2		0–0	1–0	1–6			2–4	—

Updated to match(es) played on 19 November 2026. Source: Thai League
Legend: Blue = home team win; Yellow = draw; Red = away team win.
For upcoming matches, an "a" indicates there is an article about the rivalry between the two participants.
