= 2025–26 Thai League 3 Cup =

BGC Muang Thai Insurance Cup

Tournament details
- Country: Thailand
- Dates: 29 November 2025 – 28 March 2026
- Teams: 53

Final positions
- Champions: PT Satun (1st title)
- Runners-up: Thonburi United

Tournament statistics
- Matches played: 123
- Goals scored: 343 (2.79 per match)
- Top goal scorer(s): Caio da Conceição Silva (10 goals)

Awards
- Best player: Caio da Conceição Silva

The 2025–26 Thai League 3 Cup is the 3rd season of a Thailand's knockout football competition. Matches are organized into two phases: the league and the knockout phases. In the league phase, clubs compete in a regionally based format with a fixed number of matches per club, while the knockout phase follows a single-elimination structure. The competition retains its sponsorship by BG Container Glass (BGC) and Muang Thai Insurance (MTI), and it is officially named the BGC Muang Thai Insurance Cup (Thai: บีจีซี เมืองไทยประกันภัย คัพ). A total of 53 clubs from the 2025–26 Thai League 3 are participating. The tournament commenced on 29 November 2025 and concluded with the final on 28 March 2026. The prize pool remains unchanged, with the champions awarded 3 million baht and the runners-up receiving 1 million baht.

== Calendar ==
Round	Date	Matches	Clubs	New entries this round
League phase	29 November 2025 – 4 January 2026	106	53 → 16	53 2025–26 Thai League 3
Round of 16	7 January 2026	8	16 → 8	
Quarter-finals	21 January 2026	4	8 → 4	
Semi-finals	4 February 2026 (1st leg); 4 March 2026 (2nd leg)	4	4 → 2	
Final	28 March 2026	1	2 → Champions	
Total				53 clubs

== Results ==
Note: N: Clubs from Northern region; NE: Clubs from Northeastern region; E: Clubs from Eastern region; C: Clubs from Central region; W: Clubs from Western region; S: Clubs from Southern region.

=== League phase ===
In the league phase, the 53 participating clubs are divided into six regions based on the 2025–26 Thai League 3 regional divisions. Unlike a traditional round-robin system, each club plays four matches (two at home and two away) against opponents randomly drawn by a computerized system within their region. Standings are maintained separately for each region. At the end of the league phase, the top two clubs from each region automatically qualify for the knockout phase. Additionally, the third-placed clubs from all six regions are ranked against each other, with the four best-performing clubs earning the remaining slots in the knockout phase.

==== Upper group ====
===== Northern region =====
Pos	Team	Pld	W	D	L	GF	GA	GD	Pts	Qualification
1	Chattrakan City	4	2	2	0	7	2	+5	8	Advance to round of 16
2	Khelang United	4	2	2	0	5	2	+3	8	Advance to round of 16
3	Chiangmai	4	2	1	1	6	3	+3	7	
4	Phichit United	4	2	1	1	7	5	+2	7 (Note: Phichit United ahead on away goals scored; Phichit United 4 goals, Maejo United 3 goals.)	
5	Maejo United	4	2	1	1	7	5	+2	7	
6	Northern Nakhon Mae Sot United	4	2	0	2	10	8	+2	6	
7	Uttaradit	4	1	3	0	4	3	+1	6	
8	Kamphaengphet	4	0	0	4	3	11	−8	0	
9	Nakhon Sawan See Khwae City	4	0	0	4	3	13	−10	0	

Source: Thai League
Rules for classification: 1) Points; 2) Goal difference; 3) Goals scored; 4) Away goals scored; 5) Wins; 6) Away wins.
Notes:

29 November 2025	Kamphaengphet (N)	0–2	Maejo United (N)	Mueang, Kamphaeng Phet
15:30 (UTC+7)		Report	Douglas Mineiro 78' (pen.); Bright Friday 90+5'	Stadium: Cha Kung Rao Stadium; Attendance: 80; Referee: Chitchanuphong Ketsana; Assistant referees: Teerapong Oma, Somlak Saefa; Fourth official: Tanavit Prompet

30 November 2025	Nakhon Sawan See Khwae City (N)	0–2	Khelang United (N)	Mueang, Nakhon Sawan
15:30 (UTC+7)		Report	Sirachat Krasaethong 76'; Kittisak Roekyamdee 90+3'	Stadium: Nakhon Sawan Provincial Stadium; Attendance: 64; Referee: Suchart Kuisue; Assistant referees: Sornram Yutim, Tanapong Chaichana; Fourth official: Suphanat Yainta

30 November 2025	Uttaradit (N)	1–1	Chattrakan City (N)	Mueang, Uttaradit
15:30 (UTC+7)	Thanat Tangnontanakorn 59'	Report	Chijindu Sunday Edmund 82'	Stadium: Uttaradit Provincial Stadium; Attendance: 602; Referee: Akkarachai Khanthalee; Assistant referees: Chawanakorn Asumpinnapong, Warakron Songkam; Fourth official: Nattawut Pornchaiwirun

30 November 2025	Phichit United (N)	0–0	Chiangmai (N)	Mueang, Phichit
18:00 (UTC+7)		Report		Stadium: Phichit Stadium; Attendance: 650; Referee: Doungkaew Doungtawan; Assistant referees: Tudsanee Khuanpet, Siwakorn Singthana; Fourth official: Piyapong Thongkhain

3 December 2025	Northern Nakhon Mae Sot United (N)	5–2	Nakhon Sawan See Khwae City (N)	Mae Sot, Tak
15:30 (UTC+7)	Boonkerd Chaiyasin 4', 34'; Apisit Bunsrikul 39'; Sutthiphat Phophrm 51'; Tanawat Lekthong 59'	Report	Treethong Thongtong 64'; Thitiphan Khanoeinham 90+2' (pen.)	Stadium: Five Border Districts Stadium; Attendance: 52; Referee: Piyapong Thongkhain; Assistant referees: Songrit Trakulchai, Thanapak Nualchan; Fourth official: Nattawut Pornchaiwirun

6 December 2025	Maejo United (N)	2–1	Northern Nakhon Mae Sot United (N)	Doi Saket, Chiang Mai
16:00 (UTC+7)	Bright Friday 36', 65'	Report	Tewidikum Tah Nivan 75'	Stadium: Stadium of Rajamangala University of Technology Lanna, Doi Saket Campus; Attendance: 36; Referee: Suphanat Yainta; Assistant referees: Teerapong Oma, Natthawut Tasmak; Fourth official: Prasert Arjpukdee

6 December 2025	Chattrakan City (N)	2–1	Phichit United (N)	Mueang, Phitsanulok
17:00 (UTC+7)	Diarra Junior Aboubacar 34'; Pissanu Sibutta 75'	Report	Winai Aimoat 39'	Stadium: Stadium of Pibulsongkram Rajabhat University; Attendance: 300; Referee: Narongsak Kubkun; Assistant referees: Suwit Kongtongnok, Jonrak Sangcharern; Fourth official: Nattawut Pornchaiwirun

7 December 2025	Chiangmai (N)	4–1	Kamphaengphet (N)	Mueang, Chiang Mai
18:00 (UTC+7)	Phitsanusak Chuenbua-in 9'; Kueanun Junumpai 18'; Jakrapon Upakara 63'; Jiranthanin Khamla 90'	Report	Kittipat Somnak 84'	Stadium: Chiangmai City Municipality Stadium; Attendance: 857; Referee: Tanavit Prompet; Assistant referees: Jarin Champakpriew, Suphatcha Maprang; Fourth official: Supat Chaingam

7 December 2025	Khelang United (N)	1–1	Uttaradit (N)	Mueang, Lampang
18:00 (UTC+7)	Thodsaphon Saichai 84'	Report	Saran Tadtiang 55'	Stadium: Lampang Provincial Stadium; Attendance: 225; Referee: Tanyathon Phetch-udom; Assistant referees: Kritsawaphong Khamta, Jakkarin Sivilai; Fourth official: Ekkachai Juywong

13 December 2025	Maejo United (N)	2–3	Phichit United (N)	Doi Saket, Chiang Mai
16:00 (UTC+7)	Montree Siriwattanasuwan 63'; Suwicha Chittabut 90+6'	Report	Ranyapakorn Konsanthia 8'; Partchya Katethip 50', 53'	Stadium: Stadium of Rajamangala University of Technology Lanna, Doi Saket Campus; Attendance: 60; Referee: Doungkaew Doungtawan; Assistant referees: Songrit Trakulchai, Panuwat Khut Jaiwong; Fourth official: Chitchanuphong Ketsana

13 December 2025	Chiangmai (N)	0–1	Uttaradit (N)	Mueang, Chiang Mai
18:00 (UTC+7)		Report	Diego Silva 12'	Stadium: Chiangmai City Municipality Stadium; Attendance: 890; Referee: Chirawat Chomphoosee; Assistant referees: Kriangkrai Chaiya, Chumphon Khiaokhao; Fourth official: Thanison Onjiw

14 December 2025	Northern Nakhon Mae Sot United (N)	3–1	Kamphaengphet (N)	Mae Sot, Tak
15:30 (UTC+7)	Mubarak Mohammed Ahmed 45+1'; Naphat Deeprasert 51'; Cedrick Platini Kaham 86'	Report	Khwanchai Bunprakhom 26'	Stadium: Five Border Districts Stadium; Attendance: 75; Referee: Chookiat Boonchoo; Assistant referees: Anurut Samawimon, Thanaporn Ouicharoen; Fourth official: Bongkod Tiansavang

14 December 2025	Chattrakan City (N)	4–0	Nakhon Sawan See Khwae City (N)	Mueang, Phitsanulok
17:00 (UTC+7)	Punsa Hnunumkum 5', 12'; Weerawat Konsombut 65'; Natthawut Nueamai 78' (pen.)	Report		Stadium: Stadium of Pibulsongkram Rajabhat University; Referee: Jakkapong Pongpathet; Assistant referees: Burin Kasemkittikun, Saumphu Chaiwongsa; Fourth official: Tanavit Prompet

17 December 2025	Kamphaengphet (N)	1–2	Khelang United (N)	Mueang, Kamphaeng Phet
15:30 (UTC+7)	Thibet Paison 88'	Report	Yuri Martins Roque 2', 44'	Stadium: Cha Kung Rao Stadium; Attendance: 20; Referee: Narodom Phonprasit; Assistant referees: Woottipong Younan, Anantachai Saennarong; Fourth official: Piyapong Thongkhain

24 December 2025	Phichit United (N)	3–1	Northern Nakhon Mae Sot United (N)	Mueang, Phichit
15:30 (UTC+7)	Moussa Sanoh 16'; Theeradol Khaminkaew 34' (o.g.); Parinya Khattiya 72'	Report	Apisit Bunsrikul 14'	Stadium: Phichit Stadium; Referee: Narodom Phonprasit; Assistant referees: Suphatcha Maprang, Chawanakorn Asumpinnapong; Fourth official: Tanavit Prompet

24 December 2025	Nakhon Sawan See Khwae City (N)	1–2	Chiangmai (N)	Mueang, Nakhon Sawan
15:30 (UTC+7)	Uche Vincent Egbuhuzor 90+1'	Report	Kongphob Kamasit 5'; Olan Sirikunsathian 57'	Stadium: Nakhon Sawan Provincial Stadium; Referee: Ekkachai Juywong; Assistant referees: Channarong Tomklan, Suttikiat Nammakorn; Fourth official: Chirawat Chomphoosee

24 December 2025	Khelang United (N)	0–0	Chattrakan City (N)	Mueang, Lampang
15:30 (UTC+7)		Report		Stadium: Lampang Provincial Stadium; Attendance: 108; Referee: Suphanat Yainta; Assistant referees: Tudsanee Khuanpet, Teerapong Oma; Fourth official: Suchart Kuisue

24 December 2025	Uttaradit (N)	1–1	Maejo United (N)	Mueang, Uttaradit
15:30 (UTC+7)	Luan Santos 70'	Report	Douglas Mineiro 58'	Stadium: Uttaradit Provincial Stadium; Attendance: 195; Referee: Nattawut Pornchaiwirun; Assistant referees: Anurut Samawimon, Kosit Laochaem; Fourth official: Supat Chaingam

===== Northeastern region =====
Pos	Team	Pld	W	D	L	GF	GA	GD	Pts	Qualification
1	Udon Banjan United	4	3	1	0	9	2	+7	10	Advance to round of 16
2	Udon United	4	3	1	0	9	4	+5	10	Advance to round of 16
3	Khon Kaen	4	2	1	1	10	3	+7	7	Advance to round of 16
4	Muang Loei United	4	2	1	1	7	5	+2	7	
5	Surin City	4	2	0	2	7	3	+4	6	
6	Ubon Kruanapat	4	1	2	1	7	7	0	5	
7	Khon Kaen Mordindang	4	1	0	3	7	9	−2	3	
8	Roi Et PB United	4	1	0	3	3	9	−6	3	
9	Surin Khong Chee Mool	4	0	0	4	2	19	−17	0	

Source: Thai League
Rules for classification: 1) Points; 2) Goal difference; 3) Goals scored; 4) Away goals scored; 5) Wins; 6) Away wins.

29 November 2025	Surin City (NE)	3–0	Khon Kaen Mordindang (NE)	Mueang, Surin
17:00 (UTC+7)	Watthanapon Chinthong 31'; Kroekrit Rodmueang 45+1'; Nattawut Wutthiya 70'	Report		Stadium: Sri Narong Stadium; Attendance: 113; Referee: Kittiwat Kittpaksakun; Assistant referees: Chinnawat Kaiyasit, Watcharachat Loumpool; Fourth official: Wasan Promyaca

29 November 2025	Khon Kaen (NE)	1–3	Udon United (NE)	Mueang, Khon Kaen
18:00 (UTC+7)	Aphiwat Mitrak 62'	Report	Victor Clemente de Oliveira Capinan 71'; Jhakkarin Sitthichan 75'; Danuson Wijitpunya 86'	Stadium: Khon Kaen PAO. Stadium; Attendance: 1,166; Referee: Prakasit Chantarasawang; Assistant referees: Atiwat Yapakdee, Limonfine Poxpong; Fourth official: Yodsakorn Pakdeesuwan

30 November 2025	Ubon Kruanapat (NE)	1–1	Muang Loei United (NE)	Mueang, Ubon Ratchathani
15:30 (UTC+7)	Thapoppon Butkaew 74'	Report	Prin Prathummet 62'	Stadium: Stadium of Ubon Ratchathani Sports School; Attendance: 219; Referee: Apisit Yotayut; Assistant referees: Setthawut Yothachan, Phakorn Dongja-roen; Fourth official: Chairat Phooalai

30 November 2025	Udon Banjan United (NE)	2–0	Roi Et PB United (NE)	Mueang, Udon Thani
15:30 (UTC+7)	Sakda Noppakdee 55'; Sittipat Kreearee 60'	Report		Stadium: Stadium of Thailand National Sports University, Udon Thani Campus; Attendance: 219; Referee: Pongdanai Sadsadee; Assistant referees: Jirapun Hongsudta, Korakit Sonjan; Fourth official: Komkrit Sawong

6 December 2025	Surin Khong Chee Mool (NE)	0–4	Udon Banjan United (NE)	Mueang, Surin
15:30 (UTC+7)		Report	João Guimarães 6', 78', 84'; Natdanai Chudtale 69'	Stadium: Stadium of Rajamangala University of Technology Isan, Surin Campus; Referee: Patiyut Monthianart; Assistant referees: Kittipong Pholdee, Wasan Promyaca; Fourth official: Teerapak Saibun

6 December 2025	Muang Loei United (NE)	1–0	Surin City (NE)	Mueang, Loei
15:30 (UTC+7)	Abdelrahman Osama Mohamed 14'	Report		Stadium: Stadium of Loei Rajabhat University; Referee: Anan Keawmuangkhun; Assistant referees: Wuttiphat Khuttawong, Natthaphong Saengsuwannarat; Fourth official: Tanade Intasan

7 December 2025	Udon United (NE)	2–2	Ubon Kruanapat (NE)	Mueang, Udon Thani
15:30 (UTC+7)	Niwat Nonkao 38'; Danuson Wijitpunya 68'	Report	Wisanu Choedchu 51', 54'	Stadium: Stadium of Thailand National Sports University, Udon Thani Campus; Attendance: 174; Referee: Pisal Motongsri; Assistant referees: Chaisiri Sonnam, Natthapol Sewakawihalee; Fourth official: Komkrit Sawong

7 December 2025	Roi Et PB United (NE)	0–3	Khon Kaen (NE)	Mueang, Roi Et
18:00 (UTC+7)		Report	Punyachotc Namjatturat 26'; Thanaphat Phutnok 46'; Piyachanok Darit 89' (o.g.)	Stadium: Roi Et Provincial Stadium; Attendance: 480; Referee: Teeramate Pooprang; Assistant referees: Chinnawat Kaiyasit, Winai Sinsimha; Fourth official: Warutsom Sompan

13 December 2025	Surin City (NE)	1–2	Udon United (NE)	Mueang, Surin
15:30 (UTC+7)	Chitsanupong Minphimai 12'	Report	Victor Clemente de Oliveira Capinan 79'; Sakari Tukiainen 87'	Stadium: Sri Narong Stadium; Attendance: 150; Referee: Phaithun Onkhamloon; Assistant referees: Suksan Thongkoed, Apisit Yotayut; Fourth official: Thanapon Suwannaket

13 December 2025	Ubon Kruanapat (NE)	1–3	Roi Et PB United (NE)	Mueang, Ubon Ratchathani
17:00 (UTC+7)	Phongchana Kongkirit 71'	Report	Heman Kittiamphaipruek 24'; Chalermpong Kerdkaew 35' (pen.); Phalakon Wokiang 77'	Stadium: Stadium of Ubon Ratchathani Rajabhat University; Attendance: 320; Referee: Vitsawa Nanchana; Assistant referees: Ponlakrit Wangkoon, Anantip Phopan; Fourth official: Suriyawong Ramsri

14 December 2025	Khon Kaen Mordindang (NE)	1–3	Muang Loei United (NE)	Mueang, Khon Kaen
17:00 (UTC+7)	Pakawat Wongsrikaew 74'	Report	Winiton Duangchai 8'; Marciano de Oliveira Filho Odair 48'; Anucha Kaeokanha 51'	Stadium: Stadium of Khon Kaen University; Referee: Uthai Purase; Assistant referees: Yuranan Nukhao, Ittipon Homdee; Fourth official: Palakon Hasuk

14 December 2025	Khon Kaen (NE)	6–0	Surin Khong Chee Mool (NE)	Mueang, Khon Kaen
18:00 (UTC+7)	Worawaran Pholuea 7', 45+2', 48', 57'; Charin Boodhad 85'; Aphiwat Mitrak 90+3'	Report		Stadium: Khon Kaen PAO. Stadium; Attendance: 1,210; Referee: Thinakorn Daensamsuan; Assistant referees: Panuwat Kamba, Setthawut Yothachan; Fourth official: Thammanoon Sasen

17 December 2025	Muang Loei United (NE)	2–3	Udon Banjan United (NE)	Mueang, Udon Thani
15:30 (UTC+7)	Marciano de Oliveira Filho Odair 83'; Abdelrahman Osama Mohamed 90'	Report	Jirayu Saenap 35'; Natdanai Chudtale 45+3'; Prayad Pholput 90+3'	Stadium: Stadium of Thailand National Sports University, Udon Thani Campus; Attendance: 200; Referee: Komkrit Sawong; Assistant referees: Thatchai Sitthikhotr, Natthapol Sewakawihalee; Fourth official: Korakit Sonjan

17 December 2025	Khon Kaen Mordindang (NE)	6–1	Surin Khong Chee Mool (NE)	Mueang, Khon Kaen
17:00 (UTC+7)	Chunakorn Artnukarn 8', 53'; Tanapol Srithong 27'; Wasawat Unthaya 40'; Kittikon Saosamran 80'; Warawut Chariphai 90+1' (o.g.)	Report	Conteh Samson 31'	Stadium: Stadium of Khon Kaen University; Attendance: 60; Referee: Chairat Phooalai; Assistant referees: Kittichot Worasan, Surachart Thasungka; Fourth official: Tanakorn Chaikanya

23 December 2025	Udon Banjan United (NE)	0–0	Khon Kaen (NE)	Mueang, Udon Thani
15:30 (UTC+7)		Report		Stadium: Stadium of Thailand National Sports University, Udon Thani Campus; Attendance: 208; Referee: Sittichai Saramai; Assistant referees: Saengsuree Pochana, Natdanai Pongjit; Fourth official: Tanade Intasan

24 December 2025	Surin Khong Chee Mool (NE)	1–3	Ubon Kruanapat (NE)	Mueang, Surin
15:30 (UTC+7)	Jakkarin Boonjit 76'	Report	Phongchana Kongkirit 6' (pen.), 73'; Wanchaiya Charoenloi 90+1'	Stadium: Stadium of Rajamangala University of Technology Isan, Surin Campus; Attendance: 46; Referee: Methas Kumarasit; Assistant referees: Nuttapong Khunlert, Jetsada Wongma; Fourth official: Suriyawong Ramsri

24 December 2025	Udon United (NE)	2–0	Khon Kaen Mordindang (NE)	Mueang, Udon Thani
15:30 (UTC+7)	Tawin Butsombat 90+2'; Pitipong Wongbut 90+7'	Report		Stadium: Stadium of Thailand National Sports University, Udon Thani Campus; Attendance: 198; Referee: Amnat Makklang; Assistant referees: Teerawat Khangkratoke, Payao Khuankhanueng; Fourth official: Teerasauk Pengpidet

24 December 2025	Roi Et PB United (NE)	0–3	Surin City (NE)	Mueang, Roi Et
15:30 (UTC+7)		Report	Puntakid Pombuppa 65', 68'; Kroekrit Rodmueang 83'	Stadium: Roi Et Provincial Stadium; Attendance: 250; Referee: Natthwut Nammuang; Assistant referees: Waratchanon Chombun, Watcharachat Loumpool; Fourth official: Warutsom Sompan

===== Eastern region =====
Pos	Team	Pld	W	D	L	GF	GA	GD	Pts	Qualification
1	Saimit Kabin United	4	4	0	0	10	3	+7	12	Advance to round of 16
2	Navy	4	3	1	0	6	2	+4	10	Advance to round of 16
3	Customs United	4	3	0	1	9	6	+3	9	Advance to round of 16
4	Burapha United	4	3	0	1	5	2	+3	9	
5	ACDC	4	2	0	2	8	7	+1	6	
6	Fleet	4	1	2	1	8	5	+3	5	
7	Bankhai United	4	1	2	1	4	3	+1	5	
8	Chachoengsao Hi-Tek	4	1	1	2	1	3	−2	4	
9	Padriew City	4	1	0	3	1	7	−6	3	
10	BFB Pattaya City	4	0	0	4	5	12	−7	0	
11	Pluakdaeng United	4	0	0	4	1	8	−7	0	

Source: Thai League
Rules for classification: 1) Points; 2) Goal difference; 3) Goals scored; 4) Away goals scored; 5) Wins; 6) Away wins.

29 November 2025	ACDC (E)	3–1	BFB Pattaya City (E)	Sattahip, Chonburi
15:30 (UTC+7)	Ifeoluwa David Bamigboye 3', 79'; Phasit Panmoon 42'	Report	Aekkarat Maneekhot 67'	Stadium: Battleship Stadium; Attendance: 85; Referee: Kanakorn Teansawat; Assistant referees: Komsan Wantavee, Kodcharat Rattanachot; Fourth official: Monruedee Junmai

30 November 2025	Burapha United (E)	0–1	Navy (E)	Ban Bueng, Chonburi
16:00 (UTC+7)		Report	Pongpan Parapan 13'	Stadium: Banbueng Town Municipality Stadium; Attendance: 613; Referee: Kokiat Bunchoo; Assistant referees: Jakkapong Saothaisong, Ukrit Bung-or; Fourth official: Surasak Khamphan

30 November 2025	Padriew City (E)	0–4	Fleet (E)	Mueang, Chachoengsao
17:00 (UTC+7)		Report	Chatri Rattanawong 14', 36'; Teera Simon Hodgkinson 68'; Tiago Chulapa 90'	Stadium: Chachoengsao Provincial Stadium; Attendance: 95; Referee: Theerayut Radarit; Assistant referees: Attapol Soheng, Jakkarin Pirunkan; Fourth official: Peeyaporn Worachaikueakun

30 November 2025	Customs United (E)	2–0	Pluakdaeng United (E)	Bang Phli, Samut Prakan
17:00 (UTC+7)	Sirawich Punsomjai 54'; Anumat Seewongkaew 66'	Report		Stadium: Stadium of Customs Department, Lad Krabang 54; Attendance: 115; Referee: Pongthep Raipimai; Assistant referees: Jeerapat Arinpeng, Suwit Auttathun; Fourth official: Chinnaphat Lablae

30 November 2025	Bankhai United (E)	0–0	Chachoengsao Hi-Tek (E)	Ban Khai, Rayong
18:00 (UTC+7)		Report		Stadium: Wai Krong Stadium; Attendance: 150; Referee: Watcharasak Intharak; Assistant referees: Siravich Konngam, Premsak Rungrueang; Fourth official: Adisai Pongnairat

6 December 2025	Saimit Kabin United (E)	3–0	Customs United (E)	Kabin Buri, Prachinburi
15:30 (UTC+7)	Sonkritsana Sirimanon 50'; Aphiwat Sukwinai 83'; Marcelo de Souza Silva 90+1'	Report		Stadium: Nomklao Maharat Stadium; Attendance: 125; Referee: Watcharasak Intharak; Assistant referees: Adisai Pongnairat, Peeyaporn Worachaikueakun; Fourth official: Niruch Panjontuk

6 December 2025	Chachoengsao Hi-Tek (E)	0–1	Padriew City (E)	Mueang, Chachoengsao
18:00 (UTC+7)		Report	Atip Wattana 52'	Stadium: Chachoengsao Town Municipality Stadium; Attendance: 299; Referee: Kanakorn Teansawat; Assistant referees: Jeerapat Arinpeng, Phutthaphong Khongkraphan; Fourth official: Parinya Kotid

7 December 2025	Pluakdaeng United (E)	1–2	Burapha United (E)	Pluak Daeng, Rayong
15:30 (UTC+7)	Chinathip Phormthong 90+3'	Report	Prawit Jittithaworn 69'; Sutayut Ura 83'	Stadium: CK Stadium; Attendance: 150; Referee: Chayapol Laosuphan; Assistant referees: Siravich Konngam, Narinsak Thongkham; Fourth official: Theerapon Nakthong

7 December 2025	Fleet (E)	2–2	Bankhai United (E)	Sattahip, Chonburi
15:30 (UTC+7)	Chatri Rattanawong 13'; Rafael Galhardo 51'	Report	Phakhawat Seekhieo 35'; Surasit Netyong 87' (o.g.)	Stadium: Battleship Stadium; Attendance: 105; Referee: Panya Nawasimainam; Assistant referees: Thanadon Tantrakul, Thanapon Pantaeak; Fourth official: Piyanun Wattanawatchsuk

7 December 2025	Navy (E)	2–0	ACDC (E)	Sattahip, Chonburi
17:00 (UTC+7)	Wachirawat Kongruen 69'; Phodchara Chainarong 85'	Report		Stadium: Sattahip Navy Stadium; Attendance: 180; Referee: Theerayut Radarit; Assistant referees: Suwit Auttathun, Kanathip Waithaisong; Fourth official: Pongthep Raipimai

13 December 2025	Burapha United (E)	1–0	Bankhai United (E)	Ban Bueng, Chonburi
16:00 (UTC+7)	Prawit Jittithaworn 72'	Report		Stadium: Banbueng Town Municipality Stadium; Attendance: 473; Referee: Chinnaphat Lablae; Assistant referees: Apidet Rawangton, Thitipong Thongprom; Fourth official: Parinya Kotid

13 December 2025	BFB Pattaya City (E)	1–2	Saimit Kabin United (E)	Bang Lamung, Chonburi
16:00 (UTC+7)	Sahachard Hirintranukul 90'	Report	Phooripat Wintachai 53', 83'	Stadium: Nong Prue Stadium; Attendance: 149; Referee: Chaiyot Hapholdee; Assistant referees: Attapol Soheng, Jakkarin Pirunkan; Fourth official: Chayapol Laosuphan

13 December 2025	Padriew City (E)	0–1	Customs United (E)	Mueang, Chachoengsao
17:00 (UTC+7)		Report	Khatawut Poladao 90+4'	Stadium: Chachoengsao Provincial Stadium; Attendance: 180; Referee: Ekkalak Muangkhotr; Assistant referees: Thanadon Tantrakul, Suwit Auttathun; Fourth official: Theerapon Nakthong

14 December 2025	ACDC (E)	3–0	Pluakdaeng United (E)	Sattahip, Chonburi
15:30 (UTC+7)	Nitithum Sirisin 3'; Pattrayod Wetmanit 79'; Ifeoluwa David Bamigboye 90+4'	Report		Stadium: Battleship Stadium; Attendance: 100; Referee: Anocha Praphatson; Assistant referees: Premsak Rungrueang, Peeyaporn Worachaikueakun; Fourth official: Panya Nawasimainam

14 December 2025	Navy (E)	2–2	Fleet (E)	Sattahip, Chonburi
17:00 (UTC+7)	Napat Kuttanan 12'; Yuri Martins Rocha 61'	Report	Chatri Rattanawong 38'; Somsak Musikaphan 85'	Stadium: Sattahip Navy Stadium; Attendance: 425; Referee: Kanakorn Teansawat; Assistant referees: Adisai Pongnairat, Piyanun Wattanawatchsuk; Fourth official: Bussarin Sukkakit

17 December 2025	Fleet (E)	0–1	Saimit Kabin United (E)	Sattahip, Chonburi
15:30 (UTC+7)		Report	Achirawat Saimee 84'	Stadium: Battleship Stadium; Attendance: 80; Referee: Phadoongkiat Piangdee; Assistant referees: Phutthaphong Khongkraphan, Jenwit Kamthai; Fourth official: Theerapon Nakthong

17 December 2025	BFB Pattaya City (E)	0–1	Chachoengsao Hi-Tek (E)	Bang Lamung, Chonburi
16:00 (UTC+7)		Report	Tammapet Kangthong 67'	Stadium: Nong Prue Stadium; Attendance: 199; Referee: Palathip Homwarn; Assistant referees: Suwida Wongkraisorn, Teerawat Insa; Fourth official: Piyanun Wattanawatchsuk

24 December 2025	Pluakdaeng United (E)	0–1	Navy (E)	Pluak Daeng, Rayong
15:30 (UTC+7)		Report	Phodchara Chainarong 56'	Stadium: CK Stadium; Attendance: 170; Referee: Watcharasak Intharak; Assistant referees: Premsak Rungrueang, Peeyaporn Worachaikueakun; Fourth official: Panya Nawasimainam

24 December 2025	Chachoengsao Hi-Tek (E)	0–2	Burapha United (E)	Mueang, Chachoengsao
15:30 (UTC+7)		Report	Kasidech Wettayawong 79'; Warayut Klomnak 90+3'	Stadium: Chachoengsao Town Municipality Stadium; Attendance: 168; Referee: Niruch Panjontuk; Assistant referees: Piyanun Wattanawatchsuk, Monruedee Junmai; Fourth official: Nattipong Jaimuang

24 December 2025	Saimit Kabin United (E)	4–2	ACDC (E)	Kabin Buri, Prachinburi
15:30 (UTC+7)	Seksan Ranok 40', 88'; Artit Sankla 71', 77'	Report	Nitithum Sirisin 3'; Phattharadanai Alapthong 82'	Stadium: Nomklao Maharat Stadium; Attendance: 100; Referee: Pichet Chumcha; Assistant referees: Theerapat Insena, Phichayut Noitathong; Fourth official: Chakrit Siripong

24 December 2025	Customs United (E)	6–3	BFB Pattaya City (E)	Bang Phli, Samut Prakan
15:30 (UTC+7)	Natthawut Srichan 7'; Nawattakorn Sriphiromvijit 70'; Warin Namnaowsang 79' (o.g.); Naoki Uemoto 83'; Shunta Hasegawa 85'; Anan Samaae 90+4'	Report	Kaikitti Inuthen 53'; Naphat Chumpanya 90'; Roengchai Kesada 90+2'	Stadium: Stadium of Customs Department, Lad Krabang 54; Attendance: 87; Referee: Pichit Thongjanmoon; Assistant referees: Panuwat Weawkum, Thanankrid Noichanwong; Fourth official: Jirawat Singhol

24 December 2025	Bankhai United (E)	2–0	Padriew City (E)	Ban Khai, Rayong
15:30 (UTC+7)	Thammawat Trailum 40'; Chinnapat Kaikaew 52'	Report		Stadium: Wai Krong Stadium; Attendance: 158; Referee: Palathip Homwarn; Assistant referees: Jeerapat Arinpeng, Attapol Soheng; Fourth official: Kanakorn Teansawat

==== Lower group ====
===== Central region =====
Pos	Team	Pld	W	D	L	GF	GA	GD	Pts	Qualification
1	Royal Thai Air Force	4	2	2	0	9	5	+4	8	Advance to round of 16
2	Kasem Bundit University	4	2	2	0	6	3	+3	8	Advance to round of 16
3	Prime Bangkok	4	2	1	1	7	5	+2	7	Advance to round of 16
4	North Bangkok University	4	1	2	1	5	5	0	5 (Note: North Bangkok University ahead on away wins; North Bangkok University 1 away win, PTU Pathum Thani 0 away wins.)	
5	PTU Pathum Thani	4	1	2	1	5	5	0	5	
6	Angthong	4	1	1	2	4	4	0	4	
7	Chamchuri United	4	1	1	2	3	5	−2	4	
8	Futera United	4	1	1	2	2	5	−3	4	
9	Singburi Warriors	4	0	2	2	4	8	−4	2	

Source: Thai League
Rules for classification: 1) Points; 2) Goal difference; 3) Goals scored; 4) Away goals scored; 5) Wins; 6) Away wins.
Notes:

29 November 2025	Chamchuri United (C)	0–1	Futera United (C)	Min Buri, Bangkok
15:30 (UTC+7)		Report	Nattawut Jandit 90+1' (pen.)	Stadium: Stadium of Kasem Bundit University; Attendance: 150; Referee: Aidsara Gaedthai; Assistant referees: Khomchalach Lekhawijit, Pawarin Chukong; Fourth official: Trin Sahachaipat

29 November 2025	Singburi Warriors (C)	2–2	Royal Thai Air Force (C)	Mueang, Singburi
15:30 (UTC+7)	Kamon Maninuan 33'; Amirmohammad Karamdar 45+3'	Report	Piyapat Suksai 36'; Peerawat Rarang 67'	Stadium: Singburi PAO. Stadium; Attendance: 250; Referee: Pichit Thongjanmoon; Assistant referees: Sujin Rodart, Bukhori Lehnuh; Fourth official: Niwet Mala

30 November 2025	North Bangkok University (C)	1–1	Prime Bangkok (C)	Thanyaburi, Pathum Thani
15:30 (UTC+7)	Erick Luis 19'	Report	Pirada Larsawat 68'	Stadium: Stadium of North Bangkok University; Attendance: 150; Referee: Suwat Wongsuwan; Assistant referees: Waranon Soonsuwan, Haroot Himbenmut; Fourth official: Pheerapat Yodnak

30 November 2025	Angthong (C)	2–0	PTU Pathum Thani (C)	Mueang, Ang Thong
15:30 (UTC+7)	Patiphan Panneangpech 26' (pen.); Atikan Phanprahas 78'	Report		Stadium: Angthong Provincial Stadium; Attendance: 274; Referee: Pichet Chumcha; Assistant referees: Tibeth Longtree, Padsakorn Jaihom; Fourth official: Pornpumin Chaiyo

6 December 2025	Kasem Bundit University (C)	1–1	Angthong (C)	Min Buri, Bangkok
15:30 (UTC+7)	Yossapat Sakprom 21'	Report	Marko Milenkovic 65'	Stadium: Stadium of Kasem Bundit University; Attendance: 270; Referee: Pichit Thongjanmoon; Assistant referees: Supakorn Ruangrit, Wilawan Rattanakhot; Fourth official: Kittithat Kengketkorn

7 December 2025	Prime Bangkok (C)	4–2	Singburi Warriors (C)	Lak Si, Bangkok
15:30 (UTC+7)	Aphirak Suankan 26'; Wachirawit Tupmuang 38'; Pirada Larsawat 57'; Kamin Kurakanok 77'	Report	Suriya Pongprung 19'; Kamon Maninuan 78'	Stadium: NT Stadium; Attendance: 428; Referee: Pornpumin Chaiyo; Assistant referees: Khomchalach Lekhawijit, Surachai Kumkeaw; Fourth official: Theerapon Nonthakhamjan

7 December 2025	Futera United (C)	1–2	North Bangkok University (C)	Khlong Luang, Pathum Thani
15:30 (UTC+7)	Puripat Siriwat 33'	Report	Jaden Marvin Meyer 15'; Erick Luis 42'	Stadium: Stadium of Bangkok University; Attendance: 115; Referee: Surathat Sanont; Assistant referees: Nanthawat Chobsuan, Thakun Meekaew; Fourth official: Nattaphak Sawasdee

7 December 2025	PTU Pathum Thani (C)	1–1	Chamchuri United (C)	Bang Sai, Phra Nakhon Si Ayutthaya
15:30 (UTC+7)	Célio Guilherme da Silva Santos 12'	Report	Watcharapong Wanthong 70'	Stadium: Ratchakram Stadium; Attendance: 100; Referee: Trin Sahachaipat; Assistant referees: Fa-is Sohdalae, Titima Wongkhan; Fourth official: Norrasead Sukdee

13 December 2025	North Bangkok University (C)	2–2	PTU Pathum Thani (C)	Thanyaburi, Pathum Thani
15:30 (UTC+7)	Erick Luis 25', 78' (pen.)	Report	Pakkanan Meecheu 33' (o.g.); Phongsathon Thongko 41'	Stadium: Stadium of North Bangkok University; Attendance: 145; Referee: Kokiat Bunchoo; Assistant referees: Tibeth Longtree, Ritthiphong Phimpapan; Fourth official: Pichit Thongjanmoon

13 December 2025	Singburi Warriors (C)	0–0	Futera United (C)	Mueang, Singburi
15:30 (UTC+7)		Report		Stadium: Singburi PAO. Stadium; Attendance: 200; Referee: Jatupol Kidklang; Assistant referees: Jakkapong Saothaisong, Bukhori Lehnuh; Fourth official: Watchara Wongkhan

14 December 2025	Chamchuri United (C)	0–2	Kasem Bundit University (C)	Min Buri, Bangkok
15:30 (UTC+7)		Report	Wanit Jaisaen 28'; Ronnachai Rangsiyo 70'	Stadium: Stadium of Kasem Bundit University; Attendance: 200; Referee: Suthipong Teekhasuk; Assistant referees: Phichayut Noitathong, Niracha Sangprasit; Fourth official: Titima Wongkhan

14 December 2025	Royal Thai Air Force (C)	2–1	Prime Bangkok (C)	Khlong Luang, Pathum Thani
15:30 (UTC+7)	Shinnawut Thanomsingha 22'; Tanakit Rodwinit 72'	Report	Kittiporn Chueachil 43'	Stadium: Stadium of Bangkok University; Attendance: 118; Referee: Pichet Chumcha; Assistant referees: Theerapat Insena, Arpaporn Thaisoda; Fourth official: Pornpumin Chaiyo

17 December 2025	Prime Bangkok (C)	1–0	Angthong (C)	Lak Si, Bangkok
15:30 (UTC+7)	Teerapong Malai 15'	Report		Stadium: NT Stadium; Attendance: 420; Referee: Aidsara Gaedthai; Assistant referees: Sorawit Kularat, Palakorn Parasatit; Fourth official: Thanankrid Noichanwong

17 December 2025	Royal Thai Air Force (C)	2–2	Kasem Bundit University (C)	Lam Luk Ka, Pathum Thani
15:30 (UTC+7)	Sonthaya Saengdaeng 45+1'; Tayasit Manjit 88'	Report	Tanakrit Hansantia 24' (o.g.); Sontaya Thotam 48'	Stadium: Dhupatemiya Stadium; Attendance: 120; Referee: Dassakhon Hokla; Assistant referees: Tanakorn Leechaisathaporn, Chakrit Siripong; Fourth official: Tonphetr Arnokkaeo

24 December 2025	Angthong (C)	1–2	Chamchuri United (C)	Mueang, Ang Thong
15:30 (UTC+7)	Nattawut Esa 83' (pen.)	Report	Pannathorn Rangchangkul 59', 63'	Stadium: Angthong Provincial Stadium; Attendance: 171; Referee: Watchara Wongkhan; Assistant referees: Kittipon Meeporn, Woraphob Thaweesuk; Fourth official: Pheerapat Yodnak

24 December 2025	Kasem Bundit University (C)	1–0	North Bangkok University (C)	Min Buri, Bangkok
15:30 (UTC+7)	Wanit Jaisaen 90+6'	Report		Stadium: Stadium of Kasem Bundit University; Attendance: 480; Referee: Trin Sahachaipat; Assistant referees: Waranon Soonsuwan, Titima Wongkhan; Fourth official: Surachai Kumkeaw

24 December 2025	Futera United (C)	0–3	Royal Thai Air Force (C)	Khlong Luang, Pathum Thani
15:30 (UTC+7)		Report	Boungou Kombo Chriss-Alex, Ferriol 3', 19'; Emmanuel Kwame Akadom 27'	Stadium: Stadium of Bangkok University; Attendance: 107; Referee: Chaiwat Rupsa-at; Assistant referees: Bukhori Lehnuh, Pawarin Chukong; Fourth official: Danai Yommool

24 December 2025	PTU Pathum Thani (C)	2–0	Singburi Warriors (C)	Bang Sai, Phra Nakhon Si Ayutthaya
15:30 (UTC+7)	Atiphon Noree 38'; Anooruk Suepsunthon 47'	Report		Stadium: Ratchakram Stadium; Referee: Aidsara Gaedthai; Assistant referees: Khomchalach Lekhawijit, Wilawan Rattanakhot; Fourth official: Poovadol Mechumnarn

===== Western region =====
Pos	Team	Pld	W	D	L	GF	GA	GD	Pts	Qualification
1	Samut Sakhon City	4	4	0	0	13	4	+9	12	Advance to round of 16
2	Samut Songkhram City	4	3	0	1	4	2	+2	9	Advance to round of 16
3	Thonburi United	4	2	1	1	5	2	+3	7	Advance to round of 16
4	Thap Luang United	4	2	1	1	3	2	+1	7	
5	Nonthaburi United	4	1	1	2	4	4	0	4	
6	VRN Muangnont	4	1	1	2	3	6	−3	4	
7	Rajpracha	4	1	0	3	5	8	−3	3	
8	Hua Hin City	4	0	0	4	3	12	−9	0	

Source: Thai League
Rules for classification: 1) Points; 2) Goal difference; 3) Goals scored; 4) Away goals scored; 5) Wins; 6) Away wins.

29 November 2025	Nonthaburi United (W)	0–2	Samut Sakhon City (W)	Bang Yai, Nonthaburi
15:30 (UTC+7)		Report	Nattakan Katrugsa 68'; Muddasir Chedeng 79'	Stadium: Nonthaburi Stadium; Attendance: 177; Referee: Rangsan Kangchainguan; Assistant referees: Patcharapon Losomsup, Atthaphon Somporncharoen; Fourth official: Titima Wongkhan

30 November 2025	Rajpracha (W)	4–1	Hua Hin City (W)	Bang Yai, Nonthaburi
16:00 (UTC+7)	Poppol Zeemadee 29'; Abbo Bouba 82'; Nattawut Thongchan 85' (o.g.); David Songsumpao 90+4' (o.g.)	Report	Choi Min-hyeok 59'	Stadium: Nonthaburi Stadium; Attendance: 245; Referee: Chaiwat Rupsa-at; Assistant referees: Palakorn Parasatit, Thanapong Chunhakam; Fourth official: Saravut Suksalee

30 November 2025	Thap Luang United (W)	1–0	Samut Songkhram City (W)	Mueang, Nakhon Pathom
18:00 (UTC+7)	Wuttichat Yiamming 6'	Report		Stadium: Thap Luang United Janded Stadium; Attendance: 717; Referee: Surathat Sanont; Assistant referees: Montree Sukcharoenprasoet, Narakorn Sapsuksai; Fourth official: Chonlasit Jiamjariya

3 December 2025	Thonburi United (W)	1–1	VRN Muangnont (W)	Nong Khaem, Bangkok
15:30 (UTC+7)	Tanasrap Srikotapach 15'	Report	Nicky Antonius Jan de Kroon 12'	Stadium: Thonburi Stadium; Attendance: 365; Referee: Sarawut Nenrod; Assistant referees: Nattphon Chuensamran, Chamnan Chomngam; Fourth official: Chaiwat Rupsa-at

6 December 2025	Samut Songkhram City (W)	1–0	Thonburi United (W)	Mueang, Nakhon Pathom
15:30 (UTC+7)	Kulawat Hatsathaphan 42'	Report		Stadium: Thap Luang United Janded Stadium; Attendance: 120; Referee: Alongkorn Feemuechang; Assistant referees: Surasing Sukoubaoong, Thanapong Chunhakam; Fourth official: Sarawut Nenrod

6 December 2025	Hua Hin City (W)	0–2	Thap Luang United (W)	Hua Hin, Prachuap Khiri Khan
15:30 (UTC+7)		Report	Atsada Homhual 7'; Siwa Pikulhom 32'	Stadium: Hua Hin Town Municipality Stadium; Attendance: 97; Referee: Thanaphon Chaowanon; Assistant referees: Pongsakorn Choosri, Den Bunyakittakun; Fourth official: Kunathorn Ketchantra

7 December 2025	VRN Muangnont (W)	0–3	Nonthaburi United (W)	Mueang, Nonthaburi
15:30 (UTC+7)		Report	Sirodom Konsungnoen 15', 85'; Kamin Muktharakosa 27'	Stadium: Nonthaburi City Municipality Stadium; Attendance: 180; Referee: Boonsong Prachumrak; Assistant referees: Muhammadadika Lomae, Suwijak Keama-suttinan; Fourth official: Aidsara Gaedthai

7 December 2025	Samut Sakhon City (W)	5–1	Rajpracha (W)	Mueang, Samut Sakhon
17:00 (UTC+7)	Worapart Chaenram 12'; Prasit Pattanatanawisut 33'; Diogo Pereira 61'; Chaiyut Srirat 73'; Nattakan Katrugsa 80'	Report	Poppol Zeemadee 9'	Stadium: Stadium of Thailand National Sports University, Samut Sakhon Campus; Attendance: 496; Referee: Saravut Suksalee; Assistant referees: Patcharapon Losomsup, Narakorn Sapsuksai; Fourth official: Tawan Suriyawong

13 December 2025	Rajpracha (W)	0–1	VRN Muangnont (W)	Thawi Watthana, Bangkok
15:30 (UTC+7)		Report	Apdussalam Saman 88'	Stadium: Stadium of Bangkokthonburi University; Attendance: 200; Referee: Patcharapong Chiangtaphisut; Assistant referees: Chanitpol Tarawan, Somrak Wisakha; Fourth official: Saravut Suksalee

13 December 2025	Samut Sakhon City (W)	4–2	Hua Hin City (W)	Mueang, Samut Sakhon
17:00 (UTC+7)	Chaiyut Srirat 23'; Diogo Pereira 45' (pen.), 84'; Nattakan Katrugsa 57'	Report	Jirapat Klimkaew 17'; Pantawit Inthamut 41'	Stadium: Stadium of Thailand National Sports University, Samut Sakhon Campus; Attendance: 337; Referee: Amnat Rattanapakdee; Assistant referees: Kunathorn Ketchantra, Yanin Nanthakampira; Fourth official: Verayut Kunkure

14 December 2025	Thonburi United (W)	2–0	Thap Luang United (W)	Nong Khaem, Bangkok
15:30 (UTC+7)	Phurewat Aunthong 76'; Narathip Kruearanya 87'	Report		Stadium: Thonburi Stadium; Attendance: 470; Referee: Nasri Tamat; Assistant referees: Phongphan Datphala, Sirawit Uttaboon; Fourth official: Thanaphon Chaowanon

20 December 2025	Nonthaburi United (W)	1–2	Samut Songkhram City (W)	Khlong Luang, Pathum Thani
15:30 (UTC+7)	Panutach Rungjang 82'	Report	Ugwuoke Pascal Ozioma 59'; Thanawin Tanthatemi 89'	Stadium: Stadium of Bangkok University; Attendance: 201; Referee: Piyawat Rittimunee; Assistant referees: Siwat Chaithong, Nattphon Chuensamran; Fourth official: Rangsan Kangchainguan

24 December 2025	Hua Hin City (W)	0–2	Thonburi United (W)	Hua Hin, Prachuap Khiri Khan
15:30 (UTC+7)		Report	Ademola Sodiq Adeyemi 11'; Narathip Kruearanya 58'	Stadium: Hua Hin Town Municipality Stadium; Attendance: 70; Referee: Alongkorn Feemuechang; Assistant referees: Kunathorn Ketchantra, Sathit Bootngam; Fourth official: Surasing Sukoubaoong

24 December 2025	VRN Muangnont (W)	1–2	Samut Sakhon City (W)	Mueang, Nonthaburi
15:30 (UTC+7)	Chayaphon Phanwiset 56'	Report	Chayaphat Srirat 13'; Thanachok Chitrak 16'	Stadium: Nonthaburi City Municipality Stadium; Attendance: 110; Referee: Nasri Tamat; Assistant referees: Sirawit Uttaboon, Nirut Kesaporn; Fourth official: Tonphetr Arnokkaeo

24 December 2025	Thap Luang United (W)	0–0	Nonthaburi United (W)	Mueang, Nakhon Pathom
15:30 (UTC+7)		Report		Stadium: Thap Luang United Janded Stadium; Attendance: 75; Referee: Worapon Sanjan; Assistant referees: Patcharapon Losomsup, Suwijak Keama-suttinan; Fourth official: Saravut Suksalee

24 December 2025	Samut Songkhram City (W)	1–0	Rajpracha (W)	Mueang, Ratchaburi
15:30 (UTC+7)	Ugwuoke Pascal Ozioma 75'	Report		Stadium: Ratchaburi Provincial Stadium; Attendance: 150; Referee: Boonsong Prachumrak; Assistant referees: Chamnan Chomngam, Somrak Wisakha; Fourth official: Sarawut Nenrod

===== Southern region =====
Pos	Team	Pld	W	D	L	GF	GA	GD	Pts	Qualification
1	Samui United	4	2	2	0	5	2	+3	8	Advance to round of 16
2	PT Satun	4	2	1	1	11	7	+4	7	Advance to round of 16
3	Nara United	4	2	1	1	6	7	−1	7	
4	PSU Surat Thani City	4	1	2	1	8	5	+3	5	
5	Phuket Andaman	4	1	2	1	5	7	−2	5	
6	Yala	4	0	2	2	4	6	−2	2	
7	Muang Trang United	4	0	2	2	2	7	−5	2	

Source: Thai League
Rules for classification: 1) Points; 2) Goal difference; 3) Goals scored; 4) Away goals scored; 5) Wins; 6) Away wins.

3 December 2025	PSU Surat Thani City (S)	5–0	Nara United (S)	Mueang, Surat Thani
15:30 (UTC+7)	Natdanai Makkarat 21'; Kritsada Jarujreet 28'; Toloba Aremu Kassim Mouyidine 45+4' (pen.); Natthawut Aiamchan 51'; Natthakit Keawphutphong 90+4'	Report		Stadium: Stadium of Prince of Songkla University, Surat Thani Campus; Attendance: 229; Referee: Jiraphan Yodphut; Assistant referees: Hadis Kaesaman, Amen Maprased; Fourth official: Thanthon Kongdee

7 December 2025	PT Satun (S)	2–2	Phuket Andaman (S)	Mueang, Satun
16:00 (UTC+7)	Mairon Natan Pereira Maciel Oliveira 8'; Caio da Conceição Silva 61'	Report	Mohamed Kouadio 47'; Athagorn Loungklang 69'	Stadium: Satun PAO. Stadium; Attendance: 1,381; Referee: Sarwan Karengsana; Assistant referees: Mayunai Kueteh, Firhan Useng; Fourth official: Wacharawit Suwanraksa

7 December 2025	Muang Trang United (S)	1–1	Samui United (S)	Huai Yot, Trang
18:00 (UTC+7)	Edson dos Santos Costa Júnior 10'	Report	Thanadon Yankaew 6'	Stadium: Muang Trang Stadium; Attendance: 624; Referee: Anas Poheng; Assistant referees: Suwit Kaewrod, Phongphana Nunkaew; Fourth official: Tiwakorn Sawangpong

7 December 2025	Yala (S)	1–1	PSU Surat Thani City (S)	Mueang, Yala
19:00 (UTC+7)	Jhonatan Bernardo 83'	Report	Alif Teemung 90+5' (o.g.)	Stadium: Stadium of Yala Rajabhat University; Attendance: 1,250; Referee: Montree Yeereem; Assistant referees: Fadeen Adae, Tanarat Jindanan; Fourth official: Pornsak Paksan

13 December 2025	PSU Surat Thani City (S)	2–4	PT Satun (S)	Mueang, Surat Thani
15:30 (UTC+7)	Sutthiwat Chamnan 79'; Natthawut Aiamchan 87'	Report	Lucas Gaudencio Moraes 2', 43'; Mairon Natan Pereira Maciel Oliveira 27' (pen.), 77'	Stadium: Stadium of Prince of Songkla University, Surat Thani Campus; Attendance: 220; Referee: Mayara Day; Assistant referees: Phongphana Nunkaew, Siwakorn Bunsuk; Fourth official: Waeaburaham Cheabu

13 December 2025	Phuket Andaman (S)	0–0	Muang Trang United (S)	Mueang, Phang Nga
15:30 (UTC+7)		Report		Stadium: Phang Nga Provincial Stadium; Attendance: 32; Referee: Aibroheem Sama; Assistant referees: Amen Maprased, Chanatip Chanpen; Fourth official: Wilat Arunrat

13 December 2025	Nara United (S)	1–1	Yala (S)	Mueang, Pattani
16:00 (UTC+7)	Thanawat Srisawat 84'	Report	Somprat Reuengnun 90+4'	Stadium: Pattani PAO. Stadium; Referee: Artit Srinoy; Assistant referees: Sakda Madmanang, Hadis Kaesaman; Fourth official: Pissanusak Sriyai

17 December 2025	Phuket Andaman (S)	3–2	Yala (S)	Mueang, Phang Nga
15:30 (UTC+7)	Mohamed Kouadio 58'; Anucha Liankattawa 67' (pen.); Suhaimee Roman 82' (o.g.)	Report	Somprat Reuengnun 14'; Rungsak Kodcharak 79'	Stadium: Phang Nga Provincial Stadium; Attendance: 100; Referee: Farid Baenak; Assistant referees: Panuwat Chumming, Waranyu Janhor; Fourth official: Thanthon Kongdee

17 December 2025	Samui United (S)	0–0	PSU Surat Thani City (S)	Ko Samui, Surat Thani
15:30 (UTC+7)		Report		Stadium: Ko Samui City Municipality International Stadium; Attendance: 568; Referee: Watcharin Nootong; Assistant referees: Suwit Kaewrod, Phipat Kongchamnan; Fourth official: Matoha Sayo

17 December 2025	Muang Trang United (S)	1–2	Nara United (S)	Huai Yot, Trang
18:00 (UTC+7)	Siraphob Plabroke 78'	Report	Thanawat Srisawat 17'; Akrom Mamood 57'	Stadium: Muang Trang Stadium; Attendance: 288; Referee: Teerapong Jandee; Assistant referees: Worawut Siraya, Sulaiman Jehha; Fourth official: Anwa Hayiyusoh

24 December 2025	PT Satun (S)	4–0	Muang Trang United (S)	Mueang, Satun
15:30 (UTC+7)	Anon Sanmad 4'; Caio da Conceição Silva 8' (pen.), 22', 90+3'	Report		Stadium: Satun PAO. Stadium; Attendance: 739; Referee: Tiwakorn Sawangpong; Assistant referees: Ameen Puteh, Fadeen Adae; Fourth official: Aibroheem Sama

24 December 2025	Nara United (S)	3–0	Phuket Andaman (S)	Mueang, Narathiwat
15:30 (UTC+7)	Lucas Grossi de Araújo Reis 53'; Thanawut Klinsukon 60'; Yannick Nussbaum 90'	Report		Stadium: Narathiwat PAO. Stadium; Attendance: 937; Referee: Farid Baenak; Assistant referees: Hadis Kaesaman, Tanakorn Tala; Fourth official: Yod Damhai

24 December 2025	Yala (S)	0–1	Samui United (S)	Mueang, Yala
15:30 (UTC+7)		Report	Rungsak Kodcharak 24' (o.g.)	Stadium: Stadium of Yala Rajabhat University; Attendance: 725; Referee: Sarwan Karengsana; Assistant referees: Mayunai Kueteh, Abdulrohim Sitiloh; Fourth official: Isree Bueraheng

4 January 2026	Samui United (S)	3–1	PT Satun (S)	Ko Samui, Surat Thani
15:30 (UTC+7)	Nattawut Thongchan 7'; Thanadon Yankaew 45+4'; Aliu Micheal Abdul 72'	Report	Suttipong Yaifai 27'	Stadium: Ko Samui City Municipality International Stadium; Attendance: 700; Referee: Mayara Day; Assistant referees: Saddam Beeru, Anwa Samaae; Fourth official: Irfan Sama

==== Ranking of third-placed clubs ====
===== Upper group =====
Pos	Regions	Team	Pld	W	D	L	GF	GA	GD	Pts	Qualification
1	Eastern	Customs United	4	3	0	1	9	6	+3	9	Advance to round of 16
2	Northeastern	Khon Kaen	4	2	1	1	10	3	+7	7	Advance to round of 16
3	Northern	Chiangmai	4	2	1	1	6	3	+3	7	

Source: Thai League
Rules for classification: 1) Points; 2) Goal difference; 3) Goals scored; 4) Away goals scored; 5) Wins; 6) Away wins.

===== Lower group =====
Pos	Regions	Team	Pld	W	D	L	GF	GA	GD	Pts	Qualification
1	Western	Thonburi United	4	2	1	1	5	2	+3	7	Advance to round of 16
2	Central	Prime Bangkok	4	2	1	1	7	5	+2	7	Advance to round of 16
3	Southern	Nara United	4	2	1	1	6	7	−1	7	

Source: Thai League
Rules for classification: 1) Points; 2) Goal difference; 3) Goals scored; 4) Away goals scored; 5) Wins; 6) Away wins.

=== Knockout phase ===
The knockout phase consists of 16 clubs: the 12 automatic qualifiers from the league phase and the four best third-placed clubs. The phase adopts a single-elimination format, starting from the Round of 16, followed by the quarter-finals, semi-finals, and the final. All matches in the knockout phase are single-legged except for the semi-finals, which are played over two legs. In the event of a tie in the semi-finals, the away goals rule applies, followed by penalty shootouts if necessary. The final is played as a single-leg match to determine the tournament champion.

Club	Qualified as
Upper group
Chattrakan City	Northern region winners
Udon Banjan United	Northeastern region winners
Saimit Kabin United	Eastern region winners
Khelang United	Northern region runners-up
Udon United	Northeastern region runners-up
Navy	Eastern region runners-up
Customs United	Best third-placed
Khon Kaen	2nd best third-placed
Lower group
Royal Thai Air Force	Central region winners
Samut Sakhon City	Western region winners
Samui United	Southern region winners
Kasem Bundit University	Central region runners-up
Samut Songkhram City	Western region runners-up
PT Satun	Southern region runners-up
Thonburi United	Best third-placed
Prime Bangkok	2nd best third-placed

==== Round of 16 ====
The round of 16 features 2 clubs from the Northern region, 3 clubs from the Northeastern region, 3 clubs from the Eastern region, 3 clubs from the Central region, 3 clubs from the Western region, and 2 clubs from the Southern region. The draw for this round took place on 30 December 2025. 22 goals were scored in this round.

Upper group

7 January 2026	Udon Banjan United (NE)	6–0	Customs United (E)	Mueang, Udon Thani
15:00 (UTC+7)	Felipe Micael 19', 77'; Mbongo'o ii Aime Boris 30'; Santirad Weing-in 45+3'; Wansakda Kaoboon 49'; Sudthirak Chuisiri 88'	Report		Stadium: Stadium of Thailand National Sports University, Udon Thani Campus; Attendance: 50; Referee: Yodsakorn Pakdeesuwan; Assistant referees: Panuwat Kamba, Sutiwat Kaewkhunthong; Fourth official: Suparak Nilkad

7 January 2026	Saimit Kabin United (E)	1–3	Khon Kaen (NE)	Kabin Buri, Prachinburi
15:00 (UTC+7)	Pongsakorn Innet 55'	Report	Worawaran Pholuea 53', 67'; Thanaphat Phutnok 81'	Stadium: Nomklao Maharat Stadium; Attendance: 136; Referee: Pichet Chumcha; Assistant referees: Sujin Rodart, Kittithat Kengketkorn; Fourth official: Chakrit Siripong

7 January 2026	Chattrakan City (N)	1–0	Udon United (NE)	Mueang, Phitsanulok
17:00 (UTC+7)	Tishan Tajahni Hanley 22'	Report		Stadium: Stadium of Pibulsongkram Rajabhat University; Attendance: 106; Referee: Suphanat Yainta; Assistant referees: Tanapong Chaichana, Burin Kasemkittikun; Fourth official: Suchart Kuisue

7 January 2026	Khelang United (N)	0–3	Navy (E)	Mueang, Lampang
18:00 (UTC+7)		Report	Akarawin Sawasdee 28', 31'; Pongpan Parapan 45+1'	Stadium: Lampang Provincial Stadium; Attendance: 187; Referee: Piyapong Thongkhain; Assistant referees: Songrit Trakulchai, Woottipong Younan; Fourth official: Tanavit Prompet

Lower group

7 January 2026	Royal Thai Air Force (C)	1–1 (a.e.t.) (2–4 p)	Samut Songkhram City (W)	Lam Luk Ka, Pathum Thani
15:00 (UTC+7)	Thummada Kokyai 74'	Report	Ugwuoke Pascal Ozioma 78' (pen.)	Stadium: Dhupatemiya Stadium; Attendance: 175; Referee: Watcharasak Intharak; Assistant referees: Siravich Konngam, Jeerapat Arinpeng; Fourth official: Nattipong Jaimuang
	Penalties
	Emmanuel Kwame Akadom (penalty scored); Boungou Kombo Chriss-Alex, Ferriol (penalty scored); Sittirak Kerdkhumthong (penalty missed); Sonthaya Saengdaeng (penalty missed)		(penalty missed) Thanawin Tanthatemi; (penalty scored) Ugwuoke Pascal Ozioma; (penalty scored) Boonyachat Kohklang; (penalty scored) Siwakorn Phetrueanthong; (penalty scored) Krit Kukuan

7 January 2026	Kasem Bundit University (C)	0–1	PT Satun (S)	Min Buri, Bangkok
15:00 (UTC+7)		Report	Caio da Conceição Silva 21'	Stadium: Stadium of Kasem Bundit University; Attendance: 450; Referee: Boonsong Prachumrak; Assistant referees: Surasing Sukoubaoong, Chamnan Chomngam; Fourth official: Noppadol Kamnotsri

7 January 2026	Samui United (S)	0–1	Thonburi United (W)	Ko Samui, Surat Thani
15:00 (UTC+7)		Report	Yannatat Wannatong 11'	Stadium: Ko Samui City Municipality International Stadium; Attendance: 568; Referee: Sarwan Karengsana; Assistant referees: Mayunai Kueteh, Faisal Hajikadae; Fourth official: Abdulloh Samaae

7 January 2026	Samut Sakhon City (W)	4–0	Prime Bangkok (C)	Mueang, Samut Sakhon
17:00 (UTC+7)	Supakorn Nutvijit 40'; Diego Patrocínio Nogueira Reis 47'; Diogo Pereira 86'; Prachpeecha Pachthong 89'	Report		Stadium: Stadium of Thailand National Sports University, Samut Sakhon Campus; Attendance: 572; Referee: Niruch Panjontuk; Assistant referees: Premsak Rungrueang, Thanadon Tantrakul; Fourth official: Monruedee Junmai

==== Quarter-finals ====
The quarter-finals consist of 8 clubs, all of which advanced as winners from the Round of 16. These clubs include 1 club from the Northern region, 2 clubs from the Northeastern region, 1 club from the Eastern region, 3 clubs from the Western region, and 1 club from the Southern region. The draw for this round took place on 30 December 2025. 16 goals were scored in this round.

21 January 2026	Udon Banjan United (NE)	1–2 (a.e.t.)	Thonburi United (W)	Mueang, Udon Thani
15:00 (UTC+7)	Felipe Micael 40'	Report	Narathip Kruearanya 30', 105'	Stadium: Stadium of Thailand National Sports University, Udon Thani Campus; Attendance: 141; Referee: Manuschai Chawong; Assistant referees: Thitibodi Rumnet, Anupong Sangtopo; Fourth official: Amnat Makklang

21 January 2026	Samut Songkhram City (W)	2–1	Navy (E)	Mueang, Nakhon Pathom
15:00 (UTC+7)	Natpasit Phunyasiriwan 20'; Ugwuoke Pascal Ozioma 72'	Report	Yoo Byung-soo 40'	Stadium: Thap Luang United Janded Stadium; Attendance: 110; Referee: Kittichai Huthip; Assistant referees: Sadsampan Kunsakoo, Kiadtisak Janmol; Fourth official: Wutthinan Jampawai

21 January 2026	PT Satun (S)	4–2 (a.e.t.)	Khon Kaen (NE)	Mueang, Satun
16:00 (UTC+7)	Caio da Conceição Silva 17', 111', 114'; Chaiyasit Popoon 25'	Report	Worawaran Pholuea 67', 74'	Stadium: Satun PAO. Stadium; Attendance: 2,819; Referee: Metawin Chujit; Assistant referees: Pornchai Kongdamni, Phitsanu Chusi; Fourth official: Anon Lohlor

21 January 2026	Chattrakan City (N)	2–2 (a.e.t.) (4–5 p)	Samut Sakhon City (W)	Mueang, Phitsanulok
17:00 (UTC+7)	Phuriwat Thongchai 58'; Tishan Tajahni Hanley 77'	Report	Worapart Chaenram 19'; Aekkaphon Fangnongdu 35'	Stadium: Stadium of Pibulsongkram Rajabhat University; Referee: Wirot Oupachit; Assistant referees: Suwit Kongtongnok, Jonrak Sangcharern; Fourth official: Suphanat Yainta
	Penalties
	Anawin Jujeen (penalty scored); Natthawut Nueamai (penalty missed); Nattakrit Thongnoppakun (penalty scored); Masahiro Fujiwara (penalty scored); Pissanu Sibutta (penalty scored)		(penalty scored) Diogo Pereira; (penalty scored) Prachpeecha Pachthong; (penalty scored) Aekkaphon Fangnongdu; (penalty scored) Diego Patrocínio Nogueira Reis; (penalty scored) Kongnathichai Boonma

==== Semi-finals ====
The semi-finals consist of 4 clubs, all advancing as winners from the quarter-finals. These clubs include 3 clubs from the Western region and 1 club from the Southern region. The draw for this round took place on 23 January 2026. 3 goals were scored in this round.

Team 1	Agg.	Team 2	1st leg	2nd leg
PT Satun (S)	2–0	Samut Sakhon City (W)	0–0	2–0
Samut Songkhram City (W)	0–1	Thonburi United (W)	0–1	0–0

1st leg

4 February 2026	PT Satun (S)	0–0	Samut Sakhon City (W)	Mueang, Satun
16:00 (UTC+7)		Report		Stadium: Satun PAO. Stadium; Attendance: 2,229; Referee: Ameen Lorma; Assistant referees: Phongsiri Chusi, Satira Yunyongkait; Fourth official: Anwa Hayiyusoh

4 February 2026	Samut Songkhram City (W)	0–1	Thonburi United (W)	Mueang, Nakhon Pathom
16:00 (UTC+7)		Report	Ademola Sodiq Adeyemi 7'	Stadium: Thap Luang United Janded Stadium; Attendance: 101; Referee: Veeraporn Maophaeo; Assistant referees: Chaowalit Poonprasit, Srisuwan Boonnum; Fourth official: Pawara Seejen

2nd leg

4 March 2026	Thonburi United (W)	0–0	Samut Songkhram City (W)	Nong Khaem, Bangkok
15:30 (UTC+7)		Report		Stadium: Thonburi Stadium; Attendance: 370; Referee: Satchukorn Saenchu; Assistant referees: Chaowalit Poonprasit, Phubes Lekpha; Fourth official: Komgrit Ponpasit

4 March 2026	Samut Sakhon City (W)	0–2	PT Satun (S)	Mueang, Samut Sakhon
17:00 (UTC+7)		Report	Caio da Conceição Silva 78'; Pornthep Heemla 87'	Stadium: Stadium of Thailand National Sports University, Samut Sakhon Campus; Attendance: 672; Referee: Peerasan Krataithong; Assistant referees: Binla Preeda, Srisuwan Boonnum; Fourth official: Pawara Seejen

==== Final ====
The final consists of 2 clubs, all advancing as winners from the semi-finals. These clubs include one from the Southern region and one from the Western region. 5 goals were scored in this round.

28 March 2026	PT Satun (S)	3–2	Thonburi United (W)	Thanyaburi, Pathum Thani
18:00 (UTC+7)	Wellerson da Silva Machado Guimarães 21'; Phanthawat Khetchompu 33'; Caio da Conceição Silva 48'	Report; Highlight	Narathip Kruearanya 35'; Tanasrap Srikotapach 79'	Stadium: True BG Stadium; Attendance: 2,223; Referee: Alongkorn Khonwai; Assistant referees: Apichit Nophuan, Natthaphon Mala; Fourth official: Kittichai Huthip

== Tournament statistics ==
=== Top goalscorers ===
Rank	Player	Club	Goals
1	(Brazil) Caio da Conceição Silva	PT Satun	10
2	(Thailand) Worawaran Pholuea	Khon Kaen	8
3	(Thailand) Narathip Kruearanya	Thonburi United	5
4	(Thailand) Chatri Rattanawong	Fleet	4
4	(Brazil) Erick Luis	North Bangkok University	4
4	(Brazil) Diogo Pereira	Samut Sakhon City	4
4	(Nigeria) Ugwuoke Pascal Ozioma	Samut Songkhram City	4

=== Hat-tricks ===
Player	For	Against	Result	Date	Round
(Brazil) João Guimarães	Udon Banjan United (NE)	Surin Khong Chee Mool (NE)	4–0 (A)	6 December 2025	League phase Northeastern region
(Thailand) Worawaran Pholuea^{4}	Khon Kaen (NE)	Surin Khong Chee Mool (NE)	6–0 (H)	14 December 2025	League phase Northeastern region
(Brazil) Caio da Conceição Silva	PT Satun (S)	Muang Trang United (S)	4–0 (H)	24 December 2025	League phase Southern region
(Brazil) Caio da Conceição Silva	PT Satun (S)	Khon Kaen (NE)	4–2 (H)	21 January 2026	Quarter-finals

Notes: ^{4} = Player scored 4 goals; (H) = Home team; (A) = Away team

== See also ==
- 2025–26 Thai League 1
- 2025–26 Thai League 2
- 2025–26 Thai League 3
- 2025–26 Thai League 3 Northern Region
- 2025–26 Thai League 3 Central Region
- 2025–26 Thai League 3 Northeastern Region
- 2025–26 Thai League 3 Eastern Region
- 2025–26 Thai League 3 Western Region
- 2025–26 Thai League 3 Southern Region
- 2025–26 Thai League 3 National Championship
- 2025 Thai U21 League
- 2025–26 Thai FA Cup
- 2025–26 Thai League Cup
