= 2025–26 Thai League 3 Central Region =

Thai League 3 Central Region
- Season: 2025–26
- Dates: 13 September 2025 – 21 March 2026
- Champions: Prime Bangkok
- Relegated: Saraburi United
- T3 National Championship: Prime Bangkok; North Bangkok University
- Matches: 110
- Goals: 317 (2.88 per match)
- Top goalscorer: (Brazil) Célio Guilherme da Silva Santos (13 goals; PTU Pathum Thani)
- Best goalkeeper: (Thailand) Sanan Amkoed (8 clean sheets; North Bangkok University)
- Biggest home win: 7 goals difference Chamchuri United 7–0 Saraburi United (15 March 2026)
- Biggest away win: 5 goals difference Singburi Warriors 0–5 Lopburi City (25 October 2025)
- Highest scoring: 8 goals Angthong 5–3 Lopburi City (9 November 2025); Prime Bangkok 6–2 Saraburi United (28 February 2026)
- Longest winning run: 5 matches Prime Bangkok
- Longest unbeaten run: 18 matches Prime Bangkok
- Longest winless run: 15 matches Saraburi United
- Longest losing run: 6 matches Saraburi United
- Highest attendance: 825; Prime Bangkok 6–2 Saraburi United (28 February 2026)
- Lowest attendance: 50; PTU Pathum Thani 2–1 Chamchuri United (1 November 2025); PTU Pathum Thani 2–1 Kasem Bundit University (15 November 2025)
- Total attendance: 25,853
- Average attendance: 242

The 2025–26 Thai League 3 Central Region was part of the 2025–26 Thai League 3 Regional Stage, consisting of 11 clubs located in the central region of Thailand. The season commenced on 13 September 2025, with clubs competing in a round-robin format featuring home-and-away matches. The Regional Stage concluded on 21 March 2026, with the top two clubs advancing to the National Championship Stage, while the bottom-placed club was relegated to the Thailand Semi-pro League for the following season.

== Seasonal Changes ==
The 2025–26 Thai League 3 season features a number of changes compared to the previous campaign. These include the promotion and relegation of clubs between divisions, several club renamings and rebrandings, and the introduction of a new title sponsor, BYD Auto, which rebranded the competition as the BYD Dolphin League III for sponsorship reasons.

=== Promotions from Thailand Semi-pro League ===
Normally, the champions of each of the six regional groups of the 2025 Thailand Semi-pro League would be promoted to the Thai League 3. However, in the Western region, the champions, The Wall, failed club licensing and were denied promotion. As a result, only five regional champions earned direct promotion, with several additional clubs promoted under special quotas due to licensing issues and adjustments to balance the number of teams in each group. Clubs promotion in the Central region:

- Singburi Warriors – promoted as regional champions.
- Futera United – admitted as third-placed team, after both AUU Inter Bangkok and Dome (Thai League 3 survivors) failed licensing, and runners-up Ayutthaya PK also failed licensing.

=== Clubs relegated due to club licensing failures ===
In addition to the regular relegations, two clubs were demoted from the Thai League 3 Central region after failing to obtain a club licensing certificate for the 2025–26 season.

- AUU Inter Bangkok – failed licensing and were removed from the league.
- Dome – failed licensing; as a consequence, Saraburi United, who finished bottom of the Central region table, retained their place in Thai League 3.

As a result, the lowest-placed side, Saraburi United, was spared relegation.

=== Sponsorship and Broadcasting ===
In the 2025–26 season, Thai League 3 will operate under a title sponsorship arrangement for the first time: BYD Auto (through BYD Rêver Thailand) has become the main sponsor for all three professional tiers in Thailand, including Thai League 3, rebranding it as the BYD Dolphin League III.

On the broadcasting side, a landmark media rights deal was struck, giving AIS Play (in partnership with Gulf and JAS) exclusive rights to stream all matches from Thai Leagues 1, 2, and 3, plus domestic cups and youth competitions for the 2025–26 through 2028–29 seasons. Under this agreement, Thai League 3 matches can be watched live for free via AIS Play, and fans will no longer rely solely on individual clubs' streaming efforts (e.g., via YouTube or Facebook), as they did in previous seasons.

=== Club logo changes ===
2 clubs have changed their logos for the 2025–26 season of the Thai League 3 Central region:

- Royal Thai Air Force, introduced a completely new crest. The previous emblem, which closely resembled the insignia of the Royal Thai Air Force with golden wings, a star, a tricolour shield, and a radiant crown, was replaced by a minimalist and modern design featuring geometric shapes representing wings and a star, with the club's name in Thai "ทหารอากาศ เอฟซี" displayed below.
- Singburi Warriors, a newly promoted club, unveiled a redesigned crest upon their promotion from the Thailand Semi-pro League. The previous emblem featured two red Singha lions facing each other with a football at the center, while the new design simplifies the imagery to a single silver Singha lion alongside a football, set against a two-tone maroon and gold shield with the club's name in a stylized font.

== Teams ==
=== Number of teams by province ===
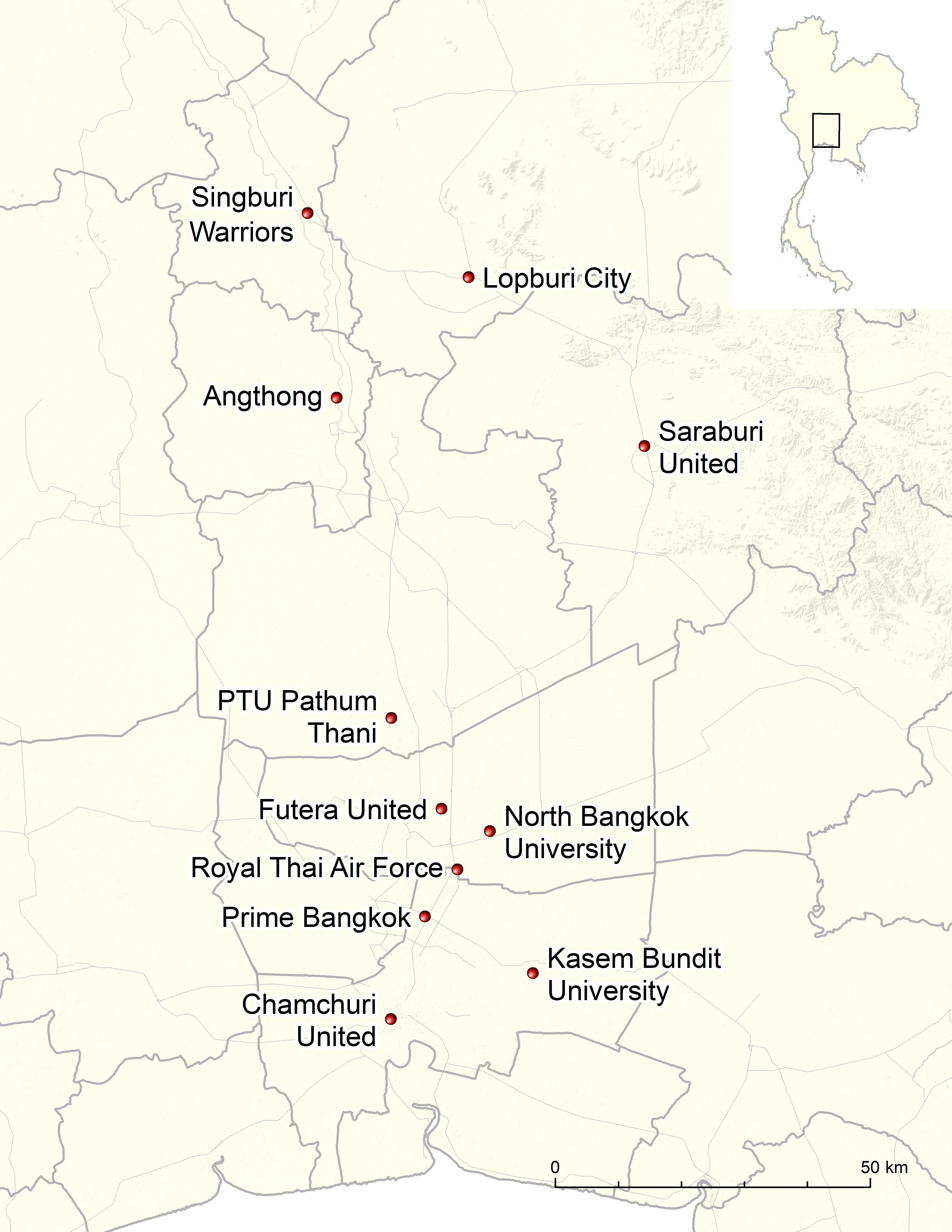
Locations of the 2025–26 Thai League 3 Central Region clubs.

Position	Province	Number	Teams
1	Bangkok	3	Chamchuri United, Kasem Bundit University, and Prime Bangkok
1	Pathum Thani	3	Futera United, North Bangkok University, and Royal Thai Air Force
3	Ang Thong	1	Angthong
3	Lopburi	1	Lopburi City
3	Phra Nakhon Si Ayutthaya	1	PTU Pathum Thani
3	Saraburi	1	Saraburi United
3	Singburi	1	Singburi Warriors

=== Stadiums and locations ===
Team	Location	Stadium	Coordinates
Angthong	Angthong (Mueang)	Angthong Provincial Stadium	14°37′45″N 100°27′07″E
Chamchuri United	Bangkok (Pathum Wan)	Stadium of Chulalongkorn University	13°44′14″N 100°31′33″E
Futera United	Pathum Thani (Khlong Luang)	Stadium of Bangkok University	14°02′19″N 100°36′08″E
Kasem Bundit University	Bangkok (Min Buri)	Stadium of Kasem Bundit University	13°48′06″N 100°44′06″E
Lopburi City	Lopburi (Mueang)	Phra Ramesuan Stadium	14°48′04″N 100°38′52″E
North Bangkok University	Pathum Thani (Thanyaburi)	Stadium of North Bangkok University	14°00′22″N 100°40′24″E
Prime Bangkok	Bangkok (Lak Si)	NT Stadium	13°53′03″N 100°34′37″E
PTU Pathum Thani	Ayutthaya (Bang Sai)	Ratchakram Stadium	14°10′09″N 100°31′45″E
Royal Thai Air Force	Pathum Thani (Lam Luk Ka)	Dhupatemiya Stadium	13°57′04″N 100°37′30″E
Saraburi United	Saraburi (Mueang)	Saraburi Stadium	14°33′24″N 100°54′18″E
Singburi Warriors	Singburi (Mueang)	Singburi PAO. Stadium	14°53′40″N 100°24′39″E

=== Foreign players ===
A T3 team could register 3 foreign players from foreign players all around the world. A team can use 3 foreign players on the field in each game.

Note :
(substituted off) : players who released during second leg transfer window;
(substituted on) : players who registered during second leg transfer window.

AFC member countries players.
CAF member countries players.
CONCACAF member countries players.
CONMEBOL member countries players.
OFC member countries players.
UEFA member countries players.
No foreign player registered.

Club	Leg	Player 1	Player 2	Player 3
Angthong	1st	(Brazil) Erivelto (substituted off)	(Brazil) Erenilson de Carvalho Pereira	(Serbia) Marko Milenkovic
Angthong	2nd	(Japan) Kenta Hara (substituted on)	(Brazil) Erenilson de Carvalho Pereira	(Serbia) Marko Milenkovic
Chamchuri United	1st	(Belgium) Jean Denis Lumbala Tshisaka Bussenu (substituted off)
Chamchuri United	2nd
Futera United	1st	(Nigeria) Oibo Okhai Godspower (substituted off)	(Japan) Tsubasa Kawanishi (substituted off)	(Nigeria) John Owoeri
Futera United	2nd	(South Korea) Park Jae-kyung (substituted on)	(South Korea) Cha Sun-ho (substituted on)	(Nigeria) John Owoeri
Kasem Bundit University	1st	(Iran) Mohammad Osanikord (substituted off)	(South Korea) Park Gwan-woo (substituted off)	(Japan) Sosuke Kimura
Kasem Bundit University	2nd	(Brazil) Matheus Felipe Oliveira de Moraes (substituted on)	(Brazil) Guttiner (substituted on)	(Japan) Sosuke Kimura
Lopburi City	1st	(Ghana) Sani Kamil (substituted off)	(Brazil) Andrey Coutinho	(Ghana) Eric Kumi
Lopburi City	2nd	(Nigeria) Ozobialu Chinedu Kennedy (substituted on)	(Brazil) Andrey Coutinho	(Ghana) Eric Kumi
North Bangkok University	1st	(Brazil) Erick Luis (substituted off)	(South Korea) Kim Bong-jin (substituted off)	(Germany) Jaden Marvin Meyer
North Bangkok University	2nd	(Brazil) Emerson Felipe Alves Peixoto De Almeida (substituted on)	(Finland) Sakari Tukiainen (substituted on)	(Germany) Jaden Marvin Meyer
Prime Bangkok	1st	(Sweden) Alexandar Mutic (substituted off)	(Afghanistan) Omid Popalzay (substituted off)	(Zimbabwe) Victor Kamhuka
Prime Bangkok	2nd	(Brazil) Washington Brandão dos Oliveira (substituted on)	(France) Mabiala Gaël Cedric (substituted on)	(Zimbabwe) Victor Kamhuka
PTU Pathum Thani	1st	(France) Adel Gafaiti (substituted off)	(Japan) Ryo Tomigahara (substituted off)	(Brazil) Célio Guilherme da Silva Santos
PTU Pathum Thani	2nd	(Brazil) Abraão de Sousa Lima (substituted on)	(South Korea) Jung Hyeon-gu (substituted on)	(Brazil) Célio Guilherme da Silva Santos
Royal Thai Air Force	1st		(France) Boungou Kombo Chriss-Alex, Ferriol	(Ghana) Emmanuel Kwame Akadom
Royal Thai Air Force	2nd	(Azerbaijan) Mammad Guliyev (substituted on)	(France) Boungou Kombo Chriss-Alex, Ferriol	(Ghana) Emmanuel Kwame Akadom
Saraburi United	1st	(England) Karam Idris (substituted off)	(South Korea) Shin Kwan-hoon (substituted off)	(South Korea) Cha Sun-ho (substituted off)
Saraburi United	2nd		(Japan) Kaneiki Hiroto (substituted on)	(South Korea) Joseph Cho (substituted on)
Singburi Warriors	1st	(Egypt) Basam Radwan Mahmoud Mohamed Afify (substituted off)	(United States) Christian Joseph Sacchini (substituted off)	(Iran) Amirmohammad Karamdar
Singburi Warriors	2nd	(Egypt) Abdelrahman Osama Mohamed (substituted on)	(Japan) Yuto Yoshijima (substituted on)	(Iran) Amirmohammad Karamdar

== League table ==
=== Standings ===
Pos	Team	Pld	W	D	L	GF	GA	GD	Pts	Qualification or relegation
1	Prime Bangkok (C, Q)	20	14	5	1	47	14	+33	47	Qualification to the National Championship stage
2	North Bangkok University (Q)	20	11	4	5	29	16	+13	37	Qualification to the National Championship stage
3	PTU Pathum Thani	20	10	6	4	31	28	+3	36 (Note: PTU Pathum Thani ahead on head-to-head points record; PTU Pathum Thani 4 pts, Royal Thai Air Force 1 pt.)	
4	Royal Thai Air Force	20	11	3	6	28	20	+8	36	
5	Angthong	20	10	4	6	31	21	+10	34	
6	Chamchuri United	20	8	4	8	33	26	+7	28 (Note: Chamchuri United ahead on head-to-head points record; Chamchuri United 6 pts, Kasem Bundit University 0 pts.)	
7	Kasem Bundit University	20	7	7	6	26	26	0	28	
8	Futera United	20	4	5	11	27	35	−8	17	
9	Lopburi City	20	2	9	9	28	40	−12	15	
10	Singburi Warriors	20	3	5	12	18	41	−23	14	
11	Saraburi United (R)	20	2	4	14	19	50	−31	10	Relegation to the Thailand Semi-pro League

Source: Thai League
Rules for classification: 1) Points; 2) Head-to-head points; 3) Head-to-head goal difference; 4) Head-to-head goal scored; 5) Overall goal difference; 6) Overall goal scored; 7) Fair play points; 8) Play-off without extra time).
(C) Champions; (Q) Qualified for the phase indicated; (R) Relegated

=== Positions by round ===
Team ╲ Round	1	2	3	4	5	6	7	8	9	10	11	12	13	14	15	16	17	18	19	20	21	22
Prime Bangkok	7	8	6	4	2	3	1	1	2	1	2	1	1	1	1	1	1	1	1	1	1	1
North Bangkok University	9	7	1	1	1	2	3	3	3	2	3	3	2	2	2	2	2	2	2	2	2	2
PTU Pathum Thani	4	1	3	5	3	1	2	2	1	3	1	2	4	3	3	4	4	3	3	3	3	3
Royal Thai Air Force	2	5	2	6	6	4	5	5	6	4	4	4	3	4	4	3	3	4	4	4	4	4
Angthong	1	2	4	7	7	7	6	6	4	5	5	5	6	6	6	6	6	6	6	6	5	5
Chamchuri United	3	4	5	3	5	6	4	4	5	6	6	7	7	7	7	8	8	8	7	7	7	6
Kasem Bundit University	8	6	8	2	4	5	7	7	7	7	7	6	5	5	5	5	5	5	5	5	6	7
Futera United	10	10	11	11	11	10	10	10	10	9	9	8	9	8	8	7	7	7	8	8	8	8
Lopburi City	5	9	9	9	8	8	8	8	8	8	8	9	8	9	9	9	9	9	9	10	9	9
Singburi Warriors	11	11	10	10	10	11	11	11	11	11	11	11	11	11	11	10	10	10	10	9	10	10
Saraburi United	6	3	7	8	9	9	9	9	9	10	10	10	10	10	10	11	11	11	11	11	11	11

Source: Thai League
= Qualification to the National Championship stage; = Relegation to the Thailand Semi-pro League

=== Results by round ===
Team ╲ Round	1	2	3	4	5	6	7	8	9	10	11	12	13	14	15	16	17	18	19	20	21	22
Prime Bangkok	N	D	W	W	W	D	W	W	D	W	D	W	W	W	W	W	D	W	W	L	W	N
North Bangkok University	L	W	W	D	W	D	L	W	W	W	N	L	W	W	W	L	D	W	W	L	N	D
PTU Pathum Thani	W	W	L	D	W	W	N	W	W	D	W	L	L	W	W	L	N	W	D	D	D	D
Royal Thai Air Force	W	L	W	L	D	W	D	N	L	W	W	W	W	L	W	W	L	N	D	L	W	W
Angthong	W	D	L	D	N	D	W	D	W	L	W	L	L	L	N	W	W	L	W	W	W	W
Chamchuri United	W	N	D	W	L	D	W	L	D	L	W	N	L	L	L	L	D	L	W	W	W	W
Kasem Bundit University	L	W	D	W	D	N	D	D	L	D	D	W	W	W	L	N	W	W	L	D	L	L
Futera United	L	L	L	L	D	D	L	D	N	W	L	W	L	W	W	D	D	L	N	L	L	L
Lopburi City	D	L	D	D	D	D	W	L	L	N	L	L	W	L	L	D	D	L	L	N	D	D
Singburi Warriors	L	L	D	N	L	L	L	D	D	L	L	D	L	N	L	W	D	W	L	W	L	L
Saraburi United	D	W	N	L	L	L	L	L	D	L	L	D	N	L	L	L	L	L	L	W	L	D

Source: Thai League
N = No match; W = Won; D = Drawn; L = Lost

=== Results ===
Home \ Away	ATG	CCU	FTU	KBU	LBC	NBU	PBK	PTU	AIR	SRU	SBW
Angthong	—	2–2	2–1	0–0	5–3	2–1	1–1	0–1	1–2	2–0	4–0
Chamchuri United	0–1	—	2–1	2–1	0–1	3–1	1–2	0–2	1–2	7–0	2–0
Futera United	0–1	2–0	—	1–1	2–2	0–3	1–1	2–1	0–2	5–2	1–1
Kasem Bundit University	1–0	0–2	0–1	—	2–1	0–2	1–1	1–1	2–2	4–2	3–1
Lopburi City	0–1	2–2	3–3	1–4	—	0–1	0–1	1–1	2–2	1–1	3–3
North Bangkok University	2–1	2–2	2–1	2–1	0–0	—	1–1	0–1	0–2	4–0	1–0
Prime Bangkok	1–0	2–1	3–1	4–0	6–0	1–0	—	6–0	3–0	6–2	2–0
PTU Pathum Thani	2–2	2–1	4–3	2–2	3–1	0–0	2–3	—	0–0	4–2	1–0
Royal Thai Air Force	4–2	1–2	2–1	0–1	1–0	0–1	0–1	1–2	—	1–0	2–1
Saraburi United	0–2	1–2	1–0	0–1	2–2	0–2	1–1	1–2	0–1	—	2–1
Singburi Warriors	0–2	1–1	2–1	1–1	0–5	1–4	2–1	2–0	0–3	2–2	—

Source: Thai League
Legend: Blue = home team win; Yellow = draw; Red = away team win.
For upcoming matches, an "a" indicates there is an article about the rivalry between the two participants.
