= PTU Pathum Thani F.C. =

Thai football club

- Full name: PTU Pathum Thani Football Club (สโมสรฟุตบอลพีทียู ปทุมธานี)
- Nicknames: The Royal lotus (ทีมบัวหลวง)
- Founded: 2012; 14 years ago as name Seeker-Futera Football Club (สโมสรฟุตบอลซีคเคอร์-ฟุตเทร่า)
- Ground: Ratchakram Stadium; Ayutthaya, Thailand
- Capacity: 1,000
- Owner(s): PTU Sport Corporation Co., Ltd.
- Chairman: Dr.Trirong Yueyong
- Head Coach: Kantawat Suwanphayakoon
- League: Thai League 3
- 2025–26: Thai League 3, 3rd of 11 in the Central region

PTU Pathum Thani Football Club (Thai สโมสรฟุตบอลพีทียู ปทุมธานี), is a Thai professional football club under the stewardship of Pathumthani University based in Ayutthaya. The club was founded in 2012. The club is currently playing in the Thai League 3 Western region.

== History ==
In 2022, Pathumthani University competed in the Thai League 3 for the 2022–23 season. It is their 10th season in the professional league. The club started the season with a 0–1 home defeat to Lopburi City and they ended the season with a 3–2 away win over Lopburi City. The club has finished 7th place in the league of the Western region. In addition, in the 2022–23 Thai League Cup Pathumthani University was defeated 2–3 by Lopburi City in the second qualification round, causing them to be eliminated.

== Stadium and locations ==
Coordinates	Location	Stadium	Year
14°02′06″N 100°43′21″E	Pathum Thani	Rajamangala University of Technology Thanyaburi Satadium	2013
13°46′40″N 100°38′41″E	Bangkok	National Housing Authority Stadium (Klongchan Stadium)	2014
13°52′02″N 100°34′39″E	Bang Khen, Bangkok	Boonyachinda Stadium	2014
14°08′00″N 100°36′26″E	Pathum Thani	Valaya Alongkorn Rajabhat University Stadium	2015–2016
13°52′02″N 100°34′39″E	Bang Khen, Bangkok	Boonyachinda Stadium	2017
14°10′09″N 100°31′44″E	Phra Nakhon Si Ayutthaya	Ratchakram Stadium	2018–present

== Season by season record ==
Season	League									FA Cup	League Cup	T3 Cup	Top goalscorer	
Season	Division	P	W	D	L	F	A	Pts	Pos	FA Cup	League Cup	T3 Cup	Name	Goals
2013	Central-West	24	10	7	7	38	30	37	4th	Opted out	Opted out			
2014	Central-West	26	4	6	16	29	55	18	14th	R2	Opted out			
2015	Central-West	24	5	6	13	19	47	21	10th	R2	R2			
2016	Central	20	6	5	9	17	24	23	7th	R1	Opted out			
2017	T4 Bangkok	30	9	11	10	35	35	38	7th	Opted out	Opted out		(Brazil) Cardozo Jonathan Ricardo Ezequiel (Thailand) Nopparat Mungngam	6
2018	T4 Bangkok	22	8	11	3	27	19	35	5th	Opted out	Opted out			
2019	T4 Bangkok	24	15	7	2	49	23	52	3rd	Opted out	Opted out		(United States) Diego Barrera	9
2020–21	T3 West	17	6	2	9	14	23	20	7th	Opted out	Opted out		(Ivory Coast) Soumahoro Mafa Ivoirienne	4
2021–22	T3 West	20	10	9	1	30	13	39	2nd	R1	QR2		(Brazil) Giuberty Silva Neves	13
2022–23	T3 West	22	8	4	10	31	32	28	7th	Opted out	QR2		(Thailand) Kerkkert Nimura, (Thailand) Natthawut Sukaram, (Thailand) Panupong Hawan	4
2023–24	T3 West	20	12	6	2	51	16	42	1st	Opted out	QR2	R1	(Ghana) Eric Kumi	20
2024–25	T3 Central	20	7	4	9	17	29	25	6th	Opted out	QR2	LP	(Thailand) Anooruk Suepsunthon	4
2025–26	T3 Central	20	10	6	4	31	28	36	3rd	Opted out	QRP	LP	(Brazil) Célio Guilherme da Silva Santos	14
2026–27	T3 Central										QR1			

Champions	Runners-up	Promoted	Relegated

== Players ==
=== Current squad ===
As of 1 October 2024

Note: Flags indicate national team as defined under FIFA eligibility rules; some limited exceptions apply. Players may hold more than one non-FIFA nationality.

No.	Pos.	Nation	Player
3	MF	GHA	Eric Kumi
7	MF	THA	Natthawut Sukaram
8	FW	JPN	Ryo Tomigahara
9	MF	THA	Prasit Pattanatanawisut
10	MF	THA	Bundit Paponpai
14	DF	THA	Thanaphum Nirutmon
15	DF	THA	Methapon Monyai
17	DF	THA	Panupong Hawan
18	MF	THA	Kittidet Thaeptham
19	FW	THA	Kerkkert Nimura
20	FW	THA	Krungthep Chaweepak
21	MF	THA	Sahapab Suwannagoot
22	FW	THA	Anooruk Suepsunthon

No.	Pos.	Nation	Player
24	DF	CIV	Henri Jöel
26	GK	THA	Thitikorn Wiyawattana
30	GK	THA	Kititad Khamkaew
37	DF	THA	Tanongsak Vongthom
38	GK	THA	Kitsana Lueadsantia
39	MF	THA	Rattanan Raman
44	MF	THA	Takoon Amphan
55	DF	THA	Chuthidech Pahwong
65	MF	THA	Rrailas Panyaroj
66	DF	THA	Artid Wongwain
77	DF	THA	Nattapon Saensombat
78	DF	THA	Woraphon Waeokhao
88	MF	THA	Atiphon Noree

== Coaching staff ==
Position	Name
Manager	(Thailand) Woraphan Tunton
Assistant coach	(Thailand) Ronakorn Tangsri
Assistant coach	
Assistant coach	
Assistant coach	
Goalkeeper coach	
Assistant Goalkeeper Coach	
Fitness coach	
First Team Physical Performance Coach	
Professional Development Coach	
First team Physiotherapist	

== Honours ==
=== Domestic leagues ===
- Thai League 3 Western Region
  - Winners (1): 2023–24
