= Rachan Prasitthong =

Thai footballer (born 1999)

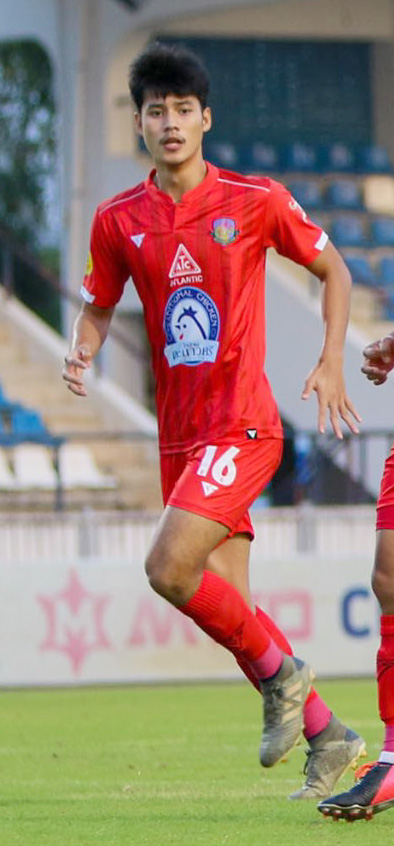

Personal information
- Full name: Rachan Prasitthong
- Date of birth: 7 March 1999 (age 27)
- Place of birth: Bangkok, Thailand
- Height: 1.84 m (6 ft 1/2 in)
- Position: Defensive midfielder

Team information
- Current team: Phrae United
- Number: 57

Youth career
- 2012–2014: Phattharaborphit School
- 2015–2017: Leicester City

Senior career*
Years	Team	Apps	(Gls)
2017–2019	Police Tero	3	(0)
2019–2020	Nakhon Ratchasima	6	(0)
2020–2021	Kasetsart	8	(0)
2021	Ranong United	3	(0)
2021–2022	Rajpracha	6	(0)
2022	Samut Sakhon City	9	(0)
2023–2024	Krabi	22	(0)
2024–2025	Lopburi City	4	(0)
2025	Chanthaburi	0	(0)
2026–	Phrae United	0	(0)
- * Club domestic league appearances and goals as of 1 April 2026

Rachan Prasitthong (ราชัน ประสิทธิทอง, born March 7, 1999) is a Thai professional footballer who currently plays for Phrae United in the Thai League 2.
