= Futera United F.C. =

Futera United ฟูเทร่า ยูไนเต็ด
- Full name: Futera United Football Club
- Nicknames: Futera (ฟูเทร่า)
- Founded: 2021; 5 years ago
- Ground: Bangkok University Rangsit Campus; Khlong Luang, Pathum Thani
- Capacity: 5,000
- Coordinates: 13°43′49″N 100°46′20″E
- Head coach: Pissanu Suwannaprom
- League: Thai League 3
- 2025–26: Thai League 3, 8th of 11 (Central region)

Futera United Football Club (Thai สโมสรฟุตบอล ฟูเทร่า ยูไนเต็ด), is a Thai professional football club based in Khlong Luang, Pathum Thani province. The club is currently playing in the Thai League 3, Central region. Futera United was founded in 2021.

== Stadiums and locations ==
Coordinates	Location	Stadium	Year
13°43′49″N 100°46′20″E	Lat Krabang, Bangkok	Stadium of King Mongkut's Institute of Technology Ladkrabang	2021 – 2024
14°02′19″N 100°36′08″E	Khlong Luang, Pathum Thani	Stadium of Bangkok University	2025 – present

== Season by season record ==
Season	League									FA Cup	League Cup	T3 Cup	Top goalscorer	
Season	Division	P	W	D	L	F	A	Pts	Pos	FA Cup	League Cup	T3 Cup	Name	Goals
2025–26	T3 Central	20	4	5	11	27	35	17	8th	QR	QR2	LP	(Nigeria) John Owoeri	6

Champions	Runners-up	Promoted	Relegated

== Players ==
Note: Flags indicate national team as defined under FIFA eligibility rules; some limited exceptions apply. Players may hold more than one non-FIFA nationality.

No.	Pos.	Nation	Player
1	GK	THA	Muhammadromsan Make
2	DF	THA	Wachiraphol Thaphiran
3	DF	MYA	Zaw Min Tun
4	DF	THA	Khwanchai Khuannam
7	FW	THA	Kawee Deesawat
8	MF	THA	Woraphon Prachanban
9	FW	THA	Phatsakon Fukfang
10	MF	THA	Chonlakorn Janjamsai
11	FW	THA	Puripat Siriwat
12	DF	THA	Wachiranon Ruengdach
14	MF	THA	Chaisri Wongsa
16	DF	THA	Rachan Prasitthong
17	FW	THA	Paroonrit Singnon
18	FW	THA	Phatsakon Fukfang

No.	Pos.	Nation	Player
21	DF	THA	Piyangkun Phopparat
22	FW	THA	Chaisiri Wongsa
23	FW	THA	Pharuahat Chanpaisanslip
24	DF	THA	Tewit KruengWong
25	MF	THA	Thanakorn Intub
26	MF	THA	Songkhun Khongsukko
27	FW	NGA	Okhai Godspower Oibo
29	DF	THA	Niphitphon Saengsuk
32	DF	THA	Chakrit Sibram
39	MF	JPN	Tsubasa Kawanishi
44	FW	THA	Pharanyu Sawatphakdee
66	DF	THA	Nattawut Jandit
77	GK	THA	Khacen Janluechai
89	MF	THA	Sarawin Sungkhao
99	GK	THA	Padchaya Panya

== Former players ==
- (Saint Kitts and Nevis) Tishan Hanley
- (Thailand) Sarawut Masuk
- (Thailand) Itthiphon Yotphrom
- (Nigeria) Thompson Ekpe
- (Nigeria) John Owoeri

== Club staff ==
Position	Staff
Director of football	(Thailand) Pisal Rumrai
Head coach	(Thailand) Pissanu Suwannaprom
Assistant coach	(Thailand) Rawidech Preuksachat
Media manager	(Thailand) Tanadon Nueangpanom
