= Royal Thai Air Force F.C. =

Royal Thai Air Force ทหารอากาศ
- Full name: Royal Thai Air Force Football Club
- Nicknames: The Air Force (ทัพฟ้า)
- Founded: 1985; 41 years ago
- Ground: Thupatemi Stadium; Pathum Thani, Thailand
- Capacity: 25,000
- Coordinates: 13°57′04″N 100°37′30″E
- Owner(s): Directorate of Welfare, Royal Thai Air Force
- Chairman: Totsapon Naethan
- Head coach: Montree Praephan
- League: Thai League 3
- 2025–26: Thai League 3, 4th of 11 in the Central region

Royal Thai Air Force Football Club (Thai สโมสรฟุตบอลทหารอากาศ), is a Thai professional football club under the stewardship of Royal Thai Air Force based in Lamlukka, Pathum Thani, Thailand. The club is currently playing in the Thai League 3 Central region.

== History ==
In 2019, the club was established and competed in the 2019 Thailand Amateur League Bangkok metropolitan region, using the Thupatemi Stadium as the ground. At the end of the season, they have promoted to the 2020 Thai League 4.

In 2020, the club became a professional football club and competed in the Thai League 4. However, the Football Association of Thailand merged the Thai League 3 and Thai League 4. As a result of this incident, all teams in Thai League 4 were promoted to Thai League 3. The club competed in the Thai League 3 for the 2020–21 season. In late December 2020, the Coronavirus disease 2019 or also known as COVID-19 had spread again in Thailand, the FA Thailand must abruptly end the regional stage of the Thai League 3. The club has finished the eleventh place of the Bangkok metropolitan region.

In 2021, the 2021–22 season is the second consecutive season in the Thai League 3 of Royal Thai Air Force. They started the season with a 0–2 home defeated to North Bangkok University and they ended the season with a 0–1 away defeated to the North Bangkok University. The club has finished tenth place in the league of the Bangkok metropolitan region.

In 2022, Royal Thai Air Force competed in the Thai League 3 for the 2022–23 season. It is their 3rd season in the professional league. The club started the season with a 1–0 away win over Royal Thai Army and they ended the season with a 3–1 home win over Royal Thai Army. The club has finished 13th place in the league of the Bangkok metropolitan region.

== Stadium and locations ==
Coordinates	Location	Stadium	Year
13°57′04″N 100°37′30″E	Khu Khot, Lamlukka, Pathum Thani	Thupatemi Stadium	2019 – present

== Season by season record ==
Season	League									FA Cup	League Cup	T3 Cup	Top goalscorer	
Season	Division	P	W	D	L	F	A	Pts	Pos	FA Cup	League Cup	T3 Cup	Name	Goals
2019	TA Bangkok	3	3	0	0	9	5	9	1st	Opted out	Ineligible			
2020–21	T3 Bangkok	20	5	3	12	19	43	18	11th	Opted out	QR2		(Thailand) Nattapon Srisamut	5
2021–22	T3 Bangkok	26	8	7	11	23	30	31	10th	Opted out	Opted out		(Thailand) Nattapon Srisamut (Thailand) Thitiwut Ngamprom	3
2022–23	T3 Bangkok	26	4	9	13	31	49	21	13th	Opted out	Opted out		(Thailand) Jakkapong Polmart	13
2023–24	T3 Bangkok	26	8	6	12	41	47	30	7th	Opted out	Opted out	Opted out	(England) Karam Idris (Thailand) Peerawat Rarang	9
2024–25	T3 Central	20	5	10	5	22	21	25	5th	Opted out	Opted out	Opted out	(Ghana) Emmanuel Kwame Akadom, (Thailand) Sittirak Kerdkhumthong	5
2025–26	T3 Central	20	11	3	6	28	20	36	4th	Opted out	Opted out	R16	(France) Boungou Kombo Chriss-Alex, Ferriol	7

Champions	Runners-up	Promoted	Relegated

- P = Played
- W = Games won
- D = Games drawn
- L = Games lost
- F = Goals for
- A = Goals against
- Pts = Points
- Pos = Final position
- QR1 = First Qualifying Round
- QR2 = Second Qualifying Round
- R1 = Round 1
- R2 = Round 2
- R3 = Round 3
- R4 = Round 4
- R5 = Round 5
- R6 = Round 6
- QF = Quarter-finals
- SF = Semi-finals
- RU = Runners-up
- W = Winners

== Players ==
=== Current squad ===
As of 1 October 2024

Note: Flags indicate national team as defined under FIFA eligibility rules; some limited exceptions apply. Players may hold more than one non-FIFA nationality.

No.	Pos.	Nation	Player
4	DF	KOR	Seo Young-hoon
5	MF	THA	Watcharin Sombatwattanakul
7	FW	THA	Ratchapol Ditchunlaka
8	DF	THA	Teerasak Oomnok
10	MF	GHA	Emmanuel Kwame Akadom
11	FW	THA	Peerathat Prapun
12	MF	THA	Napat Koedsombat
13	DF	THA	Patikorn Saetia
14	FW	THA	Piyapat Suksai
15	FW	THA	Chonnatee Nettong
17	MF	THA	Saengthong Vichean
18	MF	THA	Shinnawut Thanomsingha
19	MF	THA	Witchachan Chomchuen
21	MF	THA	Rapeepat Nakphet
22	DF	THA	Adison Sriburom
23	FW	GHA	Benjamin Sah

No.	Pos.	Nation	Player
30	GK	THA	Panuwat Sangwanngoen
33	DF	THA	Sonthaya Saengdaeng
36	DF	THA	Nattapat Sutthakorn
37	MF	THA	Peerawat Rarang
39	MF	THA	Tayasit Manjit
44	DF	THA	Tanakrit Hansantia
45	MF	THA	Natthapong Bupasiri
58	DF	THA	Thummada Kokyai
62	GK	THA	Wichanon Chomchuen
66	FW	THA	Tanupat Boonanan
67	GK	THA	Thanakon Phomilbut
68	GK	THA	Kittisak Thongkam
70	MF	THA	Sittirak Kerdkhumthong
74	MF	THA	Burapha Suwanrussamee
77	MF	THA	Tanakit Rodwinit
