= Singburi Warriors F.C. =

Singburi Warriors สิงห์บุรี วอร์ริเออร์
- Full name: Singburi Warriors Football Club
- Nicknames: Singha City Warriors (นักรบเมืองสิงห์)
- Founded: 2025; 1 year ago
- Ground: Singburi PAO. Stadium; Singburi, Thailand
- Capacity: 2,500
- Coordinates: 14°53′40″N 100°24′39″E
- Owner(s): Singburi Warrior Co., Ltd.
- Chairman: Thanaphon Udommansiriphaisan
- Head coach: Alongkorn Thong-am
- League: Thai League 3
- 2025–26: Thai League 3, 10th of 11 in the Central region
- Website: Facebook

Singburi Warriors Football Club (Thai: สโมสรฟุตบอล สิงห์บุรี วอร์ริเออร์) is a Thai professional football club based in Singburi, Thailand. The club currently competes in the Thai League 3 Central region, the third tier of the Thai football league system.

== History ==
Singburi Warriors Football Club was founded in 2025 and entered the 2025 Thailand Semi-pro League, a national qualifying competition organized by the Football Association of Thailand. The club won the Central region title in its inaugural season, securing automatic promotion to the 2025–26 Thai League 3 Central Region.

Ahead of the 2025–26 season, the club introduced a new logo and appointed Parinya Jaruhaeti as head coach. Kongphop Songkrasin, the father of Thailand national team player Chanathip Songkrasin, was also appointed as the club's technical director. During the pre-season period, Singburi Warriors signed Piyakit Eangprayoon to strengthen the squad for their first professional campaign. However, during the early stage of the Thai League 3 campaign, the club parted ways with Parinya Jaruhaeti following a series of unsatisfactory results.

== Stadium and locations ==
Coordinates	Location	Stadium	Year
14°53′40″N 100°24′39″E	Mueang, Singburi	Singburi PAO. Stadium	2025 – present

== Season by season record ==
Season	League									FA Cup	League Cup	T3 Cup	Top goalscorer	
Season	Division	P	W	D	L	F	A	Pts	Pos	FA Cup	League Cup	T3 Cup	Name	Goals
2025	TS Central	6	4	2	0	11	3	14	1st	Opted out	Ineligible	Ineligible	(Thailand) Kamon Maninuan, (Thailand) Narongrit Muangwong, (Thailand) Patiphan Chosunthon, (Thailand) Songkhun Khongsukko, (Thailand) Tanakorn Ketkanjano	2
2025–26	T3 Central	20	3	5	12	18	41	14	10th	QR	QR2	LP	(Thailand) Jiraaut Wingwon (Japan) Yuto Yoshijima	4

Champions	Runners-up	Promoted	Relegated

- P = Played
- W = Games won
- D = Games drawn
- L = Games lost
- F = Goals for
- A = Goals against
- Pts = Points
- Pos = Final position
- QR1 = First Qualifying Round
- QR2 = Second Qualifying Round
- R1 = Round 1
- R2 = Round 2
- R3 = Round 3
- R4 = Round 4
- R5 = Round 5
- R6 = Round 6
- QF = Quarter-finals
- SF = Semi-finals
- RU = Runners-up
- W = Winners

== Players ==
=== Current squad ===
As of 22 October 2025

Note: Flags indicate national team as defined under FIFA eligibility rules; some limited exceptions apply. Players may hold more than one non-FIFA nationality.

No.	Pos.	Nation	Player
4	FW	THA	Naphat Rajanpan
5	DF	IRN	Amirmohammad Karamdar
7	MF	THA	Jiraaut Wingwon
8	DF	THA	Alongkorn Thongjean
9	FW	THA	Ilham Ibrohing
10	DF	THA	Suriya Pongprung
11	FW	THA	Kamon Maninuan
13	DF	USA	Christian Joseph Sacchini
14	MF	THA	Keattisak Sanitkham
15	MF	THA	Chaiyasan Homboon
16	MF	THA	Weerapat Unpak
17	MF	THA	Teerayut Jaimun
18	GK	THA	Vitit Nirunrit
20	MF	THA	Chaiwat Naknen
21	DF	THA	Mekin Wae-U-seng
22	FW	THA	Pongbanchon Tognam

No.	Pos.	Nation	Player
23	DF	THA	Kanokpon Udomsakunee
24	MF	THA	Nattapon Ongpanich
25	GK	THA	Natdanai Karnsomsup
26	DF	THA	Rachakarn Kamolpromwong
27	GK	THA	Natthawut Thaongoen
28	FW	THA	Sattrawut Auppachai
29	FW	THA	Thanaphon Udommansiriphaisan
30	GK	THA	Prapat Yoskrai
32	FW	THA	Chanayut Jejue
36	GK	THA	Chanachai Sangdech
45	MF	THA	Anucha Sodsri
47	DF	THA	Rachata Tongdonpum
51	DF	THA	Passakorn Soonthonchuen
63	DF	THA	Anuchart Yoskrai (captain)
81	MF	THA	Pongsiri Sookrod
96	FW	EGY	Basam Radwan Mahmoud Mohamed Afify
97	FW	THA	Nitiphon Prombut
