= North Bangkok University F.C. =

Thailand football club

North Bangkok University
- Full name: North Bangkok University Football Club
- Nicknames: The Horsemen (อาชาผยอง)
- Founded: 2006; 20 years ago
- Ground: North Bangkok University Stadium (Rangsit); Pathum Thani, Thailand
- Capacity: 3,000
- Owner(s): North Bangkok Sports Club Co., Ltd.
- Chairman: Pattama Roopsuwankul
- Head coach: Damrongsak Boonmuang
- League: Thai League 3
- 2025–26: Thai League 3, 2nd of 11 in the Central region
Home colours	Away colours

North Bangkok University Football Club (Thai: สโมสรฟุตบอลมหาวิทยาลัยนอร์ทกรุงเทพ) is a Thailand football club under the stewardship of the North Bangkok University based in Pathum Thani. The club currently plays in the Thai League 3 Bangkok metropolitan region.

== History ==
Their first season in the 2010 Thai Division 2 League Bangkok & field Region almost proved successful. A victory in their last game over Bangkok F.C. would have earned North Bangkok College a top-two finish and a chance to enter the 2010 Regional League Division 2 playoffs. North Bangkok College were leading Bangkok F.C. 1–0 in their final game but with 15 minutes left to play, Bangkok F.C. equalized to earn a 1–1 draw and at the same time clinched top place in the league. North Bangkok College finished 5th in the table.

In 2011, the club finished as runner-up to Kasetsart in the Bangkok Division 2 and qualified for the Division 2 playoffs. The timing of the playoffs coincided with the 2011 floods so the Horsemen were forced to seek alternative home venues as theirs was flooded. It did not bode well as North Bangkok only won one game and collected six points.

In the following season, North Bangkok could not regain their 2011 form and finished 6th in the Bangkok league. In the 2017 season, they made history for the club by winning the Thai League 4.

In 2022, North Bangkok University competed in the Thai League 3 for the 2022–23 season. It is their 13th season in the professional league. The club started the season with a 1–0 home win over AUU Inter Bangkok and they ended the season with a 0–0 away draw with AUU Inter Bangkok. The club has finished 1st place in the league of the Bangkok metropolitan region and advanced to the national championship stage.

== Stadium and locations ==
Coordinates	Location	Stadium	Capacity	Year
14°02′19″N 100°36′08″E	Pathum Thani	Bangkok University Stadium	5,000	2009
13°50′56″N 100°35′50″E	Bang Khen, Bangkok	Infantry Department 11 Royal Guard	?	2010
13°55′10″N 100°41′25″E	Pathum Thani	Thanarom Village Football Field	?	2010
13°48′07″N 100°47′27″E	Min Buri, Bangkok	72nd Anniversary Stadium (Min buri)	8,500	2010
14°02′19″N 100°36′08″E	Pathum Thani	Bangkok University Stadium	5,000	2010
14°00′22″N 100°40′23″E	Pathum Thani	North Bangkok University Stadium (Rangsit)	3,000	2011–2017

== Honours ==
=== Domestic leagues ===
- Thai League 3 Bangkok Metropolitan Region
  - Winners (3): 2020–21, 2021–22, 2022–23
- Thai League 4 Bangkok Metropolitan Region
  - Winners (2): 2017, 2018

== Season by season record ==
Season	League									FA Cup	League Cup	T3 Cup	Top goalscorer	
Season	Division	P	W	D	L	F	A	Pts	Pos	FA Cup	League Cup	T3 Cup	Name	Goals
2010	Bangkok	24	13	6	5	41	28	45	5th	Opted out	Opted out			
2011	Bangkok	30	19	3	8	50	19	60	2nd	Opted out	Opted out			
2012	Bangkok	34	15	13	6	61	46	58	6th	Opted out	Opted out			
2013	Bangkok	26	9	8	9	36	34	35	8th	Opted out	Opted out			
2014	Bangkok	26	11	6	9	31	22	39	8th	Opted out	Opted out			
2015	Bangkok	26	6	10	10	26	31	28	11th	Opted out	Opted out			
2016	Bangkok	20	5	8	7	23	23	23	7th	Opted out	QR1			
2017	T4 Bangkok	30	15	11	4	50	27	56	1st	Opted out	Opted out		(Thailand) Sirichai Lamphuttha	13
2018	T4 Bangkok	22	17	3	2	41	14	51	1st	Opted out	Opted out		(Brazil) Joao Francisco	14
2019	T3 Lower	26	10	10	6	29	20	40	5th	Opted out	QR1		(Thailand) Piyapong Homkhajohn	4
2020–21	T3 Bangkok	20	14	4	2	39	10	46	1st	Opted out	Opted out		(Thailand) Chanotaj Pipatmongkonchai	7
2021–22	T3 Bangkok	26	15	8	3	41	13	53	1st	Opted out	Opted out		(Thailand) Thitiwat Phranmaen	9
2022–23	T3 Bangkok	26	15	8	3	39	16	53	1st	Opted out	Opted out		(Thailand) Veeraphong Aon-pean	7
2023–24	T3 Bangkok	26	17	6	3	44	17	57	2nd	Opted out	Opted out	R2	(Thailand) Phitchanon Chanlung, (Thailand) Pheemphapob Viriyachanchai, (Thailand) Veeraphong Aon-pean	9
2024–25	T3 Central	20	11	8	1	35	14	41	2nd	Opted out	Opted out	LP	(Thailand) Veeraphong Aon-pean	12
2025–26	T3 Central	20	11	4	5	29	16	37	2nd	Opted out	QR1	LP	(Brazil) Erick Luis	8

Champions	Runners-up	Promoted	Relegated

== Current squad ==
As of 1 July 2026

Note: Flags indicate national team as defined under FIFA eligibility rules; some limited exceptions apply. Players may hold more than one non-FIFA nationality.

No.	Pos.	Nation	Player
1	GK	THA	Khatsiam Mungkood
2	DF	THA	Pongpon Nontanum
4	MF	THA	Natpakhan Promthongmee
5	DF	THA	Chaiyarat Phumrod
6	MF	KOR	Kim Joung-ho
7	FW	KOR	Yoo Byung-soo
8	MF	THA	Tanapat Phimol
10	MF	THA	Thirayu Banhan
11	MF	THA	David Bernard Henri Darbellay
12	DF	THA	Phatiphan Chaloensri
13	FW	THA	Chinnawat Pasuk
15	MF	THA	Noppavit Tomyim (Captain)
17	FW	THA	Phasagorn Promhong
18	GK	THA	Sanan Amkoed
19	DF	THA	Theerapong Jongnok

No.	Pos.	Nation	Player
20	MF	THA	Kritsanapong In-on
21	DF	THA	Aphidet Phumanao
22	DF	THA	Panomporn Puangmalei
23	MF	THA	Watthanachai Nantavichianrit
25	GK	THA	Kajbandit Pokaew
26	DF	THA	Saranyu Mangsa
27	DF	THA	Jirapol Saelio
28	GK	THA	Phakin Jobde
29	FW	THA	Apirak Chinket
30	MF	THA	Thanaphat Wasu
34	MF	THA	Nattapat Phoun
35	DF	THA	Nattapat Onjan
37	FW	THA	Natthakit Aiamiaoo
40	FW	THA	Phiraphat Khwanphlu
44	FW	JPN	Ryosuke Nagasawa

== Club officials ==
Role	Name
Chairman	Pattama Roopsuwankul
Vice President	Phuriphat Ruangrueng
Head Coach	Damrongsak Boonmuang
Assistant Coach
Goalkeeping Coach
Fitness Coach
Video Analyst
Physiotherapist
