= Phongchana Kongkirit =

Thai footballer

Personal information
- Full name: Phongchana Kongkirit
- Date of birth: 10 August 1998 (age 28)
- Place of birth: Ubon Ratchathani, Thailand
- Height: 1.73 m (5 ft 8 in)
- Position: Forward

Team information
- Current team: Ubon Kruanapat
- Number: 7

Youth career
- 2014–2018: Buriram United

Senior career*
Years	Team	Apps	(Gls)
2018–2021	Buriram United	1	(0)
2020	→ Ubon Ratchathani (loan)	2	(0)
2020–2021	→ Angthong (loan)	16	(2)
2021–2023	Songkhla	15	(0)
2023–2024	Angthong	30	(0)
2025–	Ubon Kruanapat	20	(4)
- * Club domestic league appearances and goals as of 22 March 2026

Phongchana Kongkirit (Thai: พงษ์ชนะ กองกิริต; born 10 August 1998) is a Thai professional footballer who plays for Ubon Kruanapat in Thai League 3 as a forward.

== Honours ==
=== Club ===
Songkhla

- Thai League 3 Southern Region: 2022–23
