= Lopburi Poma F.C. =

Thai football club

Lopburi Poma ลพบุรี โพม่า
- Full name: Lopburi Poma Football Club สโมสรฟุตบอลลพบุรี โพม่า
- Nicknames: Hanumans (หนุมานออกศึก)
- Founded: 2022; 4 years ago as Lopburi City Football Club; 2026; 0 years ago as Lopburi Poma Football Club
- Ground: Lopburi Stadium; Lopburi, Thailand
- Capacity: 5,334
- Chairman: Suban Jirapanvanich
- Head Coach: Panithan Manprasert
- League: Thai League 3
- 2025–26: Thai League 3, 9th of 11 in the Central region
Home colours	Away colours

Lopburi Poma Football Club (Thai: สโมสรฟุตบอลลพบุรี โพม่า) is a Thailand professional football club based in Lopburi Province. The club is currently playing in the Thai League 3 Western region.

== History ==
In 2022, Lopburi City competed in the Thai League 3 for the 2022–23 season. It is their 1st season in the professional league. The club started the season with a 1–0 away win over Pathumthani University and they ended the season with a 2–3 home defeat to Pathumthani University. The club has finished 11th place in the league of the Western region. In addition, in the 2022–23 Thai League Cup Lopburi City was defeated 0–2 by Khon Kaen United in the first round, causing them to be eliminated.

== Stadium and locations ==
Coordinates	Location	Stadium	Capacity	Year
14°48′03″N 100°38′51″E	Lopburi	Phra Ramesuan Stadium (Lopburi province Stadium)	?	2008–2015

== Season by season domestic record ==
Season	League									FA Cup	League Cup	T3 Cup	Top goalscorer	
Season	Division	P	W	D	L	F	A	Pts	Pos	FA Cup	League Cup	T3 Cup	Name	Goals
2022	TA West	2	1	1	0	3	1	4	2nd	Opted out	Ineligible			
2022–23	T3 West	22	4	4	14	25	39	16	11th	Opted out	R1		(Cameroon) Ahmadou Tidjani, (Thailand) Noppadon Kasaen	4
2023–24	T3 West	20	10	4	6	35	16	34	5th	QR	QR1	SF	(Nigeria) Dzama Bata	8
2024–25	T3 Central	20	12	5	3	41	21	41	1st	R2	QR2	QF	(Cameroon) Alex Mermoz Djatche Nandje	15
2025–26	T3 Central	20	2	9	9	28	40	15	9th	R1	R1	Opted out	(Ghana) Eric Kumi	10
2026–27	T3 Central										QR1			

Champions	Runners-up	Promoted	Relegated

== Coaching staff ==
Position	Name
Head coach	(Thailand) Panithan Manprasert
Assistant coach	(Thailand)
Goalkeeper coach	(Thailand)
Fitness coach	(Thailand)
Match analyst	(Thailand)
Team Doctor	(Thailand)
Physiotherapists	(Thailand)
Media Officer	(Thailand)
Videographer	(Thailand)
Team manager	(Thailand)

== First team squad ==
As of 1 July 2026

Note: Flags indicate national team as defined under FIFA eligibility rules; some limited exceptions apply. Players may hold more than one non-FIFA nationality.

No.	Pos.	Nation	Player
2	DF	THA	Suphakit Noiyoon
3	MF	THA	Nontawat Klinjumpasri
4	DF	THA	Kritsana Jamniankarn
6	MF	THA	Pokklao Meesati
7	MF	THA	Noppakhun Yingbamrung
8	MF	THA	Witthawat Prasom
9	MF	THA	Arnont Pumsiri

No.	Pos.	Nation	Player
10	MF	THA	Kitsarin Chinasri
14	MF	THA	Teeramate Sappasomboon
19	DF	THA	Teerapat Sangwong
20	GK	THA	Suphanat Suman
25	GK	THA	Romran A-lawan
29	DF	THA	Phongsathon Kanchanarueangden
49	MF	THA	Siwakron Plodprong
88	MF	THA	Visitsak Chatree
95	GK	THA	Siraset Aekprathumchai

== Honours ==
=== Domestic leagues ===
- Thai League 3 Central Region
  - Winners (1): 2024–25
