= John Owoeri =

Nigerian footballer

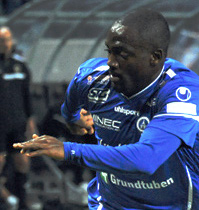
- Owoeri playing for Åtvidabergs FF in 2013

Personal information
- Full name: John Owoeri
- Date of birth: 13 January 1987 (age 39)
- Place of birth: Warri, Nigeria
- Height: 1.70 m (5 ft 7 in)
- Position: Striker

Youth career
- –2000: Polavis
- 2000–2002: Zumaz
- 2002–2004: NPA

Senior career*
Years	Team	Apps	(Gls)
2004–2005	Bendel Insurance		
2005–2006	Feyenoord	1	(0)
2006	→ Westerlo (loan)	10	(0)
2006–2009	Enyimba		
2009–2010	Heartland		
2010–2012	Ismaily	13	(2)
2012	Sunshine Stars		
2012–2013	Warri Wolves		
2013–2015	Åtvidabergs FF	77	(17)
2016	BK Häcken	26	(17)
2017	Baoding Yingli ETS	28	(14)
2018	Shanghai Shenxin	26	(9)
2019	Inner Mongolia Zhongyou	3	(0)
2019	Shaanxi Chang'an Athletic	7	(3)
2020	Beijing BSU	11	(2)
2022	IFK Mariehamn	22	(11)
2024–2025	Bankhai United		
2025–2026	Futera United		

International career
2005	Nigeria U20		
2010	Nigeria	1	(0)
- * Club domestic league appearances and goals as of April 2026

John Owoeri (born 13 January 1987) is a Nigerian professional footballer who last played as a striker for Thimphu FC.

== Club career ==
Whilst playing for Heartland in 2009, Owoeri scored two goals in a 6–1 thrashing of Monrovia Black Star in the CAF Champions League preliminary round. He joined Egyptian Premier League club Ismaily ahead of the 2010–11 season after two seasons with Heartland. In August 2012, Owoeri left Ismaily to sign for Nigerian side Sunshine Stars. He spent three months with the Akure club before joining Warri Wolves on 2 November 2012. On 7 April 2022, Owoeri signed with IFK Mariehamn in Finland.

== International career ==
In 2005, Owoeri scored a goal for the Nigeria under-20 team at the FIFA World Youth Championship. He has played one match for the Super Eagles, in an Africa Cup of Nations qualifier against Guinea.

== Honours ==
Individual

- Allsvenskan top scorer: 2016
