= Phra Ramesuan Stadium =

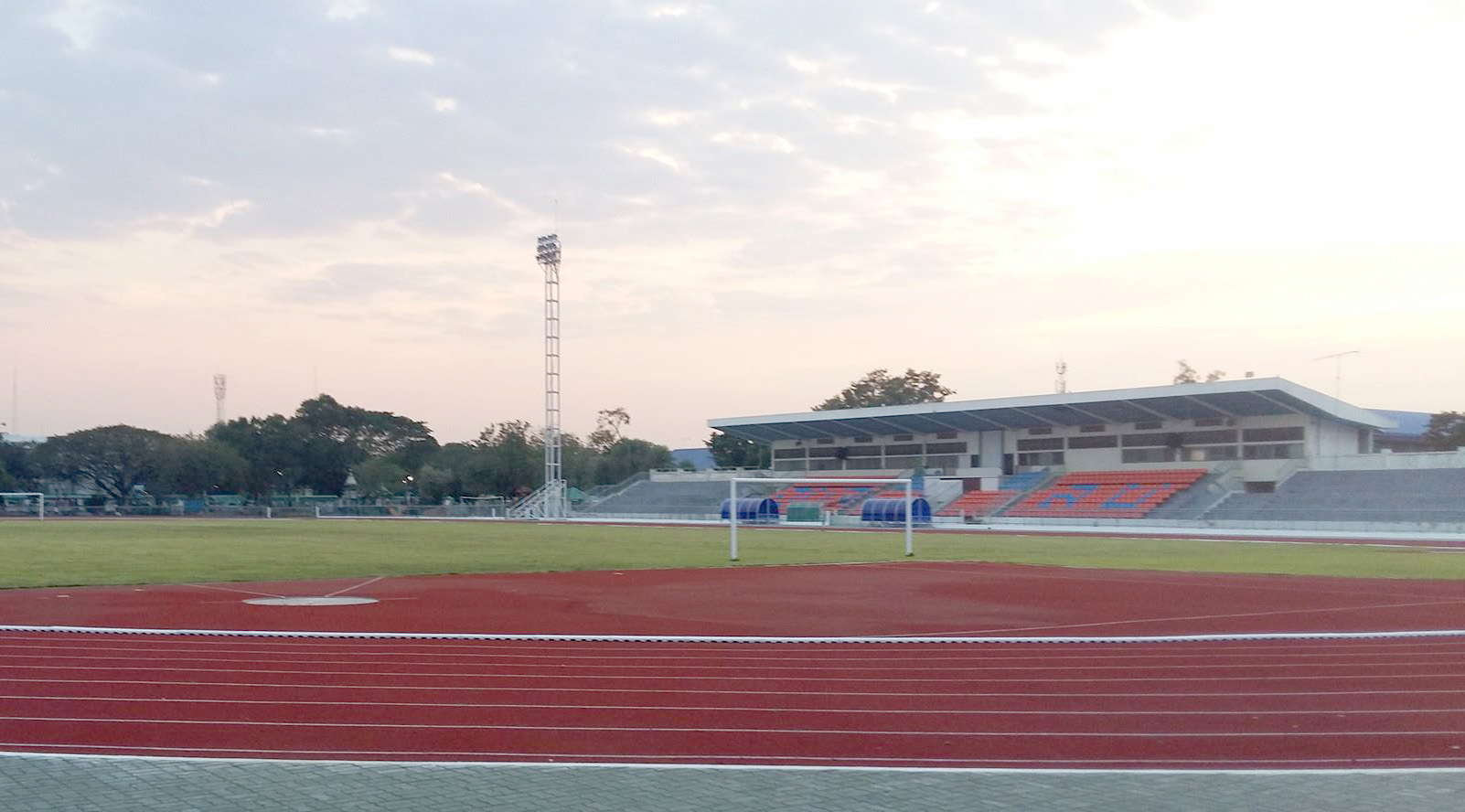
- Interactive map of Phra Ramesuan Stadium
- Location: Lopburi, Thailand
- Coordinates: 14°48′03″N 100°38′51″E
- Owner: Lopburi Provincial Administration Organization
- Operator: Lopburi Provincial Administration Organization
- Capacity: 5,500
- Surface: Grass

Tenant
- Lopburi F.C.

Phra Ramesuan Stadium (Thai: สนามกีฬาพระราเมศวร) is a multi-purpose stadium in Lopburi Province, Thailand. It is currently used mostly for football matches and is the home stadium of Lopburi. It is named after the king of ayutthaya, King Ramesuan.
