= Dhupatemiya Stadium =

Multipurpose stadium in Pathum Thani, Thailand

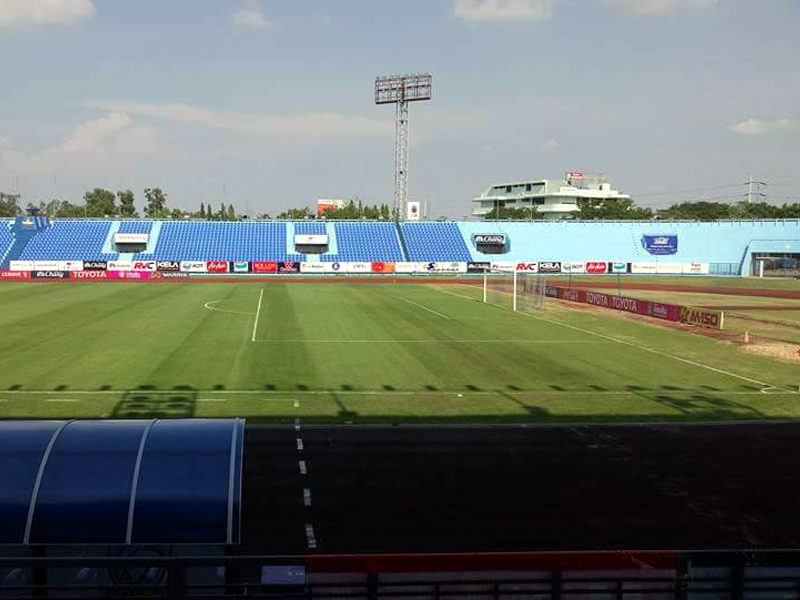
- Interactive map of Dhupatemiya Stadium
- Location: Khu Khot, Lam Luk Ka, Pathum Thani, Thailand
- Coordinates: 13°57′04″N 100°37′28″E
- Owner: Royal Thai Air Force
- Operator: Royal Thai Air Force
- Capacity: 25,000
- Surface: Grass
- Public transit: BTS Yaek Kor Por Aor

Tenant
- Royal Thai Air Force

Dhupatemiya Stadium (Thai: สนามกีฬาธูปเตมีย์) is a multi-purpose stadium in Pathum Thani, Thailand. It is currently used mostly for football matches and is the home stadium of Air Force Central Football Club. The stadium holds 25,000 people. The stadium was owned by Royal Thai Air Force.
