= Erick Luis =

Brazilian footballer (born 1992)

Personal information
- Full name: Erick Luis Palma dos Santos
- Date of birth: 16 July 1992 (age 34)
- Place of birth: Salvador, Bahia, Brazil
- Height: 1.83 m (6 ft 0 in)
- Positions: Forward; attacking midfielder

Team information
- Current team: Brasiliense

Youth career
- 2009–2010: Portuguesa Santista
- 2011: Botafogo
- 2012: Bahia

Senior career*
Years	Team	Apps	(Gls)
2013–2014	Bahia	2	(1 0)
2013	→ Olaria (loan)	30	(20)
2013	→ Galícia (loan)	10	(1)
2014	→ União Barbarense (loan)	10	(7)
2014	→ Bragantino (loan)	14	(2)
2015–2016	Vasco da Gama	22	(12)
2015	→ Bragantino (loan)	17	(1)
2015	→ Boa Esporte (loan)	20	(1)
2016	→ Osasco Audax (loan)	8	(1)
2016	→ Joinville (loan)	11	(1)
2017	Oeste	24	(1)
2017–2018	Manama Club	6	(0)
2019	Botafogo-SP	16	(18)
2020–2021	São Bento	19	(17)
2021–2022	Al-Hidd SCC	2	(0)
2022	Naft Maysan SC	0	(0)
2022–2023	SHB Đà Nẵng	6	(0)
2023-2024	Alagoinhas Atlético Clube	0	(0)
2024–	Rio Claro FC	2	(1)
2026-	Brasiliense	0	(0)
- * Club domestic league appearances and goals as of 15 January 2026

Erick Luis Palma dos Santos is a Brazilian footballer, known as just Erick Luis, who plays as an attacker for Brasiliense.

He has previously played in Campeonato Brasileiro Série A with Bahia and in Campeonato Brasileiro Série B with Bragantino, Boa Esporte, Joinville, Oeste and Brasiliense

== Career ==
In January 2015 Erick Luis was signed by Vasco da Gama on a two-year contract, but was not registered to play by the club, instead being successively loaned out to Bragantino, Boa Esporte, Osasco Audax and Joinville. He did not play a competitive game for Vasco da Gama.
