= Ang Thong Province Stadium =

Stadium

- Interactive map of Ang Thong Province Stadium
- Location: Ang Thong, Thailand
- Coordinates: 14°37′45″N 100°27′06″E
- Owner: Angthong Administrative Organisation
- Operator: Angthong Administrative Organisation
- Capacity: 10,000
- Surface: Grass

Tenant
- Angthong F.C.

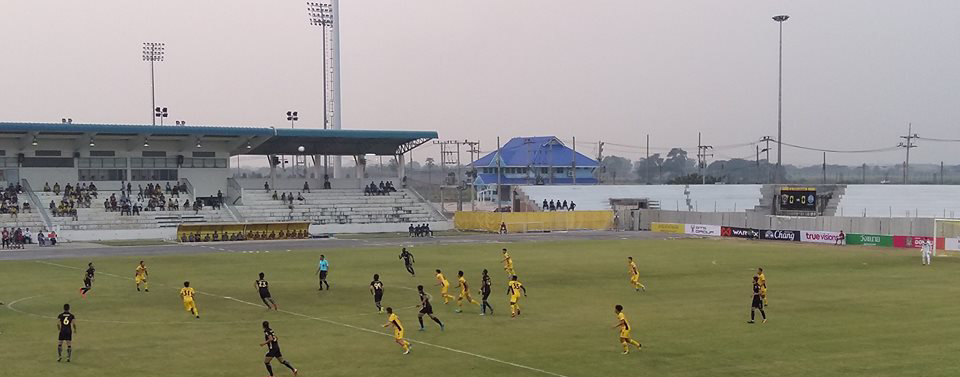

Ang Thong Province Stadium (Thai: สนามกีฬากลางจังหวัดอ่างทอง หรือ สนาม อบจ. อ่างทอง) is a multi-purpose stadium in Ang Thong Province, Thailand. It is currently used mostly for football matches and is the home stadium of Angthong F.C. The stadium holds 10,000 people.
