= 2025–26 Thai League Cup =

Muang Thai Cup

Tournament details
- Country: Thailand
- Dates: 7 October 2025 – 24 May 2026
- Teams: 80

Final positions
- Champions: Port (2nd title)
- Runners-up: BG Pathum United

Tournament statistics
- Matches played: 79
- Goals scored: 232 (2.94 per match)
- Top goal scorer(s): Teerasak Poeiphimai (5 goals)

Awards
- Best player: Lucas Tocantins

The 2025–26 Thai League Cup marked the 16th season of Thailand's knockout football competition in its second era. This edition of the League Cup signaled the tournament's return to Thai football after a 10-year hiatus. Sponsored by Muang Thai Life Assurance and Muang Thai Insurance, it was officially known as the Muang Thai Cup (Thai: เมืองไทย คัพ). 80 clubs were accepted into the competition, which commenced with the first qualification round on 7 October 2025 and concluded with the final on 24 May 2026. Notably, the tournament was open exclusively to clubs from Thai League 1, Thai League 2, and Thai League 3.

The competition structure was as follows: Clubs from Thai League 3 began their journey in the qualifying rounds, which are organized regionally. As the tournament progresses, clubs from Thai League 2 enter during the play-off round. The first round then saw the entry of clubs from Thai League 1, who await the winners of the previous rounds.

The competition offered the champions a prize of 5 million baht, while the runners-up earned 1 million baht. In addition to domestic silverware, the winner of the final earned qualification for the 2026–27 ASEAN Club Championship. The tournament's reintroduction marked its return to the Thai football calendar as a regional competition involving clubs from across the country.

== Calendar ==
| Round | Date | Matches | Clubs | New entries this round |
|---|---|---|---|---|
| First qualification round | 7–8 October 2025 | 13 | 26 → 13 | 26 2025–26 Thai League 3 |
| Second qualification round | 21–22 October 2025 | 19 | 13 + 25 → 19 | 25 2025–26 Thai League 3 |
| Qualification play-off round | 26–27 November 2025 and 10–17 December 2025 | 16 | 19 + 13 → 16 | 13 2025–26 Thai League 2 |
| First round | 27–28 December 2025 | 16 | 16 + 16 → 16 | 16 2025–26 Thai League 1 |
| Second round | 21–28 January 2026 | 8 | 16 → 8 | |
| Quarter-finals | 18 March 2026 | 4 | 8 → 4 | |
| Semi-finals | 8 April 2026 | 2 | 4 → 2 | |
| Final | 24 May 2026 | 1 | 2 → Champions | |
| Total | | | | 80 clubs |

== Results ==
Note: T1: Clubs from Thai League 1; T2: Clubs from Thai League 2; T3: Clubs from Thai League 3.

=== First qualification round ===
26 clubs from the 2025–26 Thai League 3 participated in the first qualification round of the 2025–26 Thai League Cup. The draw for this round took place on 20 August 2025. 39 goals were scored in this round.

Northern region
The first qualification round of the 2025–26 Thai League Cup in the Northern Region featured 4 clubs from the 2025–26 Thai League 3 Northern Region.

| 8 October 2025 | Northern Nakhon Mae Sot United (T3) | 0–4 (a.e.t.) | Khelang United (T3) | Mae Sot, Tak |
| 15:00 (UTC+7) | | Report | Shota Sagara 95'; Kritsada Taiwong 101'; Charoen Khotrsopha 103'; Oatsawin Kaeoraksa 120' | Stadium: Five Border Districts Stadium; Attendance: 56; Referee: Suphanat Yainta; Assistant referees: Thanawat Sangkon, Burin Kasemkittikun; Fourth official: Suchart Kuisue |

| 8 October 2025 | Phitsanulok (T3) | 1–1 (a.e.t.) (4–5 p) | Phichit United (T3) | Mueang, Phitsanulok |
| 18:00 (UTC+7) | Burnel Okana-Stazi 45+2' | Report | Ranyapakorn Konsanthia 78' | Stadium: Phitsanulok PAO. Stadium; Attendance: 2,368; Referee: Doungkaew Doungtawan; Assistant referees: Songrit Trakulchai, Jarin Champakpriew; Fourth official: Piyapong Thongkhain |
| | Penalties |
| | Yod Chanthawong (penalty scored); Juan Francisco Odorisio (penalty missed); Nuttasit Choosai (penalty scored); Sarayut Kongkool (penalty scored); Sakul Poonoy (penalty scored) | | (penalty scored) Saranyu Plangwal; (penalty scored) Parinya Khattiya; (penalty scored) Thanawat Montree; (penalty scored) Partchya Katethip; (penalty scored) Chaimongkol Botnok |

Central region
The first qualification round of the 2025–26 Thai League Cup in the Central Region featured 4 clubs from the 2025–26 Thai League 3 Central Region.

| 7 October 2025 | North Bangkok University (T3) | 2–2 (a.e.t.) (0–3 p) | Saraburi United (T3) | Thanyaburi, Pathum Thani |
| 15:00 (UTC+7) | Chokchai Toayale 50'; Erick Luis 81' (pen.) | Report | Saharat Rattanawijit 55'; Phadungkiat Artkitkarn 82' | Stadium: Stadium of North Bangkok University; Attendance: 100; Referee: Aidsara Gaedthai; Assistant referees: Waranon Soonsuwan, Haroot Himbenmut; Fourth official: Sarawut Nenrod |
| | Penalties |
| | Nattapat Onjan (penalty missed); Phasagorn Promhong (penalty missed); Chaloemphon Santanon (penalty missed) | | (penalty scored) Nattapoom Maya; (penalty scored) Peerapat Phonsawang; (penalty scored) Nattapong Phephat |

| 8 October 2025 | PTU Pathum Thani (T3) | 2–1 (a.e.t.) | Prime Bangkok (T3) | Bang Sai, Phra Nakhon Si Ayutthaya |
| 15:00 (UTC+7) | Panupong Hawan 47'; Pakawat Summart 113' | Report | Kamin Kurakanok 55' | Stadium: Ratchakram Stadium; Referee: Wutthinan Jampawai; Assistant referees: Pichaya Kasem, Saravut Suksalee; Fourth official: Theerapat Insena |

Northeastern region
The first qualification round of the 2025–26 Thai League Cup in the Northeastern Region featured 6 clubs from the 2025–26 Thai League 3 Northeastern Region.

| 7 October 2025 | Udon Banjan United (T3) | 3–0 | Khon Kaen Mordindang (T3) | Mueang, Udon Thani |
| 15:00 (UTC+7) | Sudthirak Chuisiri 2', 40'; Jirayu Saenap 90+4' | Report | | Stadium: Stadium of Thailand National Sports University, Udon Thani Campus; Attendance: 207; Referee: Patiyut Monthianart; Assistant referees: Wasan Promyaca, Yuranan Nukhao; Fourth official: Suparak Nilkad |

| 7 October 2025 | EUMT (T3) | 2–1 | Muang Loei United (T3) | Mueang, Ubon Ratchathani |
| 17:00 (UTC+7) | Natthikorn Yaprom 16'; Ratthasat Chailak 79' | Report | Amporn Chaipong 87' | Stadium: UMT Stadium; Attendance: 250; Referee: Chairat Phooalai; Assistant referees: Atiwat Yapakdee, Phakorn Dongja-roen; Fourth official: Tanakorn Chaikanya |

| 8 October 2025 | Udon United (T3) | 2–1 | Ubon Kruanapat (T3) | Mueang, Udon Thani |
| 15:00 (UTC+7) | Jhakkarin Sitthichan 14'; Narongkorn Buasri 62' (pen.) | Report | Offrod Vessawat 88' | Stadium: Stadium of Thailand National Sports University, Udon Thani Campus; Attendance: 154; Referee: Amnat Makklang; Assistant referees: Komkrit Sawong, Jirapun Hongsudta; Fourth official: Wuttiphat Khuttawong |

Eastern region
The first qualification round of the 2025–26 Thai League Cup in the Eastern Region featured 8 clubs from the 2025–26 Thai League 3 Eastern Region.

| 7 October 2025 | ACDC (T3) | 1–3 | Marines (T3) | Sattahip, Chonburi |
| 15:00 (UTC+7) | Jeelasak Saengchomphoo 18' | Report | Thanyapat Thanawut 4', 48'; Thanaphat Kamjhonkiadtikun 54' | Stadium: Battleship Stadium; Attendance: 95; Referee: Palathip Homwarn; Assistant referees: Komsan Wantavee, Kanathip Waithaisong; Fourth official: Narit Mungtoemklang |

| 8 October 2025 | Fleet (T3) | 1–2 (a.e.t.) | Chachoengsao Hi-Tek (T3) | Sattahip, Chonburi |
| 15:00 (UTC+7) | Chatri Rattanawong 72' | Report | Shayn Djelloul Chekalil 37', 115' | Stadium: Battleship Stadium; Attendance: 100; Referee: Nattaphak Sawasdee; Assistant referees: Tibeth Longtree, Supakorn Ruangrit; Fourth official: Surasak Khamphan |

| 8 October 2025 | Burapha United (T3) | 1–0 | Navy (T3) | Ban Bueng, Chonburi |
| 16:00 (UTC+7) | Warayut Klomnak 42' | Report | | Stadium: Banbueng Town Municipality Stadium; Attendance: 508; Referee: Nasri Tamat; Assistant referees: Nattphon Chuensamran, Patcharapon Losomsup; Fourth official: Ekkalak Muangkhotr |

| 8 October 2025 | BFB Pattaya City (T3) | 0–1 | Customs United (T3) | Bang Lamung, Chonburi |
| 18:00 (UTC+7) | | Report | Wasan Samansin 86' | Stadium: Nong Prue Stadium; Attendance: 170; Referee: Pongthep Raipimai; Assistant referees: Suwit Auttathun, Kodcharat Rattanachot; Fourth official: Nararit Srivorakul |

Western region
The first qualification round of the 2025–26 Thai League Cup in the Western Region featured 2 clubs from the 2025–26 Thai League 3 Western Region.

| 8 October 2025 | VRN Muangnont (T3) | 1–2 | Thonburi United (T3) | Mueang, Nonthaburi |
| 15:00 (UTC+7) | Apdussalam Saman 88' | Report | Kongpop Sroirak 24' (pen.); Lee Jae-seung 54' | Stadium: Nonthaburi City Municipality Stadium; Attendance: 179; Referee: Chakrit Siripong; Assistant referees: Jasada Tongkam, Titima Wongkhan; Fourth official: Song Montha |

Southern region
The first qualification round of the 2025–26 Thai League Cup in the Southern Region featured 2 clubs from the 2025–26 Thai League 3 Southern Region.

| 8 October 2025 | PSU Surat Thani City (T3) | 4–1 | Muang Trang United (T3) | Mueang, Surat Thani |
| 15:00 (UTC+7) | Abdulvaris Piansakul 28'; Natdanai Makkarat 60'; Toloba Aremu Kassim Mouyidine 67' (pen.); Marut Budrak 84' (o.g.) | Report | Chananon Wisetbamrungcharoen 86' | Stadium: Stadium of Prince of Songkla University, Surat Thani Campus; Attendance: 367; Referee: Wisarut Damthaklong; Assistant referees: Panuwat Chumming, Aris Bissalimin; Fourth official: Wilat Arunrat |

=== Second qualification round ===
The second qualification round consists of 13 clubs from 2025–26 Thai League 3, winners of the first qualification round, alongside 25 new clubs from the same league. 53 goals were scored in this round.

Northern region
The second qualification round of the 2025–26 Thai League Cup in the Northern Region featured 6 clubs from the 2025–26 Thai League 3 Northern Region.

| 21 October 2025 | Phichit United (T3) | 2–3 | Khelang United (T3) | Mueang, Phichit |
| 18:00 (UTC+7) | Saranyu Plangwal 45+5'; Parinya Khattiya 78' | Report | Shota Sagara 20'; Liu Chaoyang 64'; Kritsada Taiwong 67' | Stadium: Phichit Stadium; Attendance: 723; Referee: Anurak Sankaew; Assistant referees: Sumetee Khaokaew, Somlak Saefa; Fourth official: Piyapong Thongkhain |

| 22 October 2025 | Nakhon Sawan See Khwae City (T3) | 1–2 | Uttaradit (T3) | Mueang, Nakhon Sawan |
| 15:00 (UTC+7) | Park Yeon-seung 4' | Report | Nontawat Onsuebsai 5'; Kitisak Wantawee 84' | Stadium: Nakhon Sawan Provincial Stadium; Attendance: 33; Referee: Thanison Onjiw; Assistant referees: Anurut Samawimon, Kriangkrai Chaiya; Fourth official: Opars Oomsomsuai |

| 22 October 2025 | Kamphaengphet (T3) | 1–1 (a.e.t.) (3–4 p) | Chattrakan City (T3) | Mueang, Kamphaeng Phet |
| 15:00 (UTC+7) | Thibet Paison 32' | Report | Peerakan Timkjib 15' | Stadium: Cha Kung Rao Stadium; Attendance: 70; Referee: Supacha Chomchid; Assistant referees: Apipong Saehoe, Woottipong Younan; Fourth official: Chookiat Boonchoo |
| | Penalties |
| | Thibet Paison (penalty scored); Nattaphumin Doungphan (penalty missed); Khwanchai Bunprakhom (penalty scored); Yanavat Rattabut (penalty scored); Patiphol Thosaeng (penalty missed) | | (penalty scored) Masahiro Fujiwara; (penalty scored) Itthipol Janpang-ngern; (penalty scored) Diarra Junior Aboubacar; (penalty missed) Jetsadakorn Nuanthim; (penalty scored) Chariya Bomtaku |

Central region
The second qualification round of the 2025–26 Thai League Cup in the Central Region featured 6 clubs from the 2025–26 Thai League 3 Central Region.

| 22 October 2025 | Saraburi United (T3) | 0–1 | PTU Pathum Thani (T3) | Mueang, Saraburi |
| 15:00 (UTC+7) | | Report | Ratthakron Thongkae 59' | Stadium: Saraburi Stadium; Attendance: 76; Referee: Kittichai Huthip; Assistant referees: Patcharapon Losomsup, Arna Rattanabumchum; Fourth official: Patcharapong Chiangtaphisut |

| 22 October 2025 | Futera United (T3) | 0–1 | Kasem Bundit University (T3) | Khlong Luang, Pathum Thani |
| 15:00 (UTC+7) | | Report | Rattawat Kongkliang 17' | Stadium: Stadium of Bangkok University; Attendance: 120; Referee: Palathip Homwarn; Assistant referees: Adisai Pongnairat, Attapol Soheng; Fourth official: Ekkalak Muangkhotr |

| 22 October 2025 | Lopburi City (T3) | 3–0 | Singburi Warriors (T3) | Mueang, Lopburi |
| 15:00 (UTC+7) | Eric Kumi 9'; Sani Kamil 73'; Prapawich Tor-on 90+4' | Report | | Stadium: Phra Ramesuan Stadium; Attendance: 128; Referee: Pichit Thongjanmoon; Assistant referees: Nanthawat Chobsuan, Bukhori Lehnuh; Fourth official: Kattiya Saphu |

Northeastern region
The second qualification round of the 2025–26 Thai League Cup in the Northeastern Region featured 6 clubs from the 2025–26 Thai League 3 Northeastern Region.

| 21 October 2025 | Udon United (T3) | 0–0 (a.e.t.) (7–6 p) | Khon Kaen (T3) | Mueang, Udon Thani |
| 15:00 (UTC+7) | | Report | | Stadium: Stadium of Thailand National Sports University, Udon Thani Campus; Attendance: 204; Referee: Chairat Phooalai; Assistant referees: Nutthawat Kongsuwan, Kitsada Fromthaisong; Fourth official: Natthapol Sewakawihalee |
| | Penalties |
| | Victor Clemente de Oliveira Capinan (penalty scored); Sakari Tukiainen (penalty scored); Danuson Wijitpunya (penalty scored); Alongkorn Jornnathong (penalty scored); Tawin Butsombat (penalty scored); Pannathon Mungmai (penalty scored); Nakarin Butaka (penalty scored) | | (penalty scored) Jakkapan Pornsai; (penalty scored) Ratthaphon Phoopharot; (penalty scored) Nutdanai Ketpaen; (penalty scored) Kittichai Yomkhot; (penalty scored) Charin Boodhad; (penalty scored) Sarawin Saengra; (penalty missed) Suchanon Malison |

| 21 October 2025 | EUMT (T3) | 0–2 (a.e.t.) | Udon Banjan United (T3) | Mueang, Ubon Ratchathani |
| 17:00 (UTC+7) | | Report | João Guimarães 96'; Halef Pitbull 100' | Stadium: UMT Stadium; Attendance: 415; Referee: Kittiwat Kittpaksakun; Assistant referees: Suksan Thongkoed, Saharat Ngocharit; Fourth official: Methas Kumarasit |

| 22 October 2025 | Roi Et PB United (T3) | 6–0 | Surin Khong Chee Mool (T3) | Mueang, Roi Et |
| 18:00 (UTC+7) | Santirad Weing-in 17', 62'; Jung Hyeon-gu 26'; Sudhkat Phomduang 45+2' (pen.), 67'; Anon Anantasuk 72' (o.g.) | Report | | Stadium: Roi Et Provincial Stadium; Attendance: 659; Referee: Sittisak Kaewkam; Assistant referees: Nuttapong Khunlert, Kornthip Riyaboot; Fourth official: Teeramate Pooprang |

Eastern region
The second qualification round of the 2025–26 Thai League Cup in the Eastern Region featured 8 clubs from the 2025–26 Thai League 3 Eastern Region.

| 21 October 2025 | Burapha United (T3) | 6–0 | Saimit Kabin United (T3) | Ban Bueng, Chonburi |
| 16:00 (UTC+7) | Warayut Klomnak 33', 45+1', 79'; Apiwat Chuprai 38', 69'; Ekkachai Rittipan 90' | Report | | Stadium: Banbueng Town Municipality Stadium; Attendance: 430; Referee: Pornpumin Chaiyo; Assistant referees: Sujin Rodart, Pheerapat Yodnak; Fourth official: Pongthep Raipimai |

| 21 October 2025 | Customs United (T3) | 2–1 | Pluakdaeng United (T3) | Bang Phli, Samut Prakan |
| 17:00 (UTC+7) | Naoki Uemoto 10'; Anumat Seewongkaew 90+4' | Report | Thiwakon Seegun 16' | Stadium: Stadium of Customs Department, Lad Krabang 54; Attendance: 50; Referee: Narit Mungtoemklang; Assistant referees: Premsak Rungrueang, Peeyaporn Worachaikueakun; Fourth official: Kanakorn Teansawat |

| 22 October 2025 | Marines (T3) | 0–0 (a.e.t.) (15–16 p) | Padriew City (T3) | Sattahip, Chonburi |
| 15:00 (UTC+7) | | Report | | Stadium: Sattahip Navy Stadium; Attendance: 100; Referee: Nasri Tamat; Assistant referees: Nattphon Chuensamran, Somrak Wisakha; Fourth official: Watcharasak Intharak |
| | Penalties |
| | Akaradet Rattanasri (penalty scored); Watcharapong Nuangprakaew (penalty missed); Natthawat Klomkliaw (penalty missed); Sirawit Kasonsumol (penalty scored); Thanaphat Tanawut (penalty scored); Chonlapat Singruang (penalty scored); Noppadon Nobphasai (penalty scored); Suttipart Rungsivannagun (penalty scored); Sornchai Klongkratok (penalty scored); Nutthawut Yaempracha (penalty scored); Akaradet Rattanasri (penalty scored); Thanaphat Tanawut (penalty scored); Sirawit Kasonsumol (penalty scored); Chonlapat Singruang (penalty scored); Noppadon Nobphasai (penalty scored); Suttipart Rungsivannagun (penalty scored); Sornchai Klongkratok (penalty missed); Natthawat Klomkliaw (penalty scored); Watcharapong Nuangprakaew (penalty missed) | | (penalty scored) Jeremiah Kegbe; (penalty missed) Kongpon Ployprapai; (penalty missed) Atip Wattana; (penalty scored) Um Dabin; (penalty scored) Natapon Srisawat; (penalty scored) Kittichai Martsala; (penalty scored) Chayan Suanrat; (penalty scored) Kanchai Tor Wattanaphol; (penalty scored) Woraphol Phona; (penalty scored) Rchan Kaewpech; (penalty scored) Jeremiah Kegbe; (penalty scored) Um Dabin; (penalty scored) Chayan Suanrat; (penalty scored) Natapon Srisawat; (penalty scored) Kittichai Martsala; (penalty scored) Kongpon Ployprapai; (penalty missed) Atip Wattana; (penalty scored) Kanchai Tor Wattanaphol; (penalty scored) Woraphol Phona |

| 22 October 2025 | Chachoengsao Hi-Tek (T3) | 1–2 | Bankhai United (T3) | Mueang, Chachoengsao |
| 18:00 (UTC+7) | Shayn Djelloul Chekalil 20' | Report | Prawit Bureeted 3'; Anucha Phantong 64' | Stadium: Chachoengsao Town Municipality Stadium; Attendance: 253; Referee: Sopon Boonlest; Assistant referees: Jasada Tongkam, Suwit Auttathun; Fourth official: Rittikiat Jittakool |

Western region
The second qualification round of the 2025–26 Thai League Cup in the Western Region featured 6 clubs from the 2025–26 Thai League 3 Western Region.

| 21 October 2025 | Samut Sakhon City (T3) | 4–0 | Samut Songkhram City (T3) | Mueang, Samut Sakhon |
| 17:00 (UTC+7) | Supakorn Nutvijit 40'; Prachpeecha Pachthong 71'; Diogo Pereira 80', 84' | Report | | Stadium: Stadium of Thailand National Sports University, Samut Sakhon Campus; Attendance: 328; Referee: Dassakhon Hokla; Assistant referees: Tibeth Longtree, Kittithat Kengketkorn; Fourth official: Sarawut Nenrod |

| 22 October 2025 | Thonburi United (T3) | 3–1 (a.e.t.) | Nonthaburi United (T3) | Nong Khaem, Bangkok |
| 15:00 (UTC+7) | Kittipong Seanphong 40'; Ademola Sodiq Adeyemi 101'; Tanasrap Srikotapach 114' | Report | Piravich Aroonrat 65' | Stadium: Thonburi Stadium; Attendance: 120; Referee: Aidsara Gaedthai; Assistant referees: Narinsak Thongkham, Titima Wongkhan; Fourth official: Sukree Kurteng |

| 22 October 2025 | Hua Hin City (T3) | 0–3 (awd.) | Thap Luang United (T3) | Hua Hin, Prachuap Khiri Khan |
| 16:00 (UTC+7) | | | | Stadium: Hua Hin Town Municipality Stadium |

Southern region
The second qualification round of the 2025–26 Thai League Cup in the Southern Region featured 6 clubs from the 2025–26 Thai League 3 Southern Region.

| 22 October 2025 | Samui United (T3) | 0–1 (a.e.t.) | Yala (T3) | Ko Samui, Surat Thani |
| 15:00 (UTC+7) | | Report | Pithak Abdulraman 102' | Stadium: Ko Samui City Municipality International Stadium; Attendance: 400; Referee: Pornchai Anupan; Assistant referees: Mayunai Kueteh, Firhan Useng; Fourth official: Ameen Lorma |

| 22 October 2025 | PSU Surat Thani City (T3) | 5–0 | Krabi (T3) | Mueang, Surat Thani |
| 15:00 (UTC+7) | Osvaldo Nascimento dos Santos Neto 19'; Kritsada Jarujreet 22'; Teerawat Durnee 61', 76'; Natdanai Makkarat 85' | Report | | Stadium: Stadium of Prince of Songkla University, Surat Thani Campus; Attendance: 326; Referee: Aibroheem Sama; Assistant referees: Pumipat Arwutpet, Wachirapat Anurak; Fourth official: Irfan Sama |

| 22 October 2025 | Nara United (T3) | 0–1 | PT Satun (T3) | Mueang, Narathiwat |
| 16:00 (UTC+7) | | Report | Airfan Cheali 3' | Stadium: Narathiwat PAO. Stadium; Attendance: 4,567; Referee: Pornsak Paksan; Assistant referees: Charin Kalamad, Suwit Kaewrod; Fourth official: Matoha Sayo |

=== Qualification play-off round ===
The qualification play-off round consists of 19 clubs from 2025–26 Thai League 3, winners of the second qualification round, alongside 13 new clubs from 2025–26 Thai League 2. The draw for this round took place on 11 November 2025. 48 goals were scored in this round.

| 26 November 2025 | Kasem Bundit University (T3) | 2–4 | Chainat Hornbill (T2) | Min Buri, Bangkok |
| 15:00 (UTC+7) | Nithikorn Bunjungam 89' (pen.); Supakrit Petpon 90+3' | Report; Highlight | Tatsuhide Shimizu 48'; Warakorn Thongbai 50' (pen.); Amarildo de Andrade Pedro Junior 63'; Adolph Kodzo Koudakpo 73' | Stadium: Stadium of Kasem Bundit University; Attendance: 258; Referee: Direk Kaort; Assistant referees: Kiadtisak Janmol, Nattphon Chuensamran; Fourth official: Noppadet Mangngam |

| 26 November 2025 | Udon United (T3) | 1–1 (a.e.t.) (3–4 p) | Khon Kaen United (T2) | Mueang, Udon Thani |
| 15:00 (UTC+7) | Tawin Butsombat 17' | Report; Highlight | Suwit Paipromrat 13' | Stadium: Stadium of Thailand National Sports University, Udon Thani Campus; Attendance: 109; Referee: Narinnart Tiamskun; Assistant referees: Authen Dansalao, Nuttapong Khunlert; Fourth official: Krisda Luangyos |
| | Penalties |
| | Victor Clemente de Oliveira Capinan (penalty scored); Nuttawut Khamrin (penalty scored); Thanathip Paengwong (penalty missed); Jhakkarin Sitthichan (penalty scored); Alongkorn Jornnathong (penalty missed) | | (penalty scored) Phanuphong Phonsa; (penalty scored) Arthit Boodjinda; (penalty scored) Sarawut Inpaen; (penalty scored) Jiradet Taichankong |

| 26 November 2025 | Thonburi United (T3) | 2–2 (a.e.t.) (3–0 p) | Sisaket United (T2) | Nong Khaem, Bangkok |
| 15:00 (UTC+7) | Peerapong Ngaowanphlop 25'; Narathip Kruearanya 92' | Report; Highlight | Pattanaporn Promdaen 40'; Fellipe Cabral Veloso dos Santos 116' | Stadium: Thonburi Stadium; Attendance: 320; Referee: Kitisak Pikunngoen; Assistant referees: Sarayut Sriampri, Anucha Pinamon; Fourth official: Sila Jinnigorn |
| | Penalties |
| | Kittipong Seanphong (penalty scored); Chatturong Longsriphum (penalty scored); Phakhawat Sapphaso (penalty scored) | | (penalty missed) Kwon Dae-hee; (penalty missed) Theerapat Laohabut; (penalty missed) Jirattikan Vapilai |

| 26 November 2025 | Burapha United (T3) | 0–1 | Mahasarakham SBT (T2) | Ban Bueng, Chonburi |
| 16:00 (UTC+7) | | Report; Highlight | Chitchanok Xaysensourinthone 53' | Stadium: Banbueng Town Municipality Stadium; Attendance: 508; Referee: Chaikrit Inboonsong; Assistant referees: Pakorn Srichumsin, Kantrakorn Ngaosri; Fourth official: Satchukorn Saenchu |

| 26 November 2025 | Samut Sakhon City (T3) | 1–0 | Nakhon Si United (T2) | Mueang, Samut Sakhon |
| 17:00 (UTC+7) | Atsanai Chantama 74' | Report; Highlight | | Stadium: Stadium of Thailand National Sports University, Samut Sakhon Campus; Attendance: 388; Referee: Kriangkrai Thiphanunjarukorn; Assistant referees: Pornchai Kongdamni, Mongkhon Kaisin; Fourth official: U-sen Yala |

| 26 November 2025 | Padriew City (T3) | 0–2 | Bangkok (T2) | Mueang, Chachoengsao |
| 17:00 (UTC+7) | | Report; Highlight | Jarvey Gayoso 60'; Phattharaphol Khamsuk 75' | Stadium: Chachoengsao Provincial Stadium; Attendance: 148; Referee: Putthipong Issising; Assistant referees: Srisuwan Boonnum, Sadsampan Kunsakoo; Fourth official: Phadoongkiat Piangdee |

| 26 November 2025 | Thap Luang United (T3) | 1–0 | Police Tero (T2) | Mueang, Nakhon Pathom |
| 18:00 (UTC+7) | Wuttichat Yiamming 84' | Report; Highlight | | Stadium: Thap Luang United Janded Stadium; Attendance: 197; Referee: Samrit Ritkaew; Assistant referees: Nissan Janthep, Siwat Chaithong; Fourth official: Chaiya Moolmanee |

| 27 November 2025 | Udon Banjan United (T3) | 2–2 (a.e.t.) (3–4 p) | Bankhai United (T3) | Mueang, Udon Thani |
| 15:00 (UTC+7) | Jirayu Saenap 1'; Phongphat Pholphut 69' | Report; Highlight | Jirayu Kambang 17'; Pipattanapong Buntom 51' | Stadium: Stadium of Thailand National Sports University, Udon Thani Campus; Attendance: 128; Referee: Kittiwat Kittpaksakun; Assistant referees: Nutthawat Kongsuwan, Panupong Wannapate; Fourth official: Limonfine Poxpong |
| | Penalties |
| | Sakda Noppakdee (penalty missed); Kamonchai Somsuk (penalty scored); Natdanai Chudtale (penalty scored); Adisak Hantes (penalty scored); Sompong Saisoda (penalty missed) | | (penalty scored) Bernard Owusu Mintah; (penalty scored) Prawit Bureeted; (penalty scored) Chinnapat Kaikaew; (penalty scored) Thammawat Trailum |

| 27 November 2025 | Uttaradit (T3) | 2–1 | Kasetsart (T2) | Mueang, Uttaradit |
| 15:00 (UTC+7) | Arnon Prasongporn 50'; Nirut Jamroensri 78' | Report; Highlight | Ismaïl Sassi 90+5' | Stadium: Uttaradit Provincial Stadium; Attendance: 297; Referee: Peerasan Krataithong; Assistant referees: Apichat Prasasak, Kriangsak Pimsanit; Fourth official: Sarayut Jakngoen |

| 27 November 2025 | PTU Pathum Thani (T3) | 0–2 | Pattaya United (T2) | Bang Sai, Phra Nakhon Si Ayutthaya |
| 15:00 (UTC+7) | | Report; Highlight | Pedro Henrique 11' (pen.), 90+3' | Stadium: Ratchakram Stadium; Attendance: 125; Referee: Komgrit Ponpasit; Assistant referees: Thanet Jairaw, Kattiya Saphu; Fourth official: Natee Choosuwan |

| 27 November 2025 | Customs United (T3) | 3–2 (a.e.t.) | Chattrakan City (T3) | Bang Phli, Samut Prakan |
| 17:00 (UTC+7) | Pissanu Sibutta 28' (o.g.); Shunta Hasegawa 52'; Wasan Samansin 119' | Report; Highlight | Diarra Junior Aboubacar 63', 90' | Stadium: Stadium of Customs Department, Lad Krabang 54; Attendance: 100; Referee: Watcharasak Intharak; Assistant referees: Ritthiphong Phimpapan, Padsakorn Jaihom; Fourth official: Pornpumin Chaiyo |

| 27 November 2025 | Khelang United (T3) | 1–6 | Nongbua Pitchaya (T2) | Mueang, Lampang |
| 18:00 (UTC+7) | Sirasit Hochin 72' | Report; Highlight | Caio Rodrigues da Cruz 7', 61'; Jardel 55', 79', 89' (pen.); Jakkrawut Songma 90+1' | Stadium: Lampang Provincial Stadium; Attendance: 465; Referee: Wathanyu Morin; Assistant referees: Sornram Yutim, Songrit Trakulchai; Fourth official: Panumas Phansamo |

| 27 November 2025 | Roi Et PB United (T3) | 0–4 | Pattani (T2) | Mueang, Roi Et |
| 18:00 (UTC+7) | | Report; Highlight | Phattharaphon Junsuwan 45'; Imron Hayiyusoh 48'; Rushdan Katemmadee 70'; Adithep Chaisrianan 90+2' | Stadium: Roi Et Provincial Stadium; Attendance: 528; Referee: Manuschai Chawong; Assistant referees: Anupong Sangtopo, Nattapong Wadweangcom; Fourth official: Seksan Phansri |

| 10 December 2025 | PSU Surat Thani City (T3) | 0–1 | PT Satun (T3) | Mueang, Surat Thani |
| 15:00 (UTC+7) | | Report; Highlight | Caio da Conceição Silva 51' | Stadium: Stadium of Prince of Songkla University, Surat Thani Campus; Attendance: 220; Referee: Montree Yeereem; Assistant referees: Satira Yunyongkait, Suwit Kaewrod; Fourth official: Anwa Hayiyusoh |

| 10 December 2025 | Yala (T3) | 0–1 | Nakhon Pathom United (T2) | Mueang, Yala |
| 19:00 (UTC+7) | | Report; Highlight | Kridsada Limseeput 60' | Stadium: Stadium of Yala Rajabhat University; Attendance: 1,195; Referee: Anon Lohlor; Assistant referees: Phitsanu Chusi, Phongsiri Chusi; Fourth official: Jiraphan Yodphut |

| 17 December 2025 | Lopburi City (T3) | 4–0 | Songkhla (T2) | Mueang, Lopburi |
| 15:00 (UTC+7) | Eric Kumi 2', 51'; Ozobialu Chinedu Kennedy Kennedy 37'; Teeramate Sappasomboon 45+4' | Report; Highlight | | Stadium: Phra Ramesuan Stadium; Attendance: 123; Referee: Kittichai Huthip; Assistant referees: Sahatnet Deemongkol, Kriangsak Pimsanit; Fourth official: Kriangkrai Thiphanunjarukorn |

=== First round ===
The first round consists of 32 clubs. This includes 16 clubs advancing from the qualification play-off round, with 8 clubs representing the 2025–26 Thai League 2 and 8 clubs from the 2025–26 Thai League 3. Additionally, 16 top-tier clubs from the 2025–26 Thai League 1 joined the competition at this stage. The draw for this round took place on 28 November 2025. 46 goals were scored in this round.

| 27 December 2025 | Thonburi United (T3) | 0–4 | Buriram United (T1) | Nong Khaem, Bangkok |
| 15:00 (UTC+7) | | Report; Highlight | Guilherme Bissoli 42', 80'; Thanakrit Chotmuangpak 70'; Curtis Good 90+3' | Stadium: Thonburi Stadium; Attendance: 2,250; Referee: Sila Jinnigorn; Assistant referees: Vichet Getkaew, Nuannid Donjangreed; Fourth official: Kittichai Huthip |

| 27 December 2025 | Thap Luang United (T3) | 0–0 (a.e.t.) (4–3 p) | Chiangrai United (T1) | Mueang, Nakhon Pathom |
| 18:00 (UTC+7) | | Report; Highlight | | Stadium: Thap Luang United Janded Stadium; Attendance: 737; Referee: Kitisak Pikunngoen; Assistant referees: Siwat Chaithong, Kiadtisak Janmol; Fourth official: Samrit Ritkaew |
| | Penalties |
| | Phuwanet Thongkhui (penalty scored); Adunlikhit Saengdaeng (penalty scored); Pakarapon Mad-adam (penalty scored); Phanuwat Phiooon (penalty missed); Natthaphon Khotpakdee (penalty scored) | | (penalty missed) Jordan Emaviwe; (penalty scored) Sanukran Thinjom; (penalty scored) Montree Promsawat; (penalty scored) Ongsa Singthong; (penalty missed) Apirak Worawong |

| 27 December 2025 | Bankhai United (T3) | 0–1 | Ayutthaya United (T1) | Ban Khai, Rayong |
| 18:00 (UTC+7) | | Report; Highlight | Conrado 73' | Stadium: Wai Krong Stadium; Attendance: 370; Referee: Warintron Sassadee; Assistant referees: Jagkrit Kaenkaew, Nissan Janthep; Fourth official: Worapon Sanjan |

| 27 December 2025 | Nongbua Pitchaya (T2) | 1–5 | Chonburi (T1) | Mueang, Nong Bua Lamphu |
| 18:00 (UTC+7) | Wutthichai Marom 16' | Report; Highlight | Rachata Moraksa 21'; Channarong Promsrikaew 29'; Oege-Sietse van Lingen 60' (pen.); Queven 61'; Yotsakorn Burapha 90+1' | Stadium: Pitchaya Stadium; Attendance: 1,200; Referee: Woottipong Ketkam; Assistant referees: Kriangsak Pimsanit, Nattapong Wadweangcom; Fourth official: Palathip Homwarn |

| 27 December 2025 | Bangkok (T2) | 0–4 | Muangthong United (T1) | Thung Khru, Bangkok |
| 18:30 (UTC+7) | | Report; Highlight | Anass Ahannach 18', 55'; Korawich Tasa 85'; Kakana Khamyok 88' | Stadium: 72nd Anniversary Stadium, Bang Mot; Attendance: 1,642; Referee: Anusorn Nookaew; Assistant referees: Chaowalit Poonprasit, Kasama Loyma; Fourth official: Kriangkrai Thiphanunjarukorn |

| 27 December 2025 | Khon Kaen United (T2) | 1–0 (a.e.t.) | Kanchanaburi Power (T1) | Mueang, Khon Kaen |
| 18:30 (UTC+7) | Felipe Amorim 120+3' | Report; Highlight | | Stadium: Khon Kaen PAO. Stadium; Attendance: 3,071; Referee: Jirawit Phonkaew; Assistant referees: Phubes Lekpha, Banpot Khunhong; Fourth official: Kittiwat Kittpaksakun |

| 27 December 2025 | Nakhon Pathom United (T2) | 0–2 | Uthai Thani (T1) | Mueang, Nakhon Pathom |
| 19:00 (UTC+7) | | Report; Highlight | Bruno Baio 31', 90+6' | Stadium: Nakhon Pathom Municipality Sports School Stadium; Attendance: 812; Referee: Peerasan Krataithong; Assistant referees: Komsan Kampan, Yossapon Tongprom; Fourth official: Alongkorn Khonwai |

| 28 December 2025 | Lopburi City (T3) | 1–2 | Nakhon Ratchasima Mazda (T1) | Mueang, Lopburi |
| 15:00 (UTC+7) | Teeramate Sappasomboon 59' | Report; Highlight | Chitsanuphong Phimpsang 44'; Nenad Lalić 90+2' | Stadium: Phra Ramesuan Stadium; Attendance: 350; Referee: Sarayut Jakngoen; Assistant referees: Tanate Chuchuen, Waranyoo Chomgoson; Fourth official: Pawara Seejen |

| 28 December 2025 | Uttaradit (T3) | 0–4 | BG Pathum United (T1) | Mueang, Uttaradit |
| 15:00 (UTC+7) | | Report; Highlight | Matheus Fornazari Custódio 8' (pen.), 22'; Surachat Sareepim 83'; Pongrawit Jantawong 90+1' | Stadium: Uttaradit Provincial Stadium; Attendance: 1,656; Referee: Veeraporn Maophaeo; Assistant referees: Apichit Nophuan, Binla Preeda; Fourth official: Thapakorn Thongkon |

| 28 December 2025 | PT Satun (T3) | 0–2 | Lamphun Warriors (T1) | Mueang, Satun |
| 16:00 (UTC+7) | | Report; Highlight | Peniel Mlapa 23'; Witthaya Moonwong 45+2' | Stadium: Satun PAO. Stadium; Attendance: 2,525; Referee: Natee Choosuwan; Assistant referees: Watthana Chonchanakul, Tuwae-yusoh Kuji; Fourth official: Ameen Lorma |

| 28 December 2025 | Samut Sakhon City (T3) | 0–2 | PT Prachuap (T1) | Mueang, Samut Sakhon |
| 17:00 (UTC+7) | | Report; Highlight | Jirapan Phasukihan 45+2'; Iklas Sanron 54' | Stadium: Stadium of Thailand National Sports University, Samut Sakhon Campus; Attendance: 984; Referee: Komgrit Ponpasit; Assistant referees: Sahatnet Deemongkol, Sarayut Sriampri; Fourth official: Noppadet Mangngam |

| 28 December 2025 | Customs United (T3) | 2–3 | Sukhothai (T1) | Bang Phli, Samut Prakan |
| 17:00 (UTC+7) | Anumat Seewongkaew 50'; Shunta Hasegawa 53' | Report; Highlight | Eito Ishimoto 28'; Thiti Thumporn 63'; Gildo Henrique Malta de Araújo 90+2' | Stadium: Stadium of Customs Department, Lad Krabang 54; Attendance: 587; Referee: Phairot Bunkamnoed; Assistant referees: Rachain Srichai, Authen Dansalao; Fourth official: Satchukorn Saenchu |

| 28 December 2025 | Pattaya United (T2) | 0–3 | Bangkok United (T1) | Bang Lamung, Chonburi |
| 18:00 (UTC+7) | | Report; Highlight | Teerasil Dangda 58', 90+5'; Ilias Alhaft 78' | Stadium: Nong Prue Stadium; Attendance: 1,875; Referee: Chaikrit Inboonsong; Assistant referees: Poonsawat Samransuk, Narin Wongprapipak; Fourth official: Akom Charoensuk |

| 28 December 2025 | Mahasarakham SBT (T2) | 1–1 (a.e.t.) (4–3 p) | Rayong (T1) | Mueang, Maha Sarakham |
| 18:00 (UTC+7) | Lwin Moe Aung 35' | Report; Highlight | Júnior Batista 72' (pen.) | Stadium: Mahasarakham Provincial Stadium; Attendance: 1,765; Referee: Kotchapoom Meesridaecha; Assistant referees: Rachan Dawangpa, Chaiya Sripak; Fourth official: Manuschai Chawong |
| | Penalties |
| | Leandro Assumpção (penalty missed); Nukoolkit Krutyai (penalty scored); Wander Luiz (penalty missed); Sajjaporn Tumsuwan (penalty scored); Jetjinn Sriprach (penalty scored); Akito Saito (penalty scored) | | (penalty missed) Ryoma Ito; (penalty missed) Thanphisit Hempandan; (penalty scored) Manny Ott; (penalty scored) Parkin Harape; (penalty scored) Wasusiwakit Phusirit; (penalty missed) Peerapat Kaminthong |

| 28 December 2025 | Chainat Hornbill (T2) | 0–5 | Port (T1) | Mueang, Chai Nat |
| 18:30 (UTC+7) | | Report; Highlight | Suphanan Bureerat 17'; Teerasak Poeiphimai 40'; Lucas Tocantins 58'; Brayan Perea 67'; Sivakorn Tiatrakul 79' | Stadium: Khao Plong Stadium; Attendance: 1,562; Referee: Panumas Phansamo; Assistant referees: Worapong Prasartsri, Sumate Peasiri; Fourth official: Ekkachai Phetcham |

| 28 December 2025 | Pattani (T2) | 2–0 | Ratchaburi (T1) | Mueang, Pattani |
| 19:00 (UTC+7) | Chukid Wanpraphao 45+1'; Imron Hayiyusoh 60' | Report; Highlight | | Stadium: Pattani PAO. Stadium; Attendance: 12,000; Referee: Chaireag Ngam-som; Assistant referees: Natthaphon Mala, Srisuwan Boonnum; Fourth official: Anon Lohlor |

=== Second round ===
The second round consists of 16 clubs, all of which secured victories in the first round. This stage features 12 clubs from the T1, 3 clubs from the T2, and 1 club from the T3. The draw for this round took place on 8 January 2026. 23 goals were scored in this round.

| 21 January 2026 | Buriram United (T1) | 3–2 | PT Prachuap (T1) | Mueang, Buriram |
| 18:00 (UTC+7) | Suphanat Mueanta 8', 66'; Rubén Sánchez 60' | Report; Highlight | Tauã 74'; Jirapan Phasukihan 81' | Stadium: Chang Arena; Attendance: 10,927; Referee: Noppadet Mangngam; Assistant referees: Pattarapong Kijsathit, Rachan Dawangpa; Fourth official: Satchukorn Saenchu |

| 21 January 2026 | Khon Kaen United (T2) | 2–2 (a.e.t.) (4–3 p) | Bangkok United (T1) | Mueang, Khon Kaen |
| 18:30 (UTC+7) | Chitsanupong Choti 75'; Amadou Ouattara 113' | Report; Highlight | Teerasil Dangda 90+2'; Seia Kunori 120+1' | Stadium: Khon Kaen PAO. Stadium; Attendance: 3,178; Referee: Natee Choosuwan; Assistant referees: Binla Preeda, Kasama Loyma; Fourth official: Kotchapoom Meesridaecha |
| | Penalties |
| | Felipe Amorim (penalty scored); Jiradet Taichankong (penalty scored); Nopphon Ponkam (penalty missed); Suwit Paipromrat (penalty scored); Amadou Ouattara (penalty scored) | | (penalty scored) Guntapon Keereeleang; (penalty scored) Rivaldinho; (penalty missed) Everton; (penalty scored) Thitiphan Puangchan; (penalty missed) Wanchai Jarunongkran |

| 21 January 2026 | Muangthong United (T1) | 0–2 | BG Pathum United (T1) | Pak Kret, Nonthaburi |
| 19:00 (UTC+7) | | Report; Highlight | Ikhsan Fandi 32', 45' | Stadium: Thunderdome Stadium; Attendance: 3,128; Referee: Chaikrit Inboonsong; Assistant referees: Natthaphon Mala, Poonsawat Samransuk; Fourth official: Komgrit Ponpasit |

| 28 January 2026 | Thap Luang United (T3) | 1–0 | Sukhothai (T1) | Mueang, Nakhon Pathom |
| 18:00 (UTC+7) | Suraphod Pankhruea 77' | Report; Highlight | | Stadium: Thap Luang United Janded Stadium; Attendance: 1,576; Referee: Kotchapoom Meesridaecha; Assistant referees: Chaowalit Poonprasit, Narin Wongprapipak; Fourth official: Veeraporn Maophaeo |

| 28 January 2026 | Lamphun Warriors (T1) | 0–3 | Chonburi (T1) | Mueang, Lamphun |
| 18:00 (UTC+7) | | Report; Highlight | Oege-Sietse van Lingen 11', 81'; Yotsakorn Burapha 51' | Stadium: Lamphun Warriors Stadium; Attendance: 1,738; Referee: Panumas Phansamo; Assistant referees: Apichit Nophuan, Srisuwan Boonnum; Fourth official: Chaireag Ngam-som |

| 28 January 2026 | Mahasarakham SBT (T2) | 2–0 | Nakhon Ratchasima Mazda (T1) | Mueang, Maha Sarakham |
| 18:30 (UTC+7) | Kongpop Artserm 5'; Akito Saito 19' | Report; Highlight | | Stadium: Mahasarakham Provincial Stadium; Attendance: 1,842; Referee: Pawara Seejen; Assistant referees: Phubes Lekpha, Rachan Dawangpa; Fourth official: Natee Choosuwan |

| 28 January 2026 | Port (T1) | 2–1 | Ayutthaya United (T1) | Khlong Toei, Bangkok |
| 19:00 (UTC+7) | Brayan Perea 31'; Matheus Guilherme Lins de Almeida 40' | Report; Highlight | Kritsana Kasemkulvilai 76' | Stadium: PAT Stadium; Attendance: 2,389; Referee: Peerasan Krataithong; Assistant referees: Komsan Kampan, Rachain Srichai; Fourth official: Kitisak Pikunngoen |

| 28 January 2026 | Pattani (T2) | 2–1 | Uthai Thani (T1) | Mueang, Pattani |
| 19:00 (UTC+7) | Felipe Nunes 45+2'; Shuto Ono 90+5' | Report; Highlight | Nontapat Naksawat 28' | Stadium: Pattani PAO. Stadium; Attendance: 10,100; Referee: Songkran Bunmeekiart; Assistant referees: Watthana Chonchanakul, Vichet Getkaew; Fourth official: Anon Lohlor |

=== Quarter-finals ===
The quarter-finals consist of 8 clubs, all of which secured victories in the second round. This stage features 4 clubs from the T1, 3 clubs from the T2, and 1 club from the T3. The draw for this round took place on 26 February 2026. 14 goals were scored in this round.

| 18 March 2026 | BG Pathum United (T1) | 3–0 | Mahasarakham SBT (T2) | Thanyaburi, Pathum Thani |
| 18:00 (UTC+7) | Ikhsan Fandi 45+4', 90+1'; Yoshiaki Takagi 70' | Report; Highlight | | Stadium: True BG Stadium; Attendance: 5,058; Referee: Noppadet Mangngam; Assistant referees: Pattarapong Kijsathit, Chaowalit Poonprasit; Fourth official: Natee Choosuwan |

| 18 March 2026 | Chonburi (T1) | 1–0 | Thap Luang United (T3) | Mueang, Chonburi |
| 18:00 (UTC+7) | Yotsakorn Burapha 49' | Report; Highlight | | Stadium: Chonburi Daikin Stadium; Attendance: 3,944; Referee: Kitisak Pikunngoen; Assistant referees: Natthaphon Mala, Watthana Chonchanakul; Fourth official: Akom Charoensuk |

| 18 March 2026 | Port (T1) | 7–0 | Khon Kaen United (T2) | Khlong Toei, Bangkok |
| 19:00 (UTC+7) | Teerasak Poeiphimai 29', 36', 76', 89'; Worachit Kanitsribampen 54', 90+2'; Peeradol Chamrasamee 65' | Report; Highlight | | Stadium: PAT Stadium; Attendance: 1,818; Referee: Chaikrit Inboonsong; Assistant referees: Komsan Kampan, Binla Preeda; Fourth official: Komgrit Ponpasit |

| 18 March 2026 | Pattani (T2) | 0–3 | Buriram United (T1) | Mueang, Pattani |
| 19:00 (UTC+7) | | Report; Highlight | Kingsley Schindler 33'; Supachai Chaided 37'; Shinnaphat Leeaoh 75' | Stadium: Pattani PAO. Stadium; Attendance: 12,000; Referee: Kotchapoom Meesridaecha; Assistant referees: Chotrawee Tongduang, Poonsawat Samransuk; Fourth official: Sila Jinnigorn |

=== Semi-finals ===
The semi-finals consist of 4 clubs, all from the T1. These clubs progressed to this stage after winning their respective matches in the quarter-finals. The draw for this round took place on 24 March 2026. 8 goals were scored in this round.

| 8 April 2026 | Buriram United (T1) | 0–1 | BG Pathum United (T1) | Mueang, Chonburi |
| 19:00 (UTC+7) | | Report; Highlight | Surachat Sareepim 48' | Stadium: Chonburi Daikin Stadium; Attendance: 5,237; Referee: Torphong Somsing; Assistant referees: Apichit Nophuan, Rachain Srichai; Fourth official: Noppadet Mangngam |

| 8 April 2026 | Chonburi (T1) | 3–4 | Port (T1) | Phra Nakhon Si Ayutthaya, Phra Nakhon Si Ayutthaya |
| 19:00 (UTC+7) | Jonathan Bolingi 29' (pen.); Queven 36'; Yotsakorn Burapha 90+8' | Report; Highlight | Chaiyawat Buran 11'; Matheus Guilherme Lins de Almeida 55'; Brayan Perea 67', 75' | Stadium: Phra Nakhon Si Ayutthaya Provincial Stadium; Attendance: 2,906; Referee: Sivakorn Pu-udom; Assistant referees: Pattarapong Kijsathit, Chaowalit Poonprasit; Fourth official: Veeraporn Maophaeo |

=== Final ===
The final consists of 2 clubs, both from the T1. These clubs progressed to this stage after winning their respective matches in the semi-finals. 1 goal was scored in this round.

| 24 May 2026 | BG Pathum United (T1) | 0–1 | Port (T1) | Khlong Luang, Pathum Thani |
| 19:00 (UTC+7) | | Report; Highlight; Ceremony | Lucas Tocantins 29' | Stadium: Thammasat Stadium; Attendance: 16,807; Referee: Torphong Somsing; Assistant referees: Tanate Chuchuen, Komsan Kampan; Fourth official: Panumas Phansamo |

== Tournament statistics ==
=== Top goalscorers ===
| Rank | Player | Club | Goals |
|---|---|---|---|
| 1 | (Thailand) Teerasak Poeiphimai | Port | 5 |
| 2 | (Singapore) Ikhsan Fandi | BG Pathum United | 4 |
| 2 | (Thailand) Warayut Klomnak | Burapha United | 4 |
| 2 | (Thailand) Yotsakorn Burapha | Chonburi | 4 |
| 2 | (Colombia) Brayan Perea | Port | 4 |
| 6 | (Thailand) Teerasil Dangda | Bangkok United | 3 |
| 6 | (France) Shayn Djelloul Chekalil | Chachoengsao Hi-Tek | 3 |
| 6 | (Netherlands) Oege-Sietse van Lingen | Chonburi | 3 |
| 6 | (Ghana) Eric Kumi | Lopburi City | 3 |
| 6 | (Brazil) Jardel | Nongbua Pitchaya | 3 |

=== Hat-tricks ===
| Player | For | Against | Result | Date | Round |
|---|---|---|---|---|---|
| (Thailand) Warayut Klomnak | Burapha United (T3) | Saimit Kabin United (T3) | 6–0 (H) | 21 October 2025 | Second qualification round |
| (Brazil) Jardel | Nongbua Pitchaya (T2) | Khelang United (T3) | 6–1 (A) | 27 November 2025 | Qualification play-off round |
| (Thailand) Teerasak Poeiphimai^{4} | Port (T1) | Khon Kaen United (T2) | 7–0 (H) | 18 March 2026 | Quarter-finals |

Notes: ^{4} = Player scored 4 goals; (H) = Home team; (A) = Away team

== See also ==
- 2025–26 Thai League 1
- 2025–26 Thai League 2
- 2025–26 Thai League 3
- 2025–26 Thai League 3 Northern Region
- 2025–26 Thai League 3 Central Region
- 2025–26 Thai League 3 Northeastern Region
- 2025–26 Thai League 3 Eastern Region
- 2025–26 Thai League 3 Western Region
- 2025–26 Thai League 3 Southern Region
- 2025–26 Thai League 3 National Championship
- 2025–26 Thai League 3 Cup
- 2025–26 Thai FA Cup
