= 2025 Thailand Semi-pro League =

3rd season of the Thailand Semi-pro League

- Season: 2025
- Dates: 15 March 2025 – 28 June 2025
- Champions: Banbueng City
- Promoted: Phichit United (Northern region); Chiangrai TSC (Northern region); Udon Banjan United (Northeastern region); EUMT (Northeastern region); Banbueng City (Eastern region); Singburi Warriors (Central region); Futera United (Central region); Samui United (Southern region); Chumphon United (Southern region)

The 2025 Thailand Semi-pro League is the third season of the Thailand Semi-pro League, serving as the official fourth tier of the Thai football league system. The league is organized by the Football Association of Thailand (FA Thailand) and managed by Thai League Co., Ltd.

A total of 40 clubs compete in the season, with each club required to meet the Semi-pro Club Licensing requirements. Admission is based on an application process conducted by the league organizers. The season began on 15 March 2025 and concluded on 28 June 2025 with the Finals of the National Championship Stage.

The competition consists of two stages: the Regional Stage and the National Championship Stage. In the Regional Stage, clubs compete within their respective regional zones, with the top-ranked club in each region earning promotion to Thai League 3 for the following season and qualification for the National Championship Stage. The six regional champions then compete for the national title.

== Stadiums and locations ==
=== Northern region ===
Team	Location	Stadium	Coordinates
Chiangrai TSC	Chiang Rai (Mueang)	Stadium of Chiang Rai Rajabhat University	19°59′26″N 99°51′00″E
INDY Wichianburi	Phetchabun (Mueang)	Stadium of Thailand National Sports University, Phetchabun Campus	16°26′54″N 101°09′02″E
Nakhon Mae Sai	Chiang Rai (Mueang)	Stadium of Chiang Rai Rajabhat University	19°59′26″N 99°51′00″E
Nan	Nan (Mueang)	Nan PAO. Stadium	18°47′33″N 100°46′32″E
Navamin	Lampang (Ko Kha)	New Lampang Provincial Stadium	18°12′03″N 99°25′24″E
Paknampho	Nakhon Sawan (Mueang)	Stadium of Nakhon Sawan Sports School	15°44′33″N 100°07′56″E
Phetchabun United	Phetchabun (Mueang)	Phetchabun Provincial Stadium	16°26′57″N 101°09′53″E
Phichit United	Phichit (Mueang)	Phichit Stadium	16°26′35″N 100°19′26″E

=== Northeastern region ===
Team	Location	Stadium	Coordinates
EUMT	Ubon Ratchathani (Mueang)	UMT Stadium	15°15′49″N 104°50′35″E
Kalasin United	Kalasin (Mueang)	Kalasin Provincial Stadium	16°25′02″N 103°31′13″E
Mahasarakham SWL	Maha Sarakham (Mueang)	Stadium of Maha Sarakham Rajabhat University	16°11′55″N 103°16′26″E
Nakhon Phanom United	Nakhon Phanom (Mueang)	Stadium of Nakhon Phanom University	17°23′54″N 104°43′29″E
Nakhon Ratchasima College	Nakhon Ratchasima (Mueang)	Stadium of Nakhon Ratchasima Rajabhat University	14°59′07″N 102°06′53″E
Nongkhai	Nong Khai (Mueang)	Nong Khai Provincial Stadium	17°51′56″N 102°44′18″E
Pitchaya Bundit College	Nong Bua Lamphu (Mueang)	Pitchaya Stadium	17°11′52″N 102°26′00″E
Ubon Kids City	Ubon Ratchathani (Khueang Nai)	Stadium of Ubon Ratchathani Rajabhat University, Ban Yang Noi Campus	15°20′58″N 104°37′46″E
UD Vessuwan	Udon Thani (Mueang)	Udon Thani SAT Stadium	17°26′54″N 102°54′59″E
Udon Banjan United	Udon Thani (Mueang)	Udon Thani SAT Stadium	17°26′54″N 102°54′59″E
Vongchavalitkul University	Nakhon Ratchasima (Mueang)	Stadium of Vongchavalitkul University	15°00′14″N 102°06′50″E
Warin Chamrap	Ubon Ratchathani (Warin Chamrap)	Stadium of Ubon Ratchathani University	15°07′36″N 104°55′04″E

=== Eastern region ===
Team	Location	Stadium	Coordinates
Banbueng	Chonburi (Ban Bueng)	Chang Football Park	13°18′09″N 101°12′25″E
Banbueng City	Chonburi (Ban Bueng)	Banbueng Town Municipality Stadium	13°19′06″N 101°06′59″E
Bangsaen	Chonburi (Mueang)	Saensuk Town Municipality Stadium	13°18′05″N 100°55′22″E
Bankaeng United	Sa Kaeo (Mueang)	Sa Kaeo PAO. Stadium	13°46′21″N 102°10′43″E
Huasamrong Gateway	Chachoengsao (Bang Khla)	Stadium of Rajabhat Rajanagarindra University, Bang Khla Campus	13°47′01″N 101°14′10″E
Nakhon Nayok	Nakhon Nayok (Mueang)	Nakhon Nayok PAO. Stadium	14°12′52″N 101°10′45″E
Sriracha	Chonburi (Si Racha)	Stadium of Rajamangala University of Technology Tawan-ok	13°13′39″N 100°57′29″E

=== Central region ===
Team	Location	Stadium	Coordinates
Ayutthaya PK	Phra Nakhon Si Ayutthaya (Phra Nakhon Si Ayutthaya)	Stadium of Rajamangala University of Technology Suvarnabhumi, Huntra Campus	14°22′35″N 100°36′23″E
Bangkapi	Bangkok (Bang Kapi)	Stadium of Ramkhamhaeng University	13°45′16″N 100°37′00″E
Futera United	Pathum Thani (Khlong Luang)	Stadium of Valaya Alongkorn Rajabhat University under the Royal Patronage	14°08′00″N 100°36′25″E
Khunsuek Saraburi	Saraburi (Mueang)	Saraburi Stadium	14°33′24″N 100°54′18″E
Lopburi PT United	Lopburi (Mueang)	Jaifah Academy Stadium	14°48′53″N 100°46′05″E
Police Ladkrabang	Bangkok (Lak Si)	NT Stadium	13°53′03″N 100°34′37″E
Singburi Warriors	Singburi (Mueang)	Singburi PAO. Stadium	14°53′40″N 100°24′39″E

=== Western region ===
Team	Location	Stadium	Coordinates
Karin United	Nakhon Pathom (Phutthamonthon)	Stadium of Rajamangala University of Technology Rattanakosin	13°47′48″N 100°17′54″E
Photharam	Ratchaburi (Mueang)	Ratchaburi Provincial Stadium	13°31′54″N 99°48′50″E
Sathorn	Nakhon Pathom (Phutthamonthon)	Stadium of Suan Sunandha Rajabhat University, Nakhon Pathom Campus	13°52′05″N 100°16′12″E
The Wall	Suphanburi (Sam Chuk)	Stadium of Rajamangala University of Technology Suvarnabhumi, Suphanburi Campus	14°43′06″N 100°06′33″E

=== Southern region ===
Team	Location	Stadium	Coordinates
Chumphon United	Chumphon (Mueang)	Stadium of Thailand National Sports University, Chumphon Campus	10°27′23″N 99°07′45″E
Samui United	Surat Thani (Ko Samui)	Ko Samui City Municipality International Stadium	9°26′06″N 100°00′27″E

== Regional stage ==
The league is divided into six regional zones, following the structure of Thai League 3. The number of clubs in each region is determined by the number of clubs that meet the licensing criteria. The Northern Region has 8 clubs, the Northeastern Region has 12 clubs, the Eastern Region has 7 clubs, the Central Region has 7 clubs, the Western Region has 4 clubs, and the Southern Region has 2 clubs, making a total of 40 clubs. The competition format for the Regional Stage varies across regions: the Northern, Eastern, and Central Regions follow a single round-robin format, with each club playing 6–7 matches; the Northeastern Region also uses a round-robin format, but with 11 matches per club; the Western Region employs a double round-robin format (home and away), with each club playing 6 matches; and the Southern Region uses a quadruple round-robin format, with each club playing 4 matches. At the end of the Regional Stage, the top club from each region earns promotion to Thai League 3 for the following season and advances to the National Championship Stage.

=== Northern region ===
League table

Pos	Team	Pld	W	D	L	GF	GA	GD	Pts	Promotion or qualification
1	Phichit United (C, P, Q)	7	5	2	0	18	4	+14	17	Promotion to 2025–26 Thai League 3 and qualification to the National Championship stage
2	Chiangrai TSC (P)	7	4	2	1	17	6	+11	14	Promotion to 2025–26 Thai League 3 (Note: Chiangrai TSC was promoted to Thai League 3 through an additional allocation, to increase the number of clubs in the Northern region from 11 in the 2024–25 season to 12 in the 2025–26 season.)
3	Nan	7	3	2	2	8	9	−1	11	
4	Nakhon Mae Sai	7	2	4	1	22	8	+14	10	
5	Paknampho	7	2	3	2	13	11	+2	9	
6	Navamin	7	2	1	4	10	16	−6	7 (Note: Navamin ahead on head-to-head points record; Navamin 3 pts, Phetchabun United 0 pts.)	
7	Phetchabun United	7	2	1	4	11	13	−2	7	
8	INDY Wichianburi	7	0	1	6	1	33	−32	1	

Source: Thai League
Rules for classification: 1) Points; 2) Head-to-head points; 3) Head-to-head goal difference; 4) Head-to-head goal scored; 5) Overall goal difference; 6) Overall goal scored; 7) Fair play points; 8) Play-off without extra time).
(C) Champions; (P) Promoted; (Q) Qualified for the phase indicated
Notes:

Results

Home \ Away	CRT	IDY	MSI	NAN	NVM	PNP	PBU	PCU
Chiangrai TSC	—	2–0	—	2–0	—	—	4–0	—
INDY Wichianburi	—	—	—	1–1	0–3	0–3	—	—
Nakhon Mae Sai	3–3	13–0	—	—	—	1–1	—	—
Nan	—	—	1–0	—	—	3–3	2–1	0–2
Navamin	0–4	—	2–2	0–1	—	—	—	2–4
Paknampho	1–1	—	—	—	4–1	—	—	0–2
Phetchabun United	—	4–0	1–3	—	1–2	3–1	—	—
Phichit United	2–1	7–0	0–0	—	—	—	1–1	—

Source: Thai League
Legend: Blue = home team win; Yellow = draw; Red = away team win.
For upcoming matches, an "a" indicates there is an article about the rivalry between the two participants.

=== Northeastern region ===
League table

Pos	Team	Pld	W	D	L	GF	GA	GD	Pts	Promotion or qualification
1	Udon Banjan United (C, P, Q)	11	11	0	0	37	3	+34	33	Promotion to 2025–26 Thai League 3 and qualification to the National Championship stage
2	EUMT (P)	11	7	2	2	38	10	+28	23 (Note: The mini-league points record; EUMT 7 pts (GD +2, GF 6), Pitchaya Bundit College 4 pts (GD 0, GF 1), Mahasarakham SWL 2 pts (GD −1, GF 3), Ubon Kids City 2 pts (GD −1, GF 1).)	Promotion to 2025–26 Thai League 3 (Note: Due to the promotion of Rasisalai United in the 2024–25 Thai League 3 Northeastern region, there must be one additional team in the 2025 Thailand Semi-pro League Northeastern region promoted to replace them.)
3	Pitchaya Bundit College	11	7	2	2	18	7	+11	23	
4	Mahasarakham SWL	11	7	2	2	42	14	+28	23	
5	Ubon Kids City	11	7	2	2	25	7	+18	23	
6	Warin Chamrap	11	5	1	5	14	12	+2	16	
7	Nongkhai	11	4	1	6	12	17	−5	13	
8	Nakhon Phanom United	11	2	3	6	11	27	−16	9	
9	UD Vessuwan	11	2	2	7	12	23	−11	8 (Note: The head-to-head record is tied; UD Vessuwan 1 pt (GD 0, GF 3), Vongchavalitkul University 1 pt (GD 0, GF 3). UD Vessuwan is ahead in the overall goals difference.)	
10	Vongchavalitkul University	11	2	2	7	11	29	−18	8	
11	Nakhon Ratchasima College	11	2	1	8	14	29	−15	7	
12	Kalasin United	11	1	0	10	7	63	−56	3	

Source: Thai League
Rules for classification: 1) Points; 2) Head-to-head points; 3) Head-to-head goal difference; 4) Head-to-head goal scored; 5) Overall goal difference; 6) Overall goal scored; 7) Fair play points; 8) Play-off without extra time).
(C) Champions; (P) Promoted; (Q) Qualified for the phase indicated
Notes:

Results

Home \ Away	EUM	KLU	SWL	NPM	NRC	NKI	PBC	UKC	UDV	UDB	VCU	WCP
EUMT	—	18–0	—	—	4–0	3–1	—	—	—	0–2	—	1–1
Kalasin United	—	—	—	—	2–3	0–5	1–4	—	0–3	0–7	2–0	—
Mahasarakham SWL	3–3	12–0	—	7–2	—	—	—	0–0	3–0	—	—	—
Nakhon Phanom United	0–2	3–1	—	—	1–1	—	—	0–2	—	—	—	0–3
Nakhon Ratchasima College	—	—	1–4	—	—	—	1–2	—	4–1	0–3	1–2	—
Nongkhai	—	—	0–3	0–0	3–2	—	—	0–1	—	—	2–1	0–1
Pitchaya Bundit College	0–1	—	1–0	4–0	—	2–0	—	0–0	—	—	—	—
Ubon Kids City	1–2	6–0	—	—	3–1	—	—	—	4–1	0–2	6–0	—
UD Vessuwan	2–1	—	—	2–2	—	0–1	0–1	—	—	—	—	0–2
Udon Banjan United	—	—	6–0	4–1	—	4–0	3–1	—	2–0	—	—	2–0
Vongchavalitkul University	0–3	—	1–7	1–2	—	—	1–1	—	3–3	1–2	—	—
Warin Chamrap	—	2–1	0–3	—	4–0	—	0–2	1–2	—	—	0–1	—

Source: Thai League
Legend: Blue = home team win; Yellow = draw; Red = away team win.
For upcoming matches, an "a" indicates there is an article about the rivalry between the two participants.

=== Eastern region ===
League table

Pos	Team	Pld	W	D	L	GF	GA	GD	Pts	Promotion or qualification
1	Banbueng City (C, P, Q)	6	5	1	0	31	5	+26	16	Promotion to 2025–26 Thai League 3 and qualification to the National Championship stage
2	Bankaeng United	6	5	0	1	11	4	+7	15	
3	Huasamrong Gateway	6	4	1	1	13	8	+5	13	
4	Banbueng	6	2	0	4	16	8	+8	6 (Note: The mini-league points record; Banbueng 3 pts (GD +5), Sriracha 3 pts (GD 0), Nakhon Nayok 3 pts (GD −5).)	
5	Sriracha	6	2	0	4	8	13	−5	6	
6	Nakhon Nayok	6	2	0	4	5	19	−14	6	
7	Bangsaen	6	0	0	6	4	31	−27	0	

Source: Thai League
Rules for classification: 1) Points; 2) Head-to-head points; 3) Head-to-head goal difference; 4) Head-to-head goal scored; 5) Overall goal difference; 6) Overall goal scored; 7) Fair play points; 8) Play-off without extra time).
(C) Champions; (P) Promoted; (Q) Qualified for the phase indicated
Notes:

Results

Home \ Away	BBG	BBC	BSN	BKG	HGW	NNY	SRC
Banbueng	—	1–3	—	0–1	—	6–0	—
Banbueng City	—	—	—	2–0	2–2	6–0	—
Bangsaen	1–8	0–11	—	—	—	—	0–3
Bankaeng United	—	—	3–1	—	2–1	—	2–0
Huasamrong Gateway	2–1	—	5–2	—	—	—	1–0
Nakhon Nayok	—	—	1–0	0–3	1–2	—	—
Sriracha	1–0	2–7	—	—	—	2–3	—

Source: Thai League
Legend: Blue = home team win; Yellow = draw; Red = away team win.
For upcoming matches, an "a" indicates there is an article about the rivalry between the two participants.

=== Central region ===
League table

Pos	Team	Pld	W	D	L	GF	GA	GD	Pts	Promotion or qualification
1	Singburi Warriors (C, P, Q)	6	4	2	0	11	3	+8	14	Promotion to 2025–26 Thai League 3 and qualification to the National Championship stage
2	Ayutthaya PK	6	3	2	1	9	6	+3	11	
3	Futera United (P)	6	2	3	1	10	11	−1	9	Promotion to 2025–26 Thai League 3 (Note: Futera United were promoted to the Thai League 3 Central region for the 2025–26 season following the relegation of AUU Inter Bangkok and Dome, who failed to meet club licensing requirements. The promotion right was initially allocated to Ayutthaya PK, runners-up of the 2024–25 Thailand Semi-pro League Central region, but the club also failed to pass licensing. Consequently, the place was awarded to Futera United, who had finished third in that competition.)
4	Lopburi PT United	6	2	2	2	8	8	0	8	
5	Police Ladkrabang	6	2	1	3	5	6	−1	7 (Note: Police Ladkrabang ahead on head-to-head points record; Police Ladkrabang 3 pts, Khunsuek Saraburi 0 pts.)	
6	Khunsuek Saraburi	6	2	1	3	8	8	0	7	
7	Bangkapi	6	0	1	5	1	10	−9	1	

Source: Thai League
Rules for classification: 1) Points; 2) Head-to-head points; 3) Head-to-head goal difference; 4) Head-to-head goal scored; 5) Overall goal difference; 6) Overall goal scored; 7) Fair play points; 8) Play-off without extra time).
(C) Champions; (P) Promoted; (Q) Qualified for the phase indicated
Notes:

Results

Home \ Away	AYA	BKP	FTU	KSR	LPT	PLL	SBW
Ayutthaya PK	—	1–0	2–2	—	2–0	—	—
Bangkapi	—	—	—	0–1	—	0–0	0–4
Futera United	—	3–1	—	0–4	2–2	—	—
Khunsuek Saraburi	1–1	—	—	—	—	1–2	0–1
Lopburi PT United	—	1–0	—	4–1	—	—	1–1
Police Ladkrabang	0–2	—	1–2	—	2–0	—	—
Singburi Warriors	3–1	—	1–1	—	—	1–0	—

Source: Thai League
Legend: Blue = home team win; Yellow = draw; Red = away team win.
For upcoming matches, an "a" indicates there is an article about the rivalry between the two participants.

=== Western region ===
League table

Pos	Team	Pld	W	D	L	GF	GA	GD	Pts	Qualification
1	The Wall (C, Q)	6	3	3	0	11	4	+7	12	Qualification to the National Championship stage (Note: Although The Wall, winners of the Thailand Semi-pro League Western region, were eligible for promotion to Thai League 3, the club failed to meet the required club licensing standards. As a result, no club from the Western region was promoted.)
2	Photharam	6	2	3	1	15	12	+3	9	
3	Karin United	6	1	2	3	9	13	−4	5 (Note: Karin United ahead on head-to-head points record; Karin United 4 pts, Sathorn 1 pt.)	
4	Sathorn	6	1	2	3	6	12	−6	5	

Source: Thai League
Rules for classification: 1) Points; 2) Head-to-head points; 3) Head-to-head goal difference; 4) Head-to-head goal scored; 5) Overall goal difference; 6) Overall goal scored; 7) Fair play points; 8) Play-off without extra time).
(C) Champions; (Q) Qualified for the phase indicated
Notes:

Results

Home \ Away	KRU	PTR	STR	WAL
Karin United	—	0–3	1–1	0–3
Photharam	3–3	—	3–1	1–1
Sathorn	0–5	4–2	—	0–1
The Wall	3–0	3–3	0–0	—

Source: Thai League
Legend: Blue = home team win; Yellow = draw; Red = away team win.
For upcoming matches, an "a" indicates there is an article about the rivalry between the two participants.

Note: The match between Karin United and The Wall on 19 April 2025 was awarded as a 0–3 win to The Wall after Karin United fielded an ineligible player.

=== Southern region ===
League table

Pos	Team	Pld	W	D	L	GF	GA	GD	Pts	Promotion or qualification
1	Samui United (C, P, Q)	4	2	2	0	6	2	+4	8	Promotion to 2025–26 Thai League 3 and qualification to the National Championship stage
2	Chumphon United (P)	4	0	2	2	2	6	−4	2	Promotion to 2025–26 Thai League 3 (Note: Due to the promotion of Songkhla and Pattani in the 2024–25 Thai League 3 Southern region, there must be 2 teams in the 2025 Thailand Semi-pro League Southern region promoted to replace them.)

Source: Thai League
Rules for classification: 1) Points; 2) Head-to-head points; 3) Head-to-head goal difference; 4) Head-to-head goal scored; 5) Overall goal difference; 6) Overall goal scored; 7) Fair play points; 8) Play-off without extra time).
(C) Champions; (P) Promoted; (Q) Qualified for the phase indicated
Notes:

Results

Home \ Away	CPU	SMU	CPU	SMU
Chumphon United	—	1–1	—	1–1
Samui United	2–0	—	2–0	—

Source: Thai League
Legend: Blue = home team win; Yellow = draw; Red = away team win.
For upcoming matches, an "a" indicates there is an article about the rivalry between the two participants.

== National Championship stage ==
The National Championship Stage is held after the completion of the Regional Stage. The six regional champions qualify for this stage, where they compete for the national championship title. The competition is divided into two groups based on geography. The Upper Region group consists of the champions from the Northern Region, Northeastern Region, and Eastern Region. The Lower Region group consists of the champions from the Central Region, Western Region, and Southern Region. Each group follows a single round-robin format, with every team playing two matches. The team that finishes first in each group advances to the Finals. The Finals are played as a two-legged home-and-away knockout tie, with the winner determined by the aggregate score. The winner is crowned the Thailand Semi-pro League Champion for the 2025 season.

=== Group stage ===
==== Upper region ====
Pos	Team	Pld	W	D	L	GF	GA	GD	Pts	Qualification	BBC	PCU	UDB
1	Banbueng City (Q)	2	2	0	0	4	2	+2	6	Qualification to the finals	—	—	2–1
2	Phichit United	2	1	0	1	2	2	0	3		1–2	—	—
3	Udon Banjan United	2	0	0	2	1	3	−2	0		—	0–1	—

Source: Thai League
Rules for classification: 1) Points; 2) Head-to-head points; 3) Goal difference; 4) Goals scored;).
(Q) Qualified for the phase indicated
31 May 2025
16:00 UTC+7
Matchday 1

Udon Banjan United	0–1	Phichit United
	Report	Abdulkordiri Hamid 39'

Udon Thani SAT Stadium,
Mueang, Udon Thani
Attendance: 300
Referee: Rutratchapoom Moolpong (Thailand)

8 June 2025
18:00 UTC+7
Matchday 2

Phichit United	1–2	Banbueng City
Ranyapakorn Konsanthia 52'	Report	Prawit Jittithaworn 27'; Tewarit Thogkamchum 45+5'

Phichit Stadium,
Mueang, Phichit
Attendance: 780
Referee: Thanison Onjiw (Thailand)

14 June 2025
16:00 UTC+7
Matchday 3

Banbueng City	2–1	Udon Banjan United
Vranon Tatiyaprapa 9'; Aekkarat Buarin 77'	Report	Pattaratron Buransuk 16'

Banbueng Town Municipality Stadium,
Ban Bueng, Chonburi
Attendance: 400
Referee: U-sen Yala (Thailand)

==== Lower region ====
Pos	Team	Pld	W	D	L	GF	GA	GD	Pts	Qualification	SMU	SBW	WAL
1	Samui United (Q)	2	1	1	0	2	0	+2	4	Qualification to the finals	—	2–0	—
2	Singburi Warriors	2	1	0	1	3	2	+1	3		—	—	3–0
3	The Wall	2	0	1	1	0	3	−3	1		0–0	—	—

Source: Thai League
Rules for classification: 1) Points; 2) Head-to-head points; 3) Goal difference; 4) Goals scored;).
(Q) Qualified for the phase indicated
31 May 2025
16:00 UTC+7
Matchday 1

Samui United	2–0	Singburi Warriors
Mika Chunuonsee 2', 43' (pen.)	Report

Ko Samui City Municipality International Stadium,
Ko Samui, Surat Thani
Attendance: 600
Referee: Farid Baenak (Thailand)

8 June 2025
16:00 UTC+7
Matchday 2

Singburi Warriors	3–0	The Wall
Preerapat Khampo 42' (o.g.); Pongbanchon To-ngam 87'; Kamon Maninuan 90+4'	Report

Singburi PAO. Stadium,
Mueang, Singburi
Attendance: 255
Referee: Suthipong Teekhasuk (Thailand)

14 June 2025
16:00 UTC+7
Matchday 3

The Wall	0–0	Samui United
	Report

Stadium of Ragamangala University of Technology Suvarnabhumi, Suphanburi Campus,
Sam Chuk, Suphanburi
Referee: Kriangkrai Thiphanunjarukorn (Thailand)

=== Finals ===
==== Summary ====
Team 1	Agg.	Team 2	1st leg	2nd leg
Samui United	1–4	Banbueng City	1–1	0–3

==== Matches ====
===== 1st leg =====
21 June 2025
16:00 UTC+7
Finals 1st leg

Samui United	1–1	Banbueng City
Amornsin Phoonakhaw 90'	Report	Chanaphai Thewaphum 67'

Ko Samui City Municipality International Stadium,
Ko Samui, Surat Thani
Referee: Paisan Bendem-alee (Thailand)

Samui United	Banbueng City

Lineups:
GK	1	(Thailand) Suphatchai Hiranburana
RB	19	(Thailand) Chavarit Chimplee
CB	16	(Thailand) Mika Chunuonsee
CB	17	(Thailand) Pongthip Sribenjakul
LB	33	(Thailand) Kittiphat Lanhat
DM	21	(Thailand) Mahdee Chemah
DM	88	(Thailand) Attapon Chommaleethanawat
RM	69	(Thailand) Hasanbukhori Waesalaeh		(substituted off) 70'
AM	10	(Thailand) Amornsin Phoonakhaw	90'	(substituted off) 90+3'
LM	18	(Thailand) Songkitti Thongkam
CF	9	(Thailand) Amarin Chaisuesat (c)		(substituted off) 79'
Substitutes:
GK	39	(Thailand) Worawit Promchuay
DF	2	(Thailand) Phakphum Makenzie
DF	3	(Thailand) Eekarat Chareongul
DF	13	(Thailand) Jakkarin Chookorn
DF	28	(Thailand) Alongkorn Kilapsithongkham
DF	30	(Thailand) Thanthawach O-aeim
MF	6	(Thailand) Korarit Somnak		(substituted on) 90+3'
MF	25	(Thailand) Sorawit Saifa		(substituted on) 79'
MF	27	(Thailand) Anan Taitam
FW	11	(Thailand) Chadchapon Jet Jamplis		(substituted on) 70'
FW	77	(Thailand) Thawat Suksomboon
Head Coach:
(Brazil) Jonathas Henrique de Freitas Candido

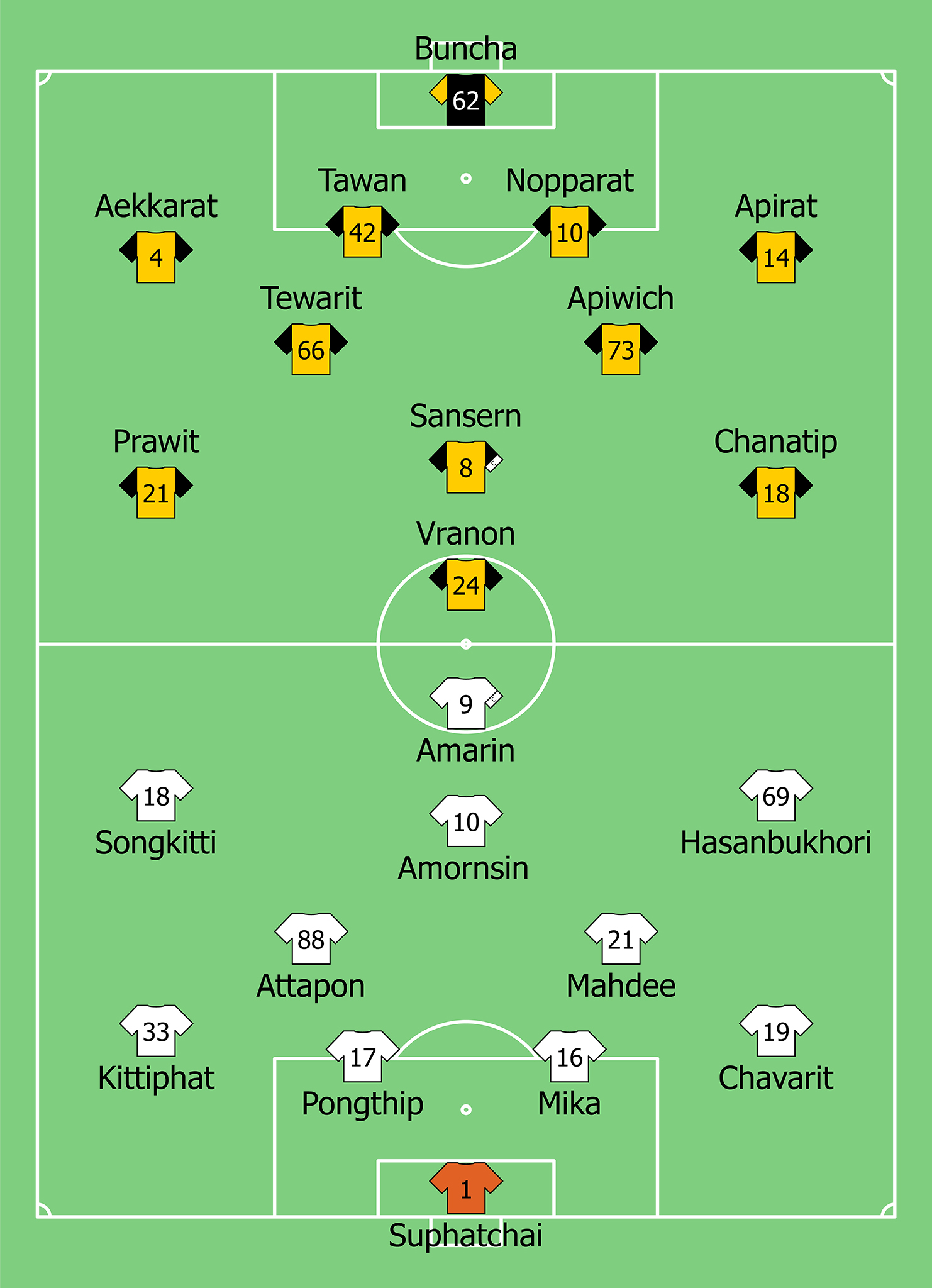

Lineups:
GK	62	(Thailand) Buncha Yimchoi
RB	4	(Thailand) Aekkarat Buarin			(substituted off) 76'
CB	42	(Thailand) Tawan Chanthasen
CB	10	(Thailand) Nopparat Sakun-ood		(yellow card) 57'
LB	14	(Thailand) Apirat Heemkhao			(substituted off) 46'
DM	66	(Thailand) Tewarit Thogkamchum
DM	73	(Thailand) Apiwich Laorkhai			(substituted off) 66'
RM	21	(Thailand) Prawit Jittithaworn			(substituted off) 46'
AM	8	(Thailand) Sansern Limwattana (c)		(yellow card) 90+4'
LM	18	(Thailand) Chanatip Laimsuwan			(substituted off) 46'
CF	24	(Thailand) Vranon Tatiyaprapa
Substitutes:
GK	32	(Thailand) Kitisak Koedprang
DF	5	(Thailand) Sutayut Ura		(yellow card) 82'	(substituted on) 76'
DF	17	(Thailand) Tongchai Ponang
DF	29	(Thailand) Nadhawut Singharach
DF	89	(Thailand) Jeerapong Chamsakul			(substituted on) 46'
MF	7	(Thailand) Siwapong Jarernsin
MF	12	(Thailand) Chanaphai Thewaphum	67'		(substituted on) 66'
MF	19	(Thailand) Farid Madsoh
MF	35	(Thailand) Chumpon Katanon
MF	88	(Thailand) Kunkawee Manphian
FW	15	(Thailand) Ekkachai Rittipan			(substituted on) 46'
FW	27	(Thailand) Pittawat Nudod			(substituted on) 46'
Head Coach:
(Thailand) Pasakorn Kanthak

===== 2nd leg =====
28 June 2025
15:30 UTC+7
Finals 2nd leg

Banbueng City	3–0	Samui United
Tewarit Thogkamchum 45', 57'; Apirat Heemkhao 45+2'	Report

Banbueng Town Municipality Stadium,
Ban Bueng, Chonburi
Attendance: 680
Referee: Satchukorn Saenchu (Thailand)

Banbueng City	Samui United

Lineups:
GK	62	(Thailand) Buncha Yimchoi
RB	4	(Thailand) Aekkarat Buarin			(substituted off) 46'
CB	42	(Thailand) Tawan Chanthasen
CB	89	(Thailand) Jeerapong Chamsakul			(substituted off) 77'
LB	14	(Thailand) Apirat Heemkhao	45+2'
DM	73	(Thailand) Apiwich Laorkhai
CM	8	(Thailand) Sansern Limwattana (c)
CM	66	(Thailand) Tewarit Thogkamchum	45', 57'
RF	15	(Thailand) Ekkachai Rittipan		(yellow card) 34'	(substituted off) 69'
CF	24	(Thailand) Vranon Tatiyaprapa			(substituted off) 46'
LF	21	(Thailand) Prawit Jittithaworn			(substituted off) 87'
Substitutes:
GK	32	(Thailand) Kitisak Koedprang
DF	2	(Thailand) Wicha Nantasri
DF	5	(Thailand) Sutayut Ura			(substituted on) 69'
DF	17	(Thailand) Tongchai Ponang
MF	7	(Thailand) Siwapong Jarernsin
MF	12	(Thailand) Chanaphai Thewaphum			(substituted on) 77'
MF	18	(Thailand) Chanatip Laimsuwan			(substituted on) 46'
MF	35	(Thailand) Chumpon Katanon			(substituted on) 87'
FW	27	(Thailand) Pittawat Nudod			(substituted on) 46'
Head Coach:
(Thailand) Pasakorn Kanthak

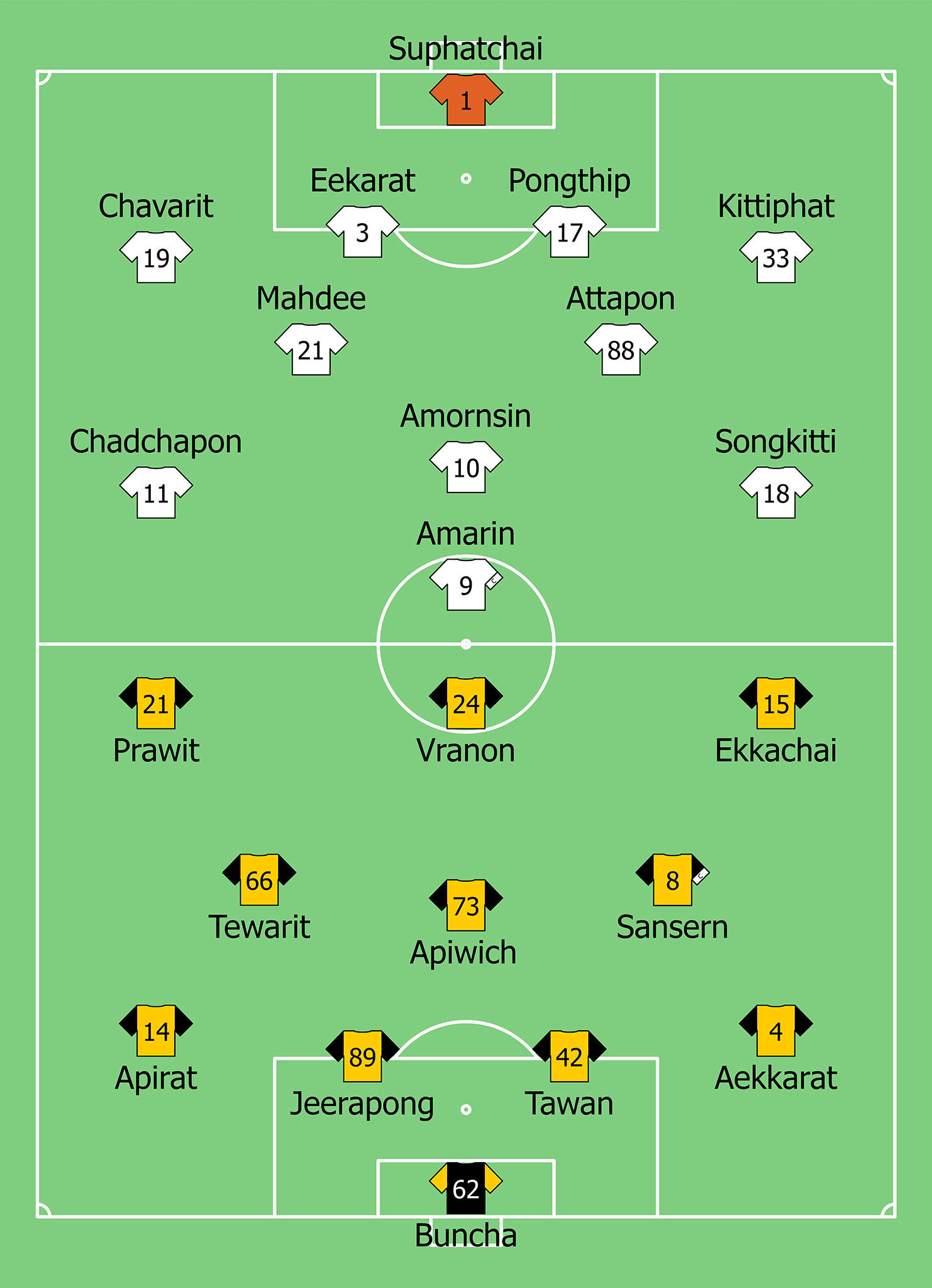

Lineups:
GK	1	(Thailand) Suphatchai Hiranburana
RB	19	(Thailand) Chavarit Chimplee
CB	3	(Thailand) Eekarat Chareongul		(substituted off) 64'
CB	17	(Thailand) Pongthip Sribenjakul		(substituted off) 90'
LB	33	(Thailand) Kittiphat Lanhat		(substituted off) 90'
DM	21	(Thailand) Mahdee Chemah
DM	88	(Thailand) Attapon Chommaleethanawat
RM	11	(Thailand) Chadchapon Jet Jamplis		(substituted off) 46'
AM	10	(Thailand) Amornsin Phoonakhaw		(substituted off) 90'
LM	18	(Thailand) Songkitti Thongkam
CF	9	(Thailand) Amarin Chaisuesat (c)
Substitutes:
GK	39	(Thailand) Worawit Promchuay
DF	2	(Thailand) Phakphum Makenzie	(yellow card) 84'	(substituted on) 64'
DF	16	(Thailand) Mika Chunuonsee
DF	28	(Thailand) Alongkorn Kilapsithongkham		(substituted on) 90'
MF	6	(Thailand) Korarit Somnak		(substituted on) 90'
MF	25	(Thailand) Sorawit Saifa		(substituted on) 90'
MF	27	(Thailand) Anan Taitam
MF	55	(Thailand) Natthakon Chamnian		(substituted on) 46'
Head Coach:
(Brazil) Jonathas Henrique de Freitas Candido

Banbueng City won 4–1 on aggregate.

== See also ==
- 2024–25 Thai League 1
- 2024–25 Thai League 2
- 2024–25 Thai League 3
- 2024–25 Thai League 3 Northern Region
- 2024–25 Thai League 3 Central Region
- 2024–25 Thai League 3 Northeastern Region
- 2024–25 Thai League 3 Eastern Region
- 2024–25 Thai League 3 Western Region
- 2024–25 Thai League 3 Southern Region
- 2024–25 Thai League 3 National Championship
- 2024–25 Thai FA Cup
- 2024–25 Thai League Cup
- 2024–25 Thai League 3 Cup
