= Burapha United F.C. =

Burapha United บูรพา ยูไนเต็ด
- Full name: Burapha United Football Club
- Founded: 2022; 4 years ago as Banbueng City F.C. 2025; 1 year ago as Burapha United F.C.
- Ground: Banbueng Town Municipality Stadium; Chonburi, Thailand
- Capacity: 3,000
- Coordinates: 13°19′06″N 101°06′59″E
- Owner(s): Banbueng City Co., Ltd.
- Chairman: Korlap Kangwonkit
- Head coach: Sukrit Yothee
- League: Thai League 3
- 2025–26: Thai League 3, 2nd of 12 in the Eastern region
- Website: Facebook

Burapha United Football Club (Thai สโมสรฟุตบอล บูรพา ยูไนเต็ด) is a Thai professional football club based in Ban Bueng, Chonburi. It was established in 2022 as Banbueng City Football Club. The club competes in Thai League 3, the third tier of Thai football league system.

== History ==
Burapha United Football Club was established in 2022 as Banbueng City Football Club with close ties to Chonburi F.C.. Initially, the club served as a platform for Chonburi F.C.'s youth players and local talents, aiming to bridge the gap between amateur and professional football. In its inaugural season, the club competed in the 2023 Thailand Semi-pro League in the Eastern region. The team played six matches, recording no wins, two draws, and four losses, finishing with just two points and placing seventh in the group. In the 2024 season, Banbueng City continued to compete in the Thailand Semi-pro League. The team showed significant improvement, playing seven matches with five wins, one draw, and one loss. They finished second in the Eastern region with 16 points, but narrowly missed promotion to Thai League 3, as only the regional champions advanced.

In the 2025 season, the club excelled in the Thailand Semi-pro League, playing six matches with five wins and one draw, remaining unbeaten throughout the campaign. They topped the Eastern region with 16 points, earning promotion to the Thai League 3 for the 2025–26 season. To strengthen the squad, the club signed Thailand national team defender Chalermsak Aukkee and rebranded as Burapha United Football Club in anticipation of their debut in the professional league.

== Stadium and locations ==
Coordinates	Location	Stadium	Year
13°19′06″N 101°06′59″E	Ban Bueng, Chonburi	Banbueng Town Municipality Stadium	2023 – present

== Season by season record ==
Season	League									FA Cup	League Cup	T3 Cup	Top goalscorer	
Season	Division	P	W	D	L	F	A	Pts	Pos	FA Cup	League Cup	T3 Cup	Name	Goals
2023	TS East	6	0	2	4	3	12	2	7th	Opted out	Ineligible	Ineligible	(Thailand) Apiwat Sukwinai	2
2024	TS East	7	5	1	1	15	5	16	2nd	Opted out	Ineligible	Ineligible	(Thailand) Siwapong Jarernsin	3
2025	TS East	6	5	1	0	31	5	16	1st	R1	Ineligible	Ineligible	(Thailand) Tewarit Thogkamchum	10
2025–26	T3 East	22	15	4	3	60	18	49	2nd	R1	QRP	LP	(Brazil) Elias Emanuel de Magalhães Souza	15

Champions	Runners-up	Promoted	Relegated

- P = Played
- W = Games won
- D = Games drawn
- L = Games lost
- F = Goals for
- A = Goals against
- Pts = Points
- Pos = Final position
- QR1 = First Qualifying Round
- QR2 = Second Qualifying Round
- R1 = Round 1
- R2 = Round 2
- R3 = Round 3
- R4 = Round 4
- R5 = Round 5
- R6 = Round 6
- QF = Quarter-finals
- SF = Semi-finals
- RU = Runners-up
- W = Winners

== Players ==
=== Current squad ===
As of 31 August 2026

Note: Flags indicate national team as defined under FIFA eligibility rules; some limited exceptions apply. Players may hold more than one non-FIFA nationality.

No.	Pos.	Nation	Player
1	GK	THA	Worawut Sukhuna
3	DF	JPN	Kazuki Murakami
4	DF	THA	Theerapat Laohabut
5	DF	THA	Sutayut Ura
7	FW	BRA	Matheus Souza
8	MF	THA	Sansern Limwattana (vice-captain)
9	FW	THA	Adisak Kraisorn (on loan from Chonburi)
10	FW	NGR	Chinonso Kingsley Thomas
12	MF	THA	Chanaphai Thewaphum
14	DF	THA	Apirat Heemkhao
15	FW	THA	Ekkachai Rittipan
16	MF	THA	Baramee Limwattana
17	DF	THA	Tongchai Ponang
18	MF	THA	Chanatip Laimsuwan
19	DF	THA	Arthit Buangam (on loan from Muangthong United)
21	FW	THA	Prawit Jittithaworn
22	GK	THA	Suphatchai Laothong

No.	Pos.	Nation	Player
23	DF	THA	Chalermsak Aukkee
24	FW	THA	Vranon Tatiyaprapa
27	FW	THA	Pittawat Nudod
29	DF	THA	Nadhawut Singharach
30	FW	THA	Ittidet Saenkiw
31	MF	THA	Pathomchai Sueasakul
32	GK	THA	Kitisak Koedprang
35	MF	THA	Chumpon Katanon
40	MF	THA	Kasidech Wettayawong
42	DF	THA	Tawan Chanthasen
47	MF	THA	Punyawat Tunmi
62	GK	THA	Buncha Yimchoi
66	MF	THA	Tewarit Thogkamchum
70	DF	THA	Isariya Marom
73	DF	THA	Apiwich Laorkhai
78	MF	THA	Kanapod Singsai
88	MF	THA	Teerawut Churok
89	DF	THA	Jeerapong Chamsakul
99	GK	THA	Nuttaporn Thaiyapongsakul

== Honours ==
=== Domestic competitions ===
==== League ====
- Thailand Semi-pro League
  - Winners (1) : 2025
