= Oege-Sietse van Lingen =

Dutch footballer (born 1999)

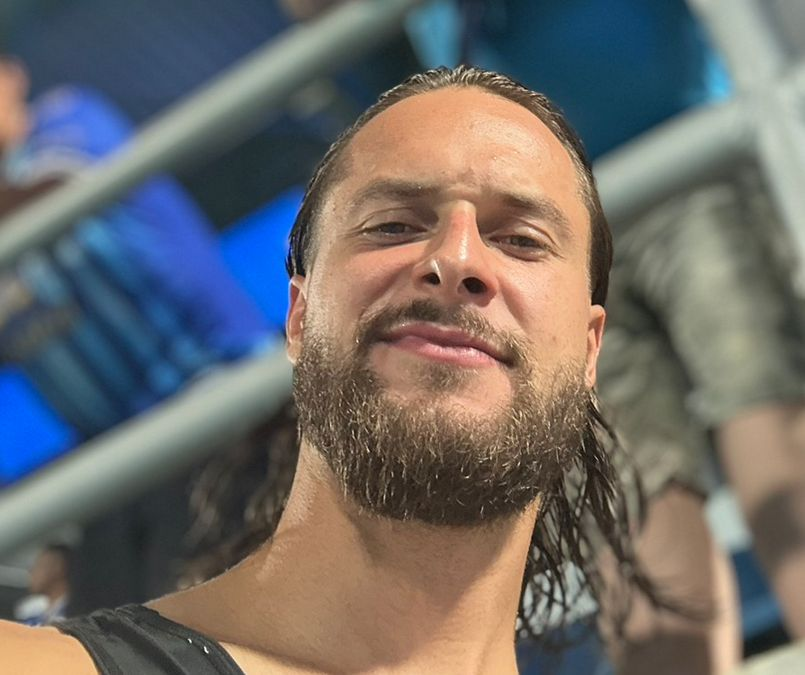

Personal information
- Date of birth: 21 October 1999 (age 27)
- Place of birth: Twijzelerheide, Netherlands
- Height: 1.82 m (6 ft 0 in)
- Position: Forward

Team information
- Current team: Urartu
- Number: 91

Youth career
- –2010: VVT
- 2010–2018: FC Groningen
- 2018–2019: SC Cambuur

Senior career*
Years	Team	Apps	(Gls)
2017–2018	Jong FC Groningen	12	(0)
2019–2020	ONS Sneek	22	(9)
2020–2022	VV Katwijk	17	(1)
2022–2023	Harkemase Boys	3	(0)
2023	FC Victoria Rosport	14	(6)
2023–2024	F91 Dudelange	28	(5)
2025	Suphanburi	12	(14)
2025–2026	Chonburi	29	(8)
2026–	Urartu	4	(2)
- * Club domestic league appearances and goals as of 19 October 2026

Oege-Sietse van Lingen (born 21 October 1999 in Twijzelerheide) is a Dutch professional footballer who plays as a forward for Armenian Premier League club Urartu.

== Early life ==
Van Lingen was born on 21 October 1999 in Twijzelerheide, Friesland in The Netherlands. He started playing football at the age of seven for the local football club VVT.

At the age of eight, he was scouted by SC Heerenveen, and a year later he joined FC Groningen.

== Club career ==
FC Groningen

From 2010 to 2018, he played in the youth academy of FC Groningen.

In 2017, at the age of 17, Van Lingen made his debut for the reserve team of Dutch side FC Groningen in the Derde Divisie. He played in total 12 matches in the Derde Divisie, while also featuring for the Under-19 team.

SC Cambuur

In 2018, he moved to SC Cambuur, where he played for the reserve team. In 16 matches, he scored 18 goals in the Dutch Reserve League, earning him the top scorer title.

ONS Sneek

In 2019, he signed for ONS Sneek in the Derde Divisie, the same league where he had previously played with FC Groningen U21. He scored nine goals and provided thirteen assists in 22 matches, before the season was ended due to the COVID-19 pandemic. He became the team's top scorer and won the Player of the Year award.

VV Katwijk

In 2020, he signed for VV Katwijk, which played in the Tweede Divisie. However, after five matches, the season was once again suspended due to the COVID-19 pandemic.

In the following season, he became the champion of the Tweede Divisie 2021/22 with VV Katwijk. Since the Netherlands, as one of the few countries in the world, does not have a promotion system between the Tweede Divisie and the Eerste Divisie, Van Lingen decided to terminate his contract after the championship to make the move abroad.

Harkemase Boys

However, the sought-after foreign professional club did not come through, so he decided to keep in shape and signed for Derde Divisie club Harkemase Boys. He played only three matches there before moving to Luxembourgish side Victoria Rosport.

Victoria Rosport

On January 31, 2023, Van Lingen signed with Victoria Rosport, marking his first club abroad. He arrived in the second half of the season and made an immediate impact, scoring seven goals and providing five assists in seventeen matches. Additionally, they reached the semi-finals of the Luxembourg Cup, where they were eliminated by the eventual cup winners, FC Differdange 03. His time at Victoria Rosport was limited to half a season, as he was sold to Luxembourg's top club, F91 Dudelange.

== UEFA Conference League ==
He made the transfer to Luxembourg's top club F91 Dudelange on June 18, 2023, where he signed a two-year contract. Van Lingen made his debut on July 12, 2023, in the UEFA Conference League qualifying round. In his debut match against Irish club St. Patrick's Athletic FC, he scored the opening goal in the 24th minute, which turned out to be the first goal of the 2023/24 UEFA Conference League season.

In the return leg, he scored a hat-trick in the 2–3 victory, making him the competition's top scorer at that moment with four goals in two matches.

F91 Dudelange was eliminated in the next round by Maltese club Gzira United. In the 2024/25 season, Van Lingen again participated in the UEFA Conference League, playing two matches against AC Escaldes from Andorra and Swedish side BK Häcken.

In total, he played 36 matches, scoring eleven goals and providing twelve assists, before leaving the top Luxembourg club.

== Thailand ==
Suphanburi FC

He signed for Thai club Suphanburi FC, where he scored a hat-trick in his first friendly match against the national team of Laos. On January 3, 2025, he was officially presented by the club, and two days later, he made his official debut in a match against Sisaket United. In this game, he scored four goals in the 6–1 victory, which immediately earned him cult status.

He finished the season at Suphanburi FC with 14 goals and 3 assists in 12 matches in Thai League 2. His outstanding performance earned him the Player of the Season award and a transfer to Thai League 1 side Chonburi FC.

Chonburi FC

On May 30, 2025, Van Lingen was officially presented by Thai League 1 club Chonburi FC.

During the 2025–26 season, he made 32 appearances in all competitions, scoring 12 goals and providing 7 assists for a total of 19 goal contributions. He finished the season as the club's top scorer and top assist provider, and was subsequently named in the club's Best XI.

== Electrocuted ==
On February 15, 2025, Van Lingen was named Man of the Match in a 0–3 away win against Pattaya United, where he scored one goal and provided an assist. However, he grabbed a faulty microphone during a post-match interview and was electrocuted by a high-voltage current. He feared for his life but survived the incident and quickly recovered.

After missing only one match, he returned to the field and immediately made an impact as a substitute in the away match against league leaders Ayutthaya United. Within two minutes, he provided an assist and later scored the equalizer, resulting in a 2–2 draw. Following this event, he earned the nickname "Electric Man."

== Honours ==
VV Katwijk

- Tweede Divisie: 2021–22

Individual

- UEFA Conference League: First goalscorer of the 2023/2024 season
- F91 Dudelange: Top Assist Provider 2023/2024
- Thai League 2 Player of the Month: January 2025
- Suphanburi FC: Player of the Season 2024/2025
- Suphanburi FC: Club Topscorer 2024/2025
- Chonburi FC: Club Topscorer 2025/2026
- Chonburi FC: Top Assist Provider 2025/2026
- Chonburi FC: Best XI 2025/26
