= Kazuki Murakami (footballer) =

Japanese footballer

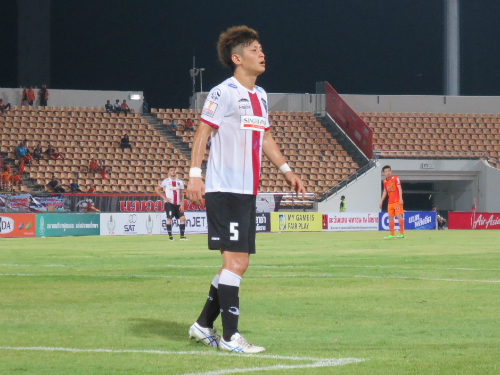

Personal information
- Full name: Kazuki Murakami
- Date of birth: December 21, 1987 (age 38)
- Place of birth: Ehime, Japan
- Height: 1.81 m (5 ft 11 1/2 in)
- Position: Centre-back

Team information
- Current team: Burapha United
- Number: 3

Youth career
- 2006–2009: Hiroshima University

Senior career*
Years	Team	Apps	(Gls)
2010–2012	FC Gifu	42	(0)
2013–2016	Chiangrai United	110	(1)
2017	PTT Rayong	23	(0)
2019–2021	Chainat Hornbill	45	(2)
2021–2022	Sisaket	28	(6)
2022–2023	Ayutthaya United	28	(1)
2024	North Bangkok University	16	(2)
2024–2025	Kasetsart	28	(1)
2025–	Burapha United	11	(0)
- * Club domestic league appearances and goals as of 17 March 2026

Kazuki Murakami (村上一樹, Murakami Kazuki; born December 21, 1987) is a Japanese football player for Burapha United in Thai League 3.

== Career statistics ==
Appearances and goals by club, season and competition
Club	Season	League			Emperor's Cup		Total	
Club	Season	Division	Apps	Goals	Apps	Goals	Apps	Goals
FC Gifu	2010	J2 League	16	0	1	0	17	0
FC Gifu	2011	J2 League	8	0	1	0	9	0
FC Gifu	2012	J2 League	18	0	0	0	18	0
Career total			42	0	2	0	44	0
