= Twijzelerheide =

Twijzelerheide Twizelerheide (West Frisian)
- Village
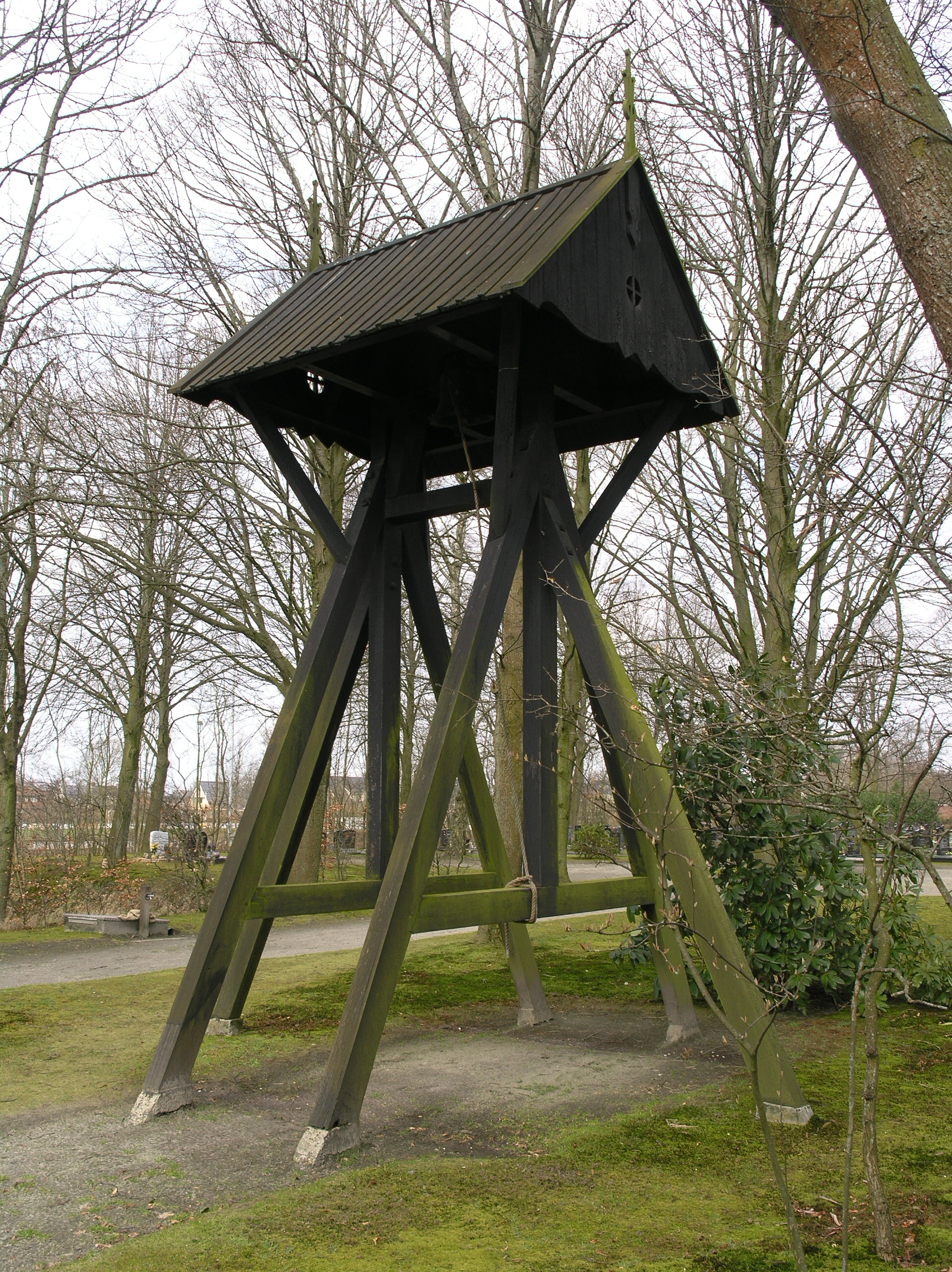
- Clock Tower

- Flag Coat of arms

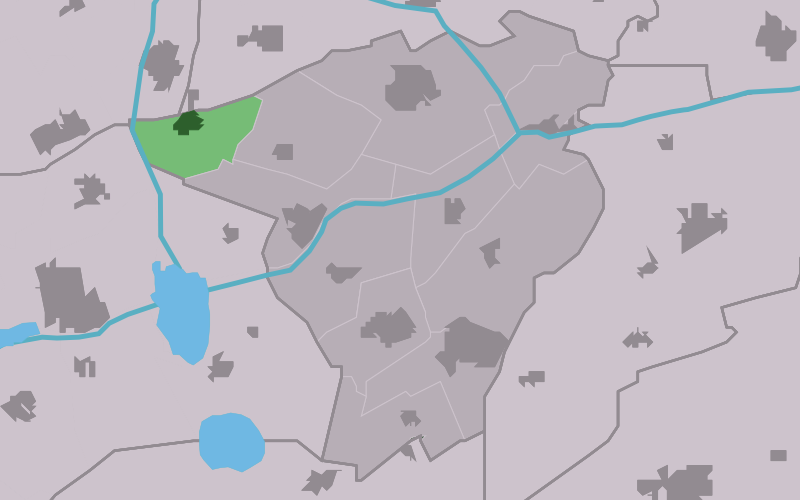
- Location in Achtkarspelen municipality

- Location in the Netherlands
- Country: Netherlands
- Province: Friesland
- Municipality: Achtkarspelen

Area
  - Total: 6.32 km^{2} (2.44 sq mi)
- Elevation: 1 m (3.3 ft)

Population (2021)
  - Total: 1,775
  - Density: 281/km^{2} (727/sq mi)
- Time zone: UTC+1 (CET)
  - Summer (DST): UTC+2 (CEST)
- Postal code: 9287
- Dialing code: 0512
- Website: Official

Twijzelerheide (West Frisian: Twizelerheide) is a village in Achtkarspelen in the province of Friesland, the Netherlands. It had a population of around 1800 in 2017.

A dialect of Wood Frisian, Westereendersk dialect, is spoken in this village.

The village was first mentioned in 1718 as heyde, and means "heath near Twijzel". Twijzelerheide developed in the 19th century as a heath cultivation project. The Dutch Reformed Church dates from 1878. Twijzelerheide and Zwagerbosch have grown together, and nowadays share resources and can be considered a twin village.

== Gallery ==
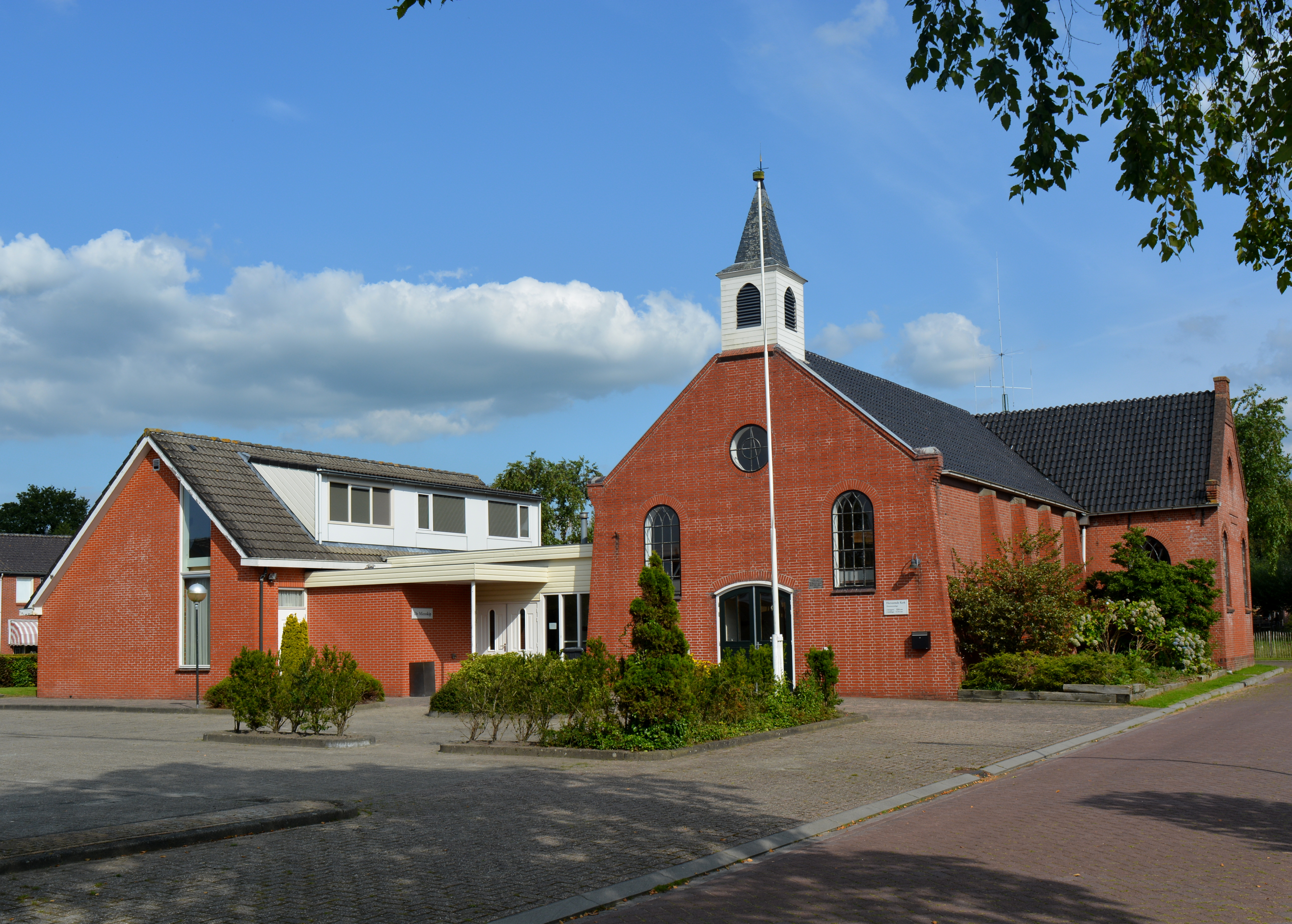
Dutch Reformed Church

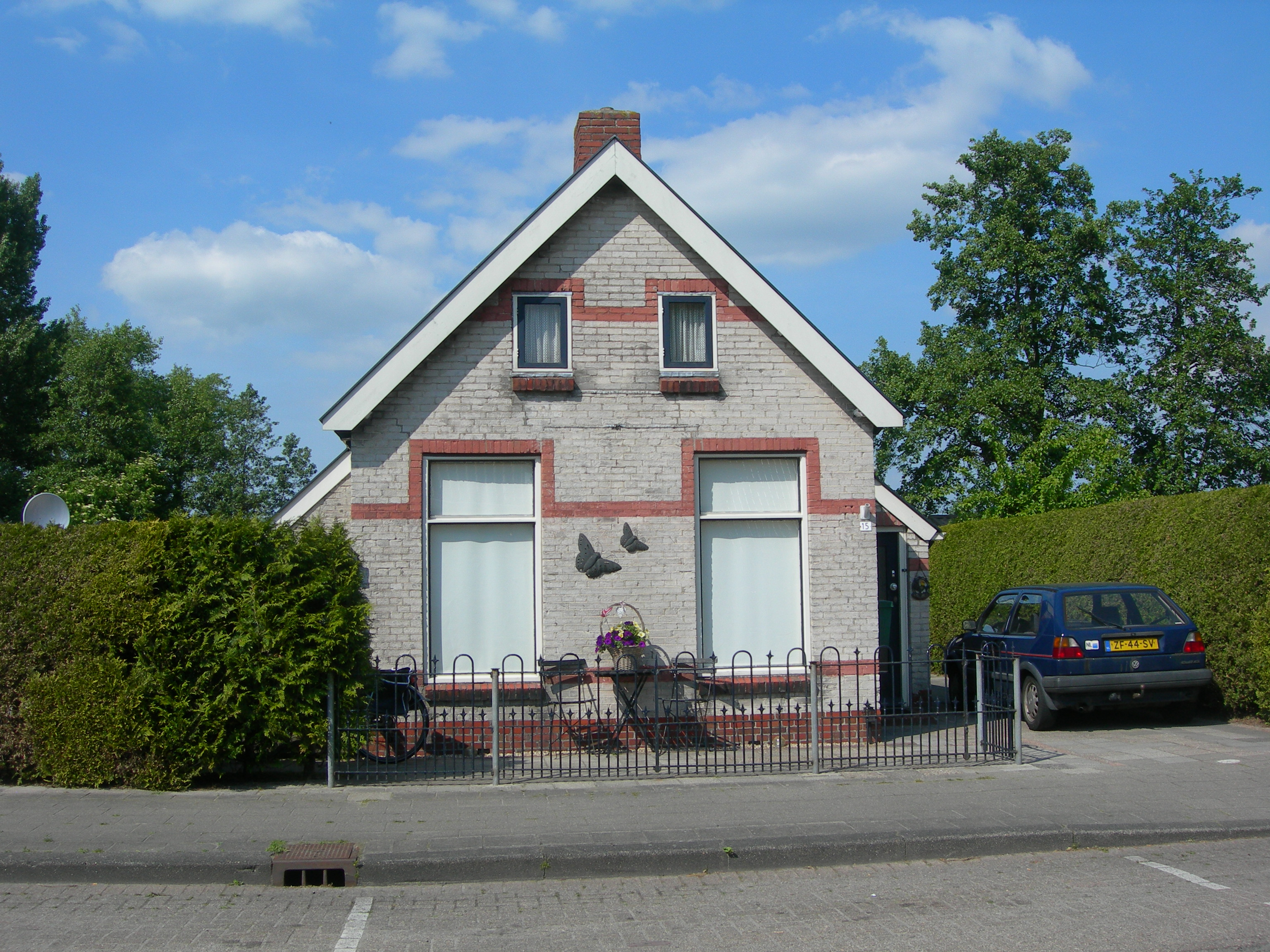
Little house

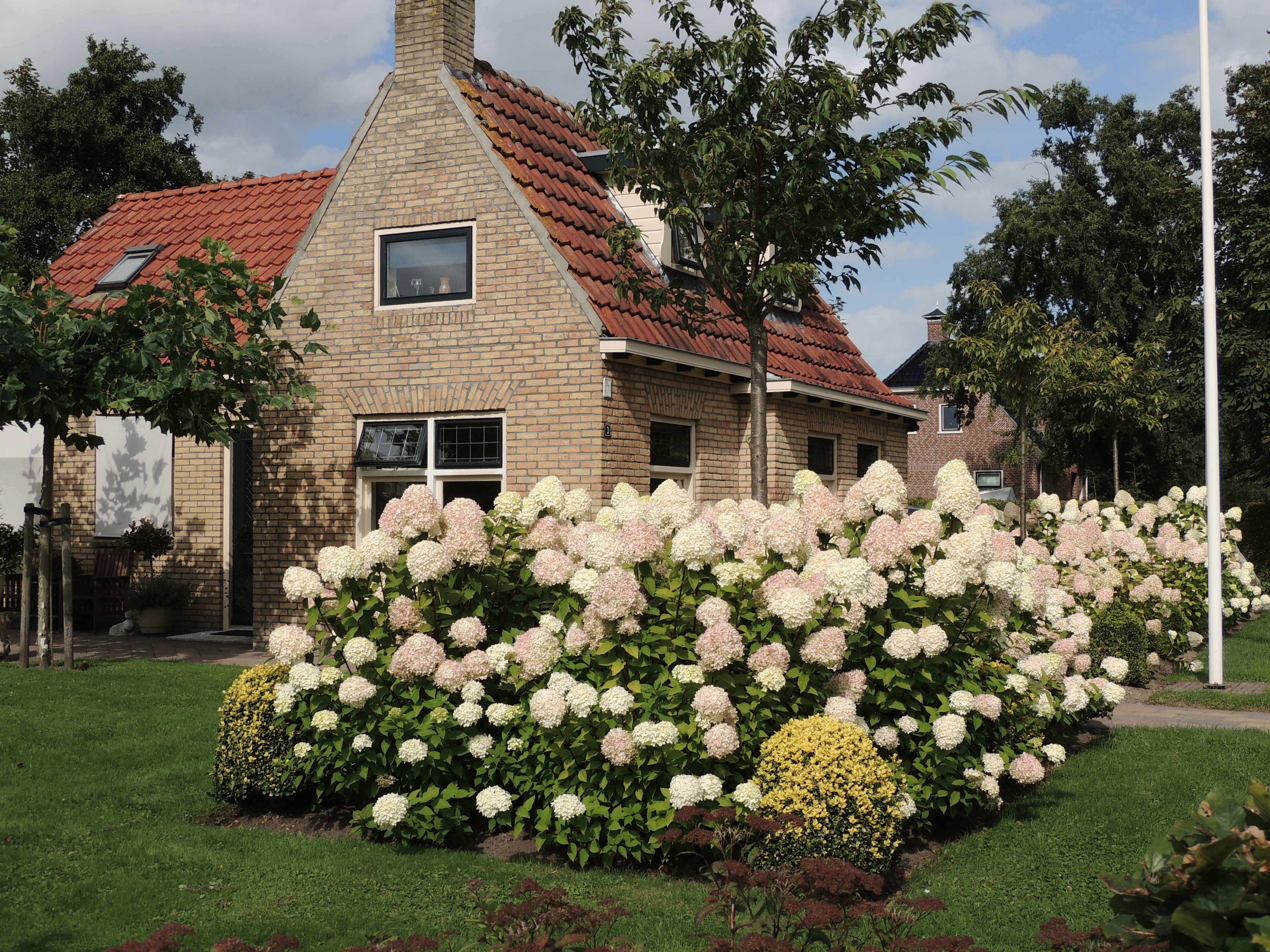
Flowers in the garden
