= Westereendersk =

Local dialect spoken in Friesland

Westereendersk is a local variety of Wood Frisian and is spoken in De Westereen, Zwagerbosch and Twijzelerheide. The most remarkable feature is the use of ee /eː/ where Wood Frisian and most other West Frisian dialects use ei or ij /ai/.

This sound change from /ai/ and sometimes /ɪ/ to /eː/ brings us some striking similarities with English in spoken or written texts as most differences to standard West Frisian also concern differences to English.

== Examples ==
| Westereendersk | Standard West Frisian | English |
|---|---|---|
| treen | trein | train |
| ween | wein | wagon |
| free | frij | free |
| sneë | snije | to cut |
| wood | wâld | forest |
| soot | sâlt | salt |

In the verbs lizze (to lie, to lay) and sizze (to say) and in the first person singular of these verbs the /ɪ/ is replaced by an /eː/. This phenomenon can also be found back in other parts of the Frisian Woods.

| Westereendersk | Standard West Frisian | English |
|---|---|---|
| leze | lizze | to lie/lay |
| ik lees | ik lis | I'm laying/lying |
| seze | sizze | to say |
| ik sees | ik sis | I'm saying |

== De Westereen ==
When the municipality of Dantumadiel chose for West Frisian names as official topographical names it was decided to replace the Dutch name Zwaagwesteinde by De Westereen instead of De Westerein. Towns like Zwagerbosch and Twijzelerheide also speak "Westereender Frisian".

However the village is called De Westerein by most other Frisians, its inhabitants are often called Westereenders.
