= Warayut Klomnak =

Thai footballer

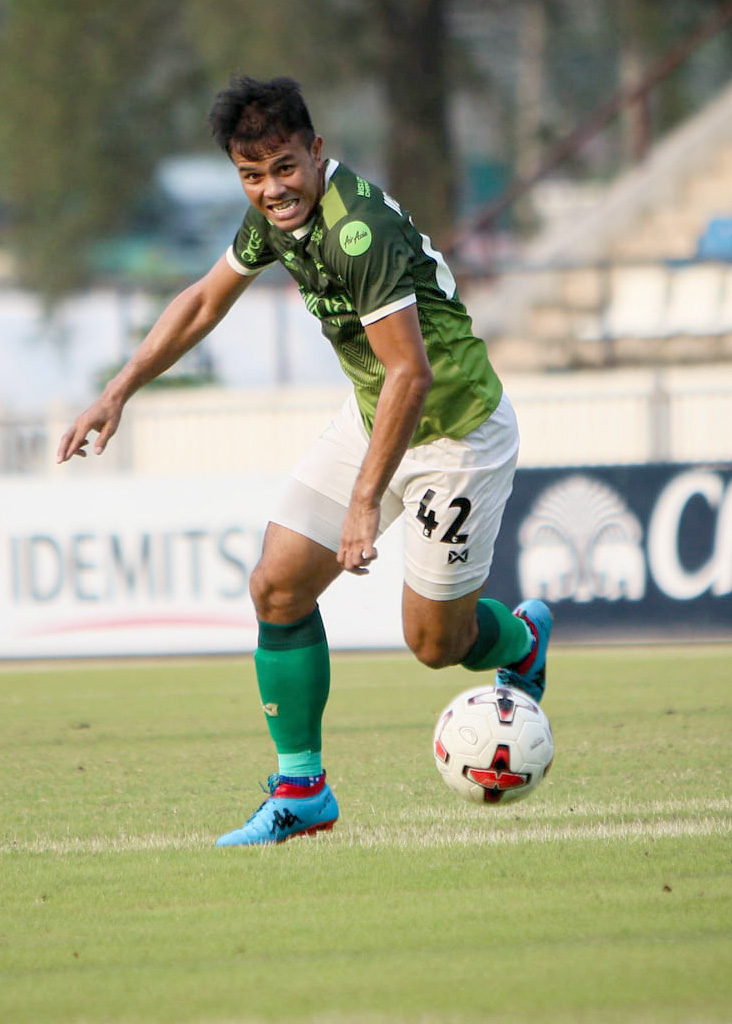

Personal information
- Date of birth: 30 May 1986 (age 40)
- Place of birth: Phuket, Thailand
- Position: Forward

Team information
- Current team: Burapha United
- Number: 65

Senior career*
Years	Team	Apps	(Gls)
2017	Samutsongkhram		
2018	Air Force United	14	(1)
2019	Nongbua Pitchaya	16	(1)
2020	Samut Sakhon	13	(2)
2021–2022	Chainat Hornbill	62	(16)
2023–2024	Chiangmai United	51	(12)
2024	Chanthaburi	12	(0)
2025	Samut Sakhon City	0	(0)
2025–	Burapha United	0	(0)
- * Club domestic league appearances and goals as of 1 January 2025

Warayut Klomnak (Thai: วรายุทธ กล่อมนาค; born May 30, 1986) is a Thai footballer who plays as a forward for Thai League 3 club, Burapha United.
