= Sweagerbosk =

- Village
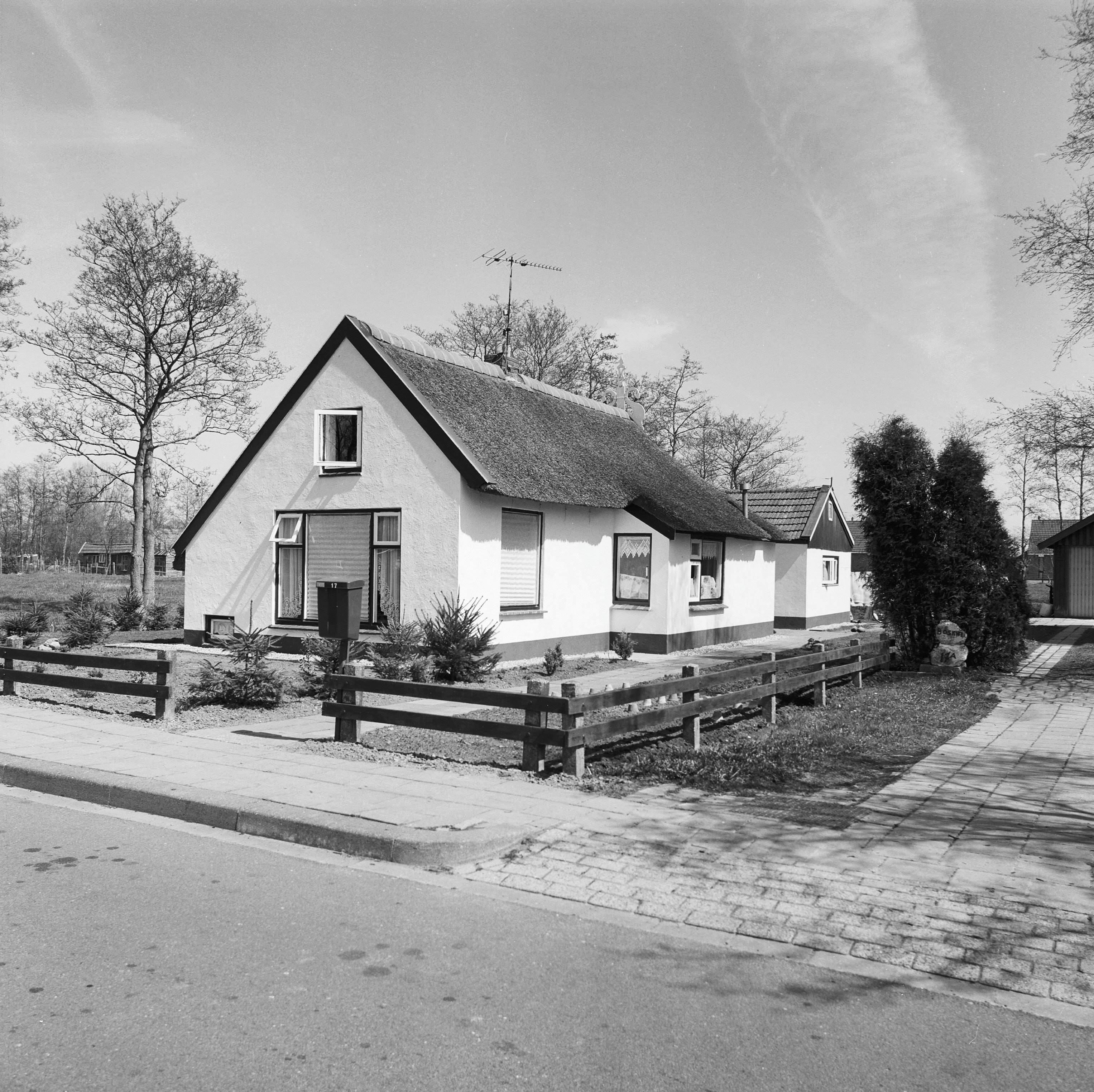
- Farm in Sweagerbosk

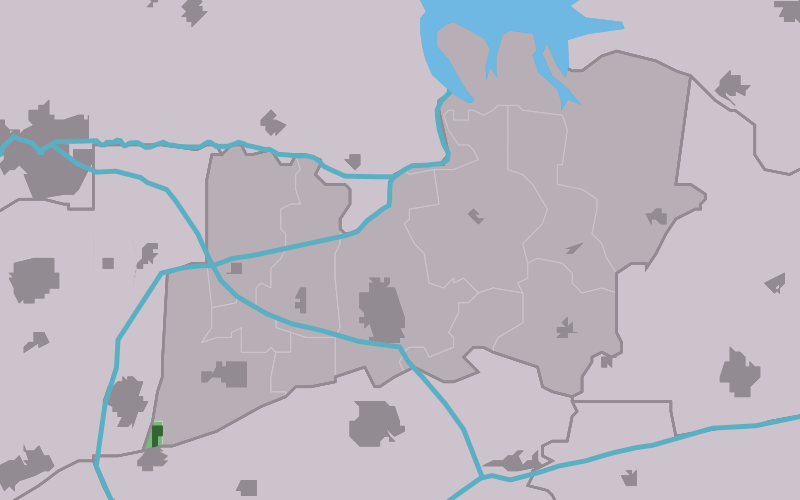
- Location in the former Kollumerland municipality

- Location in the Netherlands Sweagerbosk (Netherlands)
- Country: Netherlands
- Province: Friesland
- Municipality: Noardeast-Fryslân

Area
  - Total: 0.29 km^{2} (0.11 sq mi)
- Elevation: 0.9 m (3.0 ft)

Population (2021)
  - Total: 560
  - Density: 1,900/km^{2} (5,000/sq mi)
- Time zone: UTC+1 (CET)
  - Summer (DST): UTC+2 (CEST)
- Postal code: 9299
- Dialing code: 0511

Sweagerbosk (Dutch: Zwagerbosch, Low German: Swoagerbosk) is a village in Noardeast-Fryslân municipality in the province Friesland of the Netherlands. It had a population of around 638 in January 2017. Before 2019, the village was part of the Kollumerland en Nieuwkruisland municipality.

Its people speak a dialect of the standard Wood Frisian: Westereendersk dialect.

The village was first mentioned in 1861 as het Bosch, and means forest belonging to Kollumersweach. Settlement started in the 18th century. The region around Sweagerbosk consisted mainly of heath. In 1940, it was officially listed as a village.

The village's official name was changed from Zwagerbosch to Sweagerbosk in 2023.
