= Saranyu Plangwal =

Thai footballer (born 1999)

Personal information
- Date of birth: 28 May 1999 (age 27)
- Place of birth: Udon Thani, Thailand
- Height: 1.87 m (6 ft 2 in)
- Position: Defender

Team information
- Current team: Khelang United
- Number: 4

Youth career
- –2017: Udon Thani FC

Senior career*
Years	Team	Apps	(Gls)
2017	Bangkok Christian College FC	0	(0)
2018–2019	Muangthong United FC	0	(0)
2018	→ Bangkok FC (loan)	0	(0)
2019–2021	Udon Thani FC	25	(1)
2021–2022	Ayutthaya United FC	16	(0)
2022–2023	Trang FC	0	(0)
2024	Customs United FC	1	(0)
2025	PT Prachuap FC	0	(0)
2025	Phichit United	5	(0)
2026–	Khelang United	8	(0)

International career^{‡}
2018	Thailand U19	1	(0)
2018	Thailand U23	1	(0)
- * Club domestic league appearances and goals as of 22 March 2026 ‡ National team caps and goals as of 28 October 2018

Saranyu Plangwal (Thai: ศรัญญู พลางวัล; born 28 May 1999) is a Thai professional footballer who plays as a defender for Thai League 3 club Khelang United.

== Career ==
As a youth player, Plangwal joined the youth academy of Udon Thani FC. In 2017, he signed for Bangkok Christian College FC. Six months later, he signed for Muangthong United FC, where he made zero league appearances and scored zero goals. The same year, he was sent on loan to Bangkok FC. Six months later, he returned to Udon Thani FC, where he made twenty-five league appearances and scored one goal.

Ahead of the 2021–22 season he signed for Ayutthaya United FC, where he made sixteen league appearances and scored zero goals. On 15 September 2021, he debuted for the club during a 1–2 away loss to Muangkan United FC in the league. One year later, he signed for Trang FC. During the summer of 2024, he signed for Customs United FC before signing for PT Prachuap FC in 2025.

== Personal life ==
Plangwal was born on 28 May 1999 in Udon Thani, Thailand to a Senegalese father and a Thai mother. Growing up, he attended in Phandonwittaya School Thailand. Nicknamed "Joker", he has worked as a rapper by the name of Joker DMT.
