= Ekkachai Rittipan =

Thai footballer (born 1990)

Personal information
- Full name: Ekkachai Rittipan
- Date of birth: 23 May 1990 (age 36)
- Place of birth: Surat Thani, Thailand
- Height: 1.70 m (5 ft 7 in)
- Position: Winger

Youth career
- 2007–2008: Chonburi

Senior career*
Years	Team	Apps	(Gls)
2008–2011	Sriracha	39	(16)
2012–2013	TOT	40	(5)
2014	Army United	14	(3)
2015	Suphanburi	12	(1)
2015	→ BEC Tero Sasana (loan)	8	(3)
2016–2018	BEC Tero Sasana	5	(0)
2016	→ Chiangrai United (loan)	8	(0)
2017	→ Nakhon Ratchasima (loan)	10	(0)
2018	Nakhon Ratchasima	29	(4)
2019	Chonburi	2	(0)
2019	→ Trat (loan)	3	(0)
2023–2024	Banbueng City	12	(3)
2025	Burapha United	4	(0)

International career
2008–2009	Thailand U19		
- * Club domestic league appearances and goals as of 05:02, 15 October 2018 (UTC)

Ekkachai Rittipan (Thai: เอกชัย ฤทธิพันธ์, born May 23, 1990), simply known as Puen (Thai: ปืน), is a Thai professional footballer who plays as a winger.
