= Buncha Yimchoi =

Thai footballer

Personal information
- Full name: Buncha Yimchoi
- Date of birth: 24 May 1990 (age 36)
- Place of birth: Thailand
- Height: 1.81 m (5 ft 11 1/2 in)
- Position: Goalkeeper

Team information
- Current team: Kasetsart
- Number: 62

Youth career
- 2010: Angthong

Senior career*
Years	Team	Apps	(Gls)
2011–2014	Angthong	35	(0)
2015–2016	Bangkok United	0	(0)
2016–2018	Thai Honda Ladkrabang	25	(0)
2018	Pattaya United	3	(0)
2019	Air Force United	2	(0)
2020–2021	Uthai Thani	13	(0)
2021–2022	Pathumthani University	19	(0)
2022–	Kasetsart	10	(0)
- * Club domestic league appearances and goals as of 30 April 2023

Buncha Yimchoi (Thai: บัญชา ยิ้มช้อย, born May 24, 1990) is a Thai professional footballer who plays as a goalkeeper.
