= Apirat Heemkhao =

Thai footballer

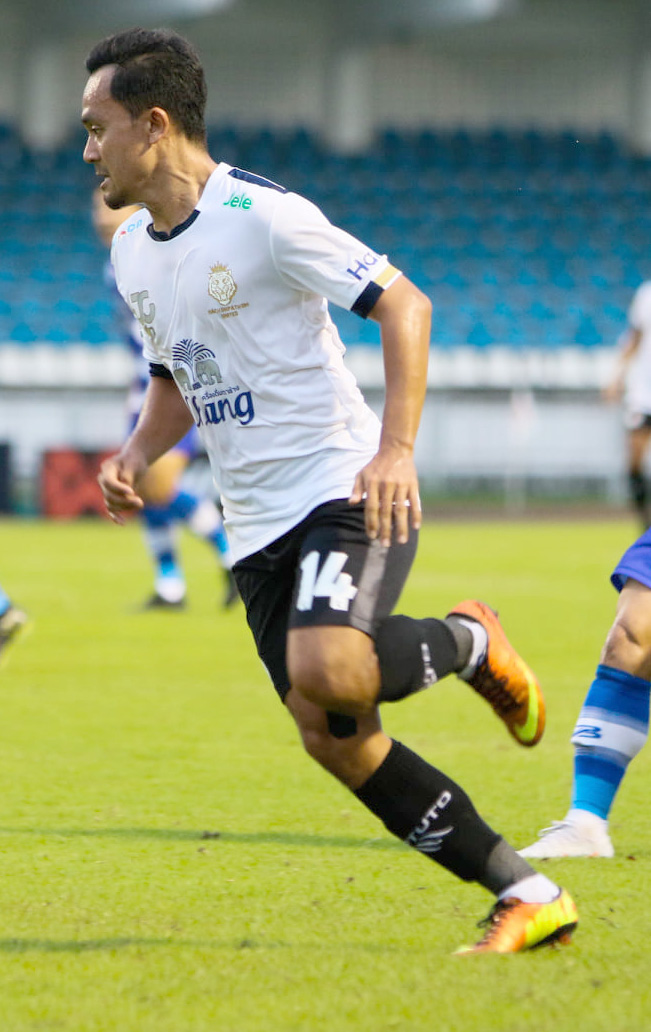
- Apirat Heemkhao in 2021

Personal information
- Full name: Apirat Heemkhao
- Date of birth: February 25, 1993 (age 33)
- Place of birth: Rayong, Thailand
- Height: 1.67 m (5 ft 5 1/2 in)
- Positions: Midfielder; winger

Team information
- Current team: Bankhai United
- Number: 9

Youth career
- 2009–2011: Assumption College Sriracha
- 2011–2012: Chonburi

Senior career*
Years	Team	Apps	(Gls)
2012–2014	Chonburi	0	(0)
2013	→ Rayong United (loan)	16	(1)
2014	→ Trat (loan)	17	(2)
2015–2017	Prachuap	60	(15)
2018	Air Force Central	1	(0)
2018	Ayutthaya United		
2019	Pattani		
2020	Kasetsart		
2021–2022	Nakhon Pathom United		
2022	Rayong	5	(0)
2023–2024	BFB Pattaya City	0	(0)
2024–	Bankhai United	5	(0)
- * Club domestic league appearances and goals as of 30 October 2024

Apirat Heemkhao (Thai: อภิรัตน์ หีมขาว, born February 25, 1993), simply known as "Don" (Thai: ดอน), is a Thai professional footballer.
