= Banbueng Municipal Stadium =

Stadium in Chonburi, Thailand

Coordinates: 13.318501°N 101.116197°E

- Interactive map of Banbueng Municipal Stadium
- Location: Chonburi, Thailand
- Owner: Banbueng Municipality
- Operator: Banbueng Municipality
- Capacity: 2,000
- Surface: Grass

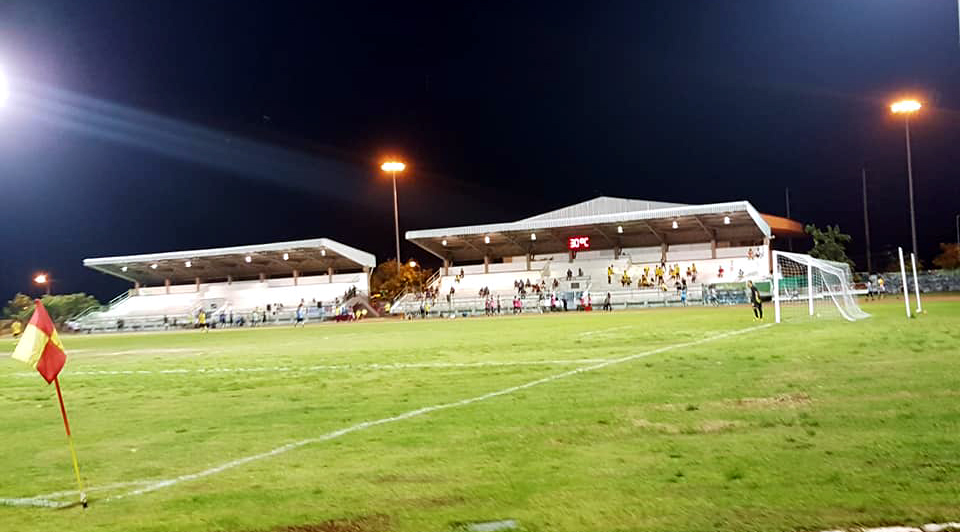

Banbueng Municipal Stadium (Thai: สนามเทศบาลเมืองบ้านบึง) is a multi-purpose stadium in Chonburi Province, Thailand. It is currently used mostly for football matches. The stadium holds 2,000 people.
