= 2026–27 Thai U21 League =

Thai U21 League
- Season: 2026–27
- Dates: 15 September 2026 – TBD 2027

The 2026–27 Thai U21 League was the 3rd season of the Youngster League and the second to be played under the under-21 format, officially known for sponsorship reasons as the PEA U21 Youngster League, named after the Provincial Electricity Authority (PEA). Organised by the Football Association of Thailand (FA Thailand) and Thai League Co., Ltd., the competition features 16 clubs divided into two groups. Each team plays every other team in its group twice, once at home and once away, and each team in the other group once, either at home or away. The competition is primarily for Thai players under the age of 21, with each club permitted to field up to three over-age Thai players and one foreign player, while at least seven eligible Thai U21 players must be on the field. After the league stage, teams finishing in the same position in each group play each other in a single match to determine the final standings, with the first-placed teams contesting the championship. The season runs from 15 September 2026 to TBD.

== Format ==
The competition consists of two stages: the league stage and the ranking matches.

=== League stage ===
The 16 participating clubs are divided into two groups of eight. Each club plays every other club in its group twice, once at home and once away. Each club also plays every club in the other group once, either at home or away, giving each club a total of 22 matches during the league stage.

Three points are awarded for a win. If a match is drawn after 90 minutes, the winner is determined by a penalty shoot-out. The team winning the penalty shoot-out receives two points, while the losing team receives one point. Goals scored during the penalty shoot-out are not counted in the league standings.

At the end of the league stage, the clubs in each group are ranked according to their accumulated points. In the event of a tie on points, the ranking criteria are applied in the following order:

1. Overall goal difference
2. Overall goals scored
3. Points in head-to-head matches, or mini-league points when more than two clubs are tied
4. Goal difference in head-to-head matches, or mini-league
5. Goals scored in head-to-head matches, or mini-league
6. Fair play points based on accumulated yellow and red cards

Once a criterion separates the tied clubs, subsequent criteria are not considered.

=== Ranking matches ===
After the league stage, clubs finishing in the same position in the two groups are paired against each other in a single ranking match. The first-placed clubs play for the championship, with the winner crowned league champion and the loser finishing second.

From third place onwards, the remaining pairs play to determine the final standings. The winner of each match is placed higher than the loser, with the matches continuing consecutively through the rankings until all participating clubs have been placed.

For the ranking matches, the higher-ranked club is designated as the home team based on its total points from the league stage. If a match is drawn after 90 minutes, the winner is determined by a penalty shoot-out, with no extra time.

== Teams ==
A total of 16 clubs compete in the 2026–27 season, divided into two groups of eight for the league stage.

=== Number of teams by province ===
Position	Province	Number	Teams
1	Bangkok	3	Kasem Bundit University U21s, Kasetsart U21s, and Port U21s
1	Pathum Thani	3	Bangkok United U21s, BG Pathum United U21s, and Chainat Hornbill U21s
3	Chonburi	2	Chonburi U21s and Pattaya United U21s
4	Buriram	1	Buriram United U21s
4	Kanchanaburi	1	Kanchanaburi Power U21s
4	Khon Kaen	1	Khon Kaen United U21s
4	Nong Bua Lamphu	1	Nongbua Pitchaya U21s
4	Prachuap Khiri Khan	1	PT Prachuap U21s
4	Rayong	1	Rayong U21s
4	Sisaket	1	Rasisalai United U21s
4	Suphanburi	1	Suphanburi U21s

=== Stadiums and locations ===
Locations of the 2026–27 Thai U21 League teams

Grp	Team	Parent Club League	Location	Stadium	Coordinates
A	BG Pathum United U21s	Thai League 1	Pathum Thani (Thanyaburi)	BG Training Centre 3	14°00′28″N 100°40′41″E
A	Buriram United U21s	Thai League 1	Buriram (Mueang)	Buriram City Stadium	14°56′45″N 103°06′12″E
A	Kanchanaburi Power U21s	Thai League 2	Kanchanaburi (Tha Muang)	Khao Noi SAO Stadium	13°57′48″N 99°35′35″E
A	Kasem Bundit University U21s	Thai League 3	Bangkok (Min Buri)	Stadium of Kasem Bundit University	13°48′06″N 100°44′06″E
A	Kasetsart U21s	Thai League 2	Bangkok (Chatuchak)	Insee Chantarasatit Stadium	13°50′50″N 100°33′57″E
A	PT Prachuap U21s	Thai League 1	Prachuap Khiri Khan (Mueang)	Sam Ao Stadium	11°49′03″N 99°47′19″E
A	Rasisalai United U21s	Thai League 1	Sisaket (Rasi Salai)	Rasisalai United Training Ground	15°18′04″N 104°08′36″E
A	Suphanburi U21s	Thai League 3	Suphanburi (Sam Chuk)	Stadium of Rajamangala University of Technology Suvarnabhumi, Suphanburi Campus	14°43′06″N 100°06′33″E
B	Bangkok United U21s	Thai League 1	Pathum Thani (Thanyaburi)	BG Training Centre 3	14°00′28″N 100°40′41″E
B	Chainat Hornbill U21s	Thai League 2	Pathum Thani (Khlong Luang)	Thammasat Stadium	14°04′05″N 100°35′56″E
B	Chonburi U21s	Thai League 1	Chonburi (Ban Bueng)	Chang Football Park	13°18′09″N 101°12′25″E
B	Khon Kaen United U21s	Thai League 2	Khon Kaen (Mueang)	Khon Kaen United Training Ground	16°30′50″N 102°50′12″E
B	Nongbua Pitchaya U21s	Thai League 2	Nongbua Lamphu (Mueang)	Pitchaya Stadium	17°11′52″N 102°26′00″E
B	Pattaya United U21s	Thai League 2	Chonburi (Bang Lamung)	Nong Prue Stadium	12°55′28″N 100°56′14″E
B	Port U21s	Thai League 1	Bangkok (Min Buri)	Stadium of Kasem Bundit University	13°48′06″N 100°44′06″E
B	Rayong U21s	Thai League 1	Rayong (Mueang)	Rayong Provincial Stadium	12°40′49″N 101°14′08″E

Locations of teams in Bangkok Metropolitan region

== League stage ==
=== Standings ===
==== Group A ====
Pos	Team	Pld	W	PW	PL	L	GF	GA	GD	Pts	Qualification
1	Buriram United U21s	7	7	0	0	0	37	3	+34	21	Advance to final
2	BG Pathum United U21s	8	5	0	1	2	17	6	+11	16	Advance to 3rd-place play-off
3	Kasem Bundit University U21s	7	5	0	1	1	14	5	+9	16	Advance to 5th-place play-off
4	Kanchanaburi Power U21s	7	3	1	1	2	7	7	0	12	Advance to 7th-place play-off
5	PT Prachuap U21s	7	3	1	1	2	10	11	−1	12	Advance to 9th-place play-off
6	Kasetsart U21s	7	2	2	1	2	9	10	−1	11	Advance to 11th-place play-off
7	Suphanburi U21s	8	2	0	1	5	7	14	−7	7	Advance to 13th-place play-off
8	Rasisalai United U21s	7	1	0	1	5	7	29	−22	4	Advance to 15th-place play-off

Updated to match(es) played on 19 November 2026. Source: Thai League
Rules for classification: 1) Points; 2) Overall goal difference; 3) Overall goals scored; 4) Head-to-head points; 5) Head-to-head goal difference; 6) Head-to-head goals scored; 7) Fair play points.

==== Group B ====
Pos	Team	Pld	W	PW	PL	L	GF	GA	GD	Pts	Qualification
1	Bangkok United U21s	8	5	1	0	2	21	14	+7	17	Advance to final
2	Port U21s	8	4	0	1	3	14	16	−2	13	Advance to 3rd-place play-off
3	Khon Kaen United U21s	8	3	1	0	4	11	11	0	11	Advance to 5th-place play-off
4	Chonburi U21s	7	3	1	0	3	7	10	−3	11	Advance to 7th-place play-off
5	Rayong U21s	8	1	3	1	3	8	12	−4	10	Advance to 9th-place play-off
6	Nongbua Pitchaya U21s	8	2	1	1	4	14	10	+4	9	Advance to 11th-place play-off
7	Chainat Hornbill U21s	8	1	2	1	4	12	16	−4	8	Advance to 13th-place play-off
8	Pattaya United U21s	7	0	0	2	5	4	25	−21	2	Advance to 15th-place play-off

Updated to match(es) played on 19 November 2026. Source: Thai League
Rules for classification: 1) Points; 2) Overall goal difference; 3) Overall goals scored; 4) Head-to-head points; 5) Head-to-head goal difference; 6) Head-to-head goals scored; 7) Fair play points.

=== Positions by round ===
==== Group A ====
Team ╲ Round	1	2	3	4	5	6	7	8	9	10	11	12	13	14	15	16	17	18	19	20	21	22
Buriram United U21s	3	1	1	1	1	1	1	1														
BG Pathum United U21s	1	2	3	4	4	4	2	2														
Kasem Bundit University U21s	2	4	4	2	2	2	3	3														
Kanchanaburi Power U21s	7	5	5	6	5	5	5	4														
PT Prachuap U21s	5	6	6	5	6	7	6	5														
Kasetsart U21s	4	3	2	3	3	3	4	6														
Suphanburi U21s	6	7	8	7	7	6	7	7														
Rasisalai United U21s	8	8	7	8	8	8	8	8														

Source: Thai League
= Leader and advance to final

==== Group B ====
Team ╲ Round	1	2	3	4	5	6	7	8	9	10	11	12	13	14	15	16	17	18	19	20	21	22
Bangkok United U21s	3	3	4	1	2	1	1	1														
Port U21s	8	6	2	4	6	4	5	2														
Khon Kaen United U21s	4	7	7	7	3	5	2	3														
Chonburi U21s	6	5	6	5	1	3	3	4														
Rayong U21s	5	4	5	3	4	6	4	5														
Nongbua Pitchaya U21s	1	2	1	2	5	2	6	6														
Chainat Hornbill U21s	2	1	3	6	7	7	7	7														
Pattaya United U21s	7	8	8	8	8	8	8	8														

Source: Thai League
= Leader and advance to final

=== Results by round ===
==== Group A ====
Team ╲ Round	1	2	3	4	5	6	7	8	9	10	11	12	13	14	15	16	17	18	19	20	21	22
Buriram United U21s	W	W	W	W	W	W	W															
BG Pathum United U21s	W	W	PL	L	W	L	W	W														
Kasem Bundit University U21s	W	PL	W	W	W	L	W															
Kanchanaburi Power U21s	L	W	L	PW	W	W	PL															
PT Prachuap U21s	L	L	W	PW	PL	W	W															
Kasetsart U21s	W	PW	W	PL	PW	L	L															
Suphanburi U21s	L	L	PL	L	W	W	L	L														
Rasisalai United U21s	L	L	PL	L	L	L	W															

Source: Thai League
W = Won; L = Lost; PL = Lost after penalty shoot-out; PW = Won after penalty shoot-out

==== Group B ====
Team ╲ Round	1	2	3	4	5	6	7	8	9	10	11	12	13	14	15	16	17	18	19	20	21	22
Bangkok United U21s	W	L	PW	W	L	W	W	W														
Port U21s	L	W	W	L	L	W	PL	W														
Khon Kaen United U21s	PW	L	L	W	W	L	W	L														
Chonburi U21s	L	W	L	W	W	PW	L															
Rayong U21s	PL	PW	W	PW	L	L	PW	L														
Nongbua Pitchaya U21s	W	PL	PW	L	L	W	L	L														
Chainat Hornbill U21s	W	PW	L	L	L	L	PL	PW														
Pattaya United U21s	L	PL	L	L	PL	L	L															

Source: Thai League
W = Won; L = Lost; PL = Lost after penalty shoot-out; PW = Won after penalty shoot-out

=== Results ===
The league-stage results are shown in a combined table for all 16 clubs, covering both intra-group and inter-group matches. (A) and (B) indicate the groups to which the clubs belong.

Home \ Away	BPU (A)	BRU (A)	KCP (A)	KBU (A)	KST (A)	PPC (A)	RSL (A)	SPB (A)	BKU (B)	CNH (B)	CBR (B)	KKU (B)	NBP (B)	PAT (B)	POR (B)	RYG (B)
BG Pathum United U21s (A)	—		3–0	0–1		2–0							2–2 (1–4 p)			2–0
Buriram United U21s (A)		—					10–1	4–1					1–0	10–0		
Kanchanaburi Power U21s (A)			—		0–0 (3–2 p)		3–0			1–1 (5–6 p)					0–3	
Kasem Bundit University U21s (A)				—		1–2	3–0				2–0	3–0				
Kasetsart U21s (A)		0–2		1–1 (4–2 p)	—							4–1			1–5	
PT Prachuap U21s (A)		1–3				—		1–1 (4–3 p)		2–1	2–1					
Rasisalai United U21s (A)	1–3						—		2–2 (8–9 p)					3–2		
Suphanburi U21s (A)	2–1		0–2		1–3			—	1–2							1–0
Bangkok United U21s (B)				2–3					—			3–2	2–1			
Chainat Hornbill U21s (B)	0–4									—				5–0	0–3	3–4
Chonburi U21s (B)								1–0	1–4	1–1 (3–2 p)	—					
Khon Kaen United U21s (B)							6–0				0–1	—		1–0		
Nongbua Pitchaya U21s (B)			0–1							1–1 (3–4 p)	1–2		—		6–0	
Pattaya United U21s (B)					0–0 (3–5 p)				1–5					—		1–1 (2–4 p)
Port U21s (B)		0–7							3–1			0–1			—	
Rayong U21s (B)						2–2 (4–3 p)						0–0 (3–4 p)	1–3		0–0 (4–3 p)	—

Updated to match(es) played on 19 November 2026. Source: Thai League
Legend: Blue = home team win; Yellow = draw; Red = away team win.
For upcoming matches, an "a" indicates there is an article about the rivalry between the two participants.

== Ranking matches ==
=== Summary ===
Home team	Score	Away team
Final
	–	
3rd-place play-off
	–	
5th-place play-off
	–	
7th-place play-off
	–	
9th-place play-off
	–	
11th-place play-off
	–	
13th-place play-off
	–	
15th-place play-off
	–	
