= 2025 Thai U21 League =

Thai U21 League
- Season: 2025
- Dates: 23 September 2025 – 24 December 2025
- Champions: Bangkok United U21s
- Matches: 72
- Goals: 214 (2.97 per match)
- Top goalscorer: Suradet Chanthapet (12 goals; Nongbua Pitchaya U21s)
- Best goalkeeper: Kittipong Bunmak (8 clean sheets; Buriram United U21s)
- Biggest home win: 6 goals difference Bangkok United U21s 6–0 Pattaya United U21s (2 October 2025)
- Biggest away win: 7 goals difference Ratchaburi U21s 0–7 Nongbua Pitchaya U21s (21 October 2025)
- Highest scoring: 7 goals Nakhon Ratchasima Mazda U21s 5–2 Ratchaburi U21s (7 October 2025); Ratchaburi U21s 0–7 Nongbua Pitchaya U21s (21 October 2025)
- Longest winning run: 11 matches Buriram United U21s
- Longest unbeaten run: 14 matches Buriram United U21s
- Longest winless run: 11 matches Ratchaburi U21s
- Longest losing run: 5 matches Suphanburi U21s; Uthai Thani U21s

The 2025 Thai U21 League was the 2nd season of the Youngster League and the first to be played under the under-21 format, officially known for sponsorship reasons as the PEA U21 Youngster League, named after the Provincial Electricity Authority (PEA). Organised by the Football Association of Thailand (FA Thailand) and Thai League Co., Ltd., the competition was for Thai players under the age of 21 and featured 12 clubs. Each team played every other team once, either at home or away, with the top four advancing to the knockout stage, consisting of semi-finals and finals. The season ran from 23 September to 24 December 2025.

== Format ==
The competition is divided into two stages:

- League stage: Twelve teams compete in a single round-robin format, with each team playing the others once. The top four teams advance to the knockout stage.
- Knockout stage: Consists of semi-finals and a final. Both rounds are played as home-and-away two-legged ties, with the winners on aggregate advancing to the next round and the final determining the champions.

== Teams ==
The 2025 Thai U21 League features twelve teams representing various provinces across Thailand. The majority of these teams are concentrated in the Central, Eastern, Western, and Northeastern regions, highlighting the strong football development in these areas. This regional distribution underscores the league's commitment to nurturing football talent nationwide.

=== Number of teams by province ===
Locations of the 2025 Thai U21 League teams
Locations of teams in Bangkok Metropolitan region

Position	Province	Number	Teams
1	Bangkok	3	Kasetsart U21s, Port U21s, and Uthai Thani U21s
2	Chonburi	2	Chonburi U21s and Pattaya United U21s
3	Buriram	1	Buriram United U21s
3	Kanchanaburi	1	Kanchanaburi Power U21s
3	Nakhon Ratchasima	1	Nakhon Ratchasima Mazda U21s
3	Nong Bua Lamphu	1	Nongbua Pitchaya U21s
3	Pathum Thani	1	Ratchaburi U21s
3	Phra Nakhon Si Ayutthaya	1	Bangkok United U21s
3	Suphanburi	1	Suphanburi U21s

=== Stadiums and locations ===
Team	Parent Club League	Location	Stadium	Coordinates
Bangkok United U21s	Thai League 1	Ayutthaya (Bang Sai)	Ratchakram Stadium	14°10′09″N 100°31′45″E
Buriram United U21s	Thai League 1	Buriram (Mueang)	Buriram City Stadium	14°56′45″N 103°06′12″E
Chonburi U21s	Thai League 1	Chonburi (Chonburi)	Chonburi Daikin Stadium	13°20′11″N 100°57′23″E
Kanchanaburi Power U21s	Thai League 1	Kanchanaburi (Tha Muang)	Khao Noi SAO. Stadium	13°57′48″N 99°35′35″E
Kasetsart U21s	Thai League 2	Bangkok (Chatuchak)	Insee Chantarasatit Stadium	13°50′50″N 100°33′57″E
Nakhon Ratchasima Mazda U21s	Thai League 1	Nakhon Ratchasima (Mueang)	His Majesty the King's 80th Birthday Anniversary Stadium	14°55′38″N 102°02′58″E
Nongbua Pitchaya U21s	Thai League 2	Nongbua Lamphu (Mueang)	Pitchaya Stadium	17°11′52″N 102°26′00″E
Pattaya United U21s	Thai League 2	Chonburi (Bang Lamung)	Nong Prue Stadium	12°55′28″N 100°56′14″E
Port U21s	Thai League 1	Bangkok (Khlong Toei)	PAT Stadium	13°42′55″N 100°33′35″E
Ratchaburi U21s	Thai League 1	Pathum Thani (Lam Luk Ka)	Dhupatemiya Stadium	13°57′04″N 100°37′30″E
Suphanburi U21s	Thai League 3	Suphanburi (Sam Chuk)	Stadium of Rajamangala University of Technology Suvarnabhumi, Suphanburi Campus	14°43′06″N 100°06′33″E
Uthai Thani U21s	Thai League 1	Bangkok (Bang Kapi)	Stadium of Ramkhamhaeng University	13°45′16″N 100°37′00″E

== League stage ==
=== Standings ===
Pos	Team	Pld	W	D	L	GF	GA	GD	Pts	Qualification
1	Buriram United U21s (Q)	11	11	0	0	31	3	+28	33	Advance to knockout stage
2	Bangkok United U21s (Q)	11	8	1	2	28	10	+18	25	Advance to knockout stage
3	Kasetsart U21s (Q)	11	6	2	3	14	10	+4	20 (Note: Kasetsart U21s ahead on head-to-head points record; Kasetsart U21s 3 pts, Nongbua Pitchaya U21s 0 pts.)	Advance to knockout stage
4	Nongbua Pitchaya U21s (Q)	11	6	2	3	30	11	+19	20	Advance to knockout stage
5	Port U21s	11	5	3	3	18	12	+6	18	
6	Nakhon Ratchasima Mazda U21s	11	5	2	4	17	17	0	17	
7	Chonburi U21s	11	4	3	4	16	17	−1	15	
8	Kanchanaburi Power U21s	11	3	4	4	10	16	−6	13	
9	Uthai Thani U21s	11	2	3	6	5	16	−11	9	
10	Pattaya United U21s	11	2	2	7	14	30	−16	8	
11	Suphanburi U21s	11	1	1	9	11	26	−15	4	
12	Ratchaburi U21s	11	0	3	8	8	34	−26	3	

Source: Thai League
Rules for classification: 1) Points; 2) Head-to-head points; 3) Head-to-head goal difference; 4) Head-to-head goal scored; 5) Overall goal difference; 6) Overall goal scored; 7) Fair play points; 8) Play-off without extra time).
(Q) Qualified for the phase indicated

=== Positions by round ===
Team ╲ Round	1	2	3	4	5	6	7	8	9	10	11
Buriram United U21s	8	10	9	5	3	3	2	2	2	2	1
Bangkok United U21s	1	1	1	1	1	1	1	1	1	1	2
Kasetsart U21s	3	3	2	3	5	4	4	5	3	4	3
Nongbua Pitchaya U21s	12	8	4	8	8	6	6	7	5	3	4
Port U21s	2	4	3	2	2	2	3	3	6	6	5
Nakhon Ratchasima Mazda U21s	10	7	5	6	4	7	7	6	4	5	6
Chonburi U21s	4	2	6	4	6	5	5	4	7	7	7
Kanchanaburi Power U21s	5	6	10	7	7	8	8	8	8	8	8
Uthai Thani U21s	7	5	7	10	9	9	9	9	9	9	9
Pattaya United U21s	6	9	8	9	10	10	10	10	10	10	10
Suphanburi U21s	11	12	11	12	11	11	11	11	12	12	11
Ratchaburi U21s	9	11	12	11	12	12	12	12	11	11	12

Source: Thai League
= Leader and advance to knockout stage; = Advance to knockout stage

=== Results by round ===
Team ╲ Round	1	2	3	4	5	6	7	8	9	10	11
Buriram United U21s	W	W	W	W	W	W	W	W	W	W	W
Bangkok United U21s	W	W	D	W	W	W	W	L	W	W	L
Kasetsart U21s	W	D	W	L	W	D	W	L	W	L	W
Nongbua Pitchaya U21s	L	D	W	L	L	W	W	D	W	W	W
Port U21s	W	D	D	W	W	W	L	L	L	D	W
Nakhon Ratchasima Mazda U21s	L	D	W	L	W	L	W	W	W	L	D
Chonburi U21s	D	W	L	W	W	L	W	D	L	D	L
Kanchanaburi Power U21s	D	L	W	D	L	W	W	D	D	L	L
Uthai Thani U21s	D	W	L	L	L	L	L	W	L	D	D
Pattaya United U21s	D	L	W	L	L	L	L	W	L	D	L
Suphanburi U21s	L	L	L	L	D	L	L	L	L	L	W
Ratchaburi U21s	L	L	L	L	D	L	L	D	D	L	L

Source: Thai League
W = Won; D = Drawn; L = Lost

=== Results ===
Home \ Away	BKU	BRU	CBR	KCP	KST	NRM	NBP	PAT	POR	RBI	SPB	UTT
Bangkok United U21s	—	0–1	3–1	—	—	—	5–1	6–0	—	3–1	—	1–0
Buriram United U21s	—	—	—	—	2–0	3–0	—	—	1–0	5–0	4–2	—
Chonburi U21s	—	0–5	—	2–2	—	—	0–0	—	1–1	—	—	3–0
Kanchanaburi Power U21s	2–1	0–1	—	—	—	1–0	1–5	—	1–4	0–0	—	—
Kasetsart U21s	1–2	—	1–0	1–0	—	1–1	—	—	—	—	3–0	0–1
Nakhon Ratchasima Mazda U21s	1–2	—	2–1	—	—	—	0–3	1–0	—	5–2	—	—
Nongbua Pitchaya U21s	—	1–2	—	—	0–1	—	—	5–0	—	—	3–1	5–1
Pattaya United U21s	—	0–5	2–3	2–2	2–3	—	—	—	—	—	—	0–0
Port U21s	1–1	—	—	—	1–2	2–3	0–0	3–2	—	2–0	—	—
Ratchaburi U21s	—	—	1–3	—	1–1	—	0–7	1–3	—	—	1–4	1–1
Suphanburi U21s	1–4	—	0–2	0–0	—	1–3	—	1–3	1–2	—	—	—
Uthai Thani U21s	—	0–2	—	0–1	—	1–1	—	—	0–2	—	1–0	—

Source: Thai League
Legend: Blue = home team win; Yellow = draw; Red = away team win.
For upcoming matches, an "a" indicates there is an article about the rivalry between the two participants.

== Knockout stage ==
Semi-finals
3	Kasetsart U21s	1	0	1
2	Bangkok United U21s	1	1	2
4	Nongbua Pitchaya U21s	2	1	3
1	Buriram United U21s	2	3	5

Finals
Bangkok United U21s	0	1	1
Buriram United U21s	0	0	0

=== Semi-finals ===
2 December 2025
17:00 UTC+7
Semi-finals 1st leg

Kasetsart U21s	1–1	Bangkok United U21s
Settawut Pongjitsupap 90'	Report; Highlight	Chonlachart Tongjinda 47'

Insee Chantarasatit Stadium,
Chatuchak, Bangkok
Attendance: 250
Referee: Kittichai Huthip (Thailand)
10 December 2025
15:30 UTC+7
Semi-finals 2nd leg

Bangkok United U21s	1–0	Kasetsart U21s
Siravich Chaiworamukkul 58'	Report; Highlight

Ratchakram Stadium,
Bang Sai, Phra Nakhon Si Ayutthaya
Attendance: 100
Referee: Chaiya Moolmanee (Thailand)

Bangkok United U21s won 2–1 on aggregate.

2 December 2025
17:00 UTC+7
Semi-finals 1st leg

Nongbua Pitchaya U21s	2–2	Buriram United U21s
Peeranan Baukhai 12'; Pakawat Taengoakson 38' (o.g.)	Report; Highlight	Paripan Wongsa 60'; Chanothai Kongmeng 90'

Pitchaya Stadium,
Mueang, Nong Bua Lamphu
Attendance: 1,300
Referee: Jarin Yawapee (Thailand)
9 December 2025
17:00 UTC+7
Semi-finals 2nd leg

Buriram United U21s	3–1	Nongbua Pitchaya U21s
Pakawat Taengoakson 64'; Paripan Wongsa 75'; Phanuwit Jeyakom 90+3'	Report; Highlight	Suradet Chanthapet 58'

Buriram City Stadium,
Mueang, Buriram
Attendance: 198
Referee: Manuschai Chawong (Thailand)

Buriram United U21s won 5–3 on aggregate.

=== Finals ===
==== 1st leg ====
17 December 2025
15:30 UTC+7
Finals 1st leg

Bangkok United U21s	0–0	Buriram United U21s
	Report; Highlight

Ratchakram Stadium,
Bang Sai, Phra Nakhon Si Ayutthaya
Referee: Kitisak Pikunngoen (Thailand)

Bangkok United U21s	Buriram United U21s

Lineups:
GK	12	Chanasorn Kaewyos
RB	22	Nontapat Ploymee		(substituted off) 28'
CB	4	Phurich Subhensawang	(red card) 65'
CB	3	Siravich Chaiworamukkul
LB	23	Surachai Booncharee	(yellow card) 55'
RM	11	Achita Nawathit		(substituted off) 28'
DM	20	Nutthakit Enanorit
DM	8	Sirayos Dansakul (c)
LM	17	Chonlachart Tongjinda		(substituted off) 72'
CF	10	Nopparat Promiem
CF	9	Thanawat Deelert		(substituted off) 66'
Substitutes:
GK	25	Naphol Wongboon
DF	5	Setthaphong Sathorn
DF	6	Kongpop Sodsong	(yellow card) 90+2'	(substituted on) 28'
DF	14	Supakan Binsaha
DF	15	Warakorn Huatwiset		(substituted on) 66'
DF	19	Mirako Inaram		(substituted on) 72'
MF	7	Krit Klangpan	(yellow card) 75'		(substituted on) 72'
MF	16	Pichaya Kongsri
MF	18	Aekkarat Sansuwan		(substituted on) 28'	(substituted off) 72'
Head Coach:
(Thailand) Jirawat Lainananukul

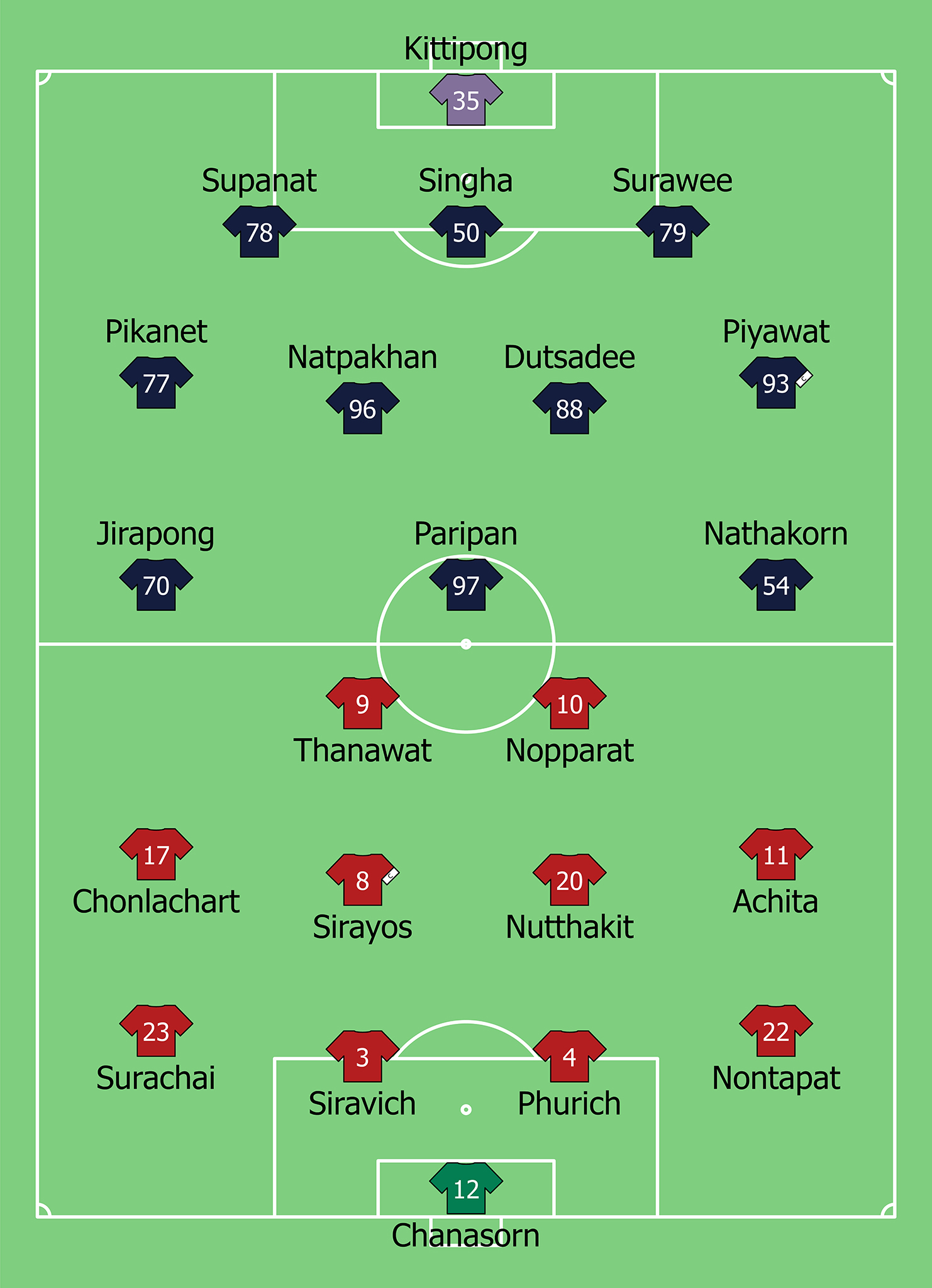

Lineups:
GK	35	Kittipong Bunmak
CB	78	Supanat Mahawai
CB	50	Singha Marasa
CB	79	Surawee Rodma
RM	77	Pikanet Laohawiwat	(yellow card) 86'
CM	96	Natpakhan Promthongmee	(yellow card) 52'	(substituted off) 60'
CM	88	Dutsadee Buranajutanon		(substituted off) 88'
LM	93	Piyawat Petra (c)
RF	70	Jirapong Pungviravong		(substituted off) 60'
CF	97	Paripan Wongsa	(yellow card) 39' (yellow-red card) 82'
LF	54	Nathakorn Rattanasuwan
Substitutes:
GK	98	Anut Samran
MF	39	Chanothai Kongmeng		(substituted on) 60'
MF	47	Sakdisek Kosol		(substituted on) 60'
MF	49	Phanuwit Jeyakom		(substituted on) 88'
MF	55	Thanyakon Swangsuk
MF	65	Phonphithak Rungrueang
FW	81	Ratchanon Khodchasenee
FW	84	Sorakrit Kaewsri
FW	94	Phanuphong Jeyakom
Head Coach:
(Thailand) Arnon Kaewphruek

==== 2nd leg ====
24 December 2025
17:00 UTC+7
Finals 2nd leg

Buriram United U21s	0–1	Bangkok United U21s
	Report; Highlight	Warakorn Huatwiset 53'

Buriram City Stadium,
Mueang, Buriram
Referee: Alongkorn Khonwai (Thailand)

Buriram United U21s	Bangkok United U21s

Lineups:
GK	35	Kittipong Bunmak
CB	42	Pakawat Taengoakson
CB	50	Singha Marasa
CB	78	Supanat Mahawai
RM	77	Pikanet Laohawiwat	(yellow card) 59'	(substituted off) 90+7'
CM	96	Natpakhan Promthongmee
CM	88	Dutsadee Buranajutanon		(substituted off) 84'
LM	93	Piyawat Petra (c)	(yellow card) 42'
RF	97	Paripan Wongsa
CF	39	Chanothai Kongmeng		(substituted off) 62'
LF	54	Nathakorn Rattanasuwan
Substitutes:
GK	98	Anut Samran
DF	60	Jirapol Saelio
DF	79	Surawee Rodma
MF	47	Sakdisek Kosol
MF	49	Phanuwit Jeyakom		(substituted on) 84'
MF	55	Thanyakon Swangsuk		(substituted on) 90+7'
MF	70	Jirapong Pungviravong		(substituted on) 62'
FW	81	Ratchanon Khodchasenee
FW	94	Phanuphong Jeyakom
Head Coach:
(Thailand) Arnon Kaewphruek

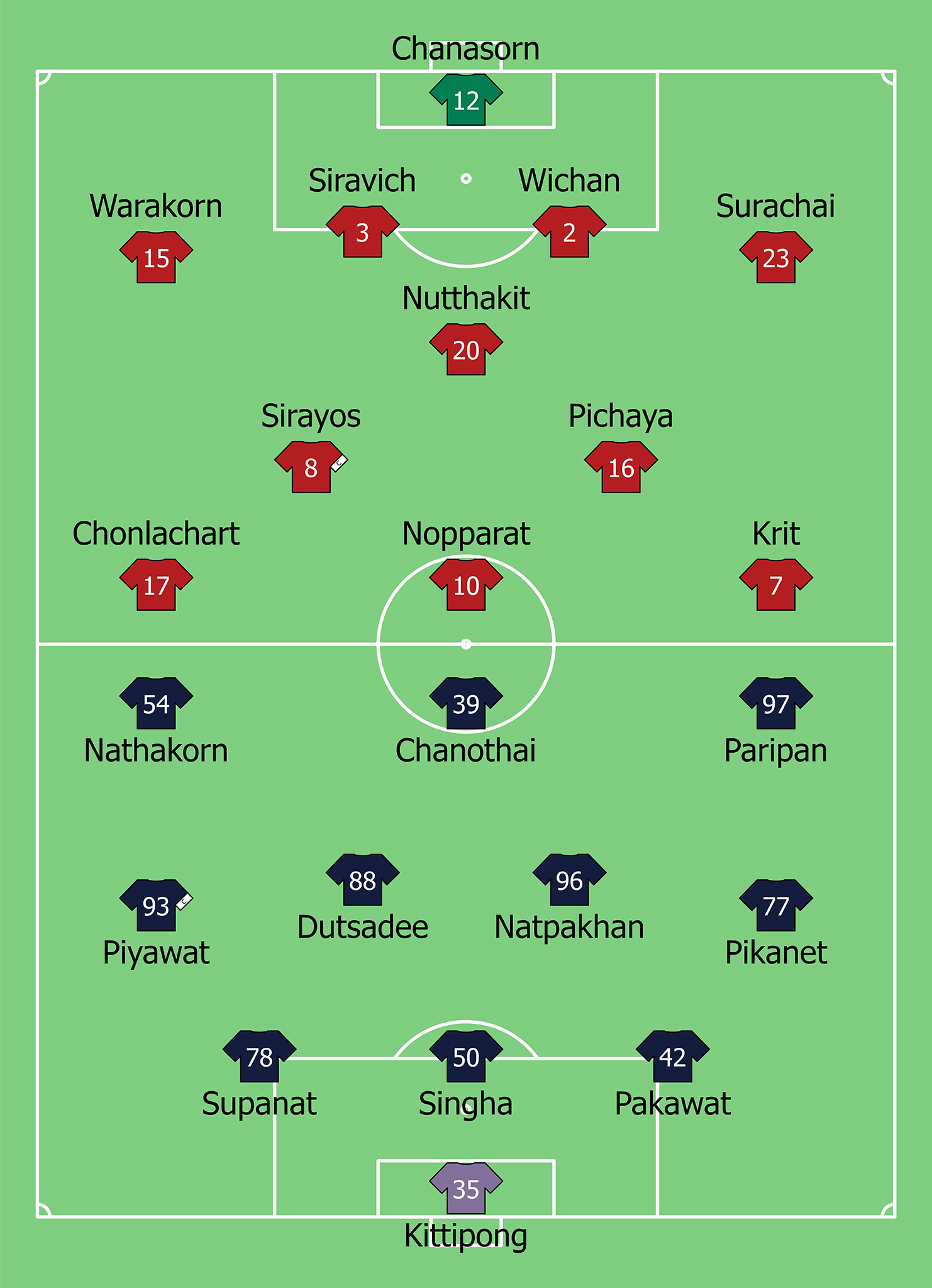

Lineups:
GK	12	Chanasorn Kaewyos		(yellow card) 90+5'
RB	15	Warakorn Huatwiset	53'	(yellow card) 47'	(substituted off) 58'
CB	3	Siravich Chaiworamukkul		(yellow card) 90+8'
CB	2	Wichan Inaram
LB	23	Surachai Booncharee
DM	20	Nutthakit Enanorit			(substituted off) 85'
CM	8	Sirayos Dansakul (c)
CM	16	Pichaya Kongsri			(substituted off) 68'
RF	17	Chonlachart Tongjinda			(substituted off) 85'
CF	10	Nopparat Promiem
LF	7	Krit Klangpan			(substituted off) 58'
Substitutes:
GK	25	Naphol Wongboon
DF	5	Setthaphong Sathorn
DF	14	Supakan Binsaha			(substituted on) 85'
DF	19	Mirako Inaram			(substituted on) 58'
DF	22	Nontapat Ploymee			(substituted on) 58'
MF	13	Pachara Wangsawat
MF	18	Aekkarat Sansuwan			(substituted on) 68'
FW	9	Thanawat Deelert			(substituted on) 85'
FW	11	Achita Nawathit
Head Coach:
(Thailand) Jirawat Lainananukul

Bangkok United U21s won 1–0 on aggregate.

== Season statistics ==
=== Top scorers ===
As of 24 December 2025.

Rank	Player	Club	Goals
1	Suradet Chanthapet	Nongbua Pitchaya U21s	12
2	Nopparat Promiem	Bangkok United U21s	10
3	Tanapat Hongkhiao	Port U21s	8
4	Chonlachart Tongjinda	Bangkok United U21s	7
4	Prasatporn Hongwilai	Nongbua Pitchaya U21s	7

=== Hat-tricks ===
Player	For	Against	Result	Date
Nopparat Promiem^{4}	Bangkok United U21s	Nongbua Pitchaya U21s	5–1 (H)	11 October 2025
Prasatporn Hongwilai^{4}	Nongbua Pitchaya U21s	Ratchaburi U21s	7–0 (A)	21 October 2025
Suradet Chanthapet	Nongbua Pitchaya U21s	Pattaya United U21s	5–0 (H)	11 November 2025
Apiwit Tangtrakulsap	Nakhon Ratchasima Mazda U21s	Port U21s	3–2 (A)	12 November 2025

Notes: ^{4} = Player scored 4 goals; (H) = Home team; (A) = Away team

=== Clean sheets ===
As of 24 December 2025.

Rank	Player	Club	Clean sheets
1	Kittipong Bunmak	Buriram United U21s	8
2	Chanasorn Kaewyos	Bangkok United U21s	4
2	Vorameth Yodsanit	Kasetsart U21s	4
2	Thanasak Kittitarakul	Nongbua Pitchaya U21s	4
5	Apiwich Deesomjoranee	Port U21s	3

== Team Squad statistics ==
=== Bangkok United U21s ===
No.	Pos.	Name	Date of Birth	Age	League		Discipline	
No.	Pos.	Name	Date of Birth	Age	Apps	Goals	Yellow card	Red card
1	GK	Supanut Sudathip	22 June 2006	19	2	0	0	0
2	DF	Wichan Inaram	10 July 2007	18	1	0	0	0
3	DF	Siravich Chaiworamukkul	25 November 2004	21	9(2)	2	1	0
4	DF	Phurich Subhensawang	1 February 2007	18	12	1	0	1
5	DF	Setthaphong Sathorn	18 January 2007	18	5(5)	0	0	0
6	DF	Kongpop Sodsong	24 March 2006	19	12(2)	0	4	0
7	MF	Krit Klangpan	13 February 2006	19	3(5)	1	1	0
8	MF	Sirayos Dansakul	22 January 2004	21	14	0	5	0
9	FW	Thanawat Deelert	1 January 2007	18	5(8)	2	2	0
10	FW	Nopparat Promiem	1 August 2004	21	13	10	0	0
11	FW	Achita Nawathit	9 March 2007	18	8(4)	0	1	0
12	GK	Chanasorn Kaewyos	12 September 2005	20	11	0	2	0
13	MF	Pachara Wangsawat	4 September 2007	18	0(1)	0	1	0
14	DF	Supakan Binsaha	11 January 2006	19	3(5)	0	0	0
15	DF	Warakorn Huatwiset	28 October 2005	20	5(7)	3	2	0
16	MF	Pichaya Kongsri	3 August 2007	18	2(1)	0	0	0
17	MF	Chonlachart Tongjinda	31 March 2005	20	13(1)	7	2	0
18	MF	Aekkarat Sansuwan	8 June 2006	19	6(9)	0	0	0
19	DF	Mirako Inaram	19 July 2006	19	2(2)	1	0	0
20	MF	Nutthakit Enanorit	28 January 2007	18	11(1)	1	1	0
21	MF	Tanakorn Duangpang	21 May 2007	18	3(6)	0	0	0
22	DF	Nontapat Ploymee	6 February 2006	19	12(2)	1	4	0
23	DF	Surachai Booncharee	26 April 2007	18	11(1)	1	2	0
25	GK	Naphol Wongboon	26 April 2004	21	2(1)	0	0	0
Own goals					—	0	N/A	

=== Buriram United U21s ===
No.	Pos.	Name	Date of Birth	Age	League		Discipline	
No.	Pos.	Name	Date of Birth	Age	Apps	Goals	Yellow card	Red card
35	GK	Kittipong Bunmak	22 March 2005	20	12	0	2	0
39	MF	Chanothai Kongmeng	7 March 2006	19	8(6)	5	2	0
42	DF	Pakawat Taengoakson	28 February 2005	20	13	2	3	1
45	GK	Prapot Chongcharoen	4 January 2007	18	1(1)	0	0	0
47	MF	Sakdisek Kosol	23 July 2004	21	5(9)	0	0	0
49	MF	Phanuwit Jeyakom	18 June 2009	16	1(6)	1	1	0
50	DF	Singha Marasa	19 August 2006	19	12(1)	3	1	0
52	DF	Chatchawat Sahanunchaichid	28 March 2009	16	1	0	1	0
54	FW	Nathakorn Rattanasuwan	5 February 2007	18	14	5	2	0
55	MF	Thanyakon Swangsuk	29 May 2007	18	2(9)	0	1	0
60	DF	Jirapol Saelio	12 March 2006	19	7(2)	0	1	0
65	MF	Phonphithak Rungrueang	15 September 2009	16	0(3)	0	0	0
70	MF	Jirapong Pungviravong	20 September 2006	19	10(5)	1	3	0
74	MF	Thanakon Kawikamonchat	7 August 2007	18	4(4)	4	0	0
77	DF	Pikanet Laohawiwat	4 March 2005	20	11(2)	1	6	1
78	DF	Supanat Mahawai	12 April 2007	18	11(4)	0	3	0
79	DF	Surawee Rodma	8 August 2007	18	2(1)	0	0	0
81	FW	Ratchanon Khodchasenee	1 December 2007	18	1(3)	1	0	0
84	FW	Sorakrit Kaewsri	28 February 2008	17	1(2)	0	0	0
88	MF	Dutsadee Buranajutanon	7 March 2006	19	12(1)	3	1	0
93	DF	Piyawat Petra	15 March 2005	20	13	2	3	0
94	FW	Phanuphong Jeyakom	18 June 2009	16	1(2)	0	1	0
96	MF	Natpakhan Promthongmee	28 November 2005	20	11	1	3	0
97	FW	Paripan Wongsa	19 March 2005	20	10(2)	6	2	1
98	GK	Anut Samran	16 April 2006	19	2(2)	0	0	0
Own goals					—	1	N/A	

=== Chonburi U21s ===
No.	Pos.	Name	Date of Birth	Age	League		Discipline	
No.	Pos.	Name	Date of Birth	Age	Apps	Goals	Yellow card	Red card
1	GK	Tissanu Khuptanavin	10 February 2006	19	4	0	1	0
2	DF	Tanaphon Luekrajang	26 June 2008	17	2	0	0	0
3	DF	Ratchanon Phoonpatanasab	16 January 2008	17	11	0	2	0
4	DF	Karin Seekeaw	13 August 2009	16	8(1)	0	1	0
5	DF	Phuttimaet Chardtum	17 April 2009	16	3(3)	0	0	0
6	MF	Wirawat Phonkun	19 January 2008	17	0(1)	0	0	0
7	FW	Roengchai Kesada	27 July 2005	20	10(1)	5	1	0
9	FW	Tontawan Puntamunee	1 May 2006	19	10	4	0	0
10	FW	Siraphop Wandee	22 January 2004	21	6(1)	5	1	0
13	DF	Thanphisit Peanksikum	6 January 2009	16	10(1)	0	1	0
14	DF	Wathanyu Nairatsami	26 January 2008	17	10(1)	0	0	0
15	DF	Tanatat Lapchok	4 January 2008	17	0(3)	0	0	0
16	DF	Teerawee Waewwabsri	5 April 2006	19	0	0	0	0
17	MF	Achirawit Lajomjai	17 May 2009	16	0(5)	0	0	0
18	GK	Thanawat Panthong	6 April 2004	21	7	0	0	0
19	FW	Sila Puttasara	4 January 2008	17	1(8)	0	0	0
20	MF	Punmanat Jaimuang	3 January 2007	18	4(3)	0	0	0
21	MF	Thiwakorn Chiengpuk	17 March 2008	17	1(2)	0	0	0
22	MF	Naphat Chumpanya	26 February 2007	18	11	1	2	0
23	MF	Tanakon Pinkaew	11 August 2008	17	11	1	1	0
24	MF	Weeraphat Sutantangchai	6 February 2010	15	9(1)	0	1	0
25	FW	Jirayu Namrueangsri	20 May 2010	15	2(9)	0	2	0
26	GK	Harid Monsin	11 March 2010	15	0	0	0	0
27	MF	Anawin Kasisit	19 June 2010	15	1(7)	0	0	0
Own goals					—	0	N/A	

=== Kanchanaburi Power U21s ===
No.	Pos.	Name	Date of Birth	Age	League		Discipline	
No.	Pos.	Name	Date of Birth	Age	Apps	Goals	Yellow card	Red card
1	GK	Thanakorn Orachorn	19 January 2004	21	5	0	0	0
2	DF	Tanabodee Seneewong	18 July 2006	19	2(1)	0	0	0
3	DF	Woraphop Phuangpharaka	13 March 2006	19	8(1)	0	0	0
5	DF	Griangkal Hengchinda	13 August 2007	18	4(4)	0	0	0
6	DF	Chonlachart Suepsunthon	9 February 2004	21	9(1)	0	4	0
7	FW	Pithan Ketthong	20 January 2006	19	3(6)	0	0	0
8	MF	Kittiwet Lochit	4 April 2004	21	6	0	3	1
9	FW	Kanatip Vimoonsak	8 February 2008	17	2	0	0	0
10	MF	Prasobchok Sompech	3 October 2004	21	10(1)	1	4	0
11	MF	Weerapat Krongsangwan	22 January 2004	21	6(2)	0	0	0
13	GK	Sarawut Malison	5 November 2004	21	0(1)	0	0	0
14	DF	Thanawat Uaongwun	20 March 2006	19	5(5)	1	2	0
15	FW	Thapakon Duangphlap	26 November 2007	18	10(1)	0	0	0
16	MF	Kiadtisuk Seenunejan	24 January 2005	20	8(1)	0	0	0
17	FW	Witthawat Prasom	21 July 2006	19	1	1	0	0
18	FW	Kittiphod Sathitphanuwat	17 April 2009	16	6(2)	1	2	0
19	FW	Kanok Sangkasopha	27 September 2004	21	9(1)	2	2	0
20	MF	Thiramet Phumiphaksuwan	31 October 2007	18	0(1)	0	0	0
21	MF	Thanakorn Intharasorn	23 January 2006	19	0(7)	0	2	0
23	MF	Danupon Promjanda	5 September 2004	21	5(4)	0	1	0
24	DF	Napat Thongnak	14 December 2005	20	2(5)	0	0	0
27	GK	Nitipat Chuemklang	27 March 2005	20	6	0	0	0
28	DF	Suwat Gosintorn	28 January 2005	20	11	1	5	1
29	FW	Badin Phromma	28 March 2007	18	3(5)	3	2	0
30	GK	Piyawat Subsawan	9 February 2007	18	0	0	0	0
Own goals					—	0	N/A	

=== Kasetsart U21s ===
No.	Pos.	Name	Date of Birth	Age	League		Discipline	
No.	Pos.	Name	Date of Birth	Age	Apps	Goals	Yellow card	Red card
1	GK	Tanakrit Petchkaew	19 February 2008	17	1	0	0	0
3	DF	Nithitep Phomchareon	28 July 2006	19	2(2)	0	0	0
5	DF	Apichon Kraiyawong	3 April 2004	21	10	0	0	0
6	MF	Peeraka Ittichotikorn	13 February 2005	20	11	1	0	0
7	MF	Thantham Thonhtumlung	1 January 2007	18	7(4)	0	4	0
8	FW	Chypeerah Punthavanich	13 December 2007	18	12	0	1	0
9	FW	Nattapong Srivichairatana	11 August 2005	20	0(4)	0	0	0
10	FW	Natthakorn Prasartkarnkha	23 April 2008	17	2(10)	4	2	0
11	FW	Pakin Mahangwa	9 November 2007	18	5(8)	0	0	0
12	DF	Khanaphot Saikaew	29 April 2005	20	6(2)	0	0	0
13	DF	Karin Kaewsaikhao	12 March 2008	17	12	0	1	0
14	MF	Thanakorn Sudweha	3 September 2008	17	9(2)	0	0	0
17	MF	Wattanai Jutukoon	21 April 2005	20	11(1)	1	1	0
18	FW	Natchanon Phanset	18 October 2004	21	6(2)	2	0	0
19	FW	Chypirune Punthavanich	13 December 2007	18	6(4)	1	0	0
24	MF	Natchanon Bubphawat	25 January 2008	17	1	0	0	0
25	DF	Patratorn Teslongthong	5 November 2008	17	0(9)	0	1	0
27	FW	Arthitriw Songsayorm	27 January 2006	19	0(2)	1	1	0
37	DF	Pattaraphong Inthachayakom	16 February 2006	19	3(5)	0	2	0
48	MF	Panntat Poomvana	24 January 2005	20	7(2)	0	0	0
66	DF	Chanakorn Kongsoubchat	30 September 2005	20	12	1	1	0
76	GK	Vorameth Yodsanit	8 October 2005	20	12	0	1	0
77	FW	Witchaya Rattana	4 November 2006	19	7(2)	2	0	0
84	GK	Naphon Vachirabanklang	1 January 2007	18	0	0	0	0
88	FW	Settawut Pongjitsupap	16 February 2006	19	1(5)	2	0	0
Own goals					—	0	N/A	

=== Nakhon Ratchasima Mazda U21s ===
No.	Pos.	Name	Date of Birth	Age	League		Discipline	
No.	Pos.	Name	Date of Birth	Age	Apps	Goals	Yellow card	Red card
2	DF	Thanapat Warong	2 March 2004	21	11	0	2	0
3	DF	Rachata Promkan	17 April 2008	17	3	0	0	0
5	MF	Siriwat Sakkhwa	12 January 2008	17	11	0	1	0
6	MF	Wichaya A-reeram	24 March 2007	18	5(4)	1	3	0
7	MF	Kongphop Wichian	1 September 2006	19	7(4)	1	1	0
8	FW	Patipan Duadkrathok	30 March 2004	21	11	5	0	0
10	FW	Pannathat Prempri	17 September 2007	18	11	4	0	0
11	FW	Phalakon Nudaeng	16 September 2004	21	1(6)	0	0	0
13	MF	Settawut Chuaypakwan	1 May 2008	17	1(4)	0	1	0
14	FW	Aueangkool Peangkhokkruad	18 January 2004	21	10	0	7	0
17	MF	Tanatee Simee	8 December 2006	19	3(6)	1	1	0
18	GK	Thatthana Burinram	5 June 2007	18	8	0	1	0
20	DF	Teerapol Phomkajorn	10 July 2007	18	6(2)	0	2	0
22	FW	Apiwit Tangtrakulsap	5 December 2006	19	7(4)	4	2	0
23	GK	Sorawich Ponuansri	19 May 2009	16	0	0	0	0
30	FW	Suprasit Buasuk	5 August 2004	21	2(3)	1	0	0
33	DF	Suphakon Sinnok	11 April 2007	18	1(2)	0	0	0
34	GK	Ashiravit Nutsuntia	18 June 2009	16	1	0	0	0
39	DF	Sakdithat Rotsut	9 March 2007	18	6(1)	0	2	0
47	DF	Narongsak Phetnok	20 July 2004	21	5(1)	0	0	0
55	GK	Sorawis Srifah	5 October 2007	18	2(1)	0	0	0
79	MF	Phankawi Sroisri	12 January 2008	17	0(1)	0	0	0
81	MF	Noppakorn Kanhabang	26 June 2006	19	8(2)	0	2	0
88	MF	Supawit Sangthopo	21 November 2006	19	1(2)	0	0	0
Own goals					—	1	N/A	

=== Nongbua Pitchaya U21s ===
No.	Pos.	Name	Date of Birth	Age	League		Discipline	
No.	Pos.	Name	Date of Birth	Age	Apps	Goals	Yellow card	Red card
3	DF	Chittaworn Muangkhun	16 January 2005	20	2(1)	0	0	0
14	FW	Thanawut Phochai	2 December 2005	20	0(1)	0	0	0
15	MF	Ritthanuphap Jintanakong	18 February 2005	20	5(1)	0	1	0
21	DF	Kittikawin Sudsuk	16 July 2006	19	10(2)	0	1	0
22	MF	Pattaratron Buransuk	24 October 2007	18	1(1)	0	0	0
23	MF	Apirak Udommadan	16 June 2005	20	1(10)	0	0	0
25	MF	Chawanakorn Khonpho	27 November 2006	19	0(1)	0	0	0
26	DF	Kasidit Maipho	26 November 2004	21	11	3	1	0
28	FW	Suradet Chanthapet	8 January 2004	21	12	12	2	0
30	FW	Kantaphat Sonsena	1 August 2008	17	7(5)	2	4	1
31	GK	Supakorn Poonphol	25 September 2008	17	3	0	0	0
32	MF	Nattawat Judasing	28 February 2005	20	12(1)	0	2	0
37	GK	Peeraphat Ditchanthuek	6 June 2007	18	0(1)	0	0	0
39	GK	Thanasak Kittitarakul	31 July 2006	19	10	0	0	0
40	FW	Naratip Kittikananurak	9 December 2008	17	1(4)	0	1	0
42	FW	Satanan Temprom	29 August 2008	17	5(6)	0	1	0
43	MF	Prasatporn Hongwilai	10 August 2005	20	12(1)	7	2	0
44	FW	Thanakrit Jampalee	20 March 2006	19	1(4)	1	0	0
50	DF	Pawornpat Yeeram	21 March 2007	18	8	0	0	1
54	DF	Pattaraburin Jannawan	5 July 2005	20	7(5)	2	1	1
55	DF	Thanaphat Phiwsawang	9 January 2007	18	3(8)	0	2	0
77	MF	Peeranan Baukhai	17 June 2005	20	7(2)	3	2	0
79	DF	Ratchanon Wichangoen	7 May 2007	18	13	0	1	0
93	FW	Rapeepat Prasongsoo	1 May 2006	19	2(6)	1	0	0
98	DF	Satrayu Sikuancha	15 August 2004	21	10(2)	0	3	0
Own goals					—	1	N/A	

=== Pattaya United U21s ===
No.	Pos.	Name	Date of Birth	Age	League		Discipline	
No.	Pos.	Name	Date of Birth	Age	Apps	Goals	Yellow card	Red card
6	MF	Supakit Paruen	15 December 2006	19	5(3)	0	2	0
7	MF	Martin Grobmann	6 March 2008	17	2(6)	3	0	0
8	MF	Anuwat Sripralad	2 October 2007	18	8(2)	0	0	0
9	FW	Pongpak Songprapa	14 February 2005	20	8(3)	0	2	0
10	MF	Aphirak Borikul	25 January 2005	20	1(5)	0	0	0
11	FW	Jedsada Seriphunphat	11 January 2005	20	4(6)	2	0	0
13	MF	Sorayutth Sonkumharn	24 August 2005	20	1(2)	0	0	0
14	DF	Krithawu Sodachan	18 September 2006	19	9	0	0	0
16	DF	Suttupai Oakkhanarat	22 May 2006	19	11	0	1	0
17	MF	Apisit Butsri	25 April 2005	20	8	1	0	0
18	GK	Thanaphat Changsi	4 September 2007	18	7	0	2	0
19	DF	Wirachach Umtum	25 January 2005	20	9(2)	1	3	0
20	DF	Phattharaphol Sapcharoen	1 August 2008	17	2(5)	0	1	0
21	MF	Noppadol Nuylert	29 April 2005	20	6(2)	1	3	0
22	DF	Prakaipet Faphimai	12 May 2005	20	3(6)	0	0	0
24	MF	Supharoek Saengaun	26 May 2006	19	0(1)	0	0	0
26	GK	Narongkorn Saenardtho	26 August 2004	21	2	0	0	0
27	MF	Rattapong Promla	3 June 2006	19	8	5	2	0
29	MF	Jack Creasey	29 May 2008	17	2(1)	0	1	0
37	MF	Kriwit Seubpeng	30 January 2004	21	7(2)	0	0	0
41	DF	Jamie Derek O'Brien	13 December 2006	19	7(3)	0	3	0
49	DF	Eakaphat Jaenooduang	9 April 2006	19	9	0	4	0
55	MF	Navee Pumcharoen	9 January 2005	20	0(3)	1	0	0
79	GK	Suphachai Loedanan	10 August 2007	18	2(1)	0	0	0
88	MF	Patthadon Chatnak	9 July 2008	17	0(2)	0	0	0
Own goals					—	1	N/A	

=== Port U21s ===
No.	Pos.	Name	Date of Birth	Age	League		Discipline	
No.	Pos.	Name	Date of Birth	Age	Apps	Goals	Yellow card	Red card
1	GK	Phawat Chuenmeelit	9 August 2005	20	1	0	0	0
3	DF	Adison Wantea	28 September 2004	21	10	0	1	0
4	DF	Chinphak Nonyaso	1 October 2006	19	9(1)	0	1	1
5	DF	Dhammanoon Chiangkasem	30 August 2007	18	11	0	1	0
6	MF	Pongsakorn Waenkaew	28 September 2008	17	4(4)	0	1	0
7	MF	Anuson Adomsook	1 July 2008	17	10	3	1	0
8	DF	Peerawit Jampatong	1 January 2008	17	1(7)	0	1	0
9	FW	Oluwafemi Anapat Joseph Azeh	26 March 2004	21	4(4)	0	4	0
10	FW	Alif Yamasare	9 May 2006	19	1(10)	4	0	0
11	MF	Thanakit Duangtawan	30 October 2006	19	5(4)	1	2	0
12	MF	Weerat Tuhian	28 May 2007	18	11	0	3	0
13	DF	Cyapon Jusuk	12 May 2007	18	0(2)	0	0	0
18	FW	Nattawat Tanasil	29 September 2008	17	1(5)	0	1	0
19	DF	Tanaphat Wangchan	29 March 2004	21	10	0	1	0
20	MF	Atthawut Srisawang	12 January 2008	17	1	0	0	0
21	GK	Apiwich Deesomjoranee	21 December 2008	17	10	0	0	0
22	FW	Krittamate Prasertsri	11 February 2005	20	1	0	0	0
23	DF	Sanhanat Thoagjan	26 May 2006	19	10(1)	0	3	0
27	DF	Arnuh Wongwaen	14 June 2006	19	4(4)	0	0	0
28	DF	Wongsakorn Somwongsa	18 February 2008	17	0	0	0	0
29	FW	Caelan Tanadon Ryan	12 October 2005	20	6(2)	2	1	0
30	MF	Tanapat Hongkhiao	30 December 2006	19	11	8	1	0
75	MF	Thanakit Duangtawan	2 January 2006	19	0(3)	0	2	1
Own goals					—	0	N/A	

=== Ratchaburi U21s ===
No.	Pos.	Name	Date of Birth	Age	League		Discipline	
No.	Pos.	Name	Date of Birth	Age	Apps	Goals	Yellow card	Red card
1	GK	Patthawut Chamchuen	5 March 2008	17	2	0	0	0
4	DF	Vorapat Pongpluek	21 July 2007	18	2(1)	0	0	0
6	DF	Natthawut Satitpong	31 May 2007	18	1(6)	0	1	0
9	FW	Pureewat Konnark	18 February 2008	17	2(2)	0	0	0
10	MF	Warathanan Chantakua	23 April 2008	17	0(4)	0	0	0
14	DF	Nattaphat Kasemsuk	14 May 2007	18	3(5)	1	0	0
15	MF	Bhubate Eric Kotler	21 April 2007	18	1	0	0	0
18	GK	Nattawat Muen-in	17 February 2007	18	9	0	0	0
20	DF	Nathapon Buathong	16 January 2006	19	2(2)	0	1	0
21	MF	Chayaput Wituranich	1 April 2007	18	9(2)	0	1	0
23	MF	Chinnaphat Yakaew	4 September 2007	18	6(2)	0	0	0
31	MF	Songkiad Chaikhong	23 July 2005	20	8(1)	0	2	0
32	MF	Dachatorn Tongsaibua	21 October 2006	19	6(2)	0	0	0
33	MF	Phiraphat Thueanmingmat	4 November 2007	18	10	0	3	0
35	FW	Nanthakon Phimket	19 August 2007	18	6(1)	0	0	0
36	DF	Thatsanaphon Khongsuk	11 August 2007	18	4(3)	0	1	0
38	DF	Tontrakan Rangsiri	13 January 2007	18	8(2)	2	2	0
45	DF	Anucha Patsaphan	8 November 2007	18	6(1)	0	1	0
54	FW	Chanon Soponpongpipat	25 January 2004	21	4(2)	0	0	0
55	MF	Nuttaphol Yenjai	2 May 2005	20	1(9)	0	1	0
58	MF	Tanakrit Phasook	28 September 2007	18	4(5)	2	2	0
91	MF	Veeraphat Kuntee	26 May 2005	20	11	3	1	0
95	DF	Panawat Naowabut	16 November 2005	20	9	0	1	1
98	DF	Sittipol Jumparaung	29 January 2005	20	7(3)	0	2	0
Own goals					—	0	N/A	

=== Suphanburi U21s ===
No.	Pos.	Name	Date of Birth	Age	League		Discipline	
No.	Pos.	Name	Date of Birth	Age	Apps	Goals	Yellow card	Red card
1	GK	Kunanon Chaengpia	23 June 2006	19	2	0	0	0
2	DF	Nattapon Sriboontam	14 February 2007	18	2(3)	0	0	0
3	DF	Phiphat Kongkoed	4 October 2007	18	6(1)	1	2	0
4	DF	Tanakorn Chujun	15 June 2005	20	6(2)	0	0	0
5	DF	Kittikawin Sesmapon	4 April 2009	16	9	0	1	0
7	MF	Nitirad Kaewsri	11 December 2009	16	2(4)	0	0	0
8	MF	Supphakrit Phaeardun	22 October 2004	21	2(4)	0	0	0
9	FW	Thammabut Kanchanaprasatporn	25 July 2008	17	0(8)	1	0	0
10	MF	Natthawut Aimaoeb	22 October 2007	18	0(2)	0	0	0
11	DF	Siraphat Detthanu	2 April 2006	19	2(1)	0	1	0
13	MF	Sutthipong Manmungsil	4 March 2006	19	9(1)	0	4	0
14	FW	Kanokpon Cherkota	1 August 2005	20	2	0	0	0
15	DF	Jessarit Meechan	11 July 2007	18	8(1)	1	1	0
16	DF	Ranyakorn Kraseasen	4 December 2005	20	4(6)	0	0	0
17	MF	Napop Chinna	19 November 2007	18	10(1)	3	2	0
19	MF	Nitiphum Kongsaou	28 June 2008	17	10	3	0	0
23	DF	Nutthaphong Samthong	2 July 2005	20	6	0	0	0
27	DF	Preerapat Khampo	13 March 2006	19	10(1)	0	1	0
28	MF	Kissaphon Chumjit	3 December 2007	18	11	2	1	0
30	DF	Gorawit Suerpitak	13 February 2008	17	0(6)	0	0	0
33	DF	Jinnathorn Sangkaew	30 August 2009	16	2(5)	0	0	0
35	GK	Phurin Aiadrueang	3 March 2010	15	9(1)	0	0	0
36	DF	Panai Jiawong	8 September 2007	18	9(1)	0	1	1
43	GK	Adison Khaosongtham	31 August 2007	18	0	0	0	0
Own goals					—	0	N/A	

=== Uthai Thani U21s ===
No.	Pos.	Name	Date of Birth	Age	League		Discipline	
No.	Pos.	Name	Date of Birth	Age	Apps	Goals	Yellow card	Red card
1	GK	Tharmatazs Cherdtrakul	23 January 2006	19	5	0	0	0
4	DF	Kantaphon Seelarat	28 February 2005	20	10	0	2	0
6	MF	Phoomthai Singchai	1 November 2005	20	7(4)	0	2	0
7	MF	Attachai Laepankaew	15 October 2004	21	8(2)	1	4	0
8	MF	Ruben Ciayton	12 May 2007	18	3(5)	1	1	0
9	FW	Pornpichet Jitthai	30 May 2007	18	8(2)	1	0	0
10	MF	Ananchai Thepsudee	1 February 2006	19	4(5)	0	0	0
11	FW	Satian Hanyuen	2 July 2004	21	4(4)	0	1	0
14	FW	Kannithi Waitayachaiwat	23 December 2005	20	1(4)	0	0	0
15	DF	Tanadol Chaipa	15 November 2004	21	11	0	1	0
16	MF	Surnnat Larpphonwirot	10 March 2005	20	4(5)	0	0	0
18	GK	Songphob Kathong	19 May 2008	17	3	0	0	0
19	FW	Surachai Chaphkdee	24 March 2007	18	7(4)	0	0	0
20	MF	Chavalwit Manosujarittham	10 February 2009	16	2(2)	0	0	0
23	MF	Saranpat Yingsakul	17 February 2005	20	8(1)	0	0	0
24	DF	Athip Khumma	22 October 2004	21	7(2)	0	2	0
44	MF	Theerapat Arsa	21 September 2004	21	4(1)	0	0	0
60	GK	Suppawat Meethongkom	14 February 2008	17	3	0	0	0
66	DF	Thanakorn Savangnate	14 March 2005	20	2(4)	0	0	0
67	MF	Pavarit Boonmalert	13 October 2007	18	0(1)	0	0	0
69	DF	Alexander Gountounas	25 April 2005	20	2(2)	0	0	0
70	DF	Andre Clayton	12 May 2007	18	7(2)	0	4	0
71	MF	Kristoffer Wisarut Ryberg	10 April 2004	21	4(1)	2	1	0
77	FW	Danai James Smart	27 November 2005	20	1	0	0	0
88	MF	Donyawat Sahaya	13 January 2007	18	6(1)	0	1	0
Own goals					—	0	N/A	
