= 2024 Thai U23 League =

Thai U23 League
- Season: 2024
- Dates: 18 September 2024 – 24 December 2024
- Champions: Nongbua Pitchaya U23s
- Matches: 56
- Goals: 171 (3.05 per match)
- Top goalscorer: Panupong Phuakphralap (13 goals; Nongbua Pitchaya U23s)
- Best goalkeeper: Phumeworapol Wannabutr (7 clean sheets; Buriram United U23s)
- Biggest home win: 6 goals difference Bangkok United U23s 7–1 Suphanburi U23s (19 September 2024); Bangkok United U23s 6–0 Port U23s (7 November 2024)
- Biggest away win: 4 goals difference Rayong U23s 0–4 Nongbua Pitchaya U23s (16 October 2024); Pattaya United U23s 1–5 Nongbua Pitchaya U23s (6 November 2024); Rayong U23s 0–4 Buriram United U23s (7 November 2024)
- Highest scoring: 8 goals Bangkok United U23s 7–1 Suphanburi U23s (19 September 2024)
- Longest winning run: 6 matches Nongbua Pitchaya U23s
- Longest unbeaten run: 14 matches Buriram United U23s; Nongbua Pitchaya U23s
- Longest winless run: 14 matches Rayong U23s
- Longest losing run: 6 matches Rayong U23s

The 2024 Thai U23 League was the inaugural season of the Youngster League, officially known for sponsorship reasons as the PEA U23 Youngster League, named after the Provincial Electricity Authority (PEA). Organised by the Football Association of Thailand (FA Thailand) and Thai League Co., Ltd., the competition was for Thai players under the age of 23 and featured 8 clubs. Each team played every other team twice, once at home and once away, with the team finishing with the most points crowned champions. The season ran from 18 September to 24 December 2024.

== Teams ==
The 2024 Thai U23 League features eight teams representing various provinces across Thailand. The majority of these teams are concentrated in the Central, Eastern, Western, and Northeastern regions, highlighting the strong football development in these areas. This regional distribution underscores the league's commitment to nurturing football talent nationwide.

=== Number of teams by province ===
Locations of the 2024 Thai U23 League teams

Position	Province	Number	Teams
1	Chonburi	2	Chonburi U23s and Pattaya United U23s
2	Bangkok	1	Port U23s
2	Buriram	1	Buriram United U23s
2	Nong Bua Lamphu	1	Nongbua Pitchaya U23s
2	Pathum Thani	1	Bangkok United U23s
2	Rayong	1	Rayong U23s
2	Suphanburi	1	Suphanburi U23s

=== Stadiums and locations ===
Team	Parent Club League	Location	Stadium	Coordinates
Bangkok United U23s	Thai League 1	Pathum Thani (Khlong Luang)	Thammasat Stadium	14°04′05″N 100°35′56″E
Buriram United U23s	Thai League 1	Buriram (Mueang)	Buriram City Stadium	14°56′45″N 103°06′12″E
Chonburi U23s	Thai League 2	Chonburi (Chonburi)	Chonburi Stadium	13°20′11″N 100°57′23″E
Nongbua Pitchaya U23s	Thai League 1	Nongbua Lamphu (Mueang)	Pitchaya Stadium	17°11′52″N 102°26′00″E
Pattaya United U23s	Thai League 2	Chonburi (Bang Lamung)	Nong Prue Stadium	12°55′28″N 100°56′14″E
Port U23s	Thai League 1	Bangkok (Sathon)	Stadium of Rajamangala University of Technology Krungthep	13°42′48″N 100°32′13″E
Rayong U23s	Thai League 1	Rayong (Mueang)	Rayong Provincial Stadium	12°40′49″N 101°14′08″E
Suphanburi U23s	Thai League 2	Suphanburi (Mueang)	Stadium of Suphanburi Sports School	14°28′21″N 100°05′19″E

== League table ==
=== Standings ===
Pos	Team	Pld	W	D	L	GF	GA	GD	Pts
1	Nongbua Pitchaya U23s (C)	14	8	6	0	35	9	+26	30 (Note: The head-to-head record is tied; Nongbua Pitchaya U23s 2 pts (GD 0), Buriram United U23s 2 pts (GD 0). Nongbua Pitchaya U23s is ahead on the overall goals difference.)
2	Buriram United U23s	14	8	6	0	26	4	+22	30
3	Bangkok United U23s	14	5	7	2	37	21	+16	22
4	Chonburi U23s	14	5	6	3	20	16	+4	21
5	Pattaya United U23s	14	3	5	6	16	22	−6	14
6	Suphanburi U23s	14	3	3	8	16	32	−16	12 (Note: Suphanburi U23s ahead on head-to-head points record; Suphanburi U23s 4 pts, Port U23s 1 pt.)
7	Port U23s	14	2	6	6	12	28	−16	12
8	Rayong U23s	14	0	5	9	9	39	−30	5

Source: Thai League
Rules for classification: 1) Points; 2) Head-to-head points; 3) Head-to-head goal difference; 4) Head-to-head goal scored; 5) Overall goal difference; 6) Overall goal scored; 7) Fair play points; 8) Play-off without extra time).
(C) Champions

=== Positions by round ===
Team ╲ Round	1	2	3	4	5	6	7	8	9	10	11	12	13	14
Nongbua Pitchaya U23s	7	3	1	1	1	1	1	1	1	1	1	1	1	1
Buriram United U23s	6	7	4	5	3	2	2	2	2	2	2	2	2	2
Bangkok United U23s	1	1	2	2	2	4	3	3	3	3	3	3	3	3
Chonburi U23s	4	2	3	4	5	3	4	4	4	4	4	4	4	4
Pattaya United U23s	2	5	6	3	4	5	5	5	5	6	5	7	6	5
Suphanburi U23s	8	8	5	6	7	6	8	7	6	5	6	6	7	6
Port U23s	5	6	7	8	8	8	7	8	7	7	7	5	5	7
Rayong U23s	3	4	8	7	6	7	6	6	8	8	8	8	8	8

Source: Thai League
= Leader

=== Results by round ===
Team ╲ Round	1	2	3	4	5	6	7	8	9	10	11	12	13	14
Nongbua Pitchaya U23s	W	W	W	W	W	W	D	W	D	W	D	D	D	D
Buriram United U23s	W	D	W	W	W	D	W	D	W	W	W	D	D	D
Bangkok United U23s	W	W	L	D	D	L	D	W	W	W	D	D	D	D
Chonburi U23s	D	W	L	D	D	W	L	W	W	L	D	D	D	W
Pattaya United U23s	D	L	D	W	D	L	D	L	L	L	D	L	W	W
Suphanburi U23s	L	L	W	L	L	D	L	L	D	W	L	W	L	D
Port U23s	D	L	D	L	L	D	D	L	D	L	W	D	W	L
Rayong U23s	D	L	D	D	L	D	L	L	L	L	L	L	D	L

Source: Thai League
W = Won; D = Drawn; L = Lost

=== Results ===
Home \ Away	BKU	BRU	CBR	NBP	PAT	POR	RYG	SPB
Bangkok United U23s	—	1–1	1–2	2–2	2–2	6–0	5–0	7–1
Buriram United U23s	0–0	—	1–0	0–0	2–0	4–0	5–0	4–1
Chonburi U23s	2–4	0–0	—	2–2	3–0	0–0	1–1	3–0
Nongbua Pitchaya U23s	4–0	0–0	3–1	—	2–1	4–1	5–0	3–0
Pattaya United U23s	2–2	0–2	1–1	1–5	—	1–1	2–0	3–0
Port U23s	2–4	1–1	0–1	1–1	1–0	—	1–1	0–2
Rayong U23s	2–2	0–4	1–1	0–4	1–1	1–2	—	0–2
Suphanburi U23s	1–1	1–2	2–3	0–0	0–2	2–2	4–2	—

Source: Thai League
Legend: Blue = home team win; Yellow = draw; Red = away team win.
For upcoming matches, an "a" indicates there is an article about the rivalry between the two participants.

== Season statistics ==
=== Top scorers ===
As of 24 December 2024.

Rank	Player	Club	Goals
1	Panupong Phuakphralap	Nongbua Pitchaya U23s	13
2	Chukid Wanpraphao	Bangkok United U23s	9
3	Shunta Hasegawa	Bangkok United U23s	7
4	Panupong Wongpila	Buriram United U23s	6
4	Thanakrit Chotmuangpak	Buriram United U23s	6
4	Siraphop Wandee	Chonburi U23s	6
4	Thanawut Phochai	Nongbua Pitchaya U23s	6

=== Hat-tricks ===
Player	For	Against	Result	Date
Shunta Hasegawa	Bangkok United U23s	Suphanburi U23s	7–1 (H)	19 September 2024
Panupong Phuakphralap	Nongbua Pitchaya U23s	Pattaya United U23s	5–1 (A)	6 November 2024
Chukid Wanpraphao	Bangkok United U23s	Port U23s	6–0 (H)	7 November 2024
Guntapon Keereeleang	Bangkok United U23s	Rayong U23s	5–0 (H)	21 November 2024

Notes: (H) = Home team; (A) = Away team

=== Clean sheets ===
As of 24 December 2024.

Rank	Player	Club	Clean sheets
1	Phumeworapol Wannabutr	Buriram United U23s	7
2	Thanakit Auttharak	Nongbua Pitchaya U23s	6
3	Kittipong Bunmak	Buriram United U23s	3
3	Chommaphat Boonloet	Chonburi U23s	3
3	Nattakitt Kanapornthawornpat	Pattaya United U23s	3

== Team Squad statistics ==
=== Bangkok United U23s ===
No.	Pos.	Name	Date of birth	Age	League		Discipline	
No.	Pos.	Name	Date of birth	Age	Apps	Goals	Yellow card	Red card
1	GK	Supanut Sudathip	22 June 2006	18	8	0	0	0
2	DF	Kittisak Dangsakul	14 October 2005	19	13(1)	0	2	0
3	DF	Anapat Nakngam	9 July 2004	20	13	0	0	0
4	DF	Wichan Inaram	10 July 2007	17	2(4)	0	1	0
5	DF	Warakorn Huatwiset	28 October 2005	19	8(6)	0	3	0
6	MF	Sirayos Dansakul	22 January 2004	20	11(1)	0	1	0
7	MF	Chonlachart Tongjinda	31 March 2005	19	11(2)	0	0	0
8	MF	Natcha Promsomboon	8 February 2001	23	9	1	4	0
9	FW	Guntapon Keereeleang	22 January 2001	23	2	3	0	0
10	FW	Chukid Wanpraphao	2 July 2001	23	8	9	3	0
11	FW	Nopparat Promiem	1 August 2004	20	12(2)	5	0	0
12	GK	Naphol Wongboon	26 April 2004	20	6	0	0	0
13	FW	Napat Kuttanan	10 February 2005	19	7(1)	4	2	0
14	MF	Shunta Hasegawa	25 April 2005	19	10(2)	7	0	0
15	DF	Nontapat Ploymee	6 February 2006	18	11(2)	1	2	0
16	MF	Philip Bijawat Frey	15 November 2006	18	9(4)	1	0	0
18	MF	Aekkarat Sansuwan	8 June 2006	18	7(5)	1	1	0
19	FW	Krit Klangpan	13 February 2006	18	4(8)	3	0	0
20	DF	Kongpop Sodsong	24 March 2006	18	1(3)	0	0	0
21	FW	Patharapol Sanprasit	27 February 2006	18	1(4)	0	0	0
22	MF	Pichaya Kongsri	3 August 2007	17	1(3)	0	0	0
23	MF	Pachara Wangsawat	4 September 2007	17	0(2)	0	0	0
24	FW	Thanawat Deelert	1 January 2007	17	0(3)	0	0	0
25	GK	Phattharaphon Kaewwongthong	13 February 2007	17	0	0	0	0
Own goals					—	0	N/A	

=== Buriram United U23s ===
No.	Pos.	Name	Date of birth	Age	League		Discipline	
No.	Pos.	Name	Date of birth	Age	Apps	Goals	Yellow card	Red card
4	MF	Leon James	29 August 2001	23	12	0	1	0
21	FW	Caelan Tanadon Ryan	12 October 2005	19	3(6)	0	4	1
35	GK	Kittipong Bunmak	22 March 2005	19	2(1)	0	0	0
44	MF	Thanakrit Chotmuangpak	1 September 2006	18	11(2)	6	1	0
48	DF	Wanthayawut Nuchkasae	25 September 2005	19	3(5)	1	1	0
49	MF	Piyawat Petra	15 March 2005	19	6(1)	1	0	0
50	DF	Singha Marasa	19 August 2006	18	12(2)	1	3	0
54	FW	Nathakorn Rattanasuwan	5 February 2007	17	1(8)	1	2	0
55	MF	Thanyakon Swangsuk	29 May 2007	17	1(3)	1	1	0
63	DF	Jhetsaphat Khuantanom	28 January 2005	19	9(2)	0	2	0
66	DF	Pikanet Laohawiwat	4 March 2005	19	12(1)	0	2	0
70	MF	Jirapong Pungviravong	20 September 2006	18	2(6)	2	1	0
71	MF	Ratthaphum Phankhechon	25 May 2005	19	10(4)	1	2	0
72	MF	Chanothai Kongmeng	7 March 2006	18	2(5)	0	0	0
75	GK	Phumeworapol Wannabutr	14 October 2004	20	10	0	1	1
77	MF	Paripan Wongsa	19 March 2005	19	10(4)	3	2	0
78	DF	Supanat Mahawai	12 April 2007	17	1(5)	0	0	0
80	MF	Navapan Thianchai	27 January 2003	21	4(6)	1	0	0
88	MF	Dutsadee Buranajutanon	7 March 2006	18	14	1	3	0
90	FW	Panupong Wongpila	15 February 2003	21	11	6	2	0
91	FW	Phumin William Boers	15 January 2003	21	13	1	3	0
95	MF	Seksan Ratree	14 March 2003	21	3	0	0	0
98	GK	Anut Samran	16 April 2006	18	2	0	0	0
Own goals					—	0	N/A	

=== Chonburi U23s ===
No.	Pos.	Name	Date of birth	Age	League		Discipline	
No.	Pos.	Name	Date of birth	Age	Apps	Goals	Yellow card	Red card
15	DF	Jakkapong Sanmahung	6 April 2002	22	3	0	0	0
19	MF	Kasidit Kalasin	2 July 2004	20	7	0	1	0
20	MF	Suksan Bunta	5 March 2002	22	6	1	1	0
22	GK	Chommaphat Boonloet	17 February 2003	21	6	0	1	0
52	MF	Pansakorn On-mo	25 May 2009	15	9	3	0	0
72	DF	Aksaraphak Aditpas	2 February 2006	18	2(7)	1	1	0
73	MF	Apiwich Laorkhai	22 February 2007	17	11(1)	0	2	1
74	DF	Porrameth Ittiprasert	13 June 2006	18	7(4)	1	3	0
75	DF	Sutthiwat Chamnan	4 January 2006	18	0(9)	0	0	0
76	MF	Kunkawee Manphian	7 October 2006	18	8(3)	0	2	0
78	MF	Kanapod Singsai	5 February 2007	17	9(4)	1	0	0
79	FW	Sirawit Benchamat	2 March 2006	18	8(5)	2	0	0
86	DF	Parinya Nusong	7 April 2005	19	6(1)	0	1	0
87	GK	Thanawat Panthong	6 April 2004	20	8	0	0	0
89	DF	Jeerapong Chamsakul	4 January 2007	17	12(1)	0	2	0
90	GK	Tissanu Khuptanavin	21 January 2005	19	0(1)	0	0	0
91	DF	Phongsakon Trisat	19 March 2001	23	9(1)	0	4	0
93	FW	Siraphop Wandee	22 January 2004	20	9(1)	6	2	1
94	MF	Yotsakorn Natthasit	29 May 2004	20	10(1)	0	1	1
97	FW	Roengchai Kesada	27 July 2005	19	13	5	0	0
98	MF	Naphat Chumpanya	26 February 2007	17	11(1)	0	5	1
Own goals					—	0	N/A	

=== Nongbua Pitchaya U23s ===
No.	Pos.	Name	Date of birth	Age	League		Discipline	
No.	Pos.	Name	Date of birth	Age	Apps	Goals	Yellow card	Red card
1	GK	Supakorn Poonphol	25 September 2008	16	2	0	0	0
2	DF	Athipat Saengprakai	10 November 2002	22	12	2	4	0
4	DF	Pitiphat Chankham	6 February 2003	21	2(4)	0	0	0
13	FW	Phongphat Pholphut	23 November 2003	21	3(6)	0	1	0
14	FW	Thanawut Phochai	2 December 2005	19	11(1)	6	0	0
19	FW	Jhakkarin Sitthichan	9 February 2006	18	1(12)	2	1	0
21	FW	Pattaraaek Promna	7 February 2006	18	0	0	0	0
22	MF	Pattaratron Buransuk	24 October 2007	17	11(1)	2	1	0
24	MF	Piyaphat Thaensopha	3 January 2006	18	1(6)	0	1	0
28	MF	Sukakree Inngam	26 December 2002	22	5(5)	0	3	0
32	GK	Thanakit Auttharak	17 March 2006	18	12	0	1	0
33	DF	Nutthawat Laksanangam	4 April 2003	21	13	0	2	0
34	FW	Thanakrit Jampalee	20 March 2006	18	0(3)	0	0	0
38	DF	Nattapat Wongwichakorn	9 March 2006	18	0(2)	0	0	0
39	FW	Kasidit Maipho	26 November 2004	20	0(6)	0	2	1
40	FW	Naratip Kittikananurak	9 December 2008	16	0(3)	1	0	0
41	MF	Phanthakan Artsombun	15 July 2004	20	14	1	0	0
44	DF	Wongsakorn Seesawai	19 February 2007	17	3(1)	0	0	0
47	DF	Yuttajak Jaikla	5 January 2006	18	2(2)	0	0	0
49	MF	Chotiphat Sicumsaeng	28 February 2006	18	0(6)	0	1	0
54	DF	Pattaraburin Jannawan	5 July 2005	19	12	0	4	0
69	MF	Pakorn Seekaewnit	26 July 2002	22	12	2	2	0
77	FW	Peeranan Baukhai	17 June 2005	19	14	4	0	0
90	FW	Natdanai Chudtale	17 May 2006	18	10(3)	2	0	0
95	FW	Panupong Phuakphralap	9 October 2002	22	14	13	2	0
Own goals					—	0	N/A	

=== Pattaya United U23s ===
No.	Pos.	Name	Date of birth	Age	League		Discipline	
No.	Pos.	Name	Date of birth	Age	Apps	Goals	Yellow card	Red card
1	GK	Sutaporn Kongwut	20 January 2003	21	2(1)	0	0	0
7	FW	Athiphat Petcharat	6 August 2002	22	13(1)	3	3	0
8	MF	Kullapat Sukphuwong	4 November 2002	22	0(5)	0	3	1
11	FW	Paroonrit Singnon	5 September 2001	23	13(1)	2	1	0
14	MF	Korawit Prasatsaeng	11 May 2008	16	11(1)	1	3	0
15	MF	Siwaluk Ob-oun	31 October 2008	16	2(6)	0	1	0
17	FW	Wanitchanan Chantawadee	19 December 2001	23	10(3)	0	1	0
18	GK	Akrachai Khaoprasert	18 March 2001	23	0	0	0	0
19	DF	Tony Laurent-gonnet	1 May 2003	21	2	0	0	0
21	FW	Phutawan Thongmusit	8 May 2008	16	2(4)	0	0	0
25	MF	Manasanan Chaosuantang	12 March 2003	21	6(7)	0	1	0
27	MF	Masato Sugiharto	7 June 2009	15	0(1)	0	0	0
28	DF	Chanyut Singtum	25 November 2001	23	2(3)	0	2	1
31	GK	Nattakitt Kanapornthawornpat	31 May 2002	22	12	0	1	0
44	DF	Puttipong Chanchaemsri	2 May 2003	21	14	0	1	0
47	DF	Gorawit Wongkrai	27 December 2004	20	13	2	5	0
48	MF	Weeraphat Phothanom	9 June 2005	19	12(2)	1	1	0
51	MF	Park Joon-yeong	14 July 2008	16	3(6)	0	1	0
66	DF	Natpisit Chompoonuch	20 January 2004	20	3(2)	0	1	0
69	FW	Thanawat Srisawat	28 April 2004	20	6(5)	2	4	0
77	FW	Thanakit Duangtawan	30 October 2006	18	2(2)	0	0	0
78	DF	Phurit Boonparsit	24 May 2004	20	1(1)	0	0	0
86	FW	Attapon Laepankaew	15 October 2004	20	13	3	4	0
87	MF	Attachai Laepankaew	15 October 2004	20	11	2	6	0
88	DF	Thanakorn Singkhokkruad	24 February 2003	21	1	0	0	0
Own goals					—	0	N/A	

=== Port U23s ===
No.	Pos.	Name	Date of birth	Age	League		Discipline	
No.	Pos.	Name	Date of birth	Age	Apps	Goals	Yellow card	Red card
1	GK	Natthawut Phubun	18 March 2004	20	5	0	0	1
2	DF	Thanakrit Phonthongtin	21 January 2002	22	11	0	4	0
3	MF	Adison Wantea	28 September 2004	20	11(2)	0	1	0
4	DF	Chinphak Nonyaso	1 October 2006	18	8(4)	0	0	0
5	DF	Dhammanoon Chiangkasem	30 August 2007	17	8(2)	0	4	1
6	DF	Nutpisit Maneechote	18 August 2005	19	1(6)	0	0	0
7	FW	Arnon Phaengsa	25 June 2006	18	3(10)	0	1	0
10	FW	Ruben Ciayton	12 May 2007	17	1(6)	0	2	0
11	MF	Sattaboot Kunsuk	17 January 2003	21	6(1)	1	1	0
12	MF	Weerat Tuhian	28 May 2007	17	13	0	5	0
13	DF	Cyapon Jusuk	12 May 2007	17	5(3)	0	0	0
14	DF	Wacharachai Phothibal	29 February 2004	20	9(3)	2	2	0
16	FW	Andre Clayton	12 May 2007	17	2(1)	0	1	0
17	DF	Nattawut Esa	17 February 2002	22	10(3)	3	3	0
18	FW	Nattawat Tanasil	29 September 2008	16	1(3)	0	1	0
19	DF	Tanaphat Wangchan	29 March 2004	20	11	0	1	1
20	FW	Phakhawat Sapphaso	20 November 2005	19	11	4	4	0
22	FW	Kannithi Waitayachaiwat	23 December 2005	19	7(1)	0	0	0
23	DF	Sanhanat Thoagjan	26 May 2006	18	7(3)	0	1	0
31	GK	Chanchai Thongsuk	13 September 2004	20	4	0	0	0
38	FW	Natthakit Phosri	8 February 2008	16	1(3)	0	1	0
44	MF	Purachet Wattananusit	31 January 2002	22	7(7)	0	1	0
47	FW	Wuttichai Aladwaree	25 March 2004	20	1	0	0	0
49	FW	Alif Yamasare	9 May 2006	18	6(5)	2	0	0
97	GK	Thiraphat Saenwandee	10 April 2007	17	5(1)	0	1	0
Own goals					—	2	N/A	

=== Rayong U23s ===
No.	Pos.	Name	Date of birth	Age	League		Discipline	
No.	Pos.	Name	Date of birth	Age	Apps	Goals	Yellow card	Red card
1	GK	Napat Damrit	3 January 2005	19	7	0	0	0
5	DF	Kittisak Kunrat	24 March 2003	21	6(3)	0	0	0
6	DF	Kamut Phudsranoy	7 November 2003	21	10(4)	0	1	0
8	MF	Wattanapong Withunat	10 December 2004	20	14	3	3	0
10	FW	Thanawat Dechkla	2 July 2005	19	6(1)	2	0	0
11	FW	Suwijak Tipsena	30 January 2003	21	14	3	0	0
13	DF	Nasru Beraheng	11 January 2003	21	5(1)	0	1	0
14	DF	Kritsanapong Suphap	6 February 2006	18	6(5)	0	2	0
17	MF	Natdanai Hongkum	26 December 2005	19	8(3)	0	1	0
18	GK	Narongkorn Saenardtho	26 August 2004	20	2	0	0	0
19	DF	Thanakit Nuaim	19 July 2004	20	11(2)	1	2	0
20	MF	Nattawut Okas	9 September 2004	20	8(4)	0	1	0
21	MF	Treepop Pechkhot	15 August 2004	20	11(2)	0	4	0
22	DF	Jirapan Kerdmanee	7 December 2004	20	2(2)	0	1	0
23	MF	Nonthawat Bathong	23 May 2006	18	8(3)	0	2	0
24	MF	Settavut Sangsuwan	24 April 2003	21	0(3)	0	2	0
25	GK	Panomgorn Pimpa	13 June 2005	19	5	0	0	0
27	MF	Phueniuang Pupaboon	30 December 2004	20	3(3)	0	2	0
28	MF	Sutthiphong Phraokaew	22 July 2005	19	1(2)	0	0	0
30	DF	Mongkhol Khumsuk	7 May 2004	20	3(3)	0	2	0
31	FW	Krirati Laingsuk	31 March 2004	20	5(2)	0	2	0
33	DF	Kittiphat Kullapha	6 December 2004	20	13(1)	0	1	0
39	DF	Nontakorn Saitaen	9 July 2007	17	0(2)	0	0	0
40	FW	Aritach Jaemsri	24 January 2007	17	3(9)	0	1	0
49	MF	Anuwat Chuab-ram	16 July 2006	18	3(7)	0	0	0
Own goals					—	0	N/A	

=== Suphanburi U23s ===
No.	Pos.	Name	Date of birth	Age	League		Discipline	
No.	Pos.	Name	Date of birth	Age	Apps	Goals	Yellow card	Red card
8	MF	Punnawat Chote-jirachaithon	13 June 2002	22	9(2)	0	2	0
11	FW	Saman Mohammadzadeh	30 August 2001	23	3(6)	4	1	0
14	FW	Phanuwat Namatsila	1 February 2006	18	1(5)	0	0	0
15	FW	Mongkhonchai Lekpimai	11 February 2006	18	9(1)	3	1	0
18	MF	Nisofron Padorlee	13 March 2006	18	7(6)	0	1	0
20	DF	Pethay Promjan	23 March 2006	18	12	0	1	1
21	MF	Nattapong Hamontree	13 October 2005	19	9(2)	1	5	0
26	MF	Nanthiphat Samingnakorn	24 January 2006	18	9	2	0	0
27	MF	Jukkree U-ta	6 April 2006	18	4(1)	0	0	0
28	GK	Phurin Aiadrueang	3 March 2010	14	2	0	0	0
29	FW	Nattanai Dajaroen	30 January 2006	18	14	4	1	0
32	MF	Pongthanut Chiraphatcharawat	13 April 2001	23	3(4)	0	0	0
33	FW	Nonkrit Sukontawat	1 April 2007	17	9(2)	0	0	0
34	MF	Thanarat Srimanop	29 January 2006	18	5(3)	0	1	0
35	GK	Ratchaphon Namthong	28 April 2001	23	12	0	0	0
36	MF	Rapeephat Padthaisong	12 December 2005	19	7(3)	1	0	0
37	DF	Pittawat Jeenthai	18 March 2006	18	6(2)	0	1	0
38	FW	Apiwat Kaewbut	5 March 2006	18	3(7)	0	1	0
39	DF	Panupong Ngoenjungreed	29 September 2005	19	12(1)	1	0	0
41	MF	Yodsaphat Meekaew	4 April 2006	18	8(4)	0	0	0
43	FW	Akarawit Techovongsakul	24 September 2006	18	4(3)	0	1	0
44	DF	Chaiwat Janekarnwanit	24 June 2003	21	4(4)	0	1	0
45	GK	Puttisak Plongnaiwon	2 April 2007	17	0	0	0	0
46	MF	Phanuwit Malalueang	12 July 2006	18	0(3)	0	2	0
55	FW	Aisara Chomphuthat	18 January 2006	18	2(2)	0	1	0
Own goals					—	0	N/A	
