= Thai U21 League =

- Organising body: Thai League Co., Ltd.
- Founded: 2024; 2 years ago
- First season: 2024
- Country: Thailand
- Number of clubs: 12 (since 2025)
- Current champions: Nongbua Pitchaya U23s (1st title) (2024)
- Most championships: Nongbua Pitchaya U23s (1 title)
- Top scorer: Panupong Phuakphralap (13)
- Sponsor(s): Provincial Electricity Authority
- Website: Thai League
- Current: 2026–27 Thai U21 League

The Thai U21 League (Thai: ไทยลีก รุ่นอายุไม่เกิน 21 ปี) is a professional football league in Thailand designed specifically for players under the age of 21. Established by the Football Association of Thailand (FA Thailand), the league is managed and organized by Thai League Co., Ltd., responsible for overseeing the various tiers of Thai football competitions. The creation of the Thai U21 League marks a significant effort to foster young Thai football talent and provide a platform for emerging players to develop their skills.

== History ==
The Thai U23 League was established with the inaugural season set to commence in 2024, made possible through the sponsorship of the Provincial Electricity Authority (PEA), which served as the main sponsor. Consequently, the league was branded as the PEA U23 Youngster League (Thai: พีอีเอ ยู23 ยังส์เตอร์ ลีก) to reflect this partnership. The involvement of PEA as a sponsor underscores a commitment to supporting the development of young football talent in Thailand. The inaugural season featured participation from eight teams, comprising five clubs whose senior squads compete in Thai League 1, and three clubs from Thai League 2.

In 2025, the competition underwent a structural adjustment, lowering the age limit from under-23 to under-21, and was accordingly rebranded as the Thai U21 League. With PEA continuing as the main sponsor, the league adopted the official title PEA U21 Youngster League (Thai: พีอีเอ ยู21 ยังส์เตอร์ ลีก). The league continued to admit teams affiliated with clubs competing in the Thai League 1 and the Thai League 2. In addition, special privileges were granted to clubs that had previously participated in the 2024 Thai U23 League: even if their senior squads were relegated to Thai League 3, they retained eligibility to compete in the new U21 format. Other clubs from Thai League 3, however, were not permitted to enter unless they met this specific criterion. This regulation ensured continuity for developmental squads while maintaining the league's focus on nurturing youth players from the top tiers of Thai football.

In 2026, the competition expanded to 16 clubs for the 2026–27 season and introduced several major changes to its format and player eligibility. The league stage was divided into two groups of eight, followed by single-match ranking games to determine the final standings. For the first time, clubs were permitted to field up to three over-age Thai players and one foreign player, while at least seven eligible Thai U21 players were required to be on the field. Matches level after 90 minutes were decided by a penalty shootout.

== Clubs ==
=== List of champions ===
U23 format
#	Season	Winners (awarded 500,000 THB)	Runners-up (awarded 250,000 THB)	Third place (awarded 150,000 THB)	Fourth place (awarded 100,000 THB)	Winning head coach
1	2024	Nongbua Pitchaya U23s	Buriram United U23s	Bangkok United U23s	Chonburi U23s	(Thailand) Attapong Siripak
U21 format
#	Season	Winners (awarded 500,000 THB)	Runners-up (awarded 250,000 THB)	Third place (awarded 150,000 THB)	Fourth place (awarded 100,000 THB)	Winning head coach
2	2025	Bangkok United U21s	Buriram United U21s	Kasetsart U21s, Nongbua Pitchaya U21s	—	(Thailand) Jirawat Lainananukul
3	2026–27					

=== Total titles won ===
U23 format
Rank	Club	Winners	Runners-up	Winning seasons
1	Nongbua Pitchaya U23s	1	0	2024
2	Buriram United U23s	0	1	
U21 format
Rank	Club	Winners	Runners-up	Winning seasons
1	Bangkok United U21s	1	0	2025
2	Buriram United U21s	0	1	

=== Current season ===
In the 2026–27 season of the Thai U21 League, a total of 16 clubs are set to participate. Among these, eight clubs are affiliated with clubs whose senior squads are competing in the 2026–27 Thai League 1, six clubs are linked to clubs whose senior squads are participating in the 2026–27 Thai League 2, and two clubs are affiliated with clubs competing in the 2026–27 Thai League 3.

2026–27 Clubs	2026–27 Parent Club League	First season	Seasons	U23 or U21 League titles
Bangkok United U21s	Thai League 1	2024	3	1
BG Pathum United U21s	Thai League 1	2026–27	1	0
Buriram United U21s	Thai League 1	2024	3	0
Chainat Hornbill U21s	Thai League 2	2026–27	1	0
Chonburi U21s	Thai League 1	2024	3	0
Kanchanaburi Power U21s	Thai League 2	2025	2	0
Kasem Bundit University U21s	Thai League 3	2026–27	1	0
Kasetsart U21s	Thai League 2	2025	2	0
Khon Kaen United U21s	Thai League 2	2026–27	1	0
Nongbua Pitchaya U21s	Thai League 2	2024	3	1
Pattaya United U21s	Thai League 2	2024	3	0
Port U21s	Thai League 1	2024	3	0
PT Prachuap U21s	Thai League 1	2026–27	1	0
Rasisalai United U21s	Thai League 1	2026–27	1	0
Rayong U21s	Thai League 1	2024	2	0
Suphanburi U21s	Thai League 3	2024	3	0

=== Former clubs ===
Clubs	2026–27 Parent Club League	First season	Latest season	Seasons	U23 or U21 League titles
Nakhon Ratchasima Mazda U21s	Thai League 2	2025	2025	1	0
Ratchaburi U21s	Thai League 1	2025	2025	1	0
Uthai Thani U21s	Thai League 1	2025	2025	1	0

== Competition format ==
The competition consists of two stages: the league stage and the ranking matches.

=== League stage ===
The 16 participating clubs are divided into two groups of eight. Each club plays every other club in its group twice, once at home and once away. Each club also plays every club in the other group once, either at home or away, giving each club a total of 22 matches during the league stage.

Three points are awarded for a win. If a match is drawn after 90 minutes, the winner is determined by a penalty shoot-out. The team winning the penalty shoot-out receives two points, while the losing team receives one point. Goals scored during the penalty shoot-out are not counted in the league standings.

At the end of the league stage, the clubs in each group are ranked according to their accumulated points. In the event of a tie on points, the ranking criteria are applied in the following order:

1. Overall goal difference
2. Overall goals scored
3. Points in head-to-head matches, or mini-league points when more than two clubs are tied
4. Goal difference in head-to-head matches, or mini-league
5. Goals scored in head-to-head matches, or mini-league
6. Fair play points based on accumulated yellow and red cards

Once a criterion separates the tied clubs, subsequent criteria are not considered.

=== Ranking matches ===
After the league stage, clubs finishing in the same position in the two groups are paired against each other in a single ranking match. The first-placed clubs play for the championship, with the winner crowned league champion and the loser finishing second.

From third place onwards, the remaining pairs play to determine the final standings. The winner of each match is placed higher than the loser, with the matches continuing consecutively through the rankings until all participating clubs have been placed.

For the ranking matches, the higher-ranked club is designated as the home team based on its total points from the league stage. If a match is drawn after 90 minutes, the winner is determined by a penalty shoot-out, with no extra time.

== Awards ==
The Thai U21 League awards prize money to the top four teams at the end of each season. The champion is awarded 500,000 THB (฿), the runner-up receives 250,000 ฿, the team finishing in third place is granted 150,000 ฿, and the team that finishes fourth is awarded 100,000 ฿. These prizes incentivize the teams to perform at their best throughout the competition.

== Sponsorship ==
The Thai U21 League operates under a dynamic sponsorship model, where the main sponsor each season is granted the naming rights of the league. Depending on the primary sponsor, this allows the league's name to change from season to season.

- 2024: Provincial Electricity Authority (PEA U23 Youngster League)
- 2025–Present: Provincial Electricity Authority (PEA U21 Youngster League)
