= Kasetsart =

Kasetsart may refer to:

- Kasetsart University, a public research university in Bangkok, Thailand
  - Kasetsart University Kamphaeng Saen Campus Stadium, Kamphaeng Saen, Nakhon Pathom, Thailand
  - Kasetsart University BTS station, BTS Skytrain station in Bangkok
  - Kasetsart F.C., a Thai association football club
  - Kasetsart University Laboratory School, a public laboratory school in Bangkok affiliated with the university
