= Kittikai Juntaraksa =

Thai footballer (born 1996)

Personal information
- Full name: Kittikai Juntaraksa
- Date of birth: 7 April 1996 (age 30)
- Place of birth: Nakhon Phanom, Thailand
- Height: 1.75 m (5 ft 9 in)
- Position: Midfielder

Team information
- Current team: Pattaya United
- Number: 23

Youth career
- 2012–2015: Assumption College Sriracha

Senior career*
Years	Team	Apps	(Gls)
2015–2017	Air Force United	49	(6)
2018–2019	Ratchaburi Mitr Phol	0	(0)
2018	→ Sisaket (loan)	4	(0)
2018	→ Ubon UMT United (loan)	11	(1)
2019	→ Nongbua Pitchaya (loan)	10	(0)
2019	→ Sukhothai (loan)	11	(1)
2020–2021	Sukhothai	1	(0)
2020–2021	→ Sisaket (loan)	16	(2)
2021–2022	Rayong	26	(3)
2022	Rajpracha	11	(0)
2023	Samut Prakan City	15	(3)
2023–2024	Phrae United	3	(0)
2024–	Pattaya United	0	(0)

International career
2014–2015	Thailand U19	2	(0)
- * Club domestic league appearances and goals as of 30 April 2024

Kittikai Juntaraksa (Thai: กิตติไกร จันทะรักษา, born 7 April 1996) is a Thai professional footballer who plays as a midfielder for Pattaya United.

== International career ==
Kittikai was part of Thailand U19's squad in the 2014 Hassanal Bolkiah Trophy.
