= Pattaya United F.C. =

Pattaya United F.C. may refer to:

- Pattaya United F.C. (2008), a Thai football club under this name from 2008 to 2018, when it relocated and was renamed to Samut Prakan City F.C.
- Pattaya United F.C. (2023), a Thai football club previously known as Pattaya Dolphins United F.C.
