= Chommaphat Boonloet =

Thai footballer (born 2003)

Personal information
- Full name: Chommaphat Boonloet
- Date of birth: 17 February 2003 (age 23)
- Place of birth: Kalasin, Thailand
- Height: 1.84 m (6 ft 1/2 in)
- Position: Goalkeeper

Team information
- Current team: Pattaya United (on loan from Chonburi)
- Number: 96

Youth career
- 2018–2020: Chonburi

Senior career*
Years	Team	Apps	(Gls)
2020–	Chonburi	8	(0)
2020–2021	→ Banbueng (loan)	18	(0)
2023–2024	→ Phrae United (loan)	14	(0)
2025–	→ Pattaya United (loan)	20	(0)

International career
2022	Thailand U19	2	(0)
2022–	Thailand U23	4	(0)
- * Club domestic league appearances and goals as of 22 March 2026

Chommaphat Boonloet (Thai: ชมพัฒน์ บุญเลิศ, born 17 February 2003) is a Thai professional footballer who plays as a goalkeeper for Thai League 2 club Pattaya United.

== Career ==
Chommaphat is a product of Chonburi's academy and joined the first team in the second leg of the 2021–22 Thai League 1. On 29 October 2022, at 19 years old, he made his Thai League 1 debut for Chonburi against Sukhothai, where both teams drew 1-1.

== International career ==
Chommaphat represented Thailand U19 in the 2022 AFF U-19 Youth Championship.
