= Narongrit Boonsuk =

Thai footballer

Personal information
- Full name: Narongrit Boonsuk
- Date of birth: 4 June 1992 (age 34)
- Place of birth: Bangkok, Thailand
- Height: 1.88 m (6 ft 2 in)
- Position: Centre back

Team information
- Current team: Pattaya United
- Number: 34

Youth career
- 2008: Assumption College
- 2009–2010: Pattaya United

Senior career*
Years	Team	Apps	(Gls)
2011–2014	Sisaket	76	(0)
2015–2016	PTT Rayong	21	(0)
2017–2021	Sukhothai	42	(1)
2020–2021	→ Chiangmai United (loan)	0	(0)
2021	→ Khonkaen United (loan)	18	(0)
2021	Khonkaen United	17	(2)
2022–2023	Nakhon Si United	8	(0)
2023–2024	Bankhai United	24	(0)

International career
2013	Thailand U23		
- * Club domestic league appearances and goals as of 30 April 2023

Narongrit Boonsuk (Thai: นรงฤทธิ์ บุญสุข, born 4 June 1992) is a Thai professional footballer who plays as a centre back for Pattaya United in the Thai League 2.
