= Kasetsart University Kamphaeng Saen Campus Stadium =

- Interactive map of Kasetsart University Kamphaeng Saen Campus Stadium
- Location: Nakhon Pathom, Thailand
- Coordinates: 14°01′16″N 99°59′03″E
- Owner: Kasetsart University
- Operator: Kasetsart University
- Capacity: 4,000
- Surface: Grass

Construction
- Opened: N/A

Kasetsart University Kamphaeng Saen Campus Stadium (Thai: สนาม ม.เกษตรศาสตร์ วิทยาเขตกำแพงแสน) is a stadium in Nakhon Pathom, Thailand. It is currently used for football. The stadium holds 4,000 spectators.
