= Insee Chantarasatit Stadium =

Stadium in Chatuchak, Bangkok, Thailand

Insi Chantarasathit Stadium
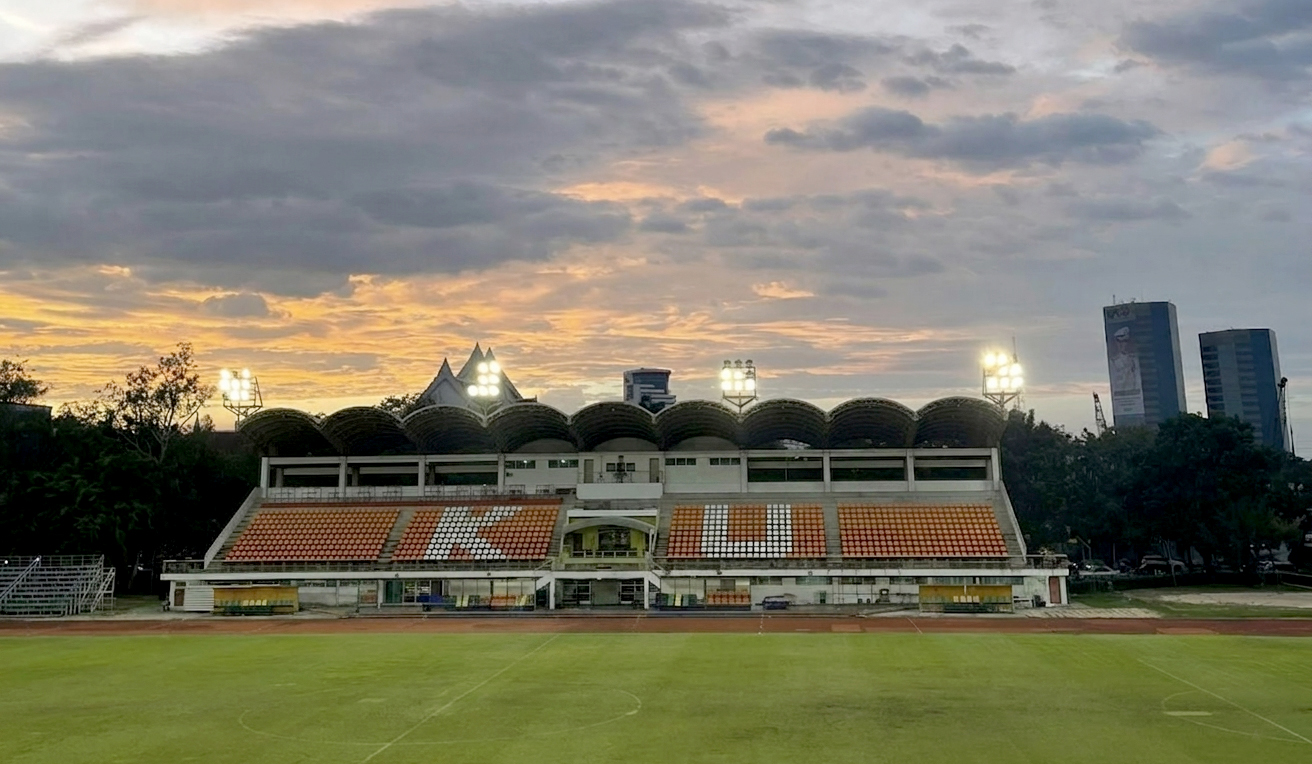
- Interactive map of Insi Chantarasathit Stadium
- Location: Chatuchak, Bangkok, Thailand
- Coordinates: 13°50′50″N 100°33′57″E
- Owner: Kasetsart University
- Operator: Kasetsart University
- Capacity: 3,275
- Surface: Grass
- Public transit: BTS Kasetsart University; SRT Bang Khen

Tenant
- Kasetsart F.C. 2009–2011, 2013, 2016, 2020–

Insi Chantarasathit Stadium (Thai: สนามอินทรีย์จันทรสถิตย์) is the main multi-purpose stadium of Kasetsart University, on the university's main campus in Chatuchak District, Bangkok, Thailand. It is one of several stadia used by Thai League 2 club Kasetsart. The stadium holds 4,000 people.
