= Provincial Electricity Authority =

Energy company in Thailand

Provincial Electricity Authority (PEA)
- Native name: การไฟฟ้าส่วนภูมิภาค
- Romanized name: Kan Faifa Suan Phumiphak
- Type: State enterprise
- Industry: Provincial electricity supply
- Predecessors: Provincial Electricity Division; Provincial Electricity Organisation
- Founded: 28 September 1960; 65 years ago in Bangkok, Thailand
- Headquarters: Bangkok, Thailand
- Area served: 74 Thai provinces
- Key people: Supachai Ek-Un (governor)
- Revenue: 499,315 million baht (2018)
- Net income: 20,616 million baht (2018)
- Total assets: 414,880 million baht (2018)
- Number of employees: 35,532 (2018)
- Parent: Ministry of Interior
- Website: Official website

The Provincial Electricity Authority (PEA) (Abrv: กฟภ. RTGS: kofopho; Thai: การไฟฟ้าส่วนภูมิภาค, RTGS: Kan Faifa Suan Phumiphak) is a Thai state enterprise under the Ministry of Interior. Established on 28 September 1960 by the Provincial Electricity Authority Act 1960 (BE 2503, it is currently headed by Chayabol Thitisak. PEA is responsible for providing electricity in 74 provinces in Thailand—all except Bangkok, Samut Prakan, and Nonthaburi)—which are served by the Metropolitan Electricity Authority.

== History ==
The first town electricity system installed outside Bangkok was in Nakhon Pathom City in 1930. In 1934, the Provincial Electricity Division was set up. After World War II, a royal decree replaced the division and formed the Provincial Electricity Organisation on 16 March 1954. The PEA was then established on 28 September 1960 by the Provincial Electricity Authority Act 1960. Following the Third National Social and Economic Development Plan (1972-1975), and significantly increased electricity demand, the PEA saw rapid expansion throughout the provinces of Thailand. All provinces, districts and subdistricts in Thailand became electrified after fiscal year 1989.

== Operations ==
PEA operates a total of 945 offices in the country, with its head office in Bangkok. Electricity provision is separated into four regions according to the geography of Thailand, with three subregions per region:

- North
  - Region 1 Chiang Mai (Chiang Mai, Mae Hong Son, Lamphun, Lampang, Chiang Rai and Phayao)
  - Region 2 Phitsanulok (Phitsanulok, Phichit, Tak, Kamphaeng Phet, Sukhothai, Phrae, Nan and Uttaradit)
  - Region 3 Lopburi (Lopburi, Sing Buri, Phetchabun, Nakhon Sawan, Uthai Thani and Chai Nat)
- Northeast
  - Region 1 Udon Thani (Udon Thani, Nong Khai, Khon Kaen, Loei, Sakon Nakhon, Nakhon Phanom, Nong Bua Lamphu and Bueng Kan)
  - Region 2 Ubon Ratchathani (Ubon Ratchathani, Yasothon, Roi Et, Kalasin, Maha Sarakham, Sisaket, Mukdahan and Amnat Charoen)
  - Region 3 Nakhon Ratchasima (Nakhon Ratchasima, Chaiyaphum, Buriram and Surin)
- Central
  - Region 1 Phra Nakhon Si Ayutthaya (Phra Nakhon Si Ayutthaya, Ang Thong, Pathum Thani, Saraburi, Nakhon Nayok, Prachinburi and Sa Kaeo)
  - Region 2 Chonburi (Chonburi, Chachoengsao, Rayong, Chanthaburi and Trat)
  - Region 3 Nakhon Pathom (Nakhon Pathom, Samut Sakhon, Suphan Buri and Kanchanaburi)
- South
  - Region 1 Phetchaburi (Phetchaburi, Prachuap Khiri Khan, Ratchaburi, Samut Songkhram, Chumphon and Ranong)
  - Region 2 Nakhon Si Thammarat (Nakhon Si Thammarat, Trang, Krabi, Surat Thani, Phuket and Phang Nga)
  - Region 3 Yala (Yala, Pattani, Narathiwat, Songkhla, Satun and Phatthalung)

Maximum energy demand was in 2016, peaking at 20,439 MW.

== Financials ==
In FY2018, PEA reported a net income of 20,616 million baht on revenues of 499,315 million baht. Its total assets were at 414,880 million baht. It currently employs 35,532 people. Maximum energy demand in 2018 was 19,139 MW. It was the fourth most profitable state enterprise in Thailand in 2014.

In Thailand's FY2021 budget, the PEA was allocated 523.9 million baht.

== See also ==
- Metropolitan Electricity Authority
- Provincial Waterworks Authority
- Ministry of Interior (Thailand)
