= Kasetsart F.C. =

Thai football club

Kasetsart เกษตรศาสตร์ เอฟซี
- Full name: Kasetsart Football Club สโมสรฟุตบอลมหาวิทยาลัยเกษตรศาสตร์
- Nicknames: The Emerald Naga (นาคามรกต); The Nine Lives Naga (นาคาเก้าชีวิต)
- Founded: 1988
- Ground: Insee Chantarasatit Stadium; Bangkok, Thailand
- Capacity: 3,275
- Owner: Kasetsart University
- Chairman: Vacant
- Head coach: Jadet Meelarp
- League: Thai League 2
- 2025–26: Thai League 2, 16th of 18 ▼
- Website: kasetsart-fc.com
Home colours	Away colours	Third colours

Kasetsart Football Club (Thai: สโมสรฟุตบอลมหาวิทยาลัยเกษตรศาสตร์) is a Thai professional football club under the stewardship of Kasetsart University based in Bangkok.

== History ==
Kasetsart won the Khǒr Royal Cup (ถ้วย ข.) in the 2008 season and gained promotion to the third level. They achieved a 7th-place finish in their first season in the 2009 Thai Division 2 League Bangkok & field Region league. The following season, the club finished 11th in the expanded 13-team 2010 Thai Division 2 League Bangkok & field Region.

In the 2010 Thai League Cup qualifying round, Kasetsart was penalized with a 2–0 loss after they walked off the pitch during the middle of a game with Nonthaburi The decision to walk off proved costly as a victory over their opponents would have set up a first-round tie with Bangkok Glass.

Big things were expected for the 2011 season with a vastly improved budget and several signings from the Thai Division 1 League. Kasetsart won the Bangkok Division 2 league title but their playoff campaign ended disastrously both on and off the field. The side finished bottom of Group A, collecting five points while their home stadium was unusable due to the 2011 Thai floods. Because of the damage caused to their stadium by the flooding, Kasetasrt had to relocate to their Kasetsart University Kamphaeng Saen Campus Stadium in Nakhon Pathom for the 2012 season. Yet again the season ended in disappointment as the Emerald Naga were pipped for a playoff spot on the last day of the season.

In 2024, Kasetsart decided to withdraw the team from the competition and dissolved the club after the end of season 2023–24 Thai League 2 due to the problem of lack of financial liquidity. But later on, the club announced that they would not disband the team and would send the team to continue competing in 2024–25 Thai League 2. For this reason, as well as them barely surviving relegation in the 2025-26 Thai League 2, they were given the nickname the Nine Lives Naga.

== Stadium and locations ==
Coordinates	Location	Stadium	Capacity	Year
14°01′16″N 99°59′03″E	Nakhon Pathom	Kasetsart University Kamphaeng Saen Campus Stadium	4,000	2007, 2012, 2014–2015
13°55′05″N 100°32′51″E	Lak Si, Bangkok	TOT Stadium Chaeng Watthana	5,000	2017–2019
13°50′50″N 100°33′57″E	Chatuchak, Bangkok	Insee Chantarasatit Stadium	3,275	2009–2011, 2013, 2016, 2020–

== Season by season record ==
Season	League									FA Cup	League Cup	Top goalscorer	
Season	Division	P	W	D	L	F	A	Pts	Pos	FA Cup	League Cup	Name	Goals
2008	Khǒr Royal Cup								1st				
2009	Bangkok	18	4	6	8	22	32	18	7th				
2010	Bangkok	24	4	5	15	20	39	17	11th				
2011	Bangkok	30	18	10	2	55	29	64	1st				
2012	Bangkok	34	19	8	7	58	32	65	4th				
2013	Bangkok	26	14	6	6	36	23	48	2nd				
2014	Request for Withdrawn												
2015	Bangkok	26	12	5	9	34	27	41	4th	R2	QR1		
2016	Bangkok	20	13	3	4	43	14	42	2nd	R1	R3		
2017	T2	32	8	13	11	61	72	37	13th	R1	QRP	(Brazil) Jonatan Ferreira Reis	28
2018	T2	28	8	4	16	34	49	28	13th	R2	R1	(New Zealand) Kayne Vincent	7
2019	T2	34	10	10	14	40	43	40	12th	Not Enter	R1	(South Korea) Seo Dong-hyeon	9
2020–21	T2	34	11	5	18	34	53	38	14th	Not Enter	Not Enter	(Thailand) Apiwit Samurmuen	7
2021–22	T2	34	9	12	13	32	47	39	13th	QR	R1	(France) Simon Dia	7
2022–23	T2	34	8	13	13	35	42	37	15th	R2	Not Enter	(Brazil) Mateus Totô	12
2023–24	T2	34	6	4	24	31	84	22	16th	R1	R1	(Saint Kitts and Nevis) Tishan Hanley	7
2024–25	T2	32	11	12	9	36	37	45	7th	QR	R1	(Thailand) Adisak Kraisorn	11
2025–26	T2	34	9	11	14	46	49	38	16th	R1	QRP		

Champions	Runners-up	Promoted	Relegated

- P = Played
- W = Games won
- D = Games drawn
- L = Games lost
- F = Goals for
- A = Goals against
- Pts = Points
- Pos = Final position
- QR1 = First Qualifying Round
- QR2 = Second Qualifying Round
- QRP = Qualification play-off
- R1 = Round 1
- R2 = Round 2
- R3 = Round 3
- R4 = Round 4
- R5 = Round 5
- R6 = Round 6
- QF = Quarter-finals
- SF = Semi-finals
- RU = Runners-up
- W = Winners

== Players ==
=== Current squad ===
Note: Flags indicate national team as defined under FIFA eligibility rules; some limited exceptions apply. Players may hold more than one non-FIFA nationality.

No.	Pos.	Nation	Player
1	GK	THA	Siwat Rawangpa
5	DF	THA	Teeradol Poonsawat
6	MF	THA	Jakkarin Kaewprom
7	FW	AUS	AJ Inia
8	MF	THA	Theerapat Kaewphung
10	MF	BRA	Bruno Dybal
11	MF	THA	Rungrath Poomchantuek
15	DF	THA	Nitipong Sanmahung
16	MF	THA	Sorawit Saetang
17	MF	THA	Kantaphat Nivasakul
18	MF	THA	Jessakorn Noysri

No.	Pos.	Nation	Player
19	FW	THA	Taninnat Athisaraworameth
22	DF	THA	Phasakon Songvechkasem
23	DF	THA	Adisak Sosungnoen
25	GK	THA	Nathaphat Wannamart
26	DF	THA	Supasak Sarapee
27	MF	THA	Teekanut Muttamara
28	FW	THA	Worachai Jaoprakam
30	MF	THA	Chonmapoom Chuppayakka
47	DF	THA	Arucha Duangdao
66	DF	THA	Chanakorn Kongsoubchat
76	GK	THA	Vorameth Yodsanit
77	DF	THA	Peravit Saetung

== Club management ==
=== Coaching staff ===
Position	Name
Head coach	(Thailand) Jadet Meelarp
Assistant Coach	(Thailand) Chusak Suwanna (Thailand) Songwut Buaphet (Thailand) Makha Horprasartsuk
Goalkeeper Coach	(Thailand) Pongpanot Naknayom
Fitness Coach	(Thailand) Natchanon Sangphuk (Thailand) Aniwat Rattana
Assistant Fitness Coach	(Thailand) Chinnaphak Sirisawat
Team Coaching Staff	(Thailand) Wimonmas Prachakul
Team Manager	(Thailand) Manote Suwanslip

== Honours ==
=== Domestic leagues ===
- Regional League Bangkok Area Division
  - Winners (1): 2011
  - Runners-up (2): 2013, 2016
- Khǒr Royal Cup
  - Winners: 2008
  - Third place: 2000
