= Pattaya United F.C. (2023) =

Thai football club

Pattaya United พัทยา ยูไนเต็ด
- Full name: Pattaya United Football Club สโมสรฟุตบอลพัทยา ยูไนเต็ด
- Nicknames: The Arrogant Dolphins (โลมาอหังการ)
- Founded: 2011; 15 years ago, as Isan Pattaya; 2019; 7 years ago, as Pattaya Discovery United; 2021; 5 years ago, as Pattaya Dolphins United; 2023; 3 years ago, as Pattaya United
- Ground: Nong Prue Stadium; Chonburi, Thailand
- Capacity: 5,838
- Chairman: Chokchai Tespan
- Head coach: Woradet Phuprapai
- League: Thai League 2
- 2025–26: Thai League 2, 12th of 18
- Website: https://www.facebook.com/pattayadolphinsunited2021/

Pattaya United Football Club (Thai: สโมสรฟุตบอลพัทยา ยูไนเต็ด), is a Thai football club based in Pattaya, Chonburi, Thailand. The club is currently playing in the Thai League 2.

== History ==
In 2021, the new owner, Chokchai Tespan decided to change the club's name from Pattaya Discovery United to Pattaya Dolphins United. The club's logo was also changed at this time. These changes were applied from the 2021–22 Thai League 3 season onwards. In 2022, Pattaya Dolphins United competed in the Thai League 3 for the 2022–23 season. It is their 5th season in the professional league. The club started the season with a 2–1 away win over Pluakdaeng United and they ended the season with a 2–0 home win over Pluakdaeng United. The club has finished 1st place in the league of the Eastern region and advanced to the national championship stage. In addition, in the 2022–23 Thai FA Cup Pattaya Dolphins United was defeated 1–3 by Udon United in the first round, causing them to be eliminated and in the 2022–23 Thai League Cup Pattaya Dolphins United was defeated 0–2 by Pluakdaeng United in the first qualification round, causing them to be eliminated too.

In 2023, Pattaya Dolphins United has renamed to Pattaya United, and changed its club's logo.

In 2024–25, Pattaya United were originally relegated but reprieve in second tier after Lampang FC dissolve.

== Record ==
Season	League									FA Cup	League Cup	Top goalscorer	
Season	Division	P	W	D	L	F	A	Pts	Pos	FA Cup	League Cup	Name	Goals
2016	DIV 3 East	2	4	1	0	20	4	13	3rd	Opted out	Ineligible		
2017	TA East	7	5	2	0	22	9	17	1st	R1	Ineligible	(Thailand) Thawatchai Yokyos (Thailand) Siripong Meesiri (Thailand) Kritsada Sansud	5
2018	T4 East	27	9	8	10	31	36	35	6th	Opted out	Opted out	(Thailand) Treepect Kruearanya	7
2019	T4 East	28	15	6	7	52	31	51	3rd	Opted out	Opted out	(Thailand) Narathip Kruearanya	17
2020–21	T3 East	16	4	5	7	21	34	17	8th	QR	Opted out	(Thailand) Pipat Thonkanya	6
2021–22	T3 East	22	16	5	1	62	14	53	1st	R2	QR2	(Brazil) Pedro Augusto Silva Rodrigues	24
2022–23	T3 East	22	16	2	4	32	18	50	1st	R1	QR1	(Brazil) Danilo	13
2023–24	T2	34	15	10	9	45	36	55	7th	R1	R1	(Brazil) Judivan	14
2024–25	T2	32	8	8	16	32	47	32	16th	R1	QPR	(Brazil) Felipe Veloso	8
2025–26	T2	34	10	12	12	45	42	42	12th	QR	R1	(Brazil) Gregory da Silva	11

Champions	Runners-up	Promoted	Relegated

== Players ==
=== Current squad ===
As of 1 August 2025

Note: Flags indicate national team as defined under FIFA eligibility rules; some limited exceptions apply. Players may hold more than one non-FIFA nationality.

No.	Pos.	Nation	Player
1	GK	THA	Varuth Wongsomsak
4	DF	THA	Pharanyu Uppala
5	DF	BRA	Evson Patrício
6	MF	THA	Yotsakorn Natthasit (on loan from Chonburi)
7	MF	THA	Karn Jorates (on loan from Kasetsart)
8	MF	THA	Thanapong Boontab
10	MF	GER	Meritan Shabani
11	MF	THA	Rattapong Promla
14	DF	THA	Krithawut Sodachan
15	DF	THA	Noppanon Kachaplayuk (on loan from Mahasarakham CC)
16	DF	THA	Peerawit Saetung
17	DF	THA	Gorawit Wongkrai
19	GK	THA	Thitikit Samerjai
20	MF	THA	Jirapong Pungviravong
22	MF	THA	Thammayut Rakbun
23	MF	THA	Somkid Chamnarnsilp
24	FW	THA	Jonah Duchowny
27	MF	THA	Navapan Thianchai
31	GK	THA	Nattakitt Kanapornthawornpat
34	DF	THA	Narongrit Boonsuk
36	DF	THA	Taned Benyapad

No.	Pos.	Nation	Player
39	DF	THA	Supravee Miprathang
51	MF	THA	Anuwat Sripralad
53	DF	THA	Yutiwich Suman
54	MF	THA	Oatasawin Issaro
55	FW	THA	Athakul Ounprasert
56	MF	THA	Sorayutth Sonkumharn
57	MF	THA	Saksatein Jumas
64	DF	THA	Suttupai Oakkhanarat
66	DF	THA	Thanathon Sritharathikhun
69	MF	THA	Pattanaporn Promdaen
70	FW	BRA	Tiago Chulapa
71	DF	THA	Kwantham Thongtavee
72	DF	THA	Pitipat butlak
73	DF	THA	Ravipas Reangsita
74	GK	THA	Konrakit Ropkhaeon
75	MF	THA	Pongwit Rithong
76	FW	THA	Jetsada Seriphunphat
77	FW	BRA	André Luís
85	DF	THA	Peerapat Inwow

== Club staff ==
Position	Name
President	(Thailand) Chokchai Tespan
Vice President	(Thailand) Nipid Katepongpat (Thailand) Jirawan Guntang
Team manager	(Thailand) Jakkapun Kaewsangthong
Head coach	(Thailand) Woradet Phuprapai
Assistant coach	(Thailand) Arthit Onkham (Thailand) Donlaya Daoreaung (Thailand) Surachart Sing-Ngon
Goalkeeper coach	(Thailand) Somkiat Passajantr
Assistant goalkeeper coach	(Thailand) Sittichai Konyanee
Fitness coach	(Thailand) Kiadtisak Kongsanit (Thailand) Chatwat Boontrai
Club doctor	(Thailand) Dr. Thanit Junthien
Kit Man	(Thailand) Chonlatee Phungkhoksung (Thailand) Nachapat Weeracupt
Media Officer	(Thailand) Chattawat Ittiwat-Opass

== Honours ==
=== League ===
- Thai League 3 (Eastern Region)
  - Champions (2): 2021–22, 2022–23
