= 2021–22 Thai League 3 National Championship =

Thai League 3 National Championship
- Season: 2021–22
- Dates: 8 March 2022 – 24 April 2022

The National Championship was the next stage from the regional stage of 2021–22 Thai League 3. The winners and runners-ups of each region would qualify for this round to find 3 clubs promoting to 2022–23 Thai League 2.

== Teams ==
Locations of the 2021–22 Thai League 3 National Championship Teams
Upper Region
Lower Region

Team	Qualifying method
Uthai Thani	Northern region champions
Phitsanulok	Northern region runners-up
Muang Loei United	Northeastern region champions
Sisaket	Northeastern region runners-up
Pattaya Dolphins United	Eastern region champions
Chachoengsao Hi-Tek	Eastern region runners-up
Saraburi United	Western region champions
Pathumthani University	Western region runners-up
Krabi	Southern region champions
Nakhon Si United	Southern region runners-up
North Bangkok University	Bangkok Metropolitan region champions
Bangkok	Bangkok Metropolitan region runners-up

Locations of teams in Bangkok Metropolitan region

== Group stage ==
=== Upper region ===
Pos	Team	Pld	W	D	L	GF	GA	GD	Pts	Qualification	UTT	PLK	PAT	MLU	SKT	CCH
1	Uthai Thani (C, P)	5	4	0	1	14	6	+8	12 (Note: The head-to-head points record (mini-league); Uthai Thani 3 pts (GD +1), Phitsanulok 3 pts (GD 0), Pattaya Dolphins United 3 pts (GD -1).)	Qualification to the final and promotion to the 2022–23 Thai League 2	—	—	4–1	—	6–2	3–1
2	Phitsanulok	5	4	0	1	9	4	+5	12	Qualification to the third place play-off	2–0	—	—	—	—	3–1
3	Pattaya Dolphins United	5	4	0	1	11	8	+3	12		—	2–0	—	2–1	4–3	—
4	Muang Loei United	5	1	0	4	5	7	−2	3 (Note: The head-to-head points record (mini-league); Muang Loei United 3 pts (GD +1), Sisaket 3 pts (GD 0), Chachoengsao Hi-Tek 3 pts (GD -1).)		0–1	0–1	—	—	2–0	—
5	Sisaket	5	1	0	4	8	15	−7	3		—	1–3	—	—	—	2–0
6	Chachoengsao Hi-Tek	5	1	0	4	5	12	−7	3		—	—	0–2	3–2	—	—

Source: Thai League
Rules for classification: 1) Points; 2) Head-to-head points; 3) Goal difference; 4) Goals scored;).
(C) Champions; (P) Promoted
Notes:
8 March 2022
18:30 UTC+7

Uthai Thani	4–1	Pattaya Dolphins United
Ricardo Santos 33', 40', 82' (pen.); Chigozie Mbah 90'	Report; Highlight	Emerson Brito dos Santos 90+3'

Uthai Thani Provincial Stadium,
Mueang, Uthai Thani
Attendance: 1,048
Referee: Kristin Saisombat (Thailand)
12 March 2022
15:30 UTC+7

Muang Loei United	0–1	Phitsanulok
	Report; Highlight	João Paulo 88' (pen.)

Blue Dragon Mueang Loei Stadium,
Mueang, Loei
Attendance: 450
Referee: Somkhid Sarapim (Thailand)
12 March 2022
17:00 UTC+7

Sisaket	2–0	Chachoengsao Hi-Tek
Nittipat Kansorn 40'; Seksit Srisai 44'	Report; Highlight

Sri Nakhon Lamduan Stadium,
Mueang, Sisaket
Attendance: 1,025
Referee: Suttipong Tepa (Thailand)

20 March 2022
15:30 UTC+7

Muang Loei United	2–0	Sisaket
Matheus Souza Silva 19'; Patchara Nantasri 27'	Report; Highlight

Blue Dragon Mueang Loei Stadium,
Mueang, Loei
Attendance: 326
Referee: Prakasit Chantarasawang (Thailand)
20 March 2022
16:00 UTC+7

Pattaya Dolphins United	2–0	Phitsanulok
Suksan Bunta 59'; Pedro Augusto Silva Rodrigues 76'	Report; Highlight

Nong Prue Stadium,
Bang Lamung, Chonburi
Attendance: 830
Referee: Satchukorn Saenchu (Thailand)
20 March 2022
18:00 UTC+7

Uthai Thani	3–1	Chachoengsao Hi-Tek
Chigozie Mbah 20'; Ricardo Santos 29'; Phattharaphon Junsuwan 84'	Report; Highlight	Caio da Conceição Silva 46'

Uthai Thani Provincial Stadium,
Mueang, Uthai Thani
Attendance: 642
Referee: Piyapong Thongkhain (Thailand)

26 March 2022
15:30 UTC+7

Chachoengsao Hi-Tek	3–2	Muang Loei United
Patiroop Sunjonlord 44'; Phakhawat Seekhieo 47'; Caio da Conceição Silva 90+3'	Report; Highlight	Matheus Souza Silva 40'; Patchara Nantasri 62'

Chang Football Park Stadium,
Banbueng, Chonburi
Attendance: 250
Referee: Pawara Seejen (Thailand)
26 March 2022
16:00 UTC+7

Pattaya Dolphins United	4–3	Sisaket
Suksan Bunta 14', 37'; Teerapong Deehamhae 55'; Pedro Augusto Silva Rodrigues 90+5'	Report; Highlight	Seksit Srisai 49'; Piyanath Chanram 66'; Gan Kleabphueng 79'

Nong Prue Stadium,
Bang Lamung, Chonburi
Attendance: 1,100
Referee: Wichate Tainthong (Thailand)
26 March 2022
17:00 UTC+7

Phitsanulok	2–0	Uthai Thani
Apiwat Chuenban 40'; André Luís 70'	Report; Highlight

Phitsanulok PAO. Stadium,
Mueang, Phitsanulok
Attendance: 800
Referee: Boonsong Prachumrak (Thailand)

3 April 2022
15:30 UTC+7

Muang Loei United	0–1	Uthai Thani
	Report; Highlight	Júnior Lopes 63'

Blue Dragon Mueang Loei Stadium,
Mueang, Loei
Attendance: 518
Referee: Thapakorn Thongkon (Thailand)
3 April 2022
17:00 UTC+7

Sisaket	1–3	Phitsanulok
Kazuki Murakami 45+1'	Report; Highlight	Gilberto Macena 3'; Apiwat Chuenban 22'; Naphat Thamrongsupakorn 51'

Sri Nakhon Lamduan Stadium,
Mueang, Sisaket
Attendance: 885
Referee: Chaiya Moolmanee (Thailand)
3 April 2022
18:00 UTC+7

Chachoengsao Hi-Tek	0–2	Pattaya Dolphins United
	Report; Highlight	Nitipong Sanmahung 5'; Pedro Augusto Silva Rodrigues 84'

Chachoengsao Municipality Stadium,
Mueang, Chachoengsao
Attendance: 0
Referee: Ekkachai Phetcham (Thailand)

9 April 2022
15:30 UTC+7

Uthai Thani	6–2	Sisaket
Ricardo Santos 36', 42' (pen.), 44', 47'; Mongkol Tossakrai 58' (pen.); Nontapat Naksawat 89'	Report; Highlight	Prapawit Jaroentat 35' (o.g.); Célio Guilherme da Silva Santos 87'

Uthai Thani Provincial Stadium,
Mueang, Uthai Thani
Attendance: 1,764
Referee: Putthipong Issising (Thailand)
9 April 2022
15:30 UTC+7

Pattaya Dolphins United	2–1	Muang Loei United
Pedro Augusto Silva Rodrigues 22'; Suksan Bunta 65'	Report; Highlight	Partchya Katethip 5'

Nong Prue Stadium,
Bang Lamung, Chonburi
Attendance: 1,091
Referee: Tawatchai Ngampod (Thailand)
9 April 2022
15:30 UTC+7

Phitsanulok	3–1	Chachoengsao Hi-Tek
Naphat Thamrongsupakorn 54'; João Paulo 73'; Gilberto Macena 78'	Report; Highlight	Caio da Conceição Silva 37'

Phitsanulok PAO. Stadium,
Mueang, Phitsanulok
Attendance: 1,120
Referee: Wicharn Klinthaworn (Thailand)

=== Lower region ===
Pos	Team	Pld	W	D	L	GF	GA	GD	Pts	Qualification	KBI	NSU	NBU	SRU	PTU	BKK
1	Krabi (P)	5	3	1	1	8	6	+2	10	Qualification to the final and promotion to the 2022–23 Thai League 2	—	0–0	2–1	—	—	1–2
2	Nakhon Si United (O, P)	5	2	3	0	9	2	+7	9	Qualification to the third place play-off	—	—	—	—	3–0	5–1
3	North Bangkok University	5	2	2	1	5	2	+3	8 (Note: The head-to-head record was a tie, North Bangkok University ahead on overall goals difference.)		—	0–0	—	0–0	—	3–0
4	Saraburi United	5	2	2	1	6	5	+1	8		2–3	1–1	—	—	2–1	—
5	Pathumthani University	5	1	0	4	6	8	−2	3 (Note: Pathumthani University ahead on head-to-head points record; Pathumthani University 3 pts, Bangkok 0 pts.)		1–2	—	0–1	—	—	—
6	Bangkok	5	1	0	4	3	14	−11	3		—	—	—	0–1	0–4	—

Source: Thai League
Rules for classification: 1) Points; 2) Head-to-head points; 3) Goal difference; 4) Goals scored;).
(O) Play-off winners; (P) Promoted
Notes:
13 March 2022
15:30 UTC+7

North Bangkok University	3–0	Bangkok
Sakda Koomgun 31' (o.g.); Kritsana Chitchuea 59'; Tanat Wongsupaluk 82'	Report; Highlight

Stadium of North Bangkok University,
Thanyaburi, Pathum Thani
Attendance: 300
Referee: Wichate Tainthong (Thailand)
13 March 2022
16:00 UTC+7

Nakhon Si United	3–0	Pathumthani University
Kittiphong Khetpara 19'; Wanit Chaisan 46'; Siwarut Pholhirun 90+3'	Report; Highlight

Nakhon Si Thammarat Provincial Stadium,
Mueang, Nakhon Si Thammarat
Attendance: 1,000
Referee: Pongthep Raipimai (Thailand)
13 March 2022
18:00 UTC+7

Saraburi United	2–3	Krabi
Danuson Wijitpunya 55', 61'	Report; Highlight	Akarat Punkaew 19' (pen.); Romário Alves 45+1'; Alexandre Balotelli 69'

Saraburi PAO. Stadium,
Mueang, Saraburi
Attendance: 808
Referee: Krisda Luangyos (Thailand)

19 March 2022
15:30 UTC+7

North Bangkok University	0–0	Nakhon Si United
	Report; Highlight

Stadium of North Bangkok University,
Thanyaburi, Pathum Thani
Attendance: 3,520
Referee: Thapakorn Thongkon (Thailand)
19 March 2022
15:30 UTC+7

Krabi	1–2	Bangkok
Alexandre Balotelli 68'	Report; Highlight	Caíque Freitas Ribeiro 32'; Sakda Koomgun 34'

Krabi Provincial Stadium,
Mueang, Krabi
Attendance: 280
Referee: Wicharn Klinthaworn (Thailand)
19 March 2022
17:30 UTC+7

Saraburi United	2–1	Pathumthani University
Danuson Wijitpunya 27', 48'	Report; Highlight	Giuberty Silva Neves 90+3' (pen.)

Saraburi PAO. Stadium,
Mueang, Saraburi
Attendance: 607
Referee: Seksan Phansri (Thailand)

27 March 2022
15:30 UTC+7

Krabi	0–0	Nakhon Si United
	Report; Highlight

Krabi Provincial Stadium,
Mueang, Krabi
Attendance: 450
Referee: Peeratat Kittikanmetee (Thailand)
27 March 2022
15:30 UTC+7

Pathumthani University	0–1	North Bangkok University
	Report; Highlight	Kritsana Chitchuea 2'

Ratchakram Stadium,
Bang Sai, Ayutthaya
Attendance: 420
Referee: Peerasan Krataithong (Thailand)
27 March 2022
15:30 UTC+7

Bangkok	0–1	Saraburi United
	Report; Highlight	Douglas Tardin 23'

72nd Anniversary Stadium, Bang Mot,
Thung Khru, Bangkok
Attendance: 500
Referee: U-sen Yala (Thailand)

2 April 2022
15:30 UTC+7

North Bangkok University	0–0	Saraburi United
	Report; Highlight

Stadium of North Bangkok University,
Thanyaburi, Pathum Thani
Attendance: 200
Referee: Kristin Saisombat (Thailand)
2 April 2022
15:30 UTC+7

Pathumthani University	1–2	Krabi
Rachata Jannongsuang 20'	Report; Highlight	Techin Mooktarakosa 3'; Alexandre Balotelli 55'

Ratchakram Stadium,
Bang Sai, Ayutthaya
Attendance: 100
Referee: Putthipong Issising (Thailand)
2 April 2022
16:00 UTC+7

Nakhon Si United	5–1	Bangkok
Naruephon Proomimas 6'; Phillerson Natan Silva de Oliveira 14'; Wanit Chaisan 45+2'; Erivelto 64', 90'	Report; Highlight	Somsak Musikaphan 82'

Nakhon Si Thammarat Provincial Stadium,
Mueang, Nakhon Si Thammarat
Attendance: 750
Referee: Woottipong Ketkam (Thailand)

10 April 2022
15:30 UTC+7

Krabi	2–1	North Bangkok University
Romário Alves 90+5' (pen.); Alexandre Balotelli 90+6'	Report; Highlight	Saranyu Mangsa 32'

Krabi Provincial Stadium,
Mueang, Krabi
Attendance: 700
Referee: Wittaya Junejan (Thailand)
10 April 2022
15:30 UTC+7

Saraburi United	1–1	Nakhon Si United
Douglas Tardin 47'	Report; Highlight	Wanit Chaisan 14'

Saraburi PAO. Stadium,
Mueang, Saraburi
Attendance: 1,053
Referee: Somkhid Sarapim (Thailand)
10 April 2022
15:30 UTC+7

Bangkok	0–4	Pathumthani University
	Report; Highlight	Bundit Paponpai 53', 90+3'; Giuberty Silva Neves 57' (pen.), 69'

72nd Anniversary Stadium, Bang Mot,
Thung Khru, Bangkok
Attendance: 150
Referee: Suriyo Kanhachalee (Thailand)

== Knockout stage ==
Winners, runners-up, and third place of 2021–22 Thai League 3 would be promoted to the 2022–23 Thai League 2.

=== Third place play-off ===
==== Summary ====
Team 1	Agg.	Team 2	1st leg	2nd leg
Phitsanulok	3–4	Nakhon Si United	1–1	2–3

==== Matches ====
16 April 2022
17:00 UTC+7

Phitsanulok	1–1	Nakhon Si United
André Luís 4'	Report; Highlight	Erivelto 16'

Phitsanulok PAO. Stadium,
Mueang, Phitsanulok
Attendance: 998
Referee: Kotchapoom Meesridaecha (Thailand)
23 April 2022
16:00 UTC+7

Nakhon Si United	3–2	Phitsanulok
Nattapoom Maya 41'; Phillerson Natan Silva de Oliveira 45'; Erivelto 90+4' (pen.)	Report; Highlight	Surachai Chawna 32'; André Luís 72'

Nakhon Si Thammarat Provincial Stadium,
Mueang, Nakhon Si Thammarat
Attendance: 2,250
Referee: Chaireag Ngam-som (Thailand)

Nakhon Si United won 4–3 on aggregate.

=== Final ===
==== Summary ====
Team 1	Agg.	Team 2	1st leg	2nd leg
Uthai Thani	3–1	Krabi	2–0	1–1

==== Matches ====
===== 1st leg =====
17 April 2022
17:00 UTC+7

Uthai Thani	2–0	Krabi
Ricardo Santos 30', 74' (pen.)	Report; Highlight

Uthai Thani Provincial Stadium,
Mueang, Uthai Thani
Attendance: 924
Referee: Songkran Bunmeekiart (Thailand)

Uthai Thani	Krabi

Lineups:
GK	37	(Thailand) Worawut Sukhuna
CB	33	(Brazil) Júnior Lopes		(yellow card) 63'
CB	19	(Thailand) Wattana Playnum
CB	43	(Thailand) Wanchat Choosong			(substituted off) 73'
RM	91	(Thailand) Phongsakon Trisat
CM	8	(Thailand) Narong Jansawek (c)
CM	6	(Thailand) Watcharakorn Manoworn		(yellow card) 57' (yellow-red card) 83'
LM	95	(Thailand) Nattapong Chaidee
RF	20	(Thailand) Chitpanya Tisud			(substituted off) 64'
CF	11	(Brazil) Ricardo Santos	30', 74' (pen.)
LF	99	(Nigeria) Chigozie Mbah			(substituted off) 88'
Substitutes:
GK	18	(Thailand) Boonyakait Wongsajaem
DF	3	(Thailand) Supoj Wonghoi
DF	17	(Thailand) Jakree Pankam			(substituted in) 73'
MF	4	(Thailand) Peemwit Thongnitiroj
MF	7	(Thailand) Datsakorn Thonglao
MF	10	(Thailand) Phattharaphon Junsuwan			(substituted in) 64'
MF	47	(Thailand) Kasidit Kalasin			(substituted in) 88'
FW	9	(Thailand) Kirati Keawsombat
FW	26	(Thailand) Nontapat Naksawat
Head Coach:
(Thailand) Therdsak Chaiman

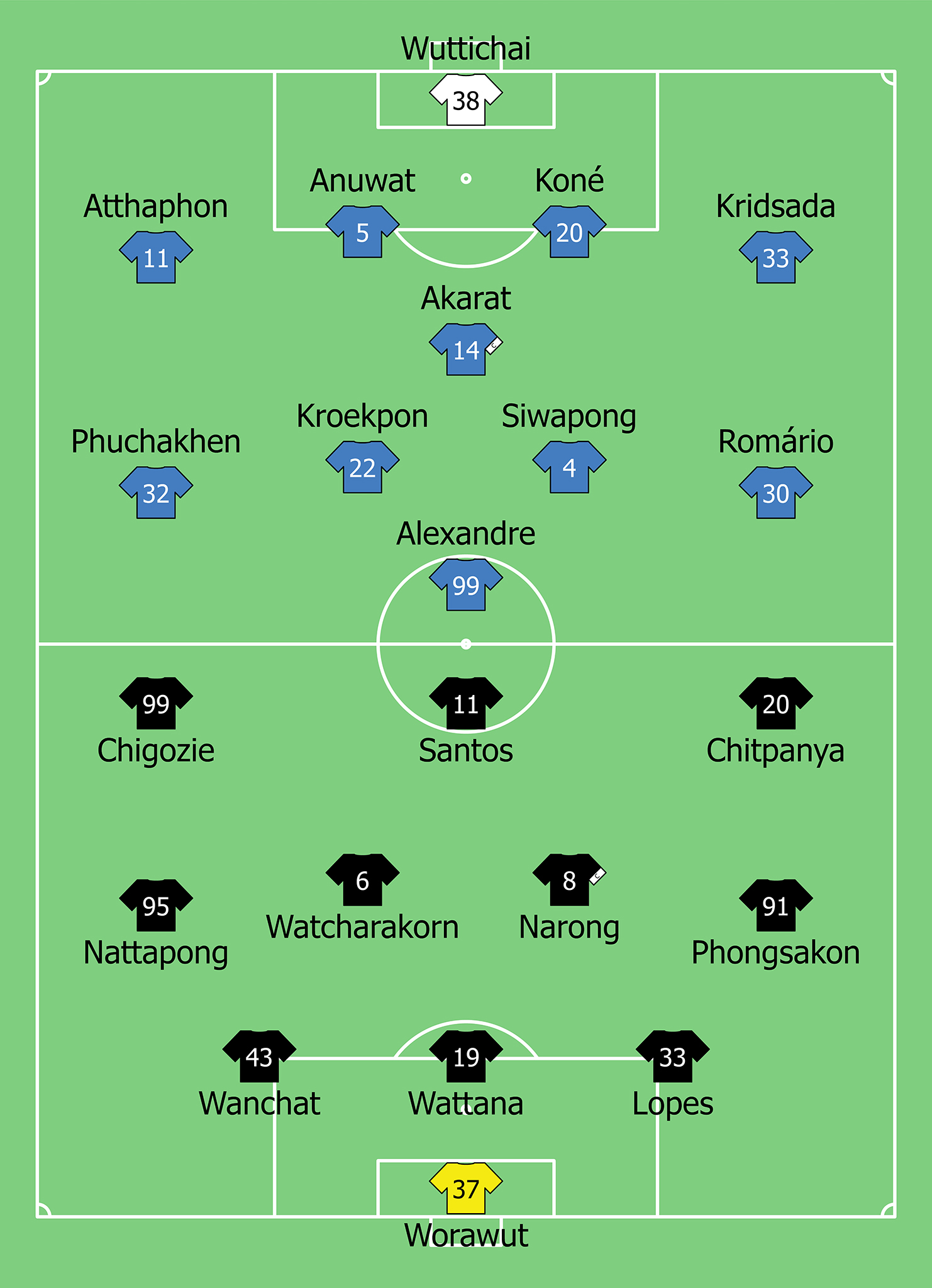

Lineups:
GK	38	(Thailand) Wuttichai Panboot
RB	11	(Thailand) Atthaphon Chongrak	(yellow card) 14'	(substituted off) 46'
CB	5	(Thailand) Anuwat Yungyuen
CB	20	(Ivory Coast) Seydou Koné
LB	33	(Thailand) Kridsada Limseeput
DM	14	(Thailand) Akarat Punkaew (c)
RM	32	(Thailand) Phuchakhen Chandaeng
CM	22	(Thailand) Kroekpon Kaewmuean		(substituted off) 74'
CM	4	(Thailand) Siwapong Jarernsin
LM	30	(Brazil) Romário Reginaldo Alves		(substituted off) 86'
CF	99	(Brazil) Alexandre Balotelli	(yellow card) 45'
Substitutes:
GK	81	(Thailand) Chaiyapat Honbanleng
DF	3	(Thailand) Suchart Chayyai
DF	18	(Thailand) Natthanon Charoensingkeewan		(substituted in) 86'
DF	39	(Thailand) Khunnaphon Udomsin
MF	6	(Thailand) Techin Mooktarakosa		(substituted in) 74'
MF	8	(Thailand) Rattasart Makasoot		(substituted in) 46'
MF	37	(Thailand) Kongpop Artserm
FW	9	(Thailand) Surin Ra-ob
FW	10	(Thailand) Arnon Petwat
Head Coach:
(Thailand) Prajak Weangsong

===== 2nd leg =====
24 April 2022
15:30 UTC+7

Krabi	1–1	Uthai Thani
Phuchakhen Chandaeng 5'	Report; Highlight; Ceremony	Ricardo Santos 3'

Krabi Provincial Stadium,
Mueang, Krabi
Attendance: 1,300
Referee: Ekkachai Phetcham (Thailand)

Krabi	Uthai Thani

Lineups:
GK	38	(Thailand) Wuttichai Panboot
RB	11	(Thailand) Atthaphon Chongrak			(substituted off) 46'
CB	5	(Thailand) Anuwat Yungyuen
CB	20	(Ivory Coast) Seydou Koné		(yellow card) 10'
LB	33	(Thailand) Kridsada Limseeput			(substituted off) 85'
DM	14	(Thailand) Akarat Punkaew (c)
CM	4	(Thailand) Siwapong Jarernsin			(substituted off) 75'
CM	6	(Thailand) Techin Mooktarakosa			(substituted off) 64'
RF	32	(Thailand) Phuchakhen Chandaeng	5'
CF	99	(Brazil) Alexandre Balotelli
LF	30	(Brazil) Romário Reginaldo Alves			(substituted off) 75'
Substitutes:
GK	81	(Thailand) Chaiyapat Honbanleng
DF	7	(Thailand) Aitipol Kaewkeaw
DF	39	(Thailand) Khunnaphon Udomsin
MF	8	(Thailand) Rattasart Makasoot			(substituted in) 46'
MF	22	(Thailand) Kroekpon Kaewmuean		(yellow card) 89'	(substituted in) 64'
MF	26	(Thailand) Kritsanapol Booncharee			(substituted in) 75'
MF	37	(Thailand) Kongpop Artserm
FW	10	(Thailand) Arnon Petwat			(substituted in) 85'
FW	59	(Thailand) Chudit Wanpraphao			(substituted in) 75'
Head Coach:
(Thailand) Prajak Weangsong

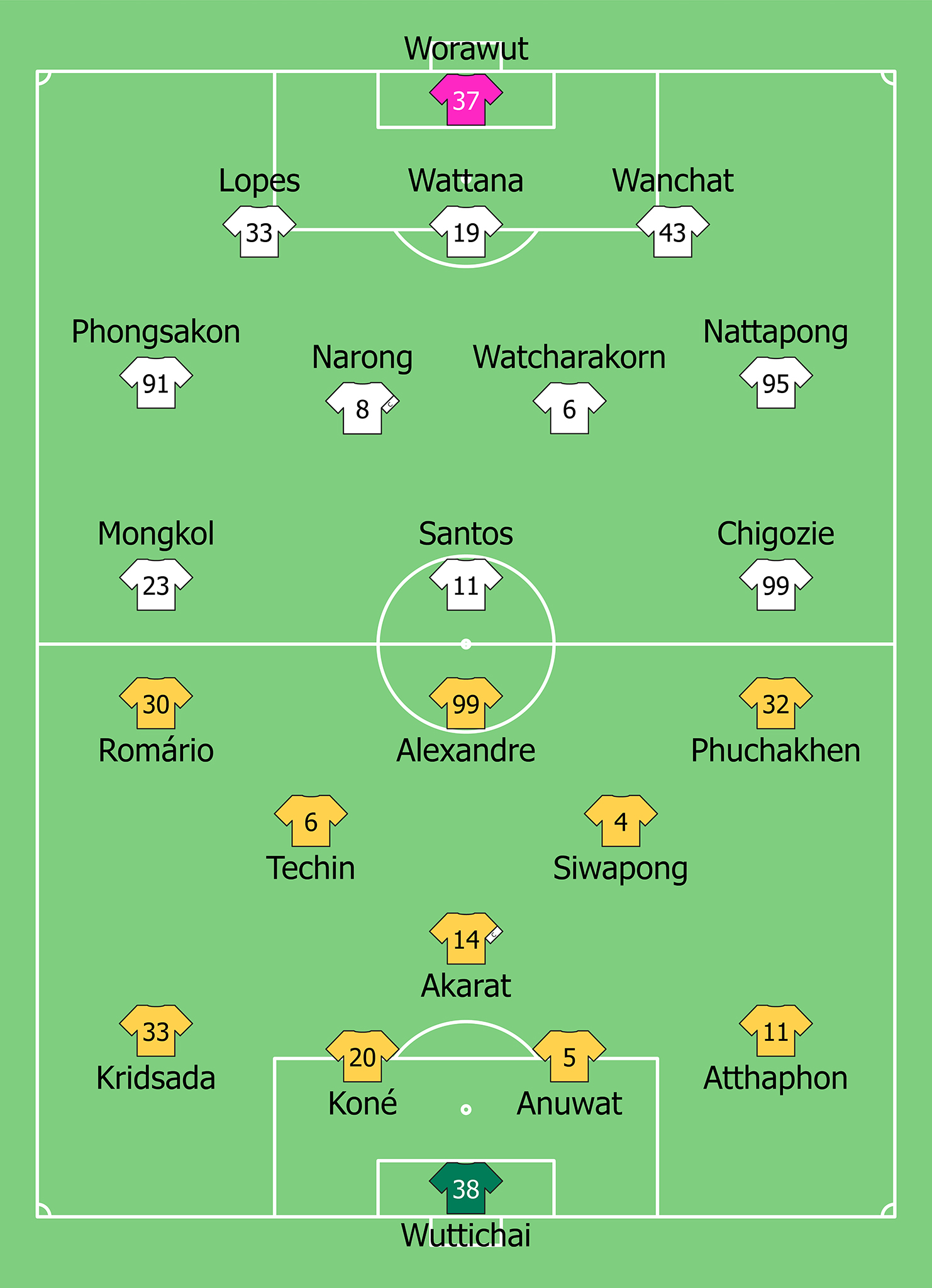

Lineups:
GK	37	(Thailand) Worawut Sukhuna
CB	33	(Brazil) Júnior Lopes		(yellow card) 37'
CB	19	(Thailand) Wattana Playnum		(yellow card) 65'
CB	43	(Thailand) Wanchat Choosong		(yellow card) 86'
RM	91	(Thailand) Phongsakon Trisat
CM	8	(Thailand) Narong Jansawek (c)			(substituted off) 90+2'
CM	6	(Thailand) Watcharakorn Manoworn
LM	95	(Thailand) Nattapong Chaidee
RF	23	(Thailand) Mongkol Tossakrai			(substituted off) 87'
CF	11	(Brazil) Ricardo Santos	3'
LF	99	(Nigeria) Chigozie Mbah			(substituted off) 90+2'
Substitutes:
GK	18	(Thailand) Boonyakait Wongsajaem
DF	3	(Thailand) Supoj Wonghoi
DF	17	(Thailand) Jakree Pankam
MF	4	(Thailand) Peemwit Thongnitiroj
MF	7	(Thailand) Datsakorn Thonglao			(substituted in) 90+2'
MF	10	(Thailand) Phattharaphon Junsuwan			(substituted in) 90+2'
MF	20	(Thailand) Chitpanya Tisud
MF	47	(Thailand) Kasidit Kalasin
FW	26	(Thailand) Nontapat Naksawat			(substituted in) 87'
Head Coach:
(Thailand) Therdsak Chaiman

Uthai Thani won 3–1 on aggregate.

== Statistics ==
=== Goalscorers ===
There were 100 goals scored in 34 matches, for an average of 2.94 goals per match.

11 goals

- (Brazil) Ricardo Santos (Uthai Thani)

4 goals

- (Brazil) Alexandre Balotelli (Krabi)
- (Brazil) Erivelto (Nakhon Si United)
- (Brazil) Pedro Augusto Silva Rodrigues (Pattaya Dolphins United)
- (Thailand) Suksan Bunta (Pattaya Dolphins United)
- (Thailand) Danuson Wijitpunya (Saraburi United)

3 goals

- (Brazil) Caio da Conceição Silva (Chachoengsao Hi-Tek)
- (Thailand) Wanit Chaisan (Nakhon Si United)
- (Brazil) Giuberty Silva Neves (Pathumthani University)
- (Brazil) André Luís (Phitsanulok)

2 goals

- (Brazil) Romário Alves (Krabi)
- (Brazil) Matheus Souza Silva (Muang Loei United)
- (Thailand) Patchara Nantasri (Muang Loei United)
- (Brazil) Phillerson Natan Silva de Oliveira (Nakhon Si United)
- (Thailand) Kritsana Chitchuea (North Bangkok University)
- (Thailand) Bundit Paponpai (Pathumthani University)
- (Thailand) Apiwat Chuenban (Phitsanulok)
- (Brazil) Gilberto Macena (Phitsanulok)
- (Brazil) João Paulo (Phitsanulok)
- (Thailand) Naphat Thamrongsupakorn (Phitsanulok)
- (Brazil) Douglas Tardin (Saraburi United)
- (Thailand) Seksit Srisai (Sisaket)
- (Nigeria) Chigozie Mbah (Uthai Thani)

1 goal

- (Brazil) Caíque Freitas Ribeiro (Bangkok)
- (Thailand) Sakda Koomgun (Bangkok)
- (Thailand) Somsak Musikaphan (Bangkok)
- (Thailand) Patiroop Sunjonlord (Chachoengsao Hi-Tek)
- (Thailand) Phakhawat Seekhieo (Chachoengsao Hi-Tek)
- (Thailand) Akarat Punkaew (Krabi)
- (Thailand) Phuchakhen Chandaeng (Krabi)
- (Thailand) Techin Mooktarakosa (Krabi)
- (Thailand) Partchya Katethip (Muang Loei United)
- (Thailand) Kittiphong Khetpara (Nakhon Si United)
- (Thailand) Naruephon Proomimas (Nakhon Si United)
- (Thailand) Nattapoom Maya (Nakhon Si United)
- (Thailand) Siwarut Pholhirun (Nakhon Si United)
- (Thailand) Saranyu Mangsa (North Bangkok University)
- (Thailand) Tanat Wongsupaluk (North Bangkok University)
- (Thailand) Rachata Jannongsuang (Pathumthani University)
- (Brazil) Emerson Brito dos Santos (Pattaya Dolphins United)
- (Thailand) Nitipong Sanmahung (Pattaya Dolphins United)
- (Thailand) Teerapong Deehamhae (Pattaya Dolphins United)
- (Thailand) Surachai Chawna (Phitsanulok)
- (Brazil) Célio Guilherme da Silva Santos (Sisaket)
- (Thailand) Gan Kleabphueng (Sisaket)
- (Japan) Kazuki Murakami (Sisaket)
- (Thailand) Nittipat Kansorn (Sisaket)
- (Thailand) Piyanath Chanram (Sisaket)
- (Brazil) Júnior Lopes (Uthai Thani)
- (Thailand) Mongkol Tossakrai (Uthai Thani)
- (Thailand) Nontapat Naksawat (Uthai Thani)
- (Thailand) Phattharaphon Junsuwan (Uthai Thani)

1 own goal

- (Thailand) Sakda Koomgun (Bangkok against North Bangkok University)
- (Thailand) Prapawit Jaroentat (Uthai Thani against Sisaket)

Source: Thai League

== Teams promoted to 2022–23 Thai League 2 ==
- Uthai Thani (champions)
- Krabi (runners-up)
- Nakhon Si United (third-placed)
