= 2021–22 Thai League 3 Northeastern Region =

Thai League 3 Northeastern Region
- Season: 2021–22
- Dates: 4 September 2021 – 26 February 2022
- Champions: Muang Loei United
- Relegated: Mashare Chaiyaphum
- T3 National Championship: Muang Loei United; Sisaket
- Matches: 156
- Goals: 474 (3.04 per match)
- Top goalscorer: (Thailand) Watthanapon Chinthong (19 goals; Surin City)
- Best goalkeeper: (Thailand) Putawan Prangthong (11 clean sheets; Nakhon Ratchasima United)
- Biggest home win: 8 goals difference Surin City 8–0 Mashare Chaiyaphum (5 February 2022)
- Biggest away win: 7 goals difference Mashare Chaiyaphum 0–7 Muang Loei United (21 November 2021)
- Highest scoring: 10 goals Mashare Chaiyaphum 2–8 Ubon Kruanapat (11 September 2021)
- Longest winning run: 8 matches Sisaket
- Longest unbeaten run: 14 matches Nakhon Ratchasima United
- Longest winless run: 24 matches Mashare Chaiyaphum
- Longest losing run: 11 matches Mashare Chaiyaphum
- Highest attendance: 1,035; Sisaket 2–0 Mahasarakham (20 February 2022)
- Lowest attendance: 0
- Total attendance: 17,537
- Average attendance: 177

The 2021–22 Thai League 3 Northeastern region is a region in the regional stage of the 2021–22 Thai League 3. The tournament was sponsored by Blue Dragon Lottery Online, and known as the Blue Dragon League for sponsorship purposes. A total of 13 teams located in Northeastern of Thailand will compete in the league of the Northeastern region.

== Teams ==
=== Number of teams by province ===
Position	Province	Number	Teams
1	Sisaket	2	Sisaket and Sisaket United
1	Surin	2	Surin City and Surin Khong Chee Mool
2	Chaiyaphum	1	Mashare Chaiyaphum
2	Khon Kaen	1	Khon Kaen Mordindang
2	Loei	1	Muang Loei United
2	Maha Sarakham	1	Mahasarakham
2	Nakhon Ratchasima	1	Nakhon Ratchasima United
2	Sakon Nakhon	1	Sakon Nakhon
2	Ubon Ratchathani	1	Ubon Kruanapat
2	Udon Thani	1	Udon United
2	Yasothon	1	Yasothon

=== Stadiums and locations ===
Locations of the 2021–22 Thai League 3 Northeastern region teams

Team	Location	Stadium	Coordinates
Khon Kaen Mordindang	Khon Kaen (Mueang)	Stadium of Khon Kaen University	16°28′36″N 102°49′04″E
Mahasarakham	Mahasarakham (Mueang)	Mahasarakham Provincial Stadium	16°09′15″N 103°18′59″E
Mashare Chaiyaphum	Chaiyaphum (Mueang)	Chaiyaphum Provincial Stadium	15°48′28″N 102°01′16″E
Muang Loei United	Loei (Mueang)	Blue Dragon Mueang Loei Stadium	17°30′50″N 101°43′11″E
Nakhon Ratchasima United	Nakhon Ratchasima (Mueang)	Stadium of Nakhon Ratchasima Rajabhat University	14°59′07″N 102°06′53″E
Nakhon Ratchasima United	Surin (Mueang)	Stadium of Rajamangala University of Technology Isan, Surin Campus (temporary)	14°51′15″N 103°28′53″E
Sakon Nakhon	Sakon Nakhon (Mueang)	Sakon Nakhon Provincial Stadium	17°12′04″N 104°06′22″E
Sisaket	Sisaket (Mueang)	Sri Nakhon Lamduan Stadium	15°06′03″N 104°20′25″E
Sisaket United	Sisaket (Mueang)	Sri Nakhon Lamduan Stadium	15°06′03″N 104°20′25″E
Surin City	Surin (Mueang)	Sri Narong Stadium	14°52′30″N 103°29′50″E
Surin Khong Chee Mool	Surin (Mueang)	Stadium of Rajamangala University of Technology Isan, Surin Campus	14°51′15″N 103°28′53″E
Ubon Kruanapat	Ubon Ratchathani (Khueang Nai)	Stadium of Ubon Ratchathani Rajabhat University, Ban Yang Noi Campus	15°20′58″N 104°37′46″E
Udon United	Udon Thani (Mueang)	Stadium of Thailand National Sports University, Udon Thani Campus	17°24′20″N 102°46′09″E
Yasothon	Yasothon (Mueang)	Yasothon PAO. Stadium	15°46′58″N 104°09′06″E

=== Foreign players ===
A T3 team could register 3 foreign players from foreign players all around the world. A team can use 3 foreign players on the field in each game.

Note :
(substituted off) : players who released during second leg transfer window;
(substituted in) : players who registered during second leg transfer window.

AFC member countries players.
CAF member countries players.
CONCACAF member countries players.
CONMEBOL member countries players.
OFC member countries players.
UEFA member countries players.
No foreign player registered.

Club	Leg	Player 1	Player 2	Player 3
Khon Kaen Mordindang	1st	(Cameroon) Tagne Djokam Boris Wilfried (substituted off)
Khon Kaen Mordindang	2nd
Mahasarakham	1st
Mahasarakham	2nd	(Brazil) Fellipe Cabral Veloso Santos (substituted in)	(Brazil) Pedro Dias (substituted in)	(Serbia) Milan Bubalo (substituted in)
Mashare Chaiyaphum	1st	(Ghana) Joseph Quasi Amponsah	(Ghana) Armah Abraham Ayaa	(Guinea) Soumah Djibril Guineenne
Mashare Chaiyaphum	2nd	(Ghana) Joseph Quasi Amponsah	(Ghana) Armah Abraham Ayaa	(Guinea) Soumah Djibril Guineenne
Muang Loei United	1st		(Brazil) Alexandre Balotelli (substituted off)	(Brazil) Moacir (substituted off)
Muang Loei United	2nd	(Brazil) Matheus Souza Silva (substituted in)	(Brazil) Jhonatan Bernardo (substituted in)	(Brazil) Guilherme Moreira (substituted in)
Nakhon Ratchasima United	1st		(South Korea) Kim Jun-hyeon (substituted off)	(Senegal) Aliou Seck
Nakhon Ratchasima United	2nd	(Brazil) Vinícius Silva Freitas (substituted in)	(Iran) Mohammad Reza Rokni (substituted in)	(Senegal) Aliou Seck
Sakon Nakhon	1st	(Argentina) Panigazzi Matias Ignacio	(Argentina) Nicolás Torres	(Argentina) Lautaro Gayoso
Sakon Nakhon	2nd	(Argentina) Panigazzi Matias Ignacio	(Argentina) Nicolás Torres	(Argentina) Lautaro Gayoso
Sisaket	1st	(Japan) Masaki Mikami (substituted off)	(Japan) Kazuki Murakami
Sisaket	2nd	(Brazil) Célio Guilherme da Silva Santos (substituted in)	(Japan) Kazuki Murakami
Sisaket United	1st	(Brazil) Pedro Dias (substituted off)	(South Korea) Han Yun-soo (substituted off)
Sisaket United	2nd
Surin City	1st
Surin City	2nd
Surin Khong Chee Mool	1st
Surin Khong Chee Mool	2nd
Ubon Kruanapat	1st	(United States) Ibrahim Kabba (substituted off)	(Iran) Abdolreza Zarei (substituted off)	(Ghana) Oscar Plape
Ubon Kruanapat	2nd	(Portugal) Osvaldo Pinto (substituted in)	(Ivory Coast) Coulibaly Chomana (substituted in)	(Ghana) Oscar Plape
Udon United	1st	(Brazil) Célio Guilherme da Silva Santos (substituted off)	(Cameroon) Mardochee Kaham Seuntcha (substituted off)	(Iran) Eiman Kaabi (substituted off)
Udon United	2nd
Yasothon	1st
Yasothon	2nd	(Nigeria) Michael Wellington (substituted in)	(Guinea) Diop Badara Aly (substituted in)

== League table ==
=== Standings ===
Pos	Team	Pld	W	D	L	GF	GA	GD	Pts	Qualification or relegation
1	Muang Loei United (C, Q)	24	18	4	2	59	15	+44	58	Qualification to the National Championship stage
2	Sisaket (Q)	24	17	2	5	52	28	+24	53	Qualification to the National Championship stage
3	Nakhon Ratchasima United	24	15	6	3	43	21	+22	51	
4	Ubon Kruanapat	24	13	3	8	45	25	+20	42	
5	Sisaket United	24	11	7	6	50	30	+20	40	
6	Surin City	24	10	2	12	49	47	+2	32 (Note: The head-to-head points record (mini-league); Surin City 6 pts, Mahasarakham 5 pts (GD -1), Sakon Nakhon 5 pts (GD -2).)	
7	Mahasarakham	24	9	5	10	30	32	−2	32	
8	Sakon Nakhon	24	8	8	8	38	35	+3	32	
9	Yasothon	24	5	12	7	23	30	−7	27	
10	Khon Kaen Mordindang	24	7	4	13	24	45	−21	25 (Note: Khon Kaen Mordindang ahead on head-to-head points record; Khon Kaen Mordindang 6 pts, Udon United 0 pts.)	
11	Udon United	24	6	7	11	27	33	−6	25	
12	Surin Khong Chee Mool	24	1	8	15	22	57	−35	11	
13	Mashare Chaiyaphum (R)	24	0	4	20	12	76	−64	4	Relegation to the Thailand Amateur League

Source: Thai League
Rules for classification: 1) Points; 2) Head-to-head points; 3) Head-to-head goal difference; 4) Head-to-head goal scored; 5) Overall goal difference; 6) Overall goal scored; 7) Fair play points; 8) Play-off without extra time).
(C) Champions; (Q) Qualified for the phase indicated; (R) Relegated

=== Positions by round ===
Team ╲ Round	1	2	3	4	5	6	7	8	9	10	11	12	13	14	15	16	17	18	19	20	21	22	23	24	25	26
Muang Loei United	3	2	1	3	3	2	1	1	1	1	1	1	1	1	1	1	1	1	1	1	1	1	1	1	1	1
Sisaket	9	10	13	9	6	5	4	3	3	2	3	2	2	2	4	4	5	5	4	4	3	3	2	2	2	2
Nakhon Ratchasima United	4	4	5	8	4	4	3	2	2	3	2	3	3	3	2	2	2	2	2	2	2	2	3	3	3	3
Ubon Kruanapat	2	1	2	1	2	3	5	6	7	6	5	4	4	4	3	3	3	3	3	3	4	4	4	4	4	4
Sisaket United	5	5	4	6	8	6	7	5	4	5	6	5	5	5	5	5	4	4	5	5	5	5	5	5	5	5
Surin City	1	3	3	2	1	1	2	4	5	4	4	6	6	6	6	7	6	6	6	6	7	6	6	6	6	6
Mahasarakham	11	11	10	11	11	12	10	8	11	11	10	10	11	10	9	8	8	8	8	7	6	7	7	7	8	7
Sakon Nakhon	12	12	11	12	12	10	8	10	6	8	7	8	9	9	8	10	10	9	9	9	8	8	8	8	7	8
Yasothon	8	9	9	5	7	9	11	9	8	9	8	7	7	7	10	9	9	10	10	10	10	10	9	9	9	9
Khon Kaen Mordindang	13	6	6	4	5	7	6	7	9	7	9	9	8	8	7	6	7	7	7	8	9	9	10	10	11	10
Udon United	6	7	8	10	9	8	9	11	10	10	11	11	10	11	11	11	11	11	11	11	11	11	11	11	10	11
Surin Khong Chee Mool	7	8	7	7	10	11	12	12	12	12	12	12	12	12	12	12	12	12	12	12	12	12	12	12	12	12
Mashare Chaiyaphum	10	13	12	13	13	13	13	13	13	13	13	13	13	13	13	13	13	13	13	13	13	13	13	13	13	13

Source: Thai League
= Qualification to the National Championship stage; = Relegation to the Thailand Amateur League

=== Results by round ===
Team ╲ Round	1	2	3	4	5	6	7	8	9	10	11	12	13	14	15	16	17	18	19	20	21	22	23	24	25	26
Muang Loei United	W	W	W	L	N	W	W	W	D	W	W	W	L	W	W	D	N	W	W	D	W	W	W	W	D	W
Sisaket	N	L	L	W	W	W	W	W	W	W	L	W	W	D	L	L	D	W	W	W	W	W	W	W	W	N
Nakhon Ratchasima United	W	D	L	L	W	W	W	W	W	L	W	N	W	W	W	W	D	W	W	D	W	D	D	N	D	W
Ubon Kruanapat	W	W	D	W	L	L	L	N	L	W	W	W	W	W	W	D	D	W	W	N	L	L	L	W	W	L
Sisaket United	D	W	D	L	D	W	L	W	W	D	L	W	N	D	W	W	W	L	L	D	L	W	D	W	N	W
Surin City	W	D	W	W	W	D	N	L	L	W	L	L	L	W	L	L	W	W	N	L	L	W	L	W	L	L
Mahasarakham	L	L	D	D	D	L	W	W	L	L	N	W	L	W	D	W	L	W	W	W	D	L	N	L	L	W
Sakon Nakhon	L	L	D	N	D	W	W	L	W	L	W	L	D	L	D	N	L	D	W	D	W	W	D	L	D	W
Yasothon	D	N	D	W	D	L	L	W	D	D	W	D	D	N	L	D	L	W	L	D	L	L	W	D	D	D
Khon Kaen Mordindang	L	W	D	W	L	L	W	L	N	W	L	L	W	L	W	W	L	D	L	L	N	D	L	L	D	L
Udon United	D	D	N	L	W	D	L	L	W	L	L	D	W	L	N	L	W	L	L	D	W	L	D	D	W	L
Surin Khong Chee Mool	D	D	D	D	L	L	L	L	L	N	W	L	L	L	L	L	D	L	L	D	L	N	D	L	L	D
Mashare Chaiyaphum	L	L	D	L	L	N	L	L	L	L	L	L	L	L	L	D	L	N	L	L	L	L	D	L	D	L

Source: Thai League
N = No match; W = Won; D = Drawn; L = Lost

=== Results ===
Home \ Away	KKM	MSK	MCP	MLU	NRU	SNK	SKT	SKU	SRC	KCM	UBK	UDU	YST
Khon Kaen Mordindang	—	0–1	1–1	0–3	2–1	1–1	0–2	0–1	1–3	2–0	4–1	2–1	1–2
Mahasarakham	1–2	—	3–0	1–3	0–1	2–2	1–2	2–1	3–5	0–0	2–1	1–0	2–2
Mashare Chaiyaphum	0–1	0–1	—	0–7	0–3	1–3	0–1	1–6	1–3	1–1	2–8	1–4	1–1
Muang Loei United	2–0	1–0	7–0	—	0–1	1–0	2–1	1–0	2–1	4–1	1–1	2–0	4–1
Nakhon Ratchasima United	1–1	2–1	2–0	1–1	—	2–2	1–0	1–0	1–2	4–0	2–1	4–1	4–0
Sakon Nakhon	5–2	1–1	5–0	0–2	0–2	—	1–4	1–2	1–4	3–1	2–1	2–0	1–1
Sisaket	4–0	2–0	2–0	1–4	6–1	3–1	—	2–3	3–0	3–3	0–5	2–1	2–0
Sisaket United	7–0	2–1	1–1	1–2	1–1	1–1	1–1	—	5–2	2–2	0–2	3–3	1–1
Surin City	3–2	0–1	8–0	1–4	0–2	1–2	3–4	3–2	—	2–2	1–2	2–2	0–2
Surin Khong Chee Mool	0–0	0–3	2–1	2–5	0–2	2–4	1–3	0–4	0–2	—	1–3	0–2	1–1
Ubon Kruanapat	2–0	4–1	3–0	2–1	1–1	1–0	0–1	1–3	1–0	2–0	—	1–2	2–0
Udon United	1–2	0–1	1–0	0–0	2–2	0–0	0–1	1–2	1–2	2–1	1–0	—	0–0
Yasothon	2–0	1–1	2–1	0–0	0–1	0–0	0–2	0–1	3–1	2–2	0–0	2–2	—

Source: Thai League
Legend: Blue = home team win; Yellow = draw; Red = away team win.
For upcoming matches, an "a" indicates there is an article about the rivalry between the two participants.

== Season statistics ==
=== Top scorers ===
As of 26 February 2022.

Rank	Player	Club	Goals
1	(Thailand) Watthanapon Chinthong	Surin City	19
2	(Argentina) Nicolás Torres	Sakon Nakhon	13
2	(Thailand) Thongchai Ratchai	Sisaket United	13
2	(Thailand) Nattapon Thaptanon	Ubon Kruanapat (6), Muang Loei United (7)	13
2	(Ghana) Oscar Plape	Ubon Kruanapat	13
6	(Thailand) Amporn Chaipong	Muang Loei United	11
6	(Thailand) Tirawut Thiwato	Sakon Nakhon	11
6	(Thailand) Seksit Srisai	Sisaket	11

=== Hat-tricks ===
Player	For	Against	Result	Date
(Ghana) Oscar Plape^{5}	Ubon Kruanapat	Mashare Chaiyaphum	8–2 (A)	11 September 2021
(Thailand) Tirawut Thiwato	Sakon Nakhon	Mashare Chaiyaphum	5–0 (H)	7 November 2021
(Thailand) Watthanapon Chinthong	Surin City	Mashare Chaiyaphum	8–0 (H)	5 February 2022

Notes: ^{5} = Player scored 5 goals; (H) = Home team; (A) = Away team

=== Clean sheets ===
As of 26 February 2022.

Rank	Player	Club	Clean sheets
1	(Thailand) Putawan Prangthong	Nakhon Ratchasima United	11
2	(Thailand) Panupan Juheng	Muang Loei United	9
2	(Thailand) Kampon Krobyoo	Sisaket	9
4	(Thailand) Wichitchai Raksa	Ubon Kruanapat	8
5	(Thailand) Sakkongpop Sukprasert	Yasothon	6
6	(Thailand) Worawit Tason	Mahasarakham	5

== Attendances ==
=== Overall statistical table ===
Pos	Team	Total	High	Low	Average	Change
1	Mahasarakham	3,761	464	0	342	n/a
2	Yasothon	1,092	432	0	273	n/a
3	Surin City	2,017	480	0	252	n/a
4	Sisaket	2,995	1,035	71	246	n/a
5	Muang Loei United	2,121	282	114	177	n/a
6	Ubon Kruanapat	607	178	0	152	n/a
7	Udon United	1,202	200	0	134	n/a
8	Sakon Nakhon	616	180	0	123	n/a
9	Nakhon Ratchasima United	934	350	0	117	n/a
10	Khon Kaen Mordindang	888	200	0	111	n/a
11	Sisaket United	826	210	0	92	n/a
12	Surin Khong Chee Mool	478	220	0	68	n/a
13	Mashare Chaiyaphum	0	0	0	0	n/a
	League total	17,537	1,035	0	177	n/a

Updated to games played on 26 February 2022
Source: Thai League 3

=== Attendances by home match played ===
Team \ Match played	1	2	3	4	5	6	7	8	9	10	11	12	Total
Khon Kaen Mordindang	0	0	0	150	100	0	200	100	100	120	100	118	888
Mahasarakham	0	250	380	464	369	324	354	242	449	328	245	356	3,761
Mashare Chaiyaphum	0	0	0	0	0	0	0	0	0	0	0	0	0
Muang Loei United	132	200	196	194	152	133	282	114	150	250	168	150	2,121
Nakhon Ratchasima United	0	0	0	0	85	60	76	86	70	75	132	350	934
Sakon Nakhon	0	0	0	0	0	70	150	0	150	0	66	180	616
Sisaket	153	104	71	145	183	158	204	182	151	304	305	1,035	2,995
Sisaket United	0	100	32	30	59	0	210	0	65	70	200	60	826
Surin City	0	0	0	280	137	123	480	0	179	77	416	325	2,017
Surin Khong Chee Mool	0	0	0	0	0	29	96	37	56	220	20	20	478
Ubon Kruanapat	0	0	178	0	120	172	137	0	0	0	0	0	607
Udon United	0	0	139	134	0	179	142	118	50	90	150	200	1,202
Yasothon	0	0	0	0	0	132	0	0	432	0	250	278	1,092

Source: Thai League

== See also ==
- 2021–22 Thai League 1
- 2021–22 Thai League 2
- 2021–22 Thai League 3
- 2021–22 Thai League 3 Northern Region
- 2021–22 Thai League 3 Eastern Region
- 2021–22 Thai League 3 Western Region
- 2021–22 Thai League 3 Southern Region
- 2021–22 Thai League 3 Bangkok Metropolitan Region
- 2021–22 Thai League 3 National Championship
- 2021–22 Thai FA Cup
- 2021–22 Thai League Cup
- 2021 Thailand Champions Cup
