= Aitipol Kaewkeaw =

Thai footballer (born 1988)

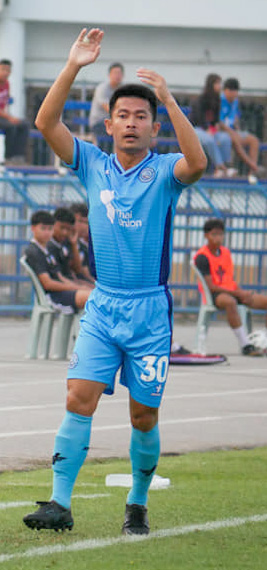
- Aitipol Kaewkeaw playing for Samut Sakhon.

Personal information
- Full name: Aitipol Kaewkeaw
- Date of birth: 11 December 1988 (age 37)
- Place of birth: Yala, Thailand
- Height: 1.67 m (5 ft 6 in)
- Position: Right-back

Team information
- Current team: Krabi
- Number: 31

Senior career*
Years	Team	Apps	(Gls)
2012–2018	Krabi		
2019	PT Prachuap	3	(0)
2019	MOF Customs United	12	(0)
2020	Samut Sakhon	3	(0)
2020–2022	Krabi	38	(0)
2022	Young Singh Hatyai United	3	(0)
2023–	Krabi	39	(0)
- * Club domestic league appearances and goals as of 27 April 2024

Aitipol Kaewkeaw (Thai: อิทธิพล แก้วเขียว; born 11 December 1988) is a Thai professional footballer who plays as a right-back for Krabi in Thai League 2.

== Honours ==
Krabi

- Thai League 3 runners-up: 2021–22
- Thai League 3 Southern Region winners: 2021–22
