= 2021–22 Thai League 3 Bangkok Metropolitan Region =

Thai League 3 Bangkok Metropolitan Region
- Season: 2021–22
- Dates: 25 September 2021 – 27 February 2022
- Champions: North Bangkok University
- Relegated: Grakcu Sai Mai United
- T3 National Championship: North Bangkok University; Bangkok
- Matches: 182
- Goals: 453 (2.49 per match)
- Top goalscorer: (Brazil) Caíque Freitas Ribeiro (17 goals; Bangkok)
- Best goalkeeper: (Thailand) Ratchaphon Namthong (10 clean sheets; Bangkok) (Thailand) Sanan Amkoed (10 clean sheets; North Bangkok University)
- Biggest home win: 7 goals difference Bangkok 7–0 Grakcu Sai Mai United (5 February 2022)
- Biggest away win: 9 goals difference Inter Bangkok 0–9 North Bangkok University (20 February 2022)
- Highest scoring: 9 goals Inter Bangkok 0–9 North Bangkok University (20 February 2022)
- Longest winning run: 5 matches North Bangkok University; Bangkok
- Longest unbeaten run: 15 matches Bangkok
- Longest winless run: 24 matches Samut Prakan
- Longest losing run: 7 matches Grakcu Sai Mai United
- Highest attendance: 500; Bangkok 6–0 Inter Bangkok (27 February 2022)
- Lowest attendance: 0
- Total attendance: 13,615
- Average attendance: 139

The 2021–22 Thai League 3 Bangkok metropolitan region is a region in the regional stage of the 2021–22 Thai League 3. The tournament was sponsored by Blue Dragon Lottery Online, and known as the Blue Dragon League for sponsorship purposes. A total of 14 teams located in Bangkok metropolitan region and Central of Thailand will compete in the league of the Bangkok metropolitan region.

== Teams ==
=== Number of teams by province ===
Position	Province	Number	Teams
1	Bangkok	8	Bangkok, Chamchuri United, Grakcu Sai Mai United, Inter Bangkok, Kasem Bundit University, Prime Bangkok, Siam, and Thonburi United
2	Nonthaburi	2	Nonthaburi United S.Boonmeerit and STK Muangnont
2	Pathum Thani	2	North Bangkok University and Royal Thai Air Force
3	Nakhon Nayok	1	Royal Thai Army
3	Samut Prakan	1	Samut Prakan

=== Stadiums and locations ===
Locations of the 2021–22 Thai League 3 Bangkok metropolitan region teams

Team	Location	Stadium	Coordinates
Bangkok	Bangkok (Thung Khru)	72nd Anniversary Stadium, Bang Mot	13°38′49″N 100°29′34″E
Chamchuri United	Bangkok (Pathum Wan)	Stadium of Chulalongkorn University	13°44′14″N 100°31′33″E
Chamchuri United	Bangkok (Minburi)	Stadium of Kasem Bundit University (temporary)	13°48′06″N 100°44′06″E
Chamchuri United	Bangkok (Pathum Wan)	Thephasadin Stadium (temporary)	13°44′44″N 100°31′39″E
Grakcu Sai Mai United	Bangkok (Sai Mai)	Grakcu Sai Mai Stadium	13°53′54″N 100°37′46″E
Inter Bangkok	Bangkok (Minburi)	72nd Anniversary Stadium, Minburi	13°48′08″N 100°47′28″E
Kasem Bundit University	Bangkok (Minburi)	Stadium of Kasem Bundit University	13°48′06″N 100°44′06″E
Nonthaburi United S.Boonmeerit	Nonthaburi (Bang Yai)	Nonthaburi Provincial Stadium	13°51′03″N 100°26′28″E
Nonthaburi United S.Boonmeerit	Bangkok (Sai Mai)	Grakcu Sai Mai Stadium (temporary)	13°53′54″N 100°37′46″E
North Bangkok University	Pathum Thani (Thanyaburi)	Stadium of North Bangkok University	14°00′22″N 100°40′24″E
Prime Bangkok	Bangkok (Din Daeng)	Thai-Japanese Stadium	13°46′00″N 100°33′10″E
Prime Bangkok	Bangkok (Minburi)	Stadium of Kasem Bundit University (temporary)	13°48′06″N 100°44′06″E
Royal Thai Air Force	Pathum Thani (Lam Luk Ka)	Thupatemi Stadium	13°57′04″N 100°37′30″E
Royal Thai Air Force	Bangkok (Sai Mai)	Grakcu Sai Mai Stadium (temporary)	13°53′54″N 100°37′46″E
Royal Thai Army	Nakhon Nayok (Mueang)	Stadium of Chulachomklao Royal Military Academy	14°17′29″N 101°10′02″E
Samut Prakan	Samut Prakan (Bang Sao Thong)	Samut Prakan Stadium	13°34′45″N 100°47′41″E
Siam	Bangkok (Minburi)	72nd Anniversary Stadium, Minburi	13°48′08″N 100°47′28″E
STK Muangnont	Nonthaburi (Mueang)	Stadium of Nonthaburi Youth Centre	13°52′44″N 100°32′39″E
Thonburi United	Bangkok (Nong Khaem)	Thonburi Stadium	13°43′28″N 100°20′43″E

Locations of teams in Bangkok metropolitan region

=== Foreign players ===
A T3 team could register 3 foreign players from foreign players all around the world. A team can use 3 foreign players on the field in each game.

Note :
(substituted off) : players who released during second leg transfer window;
(substituted in) : players who registered during second leg transfer window.

AFC member countries players.
CAF member countries players.
CONCACAF member countries players.
CONMEBOL member countries players.
OFC member countries players.
UEFA member countries players.
No foreign player registered.

Club	Leg	Player 1	Player 2	Player 3
Bangkok	1st	(South Korea) Lee Jung-jin (substituted off)	(Brazil) Caíque Freitas Ribeiro	(Norway) Peter Sørensen Nergaard
Bangkok	2nd	(Brazil) Moacir (substituted in)	(Brazil) Caíque Freitas Ribeiro	(Norway) Peter Sørensen Nergaard
Chamchuri United	1st	(Brazil) Allan Machado de Souza Rosa (substituted off)	(Cameroon) Isaac Honore Aime Mbengan	(Iran) Behnam Habibi
Chamchuri United	2nd	(Ivory Coast) Mohamed Kouadio (substituted in)	(Cameroon) Isaac Honore Aime Mbengan	(Iran) Behnam Habibi
Grakcu Sai Mai United	1st	(Colombia) Juan Pablo Camacho Artunduaga (substituted off)	(Colombia) Claros Riaño José Esteban (substituted off)	(Colombia) John Steven Cabrera Ortiz (substituted off)
Grakcu Sai Mai United	2nd		(Argentina) Ezequiel Ricardo Dávalos (substituted in)	(Paraguay) Julio Daniel Rivas Mendoza (substituted in)
Inter Bangkok	1st	(Colombia) Roberto Carlos González Mendoza (substituted off)	(Colombia) Dnilson de Jesus Fragozo Daza (substituted off)	(Colombia) Jefferson David Valdeblanquez Rico
Inter Bangkok	2nd	(Colombia) Juan Pablo Camacho Artunduaga (substituted in)	(Colombia) Claros Riaño José Esteban (substituted in)	(Colombia) Jefferson David Valdeblanquez Rico
Kasem Bundit University	1st	(Ivory Coast) Kourouma Mohamed (substituted off)	(Cameroon) David Bayiha (substituted off)	(Brazil) Ranieri Luiz Barbosa
Kasem Bundit University	2nd	(Brazil) Allan Machado de Souza Rosa (substituted in)	(Panama) Rogelio Juárez (substituted in)	(Brazil) Ranieri Luiz Barbosa
Nonthaburi United S.Boonmeerit	1st	(Ivory Coast) Coulibaly Chomana (substituted off)	(Brazil) Carlos Eduardo dos Santos Lima	(France) Zady Moise Gnenegbe
Nonthaburi United S.Boonmeerit	2nd	(Cameroon) Moussa Abakar (substituted in)	(Brazil) Carlos Eduardo dos Santos Lima	(France) Zady Moise Gnenegbe
North Bangkok University	1st	(Brazil) Leonardo Vieira Lima (substituted off)	(Namibia) Sadney Urikhob (substituted off)	(South Korea) Cho Sung-hwan
North Bangkok University	2nd	(Russia) Sergei Tumasyan (substituted in)	(South Korea) Jung Sung-min (substituted in)	(South Korea) Cho Sung-hwan
Prime Bangkok	1st	(England) Kieron Burrell (substituted off)	(Iran) Meysam Aboofazeli (substituted off)	(Japan) Omae So
Prime Bangkok	2nd	(Morocco) Achraf Tantaoui (substituted in)	(Japan) Naoya Tokai (substituted in)	(Japan) Omae So
Royal Thai Air Force	1st		(Cameroon) Bango Olivier	(Togo) Abass Ouro-Nimini
Royal Thai Air Force	2nd	(Ghana) Emmanuel Kwame Akadom (substituted in)	(Cameroon) Bango Olivier	(Togo) Abass Ouro-Nimini
Royal Thai Army	1st
Royal Thai Army	2nd
Samut Prakan	1st	(Argentina) Nicolás Gabriel Vidal (substituted off)	(Japan) So Narita (substituted off)	(Japan) Kazuo Honma
Samut Prakan	2nd	(Ivory Coast) Abdel Razak Diomande (substituted in)	(Japan) Yushi Kawaguchi (substituted in)	(Japan) Kazuo Honma
Siam	1st	(Ghana) Issa Adamu (substituted off)	(India) Gaurav Pandey (substituted off)	(Ghana) Sarfo Otis Adjei
Siam	2nd	(Argentina) Nicolás Gabriel Vidal (substituted in)	(Japan) Yusaku Yamadera (substituted in)	(Ghana) Sarfo Otis Adjei
STK Muangnont	1st	(Brazil) Fabricio Peris Carneiro (substituted off)	(Brazil) Cláudio (substituted off)	(Egypt) Ahmed Essam Lotfy Elazab
STK Muangnont	2nd	(Brazil) Gustavo Henrique (substituted in)	(Iran) Eiman Kaabi (substituted in)	(Egypt) Ahmed Essam Lotfy Elazab
Thonburi United	1st	(Guinea) Diop Badara Aly (substituted off)	(Ivory Coast) Joseph Louis Kissi	(Japan) Taiga Matsunaga
Thonburi United	2nd	(South Korea) Cho Dong-gyu (substituted in)	(Ivory Coast) Joseph Louis Kissi	(Japan) Taiga Matsunaga

== League table ==
=== Standings ===
Pos	Team	Pld	W	D	L	GF	GA	GD	Pts	Qualification or relegation
1	North Bangkok University (C, Q)	26	15	8	3	41	13	+28	53 (Note: North Bangkok University ahead on head-to-head points record; North Bangkok University 4 pts, Bangkok 1 pt.)	Qualification to the National Championship stage
2	Bangkok (Q)	26	15	8	3	55	19	+36	53	Qualification to the National Championship stage
3	Nonthaburi United S.Boonmeerit	26	13	8	5	51	29	+22	47	
4	Chamchuri United	26	12	10	4	44	23	+21	46	
5	Kasem Bundit University	26	12	8	6	35	29	+6	44	
6	Siam	26	8	11	7	26	32	−6	35	
7	Prime Bangkok	26	9	7	10	27	30	−3	34	
8	STK Muangnont	26	8	9	9	29	40	−11	33 (Note: STK Muangnont ahead on head-to-head points record; STK Muangnont 4 pts, Royal Thai Army 1 pt.)	
9	Royal Thai Army	26	7	12	7	24	23	+1	33	
10	Royal Thai Air Force	26	8	7	11	23	30	−7	31	
11	Thonburi United	26	5	13	8	32	33	−1	28	
12	Inter Bangkok	26	3	7	16	16	60	−44	16	
13	Samut Prakan	26	1	12	13	23	38	−15	15 (Note: The head-to-head record was a tie, Samut Prakan ahead on overall goals difference.)	
14	Grakcu Sai Mai United (R)	26	3	6	17	27	54	−27	15	Relegation to the Thailand Amateur League

Source: Thai League
Rules for classification: 1) Points; 2) Head-to-head points; 3) Head-to-head goal difference; 4) Head-to-head goal scored; 5) Overall goal difference; 6) Overall goal scored; 7) Fair play points; 8) Play-off without extra time).
(C) Champions; (Q) Qualified for the phase indicated; (R) Relegated

=== Positions by round ===
Team ╲ Round	1	2	3	4	5	6	7	8	9	10	11	12	13	14	15	16	17	18	19	20	21	22	23	24	25	26
North Bangkok University	2	3	2	1	1	1	2	1	1	1	1	1	1	1	1	1	3	2	2	3	3	3	3	2	2	1
Bangkok	1	8	5	2	2	2	1	2	2	3	3	2	3	3	3	3	2	1	1	1	1	1	1	1	1	2
Nonthaburi United S.Boonmeerit	3	1	4	5	5	4	3	4	3	2	2	3	2	2	2	2	1	3	3	2	2	2	2	3	3	3
Chamchuri United	4	2	1	3	3	3	4	3	5	5	4	4	5	5	5	4	4	4	4	4	4	5	4	4	4	4
Kasem Bundit University	8	9	10	9	6	7	5	5	4	4	5	5	4	4	4	5	5	5	5	5	5	4	5	5	5	5
Siam	7	4	3	4	4	5	6	7	8	8	6	8	7	10	10	10	10	9	8	9	9	9	6	7	6	6
Prime Bangkok	5	5	9	7	7	6	7	8	7	6	7	6	6	6	6	6	7	7	7	6	6	6	7	8	7	7
STK Muangnont	11	14	13	10	10	8	9	6	6	7	8	7	8	7	7	8	6	6	6	8	7	7	9	6	9	8
Royal Thai Army	12	13	12	14	14	14	12	13	13	10	10	10	10	9	9	7	8	8	9	7	8	8	8	9	8	9
Royal Thai Air Force	13	11	11	13	13	10	13	10	10	12	12	12	12	12	12	11	11	11	11	11	10	10	11	10	10	10
Thonburi United	6	7	6	8	9	11	11	11	11	11	9	9	9	8	8	9	9	10	10	10	11	11	10	11	11	11
Inter Bangkok	14	12	14	6	8	9	10	12	12	13	14	14	14	13	13	13	13	12	12	12	12	12	12	12	12	12
Samut Prakan	10	6	8	12	12	13	14	14	14	14	13	13	13	14	14	14	14	14	14	14	14	14	14	14	13	13
Grakcu Sai Mai United	9	10	7	11	11	12	8	9	9	9	11	11	11	11	11	12	12	13	13	13	13	13	13	13	14	14

Source: Thai League
= Qualification to the National Championship stage; = Relegation to Thailand Amateur League

=== Results by round ===
Team ╲ Round	1	2	3	4	5	6	7	8	9	10	11	12	13	14	15	16	17	18	19	20	21	22	23	24	25	26
North Bangkok University	W	W	D	W	W	W	D	W	W	W	D	D	W	L	D	D	D	W	L	L	D	W	W	W	W	W
Bangkok	W	L	W	W	W	W	W	D	L	D	W	W	D	D	D	W	W	W	D	D	D	W	W	W	L	W
Nonthaburi United S.Boonmeerit	W	W	L	D	D	W	W	L	W	W	W	D	W	D	W	D	W	D	L	W	D	W	W	L	D	L
Chamchuri United	W	W	D	D	W	L	D	W	D	D	W	D	D	L	D	D	W	W	W	L	W	L	W	W	W	D
Kasem Bundit University	L	D	L	W	W	D	W	W	W	D	D	D	W	L	D	L	W	D	W	D	W	W	L	W	L	W
Siam	W	W	D	D	W	L	L	L	L	D	W	L	D	D	D	D	D	D	W	D	L	W	W	L	W	D
Prime Bangkok	W	L	W	L	D	W	L	L	W	D	L	D	W	W	D	L	L	D	D	W	W	L	L	L	W	D
STK Muangnont	L	L	D	W	D	W	L	W	W	L	L	D	L	W	D	D	W	D	D	D	W	L	L	W	L	D
Royal Thai Army	L	L	D	L	L	D	W	D	L	W	D	D	W	W	D	W	L	D	D	W	D	D	D	L	W	D
Royal Thai Air Force	L	L	D	L	D	W	L	W	D	L	L	D	L	D	D	W	L	L	W	W	W	D	L	W	W	L
Thonburi United	W	L	D	D	L	L	D	D	D	D	W	D	D	W	D	D	D	L	D	L	L	W	W	L	L	D
Inter Bangkok	L	W	W	L	L	D	L	L	L	L	L	D	L	D	W	L	D	D	D	D	L	L	L	L	L	L
Samut Prakan	L	W	L	L	L	L	L	D	D	D	D	D	L	L	L	D	L	D	L	D	L	L	D	D	D	D
Grakcu Sai Mai United	L	W	L	L	L	W	W	L	L	D	L	D	L	D	L	D	L	L	L	L	L	L	L	D	L	D

Source: Thai League
W = Won; D = Drawn; L = Lost

=== Results ===
Home \ Away	BKK	CCU	GSU	IBK	KBU	NBS	NBU	PBK	AIR	ARM	SPK	SIA	STK	TBU
Bangkok	—	0–0	7–0	6–0	3–1	0–5	0–1	2–0	3–0	2–1	0–0	2–0	3–1	5–2
Chamchuri United	1–0	—	2–1	4–0	0–1	1–0	2–1	2–0	5–1	0–0	2–0	1–1	1–2	1–1
Grakcu Sai Mai United	1–1	1–1	—	2–1	0–2	1–2	1–2	1–3	0–1	0–1	2–2	5–1	2–3	0–2
Inter Bangkok	0–3	0–4	0–0	—	1–4	1–2	0–9	1–1	0–0	0–2	3–2	0–1	0–0	2–2
Kasem Bundit University	0–3	0–0	2–0	2–1	—	2–1	1–2	1–0	1–0	1–1	2–1	1–1	1–1	0–0
Nonthaburi United S.Boonmeerit	2–2	2–0	1–4	4–1	4–3	—	0–0	0–0	3–0	1–0	1–1	2–2	3–0	2–2
North Bangkok University	0–0	0–0	1–0	3–0	1–1	2–1	—	1–2	1–0	2–0	2–2	0–0	1–0	2–0
Prime Bangkok	1–1	2–2	2–1	3–0	1–0	0–3	0–1	—	2–1	1–1	2–1	1–2	2–1	0–1
Royal Thai Air Force	0–2	2–1	3–1	2–0	3–0	3–1	0–2	1–0	—	0–0	0–0	0–0	0–1	1–1
Royal Thai Army	1–3	1–1	2–0	1–2	3–3	0–0	1–0	3–1	2–1	—	0–0	0–1	1–1	1–0
Samut Prakan	1–1	2–3	1–1	1–2	1–2	1–2	0–2	1–1	1–2	1–1	—	1–1	0–2	2–1
Siam	0–4	2–2	3–0	0–0	0–2	1–3	1–1	2–1	2–1	0–0	1–0	—	0–1	1–1
STK Muangnont	1–1	2–6	2–2	1–0	1–1	1–5	0–3	0–1	1–1	1–0	0–0	2–1	—	3–3
Thonburi United	0–1	1–2	6–1	1–1	0–1	1–1	1–1	0–0	0–0	1–1	2–1	1–2	2–1	—

Source: Thai League
Legend: Blue = home team win; Yellow = draw; Red = away team win.
For upcoming matches, an "a" indicates there is an article about the rivalry between the two participants.

== Season statistics ==
=== Top scorers ===
As of 27 February 2022.

Rank	Player	Club	Goals
1	(Brazil) Caíque Freitas Ribeiro	Bangkok	17
2	(Brazil) Carlos Eduardo dos Santos Lima	Nonthaburi United S.Boonmeerit	12
3	(Thailand) Woraphot Somsang	Nonthaburi United S.Boonmeerit	11
4	(Japan) Kazuo Honma	Samut Prakan	10
5	(Thailand) Somsak Musikaphan	Bangkok	9
5	(Cameroon) Isaac Honore Aime Mbengan	Chamchuri United	9
5	(Thailand) Thitiwat Phranmaen	North Bangkok University	9
5	(Argentina) Nicolás Gabriel Vidal	Samut Prakan (3), Siam (6)	9
5	(Ghana) Sarfo Otis Adjei	Siam	9

=== Hat-tricks ===
Player	For	Against	Result	Date
(Cameroon) Isaac Honore Aime Mbengan	Chamchuri United	STK Muangnont	6–2 (A)	3 October 2021
(Brazil) Carlos Eduardo dos Santos Lima	Nonthaburi United S.Boonmeerit	Bangkok	5–0 (A)	3 October 2021
(Thailand) Sakda Koomgun	Bangkok	Grakcu Sai Mai United	7–0 (H)	5 February 2022
(Ivory Coast) Mohamed Kouadio	Chamchuri United	Inter Bangkok	4–0 (A)	13 February 2022
(Russia) Sergei Tumasyan^{4}	North Bangkok University	Inter Bangkok	9–0 (A)	20 February 2022
(Brazil) Caíque Freitas Ribeiro	Bangkok	Inter Bangkok	6–0 (H)	27 February 2022

Notes: ^{4} = Player scored 4 goals; (H) = Home team; (A) = Away team

=== Clean sheets ===
As of 27 February 2022.

Rank	Player	Club	Clean sheets
1	(Thailand) Ratchaphon Namthong	Bangkok	10
1	(Thailand) Sanan Amkoed	North Bangkok University	10
3	(Thailand) Chitchana Tuksinpila	Kasem Bundit University	8
4	(Thailand) Wichanon Chomchuen	Royal Thai Air Force	7
4	(Thailand) Phoomin Thumraksa	Siam	7
6	(Thailand) Nattapon Meesaeng	Nonthaburi United S.Boonmeerit	6
6	(Thailand) Kittitat Jeennok	Royal Thai Army	6

== Attendances ==
=== Overall statistical table ===
Pos	Team	Total	High	Low	Average	Change
1	Royal Thai Air Force	2,747	330	0	275	n/a
2	Bangkok	1,842	500	0	184	n/a
3	Thonburi United	1,123	250	0	160	n/a
4	North Bangkok University	1,415	250	0	142	n/a
5	STK Muangnont	1,343	216	0	134	n/a
6	Siam	127	127	0	127	n/a
7	Samut Prakan	1,258	400	0	105	n/a
8	Nonthaburi United S.Boonmeerit	1,140	150	0	114	n/a
9	Royal Thai Army	820	123	0	103	n/a
10	Grakcu Sai Mai United	876	200	0	97	n/a
11	Inter Bangkok	864	150	0	86	n/a
12	Prime Bangkok	60	60	0	60	n/a
13	Chamchuri United	0	0	0	0	n/a
14	Kasem Bundit University	0	0	0	0	n/a
	League total	13,615	500	0	139	n/a

Updated to games played on 27 February 2022
Source: Thai League 3

=== Attendances by home match played ===
Team \ Match played	1	2	3	4	5	6	7	8	9	10	1	12	13	Total
Bangkok	0	0	0	130	100	100	100	350	100	112	100	250	500	1,842
Chamchuri United	0	0	0	0	0	0	0	0	0	0	0	0	0	0
Grakcu Sai Mai United	0	0	40	0	115	30	200	20	200	31	0	120	120	876
Inter Bangkok	0	0	0	60	50	50	115	150	60	110	129	80	60	864
Kasem Bundit University	0	0	0	0	0	0	0	0	0	0	0	0	0	0
Nonthaburi United S.Boonmeerit	0	0	0	100	100	150	120	80	110	80	150	150	100	1,140
North Bangkok University	70	0	0	0	250	210	70	150	150	150	215	120	180	1,415
Prime Bangkok	0	0	0	0	0	0	0	0	0	0	0	0	60	60
Royal Thai Air Force	0	0	0	330	245	360	253	235	265	272	231	259	297	2,747
Royal Thai Army	48	0	0	0	0	94	95	0	110	120	120	110	123	820
Samut Prakan	0	63	37	125	75	74	65	58	74	150	153	187	197	1,258
Siam	0	0	0	127	0	0	0	0	0	0	0	0	0	127
STK Muangnont	0	0	0	151	100	183	111	129	127	121	119	86	216	1,343
Thonburi United	0	0	0	0	0	0	220	123	72	153	150	155	250	1,123

Source: Thai League

== See also ==
- 2021–22 Thai League 1
- 2021–22 Thai League 2
- 2021–22 Thai League 3
- 2021–22 Thai League 3 Northern Region
- 2021–22 Thai League 3 Northeastern Region
- 2021–22 Thai League 3 Eastern Region
- 2021–22 Thai League 3 Western Region
- 2021–22 Thai League 3 Southern Region
- 2021–22 Thai League 3 National Championship
- 2021–22 Thai FA Cup
- 2021–22 Thai League Cup
- 2021 Thailand Champions Cup
