= Seydou Koné (footballer, born 1987) =

Ivorian footballer

Personal information
- Date of birth: 26 December 1987 (age 38)
- Place of birth: Ivory Coast
- Height: 1.79 m (5 ft 10 1/2 in)
- Position: Center back

Senior career*
| Years | Team | Apps | (Gls) |
| 2010 | Buriram PEA | 22 | (1) |
| 2011–2013 | Songkhla United | 25 | (2) |
| 2014 | Samut Songkhram | 24 | (2) |
| 2015–2022 | Krabi | 98 | (11) |
- * Club domestic league appearances and goals as of 24 April 2022

Seydou Koné (born 26 December 1987) is an Ivorian professional footballer who has played in Thai League 3 in Thailand.

== Honours ==
- Thai League 3

(silver) Runners-up : 2021–22

- Thai League 3 Southern Region

(gold) Winners : 2021–22
