= Chigozie Mbah =

Nigerian footballer

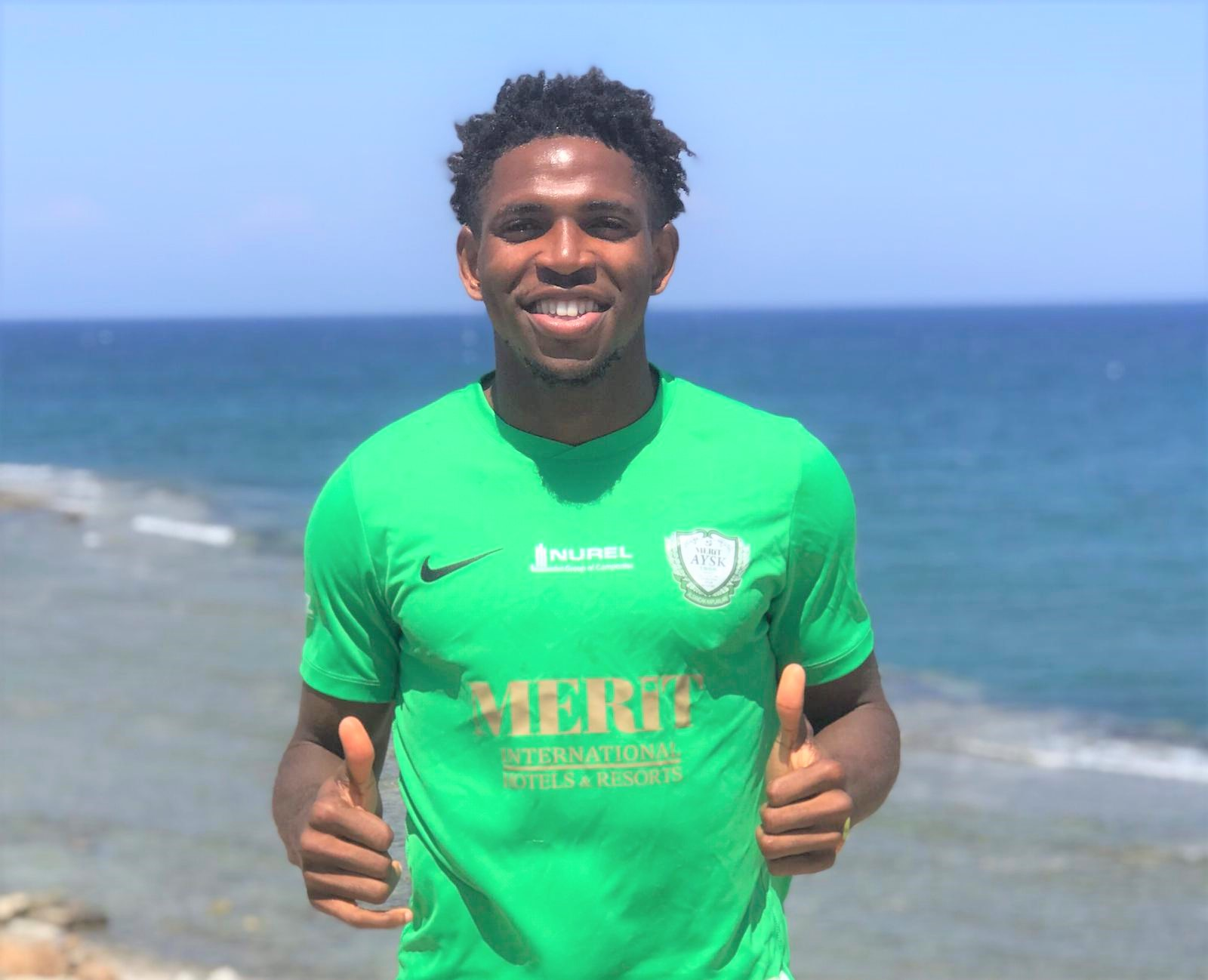
- Chigozie Mbah in 2019

Personal information
- Full name: Chigozie Emmanuel Mbah
- Date of birth: 18 September 1997 (age 29)
- Place of birth: Nigeria
- Position: Winger

Team information
- Current team: Gyeongnam
- Number: 10

Youth career
- –2016: Brooke House College

Senior career*
| Years | Team | Apps | (Gls) |
| 2016–2017 | Žilina II | 41 | (8) |
| 2016–2017 | Žilina | 5 | (0) |
| 2017–2018 | Slavia Sofia | 21 | (0) |
| 2019–2020 | Alsancak Yeşilova | | |
| 2021–2022 | Uthai Thani | 22 | (11) |
| 2022–2023 | Krabi | 34 | (12) |
| 2023–2024 | Uthai Thani | 27 | (4) |
| 2024–2025 | Khaitan SC | | |
| 2025–2026 | Uthai Thani | 11 | (1) |
| 2026– | Gyeongnam | 7 | (0) |
- * Club domestic league appearances and goals as of 6 August 2026

Chigozie Emmanuel Mbah (born 18 September 1997) is a Nigerian professional footballer who currently plays as a winger for South Korean club Gyeongnam.

== Club career ==
=== MŠK Žilina ===
He came to MŠK Žilina from lower English league in Winter 2016. Mbah made his Fortuna Liga debut for Žilina against Skalica on 26 February 2016.

=== Slavia Sofia ===
In July 2017, Mbah signed with Bulgarian club Slavia Sofia.

=== Alsancak Yeşilova ===
On 16 August 2019 it was confirmed, that Mbah had joined Cypriot club Merit Alsancak Yeşilova Spor Kulübü.

== Honours ==
=== Club ===
Uthai Thani

- Thai League 3 (1): 2021–22
- Thai League 3 Northern Region (1): 2021–22
