= Júnior Lopes (footballer, born 1987) =

Brazilian footballer

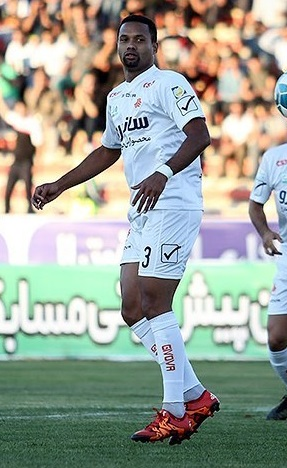

Personal information
- Full name: Lourival Júnior de Araújo Lopes
- Date of birth: 17 October 1987 (age 39)
- Place of birth: Porto Velho, Brazil
- Height: 1.90 m (6 ft 3 in)
- Position: Centre-back

Youth career
- Vitória

Senior career*
| Years | Team | Apps | (Gls) |
| 2006 | Vitória | 0 | (0) |
| 2007 | Ituano | 10 | (0) |
| 2008 | Gama | | |
| 2008 | Paranoá | | |
| 2008–2009 | Čelik Zenica | 0 | (0) |
| 2010 | Horizonte | 1 | (0) |
| 2010–2012 | Bragantino | 54 | (3) |
| 2012–2013 | Académica | 2 | (0) |
| 2013 | Nova Iguaçu | 4 | (0) |
| 2014 | Paraná | 0 | (0) |
| 2014 | Guarany Sobral | 7 | (1) |
| 2015 | Goiás | 11 | (0) |
| 2015–2016 | Oeste | 14 | (1) |
| 2016 | Boa | 1 | (0) |
| 2016–2017 | Saipa | 13 | (0) |
| 2017 | Persiba Balikpapan | 15 | (2) |
| 2018 | Sertãozinho | 0 | (0) |
| 2018 | Botafogo-PB | 9 | (1) |
| 2019 | Madureira | 0 | (0) |
| 2019 | Confiança | 2 | (0) |
| 2019–2020 | Chonburi | 18 | (1) |
| 2020–2021 | Trat | 13 | (0) |
| 2021–2022 | Uthai Thani | 21 | (3) |
| Total | | 195 | (12) |
- * Club domestic league appearances and goals

Lourival Júnior de Araújo Lopes (born 19 October 1987), known as Júnior Lopes, is a Brazilian former professional footballer who played as a centre-back.

== Honours ==
Uthai Thani

- Thai League 3: 2021–22
- Thai League 3 Northern Region: 2021–22
