= 2021–22 Thai League 3 Eastern Region =

Thai League 3 Eastern Region
- Season: 2021–22
- Dates: 18 September 2021 – 26 February 2022
- Champions: Pattaya Dolphins United
- Relegated: Sakaeo; Royal Thai Fleet
- T3 National Championship: Pattaya Dolphins United; Chachoengsao Hi-Tek
- Matches: 132
- Goals: 356 (2.7 per match)
- Top goalscorer: (Brazil) Pedro Augusto Silva Rodrigues (20 goals; Pattaya Dolphins United)
- Best goalkeeper: (Thailand) Pitsanu Permsab (10 clean sheets; Chachoengsao Hi-Tek)
- Biggest home win: 6 goals difference Pattaya Dolphins United 6–0 Marines Eureka (21 November 2021)
- Biggest away win: 6 goals difference Marines Eureka 0–6 Pattaya Dolphins United (13 February 2022)
- Highest scoring: 9 goals ACDC 2–7 Bankhai United (20 November 2021)
- Longest winning run: 7 matches Pattaya Dolphins United
- Longest unbeaten run: 15 matches Pattaya Dolphins United; Chachoengsao Hi-Tek
- Longest winless run: 9 matches Chanthaburi; Royal Thai Fleet
- Longest losing run: 8 matches Marines Eureka
- Highest attendance: 726; Chachoengsao Hi-Tek 1–0 Pattaya Dolphins United (20 January 2022)
- Lowest attendance: 0
- Total attendance: 17,585
- Average attendance: 198

The 2021–22 Thai League 3 Eastern region is a region in the regional stage of the 2021–22 Thai League 3. The tournament was sponsored by Blue Dragon Lottery Online, and known as the Blue Dragon League for sponsorship purposes. A total of 12 teams located in Eastern of Thailand will compete in the league of the Eastern region.

== Teams ==
=== Number of teams by province ===
Position	Province	Number	Teams
1	Chonburi	5	ACDC, Banbueng, Marines Eureka, Pattaya Dolphins United, and Royal Thai Fleet
2	Chanthaburi	2	Assawin Kohkwang United and Chanthaburi
2	Rayong	2	Bankhai United and Pluakdaeng United
3	Chachoengsao	1	Chachoengsao Hi-Tek
3	Prachinburi	1	Saimit Kabin United
3	Sa Kaeo	1	Sakaeo

=== Stadiums and locations ===
Locations of the 2021–22 Thai League 3 Eastern region teams

Team	Location	Stadium	Coordinates
ACDC	Chonburi (Sattahip)	Battleship Stadium	12°39′39″N 100°55′24″E
Assawin Kohkwang United	Chanthaburi (Mueang)	Stadium of Rambhai Barni Rajabhat University	12°39′50″N 102°06′06″E
Banbueng	Chonburi (Banbueng)	Chang Football Park Stadium	13°18′09″N 101°12′10″E
Banbueng	Chonburi (Mueang)	Chonburi Stadium (temporary)	13°20′11″N 100°57′23″E
Bankhai United	Rayong (Ban Khai)	Wai Krong Stadium	12°48′26″N 101°17′51″E
Chachoengsao Hi-Tek	Chachoengsao (Mueang)	Chachoengsao Municipality Stadium	13°41′24″N 101°04′06″E
Chanthaburi	Chanthaburi (Mueang)	Chanthaburi Provincial Stadium	12°36′36″N 102°06′20″E
Marines Eureka	Chonburi (Sattahip)	Sattahip Navy Stadium	12°39′49″N 100°56′09″E
Pattaya Dolphins United	Chonburi (Bang Lamung)	Nong Prue Stadium	12°55′27″N 100°56′14″E
Pluakdaeng United	Rayong (Pluak Daeng)	CK Stadium	12°59′04″N 101°12′55″E
Royal Thai Fleet	Chonburi (Sattahip)	Battleship Stadium	12°39′39″N 100°55′24″E
Saimit Kabin United	Prachinburi (Kabin Buri)	Nomklao Maharat Stadium	13°59′20″N 101°43′25″E
Sakaeo	Sakaeo (Mueang)	Sakaeo PAO. Stadium	13°46′21″N 102°10′43″E

=== Foreign players ===
A T3 team could register 3 foreign players from foreign players all around the world. A team can use 3 foreign players on the field in each game.

Note :
(substituted off) : players who released during second leg transfer window;
(substituted on) : players who registered during second leg transfer window.

AFC member countries players.
CAF member countries players.
CONCACAF member countries players.
CONMEBOL member countries players.
OFC member countries players.
UEFA member countries players.
No foreign player registered.

Club	Leg	Player 1	Player 2	Player 3
ACDC	1st
ACDC	2nd
Assawin Kohkwang United	1st	(Brazil) Marlon Costa Santos Vieira de Araújo (substituted off)	(Ghana) Amidu Jamal	(Guinea) Sory Diane
Assawin Kohkwang United	2nd	(Ivory Coast) Soumahoro Mafa (substituted on)	(Ghana) Amidu Jamal	(Guinea) Sory Diane
Banbueng	1st
Banbueng	2nd	(Ivory Coast) Diarra Junior Aboubacar (substituted on)	(Ivory Coast) Oumar Sanou (substituted on)	(Cameroon) David Bayiha (substituted on)
Bankhai United	1st			(Brazil) Victor Amaro
Bankhai United	2nd	(Brazil) Thiago de Jesús dos Santos (substituted on)	(Argentina) Nicolás Abot (substituted on)	(Brazil) Victor Amaro
Chachoengsao Hi-Tek	1st	(Brazil) Caio da Conceição Silva	(Cameroon) Nyamsi Jacques Dominique
Chachoengsao Hi-Tek	2nd	(Brazil) Caio da Conceição Silva	(Cameroon) Nyamsi Jacques Dominique
Chanthaburi	1st	(Ivory Coast) Akpa Agbandji Augustin (substituted off)	(Ivory Coast) Abdel Razak Diomande (substituted off)	(United States) Kapaw Htoo
Chanthaburi	2nd	(Brazil) Gustavo (substituted on)	(South Korea) Park Jae-hyung (substituted on)	(United States) Kapaw Htoo
Marines Eureka	1st
Marines Eureka	2nd	(Ivory Coast) Ange Didier Merveil Kere (substituted on)	(Cameroon) Nguimbus Ferdinand (substituted on)
Pattaya Dolphins United	1st		(Myanmar) Aung Kyaw Naing (substituted off)	(Brazil) Pedro Augusto Silva Rodrigues
Pattaya Dolphins United	2nd	(Brazil) Emerson Brito dos Santos (substituted on)	(Argentina) Nicolás Vélez (substituted on)	(Brazil) Pedro Augusto Silva Rodrigues
Pluakdaeng United	1st		(Argentina) Leonardo Martín Ferrari (substituted off)	(United States) Christian Joseph Sacchini
Pluakdaeng United	2nd	(Egypt) Fathy Hamdy Fathy Mamoun (substituted on)	(Egypt) Mohamed Samir (substituted on)	(United States) Christian Joseph Sacchini
Royal Thai Fleet	1st
Royal Thai Fleet	2nd
Saimit Kabin United	1st		(Ivory Coast) Oumar Sanou (substituted off)	(Brazil) Victor Clemente de Oliveira
Saimit Kabin United	2nd	(Brazil) Fabricio Peris Carneiro (substituted on)	(Nigeria) Efe Obode (substituted on)	(Brazil) Victor Clemente de Oliveira
Sakaeo	1st	(Cameroon) Sandjo Kwayep Jislin Aime (substituted off)	(Zambia) Noah Chivuta
Sakaeo	2nd	(Egypt) Basam Radwan Mahmoud Mohamed Afify (substituted on)	(Zambia) Noah Chivuta

== League table ==
=== Standings ===
Pos	Team	Pld	W	D	L	GF	GA	GD	Pts	Qualification or relegation
1	Pattaya Dolphins United (C, Q)	22	16	5	1	62	14	+48	53	Qualification to the National Championship stage
2	Chachoengsao Hi-Tek (Q)	22	13	6	3	34	17	+17	45	Qualification to the National Championship stage
3	Pluakdaeng United	22	12	4	6	29	23	+6	40	
4	Bankhai United	22	10	9	3	37	22	+15	39	
5	Saimit Kabin United	22	10	7	5	34	27	+7	37	
6	Assawin Kohkwang United	22	8	8	6	29	24	+5	32 (Note: Assawin Kohkwang United ahead on head-to-head points record; Assawin Kohkwang United 6 pts, ACDC 0 pts.)	
7	ACDC	22	8	8	6	30	33	−3	32	
8	Chanthaburi	22	4	7	11	28	38	−10	19	
9	Sakaeo (R)	22	4	5	13	18	35	−17	17	Relegation to Thailand Amateur League (Note: Sakaeo administratively relegated to 2023 Thailand Amateur League by FA Thailand decision because of the failure about club licensing.)
10	Banbueng	22	3	7	12	22	38	−16	16	
11	Marines Eureka	22	4	3	15	12	36	−24	15 (Note: The head-to-head record was a tie, Marines Eureka ahead on overall goals difference.)	
12	Royal Thai Fleet (R)	22	4	3	15	21	49	−28	15	Relegation to the Thailand Amateur League

Source: Thai League
Rules for classification: 1) Points; 2) Head-to-head points; 3) Head-to-head goal difference; 4) Head-to-head goal scored; 5) Overall goal difference; 6) Overall goal scored; 7) Fair play points; 8) Play-off without extra time).
(C) Champions; (Q) Qualified for the phase indicated; (R) Relegated

=== Positions by round ===
Team ╲ Round	1	2	3	4	5	6	7	8	9	10	11	12	13	14	15	16	17	18	19	20	21	22
Pattaya Dolphins United	1	1	2	1	1	1	1	1	1	1	1	1	1	1	1	1	1	1	1	1	1	1
Chachoengsao Hi-Tek	6	4	5	7	4	5	3	5	4	6	6	5	4	3	3	3	2	3	2	2	2	2
Pluakdaeng United	10	12	8	5	6	3	5	3	6	4	3	4	2	6	4	4	4	4	4	5	4	3
Bankhai United	3	2	1	2	2	2	2	2	2	2	2	2	3	2	2	2	3	2	3	3	3	4
Saimit Kabin United	2	5	6	8	8	6	4	6	5	3	5	6	5	5	6	6	5	6	6	4	5	5
Assawin Kohkwang United	4	3	3	3	3	4	6	4	3	5	4	3	6	4	5	5	6	5	5	6	6	6
ACDC	11	11	11	9	9	10	7	7	7	7	7	7	8	7	7	7	7	7	7	7	7	7
Chanthaburi	7	8	10	6	7	8	9	9	9	10	9	11	10	10	8	8	8	8	8	8	9	8
Sakaeo	12	7	4	4	5	7	8	8	8	8	8	8	9	9	10	10	10	10	11	9	8	9
Banbueng	8	9	9	10	10	9	10	10	11	11	11	10	11	11	11	11	11	12	10	11	10	10
Marines Eureka	9	10	12	12	12	12	11	11	12	12	12	12	12	12	12	12	12	11	12	12	12	11
Royal Thai Fleet	5	6	7	11	11	11	12	12	10	9	10	9	7	8	9	9	9	9	9	10	11	12

Source: Thai League
= Qualification to the National Championship stage; = Relegation to Thailand Amateur League

=== Results by round ===
Team ╲ Round	1	2	3	4	5	6	7	8	9	10	11	12	13	14	15	16	17	18	19	20	21	22
Pattaya Dolphins United	W	W	D	W	W	W	W	W	W	W	D	D	W	D	W	L	W	W	D	W	W	W
Chachoengsao Hi-Tek	D	W	D	L	W	L	W	D	W	D	D	W	W	W	W	W	D	W	W	W	W	L
Pluakdaeng United	L	L	W	W	D	W	L	W	D	W	W	D	W	L	W	W	W	L	L	D	W	W
Bankhai United	W	W	W	D	D	D	W	W	L	W	D	D	L	W	W	W	D	W	D	D	L	D
Saimit Kabin United	W	L	D	L	D	W	W	D	W	W	D	D	W	D	L	D	W	L	W	W	L	W
Assawin Kohkwang United	W	W	D	D	D	L	L	W	W	D	W	W	L	W	L	D	D	D	W	L	D	L
ACDC	L	L	D	W	D	D	W	W	D	L	D	L	L	W	W	W	D	D	W	D	W	L
Chanthaburi	D	D	L	W	D	D	L	L	L	L	D	L	D	W	W	L	D	L	L	L	L	W
Sakaeo	L	W	W	D	D	L	L	L	L	D	W	L	D	L	L	L	L	L	L	W	D	L
Banbueng	L	D	D	D	L	W	L	L	L	L	L	W	L	L	L	L	D	L	W	D	D	D
Marines Eureka	L	L	L	L	D	L	W	L	L	L	L	L	L	L	L	W	D	W	L	L	D	W
Royal Thai Fleet	W	L	L	L	L	D	L	L	W	D	L	W	W	L	L	L	L	D	L	L	L	L

Source: Thai League
W = Won; D = Drawn; L = Lost

=== Results ===
Home \ Away	ACD	AKU	BBG	BKU	CCH	CTB	MRE	PAT	PDU	RTF	SKU	SAK
ACDC	—	1–3	1–0	2–7	0–1	0–0	1–0	1–2	4–1	1–1	1–1	3–1
Assawin Kohkwang United	4–0	—	1–0	1–1	1–1	2–1	0–0	1–1	1–0	6–1	2–2	1–1
Banbueng	2–2	1–1	—	2–3	0–1	3–1	2–1	1–2	0–2	2–0	1–3	1–1
Bankhai United	0–0	2–0	0–0	—	1–1	3–0	1–1	3–4	1–0	0–1	2–0	0–0
Chachoengsao Hi-Tek	2–2	2–1	3–0	3–0	—	0–0	3–0	1–0	3–1	1–1	2–1	3–1
Chanthaburi	2–4	0–1	2–2	3–3	2–0	—	2–1	1–1	0–2	2–0	2–4	1–1
Marines Eureka	0–1	0–1	1–0	1–3	0–1	2–2	—	0–6	0–1	1–0	1–2	2–0
Pattaya Dolphins United	4–1	4–0	4–0	1–1	1–0	2–0	6–0	—	0–0	5–0	3–1	5–1
Pluakdaeng United	0–0	2–0	1–1	0–2	3–2	2–0	2–0	1–5	—	3–1	4–2	1–0
Royal Thai Fleet	0–2	2–2	4–1	1–2	2–3	0–4	1–0	0–4	1–2	—	3–4	1–0
Saimit Kabin United	1–2	1–0	2–2	0–0	0–0	1–0	1–0	1–1	0–0	2–0	—	3–0
Sakaeo	1–1	1–0	2–1	1–2	0–1	4–3	0–1	0–1	0–1	2–1	1–2	—

Source: Thai League
Legend: Blue = home team win; Yellow = draw; Red = away team win.
For upcoming matches, an "a" indicates there is an article about the rivalry between the two participants.

== Season statistics ==
=== Top scorers ===
As of 26 February 2022.

Rank	Player	Club	Goals
1	(Brazil) Pedro Augusto Silva Rodrigues	Pattaya Dolphins United	20
2	(Thailand) Anuwat Nakkasem	Bankhai United	15
3	(Thailand) Warut Trongkratok	Pluakdaeng United	14
4	(Thailand) Patipat Kamsat	Assawin Kohkwang United	11
5	(Brazil) Caio da Conceição Silva	Chachoengsao Hi-Tek	9
5	(Thailand) Sarawut Choenchai	Chachoengsao Hi-Tek	9
7	(Brazil) Fabricio Peris Carneiro	Saimit Kabin United	8

=== Hat-tricks ===
Player	For	Against	Result	Date
(Brazil) Pedro Augusto Silva Rodrigues^{4}	Pattaya Dolphins United	Royal Thai Fleet	4–0 (A)	17 October 2021
(Thailand) Panuwit Sriwichai	Bankhai United	ACDC	7–2 (A)	20 November 2021
(Thailand) Thanadon Supaphon	Chanthaburi	Royal Thai Fleet	4–0 (A)	8 January 2022
(Brazil) Fabricio Peris Carneiro	Saimit Kabin United	Chanthaburi	4–2 (A)	13 February 2022

Notes: ^{4} = Player scored 4 goals; (H) = Home team; (A) = Away team

=== Clean sheets ===
As of 26 February 2022.

Rank	Player	Club	Clean sheets
1	(Thailand) Pitsanu Permsab	Chachoengsao Hi-Tek	10
2	(Thailand) Kittisak Foofoong	Pluakdaeng United	9
3	(Thailand) Thanongsak Phanphiphat	Bankhai United	6
3	(Thailand) Sarayut Poolsap	Saimit Kabin United	6
5	(Thailand) Nattakitt Nimnual	Assawin Kohkwang United	5
6	(Thailand) Tossapol Sritecha	ACDC	4
6	(Thailand) Chairat Ketsaratikun	Chanthaburi	4
6	(Thailand) Thitikit Samerjai	Pattaya Dolphins United	4

== Attendances ==
=== Overall statistical table ===
Pos	Team	Total	High	Low	Average	Change
1	Pattaya Dolphins United	4,386	527	0	438	n/a
2	Chachoengsao Hi-Tek	3,052	726	0	339	n/a
3	Sakaeo	1,265	400	0	181	n/a
4	Bankhai United	1,789	300	0	179	n/a
5	ACDC	785	220	0	157	n/a
6	Marines Eureka	1,392	258	0	155	n/a
7	Banbueng	1,132	240	0	142	n/a
8	Assawin Kohkwang United	822	250	0	137	n/a
9	Pluakdaeng United	1,165	150	0	129	n/a
10	Royal Thai Fleet	643	213	0	129	n/a
11	Saimit Kabin United	699	160	0	117	n/a
12	Chanthaburi	455	150	0	91	n/a
	League total	17,585	726	0	198	n/a

Updated to games played on 26 February 2022
Source: Thai League 3

=== Attendances by home match played ===
Team \ Match played	1	2	3	4	5	6	7	8	9	10	11	Total
ACDC	0	0	0	0	0	0	220	130	120	115	200	785
Assawin Kohkwang United	0	0	0	0	0	200	176	39	57	250	100	822
Banbueng	0	78	94	240	150	120	200	0	0	150	100	1,132
Bankhai United	0	152	300	250	117	150	158	152	260	150	100	1,789
Chachoengsao Hi-Tek	0	0	300	384	281	180	317	726	360	354	150	3,052
Chanthaburi	0	0	0	0	0	0	82	58	113	52	150	455
Marines Eureka	0	0	258	120	60	130	174	152	100	230	168	1,392
Pattaya Dolphins United	0	339	550	500	527	526	347	388	323	375	511	4,386
Pluakdaeng United	0	0	120	120	120	120	125	150	140	120	150	1,165
Royal Thai Fleet	0	0	0	0	0	0	60	213	150	130	90	643
Saimit Kabin United	0	0	150	64	160	110	75	0	0	140	0	699
Sakaeo	0	0	0	0	82	103	141	150	400	189	200	1,265

Source: Thai League

== See also ==
- 2021–22 Thai League 1
- 2021–22 Thai League 2
- 2021–22 Thai League 3
- 2021–22 Thai League 3 Northern Region
- 2021–22 Thai League 3 Northeastern Region
- 2021–22 Thai League 3 Western Region
- 2021–22 Thai League 3 Southern Region
- 2021–22 Thai League 3 Bangkok Metropolitan Region
- 2021–22 Thai League 3 National Championship
- 2021–22 Thai FA Cup
- 2021–22 Thai League Cup
- 2021 Thailand Champions Cup
