= Alexandre Balotelli =

Brazilian footballer (born 1993)

Personal information
- Full name: Alexandre di Estefano Marcena Rodrigues
- Date of birth: February 5, 1993 (age 33)
- Place of birth: Brazil
- Height: 1.91 m (6 ft 3 in)
- Position: Striker

Team information
- Current team: Customs United
- Number: 99

Senior career*
Years	Team	Apps	(Gls)
2014	Boa Esporte	9	(5)
2014	Ponte Preta		
2014	Atlético Sorocaba		
2015	Boa Esporte	6	(1)
2015	Pelotas		
2016	SC Sagamihara		
2019	Kasetsart	7	(4)
2020	MOF Customs United	3	(1)
2021	Muang Loei United	11	(6)
2021–2022	Krabi	16	(8)
2022–	Customs United	33	(5)
- * Club domestic league appearances and goals as of 27 May 2023

Alexandre Di Estefano Marcena Rodrigues (born February 5, 1993), more commonly known as Alexandre Balotelli, is a Brazilian footballer who plays as a striker for Thai League 2 club Customs United.

== Honours ==
- Thai League 3

(silver) Runners-up : 2021–22

- Thai League 3 Southern Region

(gold) Winners : 2021–22
