= Surachai Chawna =

Thai footballer (born 1998)

Personal information
- Full name: Surachai Chawna
- Date of birth: 14 January 1998 (age 28)
- Place of birth: Khon Kaen, Thailand
- Position: Attacking midfielder

Team information
- Current team: Siwalai
- Number: 42

Senior career*
Years	Team	Apps	(Gls)
2018–2019	Air Force Central	14	(1)
2020	Kasetsart		
2020–2021	Lampang	22	(4)
2021–2022	Sukhothai	2	(0)
2022	Phitsanulok	8	(1)
2022–2024	Khon Kaen	37	(6)
2024–2025	Yasothon	0	(0)
2025-now	Siwalai	0	(0)

International career
- Thailand U21
- * Club domestic league appearances and goals as of 16 May 2025

Surachai Chawna (Thai: สุรชัย ชาวนา; born January 14, 1998) is a Thai professional footballer who plays as an attacking midfielder for Siwalai in the TS Thailand Semi-Pro League.
