= 2021–22 Thai League 3 Southern Region =

Thai League 3 Southern Region
- Season: 2021–22
- Dates: 4 September 2021 – 27 February 2022
- Champions: Krabi
- Relegated: Satun United; Surat Thani
- T3 National Championship: Krabi; Nakhon Si United
- Matches: 156
- Goals: 382 (2.45 per match)
- Top goalscorer: (Brazil) Mairon Natan Pereira Maciel Oliveira (14 goals; Songkhla)
- Best goalkeeper: (Thailand) Wuttichai Panbut (16 clean sheets; Krabi)
- Biggest home win: 9 goals difference Songkhla 10–1 Surat Thani (18 December 2021)
- Biggest away win: 6 goals difference Surat Thani 0–6 Krabi (16 February 2022)
- Highest scoring: 11 goals Songkhla 10–1 Surat Thani (18 December 2021)
- Longest winning run: 6 matches Krabi; Nakhon Si United; Nara United
- Longest unbeaten run: 14 matches Songkhla
- Longest winless run: 24 matches Surat Thani
- Longest losing run: 13 matches Surat Thani
- Highest attendance: 1,851; Songkhla 2–0 Nara United (13 February 2022)
- Lowest attendance: 0
- Total attendance: 35,012
- Average attendance: 381

The 2021–22 Thai League 3 Southern region is a region in the regional stage of the 2021–22 Thai League 3. The tournament was sponsored by Blue Dragon Lottery Online, and known as the Blue Dragon League for sponsorship purposes. A total of 13 teams located in Southern of Thailand will compete in the league of the Southern region.

== Teams ==
=== Number of teams by province ===
Position	Province	Number	Teams
1	Songkhla	2	Songkhla and Young Singh Hatyai United
1	Surat Thani	2	MH Khon Surat City and Surat Thani
2	Krabi	1	Krabi
2	Nakhon Si Thammarat	1	Nakhon Si United
2	Narathiwat	1	Nara United
2	Pattani	1	Pattani
2	Phatthalung	1	Phatthalung
2	Phuket	1	Patong City
2	Satun	1	Satun United
2	Trang	1	Trang
2	Yala	1	Jalor City

=== Stadiums and locations ===
Locations of the 2021–22 Thai League 3 Southern region teams

Team	Location	Stadium	Coordinates
Jalor City	Yala (Mueang)	Jaru Municipality Stadium	6°34′42″N 101°17′52″E
Jalor City	Pattani (Mueang)	Pattani Provincial Stadium (temporary)	6°53′20″N 101°14′41″E
Krabi	Krabi (Mueang)	Krabi Provincial Stadium	8°06′30″N 98°55′00″E
MH Khon Surat City	Surat Thani (Wiang Sa)	Ban Song Municipality Stadium	8°39′43″N 99°22′32″E
Nakhon Si United	Nakhon Si Thammarat (Mueang)	Nakhon Si Thammarat Provincial Stadium	8°27′17″N 99°57′31″E
Nara United	Narathiwat (Mueang)	Narathiwat PAO. Stadium	6°25′39″N 101°48′15″E
Patong City	Phuket (Mueang)	Surakul Stadium	7°53′20″N 98°22′19″E
Pattani	Pattani (Mueang)	Pattani Provincial Stadium	6°53′20″N 101°14′41″E
Phatthalung	Phatthalung (Mueang)	Phatthalung Provincial Stadium	7°37′00″N 100°02′55″E
Satun United	Satun (Mueang)	Satun PAO. Stadium	6°39′05″N 100°04′45″E
Songkhla	Songkhla (Mueang)	Tinsulanon Stadium	7°12′26″N 100°35′55″E
Surat Thani	Surat Thani (Mueang)	Surat Thani Provincial Stadium	9°08′06″N 99°20′50″E
Trang	Trang (Mueang)	Trang Municipality Stadium	7°33′12″N 99°36′57″E
Young Singh Hatyai United	Songkhla (Hatyai)	Southern Major City Stadium	6°55′05″N 100°27′27″E

=== Foreign players ===
A T3 team could register 3 foreign players from foreign players all around the world. A team can use 3 foreign players on the field in each game.

Note :
(substituted off) : players who released during second leg transfer window;
(substituted in) : players who registered during second leg transfer window.

AFC member countries players.
CAF member countries players.
CONCACAF member countries players.
CONMEBOL member countries players.
OFC member countries players.
UEFA member countries players.
No foreign player registered.

Club	Leg	Player 1	Player 2	Player 3
Jalor City	1st
Jalor City	2nd
Krabi	1st	(Argentina) Nicolás Abot (substituted off)	(Egypt) Mohamed Samir (substituted off)	(Ivory Coast) Koné Seydou
Krabi	2nd	(Brazil) Alexandre Balotelli (substituted in)	(Brazil) Romário Reginaldo (substituted in)	(Ivory Coast) Koné Seydou
MH Khon Surat City	1st	(Brazil) Pires Santos Júnior Ricardo (substituted off)	(Mali) Toloba Aremu Kassim Mouyidine	(Togo) Vincent Bossou
MH Khon Surat City	2nd	(Czech Republic) Karsten Ayong (substituted in)	(Mali) Toloba Aremu Kassim Mouyidine	(Togo) Vincent Bossou
Nakhon Si United	1st	(Brazil) Phillerson Natan Silva de Oliveira	(Brazil) Diego Silva	(Brazil) Erivelto
Nakhon Si United	2nd	(Brazil) Phillerson Natan Silva de Oliveira	(Brazil) Diego Silva	(Brazil) Erivelto
Nara United	1st	(The Gambia) Ahmad K. Saidy (substituted off)	(Nigeria) Emmanuel Nwachi	(Japan) Ryohei Maeda
Nara United	2nd		(Nigeria) Emmanuel Nwachi	(Japan) Ryohei Maeda
Patong City	1st
Patong City	2nd
Pattani	1st	(Brazil) Caio Rodrigues da Cruz (substituted off)	(Brazil) Stéfano Yuri (substituted off)	(Brazil) Moreira (substituted off)
Pattani	2nd		(Guinea) Barry Lelouma (substituted in)	(Japan) Koike Akihiro (substituted in)
Phatthalung	1st
Phatthalung	2nd	(France) Jil-Lianh Marie Denjean (substituted in)	(Guinea) Conde Mamoudou (substituted in)	(Madagascar) Guy Hubert (substituted in)
Satun United	1st	(Brazil) Lucas Marques da Silva (substituted off)	(Cameroon) Ngouafack Samuel	(Laos) Mitsada Saitaifah
Satun United	2nd	(Brazil) Caio Rodrigues da Cruz (substituted in)	(Cameroon) Ngouafack Samuel	(Laos) Mitsada Saitaifah
Songkhla	1st	(Brazil) Alberto Moreira Gouvea (substituted off)	(Brazil) Mairon Natan Pereira Maciel Oliveira	(Brazil) Felipe Nunes
Songkhla	2nd	(Japan) Daiki Konomura (substituted in)	(Brazil) Mairon Natan Pereira Maciel Oliveira	(Brazil) Felipe Nunes
Surat Thani	1st	(Ivory Coast) Soumahoro Mafa (substituted off)	(Ivory Coast) Cheick Barou Diaby (substituted off)	(Guinea) Conde Mamoudou (substituted off)
Surat Thani	2nd		(South Africa) Mahodi Nelson (substituted in)	(Uganda) Amadire Denis (substituted in)
Trang	1st		(Egypt) Waleed Adel (substituted off)	(Iran) Sadegh Mohammad
Trang	2nd	(Tonga) AJ Inia (substituted in)	(South Korea) Han Yun-soo (substituted in)	(Iran) Sadegh Mohammad
Young Singh Hatyai United	1st	(Iran) Milad Sasani Nezhad (substituted off)	(Iran) Amirmohammad Karamdar
Young Singh Hatyai United	2nd		(Iran) Amirmohammad Karamdar

== League table ==
=== Standings ===
Pos	Team	Pld	W	D	L	GF	GA	GD	Pts	Qualification or relegation
1	Krabi (C, Q)	24	17	3	4	45	11	+34	54	Qualification to the National Championship stage
2	Nakhon Si United (Q)	24	15	7	2	47	19	+28	52	Qualification to the National Championship stage
3	Songkhla	24	14	6	4	40	18	+22	48	
4	Nara United	24	12	6	6	38	26	+12	42	
5	MH Khon Surat City	24	12	4	8	28	18	+10	40	
6	Trang	24	10	9	5	27	20	+7	39	
7	Jalor City	24	7	11	6	25	30	−5	32	
8	Satun United (R)	24	8	4	12	40	42	−2	28	Relegation to Thailand Amateur League (Note: Satun United administratively relegated to 2023 Thailand Amateur League by FA Thailand decision because of the failure about club licensing.)
9	Young Singh Hatyai United	24	7	6	11	18	23	−5	27	
10	Pattani	24	6	8	10	27	29	−2	26	
11	Patong City	24	5	5	14	18	32	−14	20	
12	Phatthalung	24	5	4	15	19	37	−18	19	
13	Surat Thani (R)	24	0	3	21	10	77	−67	3	Relegation to the Thailand Amateur League

Source: Thai League
Rules for classification: 1) Points; 2) Head-to-head points; 3) Head-to-head goal difference; 4) Head-to-head goal scored; 5) Overall goal difference; 6) Overall goal scored; 7) Fair play points; 8) Play-off without extra time).
(C) Champions; (Q) Qualified for the phase indicated; (R) Relegated

=== Positions by round ===
Team ╲ Round	1	2	3	4	5	6	7	8	9	10	11	12	13	14	15	16	17	18	19	20	21	22	23	24	25	26
Krabi	13	6	7	9	7	5	3	3	3	2	2	2	2	3	4	3	2	1	1	1	1	1	1	1	1	1
Nakhon Si United	1	1	1	1	1	1	1	1	1	1	1	1	1	4	2	4	5	5	5	5	4	3	3	3	2	2
Songkhla	8	4	5	7	8	6	6	4	4	4	4	4	4	2	3	1	1	3	2	2	2	2	2	2	3	3
Nara United	6	10	6	4	2	2	2	2	2	3	3	3	3	1	1	2	3	2	4	3	5	5	5	4	4	4
MH Khon Surat City	9	12	9	6	3	3	4	6	6	6	5	5	5	5	5	5	4	4	3	4	3	4	4	5	5	5
Trang	7	8	4	2	4	7	7	5	5	7	6	6	6	7	7	6	6	6	7	6	6	6	6	6	6	6
Jalor City	2	3	3	5	6	8	8	8	9	8	9	7	7	6	6	7	7	7	6	7	7	7	7	7	7	7
Satun United	5	2	2	3	5	4	5	7	8	9	7	8	8	8	9	8	9	9	8	9	9	9	9	8	8	8
Young Singh Hatyai United	12	11	11	11	10	10	10	10	10	10	10	10	10	11	8	10	11	11	10	8	8	8	8	9	9	9
Pattani	10	9	12	12	11	11	11	11	12	12	11	11	11	9	10	9	8	8	9	10	10	10	10	10	10	10
Patong City	3	7	10	10	12	12	12	12	11	11	12	12	12	12	12	12	12	12	12	12	12	12	12	12	11	11
Phatthalung	4	5	8	8	9	9	9	9	7	5	8	9	9	10	11	11	10	10	11	11	11	11	11	11	12	12
Surat Thani	11	13	13	13	13	13	13	13	13	13	13	13	13	13	13	13	13	13	13	13	13	13	13	13	13	13

Source: Thai League
= Qualification to the National Championship stage; = Relegation to the Thailand Amateur League

=== Results by round ===
Team ╲ Round	1	2	3	4	5	6	7	8	9	10	11	12	13	14	15	16	17	18	19	20	21	22	23	24	25	26
Krabi	L	W	N	L	W	W	W	W	W	W	L	W	D	D	N	W	W	W	W	W	D	W	W	W	W	L
Nakhon Si United	W	W	W	N	W	W	W	D	W	D	D	L	D	L	W	N	D	W	D	D	W	W	W	W	W	W
Songkhla	N	W	D	D	L	W	W	W	D	D	W	W	D	W	D	W	W	W	W	L	W	W	L	W	L	N
Nara United	D	L	W	W	W	W	W	W	N	D	L	W	D	W	W	L	D	W	L	W	N	D	L	W	L	D
MH Khon Surat City	L	L	W	W	W	W	L	L	D	D	W	N	W	W	W	D	W	W	W	L	W	L	L	N	L	D
Trang	D	D	W	W	L	L	W	D	D	N	D	D	W	L	W	W	L	L	D	W	W	N	D	W	W	D
Jalor City	W	W	D	L	L	L	W	N	L	D	D	W	W	W	D	D	D	L	D	N	W	L	D	D	D	D
Satun United	W	W	D	D	N	W	L	L	L	L	W	L	L	L	L	W	N	D	L	D	L	L	W	W	W	L
Young Singh Hatyai United	L	L	D	D	W	L	L	W	L	D	D	D	N	L	W	L	L	L	W	W	D	W	L	L	N	W
Pattani	L	D	L	D	D	N	L	L	D	D	W	L	W	W	L	W	D	N	L	L	L	D	L	D	W	W
Patong City	W	L	L	L	L	L	N	L	W	L	L	L	W	D	L	L	D	L	N	W	L	D	W	L	D	D
Phatthalung	W	N	L	D	D	L	L	W	W	W	L	L	L	N	L	L	D	L	W	L	L	D	L	L	L	L
Surat Thani	L	L	L	D	L	L	L	L	L	D	N	L	L	L	L	L	L	L	L	L	L	L	N	L	L	D

Source: Thai League
N = No match; W = Won; D = Drawn; L = Lost

=== Results ===
Home \ Away	JLC	KBI	MSC	NSU	NRA	PTC	PTN	PLG	STU	SKA	SRT	TRG	YHU
Jalor City	—	0–2	1–1	2–2	2–2	0–0	3–1	2–1	2–1	0–0	1–0	0–0	2–1
Krabi	5–0	—	1–0	0–2	0–1	2–0	3–1	1–0	5–2	1–0	6–0	2–1	1–0
MH Khon Surat City	1–0	1–0	—	1–0	0–1	0–1	0–0	2–1	0–1	1–2	2–0	0–1	3–1
Nakhon Si United	2–0	2–0	3–1	—	2–2	2–1	2–0	2–0	6–3	0–2	3–0	0–0	2–0
Nara United	2–1	0–2	2–0	0–3	—	2–0	1–1	2–0	3–2	2–3	3–0	1–1	2–0
Patong City	0–1	0–0	1–1	2–2	0–4	—	1–0	0–0	3–2	0–1	3–1	0–1	0–1
Pattani	1–1	0–1	0–1	0–2	2–2	2–1	—	0–0	0–1	1–2	6–0	3–2	2–0
Phatthalung	2–0	0–3	0–1	1–3	0–2	2–1	1–1	—	1–2	1–1	3–1	0–2	1–0
Satun United	2–2	1–3	1–2	1–1	3–1	2–1	0–1	5–1	—	0–2	5–1	3–1	0–0
Songkhla	1–1	0–0	0–0	1–2	2–0	3–1	1–0	2–1	2–1	—	10–1	1–1	0–1
Surat Thani	2–2	0–6	1–6	0–2	0–2	0–2	2–3	0–1	1–1	0–2	—	0–2	0–0
Trang	0–0	0–1	0–3	2–2	1–1	1–0	1–1	1–0	2–1	2–0	3–0	—	1–0
Young Singh Hatyai United	1–2	0–0	0–1	0–0	1–0	2–0	1–1	3–2	1–0	1–2	3–0	1–1	—

Source: Thai League
Legend: Blue = home team win; Yellow = draw; Red = away team win.
For upcoming matches, an "a" indicates there is an article about the rivalry between the two participants.
Notes:
- 16 February 2022, Phatthalung didn't come to the game and was forfeited and awarded 2 goals to Nara United.

== Season statistics ==
=== Top scorers ===
As of 27 February 2022.

Rank	Player	Club	Goals
1	(Brazil) Mairon Natan Pereira Maciel Oliveira	Songkhla	14
2	(Thailand) Phuchakhen Chandaeng	Krabi	11
3	(Thailand) Yodwong Misen	Patong City	10
4	(Thailand) Pithak Abdulraman	Jalor City	9
4	(Brazil) Diego Silva	Nakhon Si United	9
4	(Thailand) Thanphisit Hempandan	Satun United	9

=== Hat-tricks ===
Player	For	Against	Result	Date
(Brazil) Diego Silva	Nakhon Si United	MH Khon Surat City	3–1 (H)	12 September 2021
(Thailand) Ibrohem Ardum	Satun United	Trang	3–1 (H)	16 October 2021
(Argentina) Nicolás Abot	Krabi	Surat Thani	6–0 (H)	20 November 2021
(Brazil) Mairon Natan Pereira Maciel Oliveira^{4}	Songkhla	Surat Thani	10–1 (H)	18 December 2021
(Thailand) Peerapat Kantha	Songkhla	Surat Thani	10–1 (H)	18 December 2021
(Thailand) Thanphisit Hempandan	Satun United	Surat Thani	5–1 (H)	25 December 2021
(Nigeria) Emmanuel Nwachi	Nara United	Surat Thani	3–0 (H)	16 January 2022

Notes: ^{4} = Player scored 4 goals; (H) = Home team; (A) = Away team

=== Clean sheets ===
As of 27 February 2022.

Rank	Player	Club	Clean sheets
1	(Thailand) Wuttichai Panbut	Krabi	16
2	(Thailand) Chakhon Philakhlang	Nakhon Si United	10
3	(Thailand) Peradach Bunkame	MH Khon Surat City	9
3	(Thailand) Suntiparp Boonlkilang	Songkhla	9
3	(Thailand) Amran Bungosayu	Young Singh Hatyai United	9
6	(Thailand) Teerapong Puttasukha	Trang	8
7	(Thailand) Phithakphong Chanoum	Nara United	6

== Attendances ==
=== Overall statistical table ===
Pos	Team	Total	High	Low	Average	Change
1	Nara United	2,500	1,500	0	1,250	n/a
2	Songkhla	7,980	1,851	0	798	n/a
3	Nakhon Si United	5,050	1,000	0	721	n/a
4	Krabi	2,516	1,130	0	419	n/a
5	Jalor City	2,478	750	0	413	n/a
6	Pattani	720	400	0	360	n/a
7	Satun United	3,145	450	0	315	n/a
8	Patong City	2,170	420	0	271	n/a
9	Phatthalung	2,300	550	0	256	n/a
10	MH Khon Surat City	1,700	300	0	243	n/a
11	Trang	1,813	328	0	201	n/a
12	Young Singh Hatyai United	1,321	415	0	189	n/a
13	Surat Thani	1,319	300	0	147	n/a
	League total	35,012	1,851	0	381	n/a

Updated to games played on 27 February 2022
Source: Thai League 3

=== Attendances by home match played ===
Team \ Match played	1	2	3	4	5	6	7	8	9	10	11	12	Total
Jalor City	0	0	0	0	357	350	750	570	0	350	0	101	2,478
Krabi	0	0	0	0	0	0	270	176	340	250	350	1,130	2,516
MH Khon Surat City	0	0	0	0	0	200	200	300	250	150	300	300	1,700
Nakhon Si United	0	0	0	0	1,000	1,000	0	350	300	400	1,000	1,000	5,050
Nara United	0	0	0	0	0	0	0	0	1,000	1,500	0	0	2,500
Patong City	0	0	420	0	210	363	254	0	300	200	173	250	2,170
Pattani	0	0	0	0	0	0	0	0	0	400	0	320	720
Phatthalung	0	0	350	200	260	550	200	200	140	100	0	300	2,300
Satun United	0	210	430	364	358	0	105	300	300	328	450	300	3,145
Songkhla	0	0	433	523	953	685	667	701	519	320	1,328	1,851	7,980
Surat Thani	0	0	0	300	240	100	80	200	100	100	184	15	1,319
Trang	0	0	0	215	115	212	200	93	328	250	100	300	1,813
Young Singh Hatyai United	0	0	0	150	150	0	120	415	200	0	100	186	1,321

Source: Thai League

== See also ==
- 2021–22 Thai League 1
- 2021–22 Thai League 2
- 2021–22 Thai League 3
- 2021–22 Thai League 3 Northern Region
- 2021–22 Thai League 3 Northeastern Region
- 2021–22 Thai League 3 Eastern Region
- 2021–22 Thai League 3 Western Region
- 2021–22 Thai League 3 Bangkok Metropolitan Region
- 2021–22 Thai League 3 National Championship
- 2021–22 Thai FA Cup
- 2021–22 Thai League Cup
- 2021 Thailand Champions Cup
