= Bang Mot, Thung Khru =

Bang Mot บางมด
- Khwaeng
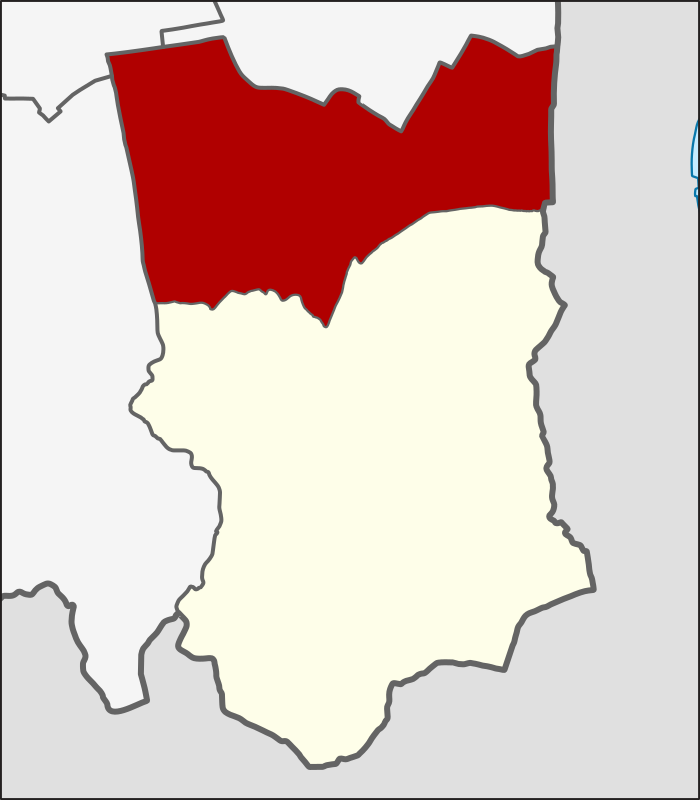
- Location in Thung Khru District
- Country: Thailand
- Province: Bangkok
- Khet: Thung Khru

Area
  - Total: 12.765 km^{2} (4.929 sq mi)

Population (2020)
  - Total: 55,478
- Time zone: UTC+7 (ICT)
- Postal code: 10140
- TIS 1099: 104901

Bang Mot (Thai: บางมด, pronounced [bāːŋ mót]) is a khwaeng (subdistrict) of Thung Khru District, in Bangkok, Thailand. In 2020, it had a total population of 55,478 people.
