= Seksit Srisai =

Thai footballer (born 1992)

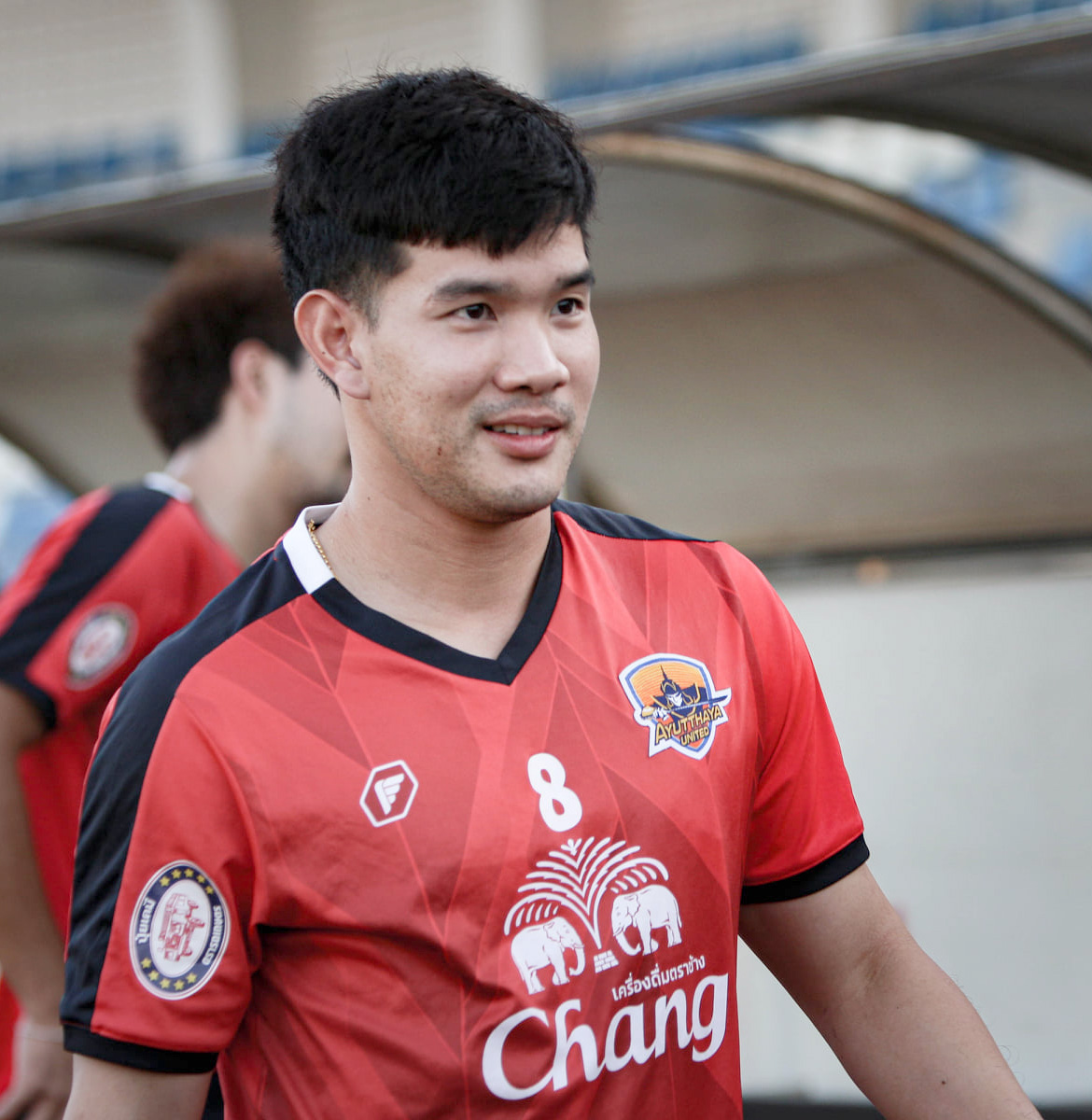

Personal information
- Full name: Seksit Srisai
- Date of birth: 29 August 1992 (age 34)
- Place of birth: Yasothon, Thailand
- Height: 1.70 m (5 ft 7 in)
- Position: Central midfielder

Team information
- Current team: Kasetsart
- Number: 8

Youth career
- 2008–2009: Muangthong United

Senior career*
Years	Team	Apps	(Gls)
2010–2016	Muangthong United	23	(0)
2010–2011	→ Phuket (loan)	33	(5)
2012–2013	→ RSU (loan)	27	(4)
2014	→ TOT (loan)	3	(0)
2017	BEC Tero Sasana	18	(1)
2018	Udon Thani	19	(1)
2019	Trat	7	(0)
2020	Yasothon	2	(0)
2020–2021	Ayutthaya United	24	(1)
2021–2022	Sisaket	26	(13)
2022–2023	Ayutthaya United	27	(1)
2023	Chiangmai	7	(0)
2024–	Kasetsart	0	(0)

International career
2007–2009	Thailand U16		
- * Club domestic league appearances and goals as of 30 April 2024

Seksit Srisai (Thai: เสกสิทธิ์ ศรีใส; born August 29, 1992) is a Thai professional footballer who plays as a central midfielder for Kasetsart in the Thai League 2.

== Honours ==
=== Club ===
Muangthong United

- Thai League 1 (1): 2016
- Thai League Cup (1): 2016
