= 2021–22 Thai League 3 =

5th season of the Thai League 3

- Season: 2021–22
- Dates: 4 September 2021 – 24 April 2022
- Champions: Uthai Thani
- Promoted: Uthai Thani; Krabi; Nakhon Si United
- Relegated: Northern Tak United; Mashare Chaiyaphum; Sakaeo; Royal Thai Fleet; Bang Pa-in Ayutthaya; Satun United; Surat Thani; Grakcu Sai Mai United

The 2021–22 Thai League 3 is the fifth season of the Thai League 3, the third-tier professional league for association football clubs in Thailand, since its establishment in 2017, also known as Blue Dragon League due to the sponsorship deal with Blue Dragon Lottery Online. A total of 75 teams would be divided into 6 regions including 12 teams in the Northern region, 13 teams in the Northeastern region, 12 teams in the Eastern region, 11 teams in the Western region, 13 teams in the Southern region, and 14 teams in the Bangkok metropolitan region.

== Regional stage ==
The number of teams in 6 regions including 12 teams in the Northern region, 13 teams in the Northeastern region, 12 teams in the Eastern region, 11 teams in the Western region, 13 teams in the Southern region, and 14 teams in the Bangkok metropolitan region.

=== Northern region ===
League table

Pos	Team	Pld	W	D	L	GF	GA	GD	Pts	Qualification or relegation
1	Uthai Thani (C, Q)	22	18	2	2	63	11	+52	56	Qualification to the National Championship stage
2	Phitsanulok (Q)	22	11	8	3	28	15	+13	41	Qualification to the National Championship stage
3	Maejo United	22	11	5	6	23	21	+2	38	
4	Wat Bot City	22	8	11	3	26	26	0	35 (Note: Wat Bot City ahead on head-to-head points record; Wat Bot City 4 pts, See Khwae City 1 pt.)	
5	See Khwae City	22	10	5	7	27	23	+4	35	
6	Chiangrai City	22	8	10	4	19	14	+5	34	
7	Uttaradit	22	7	7	8	27	22	+5	28	
8	Nakhon Mae Sot United	22	5	5	12	13	22	−9	20	
9	Kamphaengphet	22	4	7	11	18	35	−17	19	
10	Chiangrai Lanna	22	4	6	12	16	38	−22	18	
11	Nan	22	4	5	13	18	33	−15	17	
12	Northern Tak United (R)	22	3	7	12	16	34	−18	16	Relegation to the Thailand Amateur League

Source: Thai League
Rules for classification: 1) Points; 2) Head-to-head points; 3) Head-to-head goal difference; 4) Head-to-head goal scored; 5) Overall goal difference; 6) Overall goal scored; 7) Fair play points; 8) Play-off without extra time).
(C) Champions; (Q) Qualified for the phase indicated; (R) Relegated

=== Northeastern region ===
League table

Pos	Team	Pld	W	D	L	GF	GA	GD	Pts	Qualification or relegation
1	Muang Loei United (C, Q)	24	18	4	2	59	15	+44	58	Qualification to the National Championship stage
2	Sisaket (Q)	24	17	2	5	52	28	+24	53	Qualification to the National Championship stage
3	Nakhon Ratchasima United	24	15	6	3	43	21	+22	51	
4	Ubon Kruanapat	24	13	3	8	45	25	+20	42	
5	Sisaket United	24	11	7	6	50	30	+20	40	
6	Surin City	24	10	2	12	49	47	+2	32 (Note: The head-to-head points record (mini-league); Surin City 6 pts, Mahasarakham 5 pts (GD -1), Sakon Nakhon 5 pts (GD -2).)	
7	Mahasarakham	24	9	5	10	30	32	−2	32	
8	Sakon Nakhon	24	8	8	8	38	35	+3	32	
9	Yasothon	24	5	12	7	23	30	−7	27	
10	Khon Kaen Mordindang	24	7	4	13	24	45	−21	25 (Note: Khon Kaen Mordindang ahead on head-to-head points record; Khon Kaen Mordindang 6 pts, Udon United 0 pts.)	
11	Udon United	24	6	7	11	27	33	−6	25	
12	Surin Khong Chee Mool	24	1	8	15	22	57	−35	11	
13	Mashare Chaiyaphum (R)	24	0	4	20	12	76	−64	4	Relegation to the Thailand Amateur League

Source: Thai League
Rules for classification: 1) Points; 2) Head-to-head points; 3) Head-to-head goal difference; 4) Head-to-head goal scored; 5) Overall goal difference; 6) Overall goal scored; 7) Fair play points; 8) Play-off without extra time).
(C) Champions; (Q) Qualified for the phase indicated; (R) Relegated

=== Eastern region ===
League table

Pos	Team	Pld	W	D	L	GF	GA	GD	Pts	Qualification or relegation
1	Pattaya Dolphins United (C, Q)	22	16	5	1	62	14	+48	53	Qualification to the National Championship stage
2	Chachoengsao Hi-Tek (Q)	22	13	6	3	34	17	+17	45	Qualification to the National Championship stage
3	Pluakdaeng United	22	12	4	6	29	23	+6	40	
4	Bankhai United	22	10	9	3	37	22	+15	39	
5	Saimit Kabin United	22	10	7	5	34	27	+7	37	
6	Assawin Kohkwang United	22	8	8	6	29	24	+5	32 (Note: Assawin Kohkwang United ahead on head-to-head points record; Assawin Kohkwang United 6 pts, ACDC 0 pts.)	
7	ACDC	22	8	8	6	30	33	−3	32	
8	Chanthaburi	22	4	7	11	28	38	−10	19	
9	Sakaeo (R)	22	4	5	13	18	35	−17	17	Relegation to Thailand Amateur League (Note: Sakaeo administratively relegated to 2023 Thailand Amateur League by FA Thailand decision because of the failure about club licensing.)
10	Banbueng	22	3	7	12	22	38	−16	16	
11	Marines Eureka	22	4	3	15	12	36	−24	15 (Note: The head-to-head record was a tie, Marines Eureka ahead on overall goals difference.)	
12	Royal Thai Fleet (R)	22	4	3	15	21	49	−28	15	Relegation to the Thailand Amateur League

Source: Thai League
Rules for classification: 1) Points; 2) Head-to-head points; 3) Head-to-head goal difference; 4) Head-to-head goal scored; 5) Overall goal difference; 6) Overall goal scored; 7) Fair play points; 8) Play-off without extra time).
(C) Champions; (Q) Qualified for the phase indicated; (R) Relegated

=== Western region ===
League table

Pos	Team	Pld	W	D	L	GF	GA	GD	Pts	Qualification or relegation
1	Saraburi United (C, Q)	20	14	3	3	36	17	+19	45	Qualification to the National Championship stage
2	Pathumthani University (Q)	20	10	9	1	30	13	+17	39	Qualification to the National Championship stage
3	Hua Hin City	20	10	3	7	31	19	+12	33	
4	Kanchanaburi	20	9	4	7	28	29	−1	31	
5	Assumption United	20	8	4	8	28	25	+3	28	
6	Angthong	20	7	6	7	29	22	+7	27	
7	Thawi Watthana Samut Sakhon United	20	8	1	11	22	32	−10	25	
8	Kanjanapat	20	6	3	11	15	22	−7	21	
9	Chainat United	20	3	10	7	17	28	−11	19 (Note: The head-to-head record was a tie, Chainat United ahead on overall goals difference.)	
10	Samut Songkhram	20	5	4	11	17	32	−15	19	
11	Bang Pa-in Ayutthaya (R)	20	5	3	12	17	31	−14	18	Relegation to the Thailand Amateur League

Source: Thai League
Rules for classification: 1) Points; 2) Head-to-head points; 3) Head-to-head goal difference; 4) Head-to-head goal scored; 5) Overall goal difference; 6) Overall goal scored; 7) Fair play points; 8) Play-off without extra time).
(C) Champions; (Q) Qualified for the phase indicated; (R) Relegated

=== Southern region ===
League table

Pos	Team	Pld	W	D	L	GF	GA	GD	Pts	Qualification or relegation
1	Krabi (C, Q)	24	17	3	4	45	11	+34	54	Qualification to the National Championship stage
2	Nakhon Si United (Q)	24	15	7	2	47	19	+28	52	Qualification to the National Championship stage
3	Songkhla	24	14	6	4	40	18	+22	48	
4	Nara United	24	12	6	6	38	26	+12	42	
5	MH Khon Surat City	24	12	4	8	28	18	+10	40	
6	Trang	24	10	9	5	27	20	+7	39	
7	Jalor City	24	7	11	6	25	30	−5	32	
8	Satun United (R)	24	8	4	12	40	42	−2	28	Relegation to Thailand Amateur League (Note: Satun United administratively relegated to 2023 Thailand Amateur League by FA Thailand decision because of the failure about club licensing.)
9	Young Singh Hatyai United	24	7	6	11	18	23	−5	27	
10	Pattani	24	6	8	10	27	29	−2	26	
11	Patong City	24	5	5	14	18	32	−14	20	
12	Phatthalung	24	5	4	15	19	37	−18	19	
13	Surat Thani (R)	24	0	3	21	10	77	−67	3	Relegation to the Thailand Amateur League

Source: Thai League
Rules for classification: 1) Points; 2) Head-to-head points; 3) Head-to-head goal difference; 4) Head-to-head goal scored; 5) Overall goal difference; 6) Overall goal scored; 7) Fair play points; 8) Play-off without extra time).
(C) Champions; (Q) Qualified for the phase indicated; (R) Relegated

=== Bangkok Metropolitan region ===
League table

Pos	Team	Pld	W	D	L	GF	GA	GD	Pts	Qualification or relegation
1	North Bangkok University (C, Q)	26	15	8	3	41	13	+28	53 (Note: North Bangkok University ahead on head-to-head points record; North Bangkok University 4 pts, Bangkok 1 pt.)	Qualification to the National Championship stage
2	Bangkok (Q)	26	15	8	3	55	19	+36	53	Qualification to the National Championship stage
3	Nonthaburi United S.Boonmeerit	26	13	8	5	51	29	+22	47	
4	Chamchuri United	26	12	10	4	44	23	+21	46	
5	Kasem Bundit University	26	12	8	6	35	29	+6	44	
6	Siam	26	8	11	7	26	32	−6	35	
7	Prime Bangkok	26	9	7	10	27	30	−3	34	
8	STK Muangnont	26	8	9	9	29	40	−11	33 (Note: STK Muangnont ahead on head-to-head points record; STK Muangnont 4 pts, Royal Thai Army 1 pt.)	
9	Royal Thai Army	26	7	12	7	24	23	+1	33	
10	Royal Thai Air Force	26	8	7	11	23	30	−7	31	
11	Thonburi United	26	5	13	8	32	33	−1	28	
12	Inter Bangkok	26	3	7	16	16	60	−44	16	
13	Samut Prakan	26	1	12	13	23	38	−15	15 (Note: The head-to-head record was a tie, Samut Prakan ahead on overall goals difference.)	
14	Grakcu Sai Mai United (R)	26	3	6	17	27	54	−27	15	Relegation to the Thailand Amateur League

Source: Thai League
Rules for classification: 1) Points; 2) Head-to-head points; 3) Head-to-head goal difference; 4) Head-to-head goal scored; 5) Overall goal difference; 6) Overall goal scored; 7) Fair play points; 8) Play-off without extra time).
(C) Champions; (Q) Qualified for the phase indicated; (R) Relegated

== National Championship stage ==
The national championship stage is the next stage from the regional stage. 1st and 2nd places of each zone qualified for this stage by being featured in 2 groups. Teams from the Northern, Northeastern, and Eastern regions would have qualified for the upper group. Meanwhile, teams from the Western, Southern, and Bangkok Metropolitan regions would have qualified for the lower group. Winners, runners-ups, and third-placed of the national championship stage would be promoted to the 2022–23 Thai League 2.

=== Group stage ===
Upper region

Pos	Team	Pld	W	D	L	GF	GA	GD	Pts	Qualification	UTT	PLK	PAT	MLU	SKT	CCH
1	Uthai Thani (C, P)	5	4	0	1	14	6	+8	12 (Note: The head-to-head points record (mini-league); Uthai Thani 3 pts (GD +1), Phitsanulok 3 pts (GD 0), Pattaya Dolphins United 3 pts (GD -1).)	Qualification to the final and promotion to the 2022–23 Thai League 2	—	—	4–1	—	6–2	3–1
2	Phitsanulok	5	4	0	1	9	4	+5	12	Qualification to the third place play-off	2–0	—	—	—	—	3–1
3	Pattaya Dolphins United	5	4	0	1	11	8	+3	12		—	2–0	—	2–1	4–3	—
4	Muang Loei United	5	1	0	4	5	7	−2	3 (Note: The head-to-head points record (mini-league); Muang Loei United 3 pts (GD +1), Sisaket 3 pts (GD 0), Chachoengsao Hi-Tek 3 pts (GD -1).)		0–1	0–1	—	—	2–0	—
5	Sisaket	5	1	0	4	8	15	−7	3		—	1–3	—	—	—	2–0
6	Chachoengsao Hi-Tek	5	1	0	4	5	12	−7	3		—	—	0–2	3–2	—	—

Source: Thai League
Rules for classification: 1) Points; 2) Head-to-head points; 3) Goal difference; 4) Goals scored;).
(C) Champions; (P) Promoted
Notes:

Lower region

Pos	Team	Pld	W	D	L	GF	GA	GD	Pts	Qualification	KBI	NSU	NBU	SRU	PTU	BKK
1	Krabi (P)	5	3	1	1	8	6	+2	10	Qualification to the final and promotion to the 2022–23 Thai League 2	—	0–0	2–1	—	—	1–2
2	Nakhon Si United (O, P)	5	2	3	0	9	2	+7	9	Qualification to the third place play-off	—	—	—	—	3–0	5–1
3	North Bangkok University	5	2	2	1	5	2	+3	8 (Note: The head-to-head record was a tie, North Bangkok University ahead on overall goals difference.)		—	0–0	—	0–0	—	3–0
4	Saraburi United	5	2	2	1	6	5	+1	8		2–3	1–1	—	—	2–1	—
5	Pathumthani University	5	1	0	4	6	8	−2	3 (Note: Pathumthani University ahead on head-to-head points record; Pathumthani University 3 pts, Bangkok 0 pts.)		1–2	—	0–1	—	—	—
6	Bangkok	5	1	0	4	3	14	−11	3		—	—	—	0–1	0–4	—

Source: Thai League
Rules for classification: 1) Points; 2) Head-to-head points; 3) Goal difference; 4) Goals scored;).
(O) Play-off winners; (P) Promoted

=== Knockout stage ===
Third place play-off

Team 1	Agg.	Team 2	1st leg	2nd leg
Phitsanulok	3–4	Nakhon Si United	1–1	2–3

Final

Team 1	Agg.	Team 2	1st leg	2nd leg
Uthai Thani	3–1	Krabi	2–0	1–1

== See also ==
- 2021–22 Thai League 1
- 2021–22 Thai League 2
- 2021–22 Thai League 3 Northern Region
- 2021–22 Thai League 3 Northeastern Region
- 2021–22 Thai League 3 Eastern Region
- 2021–22 Thai League 3 Western Region
- 2021–22 Thai League 3 Southern Region
- 2021–22 Thai League 3 Bangkok Metropolitan Region
- 2021–22 Thai League 3 National Championship
- 2021–22 Thai FA Cup
- 2021–22 Thai League Cup
- 2021 Thailand Champions Cup
