= 2022–23 Thai League Cup =

Hilux Revo Cup

Tournament details
- Country: Thailand
- Dates: 3 September 2022 – 20 May 2023
- Teams: 86

Final positions
- Champions: Buriram United (7th title)
- Runners-up: BG Pathum United

Tournament statistics
- Matches played: 75
- Goals scored: 259 (3.45 per match)
- Top goal scorer(s): Apisit Prakhongpan, Boubacar Koné, Bruno Suzuki, Burnel Okana-Stazi, Guntapon Keereeleang, Mohamed Essam, Teerasil Dangda (4 goals)

Awards
- Best player: Goran Čaušić

The 2022–23 Thai League Cup is the 13th season in the second era of a Thailand's knockout football competition. All games are played as a single match. It was sponsored by Toyota Motor Thailand, and known as the Hilux Revo Cup (Thai: ไฮลักซ์ รีโว่ คัพ) for sponsorship purposes, Hilux Revo is a truck model of Toyota. 86 clubs were accepted into the tournament, and it began with the first qualification round on 3 September 2022 and concluded with the final on 20 May 2023. The tournament has been readmitted back into Thai football after a 10-year absence. The prize money for this prestigious award is said to be around 5 million baht and the runners-up will be netting 1 million baht.

This is the first edition of the competition and the qualifying round will be played in regions featuring clubs from the Thai League 3.

== Calendar ==
Round	Date	Matches	Clubs	New entries this round
First qualification round	3–4 September 2022	7	34 → 17	34 2022–23 Thai League 3
Second qualification round	3–21 September 2022	20	17 + 23 → 20	23 2022–23 Thai League 3
Qualification play-off round	19 October 2022	17	20 + 14 → 17	14 2022–23 Thai League 2
First round	16 November 2022	16	17 + 15 → 16	15 2022–23 Thai League 1
Second round	25 January 2023	8	16 → 8	
Quarter-finals	22 February 2023	4	8 → 4	
Semi-finals	26 April 2023	2	4 → 2	
Final	20 May 2023	1	2 → Champions	
Total				86 clubs

== Results ==
Note: T1: Clubs from Thai League 1; T2: Clubs from Thai League 2; T3: Clubs from Thai League 3.

=== First qualification round ===
34 clubs from 2022–23 Thai League 3 have signed to first qualify in the 2022–23 Thai League cup. This round had drawn on 19 August 2022. 53 goals occurred in this round.

Northern region
The qualifying round would be played in the northern region featuring 4 clubs from the 2022–23 Thai League 3 Northern Region.

4 September 2022	Chiangrai Lanna (T3)	2–1	Nakhon Mae Sot United (T3)	Mueang, Chiangrai
15:30 (UTC+7)	Phirawik Thinsuk 22'; Athip Khumma 36'	Report	Aekkalak Suwanruearg 55'	Stadium: Chiangrai Provincial Stadium; Attendance: 55; Referee: Nattawut Pornchaiwirun; Assistant referees: Tulakan Khamthai, Phattharaphon Chaknam-arng; Fourth official: Suchart Kuisue

4 September 2022	Uttaradit Saksiam (T3)	5–1	Kongkrailas United (T3)	Mueang, Uttaradit
15:30 (UTC+7)	Chatchai Narkwijit 49'; Praphas Rattanadee 55'; Apisit Prakhongpan 73', 78', 80'	Report	Sadegh Eskandarikhanghahi 40'	Stadium: Uttaradit Provincial Stadium; Attendance: 255; Referee: Opars Oomsomsuai; Assistant referees: Kittisak Tasurin, Chitchanuphong Ketsana; Fourth official: Jackkrit Meekru

Northeastern region
The qualifying round would be played in the northeastern region featuring 8 clubs from the 2022–23 Thai League 3 Northeastern Region.

3 September 2022	Sisaket United (T3)	2–1	Muang Loei United (T3)	Mueang, Sisaket
17:00 (UTC+7)	Thaweekun Thong-on 15'; Cristian Alex 20'	Report	Diarra Junior Aboubacar 22'	Stadium: Sri Nakhon Lamduan Stadium; Attendance: 503; Referee: Bowornthat Duangkaew; Assistant referees: Tadapong Intan, Jirayu Aotjansri; Fourth official: Phanu Phalhaphon

3 September 2022	Mahasarakham SBT (T3)	0–1	Nakhon Ratchasima United (T3)	Mueang, Mahasarakham
17:00 (UTC+7)		Report	Bouda Henry Ismaël 77'	Stadium: Mahasarakham Provincial Stadium; Attendance: 384; Referee: Uthai Purase; Assistant referees: Sonthaya Parvan, Chinnawat Kottai; Fourth official: Chairat Phooalai

4 September 2022	Udon United (T3)	2–0	Rasisalai United (T3)	Mueang, Udon Thani
15:30 (UTC+7)	Kraiwit Boonlue 17'; Nontawat Wannit 59'	Report		Stadium: Stadium of Thailand National Sports University, Udon Thani Campus; Attendance: 450; Referee: Warakorn Suraporn; Assistant referees: Kitsada Fromthaisong, Nutthawat Kongsuwan; Fourth official: Suparak Nilkad

4 September 2022	Ubon Kruanapat (T3)	2–2 (a.e.t.) (3–4 p)	Surin Khong Chee Mool (T3)	Khueang Nai, Ubon Ratchathani
17:00 (UTC+7)	Oscar Plape 17'; Setthapong Phaowan 88'	Report	Chayapon Udornpan 48', 74'	Stadium: Stadium of Ubon Ratchathani Rajabhat University, Ban Yang Noi Campus; Attendance: 250; Referee: Yodsakorn Pakdeesuwan; Assistant referees: Rutratchapoom Moolpong, Sittisak Kaewkam; Fourth official: Samart Kaikaew
	Penalties
	Jakree Burapha (penalty scored); Oscar Plape (penalty scored); Manaschai Faktae (penalty scored); Wachirawut Phudithip (penalty missed); Phitakpong Chaiyapho (penalty missed)		(penalty scored) Athiwat Srisuwan; (penalty scored) Kroekrit Rodmueang; (penalty scored) Heman Kittiamphaipruek; (penalty scored) Atichat Khamma

Eastern region
The qualifying round would be played in the eastern region featuring 2 clubs from the 2022–23 Thai League 3 Eastern Region.

4 September 2022	Pluakdaeng United (T3)	2–0	Pattaya Dolphins United (T3)	Pluakdaeng, Rayong
15:30 (UTC+7)	Chalermsak Kaewsooktae 37'; Mohamed Samir 81'	Report		Stadium: CK Stadium; Attendance: 325; Referee: Somsuk Poosomnuek; Assistant referees: Wararit Suwanjira, Narit Mungtoemklang; Fourth official: Pornthep Promsopa

Western region
The qualifying round would be played in the western region featuring 4 clubs from the 2022–23 Thai League 3 Western Region.

4 September 2022	Lopburi City (T3)	3–2	Hua Hin City (T3)	Mueang, Lopburi
15:30 (UTC+7)	Apinan Waengwan 16'; Wisarut Pannasri 66'; Ahmadou Tidjani 90+1'	Report	Phongsakon Sangkasopha 23'; Ndiogou Ba 59'	Stadium: Phra Ramesuan Stadium; Attendance: 325; Referee: Winai Riangwong; Assistant referees: Adisak Thongmaha, Narapat Nittayachat; Fourth official: Arun Budtasee

4 September 2022	Pathumthani University (T3)	2–1	Kanchanaburi City (T3)	Bang Sai, Ayutthaya
15:30 (UTC+7)	Alexis Vaiani 58'; Giuberty Silva Neves 72'	Report	Thanakan Khansen 85'	Stadium: Ratchakram Stadium; Attendance: 200; Referee: Yuttana Sadkrathok; Assistant referees: Weeraphong Chaiyasuk, Ladda Yutiputi; Fourth official: Ratthakhet Puttasorn

Southern region
The qualifying round would be played in the southern region featuring 8 clubs from the 2022–23 Thai League 3 Southern Region.

3 September 2022	Trang (T3)	1–6	MH Nakhon Si City (T3)	Ron Phibun, Nakhon Si Thammarat
15:30 (UTC+7)	Yushi Kawaguchi 49'	Report	Thanawut Klinsukon 3'; Ryo Tomigahara 25', 45'; Boubacar Koné 41', 60'; André Luís 51'	Stadium: Nakhon Si Thammarat PAO. Stadium; Referee: Nattapon Ninlawan; Assistant referees: Wisarut Damthaklong, Tanakorn Tala; Fourth official: Wilat Arunrat

3 September 2022	Pattani (T3)	1–0	Mueang Kon D United (T3)	Mueang, Pattani
17:00 (UTC+7)	Pithak Abdulraman 51'	Report		Stadium: Pattani Provincial Stadium; Attendance: 25,820; Referee: Manop Lempan; Assistant referees: Mayunai Kueteh, Sukarnai Beraheng; Fourth official: Vorawit Promsangkaha

4 September 2022	Young Singh Hatyai United (T3)	1–0	Phuket Andaman (T3)	Mueang, Songkhla
15:30 (UTC+7)	Teerawat Durnee 48'	Report		Stadium: Tinsulanon Stadium; Attendance: 120; Referee: Watcharin Nootong; Assistant referees: Montree Yeereem, Ameen Puteh; Fourth official: Isree Bueraheng

4 September 2022	Phatthalung (T3)	1–0 (a.e.t.)	Jalor City (T3)	Mueang, Phatthalung
17:00 (UTC+7)	Leonardo Martín Ferrari 96'	Report		Stadium: Phatthalung Provincial Stadium; Attendance: 200; Referee: Nirut Suetrong; Assistant referees: Kodchakon Chumjai, Panuwat Chumming; Fourth official: Samran Phaysam

Bangkok metropolitan region
The qualifying round would be played in the Bangkok metropolitan region featuring 8 clubs from the 2022–23 Thai League 3 Bangkok Metropolitan Region.

3 September 2022	Samut Sakhon City (T3)	2–2 (a.e.t.) (2–3 p)	Kasem Bundit University (T3)	Thawi Watthana, Bangkok
15:30 (UTC+7)	Piyadanai Prasert 73'; Kittiphan Jaingam 90+5'	Report	Ma Ye-sung 87' (pen.), 90+5' (pen.)	Stadium: Stadium of Bangkok Thonburi University; Attendance: 230; Referee: Kriangkrai Thiphanunjarukorn; Assistant referees: Tibeth Longtree, Haroot Himbenmut; Fourth official: Danai Yommool
	Penalties
	Bireme Diouf (penalty scored); Veerapat Mekhumrai (penalty scored); Piyadanai Prasert (penalty missed); Suradech Klankham (penalty missed)		(penalty scored) Sakolwat Skollah; (penalty missed) Chaiyasan Homboon; (penalty scored) Sivakorn Majitt; (penalty scored) Ma Ye-sung

3 September 2022	Samut Prakan (T3)	2–1	Thonburi United (T3)	Bang Sao Thong, Samut Prakan
15:30 (UTC+7)	Guntapon Keereeleang 25' (pen.); Kritsanapol Booncharee 90'	Report	Mammad Guliyev 47'	Stadium: Samut Prakan Stadium; Attendance: 170; Referee: Pichit Thongjanmoon; Assistant referees: Pathompong Anunluksanakul, Ukrit Bung-or; Fourth official: Dassakhon Hokla

4 September 2022	Siam (T3)	1–0	AUU Inter Bangkok (T3)	Minburi, Bangkok
15:30 (UTC+7)	Sarfo Otis Adjei 36'	Report		Stadium: 72nd Anniversary Stadium, Minburi; Referee: Thapana Thaworn; Assistant referees: Anucha Kaewpasit, Sujin Rodart; Fourth official: Suthipong Teekhasuk

4 September 2022	Bangkok (T3)	5–1	STK Muangnont (T3)	Thung Khru, Bangkok
17:00 (UTC+7)	Bruno Suzuki 10', 51', 88'; Siwa Prommas 31' (pen.); Padungsak Phothinak 90+2'	Report	Somkaet Kunmee 21'	Stadium: 72nd Anniversary Stadium, Bang Mot; Attendance: 200; Referee: Niruch Panjontuk; Assistant referees: Waranon Soonsuwan, Theerapon Nonthakhamjan; Fourth official: Poomnapat Athan

=== Second qualification round ===
The second qualifying round would be featured 17 clubs that were the winners of the first qualification round and the new entries that were 23 clubs from the 2022–23 Thai League 3. 69 goals occurred in this round.

Northern region
The qualifying round would be played in the northern region featuring 6 clubs from the 2022–23 Thai League 3 Northern Region.

3 September 2022	Kamphaengphet (T3)	1–2	Wat Bot City (T3)	Mueang, Kamphaengphet
15:30 (UTC+7)	Khwanchai Bunprakhom 44'	Report	Diarrassouba Hamed de Silci 18'; Anucha Phantong 50'	Stadium: Kamphaengphet PAO. Stadium; Referee: Teerawat Uma; Assistant referees: Teerapong Oma, Adison Peungsatit; Fourth official: Doungkaew Doungtawan

3 September 2022	Phitsanulok (T3)	2–0	See Khwae City (T3)	Mueang, Phitsanulok
18:00 (UTC+7)	Mairon Natan Pereira Maciel Oliveira 16', 87'	Report		Stadium: Phitsanulok PAO. Stadium; Attendance: 640; Referee: Thanison Onjiw; Assistant referees: Panuwat Khutjaiwong, Suthipong Ontuwong; Fourth official: Chalit Ploypech

21 September 2022	Chiangrai Lanna (T3)	1–5	Uttaradit Saksiam (T3)	Mueang, Chiangrai
15:30 (UTC+7)	Phonchai Khamluang 7'	Report	Chanapong Foenta 14'; Phufah Chuenkomrak 22'; Phontakorn Thosanthiah 34'; Apisit Prakhongpan 44'; Sarun Chottum 69'	Stadium: Chiangrai Provincial Stadium; Attendance: 200; Referee: Supat Chaingam; Assistant referees: Suthipong Ontuwong, Saksit Jantain; Fourth official: Jackkrit Meekru

Northeastern region
The qualifying round would be played in the northeastern region featuring 6 clubs from the 2022–23 Thai League 3 Northeastern Region.

4 September 2022	Khon Kaen (T3)	0–1	Khon Kaen Mordindang (T3)	Mueang, Khon Kaen
18:00 (UTC+7)		Report	Tanapol Srithong 40'	Stadium: Khon Kaen PAO. Stadium; Attendance: 580; Referee: Jarin Yawapee; Assistant referees: Patcharapong Kanbanjong, Athasit Kaewhiang; Fourth official: Phattaradanai Jaisue

21 September 2022	Udon United (T3)	3–0	Surin Khong Chee Mool (T3)	Mueang, Udon Thani
15:30 (UTC+7)	Pongsaton Manonthong 19' (o.g.); Ranieri Luiz Barbosa 75', 82' (pen.)	Report		Stadium: Stadium of Thailand National Sports University, Udon Thani Campus; Referee: Anan Amatsobat; Assistant referees: Kanoksak Khiaodaeng, Sarawut Dassada; Fourth official: Chaisiri Sonnam

21 September 2022	Sisaket United (T3)	6–0	Nakhon Ratchasima United (T3)	Mueang, Sisaket
17:00 (UTC+7)	Thaweekun Thong-on 24'; Nitipat Kansorn 46', 50'; Baphit Chooklin 48'; Watchara chanthai 69'; Osvaldo Nascimento dos Santos Neto 88'	Report		Stadium: Sri Nakhon Lamduan Stadium; Attendance: 459; Referee: Yodsakorn Pakdeesuwan; Assistant referees: Narinnart Tiamskun, Waratchanon Chombun; Fourth official: Saharat Juktirit

Eastern region
The qualifying round would be played in the eastern region featuring 10 clubs from the 2022–23 Thai League 3 Eastern Region.

3 September 2022	Saimit Kabin United (T3)	1–1 (a.e.t.) (2–3 p)	Chanthaburi (T3)	Kabinburi, Prachinburi
15:30 (UTC+7)	Pichit Jaibun 37'	Report	Charin Boodhad 88'	Stadium: Nomklao Maharat Stadium; Attendance: 130; Referee: Pongsakorn Wisitsri; Assistant referees: Chaiwat Rupsa-at, Kodcharat Rattanachot; Fourth official: Theerapon Nakthong
	Penalties
	Aiyarat Duangmanee (penalty missed); Victor Clemente de Oliveira (penalty scored); Terdsak Samat (penalty scored); Jaturong Pimkoon (penalty missed)		(penalty scored) Luan Pereira dos Santos; (penalty scored) Thanadon Supaphon; (penalty scored) Charin Boodhad; (penalty missed) Nattapol Hothong

3 September 2022	Assawin Kohkwang United (T3)	1–2	Navy (T3)	Mueang, Chanthaburi
15:30 (UTC+7)	Khongrit Bornay 27'	Report	Apiwat Sangsanguan 49', 73'	Stadium: Stadium of Rambhai Barni Rajabhat University; Attendance: 100; Referee: Kamphol Kaewsaard; Assistant referees: Samroeng Kamruang, Theerayut Radarit; Fourth official: Palathip Homwarn

3 September 2022	Bankhai United (T3)	2–0	Marines (T3)	Bankhai, Rayong
15:30 (UTC+7)	Vinícius Henrique Benedito da Silva 79'; Watcharin Pinairam 84'	Report		Stadium: Wai Krong Stadium; Referee: Nararit Srivorakul; Assistant referees: Wararit Suwanjira, Puttipong Saensarn; Fourth official: Suchat Fangmala

4 September 2022	Banbueng (T3)	0–1	Chachoengsao Hi-Tek (T3)	Banbueng, Chonburi
15:30 (UTC+7)		Report	Sarawut Choenchai 62'	Stadium: Chang Football Park Stadium; Attendance: 145; Referee: Suksan Thongkoed; Assistant referees: Poomin Lanamtaing, Siravich Konngam; Fourth official: Thawatchai Sangsanit

21 September 2022	Pluakdaeng United (T3)	5–2	ACDC (T3)	Pluakdaeng, Rayong
15:30 (UTC+7)	Anusorn Sricaloung 13', 63'; Eiman Kaabi 20'; Sirisak Foofung 57'; Warut Trongkratok 80'	Report	Chusana Numkanitsorn 78'; Apisit Nonkrathok 82'	Stadium: CK Stadium; Attendance: 120; Referee: Kamphol Kaewsaard; Assistant referees: Chaiwat Rupsa-at, Kodcharat Rattanachot; Fourth official: Panya Nawasimainam

Western region
The qualifying round would be played in the western region featuring 6 clubs from the 2022–23 Thai League 3 Western Region.

3 September 2022	Samut Songkhram (T3)	3–0	Kanjanapat (T3)	Mueang, Samut Songkhram
15:30 (UTC+7)	Jhonatan Bernardo 35'; Mohammadreza Rokni 49'; Suphawit Chusaksakunviboon 90+1'	Report		Stadium: Samut Songkhram PAO. Stadium; Attendance: 104; Referee: Virittpol Pluemsilp; Assistant referees: Tawan Suriyawong, Pichaya Kasem; Fourth official: Natipong Aiemso

3 September 2022	Thawi Watthana Samut Sakhon United (T3)	0–6	Dragon Pathumwan Kanchanaburi (T3)	Mueang, Samut Sakhon
15:30 (UTC+7)		Report	Anusorn Phrmprasit 4'; Taiga Matsunaga 36'; Athatcha Rahongthong 45+2'; Sirichai Lamphuttha 70', 78'; Anuluk Yeunhan 83'	Stadium: Stadium of Thailand National Sports University, Samut Sakhon Campus; Attendance: 250; Referee: Kittichai Huthip; Assistant referees: Nattphon Chuensamran, Chinnaphat Wiriyarojsakul; Fourth official: Saravut Suksalee

21 September 2022	Lopburi City (T3)	3–2	Pathumthani University (T3)	Mueang, Lopburi
15:30 (UTC+7)	Krismy Seungtrakoolchai 43', 85'; Ahmadou Tidjani 90+6'	Report	Adunlikhit Saengdaeng 14' (o.g.); Giuberty Silva Neves 90+1'	Stadium: Phra Ramesuan Stadium; Attendance: 97; Referee: Kittichai Huthip; Assistant referees: Kittichok Huthip, Patcharapon Losomsup; Fourth official: Narapat Nittayachat

Southern region
The qualifying round would be played in the southern region featuring 6 clubs from the 2022–23 Thai League 3 Southern Region.

4 September 2022	Muang Trang United (T3)	0–1	Songkhla (T3)	Mueang, Trang
15:30 (UTC+7)		Report	Adisak Ganu 89'	Stadium: Trang Municipality Stadium; Attendance: 1,395; Referee: Apirat Kreeso; Assistant referees: Akit Do, Chawalit Chaikaew; Fourth official: Anas Poheng

21 September 2022	MH Nakhon Si City (T3)	3–1 (a.e.t.)	Pattani (T3)	Tha Sala, Nakhon Si Thammarat
15:30 (UTC+7)	Boubacar Koné 83', 120+3'; Somsak Musikaphan 99' (pen.)	Report	Waesakariya Toka 48'	Stadium: Stadium of Walailak University; Attendance: 500; Referee: Wichai Pannil; Assistant referees: Heesham Doloh, Charin Kalamad; Fourth official: Danusorn Boondej

21 September 2022	Young Singh Hatyai United (T3)	2–2 (a.e.t.) (4–1 p)	Phatthalung (T3)	Hatyai, Songkhla
16:00 (UTC+7)	Ekue Andre Houma 13'; Khunnaphon Udomsin 44'	Report	Apiwat Hongtong 35'; Alimamy Haïdara Chérif 90+5' (pen.)	Stadium: Chira Nakhon Stadium; Attendance: 101; Referee: Pissanusak Sriyai; Assistant referees: Mayunai Kueteh, Metawin Chujit; Fourth official: Tiwakorn Sawangpong
	Penalties
	Mitsada Saitaifah (penalty scored); Adam Lassamano (penalty scored); Kasem Musikachai (penalty scored); Faiso Chemoh (penalty scored)		(penalty scored) Alimamy Haïdara Chérif; (penalty missed) Leonardo Martín Ferrari; (penalty missed) Kroekphon Phondongnok

Bangkok metropolitan region
The qualifying round would be played in the Bangkok metropolitan region featuring 6 clubs from the 2022–23 Thai League 3 Bangkok Metropolitan Region.

3 September 2022	Nonthaburi United S.Boonmeerit (T3)	2–1	Prime Bangkok (T3)	Bangyai, Nonthaburi
15:30 (UTC+7)	Carlos Eduardo dos Santos Lima 48', 73'	Report	Poppol Zeemadee 69'	Stadium: Nonthaburi Provincial Stadium; Attendance: 200; Referee: Trin Sahachaipat; Assistant referees: Kiadtisak Janmol, Kunach Sanggoranee; Fourth official: Aidsara Gaedthai

21 September 2022	Kasem Bundit University (T3)	1–2	Samut Prakan (T3)	Minburi, Bangkok
15:30 (UTC+7)	Pongchakorn Nontanum 59'	Report	Shim Gwang-uk 18'; Guntapon Keereeleang 82'	Stadium: Stadium of Kasem Bundit University; Attendance: 150; Referee: Trin Sahachaipat; Assistant referees: Thanakrit Klapwun, Niwet Mala; Fourth official: Pongtut Ananta-art

21 September 2022	Siam (T3)	1–3	Bangkok (T3)	Minburi, Bangkok
15:30 (UTC+7)	Sarfo Otis Adjei 39'	Report	Shawn Sadayu Richardson 4'; Wirayut Chaemcharoen 11' (o.g.); Chatrawee Kaewniam 69' (pen.)	Stadium: 72nd Anniversary Stadium, Minburi; Attendance: 55; Referee: Dassakhon Hokla; Assistant referees: Ukrit Bung-or, Phattarapon Racha; Fourth official: Chanin Sornsuda

=== Qualification play-off round ===
The qualification play-off round would be featured 20 clubs that were the winners of the second qualification round and the new entries that were 14 clubs from the 2022–23 Thai League 2. This round had drawn on 28 September 2022. 60 goals occurred in this round.

19 October 2022	Dragon Pathumwan Kanchanaburi (T3)	2–1	Suphanburi (T2)	Mueang, Kanchanaburi
15:00 (UTC+7)	Nattapong Kumnaet 7'; Taiga Matsunaga 9'	Report	Nethithorn Kaewcharoen 22'	Stadium: Kanchanaburi Municipality Stadium; Attendance: 186; Referee: Boonsong Prachumrak; Assistant referees: Suriya Lee-intr, Thanet Jairaw; Fourth official: Virittpol Pluemsilp

19 October 2022	Lopburi City (T3)	2–1	Songkhla (T3)	Mueang, Lopburi
15:00 (UTC+7)	Ahmadou Tidjani 15'; Peerapol Wattanajinda 41'	Report	Sihanart Suttisak 67'	Stadium: Phra Ramesuan Stadium; Attendance: 215; Referee: Nasri Tamat; Assistant referees: Amnuay Phoeysiri, Nattphon Chuensamran; Fourth official: Sasina Thongkham

19 October 2022	Young Singh Hatyai United (T3)	3–3 (a.e.t.) (5–3 p)	Chainat Hornbill (T2)	Hatyai, Songkhla
15:00 (UTC+7)	Burnel Okana-Stazi 53', 99', 109'	Report	Diego Silva 29'; Fittaree Khadearee 95'; Kim Byung-oh 105'	Stadium: Chira Nakhon Stadium; Attendance: 116; Referee: Sapuding Kalong; Assistant referees: Hanyot Buangrab, Phitsanu Chusi; Fourth official: Anwa Hayiyusoh
	Penalties
	Pornthep Heemla (penalty scored); Chairat Madsiri (penalty scored); Thanakon Sathanphong (penalty scored); Taveechai Kliangklao (penalty scored); Burnel Okana-Stazi (penalty scored)		(penalty missed) Atsadayut Pholbua; (penalty scored) Choe Ho-Ju; (penalty scored) Kim Byung-oh; (penalty scored) Jedsadakron Promkhot

19 October 2022	Uttaradit Saksiam (T3)	0–2	Chiangmai (T2)	Mueang, Uttaradit
15:00 (UTC+7)		Report	Tawan Khotrsupho 57'; Amornthep Maundee 70'	Stadium: Uttaradit Provincial Stadium; Attendance: 306; Referee: Samrit Ritkaew; Assistant referees: Worapong Prasartsri, Thanapon Kanchanaudom; Fourth official: Direk Kaort

19 October 2022	Khon Kaen Mordindang (T3)	1–5	Udon Thani (T2)	Mueang, Khon Kaen
15:00 (UTC+7)	Patcharaphol Prutsakarn 44'	Report	Apiwit Samurmuen 12'; Supoat Lertpalapong 35'; Phakhinai Nammichai 56'; Greg Houla 77', 82'	Stadium: Stadium of Khon Kaen University; Attendance: 200; Referee: Manut Pimol; Assistant referees: Narong Hansuk, Maitree Nuengkhammee; Fourth official: Amnat Makklang

19 October 2022	Wat Bot City (T3)	1–3	Rayong (T2)	Wat Bot, Phitsanulok
15:00 (UTC+7)	Milad Sasani Nezhad 90+4' (pen.)	Report	Anto Okamura 75', 90+2'; Lwin Moe Aung 84'	Stadium: H2H Sport Stadium; Attendance: 56; Referee: Peerasan Krataithong; Assistant referees: Songrit Trakulchai, Natthawut Tasmak; Fourth official: Wathanyu Morin

19 October 2022	MH Nakhon Si City (T3)	3–2	Udon United (T3)	Tha Sala, Nakhon Si Thammarat
15:00 (UTC+7)	Sanan Samala 8'; Somsak Musikaphan 29'; André Luís 45+1'	Report	Panupong Phuakphralap 66'; Ranieri Luiz Barbosa 78'	Stadium: Stadium of Walailak University; Attendance: 600; Referee: Pissanusak Sriyai; Assistant referees: Mayunai Kueteh, Khusaifi Awae; Fourth official: Artit Srinoy

19 October 2022	Samut Songkhram (T3)	2–0 (awd.)	Krabi (T2)	Mueang, Samut Sakhon
15:00 (UTC+7)	Suppasek Kaikaew 56'; Raphael de Oliveira Manhães 66'	Report	Surin Ra-ob 17'; Jean Moser 71'; Chigozie Mbah 103'	Stadium: Stadium of Thailand National Sports University, Samut Sakhon Campus; Attendance: 100; Referee: Satchukorn Saenchu; Assistant referees: Pattarapong Kijsathit, Nissan Janthep; Fourth official: Yuttana Sadkrathok

19 October 2022	Chanthaburi (T3)	1–3	Customs United (T2)	Mueang, Chanthaburi
15:00 (UTC+7)	Yannarit Sukcharoen 43'	Report	Wasan Mala 86' (o.g.); Alexandre Balotelli 89' (pen.); Pheemphapob Viriyachanchai 90+1'	Stadium: Chanthaburi Provincial Stadium; Attendance: 145; Referee: Ekkachai Phetcham; Assistant referees: Chaiyos Sripak, Kantrakorn Ngaosri; Fourth official: Somsuk Poosomnuek

19 October 2022	Pluakdaeng United (T3)	0–1 (a.e.t.)	Chiangmai United (T2)	Pluakdaeng, Rayong
15:00 (UTC+7)		Report	Aphiwat Hanchai 110'	Stadium: CK Stadium; Attendance: 225; Referee: Suriyo Kanhachalee; Assistant referees: Jagkrit Kaenkaew, Sahatnet Deemongkol; Fourth official: Suchat Fangmala

19 October 2022	Nonthaburi United S.Boonmeerit (T3)	0–1 (a.e.t.)	Ayutthaya United (T2)	Bang Yai, Nonthaburi
17:00 (UTC+7)		Report	Kabfah Boonmatoon 120+1'	Stadium: Nonthaburi Provincial Stadium; Attendance: 137; Referee: Komgrit Ponpasit; Assistant referees: Siwat Chaithong, Kattiya Saphu; Fourth official: Chaikrit Inboonsong

19 October 2022	Sisaket United (T3)	1–1 (a.e.t.) (5–3 p)	Nakhon Si United (T2)	Mueang, Sisaket
17:00 (UTC+7)	Phattharapong Phengchaem 34'	Report	Nattapoom Maya 81'	Stadium: Sri Nakhon Lamduan Stadium; Attendance: 328; Referee: Natthwut Nammuang; Assistant referees: Nattapong Wadweangcom, Manuschai Chawong; Fourth official: Vitsawa Nanchana
	Penalties
	Osvaldo Nascimento dos Santos Neto (penalty scored); Cristian Alex (penalty scored); Nonthawat Chaotai (penalty scored); Suphaphon Sutthisak (penalty scored); Romario Reginaldo Alves (penalty scored)		(penalty scored) Weerawut Kayem; (penalty scored) Apiwat Pengprakon; (penalty scored) Wasan Samarnsin; (penalty missed) Apdussalam Saman

19 October 2022	Bangkok (T3)	4–3	Samut Prakan City (T2)	Thung Khru, Bangkok
17:00 (UTC+7)	Dauda Bortu 36'; Padungsak Phothinak 71', 85'; Bruno Suzuki 87'	Report	Petru Leucă 2', 8'; Sho Shimoji 80'	Stadium: 72nd Anniversary Stadium, Bang Mot; Attendance: 350; Referee: Kristin Saisombat; Assistant referees: Chaowalit Poonprasit, Khomchalach Lekhawijit; Fourth official: Pichit Thongjanmoon

19 October 2022	Phitsanulok (T3)	3–2	Samut Prakan (T3)	Mueang, Phitsanulok
18:00 (UTC+7)	Gilberto Macena 53', 90+1' (pen.); Nicolás Vélez 61' (pen.)	Report	Guntapon Keereeleang 4', 14'	Stadium: Phitsanulok PAO. Stadium; Attendance: 664; Referee: Sirikron Lorboon; Assistant referees: Puttipong Wandee, Teerapong Oma; Fourth official: Teerawat Uma

19 October 2022	Chachoengsao Hi-Tek (T3)	2–3	Nakhon Pathom United (T2)	Mueang, Chachoengsao
18:00 (UTC+7)	Kanchai Tor Wattanaphol 58'; Sarawut Choenchai 90+6'	Report	Mohamed Essam 11', 19', 20'	Stadium: Chachoengsao Municipality Stadium; Attendance: 400; Referee: Putthipong Issising; Assistant referees: Kriangsak Pimsanit, Poramin Yoopensuk; Fourth official: Kriangkrai Thiphanunjarukorn

19 October 2022	Navy (T3)	0–0 (a.e.t.) (3–5 p)	Uthai Thani (T2)	Sattahip, Chonburi
18:00 (UTC+7)		Report		Stadium: Sattahip Navy Stadium; Attendance: 52; Referee: Wichate Tainthong; Assistant referees: Watcharasak Intharak, Pakorn Srichumsin; Fourth official: Pongthep Raipimai
	Penalties
	Yang Ju-hun (penalty scored); Park Ji-hwan (penalty missed); Allan Machado de Souza Rosa (penalty scored); Warutchet Boonchuailuea (penalty scored)		(penalty scored) Muhammadnasay Kolaeh; (penalty scored) Phattharaphon Junsuwan; (penalty scored) Kento Nagasaki; (penalty scored) Kitsada Otata; (penalty scored) Adefolarin Durosinmi

19 October 2022	Bankhai United (T3)	0–1	Rajpracha (T2)	Bankhai, Rayong
18:00 (UTC+7)		Report	Ibrahim Konaré 53'	Stadium: Wai Krong Stadium; Attendance: 110; Referee: Peeratat Kittikanmetee; Assistant referees: Anucha Pinamon, Sarayut Sriampri; Fourth official: Poomnapat Athan

=== First round ===
The first round would be featured 17 clubs that were the winners of the qualification play-off round including 9 clubs from T2 and 8 clubs from T3 and the new entries that were 15 clubs from the 2022–23 Thai League 1. This round had drawn on 26 October 2022. 37 goals occurred in this round.

16 November 2022	Lopburi City (T3)	0–2	Khon Kaen United (T1)	Mueang, Lopburi
15:00 (UTC+7)		Report; Highlight	Niphitpon Hadchan 10'; Wildson Silva de Melo 58'	Stadium: Phra Ramesuan Stadium; Attendance: 312; Referee: Kristin Saisombat; Assistant referees: Poonsawat Samransuk, Chaiya Sripak; Fourth official: Suriyo Kanhachalee

16 November 2022	Samut Songkhram (T3)	1–0	Port (T1)	Mueang, Samut Songkhram
15:00 (UTC+7)	Muhamadasman Satoh 85'	Report; Highlight		Stadium: Samut Songkhram PAO. Stadium; Attendance: 330; Referee: Anusorn Nookaew; Assistant referees: Narin Wongprapipak, Phariwat Phoyoo; Fourth official: Veeraporn Maophaeo

16 November 2022	Dragon Pathumwan Kanchanaburi (T3)	2–1	Police Tero (T1)	Mueang, Kanchanaburi
15:00 (UTC+7)	Sergei Tumasyan 4'; Anuluk Yeunhan 52'	Report; Highlight	Settawut Wongsai 71'	Stadium: Kanchanaburi Municipality Stadium; Attendance: 405; Referee: Alongkorn Khonwai; Assistant referees: Chotrawee Tongduang, Srisuwan Boonnum; Fourth official: Pawara Seejen

16 November 2022	Phitsanulok (T3)	4–2 (a.e.t.)	Young Singh Hatyai United (T3)	Mueang, Phitsanulok
16:00 (UTC+7)	Nicolás Vélez 87', 89'; Jeerachai Ladadok 110'; Mairon Natan Pereira Maciel Oliveira 118' (pen.)	Report; Highlight	Burnel Okana-Stazi 33'; Chaiwat Ritthisak 79'	Stadium: Phitsanulok PAO. Stadium; Attendance: 380; Referee: Nattawut Pornchaiwirun; Assistant referees: Suwit Kongtongnok, Phattharaphon Chaknam-arng; Fourth official: Tanyathon Phetch-udom

16 November 2022	Rajpracha (T2)	1–2	Lampang (T1)	Bang Yai, Nonthaburi
16:00 (UTC+7)	Ibrahim Konaré 2'	Report; Highlight	Deyvison Fernandes de Oliveira Silvério 27' (pen.); Yodsawat Montha 55'	Stadium: Nonthaburi Provincial Stadium; Attendance: 154; Referee: Songkran Bunmeekiart; Assistant referees: Watthana Chonchanakul, Tuwae-yusoh Kuji; Fourth official: Komgrit Ponpasit

16 November 2022	Sisaket United (T3)	0–2	Muangthong United (T1)	Mueang, Sisaket
16:00 (UTC+7)		Report; Highlight	Henri Anier 8'; Ekanit Panya 90+3'	Stadium: Sri Nakhon Lamduan Stadium; Attendance: 3,464; Referee: Sahapop Sriboonlue; Assistant referees: Rachan Dawangpa, Kasama Loyma; Fourth official: Somkhid Sarapim

16 November 2022	MH Nakhon Si City (T3)	0–2	Buriram United (T1)	Tha Sala, Nakhon Si Thammarat
17:00 (UTC+7)		Report; Highlight	Chitipat Tanklang 43'; Supachai Chaided 48'	Stadium: Stadium of Walailak University; Attendance: 9,456; Referee: Noppadet Mangngam; Assistant referees: Suriya Lee-intr, Yossapon Tongprom; Fourth official: Paisan Bendem-alee

16 November 2022	Rayong (T2)	1–2 (a.e.t.)	Nongbua Pitchaya (T1)	Bankhai, Rayong
18:00 (UTC+7)	Anisong Jaroentham 87' (o.g.)	Report; Highlight	Chatri Rattanawong 54'; Ratchapol Nawanno 97'	Stadium: Wai Krong Stadium; Attendance: 641; Referee: Winat Phophat; Assistant referees: Ruangsak Nupuak, Khomchalach Lekhawijit; Fourth official: Phadoongkiat Piangdee

16 November 2022	Chiangmai (T2)	0–0 (a.e.t.) (8–7 p)	Sukhothai (T1)	Mueang, Chiangmai
18:00 (UTC+7)		Report; Highlight		Stadium: Chiangmai Municipality Stadium; Attendance: 696; Referee: Vitsavet Sangnakorn; Assistant referees: Apichit Nophuan, Binla Preeda; Fourth official: Peerasan Krataithong
	Penalties
	Lim Chang-gyoon (penalty missed); Kim Bo-yong (penalty scored); Phommin Kaeosanga (penalty scored); Tanin Kiatlerttham (penalty scored); Kiadtisak Nantavichianrit (penalty scored); Amornthep Maundee (penalty scored); Chatchai Nanthawichianrit (penalty scored); Suwit Paipromrat (penalty scored); Sarawut Koedsri (penalty scored)		(penalty missed) Anuchit Ngrnbukkol; (penalty scored) Peeranat Suemark; (penalty scored) Peeraphat Phasook; (penalty scored) Léster Blanco; (penalty scored) Veerapat Nilburapha; (penalty scored) Laércio Soldá; (penalty scored) Sila Srikampang; (penalty scored) Sarawut Kanlayanabandit; (penalty missed) Pattarapon Suksakit

16 November 2022	Chiangmai United (T2)	0–1 (a.e.t.)	Ratchaburi (T1)	Mae Rim, Chiangmai
18:00 (UTC+7)		Report; Highlight	Evson Patrício 114' (o.g.)	Stadium: 700th Anniversary of Chiangmai Stadium; Attendance: 510; Referee: Sarayut Jakngoen; Assistant referees: Waranyoo Chomgoson, Teerapon Sunyapluem; Fourth official: Wathanyu Morin

16 November 2022	Customs United (T2)	0–1	Bangkok United (T1)	Bang Phli, Samut Prakan
18:00 (UTC+7)		Report; Highlight	Heberty 10'	Stadium: Customs Department Stadium, Lad Krabang 54; Attendance: 570; Referee: Torphong Somsing; Assistant referees: Rachain Srichai, Phubes Lekpha; Fourth official: Ekkachai Phetcham

16 November 2022	Bangkok (T3)	1–4	Lamphun Warriors (T1)	Thung Khru, Bangkok
18:00 (UTC+7)	Bunlue Thongkliang 64'	Report; Highlight	Akarapong Pumwisat 28'; Ognjen Mudrinski 48', 52'; Chonlawit Kanuengkid 78'	Stadium: 72nd Anniversary Stadium, Bang Mot; Attendance: 800; Referee: Chaikrit Inboonsong; Assistant referees: Komsan Kampan, Natthaphon Mala; Fourth official: Satchukorn Saenchu

16 November 2022	Udon Thani (T2)	1–3	BG Pathum United (T1)	Mueang, Udon Thani
19:00 (UTC+7)	Greg Houla 26'	Report; Highlight	Teerasil Dangda 7', 38', 64'	Stadium: Stadium of Thailand National Sports University, Udon Thani Campus; Attendance: 1,860; Referee: Natee Choosuwan; Assistant referees: Tanate Chuchuen, Tanin Reunjit; Fourth official: Chaiya Moolmanee

16 November 2022	Ayutthaya United (T2)	1–0	Chiangrai United (T1)	Phra Nakhon Si Ayutthaya, Ayutthaya
19:00 (UTC+7)	Felipe Amorim 55' (o.g.)	Report; Highlight		Stadium: Ayutthaya Provincial Stadium; Attendance: 982; Referee: Phairot Bunkamnoed; Assistant referees: Chaowalit Poonprasit, Vichet Getkaew; Fourth official: Boonsong Prachumrak

16 November 2022	Nakhon Pathom United (T2)	1–0 (a.e.t.)	Chonburi (T1)	Mueang, Nakhon Pathom
19:00 (UTC+7)	Mohamed Essam 96'	Report; Highlight		Stadium: Stadium of Nakhon Pathom Municipality Sport School; Attendance: 1,212; Referee: Sivakorn Pu-udom; Assistant referees: Pattarapong Kijsathit, Banpot Khunhong; Fourth official: Suwat Wongsuwan

16 November 2022	Uthai Thani (T2)	1–1 (a.e.t.) (4–5 p)	PT Prachuap (T1)	Mueang, Uthai Thani
19:00 (UTC+7)	Carlos Damian dos Santos Puentes 75'	Report; Highlight	Apichart Denman 46'	Stadium: Uthai Thani Provincial Stadium; Attendance: 650; Referee: Chaireag Ngam-som; Assistant referees: Worapong Prasartsri, Sumate Peasiri; Fourth official: Piyapong Thongkhain
	Penalties
	Carlos Damian dos Santos Puentes (penalty missed); Kento Nagasaki (penalty scored); Wattana Klomjit (penalty scored); Adefolarin Durosinmi (penalty scored); Ricardo Santos (penalty scored); Aubpatum Thamthae (penalty missed)		(penalty scored) Samuel; (penalty scored) Dennis Villanueva; (penalty scored) Aris Zarifović; (penalty missed) Nattapon Malapun; (penalty scored) Kwanchai Suklom; (penalty scored) Eakkanut Kongket

=== Second round ===
The second round would be featured 16 clubs that were the winners of the first round including 10 clubs from T1, 3 clubs from T2, and 3 clubs from T3. This round had drawn on 8 December 2022. 22 goals occurred in this round.

25 January 2023	Dragon Pathumwan Kanchanaburi (T3)	0–2	Lamphun Warriors (T1)	Mueang, Kanchanaburi
15:00 (UTC+7)		Report; Highlight	Bill 14', 55'	Stadium: Kanchanaburi Municipality Stadium; Attendance: 345; Referee: Kotchapoom Meesridaecha; Assistant referees: Tanate Chuchuen, Rachain Srichai; Fourth official: Anusorn Nookaew

25 January 2023	Samut Songkhram (T3)	1–0	Lampang (T1)	Mueang, Samut Songkhram
17:00 (UTC+7)	Kouassi Yao Hermann 55'	Report; Highlight		Stadium: Samut Songkhram PAO. Stadium; Attendance: 182; Referee: Vitsavet Sangnakorn; Assistant referees: Chaowalit Poonprasit, Banpot Khunhong; Fourth official: Noppadet Mangngam

25 January 2023	Ayutthaya United (T2)	0–5	PT Prachuap (T1)	Phra Nakhon Si Ayutthaya, Ayutthaya
17:00 (UTC+7)		Report; Highlight	Brenner 14', 20' (pen.); Chinnawat Wongchai 77'; Nattapon Malapun 90'; Nattawut Suksum 90+2'	Stadium: Ayutthaya Provincial Stadium; Attendance: 271; Referee: Natee Choosuwan; Assistant referees: Natthaphon Mala, Wirot Lokham; Fourth official: Wiwat Jumpaoon

25 January 2023	Phitsanulok (T3)	0–4	Bangkok United (T1)	Mueang, Phitsanulok
17:00 (UTC+7)		Report; Highlight	Chayawat Srinawong 20'; Rungrath Poomchantuek 24'; Willen 40'; Wanchai Jarunongkran 90+1'	Stadium: Phitsanulok PAO. Stadium; Attendance: 2,364; Referee: Songkran Bunmeekiart; Assistant referees: Chotrawee Tongduang, Tanin Reunjit; Fourth official: Paisan Bendem-alee

25 January 2023	Ratchaburi (T1)	0–0 (a.e.t.) (5–4 p)	Nongbua Pitchaya (T1)	Mueang, Ratchaburi
18:00 (UTC+7)		Report; Highlight		Stadium: Dragon Solar Park; Attendance: 1,787; Referee: Mongkolchai Pechsri; Assistant referees: Apichit Nophuan, Komsan Kampan; Fourth official: Niwat Insa-ard
	Penalties
	Derley (penalty scored); Moussa Sidibé (penalty scored); Jakkaphan Kaewprom (penalty scored); Jirawat Thongsaengphrao (penalty scored); Pathomchai Sueasakul (penalty scored)		(penalty scored) Barros Tardeli; (penalty scored) Léo; (penalty missed) Leon James; (penalty scored) Tanapat Waempracha; (penalty scored) Islam Batran

25 January 2023	Nakhon Pathom United (T2)	2–3	BG Pathum United (T1)	Mueang, Nakhon Pathom
18:00 (UTC+7)	Thanawat Montree 16'; Athit Berg 43' (pen.)	Report; Highlight	Stênio Júnior 3'; Sarach Yooyen 15'; Parinya Autapol 74' (o.g.)	Stadium: Stadium of Nakhon Pathom Municipality Sport School; Attendance: 1,789; Referee: Sivakorn Pu-udom; Assistant referees: Pattarapong Kijsathit, Vichet Getkaew; Fourth official: Warintron Sassadee

25 January 2023	Chiangmai (T2)	2–0	Khon Kaen United (T1)	Mueang, Chiangmai
19:00 (UTC+7)	Tawan Khotrsupho 42'; Amornthep Maundee 87'	Report; Highlight		Stadium: Chiangmai Municipality Stadium; Attendance: 878; Referee: Chaireag Ngam-som; Assistant referees: Worapong Prasartsri, Waranyoo Chomgoson; Fourth official: Sarayut Jakngoen

25 January 2023	Muangthong United (T1)	1–2	Buriram United (T1)	Pak Kret, Nonthaburi
19:00 (UTC+7)	Willian Popp 80' (pen.)	Report; Highlight	Suphanat Mueanta 37'; Lucas Rocha 88' (o.g.)	Stadium: Thunderdome Stadium; Attendance: 9,723; Referee: Torphong Somsing; Assistant referees: Rawut Nakarit, Poonsawat Samransuk; Fourth official: Putthipong Issising

=== Quarter-finals ===
The quarter-finals would be featured 8 clubs that were the winners of the second round including 6 clubs from T1, 1 club from T2, and 1 club from T3. This round had drawn on 1 February 2023. 11 goals occurred in this round.

22 February 2023	Ratchaburi (T1)	2–1	Samut Songkhram (T3)	Mueang, Ratchaburi
17:00 (UTC+7)	Anon Amornlerdsak 38'; Kritsananon Srisuwan 52'	Report; Highlight	Park Jun-heong 30' (o.g.)	Stadium: Dragon Solar Park; Attendance: 1,327; Referee: Sarayut Jakngoen; Assistant referees: Chaowalit Poonprasit, Suriya Lee-intr; Fourth official: Kristin Saisombat

22 February 2023	Chiangmai (T2)	0–3	BG Pathum United (T1)	Mueang, Chiangmai
18:00 (UTC+7)		Report; Highlight	Apisit Sorada 28'; Irfan Fandi 38'; Ben Azubel 80'	Stadium: Chiangmai Municipality Stadium; Attendance: 2,773; Referee: Wiwat Jumpaoon; Assistant referees: Chotrawee Tongduang, Binla Preeda; Fourth official: Peerasan Krataithong

22 February 2023	Bangkok United (T1)	0–3	Buriram United (T1)	Khlong Luang, Pathum Thani
18:30 (UTC+7)		Report; Highlight	Suphanat Mueanta 30'; Haris Vučkić 50'; Goran Čaušić 77'	Stadium: Thammasat Stadium; Attendance: 6,973; Referee: Noppadet Mangngam; Assistant referees: Tanate Chuchuen, Apichit Nophuan; Fourth official: Vitsavet Sangnakorn

22 February 2023	Lamphun Warriors (T1)	0–2	PT Prachuap (T1)	Mae Rim, Chiangmai
19:00 (UTC+7)		Report; Highlight	Lossémy Karaboué 13'; Ibrahim Tomiwa Gbadamosi 41'	Stadium: 700th Anniversary of Chiangmai Stadium; Attendance: 472; Referee: Chaireag Ngam-som; Assistant referees: Worapong Prasartsri, Tuwae-yusoh Kuji; Fourth official: Putthipong Issising

=== Semi-finals ===
The semi-finals would be featured 4 clubs that were the winners of the quarter-finals, all are clubs from T1. This round had drawn on 28 March 2023. 5 goals occurred in this round.

26 April 2023	PT Prachuap (T1)	0–2	Buriram United (T1)	Mueang, Chonburi
18:00 (UTC+7)		Report; Highlight	Chatchai Budprom 16' (o.g.); Suphanat Mueanta 77'	Stadium: Chonburi UTA Stadium; Attendance: 2,548; Referee: Phairot Bunkamnoed; Assistant referees: Rawut Nakarit, Worapong Prasartsri; Fourth official: Noppadet Mangngam

26 April 2023	BG Pathum United (T1)	2–1	Ratchaburi (T1)	Khlong Toei, Bangkok
19:00 (UTC+7)	Patrik Gustavsson 15'; Teerasil Dangda 63'	Report; Highlight	Pathomchai Sueasakul 29'	Stadium: PAT Stadium; Attendance: 2,618; Referee: Mongkolchai Pechsri; Assistant referees: Tanate Chuchuen, Kasama Loyma; Fourth official: Kotchapoom Meesridaecha

=== Final ===
The final would be featured 2 clubs that were the winners of the semi-finals, both are clubs from T1. 2 goals occurred in this round.

20 May 2023	Buriram United (T1)	2–0	BG Pathum United (T1)	Pak Kret, Nonthaburi
18:00 (UTC+7)	Goran Čaušić 13'; Supachai Chaided 90+3'	Report; Highlight; Full match Ceremony		Stadium: Thunderdome Stadium; Attendance: 10,487; Referee: Chaireag Ngam-som; Assistant referees: Komsan Kampan, Worapong Prasartsri; Fourth official: Warintron Sassadee

== Tournament statistics ==
=== Top goalscorers ===
Rank	Player	Club	Goals
1	(Japan) Bruno Suzuki	Bangkok	4
1	(Thailand) Teerasil Dangda	BG Pathum United	4
1	(Ivory Coast) Boubacar Koné	MH Nakhon Si City	4
1	(Egypt) Mohamed Essam	Nakhon Pathom United	4
1	(Thailand) Guntapon Keereeleang	Samut Prakan	4
1	(Thailand) Apisit Prakhongpan	Uttaradit Saksiam	4
1	(Republic of the Congo) Burnel Okana-Stazi	Young Singh Hatyai United	4
8	(Thailand) Padungsak Phothinak	Bangkok	3
8	(Thailand) Suphanat Mueanta	Buriram United	3
8	(Cameroon) Ahmadou Tidjani	Lopburi City	3
8	(Brazil) Mairon Natan Pereira Maciel Oliveira	Phitsanulok	3
8	(Argentina) Nicolás Vélez	Phitsanulok	3
8	(France) Greg Houla	Udon Thani	3
8	(Brazil) Ranieri Luiz Barbosa	Udon United	3

=== Hat-tricks ===
Player	For	Against	Result	Date	Round
(Thailand) Apisit Prakhongpan	Uttaradit Saksiam (T3)	Kongkrailas United (T3)	5–1 (H)	4 September 2022	First qualification round
(Japan) Bruno Suzuki	Bangkok (T3)	STK Muangnont (T3)	5–1 (H)	4 September 2022	First qualification round
(Republic of the Congo) Burnel Okana-Stazi	Young Singh Hatyai United (T3)	Chainat Hornbill (T2)	3–3 (H)	19 October 2022	Qualification play-off round
(Egypt) Mohamed Essam	Nakhon Pathom United (T2)	Chachoengsao Hi-Tek (T3)	3–2 (A)	19 October 2022	Qualification play-off round
(Thailand) Teerasil Dangda	BG Pathum United (T1)	Udon Thani (T2)	3–1 (A)	16 November 2022	First round

Notes: (H) = Home team; (A) = Away team

== See also ==
- 2022–23 Thai League 1
- 2022–23 Thai League 2
- 2022–23 Thai League 3
- 2022–23 Thai League 3 Northern Region
- 2022–23 Thai League 3 Northeastern Region
- 2022–23 Thai League 3 Eastern Region
- 2022–23 Thai League 3 Western Region
- 2022–23 Thai League 3 Southern Region
- 2022–23 Thai League 3 Bangkok Metropolitan Region
- 2022–23 Thai League 3 National Championship
- 2022–23 Thai FA Cup
- 2022 Thailand Champions Cup
