= 2022–23 Thai League 3 National Championship =

Thai League 3 National Championship
- Season: 2022–23
- Dates: 1 April 2023 – 21 May 2023

The National Championship was the next stage from the regional stage of 2022–23 Thai League 3. The winners and runners-ups of each region would qualify for this round to find 3 clubs promoting to 2023–24 Thai League 2.

== Teams ==
Locations of the 2022–23 Thai League 3 National Championship Teams
Upper Region
Lower Region

Team	Qualifying method
Phitsanulok	Northern region champions
Uttaradit Saksiam	Northern region runners-up
Mahasarakham SBT	Northeastern region champions
Sisaket United	Northeastern region runners-up
Pattaya Dolphins United	Eastern region champions
Chanthaburi	Eastern region runners-up
Dragon Pathumwan Kanchanaburi	Western region champions
Samut Songkhram	Western region runners-up
Songkhla	Southern region champions
MH Nakhon Si City	Southern region runners-up
North Bangkok University	Bangkok metropolitan region champions
Bangkok	Bangkok metropolitan region runners-up

Locations of teams in Bangkok Metropolitan region

== Group stage ==
=== Upper region ===
Pos	Team	Pld	W	D	L	GF	GA	GD	Pts	Qualification	CTB	PAT	PLK	SKU	MSK	UTD
1	Chanthaburi (P)	5	3	2	0	11	7	+4	11	Qualification to the finals and promotion to the 2023–24 Thai League 2	—	—	3–3	—	4–2	—
2	Pattaya Dolphins United (P)	5	3	1	1	9	5	+4	10 (Note: Pattaya Dolphins United is ahead on the head-to-head points record; Pattaya Dolphins United 3 pts, Phitsanulok 0 pts.)	Qualification to the third place play-offs	0–0	—	—	3–1	3–1	—
3	Phitsanulok	5	3	1	1	11	10	+1	10		—	1–3	—	1–0	—	3–2
4	Sisaket United	5	1	1	3	7	6	+1	4 (Note: The head-to-head record is tied; Sisaket United 1 pt, Mahasarakham SBT 1 pt. Sisaket United is ahead on the overall goals difference.)		1–2	—	—	—	—	5–0
5	Mahasarakham SBT	5	1	1	3	10	12	−2	4		—	—	2–3	0–0	—	5–2
6	Uttaradit Saksiam	5	1	0	4	7	15	−8	3		1–2	2–0	—	—	—	—

Source: Thai League
Rules for classification: 1) Points; 2) Head-to-head points; 3) Goal difference; 4) Goals scored;).
(P) Promoted
Notes:
1 April 2023
17:00 UTC+7

Sisaket United	1–2	Chanthaburi
Romário Reginaldo Alves 90'	Report; Highlight	Natithorn Inntranon 13'; Luan Santos 26'

Sri Nakhon Lamduan Stadium,
Mueang, Sisaket
Attendance: 1,275
Referee: Thapana Thaworn (Thailand)
1 April 2023
18:00 UTC+7

Phitsanulok	3–2	Uttaradit Saksiam
Mairon Natan Pereira Maciel Oliveira 19'; Tanpisit Kukalamo 37'; Gilberto Macena 51'	Report; Highlight	Diarra Junior Aboubacar 25'; Chatchai Narkwijit 30'

Phitsanulok PAO. Stadium,
Mueang, Phitsanulok
Attendance: 1,805
Referee: Palathip Homwarn (Thailand)
1 April 2023
18:00 UTC+7

Pattaya Dolphins United	3–1	Mahasarakham SBT
Danilo 12' (pen.); Nicolás Vélez 66'; Attapong Kittichamratsak 81'	Report; Highlight	Nopparat Sakun-ood 72'

Nong Prue Stadium,
Bang Lamung, Chonburi
Attendance: 1,070
Referee: Nasri Tamat (Thailand)

9 April 2023
17:00 UTC+7

Mahasarakham SBT	5–2	Uttaradit Saksiam
Kiratikorn Ninlamat 15'; Nattapon Tabtanon 53'; Alberto Moreira Gouvea 71'; Erivelto 77'; Wattanasupt Jarernsri 88'	Report; Highlight	Chainarong Samuttha 43'; Giuberty Silva Neves 52'

Mahasarakham Provincial Stadium,
Mueang, Mahasarakham
Attendance: 1,129
Referee: Kriangkrai Thiphanunjarukorn (Thailand)
9 April 2023
18:00 UTC+7

Pattaya Dolphins United	0–0	Chanthaburi
	Report; Highlight

Nong Prue Stadium,
Bang Lamung, Chonburi
Attendance: 1,294
Referee: Ronachai Raepang (Thailand)
9 April 2023
18:00 UTC+7

Phitsanulok	1–0	Sisaket United
Ronnachai Pongputta 74'	Report; Highlight

Phitsanulok PAO. Stadium,
Mueang, Phitsanulok
Attendance: 1,929
Referee: Chaiya Kunawong (Thailand)

22 April 2023
16:00 UTC+7

Uttaradit Saksiam	2–0	Pattaya Dolphins United
Kittisak Wantawee 82'; Chainarong Samuttha 90'	Report; Highlight

Uttaradit Provincial Stadium,
Mueang, Uttaradit
Attendance: 473
Referee: Virittpol Pluemsilp (Thailand)
22 April 2023
17:00 UTC+7

Chanthaburi	3–3	Phitsanulok
Yannarit Sukcharoen 56'; Nattawut Dantrawen 67'; Caio Rodrigues da Cruz 90'	Report; Highlight	Gilberto Macena 36'; Alex Flávio 41' (o.g.); Visit Donard 90+4'

Chanthaburi Provincial Stadium,
Mueang, Chanthaburi
Attendance: 2,528
Referee: Teeramate Pooprang (Thailand)
22 April 2023
17:00 UTC+7

Mahasarakham SBT	0–0	Sisaket United
	Report; Highlight

Mahasarakham Provincial Stadium,
Mueang, Mahasarakham
Attendance: 1,349
Referee: Narongsak Kubkun (Thailand)

29 April 2023
17:00 UTC+7

Sisaket United	5–0	Uttaradit Saksiam
Cristian Alex 16', 73'; Romário Reginaldo Alves 46', 49'; Nitipat Kansorn 90+3'	Report; Highlight

Sri Nakhon Lamduan Stadium,
Mueang, Sisaket
Attendance: 366
Referee: Pongtut Ananta-art (Thailand)
29 April 2023
17:00 UTC+7

Chanthaburi	4–2	Mahasarakham SBT
Luan Santos 15', 47', 77'; Nattawut Dantrawen 62'	Report; Highlight	Puntakid Pombuppa 32'; Alberto Moreira Gouvea 88'

Chanthaburi Provincial Stadium,
Mueang, Chanthaburi
Attendance: 2,326
Referee: Thapana Thaworn (Thailand)
29 April 2023
18:00 UTC+7

Phitsanulok	1–3	Pattaya Dolphins United
Gilberto Macena 38'	Report; Highlight	Danilo 26'; Nicolás Vélez 36', 46'

Phitsanulok PAO. Stadium,
Mueang, Phitsanulok
Attendance: 3,769
Referee: Wicharn Klinthaworn (Thailand)

6 May 2023
16:00 UTC+7

Mahasarakham SBT	2–3	Phitsanulok
Phituckchai Limraksa 66'; Erivelto 90+1'	Report; Highlight	Mairon Natan Pereira Maciel Oliveira 29', 52'; Visit Donard 45+3'

Mahasarakham Provincial Stadium,
Mueang, Mahasarakham
Attendance: 984
Referee: Wichate Tainthong (Thailand)
6 May 2023
16:00 UTC+7

Pattaya Dolphins United	3–1	Sisaket United
Narakorn Khana 47'; Phon-ek Jensen 63'; Nicolás Vélez 89'	Report; Highlight	Phattharapong Phengchaem 69'

Nong Prue Stadium,
Bang Lamung, Chonburi
Attendance: 1,512
Referee: Kitisak Pikunngoen (Thailand)
6 May 2023
16:00 UTC+7

Uttaradit Saksiam	1–2	Chanthaburi
Polwat Pinkong 9'	Report; Highlight	Polwat Pinkong 2' (o.g.); Luan Santos 6'

Uttaradit Provincial Stadium,
Mueang, Uttaradit
Attendance: 590
Referee: Jirawit Phonkaew (Thailand)

=== Lower region ===
Pos	Team	Pld	W	D	L	GF	GA	GD	Pts	Qualification	MNS	DPK	SKA	NBU	BKK	SKM
1	MH Nakhon Si City (C)	5	4	1	0	11	3	+8	13	Qualification to the finals and promotion to the 2023–24 Thai League 2	—	2–1	—	—	3–0	—
2	Dragon Pathumwan Kanchanaburi (O, P)	5	3	1	1	8	2	+6	10	Qualification to the third place play-offs	—	—	4–0	—	1–0	0–0
3	Songkhla	5	2	1	2	10	8	+2	7		2–3	—	—	1–1	—	5–0
4	North Bangkok University	5	1	3	1	2	3	−1	6		0–0	0–2	—	—	—	1–0
5	Bangkok	5	1	1	3	2	7	−5	4		—	—	0–2	0–0	—	—
6	Samut Songkhram	5	0	1	4	1	11	−10	1		0–3	—	—	—	1–2	—

Source: Thai League
Rules for classification: 1) Points; 2) Head-to-head points; 3) Goal difference; 4) Goals scored;).
(C) Champions; (O) Play-off winners; (P) Promoted
2 April 2023
16:00 UTC+7

North Bangkok University	0–0	MH Nakhon Si City
	Report; Highlight

Stadium of North Bangkok University,
Thanyaburi, Pathum Thani
Attendance: 300
Referee: Jarin Yawapee (Thailand)
2 April 2023
16:00 UTC+7

Dragon Pathumwan Kanchanaburi	4–0	Songkhla
Taiga Matsunaga 11'; Anuwat Matarat 55'; Arnon Prasongporn 70'; Sirichai Lamphuttha 87'	Report; Highlight

Kanchanaburi Municipality Stadium,
Mueang, Kanchanaburi
Attendance: 553
Referee: Kriangkrai Thiphanunjarukorn (Thailand)
2 April 2023
17:00 UTC+7

Samut Songkhram	1–2	Bangkok
Kouassi Yao Hermann 74'	Report; Highlight	Padungsak Phothinak 64', 90'

Samut Songkhram PAO. Stadium,
Mueang, Samut Songkhram
Attendance: 1,435
Referee: Pissanusak Sriyai (Thailand)

8 April 2023
16:00 UTC+7

North Bangkok University	1–0	Samut Songkhram
Léster Blanco 8' (pen.)	Report; Highlight

Stadium of North Bangkok University,
Thanyaburi, Pathum Thani
Attendance: 225
Referee: Anon Lohlor (Thailand)
8 April 2023
16:00 UTC+7

Dragon Pathumwan Kanchanaburi	1–0	Bangkok
Sergei Tumasyan 45+3' (pen.)	Report; Highlight

Kanchanaburi Municipality Stadium,
Mueang, Kanchanaburi
Attendance: 449
Referee: Narinnart Tiamskun (Thailand)
8 April 2023
17:30 UTC+7

Songkhla	2–3	MH Nakhon Si City
Yod Chanthawong 60'; Jardel 81'	Report; Highlight	André Luís 55'; Ryo Tomigahara 65'; Somsak Musikaphan 90+2' (pen.)

Tinsulanon Stadium,
Mueang, Songkhla
Attendance: 929
Referee: Narongsak Kubkun (Thailand)

23 April 2023
17:00 UTC+7

Bangkok	0–0	North Bangkok University
	Report; Highlight

72nd Anniversary Stadium, Bang Mot,
Thung Khru, Bangkok
Attendance: 500
Referee: Nattawut Pornchaiwirun (Thailand)
23 April 2023
17:00 UTC+7

MH Nakhon Si City	2–1	Dragon Pathumwan Kanchanaburi
Adithep Chaisrianan 44'; André Luís 68'	Report; Highlight	Natakorn Soithong 87'

Stadium of Walailak University,
Tha Sala, Nakhon Si Thammarat
Attendance: 3,250
Referee: Thapana Thaworn (Thailand)
23 April 2023
17:30 UTC+7

Songkhla	5–0	Samut Songkhram
Sihanart Suttisak 34', 65'; Douglas Cobo 45+2' (pen.); Yod Chanthawong 86'; Apipoo Suntornpanavej 90+2'	Report; Highlight

Tinsulanon Stadium,
Mueang, Songkhla
Attendance: 945
Referee: Palathip Homwarn (Thailand)

29 April 2023
16:00 UTC+7

North Bangkok University	0–2	Dragon Pathumwan Kanchanaburi
	Report; Highlight	Nattapong Kumnaet 30'; Narathip Kruearanya 45+2'

Stadium of North Bangkok University,
Thanyaburi, Pathum Thani
Attendance: 320
Referee: Chalit Ploypech (Thailand)
29 April 2023
17:00 UTC+7

Bangkok	0–2	Songkhla
	Report; Highlight	Felipe Nunes 45+2'; Nobparut Raksachum 45+4'

72nd Anniversary Stadium, Bang Mot,
Thung Khru, Bangkok
Attendance: 500
Referee: Thanapon Suwannaket (Thailand)
1 May 2023
17:00 UTC+7

Samut Songkhram	0–3	MH Nakhon Si City
	Report; Highlight	André Luís 21', 45'; Somsak Musikaphan 75' (pen.)

Samut Songkhram PAO. Stadium,
Mueang, Samut Songkhram
Attendance: 255
Referee: Kriangkrai Thiphanunjarukorn (Thailand)

7 May 2023
16:00 UTC+7

Dragon Pathumwan Kanchanaburi	0–0	Samut Songkhram
	Report; Highlight

Kanchanaburi Municipality Stadium,
Mueang, Kanchanaburi
Attendance: 585
Referee: Veeraporn Maophaeo (Thailand)
7 May 2023
16:00 UTC+7

Songkhla	1–1	North Bangkok University
Yuttapong Srilakorn 90+4'	Report; Highlight	Veeraphong Aon-pean 64'

Tinsulanon Stadium,
Mueang, Songkhla
Attendance: 300
Referee: Poowasak Sukunt (Thailand)
7 May 2023
16:00 UTC+7

MH Nakhon Si City	3–0	Bangkok
Somsak Musikaphan 30', 61'; André Luís 69'	Report; Highlight

Stadium of Walailak University,
Tha Sala, Nakhon Si Thammarat
Attendance: 3,550
Referee: Kristin Saisombat (Thailand)

== Knockout stage ==
Winners, runners-up, and third place of 2022–23 Thai League 3 would be promoted to the 2023–24 Thai League 2.

=== Third place play-offs ===
==== Summary ====
Team 1	Agg.	Team 2	1st leg	2nd leg
Pattaya Dolphins United	2–3	Dragon Pathumwan Kanchanaburi	1–0	1–3

==== Matches ====
12 May 2023
17:00 UTC+7

Pattaya Dolphins United	1–0	Dragon Pathumwan Kanchanaburi
Nicolás Vélez 69'	Report; Highlight

Nong Prue Stadium,
Bang Lamung, Chonburi
Attendance: 1,256
Referee: Putthipong Issising (Thailand)
20 May 2023
15:30 UTC+7

Dragon Pathumwan Kanchanaburi	3–1	Pattaya Dolphins United
Nattapong Kumnaet 47'; Arnon Prasongporn 87', 90+6'	Report; Highlight	Danilo 40'

Kanchanaburi Municipality Stadium,
Mueang, Kanchanaburi
Attendance: 876
Referee: Winat Phophat (Thailand)

Dragon Pathumwan Kanchanaburi won 3–2 on aggregate.

=== Finals ===
==== Summary ====
Team 1	Agg.	Team 2	1st leg	2nd leg
MH Nakhon Si City	2–1	Chanthaburi	1–1	1–0

==== Matches ====
===== 1st leg =====
12 May 2023
17:00 UTC+7

MH Nakhon Si City	1–1	Chanthaburi
André Luís 16' (pen.)	Report; Highlight	Luan Santos 12'

Stadium of Walailak University,
Tha Sala, Nakhon Si Thammarat
Attendance: 2,850
Referee: Wicharn Klinthaworn (Thailand)

MH Nakhon Si City	Chanthaburi

Lineups:
GK	22	(Thailand) Jaturong Samakorn
RB	24	(Thailand) Niras Bu-nga (c)		(yellow card) 31'
CB	15	(Thailand) Thanakij Khanakai		(yellow card) 11'
CB	20	(Thailand) Phanuphan Chankaew
LB	39	(Thailand) Akarawit Saemaram
RM	7	(Thailand) Adithep Chaisrianan			(substituted off) 44'
CM	77	(Thailand) Attapon Chommaleethanawat			(substituted off) 60'
LM	21	(Ivory Coast) Boubacar Koné
RF	10	(Brazil) André Luís	16' (pen.)
CF	23	(Thailand) Somsak Musikaphan
LF	66	(Thailand) Sanan Samala			(substituted off) 90+1'
Substitutes:
GK	25	(Thailand) Chayanon Kraimas
DF	3	(Thailand) Sunchai Kongtong
DF	18	(Thailand) Pongsakorn Klinsaowakon
DF	27	(Thailand) Supakon Phetrat
MF	5	(Thailand) Suphakrit Matthochedi			(substituted in) 44'	(substituted off) 90+1'
MF	91	(Thailand) Peerapat Kantha			(substituted in) 60'
FW	11	(Thailand) Natdanai Makkarat			(substituted in) 90+1'
FW	17	(Thailand) Satawat Sakprom				(substituted in) 90+1'
FW	29	(Thailand) Aek-aroon Yodsuwan
Head Coach:
(Thailand) Alongkorn Thongaum

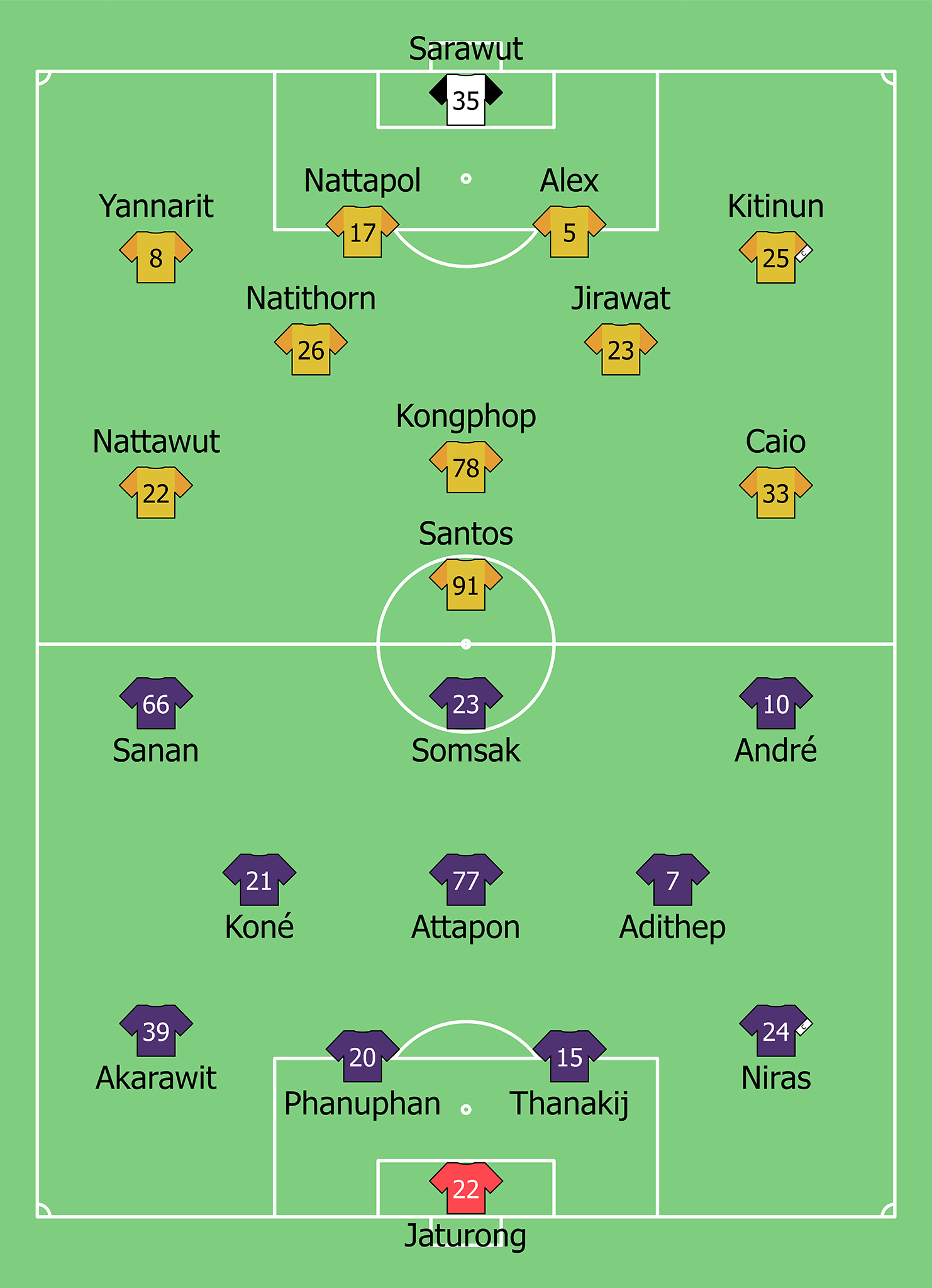

Lineups:
GK	35	(Thailand) Sarawut Konglarp
RB	8	(Thailand) Yannarit Sukcharoen		(yellow card) 15'
CB	17	(Thailand) Nattapol Hothong
CB	5	(Brazil) Alex Flávio
LB	25	(Thailand) Kitinun Suttiwiriyakul (c)		(yellow card) 39'
DM	26	(Thailand) Natithorn Inntranon		(yellow card) 34'	(substituted off) 90'
DM	23	(Thailand) Jirawat Chingchaiyaphum			(substituted off) 65'
RM	22	(Thailand) Nattawut Dantrawen			(substituted off) 81'
AM	78	(Thailand) Kongphop Luadsong			(substituted off) 81'
LM	33	(Brazil) Caio Rodrigues da Cruz
CF	91	(Brazil) Luan Santos	12'
Substitutes:
GK	1	(Thailand) Rattanachat Neamtaisong
DF	4	(Thailand) Kullawat Silae			(substituted in) 90'
DF	55	(Thailand) Kerkpol Kamkawang			(substituted in) 65'
MF	3	(Thailand) Punnapob Namanu
MF	10	(Thailand) Visit Chuenvanon
MF	30	(Thailand) Weerapat Kaewongsa			(substituted in) 81'
MF	79	(Thailand) Thanadon Supaphon			(substituted in) 81'
FW	13	(Thailand) Supot Jodjam
FW	24	(Thailand) Charin Boodhad
Head Coach:
(Thailand) Chawapol Kamolsil

===== 2nd leg =====
21 May 2023
17:00 UTC+7

Chanthaburi	0–1	MH Nakhon Si City
	Report; Highlight; Ceremony	Somsak Musikaphan 55'

Chanthaburi Provincial Stadium,
Mueang, Chanthaburi
Attendance: 2,920
Referee: Kitisak Pikunngoen (Thailand)

Chanthaburi	MH Nakhon Si City

Lineups:
GK	35	(Thailand) Sarawut Konglarp
RB	22	(Thailand) Nattawut Dantrawen
CB	17	(Thailand) Nattapol Hothong
CB	5	(Brazil) Alex Flávio
LB	25	(Thailand) Kitinun Suttiwiriyakul (c)
DM	78	(Thailand) Kongphop Luadsong	(yellow card) 22'	(substituted off) 46'
RM	13	(Thailand) Supot Jodjam		(substituted off) 46'
CM	23	(Thailand) Jirawat Chingchaiyaphum		(substituted off) 72'
CM	26	(Thailand) Natithorn Inntranon		(substituted off) 81'
LM	33	(Brazil) Caio Rodrigues da Cruz
CF	91	(Brazil) Luan Santos
Substitutes:
GK	1	(Thailand) Rattanachat Neamtaisong
DF	4	(Thailand) Kullawat Silae			(substituted in) 62'
DF	55	(Thailand) Kerkpol Kamkawang		(substituted in) 46'
MF	3	(Thailand) Punnapob Namanu		(substituted in) 46'	(substituted off) 62'
MF	6	(Thailand) Wasan Mala
MF	30	(Thailand) Weerapat Kaewongsa		(substituted in) 72'
MF	79	(Thailand) Thanadon Supaphon		(substituted in) 81'
MF	96	(Thailand) Kaison Roungreang
FW	24	(Thailand) Charin Boodhad
Head Coach:
(Thailand) Chawapol Kamolsil

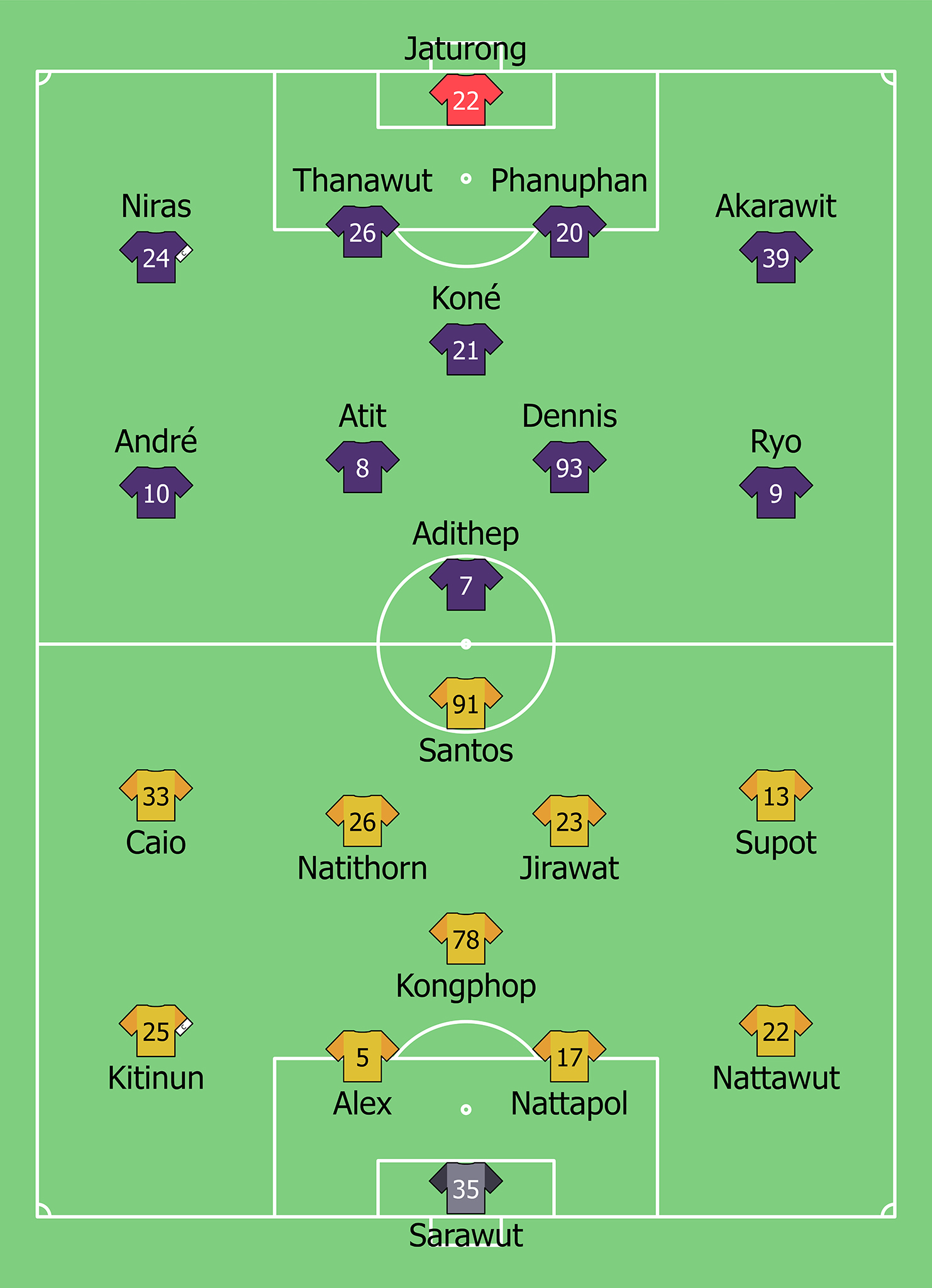

Lineups:
GK	22	(Thailand) Jaturong Samakorn
RB	24	(Thailand) Niras Bu-nga (c)
CB	26	(Thailand) Thanawut Klinsukon
CB	20	(Thailand) Phanuphan Chankaew
LB	39	(Thailand) Akarawit Saemaram			(substituted off) 79'
DM	21	(Ivory Coast) Boubacar Koné
RM	10	(Brazil) André Luís		(yellow card) 90+2'
CM	8	(Thailand) Atit Daosawang			(substituted off) 33'
CM	93	(Thailand) Dennis Buschening			(substituted off) 65'
LM	9	(Japan) Ryo Tomigahara
CF	7	(Thailand) Adithep Chaisrianan			(substituted off) 46'
Substitutes:
GK	25	(Thailand) Chayanon Kraimas
DF	27	(Thailand) Supakon Phetrat
DF	66	(Thailand) Sanan Samala			(substituted in) 79'
MF	5	(Thailand) Suphakrit Matthochedi			(substituted in) 65'
MF	77	(Thailand) Attapon Chommaleethanawat		(yellow card) 90+3' (yellow-red card) 90+6'	(substituted in) 33'
MF	91	(Thailand) Peerapat Kantha
FW	11	(Thailand) Natdanai Makkarat
FW	17	(Thailand) Satawat Sakprom
FW	23	(Thailand) Somsak Musikaphan	55'	(yellow card) 51'	(substituted in) 46'
Head Coach:
(Thailand) Alongkorn Thongaum

MH Nakhon Si City won 2–1 on aggregate.

== Statistics ==
=== Goalscorers ===
There were 97 goals scored in 34 matches, for an average of 2.85 goals per match.

6 goals

- (Brazil) Luan Santos (Chanthaburi)
- (Brazil) André Luís (MH Nakhon Si City)

5 goals

- (Thailand) Somsak Musikaphan (MH Nakhon Si City)
- (Argentina) Nicolás Vélez (Pattaya Dolphins United)

3 goals

- (Thailand) Arnon Prasongporn (Dragon Pathumwan Kanchanaburi)
- (Brazil) Danilo (Pattaya Dolphins United)
- (Brazil) Gilberto Macena (Phitsanulok)
- (Brazil) Mairon Natan Pereira Maciel Oliveira (Phitsanulok)
- (Brazil) Romário Reginaldo Alves (Sisaket United)

2 goals

- (Thailand) Padungsak Phothinak (Bangkok)
- (Thailand) Nattawut Dantrawen (Chanthaburi)
- (Thailand) Nattapong Kumnaet (Dragon Pathumwan Kanchanaburi)
- (Brazil) Alberto Moreira Gouvea (Mahasarakham SBT)
- (Brazil) Erivelto (Mahasarakham SBT)
- (Thailand) Visit Donard (Phitsanulok)
- (Brazil) Cristian Alex (Sisaket United)
- (Thailand) Sihanart Suttisak (Songkhla)
- (Thailand) Yod Chanthawong (Songkhla)
- (Thailand) Chainarong Samuttha (Uttaradit Saksiam)

1 goal

- (Brazil) Caio Rodrigues da Cruz (Chanthaburi)
- (Thailand) Natithorn Inntranon (Chanthaburi)
- (Thailand) Yannarit Sukcharoen (Chanthaburi)
- (Thailand) Anuwat Matarat (Dragon Pathumwan Kanchanaburi)
- (Thailand) Narathip Kruearanya (Dragon Pathumwan Kanchanaburi)
- (Thailand) Natakorn Soithong (Dragon Pathumwan Kanchanaburi)
- (Russia) Sergei Tumasyan (Dragon Pathumwan Kanchanaburi)
- (Thailand) Sirichai Lamphuttha (Dragon Pathumwan Kanchanaburi)
- (Japan) Taiga Matsunaga (Dragon Pathumwan Kanchanaburi)
- (Thailand) Kiratikorn Ninlamat (Mahasarakham SBT)
- (Thailand) Nattapon Tabtanon (Mahasarakham SBT)
- (Thailand) Nopparat Sakun-ood (Mahasarakham SBT)
- (Thailand) Phituckchai Limraksa (Mahasarakham SBT)
- (Thailand) Puntakid Pombuppa (Mahasarakham SBT)
- (Thailand) Wattanasupt Jarernsri (Mahasarakham SBT)
- (Thailand) Adithep Chaisrianan (MH Nakhon Si City)
- (Japan) Ryo Tomigahara (MH Nakhon Si City)
- (El Salvador) Léster Blanco (North Bangkok University)
- (Thailand) Veeraphong Aon-pean (North Bangkok University)
- (Thailand) Attapong Kittichamratsak (Pattaya Dolphins United)
- (Thailand) Narakorn Khana (Pattaya Dolphins United)
- (Thailand) Phon-ek Jensen (Pattaya Dolphins United)
- (Thailand) Ronnachai Pongputta (Phitsanulok)
- (Thailand) Tanpisit Kukalamo (Phitsanulok)
- (Ivory Coast) Kouassi Yao Hermann (Samut Songkhram)
- (Thailand) Nitipat Kansorn (Sisaket United)
- (Thailand) Phattharapong Phengchaem (Sisaket United)
- (Thailand) Apipoo Suntornpanavej (Songkhla)
- (Brazil) Douglas Cobo (Songkhla)
- (Brazil) Felipe Nunes (Songkhla)
- (Brazil) Jardel (Songkhla)
- (Thailand) Nobparut Raksachum (Songkhla)
- (Thailand) Yuttapong Srilakorn (Songkhla)
- (Thailand) Chatchai Narkwijit (Uttaradit Saksiam)
- (Ivory Coast) Diarra Junior Aboubacar (Uttaradit Saksiam)
- (Brazil) Giuberty Silva Neves (Uttaradit Saksiam)
- (Thailand) Kittisak Wantawee (Uttaradit Saksiam)
- (Thailand) Polwat Pinkong (Uttaradit Saksiam)

1 own goal

- (Brazil) Alex Flávio (Chanthaburi against Phitsanulok)
- (Thailand) Polwat Pinkong (Uttaradit Saksiam against Chanthaburi)

Source: Thai League

== Teams promoted to 2023–24 Thai League 2 ==
- Chanthaburi (runners-up)
- Dragon Pathumwan Kanchanaburi (third-placed)
- Pattaya Dolphins United (fourth-placed)
