= Atit Daosawang =

Thai footballer (born 1992)

Personal information
- Full name: Atit Daosawang
- Date of birth: 11 November 1992 (age 34)
- Place of birth: Prachuap Khiri Khan, Thailand
- Height: 1.77 m (5 ft 10 in)
- Positions: Centre back; right back

Youth career
- 2008: Sarawittaya School

Senior career*
Years	Team	Apps	(Gls)
2009–2010	TOT	34	(1)
2011–2017	Muangthong United	56	(0)
2012	→ Suphanburi (loan)	18	(0)
2016	→ Port (loan)	10	(0)
2017	→ BEC Tero Sasana (loan)	0	(0)
2017–2018	Chiangrai United	25	(0)
2019	Suphanburi	16	(0)
2020	Trat	0	(0)
2020–2021	PT Prachuap	0	(0)
2021	Chiangmai United	6	(0)
2021–2022	Phrae United	2	(0)
2022–2023	MH Nakhon Si City	19	(0)
2023	Hua Hin City	5	(0)
2023	Phitsanulok	1	(0)
Total		192	(1)

International career
2009–2010	Thailand U19	15	(0)
2012–2015	Thailand U23	15	(1)
2013–2016	Thailand	7	(0)
Medal record
Thailand under-19
AFF U-19 Youth Championship
Winner	AFF U-19 Youth Championship 2009	Football
Thailand under-23
Sea Games
Gold medal – first place	Sea Games 2013	Football
Gold medal – first place	Sea Games 2015	Football
Thailand
Asean Football Championship
Winner	AFF Suzuki Cup 2014	2014
- * Club domestic league appearances and goals

Atit Daosawang (Thai: อาทิตย์ ดาวสว่าง) is a Thai former professional footballer who plays as a centre-back.

== Football career ==
Atit Daosawang is known as the youngest player to play the Thai Premier League in 2009. He debuted when he was just 16 years and 131 days old when he played for TOT-CAT F.C. against Muangthong United on 24 March 2009.

== International career ==
Atit played for Thailand's first team against China in a friendly match, which Thailand won 5–1. He represented Thailand U23 in the 2013 Southeast Asian Games. Atit is part of Thailand's squad in the 2014 AFF Suzuki Cup. Atit won the 2015 Southeast Asian Games with Thailand U23.

=== International goals ===
==== under-23 ====
Artit Daosawang – goals for Thailand U23
#	Date	Venue	Opponent	Score	Result	Competition
1.	December 7, 2013	Yangon, Myanmar	Timor-Leste	3–0	3–1	2013 Southeast Asian Games

== Honours ==
=== International ===
Thailand

- ASEAN Football Championship Winner (1) : 2014

Thailand U-23

- Sea Games Gold Medal (2); 2013, 2015

Thailand U-19

- AFF U-19 Youth Championship (1): 2009

Thailand U-17

- AFF U-16 Youth Championship (1): 2007

=== Club ===
Muangthong United

- Thai League 1 (1): 2012

Chiangrai United

- Thai FA Cup (1): 2017
- Thailand Champions Cup (1): 2018

MH Nakhon Si City

- Thai League 3 (1): 2022–23

== Personal life ==
On 22 April 2016 Atit was indefinitely disqualified from the national team for allegedly engaging in sexual activity with a 17-year-old. Atit initially denied the charges but later admitted to having had a consensual relationship with the woman. Thai coach Kiatisuk Senamuang said Atit would be suspended until he reformed his behavior.
