= Somsak Musikaphan =

Thai footballer

Personal information
- Full name: Somsak Musikaphan
- Date of birth: 25 November 1992 (age 33)
- Place of birth: Bangkok, Thailand
- Height: 1.73 m (5 ft 8 in)
- Position: Forward

Team information
- Current team: Fleet
- Number: 34

Senior career*
Years	Team	Apps	(Gls)
2016–2017	Air Force United		
2017–2019	Ratchaburi Mitr Phol	5	(0)
2018	→ Sisaket (loan)		
2018	→ Ubon UMT (loan)	15	(5)
2019	→ Air Force Central (loan)	14	(1)
2019	→ Chainat Hornbill (loan)	5	(0)
2020–2021	Lampang	33	(7)
2021–2022	Bangkok	31	(10)
2022–2023	MH Nakhon Si City	28	(14)
2023	Samut Sakhon City	6	(0)
2024	Muang Loei United	4	(0)
2024–	Fleet	22	(11)
- * Club domestic league appearances and goals

Somsak Musikaphan (Thai: สมศักดิ์ มุสิกะพันธ์) is a Thai professional footballer who plays as a forward for Fleet.

== Honours ==
MH Nakhon Si City

- Thai League 3 (1): 2022–23
