= Henri Jöel =

Ivorian footballer

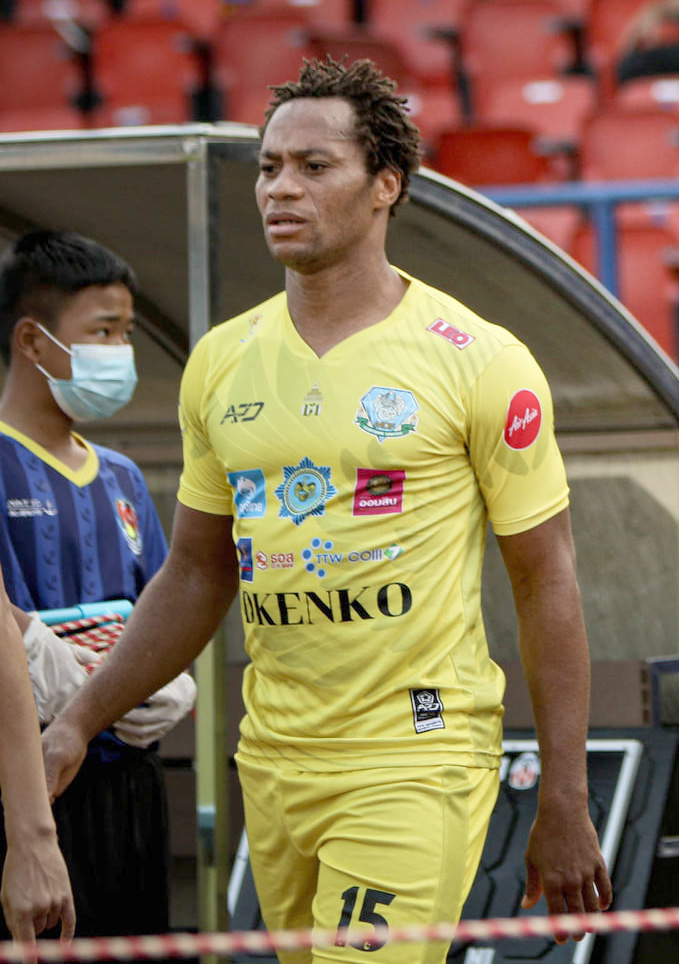

Personal information
- Full name: Henri Jöel Kouakou Tahiri
- Date of birth: 29 November 1986 (age 39)
- Place of birth: Abidjan, Ivory Coast
- Height: 1.80 m (5 ft 11 in)
- Position: Center back

Team information
- Current team: Saraburi United
- Number: 24

Senior career*
Years	Team	Apps	(Gls)
2009–2010	Buriram PEA	13	(1)
2011–2015	Ratchaburi	132	(4)
2016	Chiangmai	16	(2)
2017	Nakhon Pathom United	6	(0)
2018	Samut Sakhon	0	(0)
2019–2021	Kasetsart	56	(1)
2021–2022	Chainat United	17	(1)
2022–2023	North Bangkok University	28	(1)
2023–	Saraburi United	20	(0)
- * Club domestic league appearances and goals as of 25 February 2024

Henri Jöel Kouakou Tahiri (born March 17, 1986) is an Ivorian professional footballer who plays as a centre-back for Thai League 3 club Saraburi United.

== Club career ==
=== Buriram PEA ===
He played for them in a 2009 AFC Champions League match against Singapore Armed Forces FC.

== Honours ==
North Bangkok University

- Thai League 3 Bangkok Metropolitan Region: 2022–23
