= 2022–23 Thai League 3 Bangkok Metropolitan Region =

Thai League 3 Bangkok Metropolitan Region
- Season: 2022–23
- Dates: 10 September 2022 – 19 March 2023
- Champions: North Bangkok University
- Relegated: Siam
- T3 National Championship: North Bangkok University; Bangkok
- Matches: 182
- Goals: 455 (2.5 per match)
- Top goalscorer: (Ivory Coast) Bireme Diouf (19 goals; Samut Sakhon City)
- Best goalkeeper: (Thailand) Sanan Amkoed (15 clean sheets; North Bangkok University)
- Biggest home win: 4 goals difference Samut Sakhon City 5–1 Siam (17 September 2022); Samut Prakan 5–1 Royal Thai Army (5 March 2023)
- Biggest away win: 3 goals difference Royal Thai Air Force 1–4 North Bangkok University (17 September 2022); Samut Prakan 1–4 Bangkok (25 September 2022); STK Muangnont 0–3 Samut Prakan (16 October 2022); Royal Thai Air Force 0–3 Thonburi United (22 October 2022); Chamchuri United 0–3 Nonthaburi United S.Boonmeerit (23 October 2022); STK Muangnont 1–4 North Bangkok University (29 October 2022); Nonthaburi United S.Boonmeerit 0–3 AUU Inter Bangkok (9 November 2022); Royal Thai Air Force 1–4 Nonthaburi United S.Boonmeerit (22 January 2023); Siam 1–4 North Bangkok University (22 January 2023); Royal Thai Army 0–3 Prime Bangkok (29 January 2023); Prime Bangkok 0–3 Samut Prakan (11 February 2023); Samut Prakan 1–4 Nonthaburi United S.Boonmeerit (15 February 2023)
- Highest scoring: 9 goals Royal Thai Army 4–5 Samut Sakhon City (30 October 2022)
- Longest winning run: 7 matches Samut Sakhon City
- Longest unbeaten run: 13 matches Prime Bangkok
- Longest winless run: 17 matches Royal Thai Air Force
- Longest losing run: 6 matches Siam
- Highest attendance: 560; Thonburi United 1–3 Samut Sakhon City (11 September 2022)
- Lowest attendance: 1 Kasem Bundit University 0–2 Royal Thai Army (22 October 2022)
- Total attendance: 35,495
- Average attendance: 204

The 2022–23 Thai League 3 Bangkok metropolitan region is a region in the regional stage of the 2022–23 Thai League 3. The tournament was sponsored by Kongsalak Plus, and known as the Kongsalak Plus League for sponsorship purposes. A total of 14 teams located in Bangkok metropolitan region and Central of Thailand will compete in the league of the Bangkok metropolitan region.

== Teams ==
=== Number of teams by province ===
Position	Province	Number	Teams
1	Bangkok	8	AUU Inter Bangkok, Bangkok, Chamchuri United, Kasem Bundit University, Prime Bangkok, Samut Sakhon City, Siam, and Thonburi United
2	Nonthaburi	2	Nonthaburi United S.Boonmeerit and STK Muangnont
2	Pathum Thani	2	North Bangkok University and Royal Thai Air Force
4	Nakhon Nayok	1	Royal Thai Army
4	Samut Prakan	1	Samut Prakan

=== Stadiums and locations ===
Locations of the 2022–23 Thai League 3 Bangkok metropolitan region teams

Team	Location	Stadium	Coordinates
AUU Inter Bangkok	Bangkok (Minburi)	72nd Anniversary Stadium, Minburi	13°48′08″N 100°47′28″E
Bangkok	Bangkok (Thung Khru)	72nd Anniversary Stadium, Bang Mot	13°38′49″N 100°29′34″E
Chamchuri United	Bangkok (Pathum Wan)	Stadium of Chulalongkorn University	13°44′14″N 100°31′33″E
Kasem Bundit University	Bangkok (Minburi)	Stadium of Kasem Bundit University	13°48′06″N 100°44′06″E
Nonthaburi United S.Boonmeerit	Nonthaburi (Bang Yai)	Nonthaburi Provincial Stadium	13°51′03″N 100°26′28″E
North Bangkok University	Pathum Thani (Thanyaburi)	Stadium of North Bangkok University	14°00′22″N 100°40′24″E
Prime Bangkok	Bangkok (Bang Kapi)	Ramkhamhaeng University Stadium	13°45′16″N 100°37′00″E
Royal Thai Air Force	Pathum Thani (Lam Luk Ka)	Thupatemi Stadium	13°57′04″N 100°37′30″E
Royal Thai Army	Nakhon Nayok (Mueang)	Stadium of Chulachomklao Royal Military Academy	14°17′29″N 101°10′02″E
Samut Prakan	Samut Prakan (Bang Sao Thong)	Samut Prakan Stadium	13°34′45″N 100°47′41″E
Samut Sakhon City	Bangkok (Thawi Watthana)	Stadium of Bangkok Thonburi University	13°46′09″N 100°20′44″E
Siam	Bangkok (Minburi)	72nd Anniversary Stadium, Minburi	13°48′08″N 100°47′28″E
STK Muangnont	Nonthaburi (Mueang)	Stadium of Nonthaburi Youth Centre	13°52′44″N 100°32′39″E
Thonburi United	Bangkok (Nong Khaem)	Thonburi Stadium	13°43′28″N 100°20′43″E

Locations of teams in Bangkok metropolitan region

=== Foreign players ===
A T3 team could register 3 foreign players from foreign players all around the world. A team can use 3 foreign players on the field in each game.

Note :
(substituted off) : players who released during second leg transfer window;
(substituted in) : players who registered during second leg transfer window.

AFC member countries players.
CAF member countries players.
CONCACAF member countries players.
CONMEBOL member countries players.
OFC member countries players.
UEFA member countries players.
No foreign player registered.

Club	Leg	Player 1	Player 2	Player 3
AUU Inter Bangkok	1st
AUU Inter Bangkok	2nd
Bangkok	1st	(Liberia) Dauda Bortu (substituted off)	(Japan) Bruno Suzuki (substituted off)	(Japan) Goshi Okubo
Bangkok	2nd	(Brazil) Caíque Freitas Ribeiro (substituted in)	(Japan) Seiya Kojima (substituted in)	(Japan) Goshi Okubo
Chamchuri United	1st	(Cameroon) Isaac Honore Aime Mbengan	(Cameroon) Lionel Frank Touko Nzola	(Ivory Coast) Mohamed Kouadio
Chamchuri United	2nd	(Cameroon) Isaac Honore Aime Mbengan	(Cameroon) Lionel Frank Touko Nzola	(Ivory Coast) Mohamed Kouadio
Kasem Bundit University	1st	(Egypt) Basam Radwan Mahmoud Mohamed Afify (substituted off)	(South Korea) Ma Ye-sung (substituted off)	(South Korea) Lee Gi-been (substituted off)
Kasem Bundit University	2nd	(Nigeria) Chinonso Kingsley Thomas (substituted in)
Nonthaburi United S.Boonmeerit	1st	(Brazil) Carlos Eduardo dos Santos Lima (substituted off)	(Senegal) Mouhamadou Fallou Mbacke (substituted off)	(Senegal) Amadou Adama Ndiongue (substituted off)
Nonthaburi United S.Boonmeerit	2nd	(Brazil) Abner Gomes Faria (substituted in)	(Ivory Coast) Koné Ismaël (substituted in)
North Bangkok University	1st	(Brazil) Célio Guilherme da Silva Santos (substituted off)	(Ivory Coast) Coulibaly Chomana	(Ivory Coast) Henri Jöel
North Bangkok University	2nd	(El Salvador) Léster Blanco (substituted in)	(Ivory Coast) Coulibaly Chomana	(Ivory Coast) Henri Jöel
Prime Bangkok	1st	(Egypt) Mohamed Imam Ali Mohamed	(Morocco) Ashraf Tantaoui	(Saint Kitts and Nevis) Tishan Tajahni Hanley
Prime Bangkok	2nd	(Egypt) Mohamed Imam Ali Mohamed	(Morocco) Ashraf Tantaoui	(Saint Kitts and Nevis) Tishan Tajahni Hanley
Royal Thai Air Force	1st		(Ghana) Emmanuel Kwame Akadom	(Cameroon) Bango Olivier
Royal Thai Air Force	2nd	(Brazil) Vinícius Silva Freitas (substituted in)	(Ghana) Emmanuel Kwame Akadom	(Cameroon) Bango Olivier
Royal Thai Army	1st
Royal Thai Army	2nd
Samut Prakan	1st		(South Korea) Oh Jun-seok	(South Korea) Shim Gwang-uk
Samut Prakan	2nd	(Japan) Kazuo Honma (substituted in)	(South Korea) Oh Jun-seok	(South Korea) Shim Gwang-uk
Samut Sakhon City	1st		(Brazil) Pedro Dias (substituted off)	(Ivory Coast) Bireme Diouf
Samut Sakhon City	2nd	(Brazil) Andrey Coutinho (substituted in)	(Brazil) Ailton (substituted in)	(Ivory Coast) Bireme Diouf
Siam	1st	(Senegal) Aliou Seck (substituted off)	(Japan) Naoto Hiraishi (substituted off)	(Ghana) Sarfo Otis Adjei
Siam	2nd	(Ghana) Bernard Owusu Mintah (substituted in)	(South Korea) Ma Ye-sung (substituted in)	(Ghana) Sarfo Otis Adjei
STK Muangnont	1st	(Brazil) Guilherme Moreira (substituted off)	(Japan) Naoya Tokai (substituted off)	(Nigeria) George Kehinde
STK Muangnont	2nd	(France) Zady Moise Gnenegbe (substituted in)	(France) Annor Ferdinand (substituted in)	(Nigeria) George Kehinde
Thonburi United	1st	(Cameroon) Moussa Abakar (substituted off)	(Argentina) Ramiro Lizaso	(Azerbaijan) Mammad Guliyev
Thonburi United	2nd	(Morocco) Jaouad Afri (substituted in)	(Argentina) Ramiro Lizaso	(Azerbaijan) Mammad Guliyev

== League table ==
=== Standings ===
Pos	Team	Pld	W	D	L	GF	GA	GD	Pts	Qualification or relegation
1	North Bangkok University (C, Q)	26	15	8	3	39	16	+23	53 (Note: The mini-league points record; North Bangkok University 7 pts (GD +2), Bangkok 7 pts (GD +1), Samut Sakhon City 3 pts.)	Qualification to the National Championship stage
2	Bangkok (Q)	26	15	8	3	48	29	+19	53	Qualification to the National Championship stage
3	Samut Sakhon City	26	17	2	7	48	35	+13	53	
4	Prime Bangkok	26	13	7	6	36	22	+14	46	
5	Chamchuri United	26	10	8	8	33	31	+2	38	
6	Kasem Bundit University	26	10	6	10	31	32	−1	36 (Note: Kasem Bundit University ahead on the head-to-head points record; Kasem Bundit University 4 pts, Samut Prakan 1 pt.)	
7	Samut Prakan	26	8	12	6	33	27	+6	36	
8	Nonthaburi United S.Boonmeerit	26	9	4	13	35	36	−1	31	
9	Royal Thai Army	26	8	6	12	25	39	−14	30	
10	AUU Inter Bangkok	26	7	6	13	26	28	−2	27	
11	STK Muangnont	26	5	11	10	28	38	−10	26	
12	Thonburi United	26	6	7	13	25	35	−10	25	
13	Royal Thai Air Force	26	4	9	13	31	49	−18	21	
14	Siam (R)	26	4	8	14	17	38	−21	20	Relegation to the Thailand Semi-Pro League

Source: Thai League
Rules for classification: 1) Points; 2) Head-to-head points; 3) Head-to-head goal difference; 4) Head-to-head goal scored; 5) Overall goal difference; 6) Overall goal scored; 7) Fair play points; 8) Play-off without extra time).
(C) Champions; (Q) Qualified for the phase indicated; (R) Relegated

=== Positions by round ===
Team ╲ Round	1	2	3	4	5	6	7	8	9	10	11	12	13	14	15	16	17	18	19	20	21	22	23	24	25	26
North Bangkok University	6	3	2	2	1	1	3	3	3	2	2	3	2	1	1	1	1	1	1	2	2	1	1	2	1	1
Bangkok	4	4	1	1	3	3	1	1	2	3	4	4	4	4	3	3	3	4	4	3	3	3	3	3	2	2
Samut Sakhon City	1	1	3	6	7	6	5	4	4	4	3	2	3	3	2	2	2	2	2	1	1	2	2	1	3	3
Prime Bangkok	3	2	4	3	2	2	2	2	1	1	1	1	1	2	4	4	4	3	3	4	4	4	4	4	4	4
Chamchuri United	5	8	10	11	11	11	11	12	12	10	10	10	10	10	10	10	7	7	6	5	5	5	5	5	5	5
Kasem Bundit University	10	10	7	8	6	4	6	8	8	6	7	7	8	6	7	8	10	11	11	10	10	9	7	6	7	6
Samut Prakan	2	5	8	5	9	7	7	6	5	7	6	6	6	7	8	9	9	8	8	8	8	7	6	7	6	7
Nonthaburi United S.Boonmeerit	11	6	5	4	4	5	4	5	6	8	8	9	7	9	9	7	8	9	10	9	9	8	9	9	8	8
Royal Thai Army	12	7	6	9	10	10	9	9	9	9	9	8	9	8	6	5	5	5	5	6	6	6	8	8	9	9
AUU Inter Bangkok	9	12	9	7	5	8	8	7	7	5	5	5	5	5	5	6	6	6	7	7	7	10	10	10	10	10
STK Muangnont	8	11	12	12	12	12	13	13	13	13	13	13	13	12	12	12	12	12	12	12	12	12	12	12	11	11
Thonburi United	13	13	13	13	13	13	12	11	11	12	11	12	11	11	11	11	11	10	9	11	11	11	11	11	12	12
Royal Thai Air Force	7	9	11	10	8	9	10	10	10	11	12	11	12	13	13	13	13	14	14	14	14	13	13	13	14	13
Siam	14	14	14	14	14	14	14	14	14	14	14	14	14	14	14	14	14	13	13	13	13	14	14	14	13	14

Source: Thai League
= Qualification to the National Championship stage; = Relegation to the Thailand Amateur League

=== Results by round ===
Team ╲ Round	1	2	3	4	5	6	7	8	9	10	11	12	13	14	15	16	17	18	19	20	21	22	23	24	25	26
North Bangkok University	W	W	W	W	W	D	L	W	W	W	D	W	D	W	W	W	D	L	D	D	D	W	W	L	W	D
Bangkok	W	W	W	W	L	W	W	W	L	D	D	W	D	D	W	L	W	D	D	W	W	D	W	W	W	D
Samut Sakhon City	W	W	L	L	D	W	W	W	W	W	W	W	L	D	W	W	L	W	W	W	L	L	W	W	L	W
Prime Bangkok	W	W	W	W	W	D	D	W	W	W	W	D	D	L	L	L	W	W	L	D	D	D	L	W	L	W
Chamchuri United	W	L	L	D	L	D	L	L	D	W	D	L	W	D	W	D	W	W	W	W	W	D	L	D	W	L
Kasem Bundit University	L	D	W	D	W	W	L	D	W	L	D	L	D	W	L	L	L	L	L	W	D	W	W	W	L	W
Samut Prakan	W	D	L	W	L	W	D	W	D	L	D	D	D	L	L	D	D	D	W	L	D	W	W	D	W	D
Nonthaburi United S.Boonmeerit	L	W	W	D	W	D	W	L	L	L	L	L	W	L	L	W	L	L	L	W	D	W	L	L	W	D
Royal Thai Army	L	W	D	L	L	D	W	L	W	L	D	W	L	W	W	W	L	D	W	L	D	L	L	D	L	L
AUU Inter Bangkok	L	L	W	W	W	L	L	W	L	W	D	D	W	L	D	L	L	W	L	L	D	L	L	D	L	D
STK Muangnont	L	L	D	D	L	L	D	L	D	D	L	W	L	W	L	W	D	D	D	D	W	D	L	D	W	L
Thonburi United	L	L	L	L	L	D	W	D	D	L	W	L	D	W	L	W	W	D	D	L	L	D	W	L	L	L
Royal Thai Air Force	W	L	L	D	W	L	L	L	D	L	D	D	L	L	D	L	D	L	D	L	D	D	W	L	L	W
Siam	L	L	L	L	L	L	D	L	D	L	L	L	W	D	W	L	W	D	D	D	L	L	L	D	W	D

Source: Thai League
W = Won; D = Drawn; L = Lost

=== Results ===
Home \ Away	AIB	BKK	CCU	KBU	NBS	NBU	PBK	AIR	ARM	SPK	SKC	SIA	SMN	TBU
AUU Inter Bangkok	—	0–0	2–1	0–1	1–2	0–0	2–2	0–0	0–1	1–1	1–3	0–1	1–0	3–0
Bangkok	3–1	—	0–0	3–1	1–0	3–3	1–0	5–3	2–1	2–1	0–1	3–0	2–2	2–1
Chamchuri United	1–0	2–4	—	0–2	0–3	1–0	2–1	1–2	4–1	0–1	1–1	1–0	0–1	3–1
Kasem Bundit University	0–2	5–3	0–1	—	1–2	0–0	1–0	1–1	0–2	3–2	1–0	1–0	1–2	3–1
Nonthaburi United S.Boonmeerit	0–3	1–1	1–2	3–0	—	0–1	0–0	1–1	1–1	1–2	1–2	0–1	3–2	1–3
North Bangkok University	1–0	2–3	0–0	0–0	1–0	—	0–0	3–1	3–0	0–0	3–1	2–0	1–1	1–0
Prime Bangkok	1–0	0–0	2–1	1–0	4–1	3–1	—	0–0	2–1	0–3	2–3	2–1	2–0	4–1
Royal Thai Air Force	1–3	1–2	2–2	1–3	1–4	1–4	1–2	—	3–1	0–0	2–3	0–1	3–1	0–3
Royal Thai Army	2–1	1–0	0–1	1–0	1–0	0–1	0–3	0–1	—	0–0	4–5	1–1	1–1	1–1
Samut Prakan	0–0	1–4	2–2	0–0	1–4	0–2	0–0	2–2	5–1	—	2–0	2–2	0–0	1–1
Samut Sakhon City	2–1	1–2	0–2	2–1	3–2	0–1	1–3	2–1	3–0	2–1	—	5–1	2–1	2–1
Siam	0–2	1–1	1–1	1–2	0–2	1–4	0–0	3–1	0–1	0–2	0–0	—	2–2	0–2
STK Muangnont	3–1	0–0	3–3	2–2	2–0	1–4	1–2	1–1	1–3	0–3	0–1	0–0	—	1–0
Thonburi United	2–1	0–1	1–1	2–2	1–2	0–1	1–0	1–1	0–0	0–1	1–3	1–0	0–0	—

Source: Thai League
Legend: Blue = home team win; Yellow = draw; Red = away team win.
For upcoming matches, an "a" indicates there is an article about the rivalry between the two participants.

== Season statistics ==
=== Top scorers ===
As of 19 March 2023.

Rank	Player	Club	Goals
1	(Ivory Coast) Bireme Diouf	Samut Sakhon City	19
2	(Thailand) Jakkapong Polmart	Royal Thai Air Force	13
3	(Thailand) Bunlue Thongkliang	Bangkok	11
4	(Saint Kitts and Nevis) Tishan Tajahni Hanley	Prime Bangkok	10
5	(Ivory Coast) Mohamed Kouadio	Chamchuri United	9
6	(Thailand) Aphiwat Charoenlai	AUU Inter Bangkok	8
6	(Ghana) Sarfo Otis Adjei	Siam	8

=== Hat-tricks ===
Player	For	Against	Result	Date
(Ivory Coast) Bireme Diouf	Samut Sakhon City	Siam	5–1 (H)	17 September 2022
(Ivory Coast) Mohamed Kouadio	Chamchuri United	Royal Thai Army	4–1 (H)	26 November 2022

Notes: (H) = Home team; (A) = Away team

=== Clean sheets ===
As of 19 March 2023.

Rank	Player	Club	Clean sheets
1	(Thailand) Sanan Amkoed	North Bangkok University	15
2	(Thailand) Phuwadol Pholsongkram	Samut Prakan	13
3	(Thailand) Samuel Jay McAlpine	Prime Bangkok	8
4	(Thailand) Panthakit Boonyachot	AUU Inter Bangkok	7
4	(Thailand) Chitchana Tuksinpila	Kasem Bundit University	7
4	(Thailand) Kittitat Jeennok	Royal Thai Army	7

== Attendances ==
=== Overall statistical table ===
Pos	Team	Total	High	Low	Average	Change
1	Bangkok	5,150	500	250	397	n/a
2	Samut Sakhon City	4,114	550	200	317	n/a
3	Thonburi United	3,367	560	127	259	n/a
4	Prime Bangkok	2,974	420	110	248	n/a
5	STK Muangnont	2,515	317	60	194	n/a
6	Chamchuri United	2,500	280	100	193	n/a
7	Royal Thai Army	2,254	285	95	188	n/a
8	North Bangkok University	2,260	340	120	174	n/a
9	Royal Thai Air Force	2,187	226	108	169	n/a
10	Samut Prakan	1,991	250	43	154	n/a
11	Nonthaburi United S.Boonmeerit	1,921	404	70	148	n/a
12	Kasem Bundit University	1,403	300	1	141	n/a
13	AUU Inter Bangkok	1,616	189	80	135	n/a
14	Siam	1,243	275	30	113	n/a
	League total	35,495	560	1	204	n/a

Source: Thai League
