= Tanpisit Kukalamo =

Thai footballer (born 1997)

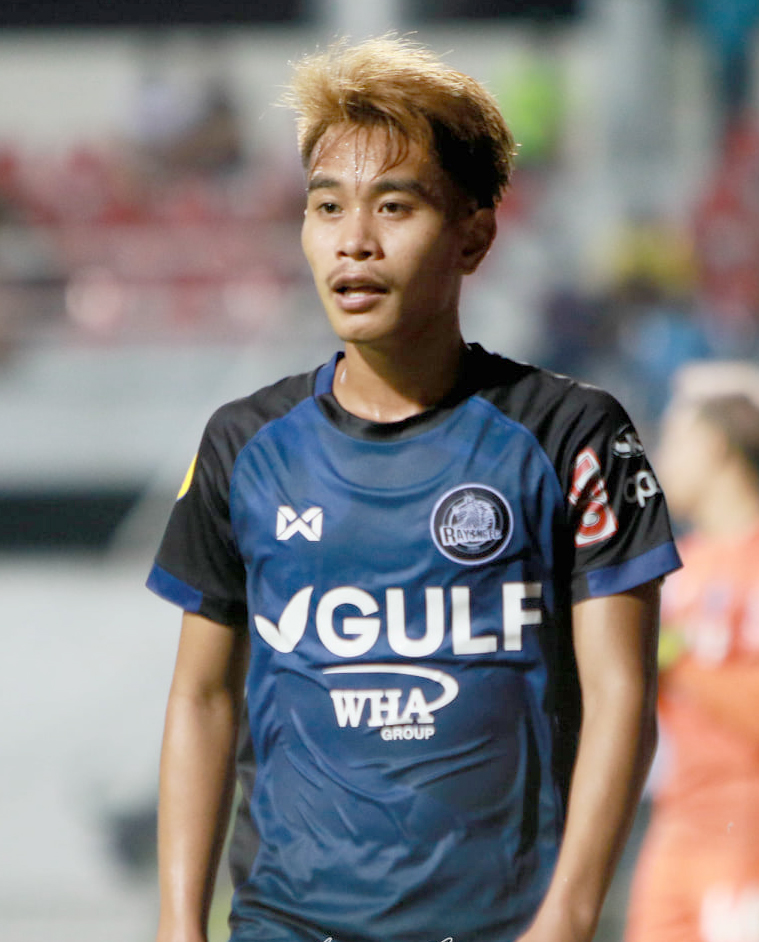
- Tanpisit Kukalamo playing for Rayong.

Personal information
- Full name: Tanpisit Kukalamo
- Date of birth: 23 August 1997 (age 29)
- Place of birth: Ubon Ratchathani, Thailand
- Height: 1.63 m (5 ft 4 in)
- Positions: Attacking midfielder; winger

Team information
- Current team: Mahasarakham SBT
- Number: 23

Youth career
- 2013: Muangthong United
- 2013–2015: Sisaket Sport School

Senior career*
Years	Team	Apps	(Gls)
2016–2017	Sisaket	0	(0)
2016–2017	→ Sisaket United (loan)	24	(2)
2018–2019	Ubon United	54	(3)
2020–2021	Khon Kaen United	11	(0)
2021–2022	Rayong	24	(2)
2022	Kasetsart	8	(1)
2023	Phitsanulok	15	(2)
2023	Uttaradit Saksiam	14	(1)
2024–	Mahasarakham SBT		

International career
2017–2018	Thailand U21	5	(0)
2019	Thailand U23	5	(0)
- * Club domestic league appearances and goals as of 6 May 2023

Tanpisit Kukalamo (Thai: ธัญพิสิษฐ์ คุขะละโม, is a Thai professional footballer who plays as an attacking midfielder, he has also been used as a winger for Mahasarakham SBT in Thai League 3.

== Honours ==
=== Club ===
Phitsanulok

- Thai League 3 Northern Region: 2022–23

=== International ===
Thailand U-23

- 2019 AFF U-22 Youth Championship: Runner up
