= André Luís (footballer, born 1986) =

Brazilian footballer

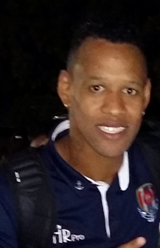

Personal information
- Full name: André Luís Leite
- Date of birth: February 19, 1986 (age 40)
- Place of birth: Jaú, Brazil
- Height: 1.81 m (5 ft 11 in)
- Position: Striker

Youth career
- 2003–2005: Cruzeiro

Senior career*
Years	Team	Apps	(Gls)
2006	→ Ipatinga (Loan)		
2007–2010	Cruzeiro		
2007–2008	→ Caxias (Loan)		
2008	→ Grêmio (Loan)	14	(1)
2009	→ Vitória (Loan)	0	(0)
2009	→ Criciúma (Loan)		
2009	→ América-RN (Loan)	13	(4)
2010	→ Veranópolis (Loan)	0	(0)
2010–2016	Boavista-RJ	0	(0)
2010–2011	→ Duque de Caxias (Loan)	29	(6)
2011	→ CRB (Loan)	3	(1)
2012	→ Ponte Preta (Loan)	20	(8)
2013	→ Mirassol (Loan)	0	(0)
2014	→ Atlético Goianiense (Loan)	29	(8)
2015	→ Suphanburi (Loan)	32	(6)
2016	→ Navy (Loan)	30	(4)
2017	Chonburi	15	(0)
2017	Navy	14	(2)
2018	Mirassol	0	(0)
2018–2019	Atlético Goianiense	33	(5)
2020	Chainat Hornbill	4	(1)
2020–2021	Lamphun Warrior	18	(5)
2021–2022	Phitsanulok	21	(7)
2022–2023	MH Nakhon Si City	24	(19)
2023–2025	Ayutthaya United	63	(25)
2025–2026	Navy	13	(6)
- * Club domestic league appearances and goals as of 26 April 2025

André Luís Leite (born February 19, 1986), or simply André Luís, is a Brazilian footballer who plays as a striker.

== Career ==
André Luís has played for several Brazilian clubs, mainly on loan from either Cruzeiro, who owned his rights from 2003 as a youth until 2010, or from Boavista-RJ between 2010 and 2016, although he never represented either of these clubs in the Brazilian National League system.

He first became notable in 2006 when he scored for Ipatinga in a Copa do Brasil quarter-final match against Santos, which Ipatinga would go on to win.

In 2008, whilst on loan to Caxias, he was re-loaned to Grêmio for the Campeonato Brasileiro Série A season. He played in 14 Série A games and scored his first goal in the game against Vitória on 23 November 2008.

In 2012 he was loaned to Ponte Preta, and made 20 appearances in Série A.

He has also been loaned to América-RN, Duque de Caxias and Atlético Goianiense to play in Campeonato Brasileiro Série B and to CRB to play in Campeonato Brasileiro Série C.

From 2015 to 2017 he spent three seasons in Thailand with Suphanburi, Royal Thai Navy and Chonburi in Thai League 1, initially on loan from Boavista-RJ, but then on permanent contracts when released by the Brazilian club.

In 2018 he returned to Brazil, initially representing Mirassol in Campeonato Paulista, but then re-signed for a second spell with Atlético Goianiense.

== Honours ==
Vitória

- Campeonato Baiano: 2009

Boavista

- Taça Rio: 2014

Atlético Goianiense

- Campeonato Goiano: 2019

Lamphun Warrior

- Thai League 3: 2020–21

MH Nakhon Si City

- Thai League 3: 2022–23
