= Alex Flávio =

Brazilian footballer (born 1993)

Personal information
- Full name: Alex Flávio Santos Luz
- Date of birth: 21 January 1993 (age 33)
- Place of birth: Salvador, Brazil
- Height: 1.86 m (6 ft 1 in)
- Position: Defender

Team information
- Current team: Lampang
- Number: 5

Youth career
- 2009–2013: Cruzeiro

Senior career*
| Years | Team | Apps | (Gls) |
| 2014–2016 | Cruzeiro | 0 | (0) |
| 2016 | → Mirassol (loan) | 1 | (0) |
| 2018 | Barretos | 17 | (1) |
| 2018 | São Caetano | 0 | (0) |
| 2019 | Penapolense | 8 | (0) |
| 2019 | Energetik-BGU Minsk | 6 | (0) |
| 2020 | Portuguesa | 1 | (0) |
| 2021 | Linense | 9 | (0) |
| 2021 | Penarol | 9 | (1) |
| 2022 | Saigon | 1 | (0) |
| 2022–2023 | Chanthaburi | 7 | (0) |
| 2023–2024 | Pattaya United | 25 | (5) |
| 2024– | Lampang | | |
- * Club domestic league appearances and goals as of 31 May 2024

Alex Flávio Santos Luz (born 21 January 1993), known as Alex Flávio, is a Brazilian professional footballer who plays for Lampang as a defender.
