= Siwa Prommas =

Thai footballer (born 1985)

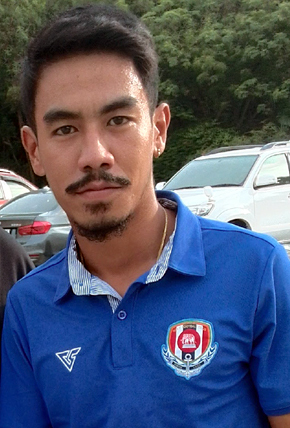

Personal information
- Full name: Siwa Prommas
- Date of birth: 14 January 1994 (age 32)
- Place of birth: Nakhon Si Thammarat, Thailand
- Position: Left midfielder

Team information
- Current team: MOF Customs United
- Number: 6

Senior career*
Years	Team	Apps	(Gls)
2013	Samut Prakan United		
2015	Rajpracha		
2016–2019	Navy	21	(0)
2020–	MOF Customs United		
- * Club domestic league appearances and goals

Siwa Prommas (Thai: ศิวะ พรหมมาศ, born 6 October 1985) is a Thai professional footballer who plays as a left midfielder for the Thai League 2 club MOF Customs United.
