= Charin Boodhad =

Thai footballer (born 1989)

Personal information
- Full name: Charin Boodhad
- Date of birth: 24 January 1989 (age 37)
- Place of birth: Khon Kaen, Thailand
- Height: 1.75 m (5 ft 9 in)
- Position: Forward

Team information
- Current team: Khon Kaen
- Number: 9

Youth career
- 2007–2008: Khon Kaen

Senior career*
Years	Team	Apps	(Gls)
2007–2014	Khon Kaen	77	(20)
2015	TTM Customs	16	(3)
2016	Loei City	19	(2)
2017	Khon Kaen	21	(4)
2018	Ayutthaya United	13	(6)
2018–2019	Khonkaen United	45	(20)
2020	Lamphun Warriors	2	(0)
2020	Muang Loei United	8	(1)
2022–2024	Chanthaburi	39	(2)
2025–	Khon Kaen	0	(0)

International career
2007–2008	Thailand U19	6	(0)
2009	Thailand U23	1	(0)
- * Club domestic league appearances and goals as of 01:32, 29 September 2017 (UTC)

Charin Bood-Hard (Thai: ชรินทร์ บุตรฮาด; born January 24, 1989) is a Thai professional footballer who plays as a forward.
