= Dauda Bortu =

Liberian footballer (born 1966)

Personal information
- Full name: Dauda Y. Bortu
- Date of birth: 4 September 1996 (age 30)
- Place of birth: Monrovia, Liberia
- Height: 1.79 m (5 ft 10 1/2 in)
- Position: Forward

Youth career
- 2008–2016: Bærum

Senior career*
Years	Team	Apps	(Gls)
2016	Bærum	0	(0)
2018	Mjølner	4	(0)
2018–2019	Singida Fountain Gate		
2019	Nybergsund	1	(0)
2019–2020	Trysil	20	(12)
2021	Nybergsund	6	(0)
2022	Løten	9	(2)
2022	Bangkok	9	(3)
2023	Prey Veng		
2023–2024	Al-Thoqbah		

International career^{‡}
2016	Liberia	1	(0)
- * Club domestic league appearances and goals as of 26 November 2022 ‡ National team caps and goals as of 16 June 2016

Dauda Bortu (born 4 September 1996) is a Liberian footballer who plays as a forward.

== International career ==
Bortu was born in Liberia, but raised and naturalized as a Norwegian citizen. He was called up and capped by the Liberia national football team in a 5–0 Africa Cup of Nations qualifying win against Djibouti.

== Club career ==
Bortu came through the youth system of Bærum SK, but was released after the 2016 season. He only featured in one 2016 Norwegian Football Cup game. After fifteen months without a club, he signed for fellow third-tier club FK Mjølner in 2018. In 2019 he moved to Nybergsund and after only one game to neighbours Nybergsund_IL-Trysil.
