= MH Nakhon Si City F.C. =

Thai former football club, based in Nakhon Si Thammarat

MH Nakhon Si City เอ็มเอช นครศรี ซิตี้
- Full name: MH Nakhon Si City Football Club
- Nicknames: The lord of the zodiac (เจ้าแห่งนักษัตร)
- Founded: 2022 as Wiang Sa City Football Club
- Dissolved: 2024; 2 years ago
- Ground: Stadium of Walailak University; Nakhon Si Thammarat, Thailand
- Capacity: 10,000

MH Nakhon Si City Football Club (Thai: สโมสรฟุตบอล เอ็มเอช นครศรี ซิตี้) is a Thai defunct football club based in Tha Sala, Nakhon Si Thammarat, Thailand.

== History ==
In early 2022, the club was established and competed in Thailand Amateur League Southern region, using the Stadium of Walailak University as ground. At the end of the season, the Wiang Sa City Football Club competing in the same division as the MH Nakhon Si City Football Club could be promoted to a higher division (T3) for next season. Still, they are not ready to compete in a higher division. So, The Wiang Sa City Football Club sold the right to the MH Nakhon Si City Football Club. They using the Stadium of Walailak University as a ground to compete for the T3 in the 2022–23 season.

In late 2022, MH Nakhon Si City competed in the Thai League 3 for the 2022–23 season. It is their first season in the professional league. The club started the season with a 4–1 home win over Phatthalung. and they ended the season with a 2–1 away win over the Phatthalung. The club has finished second place in the league of the Southern region and advanced to the national championship state. In addition, in the 2022–23 Thai FA Cup MH Nakhon Si City was defeated 0–2 by Roi Et 2018 in the qualifying round, causing them to be eliminated. and in the 2022–23 Thai League Cup MH Nakhon Si City defeated 0–2 to Buriram United in the first round, causing them to be eliminated too.

In 2024, MH Nakhon Si City announced its dissolution due to financial difficulties.

== Stadium and locations ==
Coordinates	Location	Stadium	Year
8°38′59″N 99°52′44″E	Nakhon Si Thammarat	Stadium of Walailak University	2022–2024

== Season by season record ==
Season	League									FA Cup	League Cup	T3 Cup	Top goalscorer	
Season	Division	P	W	D	L	F	A	Pts	Pos	FA Cup	League Cup	T3 Cup	Name	Goals
Wiang Sa City F.C.
2022	TA South	5	2	2	1	23	5	8	2nd	Opted out	Ineligible		(Thailand) Suphakrit Supab (Thailand) Worawut Srisawad	5
MH Nakhon Si City F.C.
2022–23	T3 South	22	13	3	6	47	22	42	2nd	QR	R1		(Brazil) André Luís	13
2023–24	T3 South	22	4	5	13	21	35	17	10th	R2	R1	R1	(Brazil) Edson dos Santos Costa Júnior	8

Champions	Runners-up	Promoted	Relegated

- P = Played
- W = Games won
- D = Games drawn
- L = Games lost
- F = Goals for
- A = Goals against
- Pts = Points
- Pos = Final position
- QR1 = First Qualifying Round
- QR2 = Second Qualifying Round
- R1 = Round 1
- R2 = Round 2
- R3 = Round 3
- R4 = Round 4
- R5 = Round 5
- R6 = Round 6
- QF = Quarter-finals
- SF = Semi-finals
- RU = Runners-up
- W = Winners

== Honours ==
=== Domestic leagues ===
- Thai League 3
  - Champions (1): 2022–23
- Thai League 3 Southern Region
  - Runners-up (1): 2022–23
