= 2022–23 Thai League 3 =

6th season of the Thai League 3

- Season: 2022–23
- Dates: 10 September 2022 – 21 May 2023
- Champions: MH Nakhon Si City
- Promoted: Chanthaburi; Dragon Pathumwan Kanchanaburi; Pattaya Dolphins United
- Relegated: Chiangrai Lanna; Sakon Nakhon; Banbueng; Thawi Watthana Samut Sakhon United; Mueang Kon D United; Siam

The 2022–23 Thai League 3 is the sixth season of the Thai League 3, the third-tier professional league for association football clubs in Thailand, since its establishment in 2017, also known as Kongsalak Plus League due to the sponsorship deal with Kongsalak Plus. A total of 75 teams would be divided into 6 regions including 12 teams in the Northern region, 13 teams in the Northeastern region, 12 teams in the Eastern region, 12 teams in the Western region, 12 teams in the Southern region, and 14 teams in the Bangkok metropolitan region.

== Regional stage ==
The number of teams in 6 regions including 12 teams in the Northern region, 13 teams in the Northeastern region, 12 teams in the Eastern region, 12 teams in the Western region, 12 teams in the Southern region, and 14 teams in the Bangkok metropolitan region.

=== Northern region ===
League table

Pos	Team	Pld	W	D	L	GF	GA	GD	Pts	Qualification or relegation
1	Phitsanulok (C, Q)	22	17	5	0	60	17	+43	56	Qualification to the National Championship stage
2	Uttaradit Saksiam (Q)	22	15	3	4	45	19	+26	48	Qualification to the National Championship stage
3	Rongseemaechaithanachotiwat Phayao	22	11	5	6	40	32	+8	38	
4	Wat Bot City	22	11	4	7	35	23	+12	37	
5	Nan (R)	22	9	6	7	22	20	+2	33 (Note: Nan ahead on head-to-head points record; Nan 6 pts, See Khwae City 0 pts.)	Relegation to the Thailand Semi-Pro League
6	See Khwae City	22	8	9	5	25	22	+3	33	
7	Maejo United	22	8	6	8	25	22	+3	30	
8	Chiangrai City	22	7	7	8	29	31	−2	28	
9	Kamphaengphet	22	5	5	12	20	34	−14	20	
10	Nakhon Mae Sot United	22	4	7	11	12	25	−13	19	
11	Kongkrailas United	22	3	5	14	15	39	−24	14	
12	Chiangrai Lanna (R)	22	2	2	18	20	64	−44	8	Relegation to the Thailand Semi-Pro League

Source: Thai League
Rules for classification: 1) Points; 2) Head-to-head points; 3) Head-to-head goal difference; 4) Head-to-head goal scored; 5) Overall goal difference; 6) Overall goal scored; 7) Fair play points; 8) Play-off without extra time).
(C) Champions; (Q) Qualified for the phase indicated; (R) Relegated

=== Northeastern region ===
League table

Pos	Team	Pld	W	D	L	GF	GA	GD	Pts	Qualification or relegation
1	Mahasarakham SBT (C, Q)	24	15	7	2	40	17	+23	52	Qualification to the National Championship stage
2	Sisaket United (Q)	24	15	6	3	34	11	+23	51	Qualification to the National Championship stage
3	Rasisalai United	24	13	7	4	54	24	+30	46	
4	Khon Kaen	24	11	8	5	36	21	+15	41	
5	Ubon Kruanapat	24	11	5	8	35	30	+5	38	
6	Muang Loei United	24	9	9	6	38	28	+10	36	
7	Surin City	24	8	10	6	26	26	0	34	
8	Khon Kaen Mordindang	24	9	5	10	36	41	−5	32	
9	Udon United	24	7	8	9	24	26	−2	29	
10	Yasothon	24	4	10	10	20	33	−13	22	
11	Nakhon Ratchasima United	24	5	5	14	19	40	−21	20	
12	Surin Khong Chee Mool	24	4	4	16	25	48	−23	16	
13	Sakon Nakhon (R)	24	0	6	18	18	60	−42	6	Relegation to the Thailand Semi-Pro League

Source: Thai League
Rules for classification: 1) Points; 2) Head-to-head points; 3) Head-to-head goal difference; 4) Head-to-head goal scored; 5) Overall goal difference; 6) Overall goal scored; 7) Fair play points; 8) Play-off without extra time).
(C) Champions; (Q) Qualified for the phase indicated; (R) Relegated

=== Eastern region ===
League table

Pos	Team	Pld	W	D	L	GF	GA	GD	Pts	Qualification or relegation
1	Pattaya Dolphins United (C, Q)	22	16	2	4	32	18	+14	50	Qualification to the National Championship stage
2	Chanthaburi (Q)	22	11	7	4	35	18	+17	40	Qualification to the National Championship stage
3	Saimit Kabin United	22	10	7	5	28	17	+11	37	
4	Chachoengsao Hi-Tek	22	10	3	9	29	28	+1	33	
5	Marines	22	8	6	8	31	31	0	30	
6	Fleet	22	8	5	9	27	28	−1	29 (Note: Fleet ahead on head-to-head points record; Fleet 6 pts, Pluakdaeng United 0 pts.)	
7	Pluakdaeng United	22	8	5	9	22	26	−4	29	
8	Bankhai United	22	5	10	7	20	26	−6	25	
9	ACDC	22	7	3	12	23	32	−9	24	
10	Assawin Kohkwang United	22	5	8	9	19	27	−8	23	
11	Navy	22	4	9	9	20	27	−7	21	
12	Banbueng (R)	22	5	5	12	19	27	−8	20	Relegation to the Thailand Semi-Pro League

Source: Thai League
Rules for classification: 1) Points; 2) Head-to-head points; 3) Head-to-head goal difference; 4) Head-to-head goal scored; 5) Overall goal difference; 6) Overall goal scored; 7) Fair play points; 8) Play-off without extra time).
(C) Champions; (Q) Qualified for the phase indicated; (R) Relegated

=== Western region ===
League table

Pos	Team	Pld	W	D	L	GF	GA	GD	Pts	Qualification or relegation
1	Dragon Pathumwan Kanchanaburi (C, Q)	22	17	1	4	69	26	+43	52 (Note: The head-to-head record is tied; Dragon Pathumwan Kanchanaburi 3 pts (GD 0), Samut Songkhram 3 pts (GD 0). Dragon Pathumwan Kanchanaburi is ahead on the overall goals difference.)	Qualification to the National Championship stage
2	Samut Songkhram (Q, R)	22	16	4	2	42	22	+20	52	Qualification to the National Championship stage and relegation to the Thailand Semi-Pro League
3	Hua Hin City	22	13	2	7	47	28	+19	41 (Note: Hua Hin City is ahead on the head-to-head points record; Hua Hin City 4 pts, Kanchanaburi City 1 pt.)	
4	Kanchanaburi City	22	12	5	5	28	21	+7	41	
5	Chainat United	22	10	5	7	36	28	+8	35	
6	Angthong	22	9	4	9	35	30	+5	31	
7	Pathumthani University	22	8	4	10	31	32	−1	28 (Note: Pathumthani University is ahead on the head-to-head record; Pathumthani University 3 pts (GD +1), Saraburi United 3 pts (GD -1).)	
8	Saraburi United	22	8	4	10	29	33	−4	28	
9	Assumption United	22	5	6	11	33	48	−15	21 (Note: Assumption United is ahead on the head-to-head points record; Assumption United 4 pts, Kanjanapat 1 pt.)	
10	Kanjanapat	22	5	6	11	30	37	−7	21	
11	Lopburi City	22	4	4	14	25	39	−14	16	
12	Thawi Watthana Samut Sakhon United (R)	22	1	3	18	13	74	−61	6	Relegation to the Thailand Semi-Pro League

Source: Thai League
Rules for classification: 1) Points; 2) Head-to-head points; 3) Head-to-head goal difference; 4) Head-to-head goal scored; 5) Overall goal difference; 6) Overall goal scored; 7) Fair play points; 8) Play-off without extra time).
(C) Champions; (Q) Qualified for the phase indicated; (R) Relegated

=== Southern region ===
League table

Pos	Team	Pld	W	D	L	GF	GA	GD	Pts	Qualification or relegation
1	Songkhla (C, Q)	22	16	5	1	46	10	+36	53	Qualification to the National Championship stage
2	MH Nakhon Si City (Q)	22	13	3	6	47	22	+25	42	Qualification to the National Championship stage
3	Young Singh Hatyai United (R)	22	10	6	6	40	22	+18	36 (Note: Young Singh Hatyai United on the head-to-head points record; Young Singh Hatyai United 4 pts, Pattani 1 pt.)	Relegation to the Thailand Semi-Pro League
4	Pattani	22	10	6	6	34	27	+7	36	
5	Nara United	22	9	6	7	30	27	+3	33	
6	Phuket Andaman	22	8	6	8	26	30	−4	30	
7	Muang Trang United	22	7	7	8	23	28	−5	28	
8	Wiang Sa Surat Thani City	22	6	7	9	24	28	−4	25	
9	Phatthalung	22	5	9	8	24	33	−9	24	
10	Jalor City	22	4	9	9	15	24	−9	21 (Note: Jalor City is ahead on the head-to-head record; Jalor City 3 pts (GD +1), Trang 3 pts (GD -1).)	
11	Trang	22	6	3	13	25	54	−29	21	
12	Mueang Kon D United (R)	22	2	5	15	13	42	−29	11	Relegation to the Thailand Semi-Pro League

Source: Thai League
Rules for classification: 1) Points; 2) Head-to-head points; 3) Head-to-head goal difference; 4) Head-to-head goal scored; 5) Overall goal difference; 6) Overall goal scored; 7) Fair play points; 8) Play-off without extra time).
(C) Champions; (Q) Qualified for the phase indicated; (R) Relegated

=== Bangkok Metropolitan region ===
League table

Pos	Team	Pld	W	D	L	GF	GA	GD	Pts	Qualification or relegation
1	North Bangkok University (C, Q)	26	15	8	3	39	16	+23	53 (Note: The mini-league points record; North Bangkok University 7 pts (GD +2), Bangkok 7 pts (GD +1), Samut Sakhon City 3 pts.)	Qualification to the National Championship stage
2	Bangkok (Q)	26	15	8	3	48	29	+19	53	Qualification to the National Championship stage
3	Samut Sakhon City	26	17	2	7	48	35	+13	53	
4	Prime Bangkok	26	13	7	6	36	22	+14	46	
5	Chamchuri United	26	10	8	8	33	31	+2	38	
6	Kasem Bundit University	26	10	6	10	31	32	−1	36 (Note: Kasem Bundit University ahead on the head-to-head points record; Kasem Bundit University 4 pts, Samut Prakan 1 pt.)	
7	Samut Prakan	26	8	12	6	33	27	+6	36	
8	Nonthaburi United S.Boonmeerit	26	9	4	13	35	36	−1	31	
9	Royal Thai Army	26	8	6	12	25	39	−14	30	
10	AUU Inter Bangkok	26	7	6	13	26	28	−2	27	
11	STK Muangnont	26	5	11	10	28	38	−10	26	
12	Thonburi United	26	6	7	13	25	35	−10	25	
13	Royal Thai Air Force	26	4	9	13	31	49	−18	21	
14	Siam (R)	26	4	8	14	17	38	−21	20	Relegation to the Thailand Semi-Pro League

Source: Thai League
Rules for classification: 1) Points; 2) Head-to-head points; 3) Head-to-head goal difference; 4) Head-to-head goal scored; 5) Overall goal difference; 6) Overall goal scored; 7) Fair play points; 8) Play-off without extra time).
(C) Champions; (Q) Qualified for the phase indicated; (R) Relegated

== National Championship stage ==
The national championship stage is the next stage from the regional stage. 1st and 2nd places of each zone qualified for this stage by being featured in 2 groups. Teams from the Northern, Northeastern, and Eastern regions would have qualified for the upper group. Meanwhile, teams from the Western, Southern, and Bangkok Metropolitan regions would have qualified for the lower group. Winners, runners-ups, and third-placed of the national championship stage would be promoted to the 2023–24 Thai League 2.

=== Group stage ===
Upper region

Pos	Team	Pld	W	D	L	GF	GA	GD	Pts	Qualification	CTB	PAT	PLK	SKU	MSK	UTD
1	Chanthaburi (P)	5	3	2	0	11	7	+4	11	Qualification to the finals and promotion to the 2023–24 Thai League 2	—	—	3–3	—	4–2	—
2	Pattaya Dolphins United (P)	5	3	1	1	9	5	+4	10 (Note: Pattaya Dolphins United is ahead on the head-to-head points record; Pattaya Dolphins United 3 pts, Phitsanulok 0 pts.)	Qualification to the third place play-offs	0–0	—	—	3–1	3–1	—
3	Phitsanulok	5	3	1	1	11	10	+1	10		—	1–3	—	1–0	—	3–2
4	Sisaket United	5	1	1	3	7	6	+1	4 (Note: The head-to-head record is tied; Sisaket United 1 pt, Mahasarakham SBT 1 pt. Sisaket United is ahead on the overall goals difference.)		1–2	—	—	—	—	5–0
5	Mahasarakham SBT	5	1	1	3	10	12	−2	4		—	—	2–3	0–0	—	5–2
6	Uttaradit Saksiam	5	1	0	4	7	15	−8	3		1–2	2–0	—	—	—	—

Source: Thai League
Rules for classification: 1) Points; 2) Head-to-head points; 3) Goal difference; 4) Goals scored;).
(P) Promoted
Notes:

Lower region

Pos	Team	Pld	W	D	L	GF	GA	GD	Pts	Qualification	MNS	DPK	SKA	NBU	BKK	SKM
1	MH Nakhon Si City (C)	5	4	1	0	11	3	+8	13	Qualification to the finals and promotion to the 2023–24 Thai League 2	—	2–1	—	—	3–0	—
2	Dragon Pathumwan Kanchanaburi (O, P)	5	3	1	1	8	2	+6	10	Qualification to the third place play-offs	—	—	4–0	—	1–0	0–0
3	Songkhla	5	2	1	2	10	8	+2	7		2–3	—	—	1–1	—	5–0
4	North Bangkok University	5	1	3	1	2	3	−1	6		0–0	0–2	—	—	—	1–0
5	Bangkok	5	1	1	3	2	7	−5	4		—	—	0–2	0–0	—	—
6	Samut Songkhram	5	0	1	4	1	11	−10	1		0–3	—	—	—	1–2	—

Source: Thai League
Rules for classification: 1) Points; 2) Head-to-head points; 3) Goal difference; 4) Goals scored;).
(C) Champions; (O) Play-off winners; (P) Promoted

=== Knockout stage ===
Third place play-offs

Team 1	Agg.	Team 2	1st leg	2nd leg
Pattaya Dolphins United	2–3	Dragon Pathumwan Kanchanaburi	1–0	1–3

Finals

Team 1	Agg.	Team 2	1st leg	2nd leg
MH Nakhon Si City	2–1	Chanthaburi	1–1	1–0

== See also ==
- 2022–23 Thai League 1
- 2022–23 Thai League 2
- 2022–23 Thai League 3 Northern Region
- 2022–23 Thai League 3 Northeastern Region
- 2022–23 Thai League 3 Eastern Region
- 2022–23 Thai League 3 Western Region
- 2022–23 Thai League 3 Southern Region
- 2022–23 Thai League 3 Bangkok Metropolitan Region
- 2022–23 Thai League 3 National Championship
- 2022–23 Thai FA Cup
- 2022–23 Thai League Cup
- 2022 Thailand Champions Cup
