= Thai League 3 =

National football league

- Organising body: Thai League Co., Ltd.
- Founded: 2017; 9 years ago
- Country: Thailand
- Confederation: AFC
- Number of clubs: 68
- Level on pyramid: 3
- Promotion to: Thai League 2
- Relegation to: Thailand Semi-pro League
- Domestic cup: Thai FA Cup
- League cup(s): Thai League Cup; Thai League 3 Cup
- Current champions: Nara United (1st title) (2025–26)
- Website: thaileague.co.th
- Current: 2026–27 Thai League 3

Thai League 3 (Thai: ไทยลีก 3), commonly known as the T3, is the third level of Thai football. It was started in 2017 First season. It is sponsored by BYD Auto and therefore officially known as the BYD Dolphin League III. In 2017, the League is divided in 2 regions and participated by 32 clubs 1st-4th clubs from 8 regions which are former members Regional League Division 2 and debutants in the season.

== History of Thai third-tier football ==
=== Division 2 era (until 2017) ===
A national third tier of Football Association of Thailand was first established when the newly created Division 2 Football League was formed in 2006 with 10 member clubs.

In 2006, the first season, 10 clubs played each other twice, with promotion going to the championship winner Chula-Sinthana FC. No relegation occurred in 2006.

In 2008, although two clubs were relegated at the end of the 2007 season, the league was again expanded the following year, to 22 clubs. 2 Groups would be created. 11 clubs in Group A and 11 clubs in Group B.

In 2009, Division 2 Football League renamed Regional League Division 2 Division 2 League was combined with Provincial League by FAT. The league was again split from 2 groups into 5 groups 52 clubs played covering the North of Thailand, North East (Isan) region, Central East Zone, Bangkok central zone and South of Thailand. The league was also renamed as the Regional League Division 2. 5 group winners would enter a championship round to determine which three teams would gain promotion to the Thai Division 1 League. Raj Pracha duly won the championship stage and were promoted with Chiangrai United of the Northern League and Narathiwat of the Southern League. The league was also created so it would combat against the rival Provincial League. With future growth moving the Pro League to join the 2nd Division.

=== Professionalization and establishment (2017) ===
Close to the end of 2016 about the upcoming professional third-tier league, referred to as either "Thai League 3" most of the sources agreed that the new league will feature around 32 clubs divided into Two Groups.

To participate a club must have held an associate membership, and then passed an inspection in order to obtain a participation licence issued by Football Association of Thailand and passed club licensing regulation.

=== Combined with Thai League 4 and change the season period (2020) ===
Due to the epidemic of Coronavirus disease 2019 also known as COVID-19, the season must be postponed to start in late 2020 and end in early 2021. In addition, the Thai League 4 had combined with the Thai League 3 and compete as Thai League 3 since this season.

== Sponsorship ==
The list below details of the Thai League 3 sponsors have been and what they called the competition:

- 2017: Euro Food (Euro Cake League Pro)
- 2018–2021: Government Savings Bank (GSB League Pro in 2018–2020, GSB League Regional Championship in 2020–2021)
- 2021–2022: Blue Dragon Online Lottey (Blue Dragon League)
- 2022–2023: Kongsalakplus Online Lottery (Kongsalakplus League)
- 2023–2024: Rising Sun Fertilizer (Rising Sun Fertilizer League)
- 2024–2025: No Main Sponsorship
- 2025–present: BYD Auto (BYD Dolphin League III)

== Thai League 3 seasons ==
Here you can view the season's in more detail.

=== 2020–21 ===
Due to the epidemic of Coronavirus disease 2019 also known as COVID-19, the season must be postponed to start in late 2020 and end in early 2021. In addition, the Thai League 4 had combined with the Thai League 3 and compete as Thai League 3 since this season and there is no relegation in this season.

== Champions history ==
=== Champions of the 3rd tier Thai football league system ===
| # | Season | Number of teams | Winner | Runner up | Third place | Fourth place |
|---|---|---|---|---|---|---|
| 1 | 2017 | 29 | Samut Sakhon | Khon Kaen | Udon Thani | Trang |
| 2 | 2018 | 28 | JL Chiangmai United | MOF Customs United | Ayutthaya United | Nara United |
| 3 | 2019 | 28 | Khon Kaen United | Nakhon Pathom United | Phrae United | Ranong United |
| 4 | 2020–21 | 72 | Lamphun Warriors | Muangkan United | Rajpracha | Udon United |
| 5 | 2021–22 | 75 | Uthai Thani | Krabi | Nakhon Si United | Phitsanulok |
| 6 | 2022–23 | 75 | MH Nakhon Si City | Chanthaburi | DP Kanchanaburi | Pattaya Dolphins United |
| 7 | 2023–24 | 72 | Bangkok | Sisaket United | Mahasarakham SBT | Phatthalung |
| 8 | 2024–25 | 69 | Rasisalai United | Songkhla | Pattani | North Bangkok University |
| 9 | 2025–26 | 68 | Nara United | Uttaradit | PT Satun | Muang Loei United |
| 10 | 2026–27 | 69 | | | | |

== Awards ==
=== Prize money ===
As of 2023-24 season

==== Regional stage ====
- Champion: 1,350,000 Baht
- Runner-up: 900,000

==== National Championship stage ====
- Champion: 1,000,000 Baht
- Runner-up: 750,000
- Third place: 500,000
- Fourth place: 250,000

== See also ==
- Football records in Thailand
