= 2020–21 Thai League 3 National Championship =

Thai League 3 National Championship
- Season: 2020–21
- Dates: 6 February 2021 – 21 March 2021

The National Championship was the next stage from the regional stage of 2020–21 Thai League 3. The winners and runners-ups of each region would qualified to this round to finding three clubs promoting to the 2021–22 Thai League 2.

== Teams ==
Locations of the 2020–21 Thai League 3 National Championship Teams
Upper Region
Lower Region

Team	Qualifying method
Lamphun Warriors	Northern region champions
Phitsanulok	Northern region play-off winner (Note: The second-placed and the third-placed of the Northern region have similar points, so they must play-off to find a team to qualified to the national championship stage.)
Udon United	Northeastern region champions
Muang Loei United	Northeastern region runners-up
Pluakdaeng United	Eastern region champions
Chachoengsao Hi-Tek	Eastern region runners-up
Muangkan United	Western region champions
Rajpracha	Western region runners-up
Songkhla	Southern region champions
Krabi	Southern region runners-up
North Bangkok University	Bangkok Metropolitan region champions
Bangkok	Bangkok Metropolitan region play-off winner (Note: The second-placed and the third-placed of the Bangkok Metropolitan region have similar points, so they must play-off to find a team to qualified to the national championship stage.)

Locations of teams in Bangkok Metropolitan region

== Qualifying play-offs ==
=== Play-off round ===
Team 1	Score	Team 2
Northern region
Maejo United	1–2	Phitsanulok
Bangkok metropolitan region
Nonthaburi United S.Boonmeerit	2–6	Bangkok

Northern region

1 February 2021
15:30 UTC+7

Maejo United	1–2	Phitsanulok
Wichaya Pornprasart 81'	Report	Koki Narita 44'; Chatchai Narkwijit 90+1'

Huai Ma Stadium, Phrae
Attendance: 0
Referee: Natee Choosuwan (Thailand)

Bangkok metropolitan region

1 February 2021
15:30 UTC+7

Nonthaburi United S.Boonmeerit	2–6	Bangkok
Dudú Lima 28', 90+2'	Report	Chaowasit Sapysakunphon 13', 67'; Bunlue Thongkliang 20'; Keegan Linderboom 75', 90+1'; Dicko Ibrahim Abou 90+3'

Thupatemi Stadium, Pathum Thani
Attendance: 0
Referee: Wiwat Jumpaoon (Thailand)

== Group stage ==
=== Upper region ===
Pos	Team	Pld	W	D	L	GF	GA	GD	Pts	Qualification	LPW	UDU	CCH	PDU	PLK	MLU
1	Lamphun Warriors (C, P)	5	4	0	1	8	5	+3	12	Qualification to the final and promotion to the 2021–22 Thai League 2	—	0–3	1–0	—	3–0	—
2	Udon United	5	3	1	1	8	3	+5	10	Qualification to the third place play-off	—	—	3–1	0–0	0–1	—
3	Chachoengsao Hi-Tek	5	3	0	2	11	5	+6	9		—	—	—	2–1	—	7–0
4	Pluakdaeng United	5	2	1	2	10	5	+5	7		1–2	—	—	—	4–1	4–0
5	Phitsanulok	5	1	1	3	2	8	−6	4		—	—	0–1	—	—	0–0
6	Muang Loei United	5	0	1	4	2	15	−13	1		1–2	1–2	—	—	—	—

Source: Thai League
Rules for classification: 1) Points; 2) Head-to-head points; 3) Goal difference; 4) Goals scored;).
(C) Champions; (P) Promoted
6 February 2021
16:00 UTC+7

Phitsanulok	0–0	Muang Loei United
	Report

Phitsanulok PAO. Stadium, Phitsanulok
Attendance: 0
Referee: Suttipong Tepa (Thailand)
6 February 2021
16:00 UTC+7

Pluakdaeng United	1–2	Lamphun Warriors
Camara Souleymane 82'	Report	Adul Lahsoh 24'; João Paulo 29'

CK Stadium, Rayong
Attendance: 0
Referee: Pawara Seejen (Thailand)
6 February 2021
16:00 UTC+7

Udon United	3–1	Chachoengsao Hi-Tek
Chawin Thirawatsri 39', 80'; Andrey Coutinho 72'	Report	Lucas Massaro Garcia Gama 43'

Stadium of Thailand National Sports University, Udon Thani Campus, Udon Thani
Attendance: 0
Referee: Phadoongkiat Piangdee (Thailand)

13 February 2021
16:00 UTC+7

Pluakdaeng United	4–0	Muang Loei United
Anuluk Yeunhan 58'; Anantachai Poodum 69'; Noah Chivuta 87'; Camara Souleymane 90+3'	Report

CK Stadium, Rayong
Attendance: 0
Referee: Alongkorn Khonwai (Thailand)
13 February 2021
16:00 UTC+7

Udon United	0–1	Phitsanulok
	Report	Pisek Sontonwat 90'

Stadium of Thailand National Sports University, Udon Thani Campus, Udon Thani
Attendance: 0
Referee: Thawatchai Sangsanit (Thailand)
13 February 2021
18:00 UTC+7

Lamphun Warriors	1–0	Chachoengsao Hi-Tek
João Paulo 6'	Report

Lamphun Provincial Stadium, Lamphun
Attendance: 0
Referee: Natthwut Nammuang (Thailand)

20 February 2021
16:00 UTC+7

Muang Loei United	1–2	Udon United
Diarra Junior Aboubacar 50'	Report	Wutthichai Marom 39'; Chawin Thirawatsri 86'

Loei Provincial Stadium, Loei
Attendance: 0
Referee: Teeramate Pooprang (Thailand)
20 February 2021
18:00 UTC+7

Lamphun Warriors	3–0	Phitsanulok
Mairon Natan Pereira Maciel Oliveira 26'; João Paulo 55'; Adisak Doungsri 68'	Report

Lamphun Provincial Stadium, Lamphun
Attendance: 0
Referee: Woottipong Ketkam (Thailand)
20 February 2021
18:30 UTC+7

Chachoengsao Hi-Tek	2–1	Pluakdaeng United
Tiwa Sangsomboon 10'; Nattaphon Phawandee 81'	Report	Alberto Moreira Gouvea 27'

Chachoengsao Municipality Stadium, Chachoengsao
Attendance: 0
Referee: Booncharoen Phochai (Thailand)

27 February 2021
16:00 UTC+7

Muang Loei United	1–2	Lamphun Warriors
Nonthawat Chaotai 30'	Report	João Paulo 6'; Mairon Natan Pereira Maciel Oliveira 62'

Loei Provincial Stadium, Loei
Attendance: 0
Referee: Suriyo Kanhachalee (Thailand)
27 February 2021
16:00 UTC+7

Phitsanulok	0–1	Chachoengsao Hi-Tek
	Report	Tiwa Sangsomboon 59'

Phitsanulok PAO. Stadium, Phitsanulok
Attendance: 0
Referee: Nattakit Chaiyakhun (Thailand)
27 February 2021
16:00 UTC+7

Udon United	0–0	Pluakdaeng United
	Report

Stadium of Thailand National Sports University, Udon Thani Campus, Udon Thani
Attendance: 0
Referee: Yuttana Sadkrathok (Thailand)

6 March 2021
16:00 UTC+7

Chachoengsao Hi-Tek	7–0	Muang Loei United
Caio da Conceição Silva 12', 40', 52' (pen.), 56', 75'; Lucas Massaro Garcia Gama 47', 90+3'	Report

Chachoengsao Municipality Stadium, Chachoengsao
Attendance: 985
Referee: Sarawut Tawiya (Thailand)
6 March 2021
16:00 UTC+7

Lamphun Warriors	0–3	Udon United
	Report	Andrey Coutinho 16'; Jardel Capistrano 27'; Weerayut Srivichai 71'

Lamphun Provincial Stadium, Lamphun
Attendance: 825
Referee: Alongkorn Khonwai (Thailand)
6 March 2021
16:00 UTC+7

Pluakdaeng United	4–1	Phitsanulok
Camara Souleymane 7', 9', 67'; Alberto Moreira Gouvea 32'	Report	Kiadtisak Nantavichianrit 85'

CK Stadium, Rayong
Attendance: 255
Referee: Virittpol Pluemsilp (Thailand)

=== Lower region ===
Pos	Team	Pld	W	D	L	GF	GA	GD	Pts	Qualification	MKU	RAJ	KBI	SON	NBU	BKK
1	Muangkan United (P)	5	3	2	0	7	1	+6	11	Qualification to the final and promotion to the 2021–22 Thai League 2	—	1–1	—	3–0	—	2–0
2	Rajpracha (O, P)	5	3	1	1	10	5	+5	10	Qualification to the third place play-off	—	—	—	2–0	1–0	—
3	Krabi	5	2	1	2	6	6	0	7		0–1	1–0	—	—	—	—
4	Songkhla	5	1	2	2	6	10	−4	5		—	—	2–2	—	2–1	2–2
5	North Bangkok University	5	1	1	3	3	5	−2	4 (Note: North Bangkok University ahead on head-to-head record; North Bangkok University 3 pts, Bangkok 0 pts.)		0–0	—	1–2	—	—	1–0
6	Bangkok	5	1	1	3	7	12	−5	4		—	3–6	2–1	—	—	—

Source: Thai League
Rules for classification: 1) Points; 2) Head-to-head points; 3) Goal difference; 4) Goals scored;).
(O) Play-off winners; (P) Promoted
Notes:
7 February 2021
16:00 UTC+7

Bangkok	3–6	Rajpracha
Chaowasit Sapysakunphon 6', 89'; Dicko Ibrahim Abou 38'	Report	Ronnachai Rangsiyo 28', 67'; Oscar Plape 34'; Anggello Machuca 54'; Sarawut Koedsri 61'; Thammayut Rakbun 88'

Thupatemi Stadium, Pathum Thani
Attendance: 0
Referee: Thitiwat Suwannarat (Thailand)
7 February 2021
16:00 UTC+7

Muangkan United	3–0	Songkhla
Amorntep Nilnoy 37'; Patiphan Pinsermsootsri 60'; Suchao Nuchnum 90+3'	Report

Kanchanaburi Provincial Stadium, Kanchanaburi
Attendance: 0
Referee: Chairat Phooalai (Thailand)
7 February 2021
16:00 UTC+7

North Bangkok University	1–2	Krabi
Weerayut Jitkuntod 43'	Report	Kroekpon Kaewmuean 5'; Santipap Yaemsaen 58' (pen.)

North Bangkok University Stadium, Pathum Thani
Attendance: 0
Referee: Suchin Khewsopa (Thailand)

14 February 2021
16:00 UTC+7

Muangkan United	1–1	Rajpracha
Naphat Thamrongsupakorn 82'	Report	Thammayut Rakbun 75'

Kanchanaburi Provincial Stadium, Kanchanaburi
Attendance: 0
Referee: Poowasak Sukunt (Thailand)
14 February 2021
16:00 UTC+7

North Bangkok University	1–0	Bangkok
Veeraphong Aon-pean 67'	Report

North Bangkok University Stadium, Pathum Thani
Attendance: 0
Referee: Narongsak Kubkun (Thailand)
14 February 2021
16:00 UTC+7

Songkhla	2–2	Krabi
Apdussalam Saman 14', 58'	Report	Koné Seydou 21'; Teerawut Churok 86'

Tinsulanon Stadium, Songkhla
Attendance: 0
Referee: Manop Lempan (Thailand)

21 February 2021
16:00 UTC+7

Krabi	0–1	Muangkan United
	Report	Montree Promsawat 90+6'

Krabi Provincial Stadium, Krabi
Attendance: 0
Referee: Mayara Day (Thailand)
21 February 2021
16:00 UTC+7

Songkhla	2–2	Bangkok
Phantep Chotikawin 35', 45+1'	Report	Chaiwat Thaewkrathok 4'; Kittiphong Pluemjai 27'

Tinsulanon Stadium, Songkhla
Attendance: 0
Referee: Chaikrit Inboonsong (Thailand)
21 February 2021
17:00 UTC+7

Rajpracha	1–0	North Bangkok University
Anggello Machuca 14'	Report

Leo Stadium, Pathum Thani
Attendance: 0
Referee: Samrit Ritkaew (Thailand)

28 February 2021
16:00 UTC+7

Bangkok	2–1	Krabi
Chaowasit Sapysakunphon 17'; Thananat Rungrampan 58'	Report	Vitor Marcelo Alves Alcântara 39'

Thupatemi Stadium, Pathum Thani
Attendance: 0
Referee: Samart Kaikaew (Thailand)
28 February 2021
16:00 UTC+7

North Bangkok University	0–0	Muangkan United
	Report

North Bangkok University Stadium, Pathum Thani
Attendance: 0
Referee: Palathip Homwarn (Thailand)
28 February 2021
17:00 UTC+7

Rajpracha	2–0	Songkhla
Anggello Machuca 59', 90+5'	Report

Leo Stadium, Pathum Thani
Attendance: 0
Referee: Wathanyu Morin (Thailand)

7 March 2021
16:00 UTC+7

Krabi	1–0	Rajpracha
Teerawut Churok 72'	Report

Krabi Provincial Stadium, Krabi
Attendance: 300
Referee: Pichit Thongjanmoon (Thailand)
7 March 2021
16:00 UTC+7

Muangkan United	2–0	Bangkok
Chakrit Rawanprakone 45+3', 72'	Report

Kanchanaburi Provincial Stadium, Kanchanaburi
Attendance: 1,286
Referee: Booncharoen Phochai (Thailand)
7 March 2021
16:00 UTC+7

Songkhla	2–1	North Bangkok University
Akkarapol Meesawat 13', 23'	Report	Nattakan Katrugsa 89'

Tinsulanon Stadium, Songkhla
Attendance: 2,139
Referee: Chaiyaporn Yongsang (Thailand)

== Knockout stage ==
Winners, runners-up, and third place of 2020–21 Thai League 3 would be promoted to the 2021–22 Thai League 2.

=== Third place play-off ===
==== Summary ====
Team 1	Agg.	Team 2	1st leg	2nd leg
Udon United	1–2	Rajpracha	1–0	0–2

==== Matches ====
13 March 2021
16:00 UTC+7

Udon United	1–0	Rajpracha
Jardel Capistrano 86'	Report

Stadium of Thailand National Sports University, Udon Thani Campus, Udon Thani
Attendance: 650
Referee: Peerasan Krataithong (Thailand)
21 March 2021
17:00 UTC+7

Rajpracha	2–0	Udon United
Anggello Machuca 17'; Thammayut Tonkham 70'	Report

Leo Stadium, Pathum Thani
Attendance: 250
Referee: Phairot Bunkamnoed (Thailand)

Rajpracha won 2–1 on aggregate.

=== Final ===
==== Summary ====
Team 1	Agg.	Team 2	1st leg	2nd leg
Lamphun Warriors	3–2	Muangkan United	2–0	1–2 (a.e.t.)

==== Matches ====
===== 1st leg =====
14 March 2021
18:00 UTC+7

Lamphun Warriors	2–0	Muangkan United
João Paulo 45', 60'	Report

Lamphun Provincial Stadium, Lamphun
Attendance: 2,073
Referee: Boonsong Prachumrak (Thailand)

Lamphun Warriors	Muangkan United

Lineups:
GK	18	(Thailand) Adisak Duangsri
CB	23	(Thailand) Witthawin Klorwuttiwat
CB	70	(Thailand) Tana Sripandorn (c)
CB	97	(Thailand) Torsak Saartaiam
RM	33	(Thailand) Thanakorn Navanit		(yellow card) 23'
CM	8	(Thailand) Akarapong Pumwisat
CM	22	(Thailand) Athit Wisetsilp
LM	15	(Thailand) Tongchai Ponang
RF	66	(Thailand) Anan Yodsangwal			(substituted off) 50'
CF	37	(Brazil) João Paulo	45', 60'		(substituted off) 90+3'
LF	14	(Thailand) Janepob Phokhi			(substituted off) 81'
Substitutes:
GK	36	(Thailand) Surasak Thong-aon
DF	13	(Thailand) Siriphong Ainta
DF	55	(Thailand) Thanadol Dumponngam
MF	24	(Thailand) Adul Namwong
MF	35	(Thailand) Siripong Kongjaopha			(substituted in) 81'
MF	99	(Thailand) Nithikon Thaninchotirath
FW	7	(Brazil) André Luís			(substituted in) 50'
FW	20	(Thailand) Nutchanon Khaowsaard
FW	26	(Thailand) Sarawut Sintupun			(substituted in) 90+3'
Head Coach:
(Thailand) Jongsarith Wuttichuay

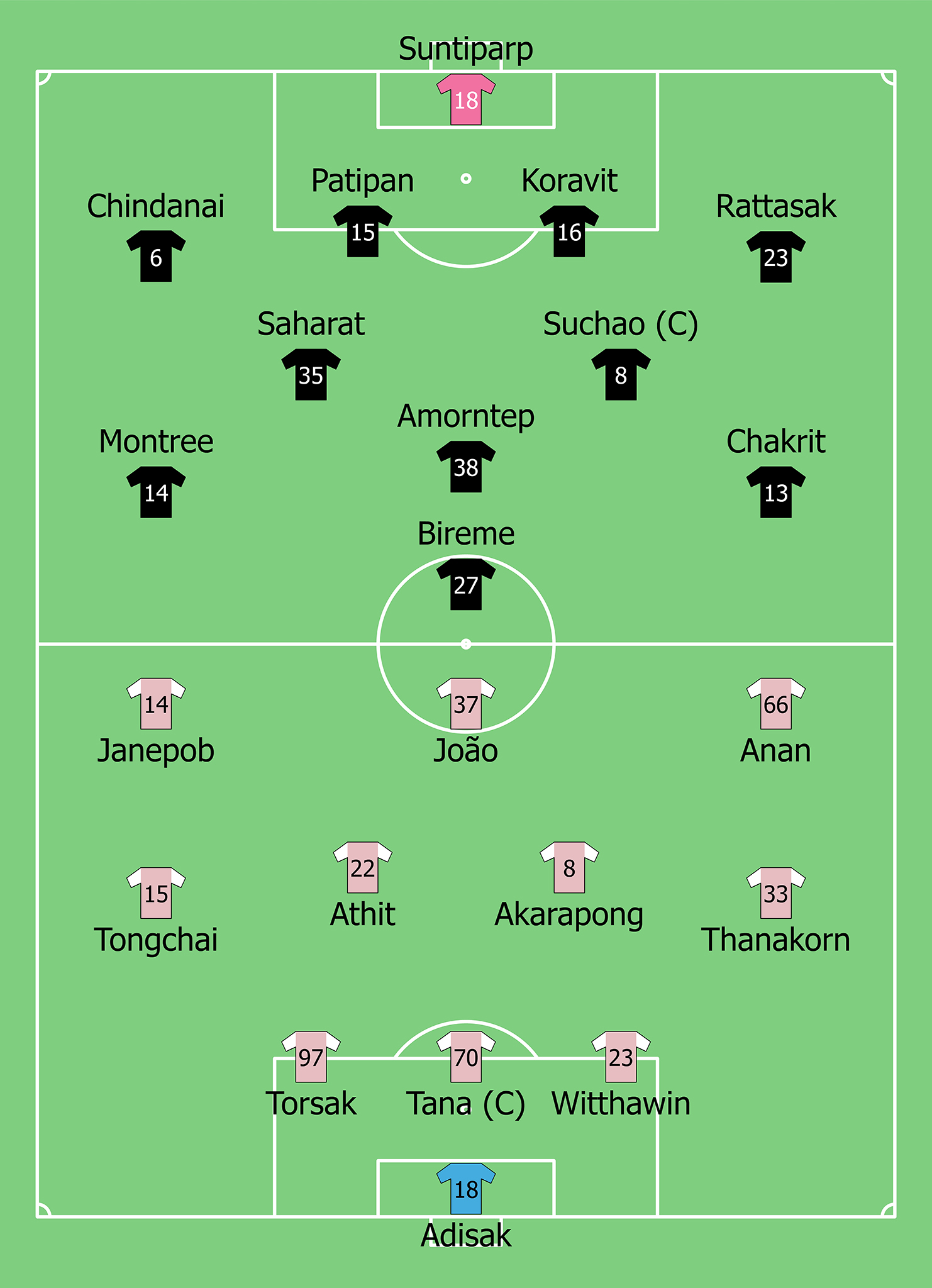

Lineups:
GK	18	(Thailand) Suntiparp Boonlkilang
RB	6	(Thailand) Chindanai Wongprasert
CB	15	(Thailand) Patipan Un-op	(yellow card) 45+2'
CB	16	(Thailand) Koravit Namwiset
LB	23	(Thailand) Rattasak Wiang-in
DM	35	(Thailand) Saharat Panmarchya
DM	8	(Thailand) Suchao Nuchnum (c)
RM	14	(Thailand) Montree Promsawat		(substituted off) 71'
AM	38	(Thailand) Amorntep Nilnoy		(substituted off) 63'
LM	13	(Thailand) Chakrit Rawanprakone		(substituted off) 56'
CF	27	(Ivory Coast) Bireme Diouf	(yellow card) 74'
Substitutes:
GK	1	(Thailand) Kantaphat Manpati
DF	4	(Thailand) Nattakrit Thongnoppakun
DF	24	(Thailand) Jiranchai Arnanatiudom
DF	48	(France) Zady Moise Gnenegbe
MF	31	(Thailand) Anusorn Phrmprasit
FW	10	(Thailand) Yuttana Ruangsuksut
FW	17	(Thailand) Patiphan Pinsermsootsri		(substituted in) 56'
FW	19	(Brazil) Stéfano Yuri		(substituted in) 71'
FW	33	(Thailand) Naphat Thamrongsupakorn		(substituted in) 63'
Head Coach:
(Thailand) Jadet Meelarp

===== 2nd leg =====
21 March 2021
15:30 UTC+7

Muangkan United	2–1 (a.e.t.)	Lamphun Warriors
Chakrit Rawanprakone 6'; Amorntep Nilnoy 23'	Report	João Paulo 101'

Kanchanaburi Provincial Stadium, Kanchanaburi
Attendance: 2,383
Referee: Atiwat Seelalo (Thailand)

Muangkan United	Lamphun Warriors

Lineups:
GK	18	(Thailand) Suntiparp Boonlkilang
RB	6	(Thailand) Chindanai Wongprasert		(yellow card) 108'
CB	48	(France) Zady Moise Gnenegbe		(yellow card) 18'
CB	16	(Thailand) Koravit Namwiset
LB	23	(Thailand) Rattasak Wiang-in			(substituted off) 100'
DM	35	(Thailand) Saharat Panmarchya		(red card) 90+5'
DM	8	(Thailand) Suchao Nuchnum (c)
RM	14	(Thailand) Montree Promsawat			(substituted off) 53'
AM	38	(Thailand) Amorntep Nilnoy	23'		(substituted off) 59'
LM	13	(Thailand) Chakrit Rawanprakone	6'		(substituted off) 91'
CF	27	(Ivory Coast) Bireme Diouf
Substitutes:
GK	1	(Thailand) Kantaphat Manpati
DF	4	(Thailand) Nattakrit Thongnoppakun			(substituted in) 100'
DF	24	(Thailand) Jiranchai Arnanatiudom
DF	99	(Thailand) Dantrai Longjumnong
MF	31	(Thailand) Anusorn Phrmprasit			(substituted in) 91'
FW	10	(Thailand) Yuttana Ruangsuksut			(substituted in) 53'
FW	17	(Thailand) Patiphan Pinsermsootsri		(red card) 120+3'	(substituted in) 59'
FW	19	(Brazil) Stéfano Yuri
FW	33	(Thailand) Naphat Thamrongsupakorn
Head Coach:
(Thailand) Jadet Meelarp

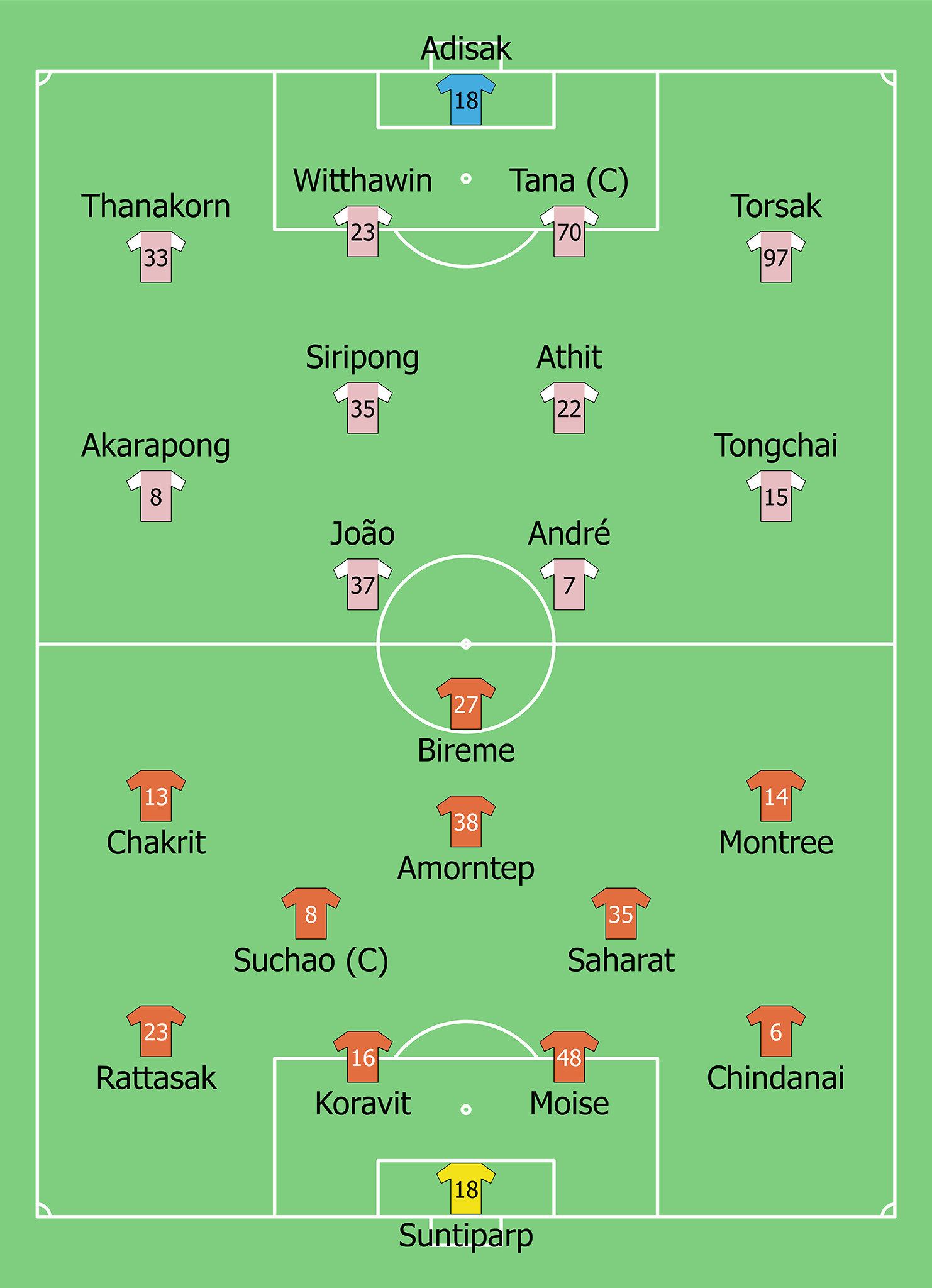

Lineups:
GK	18	(Thailand) Adisak Duangsri
RB	33	(Thailand) Thanakorn Navanit			(substituted off) 83'
CB	23	(Thailand) Witthawin Klorwuttiwat		(yellow card) 70'	(substituted off) 91'
CB	70	(Thailand) Tana Sripandorn (c)
LB	97	(Thailand) Torsak Saartaiam
RM	8	(Thailand) Akarapong Pumwisat
CM	35	(Thailand) Siripong Kongjaopha			(substituted off) 26'
CM	22	(Thailand) Athit Wisetsilp		(yellow card) 90+3'	(substituted off) 102'
LM	15	(Thailand) Tongchai Ponang
CF	37	(Brazil) João Paulo	101'
CF	7	(Brazil) André Luís		(yellow card) 103'
Substitutes:
GK	36	(Thailand) Surasak Thong-aon
DF	55	(Thailand) Thanadol Dumponngam
MF	24	(Thailand) Adul Namwong
MF	28	(Thailand) Kittisak Boontha
MF	99	(Thailand) Nithikon Thaninchotirath			(substituted in) 102'
FW	14	(Thailand) Janepob Phokhi			(substituted in) 26'
FW	19	(Brazil) Mairon Natan Pereira Maciel Oliveira			(substituted in) 91'
FW	26	(Thailand) Sarawut Sintupun			(substituted in) 83'
FW	66	(Thailand) Anan Yodsangwal
Head Coach:
(Thailand) Jongsarith Wuttichuay

Lamphun Warriors won 3–2 on aggregate.

== Statistics ==
=== Goalscorers ===
There were 99 goals scored in 36 matches, for an average of 2.75 goals per match.

7 goals

- (Brazil) João Paulo (Lamphun Warriors)

5 goals

- (Thailand) Chaowasit Sapysakunphon (Bangkok)
- (Brazil) Caio da Conceição Silva (Chachoengsao Hi-Tek)
- (Ivory Coast) Camara Souleymane (Pluakdaeng United)
- (Paraguay) Anggello Machuca (Rajpracha)

3 goals

- (Brazil) Lucas Massaro Garcia Gama (Chachoengsao Hi-Tek)
- (Thailand) Chakrit Rawanprakone (Muangkan United)
- (Thailand) Chawin Thirawatsri (Udon United)

2 goals

- (Ivory Coast) Dicko Ibrahim Abou (Bangkok)
- (New Zealand) Keegan Linderboom (Bangkok)
- (Thailand) Tiwa Sangsomboon (Chachoengsao Hi-Tek)
- (Thailand) Teerawut Churok (Krabi)
- (Brazil) Mairon Natan Pereira Maciel Oliveira (Lamphun Warriors)
- (Thailand) Amorntep Nilnoy (Muangkan United)
- (Brazil) Dudú Lima (Nonthaburi United S.Boonmeerit)
- (Brazil) Alberto Moreira Gouvea (Pluakdaeng United)
- (Thailand) Ronnachai Rangsiyo (Rajpracha)
- (Thailand) Thammayut Rakbun (Rajpracha)
- (Thailand) Akkarapol Meesawat (Songkhla)
- (Thailand) Apdussalam Saman (Songkhla)
- (Thailand) Phantep Chotikawin (Songkhla)
- (Brazil) Andrey Coutinho (Udon United)
- (Brazil) Jardel Capistrano (Udon United)

1 goal

- (Thailand) Bunlue Thongkliang (Bangkok)
- (Thailand) Chaiwat Thaewkrathok (Bangkok)
- (Thailand) Kittiphong Pluemjai (Bangkok)
- (Thailand) Thananat Rungrampan (Bangkok)
- (Thailand) Nattaphon Phawandee (Chachoengsao Hi-Tek)
- (Ivory Coast) Koné Seydou (Krabi)
- (Thailand) Kroekpon Kaewmuean (Krabi)
- (Thailand) Santipap Yaemsaen (Krabi)
- (Brazil) Vitor Marcelo Alves Alcântara (Krabi)
- (Thailand) Adisak Doungsri (Lamphun Warriors)
- (Thailand) Adul Lahsoh (Lamphun Warriors)
- (Thailand) Wichaya Pornprasart (Maejo United)
- (Ivory Coast) Diarra Junior Aboubacar (Muang Loei United)
- (Thailand) Nonthawat Chaotai (Muang Loei United)
- (Thailand) Montree Promsawat (Muangkan United)
- (Thailand) Naphat Thamrongsupakorn (Muangkan United)
- (Thailand) Patiphan Pinsermsootsri (Muangkan United)
- (Thailand) Suchao Nuchnum (Muangkan United)
- (Thailand) Nattakan Katrugsa (North Bangkok University)
- (Thailand) Veeraphong Aon-pean (North Bangkok University)
- (Thailand) Weerayut Jitkuntod (North Bangkok University)
- (Thailand) Chatchai Narkwijit (Phitsanulok)
- (Thailand) Kiadtisak Nantavichianrit (Phitsanulok)
- (Japan) Koki Narita (Phitsanulok)
- (Thailand) Pisek Sontonwat (Phitsanulok)
- (Thailand) Anantachai Poodum (Pluakdaeng United)
- (Thailand) Anuluk Yeunhan (Pluakdaeng United)
- (Zambia) Noah Chivuta (Pluakdaeng United)
- (Ghana) Oscar Plape (Rajpracha)
- (Thailand) Sarawut Koedsri (Rajpracha)
- (Thailand) Thammayut Tonkham (Rajpracha)
- (Thailand) Weerayut Srivichai (Udon United)
- (Thailand) Wutthichai Marom (Udon United)

Source: Thai League

== Teams promoted to 2021–22 Thai League 2 ==
- Lamphun Warriors (champions)
- Muangkan United (runners-up)
- Rajpracha (third-placed)
