= 2020–21 Thai League 3 Western Region =

Thai League 3 Western Region
- Season: 2020–21
- Dates: 3 October 2020 – 3 January 2021
- Champions: Muangkan United
- T3 National Championship: Muangkan United; Rajpracha
- Matches: 101
- Goals: 270 (2.67 per match)
- Top goalscorer: (Ivory Coast) Bireme Diouf (17 goals; Muangkan United)
- Biggest home win: 10 goals difference Muangkan United 10–0 Thawi Watthana Samut Sakhon United (25 October 2020)
- Biggest away win: 6 goals difference Kanjanapat 0–6 Angthong (21 October 2020); Kanjanapat 0–6 Rajpracha (4 November 2020)
- Highest scoring: 10 goals Muangkan United 10–0 Thawi Watthana Samut Sakhon United (25 October 2020)
- Longest winning run: 5 matches Muangkan United
- Longest unbeaten run: 10 matches Muangkan United; Rajpracha
- Longest winless run: 11 matches Thawi Watthana Samut Sakhon United
- Longest losing run: 7 matches Thawi Watthana Samut Sakhon United

The 2020–21 Thai League 3 Western region is a region in the regional stage of the 2020–21 Thai League 3. Due to the COVID-19 pandemic, the season must be postponed to start in late 2020 and end in early 2021. In addition, the Thai League 4 had combined with the Thai League 3 and compete as Thai League 3 since this season and there is no relegation in this season. A total of 12 teams located in Western, central, and Bangkok Metropolitan Region of Thailand will compete in the league of the Western region.

In late December 2020, COVID-19 had spread again in Thailand, the FA Thailand must abruptly end the regional stage of the Thai League 3.

== Teams ==
=== Number of teams by province ===
Position	Province	Number	Teams
1	Bangkok	2	Assumption United and Thawi Watthana Samut Sakhon United
1	Kanchanaburi	2	Muangkan United and Singha Golden Bells Kanchanaburi
1	Pathum Thani	2	Kanjanapat and Rajpracha
1	Phra Nakhon Si Ayutthaya	2	Bang Pa-in Ayutthaya and Pathumthani University
2	Ang Thong	1	Angthong
2	Prachuap Khiri Khan	1	Hua Hin City
2	Samut Songkhram	1	Samut Songkhram
2	Saraburi	1	Saraburi United

=== Stadiums and locations ===
Locations of the 2020–21 Thai League 3 Western region teams

Team	Location	Stadium	Coordinates
Angthong	Angthong (Mueang)	Angthong PAO. Stadium	14°37′45″N 100°27′07″E
Assumption United	Bangkok (Bang Khae)	Wongprachanukul Stadium	13°44′03″N 100°22′14″E
Bang Pa-in Ayutthaya	Ayutthaya (Bang Pa-in)	Bang Pa-in School Stadium	14°14′14″N 100°35′01″E
Hua Hin City	Prachuap Khiri Khan (Hua Hin)	Hua Hin Municipal Stadium	12°31′37″N 99°58′10″E
Kanjanapat	Pathum Thani (Thanyaburi)	Stadium of Rajamangala University of Technology Thanyaburi	14°02′06″N 100°43′23″E
Muangkan United	Kanchanaburi (Mueang)	Kanchanaburi Provincial Stadium	14°02′59″N 99°30′10″E
Pathumthani University	Ayutthaya (Bang Sai)	Ratchakram Stadium	14°10′09″N 100°31′45″E
Rajpracha	Pathum Thani (Thanyaburi)	Leo Stadium	14°00′02″N 100°40′46″E
Samut Songkhram	Samut Songkhram (Mueang)	Samut Songkhram PAO. Stadium	13°24′51″N 100°00′00″E
Saraburi United	Saraburi (Muaklek)	Stadium of National Sports Training Center, Muaklek	14°37′41″N 101°10′06″E
Singha Golden Bells Kanchanaburi	Kanchanaburi (Mueang)	Kanchanaburi Municipality Stadium	14°01′13″N 99°31′17″E
Thawi Watthana Samut Sakhon United	Bangkok (Thawi Watthana)	Bangkokthonburi University Stadium	13°46′09″N 100°20′44″E

Locations of teams in Bangkok Metropolitan region

=== Foreign players ===
A T3 team could register 3 foreign players from foreign players all around the world. A team can use 3 foreign players on the field in each game.

Note :
(substituted off) : players who released during second leg transfer window;
(substituted in) : players who registered during second leg transfer window.

AFC member countries players.
CAF member countries players.
CONCACAF member countries players.
CONMEBOL member countries players.
OFC member countries players.
UEFA member countries players.
No foreign player registered.

Club	Leg	Player 1	Player 2	Player 3
Angthong	1st	(Brazil) Cláudio (substituted off)	(Brazil) Moacir da Rosa Wilmsen	(Egypt) Isalam Osama Ibrahim Abdelkarim
Angthong	2nd	(Brazil) Allan Machado de Souza Rosa (substituted in)	(Brazil) Moacir da Rosa Wilmsen	(Egypt) Isalam Osama Ibrahim Abdelkarim
Assumption United	1st
Assumption United	2nd
Bang Pa-in Ayutthaya	1st	(Brazil) Diniz Molarinho Roque Rafael (substituted off)	(South Korea) Park Hyun-woo (substituted off)
Bang Pa-in Ayutthaya	2nd
Hua Hin City	1st	(Ghana) Daniel Measah	(South Korea) Yun Jin-soo
Hua Hin City	2nd	(Ghana) Daniel Measah	(South Korea) Yun Jin-soo
Kanjanapat	1st	(Egypt) Basam Radwan Mahmoud Mohamed Afify (substituted off)	(Guinea) Sylla Sekou Nana (substituted off)
Kanjanapat	2nd	(Egypt) Mohamed Abdelfattah (substituted in)	(South Africa) Rhoda Matthew Kenneth (substituted in)
Muangkan United	1st	(Brazil) Ailton (substituted off)	(Cameroon) Florent Obama (substituted off)	(Ivory Coast) Bireme Diouf
Muangkan United	2nd	(Brazil) Stéfano Yuri (substituted in)	(France) Zady Moise Gnenegbe (substituted in)	(Ivory Coast) Bireme Diouf
Pathumthani University	1st			(Ivory Coast) Soumahoro Mafa Ivoirienne
Pathumthani University	2nd	(Nigeria) Efe Obode (substituted in)	(Republic of the Congo) Itubu Adeno Kevin (substituted in)	(Ivory Coast) Soumahoro Mafa Ivoirienne
Rajpracha	1st	(Brazil) Felipe Wallace do Nascimento (substituted off)	(Brazil) Rosalvo Cândido Rosa Júnior (substituted off)	(Paraguay) Anggello Machuca
Rajpracha	2nd	(Ghana) Oscar Plape (substituted in)	(Iran) Eiman Kaabi (substituted in)	(Paraguay) Anggello Machuca
Samut Songkhram	1st	(Ghana) Amagwe Clement Nana (substituted off)	(Myanmar) Tun Lin (substituted off)	(Argentina) Lucas Daniel Echenique
Samut Songkhram	2nd	(Guinea) Abdoul Karim Sylla (substituted in)	(Republic of the Congo) Simba Masala (substituted in)	(Argentina) Lucas Daniel Echenique
Saraburi United	1st	(Zambia) Noah Chivuta (substituted off)	(Brazil) Caíque Freitas Ribeiro	(Japan) Ryo Tomigahara
Saraburi United	2nd	(Cameroon) Ngouafack Samuel (substituted in)	(Brazil) Caíque Freitas Ribeiro	(Japan) Ryo Tomigahara
Singha Golden Bells Kanchanaburi	1st	(Japan) Daiki Konomura (substituted off)	(Ghana) Ozor Enoch
Singha Golden Bells Kanchanaburi	2nd		(Ghana) Ozor Enoch
Thawi Watthana Samut Sakhon United	1st
Thawi Watthana Samut Sakhon United	2nd	(Japan) Masaki Mikami (substituted in)

== League table ==
=== Standings ===
Pos	Team	Pld	W	D	L	GF	GA	GD	Pts	Qualification or relegation
1	Muangkan United (Q)	17	13	3	1	50	13	+37	42	Qualification to the National Championship stage
2	Rajpracha (Q)	17	12	3	2	40	10	+30	39	Qualification to the National Championship stage
3	Angthong	17	12	2	3	36	10	+26	38	
4	Singha Golden Bells Kanchanaburi	17	6	6	5	19	22	−3	24	
5	Bang Pa-in Ayutthaya	16	7	2	7	21	17	+4	23	
6	Assumption United	17	6	2	9	19	20	−1	20	
7	Pathumthani University	17	6	2	9	14	23	−9	20	
8	Saraburi United	17	4	7	6	19	34	−15	19	
9	Hua Hin City	17	4	5	8	16	27	−11	17	
10	Samut Songkhram	16	4	5	7	12	23	−11	17	
11	Kanjanapat	17	3	3	11	9	33	−24	12	
12	Thawi Watthana Samut Sakhon United	17	3	2	12	15	38	−23	11	

Source: Thai League
Rules for classification: 1) Points; 2) Head-to-head points; 3) Head-to-head goal difference; 4) Head-to-head goal scored; 5) Overall goal difference; 6) Overall goal scored; 7) Fair play points; 8) Play-off without extra time).
(Q) Qualified for the phase indicated

=== Positions by round ===
Team ╲ Round	1	2	3	4	5	6	7	8	9	10	11	12	13	14	15	16	17
Muangkan United	2	2	1	1	1	1	1	1	3	1	1	2	1	1	1	1	1
Rajpracha	1	4	3	3	3	3	2	2	1	2	2	3	3	3	3	3	2
Angthong	4	1	2	2	2	2	3	3	2	3	3	1	2	2	2	2	3
Singha Golden Bells Kanchanaburi	3	3	4	6	9	7	6	7	5	7	5	4	5	5	5	5	4
Bang Pa-in Ayutthaya	8	6	10	8	6	9	8	9	6	4	4	5	4	4	4	4	5
Assumption United	7	10	5	5	5	4	7	4	4	5	7	7	6	6	8	8	6
Pathumthani University	5	8	7	4	4	6	5	5	7	9	9	10	10	10	10	9	7
Saraburi United	6	9	8	10	10	8	9	8	9	8	8	8	7	7	6	6	8
Hua Hin City	10	12	12	11	7	11	10	10	10	10	10	9	9	9	9	10	9
Samut Songkhram	11	7	6	9	8	5	4	6	8	6	6	6	8	8	7	7	10
Kanjanapat	9	11	11	12	12	10	11	11	11	11	11	11	11	11	11	11	11
Thawi Watthana Samut Sakhon United	12	5	9	7	11	12	12	12	12	12	12	12	12	12	12	12	12

Source: Thai League
= Qualification to the National Championship stage

=== Results by round ===
Team ╲ Round	1	2	3	4	5	6	7	8	9	10	11	12	13	14	15	16	17
Muangkan United	W	W	W	W	W	D	L	W	D	W	W	D	W	W	W	W	W
Rajpracha	W	L	W	W	W	D	W	W	W	D	W	D	L	W	W	W	W
Angthong	W	W	L	W	W	W	L	W	W	D	W	W	L	W	W	W	D
Singha Golden Bells Kanchanaburi	W	D	D	L	L	D	W	D	W	L	W	W	D	L	W	L	D
Bang Pa-in Ayutthaya	L	W	L	D	D	L	W	L	W	W	W	L	W	W	L	L	N
Assumption United	L	D	W	D	L	W	L	W	W	L	L	L	W	L	L	L	W
Pathumthani University	W	L	D	W	L	L	W	D	L	L	L	L	L	W	L	W	W
Saraburi United	W	L	D	L	D	D	D	W	L	W	L	D	W	L	D	L	D
Hua Hin City	L	L	D	D	W	L	D	L	L	W	D	W	W	L	L	L	D
Samut Songkhram	L	W	D	L	D	W	W	L	L	W	D	L	D	L	D	L	N
Kanjanapat	L	L	D	L	D	W	L	L	D	L	L	W	L	L	W	L	L
Thawi Watthana Samut Sakhon United	L	W	L	D	L	L	L	L	L	L	L	D	L	W	L	W	L

Source: Thai League
N = No match; W = Won; D = Drawn; L = Lost

=== Results ===
Home \ Away	ANG	ASU	BPA	HHC	KJP	MKU	PTU	RAJ	SKM	SRB	SGB	TWS
Angthong	—	2–0	—	5–0	3–0	2–3	4–1	—	2–0	2–0	0–0	2–0
Assumption United	0–1	—	0–0	1–0	1–0	—	1–2	0–1	6–0	0–1	1–1	2–1
Bang Pa-in Ayutthaya	0–1	1–0	—	2–3	2–3	4–3	—	1–2	0–1	—	4–0	—
Hua Hin City	1–4	—	0–1	—	2–0	—	1–0	—	0–0	1–1	1–0	1–1
Kanjanapat	0–6	—	0–0	—	—	1–1	—	0–6	1–2	0–1	0–1	0–1
Muangkan United	3–0	3–1	1–0	2–0	—	—	3–1	1–0	—	7–0	3–1	10–0
Pathumthani University	0–1	0–1	0–2	1–1	1–0	—	—	0–2	1–0	—	1–1	1–0
Rajpracha	0–0	—	0–1	4–2	5–0	1–1	2–1	—	2–0	7–2	4–0	—
Samut Songkhram	—	1–0	—	—	0–1	0–2	1–2	—	—	1–1	1–1	2–1
Saraburi United	—	—	2–1	1–1	0–0	1–3	3–1	1–1	2–2	—	—	2–2
Singha Golden Bells Kanchanaburi	2–1	4–1	—	2–1	—	1–1	—	0–1	1–1	2–1	—	2–0
Thawi Watthana Samut Sakhon United	—	2–4	1–2	2–1	1–3	0–3	0–1	0–2	—	3–0	—	—

Source: Thai League
Legend: Blue = home team win; Yellow = draw; Red = away team win.
For upcoming matches, an "a" indicates there is an article about the rivalry between the two participants.

== Season statistics ==
=== Top scorers ===
As of 3 January 2021.

Rank	Player	Club	Goals
1	(Ivory Coast) Bireme Diouf	Muangkan United	17
2	(Thailand) Ronnachai Rangsiyo	Rajpracha	12
3	(Thailand) Sirichai Lamphuttha	Angthong	10
3	(Brazil) Caíque Freitas Ribeiro	Saraburi United	10
5	(Brazil) Moacir da Rosa Wilmsen	Angthong	8
5	(Thailand) Thawatchai Wisetdee	Thawi Watthana Samut Sakhon United	8
7	(Thailand) Kueanun Junumpai	Bang Pa-in Ayutthaya	6
7	(Thailand) Suchao Nuchnum	Muangkan United	6
7	(Paraguay) Anggello Machuca	Rajpracha	6

=== Hat-tricks ===
Player	For	Against	Result	Date
(Thailand) Arnon Prasongporn	Assumption United	Thawi Watthana Samut Sakhon United	4–2 (A)	18 October 2020
(Brazil) Moacir da Rosa Wilmsen	Angthong	Kanjanapat	6–0 (A)	21 October 2020
(Thailand) Suchao Nuchnum	Muangkan United	Thawi Watthana Samut Sakhon United	10–0 (H)	25 October 2020
(Thailand) Sirichai Lamphuttha	Angthong	Hua Hin City	4–1 (A)	27 December 2020
(Thailand) Chokanan Saima-in	Assumption United	Samut Songkhram	6–0 (H)	3 January 2021

Notes: (H) = Home team; (A) = Away team

=== Clean sheets ===
As of 3 January 2021.

Rank	Player	Club	Clean sheets
1	(Thailand) Atthapon Rutham	Angthong	12
2	(Thailand) Kiadtiphon Udom	Rajpracha	6
3	(Thailand) Suntiparp Boonlkliang	Muangkan United	5
4	(Thailand) Khanaphod Kadee	Bang Pa-in Ayutthaya	4
4	(Thailand) Natchaphon Dechwan	Hua Hin City	4

== See also ==
- 2020–21 Thai League 1
- 2020–21 Thai League 2
- 2020–21 Thai League 3
- 2020–21 Thai League 3 Northern Region
- 2020–21 Thai League 3 Northeastern Region
- 2020–21 Thai League 3 Eastern Region
- 2020–21 Thai League 3 Southern Region
- 2020–21 Thai League 3 Bangkok Metropolitan Region
- 2020–21 Thai League 3 National Championship
- 2020–21 Thai FA Cup
- 2020 Thailand Champions Cup
