= 2020–21 Thai League 3 Eastern Region =

Thai League 3 Eastern Region
- Season: 2020–21
- Dates: 3 October 2020 – 3 January 2021
- Champions: Pluakdaeng United
- T3 National Championship: Pluakdaeng United; Chachoengsao Hi-Tek
- Matches: 98
- Goals: 277 (2.83 per match)
- Top goalscorer: (Republic of the Congo) Burnel Okana-Stazi (17 goals; Bankhai United)
- Biggest home win: 6 goals difference Chachoengsao Hi-Tek 6–0 Pattaya Discovery United (26 December 2020)
- Biggest away win: 4 goals difference Sakaeo 1–5 Bankhai United (4 November 2020); Chanthaburi 1–5 Marines Eureka (19 December 2020)
- Highest scoring: 9 goals Pluakdaeng United 7–2 Pattaya Discovery United (11 October 2020)
- Longest winning run: 7 matches Bankhai United; Pluakdaeng United
- Longest unbeaten run: 8 matches Chachoengsao Hi-Tek
- Longest winless run: 8 matches ACDC; Chanthaburi; Royal Thai Fleet; Sakaeo
- Longest losing run: 6 matches Royal Thai Fleet

The 2020–21 Thai League 3 Eastern region is a region in the regional stage of the 2020–21 Thai League 3. Due to the COVID-19 pandemic, the season must be postponed to start in late 2020 and end in early 2021. In addition, the Thai League 4 had combined with the Thai League 3 and compete as Thai League 3 since this season and there is no relegation in this season. A total of 12 teams located in Eastern of Thailand will compete in the league of the Eastern region.

In late December 2020, COVID-19 had spread again in Thailand, the FA Thailand must abruptly end the regional stage of the Thai League 3.

== Teams ==
=== Number of teams by province ===
Position	Province	Number	Teams
1	Chonburi	5	ACDC, Banbueng, Marines Eureka, Pattaya Discovery United, and Royal Thai Fleet
2	Chanthaburi	2	Assawin Kohkwang United and Chanthaburi
2	Rayong	2	Bankhai United and Pluakdaeng United
3	Chachoengsao	1	Chachoengsao Hi-Tek
3	Prachinburi	1	Saimit Kabin United
3	Sa Kaeo	1	Sakaeo

=== Stadiums and locations ===
Locations of the 2020–21 Thai League 3 Eastern region teams

Team	Location	Stadium	Coordinates
ACDC	Chonburi (Sattahip)	Battleship Stadium	12°39′39″N 100°55′24″E
Assawin Kohkwang United	Chanthaburi (Mueang)	Rambhai Barni Rajabhat University Stadium	12°39′50″N 102°06′06″E
Banbueng	Chonburi (Mueang)	Stadium of Thailand National Sports University, Chonburi Campus	13°24′40″N 100°59′37″E
Bankhai United	Rayong (Ban Khai)	Wai Krong Stadium	12°48′26″N 101°17′51″E
Chachoengsao Hi-Tek	Chachoengsao (Mueang)	Chachoengsao Municipality Stadium	13°41′24″N 101°04′06″E
Chanthaburi	Chanthaburi (Mueang)	Chanthaburi Provincial Stadium	12°36′36″N 102°06′20″E
Marines Eureka	Chonburi (Sattahip)	Sattahip Navy Stadium	12°39′49″N 100°56′09″E
Pattaya Discovery United	Chonburi (Bang Lamung)	Nong Prue Stadium	12°55′27″N 100°56′14″E
Pluakdaeng United	Rayong (Pluak Daeng)	CK Stadium	12°59′04″N 101°12′55″E
Royal Thai Fleet	Chonburi (Sattahip)	Battleship Stadium	12°39′39″N 100°55′24″E
Saimit Kabin United	Prachinburi (Kabin Buri)	Nomklao Maharat Stadium	13°59′20″N 101°43′25″E
Sakaeo	Sakaeo (Mueang)	Sakaeo PAO. Stadium	13°46′21″N 102°10′43″E

=== Foreign players ===
A T3 team could register 3 foreign players from foreign players all around the world. A team can use 3 foreign players on the field in each game.

Note :
(substituted off) : players who released during second leg transfer window;
(substituted in) : players who registered during second leg transfer window.

AFC member countries players.
CAF member countries players.
CONCACAF member countries players.
CONMEBOL member countries players.
OFC member countries players.
UEFA member countries players.
No foreign player registered.

Club	Leg	Player 1	Player 2	Player 3
ACDC	1st
ACDC	2nd
Assawin Kohkwang United	1st		(Ghana) Amidu Jamal	(Togo) Abasso Uro-Nimini
Assawin Kohkwang United	2nd	(Guinea) Sako Seydou (substituted in)	(Ghana) Amidu Jamal	(Togo) Abasso Uro-Nimini
Banbueng	1st	(Cameroon) Elvis Job	(Trinidad and Tobago) Seon Power
Banbueng	2nd	(Cameroon) Elvis Job	(Trinidad and Tobago) Seon Power
Bankhai United	1st	(Ivory Coast) Oumar Sanou (substituted off)	(Brazil) Moreira	(Republic of the Congo) Burnel Okana-Stazi
Bankhai United	2nd	(Brazil) Thiago (substituted in)	(Brazil) Moreira	(Republic of the Congo) Burnel Okana-Stazi
Chachoengsao Hi-Tek	1st		(Brazil) Lucas Massaro Garcia Gama	(Cameroon) Nyamsi Jacques Dominique
Chachoengsao Hi-Tek	2nd	(Brazil) Caio da Conceição Silva (substituted in)	(Brazil) Lucas Massaro Garcia Gama	(Cameroon) Nyamsi Jacques Dominique
Chanthaburi	1st	(Argentina) Jonathan Ricardo Ezequiel Cardozo
Chanthaburi	2nd	(Argentina) Jonathan Ricardo Ezequiel Cardozo
Marines Eureka	1st
Marines Eureka	2nd
Pattaya Discovery United	1st	(Ivory Coast) Kourouma Mohamed (substituted off)
Pattaya Discovery United	2nd
Pluakdaeng United	1st		(Kenya) Melvin Macharia Shashu (substituted off)	(Brazil) Alberto Moreira Gouvea
Pluakdaeng United	2nd	(Ivory Coast) Camara Souleymane (substituted in)	(Zambia) Noah Chivuta (substituted in)	(Brazil) Alberto Moreira Gouvea
Royal Thai Fleet	1st
Royal Thai Fleet	2nd
Saimit Kabin United	1st
Saimit Kabin United	2nd	(Iran) Taghi Nayebi Mirzaagha (substituted in)
Sakaeo	1st			(Cameroon) Sandjo Kwayep Jislin Aime
Sakaeo	2nd	(Ivory Coast) Ange Didier Merveil Kere (substituted in)	(Ghana) Amagwe Clement Nana (substituted in)	(Cameroon) Sandjo Kwayep Jislin Aime

== League table ==
=== Standings ===
Pos	Team	Pld	W	D	L	GF	GA	GD	Pts	Qualification or relegation
1	Pluakdaeng United (Q)	17	12	3	2	43	15	+28	39	Qualification to the National Championship stage
2	Chachoengsao Hi-Tek (Q)	17	11	5	1	37	9	+28	38	Qualification to the National Championship stage
3	Bankhai United	16	10	1	5	33	16	+17	31	
4	Banbueng	16	7	4	5	29	28	+1	25	
5	Saimit Kabin United	17	6	7	4	13	17	−4	25	
6	Marines Eureka	17	7	3	7	21	22	−1	24	
7	Assawin Kohkwang United	16	6	3	7	23	28	−5	21	
8	Pattaya Discovery United	16	4	5	7	21	34	−13	17	
9	ACDC	16	4	3	9	15	22	−7	15	
10	Sakaeo	15	3	4	8	16	29	−13	13	
11	Chanthaburi	16	2	5	9	13	26	−13	11	
12	Royal Thai Fleet	17	2	5	10	13	31	−18	11	

Source: Thai League
Rules for classification: 1) Points; 2) Head-to-head points; 3) Head-to-head goal difference; 4) Head-to-head goal scored; 5) Overall goal difference; 6) Overall goal scored; 7) Fair play points; 8) Play-off without extra time).
(Q) Qualified for the phase indicated

=== Positions by round ===
Team ╲ Round	1	2	3	4	5	6	7	8	9	10	11	12	13	14	15	16	17
Pluakdaeng United	2	1	1	1	1	1	1	1	1	1	1	1	1	1	1	1	1
Chachoengsao Hi-Tek	1	3	3	2	2	2	2	2	2	2	3	3	3	2	2	2	2
Bankhai United	3	2	2	5	7	9	7	5	5	4	2	2	2	3	3	3	3
Banbueng	5	8	7	8	9	11	9	7	6	6	6	6	5	5	4	4	4
Saimit Kabin United	8	4	4	3	3	3	3	3	4	5	4	4	4	6	5	5	5
Marines Eureka	9	12	12	11	8	5	8	9	8	7	7	7	6	4	6	6	6
Assawin Kohkwang United	12	7	10	6	4	4	6	4	3	3	5	5	7	7	7	7	7
Pattaya Discovery United	6	11	9	10	5	6	4	6	7	8	8	8	8	8	8	8	8
ACDC	10	9	8	4	6	8	5	8	9	9	9	9	9	9	10	10	9
Sakaeo	11	5	5	9	11	7	10	10	10	11	11	11	11	12	9	9	10
Chanthaburi	4	6	6	7	10	10	11	11	11	10	10	10	10	10	11	11	11
Royal Thai Fleet	7	10	11	12	12	12	12	12	12	12	12	12	12	11	12	12	12

Source: Thai League
= Qualification to the National Championship stage

=== Results by round ===
Team ╲ Round	1	2	3	4	5	6	7	8	9	10	11	12	13	14	15	16	17
Pluakdaeng United	W	W	W	W	W	W	W	L	D	W	D	W	L	W	W	D	W
Chachoengsao Hi-Tek	W	D	D	W	W	D	W	D	L	W	D	W	W	W	W	W	W
Bankhai United	W	W	L	L	L	L	W	W	W	W	W	W	W	L	W	D	N
Banbueng	D	L	W	L	D	L	W	W	W	L	W	L	W	W	D	D	N
Saimit Kabin United	D	W	D	W	D	W	L	W	D	L	W	D	W	L	D	D	L
Marines Eureka	L	L	L	W	W	W	L	D	D	W	L	W	W	W	L	D	L
Assawin Kohkwang United	L	W	L	W	W	D	L	W	W	W	L	L	L	D	L	D	N
Pattaya Discovery United	D	L	W	L	W	D	W	D	L	L	D	L	L	W	D	L	N
ACDC	L	D	W	W	L	L	W	L	L	L	D	L	L	L	D	W	N
Sakaeo	L	W	D	L	L	W	L	L	D	L	D	D	L	L	W	N	N
Chanthaburi	W	L	D	L	L	D	L	L	L	W	D	D	L	L	L	D	N
Royal Thai Fleet	D	L	L	L	L	L	L	D	W	L	L	D	W	D	L	D	L

Source: Thai League
N = No match; W = Won; D = Drawn; L = Lost

=== Results ===
Home \ Away	ACD	AKU	BBG	BKU	CCH	CTB	MRE	PAT	PDU	RTF	SKU	SAK
ACDC	—	0–1	2–1	—	1–1	2–2	2–0	1–3	—	0–1	—	—
Assawin Kohkwang United	—	—	1–2	1–4	—	1–1	1–0	—	2–1	4–2	2–1	3–1
Banbueng	3–2	5–3	—	2–4	1–0	—	—	—	3–3	1–0	0–0	2–1
Bankhai United	2–0	—	3–2	—	0–1	2–0	2–0	3–0	0–2	—	0–1	—
Chachoengsao Hi-Tek	3–1	4–1	—	2–1	—	2–1	—	6–0	—	1–0	4–0	4–0
Chanthaburi	—	0–0	1–3	—	0–0	—	1–5	—	0–2	0–1	0–0	2–0
Marines Eureka	0–2	1–0	1–0	1–0	0–0	3–2	—	3–0	1–3	2–2	—	—
Pattaya Discovery United	0–0	2–0	3–3	—	3–3	1–2	3–0	—	0–3	—	2–0	—
Pluakdaeng United	2–0	—	3–0	1–3	0–0	3–1	—	7–2	—	3–0	—	4–2
Royal Thai Fleet	1–2	2–2	—	0–2	0–3	—	1–2	1–1	0–3	—	2–2	0–0
Saimit Kabin United	1–0	—	1–1	2–2	0–3	1–0	1–0	1–0	0–0	—	—	1–0
Sakaeo	1–0	2–1	—	1–5	—	—	2–2	1–1	1–3	3–0	1–1	—

Source: Thai League
Legend: Blue = home team win; Yellow = draw; Red = away team win.
For upcoming matches, an "a" indicates there is an article about the rivalry between the two participants.

== Season statistics ==
=== Top scorers ===
As of 3 January 2021.

Rank	Player	Club	Goals
1	(Republic of the Congo) Burnel Okana-Stazi	Bankhai United	17
2	(Thailand) Sarawut Choenchai	Chachoengsao Hi-Tek	12
3	(Brazil) Lucas Massaro Garcia Gama	Chachoengsao Hi-Tek	11
3	(Brazil) Alberto Moreira Gouvea	Pluakdaeng United	11
5	(Thailand) Anurak Yeunhan	Pluakdaeng United	10
6	(Thailand) Warut Trongkratok	Pluakdaeng United	7
7	(Thailand) Nititorn Sripramarn	Banbueng	6
7	(Thailand) Soravit Saisom	Marines Eureka	6
7	(Thailand) Pipat Thonkanya	Pattaya Discovery United	6

=== Hat-tricks ===
Player	For	Against	Result	Date
(Republic of the Congo) Burnel Okana-Stazi	Bankhai United	Banbueng	4–2 (A)	10 October 2020
(Republic of the Congo) Burnel Okana-Stazi	Bankhai United	Pattaya Discovery United	3–0 (H)	18 November 2020

Notes: (H) = Home team; (A) = Away team

=== Clean sheets ===
As of 3 January 2021.

Rank	Player	Club	Clean sheets
1	(Thailand) Pitsanu Permsab	Chachoengsao Hi-Tek	10
2	(Thailand) Kittisak Foofung	Pluakdaeng United	8
2	(Thailand) Sarayut Poolsap	Saimit Kabin United	8
4	(Thailand) Chairat Ketsaratikun	Chanthaburi	4
4	(Thailand) Anurak Suwalak	Marines Eureka	4
6	(Thailand) Ratchanon Intharavisut	Assawin Kohkwang United	3
6	(Thailand) Worawut Sukhuna	Bankhai United	3
6	(Thailand) Mongkol Jitthai	Pattaya Discovery United	3
6	(Thailand) Pongsaton Kachapol	Royal Thai Fleet	3

== See also ==
- 2020–21 Thai League 1
- 2020–21 Thai League 2
- 2020–21 Thai League 3
- 2020–21 Thai League 3 Northern Region
- 2020–21 Thai League 3 Northeastern Region
- 2020–21 Thai League 3 Western Region
- 2020–21 Thai League 3 Southern Region
- 2020–21 Thai League 3 Bangkok Metropolitan Region
- 2020–21 Thai League 3 National Championship
- 2020–21 Thai FA Cup
- 2020 Thailand Champions Cup
