= 2020–21 Thai League 3 Southern Region =

Thai League 3 Southern Region
- Season: 2020–21
- Dates: 3 October 2020 – 3 January 2021
- Champions: Songkhla
- T3 National Championship: Songkhla; Krabi
- Matches: 99
- Goals: 278 (2.81 per match)
- Top goalscorer: (Germany) George Kelbel (15 goals; Krabi)
- Biggest home win: 12 goals difference Krabi 13–1 Surat Thani (22 November 2020)
- Biggest away win: 4 goals difference Phatthalung 1–5 Songkhla (1 November 2020); Jalor City 0–4 Songkhla (14 November 2020); Surat Thani 2–6 Jalor City (18 November 2020)
- Highest scoring: 14 goals Krabi 13–1 Surat Thani (22 November 2020)
- Longest winning run: 6 matches Nara United; Songkhla
- Longest unbeaten run: 9 matches Trang
- Longest winless run: 9 matches Patong City
- Longest losing run: 7 matches Surat Thani

The 2020–21 Thai League 3 Southern region is a region in the regional stage of the 2020–21 Thai League 3. Due to the COVID-19 pandemic, the season must be postponed to start in late 2020 and end in early 2021. In addition, the Thai League 4 had combined with the Thai League 3 and compete as Thai League 3 since this season and there is no relegation in this season. A total of 12 teams located in Southern of Thailand will compete in the league of the Southern region.

In late December 2020, COVID-19 had spread again in Thailand, the FA Thailand must abruptly end the regional stage of the Thai League 3.

== Teams ==
=== Number of teams by province ===
Position	Province	Number	Teams
1	Surat Thani	2	Surat Thani and Surat Thani City
2	Krabi	1	Krabi
2	Nakhon Si Thammarat	1	Nakhon Si United
2	Narathiwat	1	Nara United
2	Pattani	1	Pattani
2	Phatthalung	1	Phatthalung
2	Phuket	1	Patong City
2	Satun	1	Satun United
2	Songkhla	1	Songkhla
2	Trang	1	Trang
2	Yala	1	Jalor City

=== Stadiums and locations ===
Locations of the 2020–21 Thai League 3 Southern region teams

Team	Location	Stadium	Coordinates
Jalor City	Yala (Mueang)	Jaru Stadium	6°34′42″N 101°17′52″E
Krabi	Krabi (Mueang)	Krabi Provincial Stadium	8°06′30″N 98°55′00″E
Nakhon Si United	Nakhon Si Thammarat (Ron Phibun)	Nakhon Si Thammarat PAO. Stadium	8°11′56″N 99°52′09″E
Nara United	Narathiwat (Mueang)	Narathiwat PAO. Stadium	6°25′39″N 101°48′15″E
Patong City	Phuket (Mueang)	Surakul Stadium	7°53′20″N 98°22′19″E
Pattani	Pattani (Mueang)	Pattani Provincial Stadium	6°53′20″N 101°14′41″E
Phatthalung	Phatthalung (Mueang)	Phatthalung Provincial Stadium	7°37′00″N 100°02′55″E
Satun United	Satun (Mueang)	Satun PAO. Stadium	6°39′05″N 100°04′45″E
Songkhla	Songkhla (Mueang)	Tinsulanon Stadium	7°12′26″N 100°35′55″E
Surat Thani	Surat Thani (Mueang)	Surat Thani Provincial Stadium	9°08′06″N 99°20′50″E
Surat Thani City	Surat Thani (Wiang Sa)	Ban Song Municipality Stadium	8°39′43″N 99°22′32″E
Trang	Trang (Mueang)	Trang Municipality Stadium	7°33′12″N 99°36′57″E

=== Foreign players ===
A T3 team could register 3 foreign players from foreign players all around the world. A team can use 3 foreign players on the field in each game.

Note :
(substituted off) : players who released during second leg transfer window;
(substituted on) : players who registered during second leg transfer window.

AFC member countries players.
CAF member countries players.
CONCACAF member countries players.
CONMEBOL member countries players.
OFC member countries players.
UEFA member countries players.
No foreign player registered.

Club	Leg	Player 1	Player 2	Player 3
Jalor City	1st
Jalor City	2nd
Krabi	1st	(Brazil) Vitor Marcelo Alves Alcântara	(Germany) George Kelbel	(Ivory Coast) Koné Seydou
Krabi	2nd	(Brazil) Vitor Marcelo Alves Alcântara	(Germany) George Kelbel	(Ivory Coast) Koné Seydou
Nakhon Si United	1st	(Brazil) Lucas (substituted off)	(Ghana) Samulabega Ampofo (substituted off)	(Brazil) Gustavo
Nakhon Si United	2nd	(Brazil) Phillerson Natan Silva de Oliveira (substituted on)	(Brazil) Rosalvo Cândido Rosa Júnior (substituted on)	(Brazil) Gustavo
Nara United	1st
Nara United	2nd	(Iran) Mohammad Reza Rokni (substituted on)	(Japan) Ryohei Maeda (substituted on)
Patong City	1st	(France) Takouloufa Azzeddine	(Italy) Jacopo Avanzo	(Myanmar) Saw Naing Moe Aung
Patong City	2nd	(France) Takouloufa Azzeddine	(Italy) Jacopo Avanzo	(Myanmar) Saw Naing Moe Aung
Pattani	1st	(Laos) Mitsada Saitaifah (substituted off)	(Togo) Vincent Bossou
Pattani	2nd	(Georgia (country)) Giorgi Tsimakuridze (substituted on)	(Togo) Vincent Bossou
Phatthalung	1st	(Kenya) Basil Onyango Jacob
Phatthalung	2nd	(Kenya) Basil Onyango Jacob
Satun United	1st	(Georgia (country)) Nika Kobauri (substituted off)
Satun United	2nd	(Ghana) Samulabega Ampofo (substituted on)
Songkhla	1st		(South Korea) Han Yun-soo (substituted off)	(Brazil) Marlon Henrique Brandão da Silva
Songkhla	2nd	(Brazil) Cristian Alex (substituted on)	(Brazil) Felipe Nunes (substituted on)	(Brazil) Marlon Henrique Brandão da Silva
Surat Thani	1st	(Turkey) Ali Alakabak (substituted off)	(Iran) Afrough Ali Shirmohammad (substituted off)	(Iran) Mohammadrafie Milad Sasani Nezhad (substituted off)
Surat Thani	2nd			(United States) Christian Joseph Sacchini (substituted on)
Surat Thani City	1st	(Georgia (country)) Giorgi Tsimakuridze (substituted off)	(Nigeria) Emmanuel Nwachi	(Mali) Toloba Aremu Kassim Mouyidine
Surat Thani City	2nd	(Brazil) Lucas (substituted on)	(Nigeria) Emmanuel Nwachi	(Mali) Toloba Aremu Kassim Mouyidine
Trang	1st	(Brazil) Phillerson Natan Silva de Oliveira (substituted off)	(Brazil) Thiago (substituted off)	(Brazil) Victor Amaro
Trang	2nd		(South Korea) Han Yun-soo (substituted on)	(Brazil) Victor Amaro

== League table ==
=== Standings ===
Pos	Team	Pld	W	D	L	GF	GA	GD	Pts	Qualification or relegation
1	Songkhla (Q)	16	12	1	3	29	16	+13	37	Qualification to the National Championship stage
2	Krabi (Q)	17	10	5	2	43	17	+26	35	Qualification to the National Championship stage
3	Nara United	17	9	4	4	30	15	+15	31	
4	Nakhon Si United	16	9	2	5	30	17	+13	29	
5	Pattani	16	7	7	2	19	7	+12	28	
6	Trang	16	7	5	4	19	13	+6	26	
7	Jalor City	17	6	4	7	20	24	−4	22	
8	Surat Thani City	17	5	5	7	17	23	−6	20	
9	Satun United	17	5	4	8	29	23	+6	19	
10	Patong City	17	3	2	12	16	36	−20	11	
11	Surat Thani	16	3	1	12	11	53	−42	10	
12	Phatthalung	16	3	0	13	15	34	−19	9	

Source: Thai League
Rules for classification: 1) Points; 2) Head-to-head points; 3) Head-to-head goal difference; 4) Head-to-head goal scored; 5) Overall goal difference; 6) Overall goal scored; 7) Fair play points; 8) Play-off without extra time).
(Q) Qualified for the phase indicated

=== Positions by round ===
Team ╲ Round	1	2	3	4	5	6	7	8	9	10	11	12	13	14	15	16	17
Songkhla	2	2	2	5	4	3	2	2	1	1	1	1	1	1	1	1	1
Krabi	6	3	6	7	1	1	3	3	3	2	2	2	2	3	3	2	2
Nara United	4	6	1	4	6	7	7	6	7	6	6	4	3	2	2	3	3
Nakhon Si United	8	10	9	6	7	6	4	5	4	4	3	3	4	4	5	5	4
Pattani	7	4	4	1	2	4	5	4	5	5	5	6	6	6	4	4	5
Trang	5	1	3	2	3	2	1	1	2	3	4	5	5	5	6	6	6
Jalor City	1	7	7	8	10	10	9	9	9	8	8	8	7	7	7	7	7
Surat Thani City	3	5	5	3	5	5	6	8	8	9	9	9	9	9	9	8	8
Satun United	10	9	10	11	9	9	8	7	6	7	7	7	8	8	8	9	9
Patong City	12	8	8	10	11	11	11	11	12	12	12	10	10	11	10	10	10
Surat Thani	11	12	12	9	8	8	10	10	11	11	11	12	12	10	12	11	11
Phatthalung	9	11	11	12	12	12	12	12	10	10	10	11	11	12	11	12	12

Source: Thai League
= Qualification to the National Championship stage

=== Results by round ===
Team ╲ Round	1	2	3	4	5	6	7	8	9	10	11	12	13	14	15	16	17
Songkhla	W	D	W	L	W	W	W	W	W	W	L	W	W	L	W	W	N
Krabi	D	W	D	W	W	W	L	W	D	W	W	D	D	L	W	W	W
Nara United	W	D	W	D	L	D	L	W	L	W	W	W	W	W	W	D	L
Nakhon Si United	L	L	W	W	L	W	W	L	W	W	W	D	L	W	D	W	N
Pattani	D	W	W	W	D	D	L	W	L	D	W	D	W	W	D	D	N
Trang	W	W	D	W	D	W	W	W	D	L	L	D	W	L	L	D	N
Jalor City	W	L	L	L	D	L	W	L	W	W	L	D	W	D	L	W	D
Surat Thani City	W	D	W	W	L	D	L	L	L	L	D	L	W	D	L	W	D
Satun United	L	D	L	L	W	D	W	W	D	D	W	L	L	L	L	L	W
Patong City	L	W	L	L	L	L	L	L	D	L	D	W	L	L	W	L	L
Surat Thani	L	L	L	W	W	L	L	L	L	L	L	L	W	L	D	L	N
Phatthalung	L	L	L	L	L	L	W	L	W	L	L	L	L	W	L	L	N

Source: Thai League
N = No match; W = Won; D = Drawn; L = Lost

=== Results ===
Home \ Away	JLC	KBI	NSU	NRU	PTC	PTN	PLG	STU	SON	SRT	STC	TRG
Jalor City	—	1–1	1–0	0–0	3–0	0–0	2–1	—	0–4	—	0–1	2–1
Krabi	2–0	—	—	4–1	3–0	—	0–1	—	3–0	13–1	3–1	2–2
Nakhon Si United	1–0	0–1	—	3–2	3–0	0–2	4–3	2–0	—	8–0	—	—
Nara United	3–0	4–1	—	—	3–0	0–0	—	6–2	0–2	4–1	0–0	1–0
Patong City	—	1–3	2–3	—	—	0–2	3–1	—	1–2	4–1	0–0	1–1
Pattani	1–2	0–0	1–1	0–0	4–0	—	—	0–0	—	—	—	0–0
Phatthalung	—	1–2	—	0–1	1–2	0–1	—	3–1	1–5	0–1	1–0	0–1
Satun United	3–0	2–2	0–1	1–2	2–0	—	7–0	—	1–1	4–0	0–1	—
Songkhla	—	—	1–0	1–0	2–1	2–1	3–2	2–1	—	2–0	—	0–3
Surat Thani	2–6	—	1–1	—	2–1	0–2	1–0	0–3	—	—	0–1	0–2
Surat Thani City	3–3	1–2	2–1	0–3	—	1–2	—	2–2	1–2	2–1	—	1–1
Trang	1–0	1–1	1–2	—	—	1–3	—	1–0	1–0	—	2–0	—

Source: Thai League
Legend: Blue = home team win; Yellow = draw; Red = away team win.
For upcoming matches, an "a" indicates there is an article about the rivalry between the two participants.

== Season statistics ==
=== Top scorers ===
As of 3 January 2021.

Rank	Player	Club	Goals
1	(Germany) George Kelbel	Krabi	15
2	(Thailand) Ayu Lateh	Jalor City	10
2	(Thailand) Yodwong Misen	Patong City	10
4	(Thailand) Pornthep Heemla	Satun United	8
4	(Thailand) Abdussalam Saman	Songkhla	8
6	(Thailand) Issarapong Lilakorn	Nakhon Si United	7
6	(Thailand) Phuchakhen Chandaeng	Trang	7
8	(Thailand) Chakris Ti-aiadyo	Pattani	6
8	(Thailand) Ibrohem Ardum	Satun United	6

=== Hat-tricks ===
Player	For	Against	Result	Date
(Thailand) Ilham Ibrohing	Nara United	Satun United	6–2 (H)	18 October 2020
(Germany) George Kelbel	Krabi	Nara United	4–1 (H)	28 October 2020
(Brazil) Vitor Marcelo Alves Alcântara	Krabi	Surat Thani	13–1 (H)	22 November 2020
(Germany) George Kelbel^{4}	Krabi	Surat Thani	13–1 (H)	22 November 2020
(Thailand) Ayu Lateh	Jalor City	Surat Thani City	3–3 (A)	19 December 2020
(Thailand) Yodwong Misen	Patong City	Surat Thani	4–1 (H)	23 December 2020

Notes: ^{4} = Player scored 4 goals; (H) = Home team; (A) = Away team

=== Clean sheets ===
As of 3 January 2021.

Rank	Player	Club	Clean sheets
1	(Thailand) Ninuruddin Nideha	Pattani	11
2	(Thailand) Jarudet Ramudth	Nara United	9
3	(Thailand) Nattapong Thongpum	Trang (7), Nakhon Si United (1)	8
4	(Thailand) Wuttichai Panbut	Krabi	4
4	(Thailand) Safaree Nunsen	Satun United	4
4	(Thailand) Nipon Ninchan	Songkhla	4
7	(Thailand) Firhan Masae	Jalor City	3
7	(Thailand) Peradach Bunkame	Nakhon Si United	3

== See also ==
- 2020–21 Thai League 1
- 2020–21 Thai League 2
- 2020–21 Thai League 3
- 2020–21 Thai League 3 Northern Region
- 2020–21 Thai League 3 Northeastern Region
- 2020–21 Thai League 3 Eastern Region
- 2020–21 Thai League 3 Western Region
- 2020–21 Thai League 3 Bangkok Metropolitan Region
- 2020–21 Thai League 3 National Championship
- 2020–21 Thai FA Cup
- 2020 Thailand Champions Cup
