= 2018 Thai League 3 Play-off Round =

2018 Thai League 3
- Season: 2018

The Thai League 3 Play-off Round is the last promotion quota of Thai League 2 and determines which club will be the champion of 2018 Thai League 3. The Thai Football clubs that are the champion and runner-up of the 2018 Thai League 3 Upper Region and the champion and the runner-up of the 2018 Thai League 3 Lower Region, compete in the 2018 Thai League 3 Play-off Round. In this round, home and away matches are played against each team, and the clubs that get the highest total scores are promoted to Thai League 2. The away goals rule is used in this tournament.

== 3rd Position of Play-off round ==
Team 1	Agg.	Team 2	1st leg	2nd leg
Ayutthaya United	2 – 1	Nara United	1 – 1	1 – 0

8 September 2018	Nara United	1 – 1	Ayutthaya United	Narathiwat
16:30 (UTC+7)	Ahamarasul Due-reh 90+6'	Report	Arnon Buspha 20'	Stadium: Narathiwat PAO. Stadium; Attendance: 2,500; Referee: Pathompong Eawjaroen

16 September 2018	Ayutthaya United	1 – 0	Nara United	Ayutthaya
18:30 (UTC+7)	Arnon Buspha 46'	Report		Stadium: Ayutthaya Province Stadium; Attendance: 4,896; Referee: Ketdumrong Khemthong

== 1st Position of Play-off round ==
Team 1	Agg.	Team 2	1st leg	2nd leg
JL Chiangmai United	2 – 0	MOF Customs United	1 – 0	1 – 0

9 September 2018	MOF Customs United	0 – 1	JL Chiangmai United	Samut Prakan
16:00 (UTC+7)		Report	Anggello Machuca 57'	Stadium: Lad Krabang 54 Stadium; Attendance: 700; Referee: Niwat Insa-ard

15 September 2018	JL Chiangmai United	1 – 0	MOF Customs United	Chiangmai
18:00 (UTC+7)	Anggello Machuca 14'	Report		Stadium: 700th Anniversary Stadium; Attendance: 536; Referee: Patiyut Montianarts

== Winner ==
2018 Thai League 3
JL Chiangmai United
1st title
