= João Paulo (footballer, born March 1988) =

Brazilian association football player

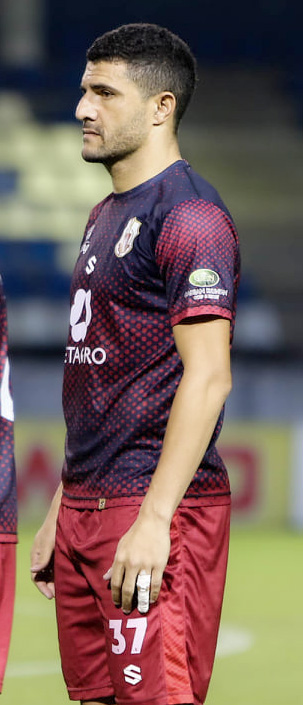

Personal information
- Full name: João Paulo Sales de Souza
- Date of birth: 18 March 1988 (age 38)
- Place of birth: Fernandópolis, Brazil
- Height: 1.85 m (6 ft 1 in)
- Position: Forward

Team information
- Current team: Ayutthaya United
- Number: 37

Senior career*
Years	Team	Apps	(Gls)
2008	Fernandópolis		
2009–2010	América–SP	2	(0)
2010–2011	Marília	17	(4)
2011	Fernandópolis		
2012	Cianorte	16	(2)
2013	Operário Ferroviário	14	(2)
2013	Central		
2013	Marcílio Dias	1	(0)
2013	Fernandópolis		
2014	Mixto		
2014	Olímpia		
2015	Democrata GV	11	(6)
2015	Boa Esporte	5	(1)
2015	Tombense	6	(1)
2016	Ríver–PI	4	(0)
2016	Rio Claro	7	(0)
2016	São Bento	2	(0)
2016	Blooming	19	(9)
2017	Bangkok	30	(23)
2018–2019	PTT Rayong	4	(3)
2019	Viettel	13	(7)
2019	Army United	15	(10)
2020	Udon Thani	16	(8)
2020–2022	Lamphun Warrior	22	(14)
2022	→ Phitsanulok (loan)	18	(7)
2022	Trat	15	(4)
2023	Suphanburi	9	(3)
2023	Udon United	10	(13)
2024–	Ayutthaya United	11	(1)
- * Club domestic league appearances and goals as of 10 March 2024

João Paulo Sales de Souza (born 18 March 1988), known as João Paulo, is a Brazilian footballer who plays as forward for Thai League 2 club Ayutthaya United.

== Career statistics ==
As of 16 January 2017

Club	Season	League			State League		Cup		Conmebol		Other		Total	
Club	Season	Division	Apps	Goals	Apps	Goals	Apps	Goals	Apps	Goals	Apps	Goals	Apps	Goals
Fernandópolis	2008	Paulista B	—		21	12	—		—		—		21	12
América–SP	2009	Paulista A2	—		—		—		—		4 (Note: All appearance(s) in Copa Paulista)	0	4	0
América–SP	2010	Paulista A2	—		2	0	—		—		—		2	0
América–SP	Subtotal		—		2	0	—		—		4	0	6	0
Marília	2010	Série C	2	0	0	0	—		—		2	2	4	2
Marília	2011	Série C	—		15	4	—		—		—		15	4
Marília	Subtotal		2	0	15	4	—		—		2	2	19	6
Fernandópolis	2011	Paulista B	—		17	12	—		—		—		17	12
Cianorte	2012	Série D	5	1	11	1	—		—		—		16	2
Operário Ferroviário	2013	Paranaense	—		14	2	—		—		—		14	2
Marcílio Dias	2013	Série D	1	0	—		—		—		—		1	0
Fernandópolis	2013	Paulista B	—		9	3	—		—		—		9	3
Mixto	2014	Matogrossense	—		10	3	2	0	—		2 (Note: All appearance(s) in Copa Verde)	2	14	5
Olímpia	2014	Paulista B	—		13	7	—		—		—		13	7
Democrata GV	2015	Mineiro	—		11	6	—		—		—		11	6
Boa Esporte	2015	Série B	5	1	—		—		—		—		5	1
Tombense	2015	Série C	6	1	—		—		—		—		6	1
Ríver–PI	2016	Série C	—		2	0	—		—		2 (Note: All appearance(s) in Copa do Nordeste)	0	4	0
Rio Claro	2016	Paulista	—		7	0	—		—		—		7	0
São Bento	2016	Série D	2	0	—		—		—		—		2	0
Blooming	2016–17	Boliviano	19	9	—		—		4	2	—		23	11
Career total			40	12	132	50	2	0	4	2	10	4	188	68

== Honours ==
=== Club ===
Lamphun Warrior

- Thai League 3: 2020–21
