= Weerayut Jitkuntod =

Thai footballer (born 1984)

Personal information
- Full name: Weerayut Jitkuntod
- Date of birth: 2 January 1984 (age 42)
- Place of birth: Nakhon Sawan, Thailand
- Height: 1.65 m (5 ft 5 in)
- Position: Right back

Team information
- Current team: Nakhon Sawan See Khwae City
- Number: 14

Senior career*
Years	Team	Apps	(Gls)
2005–2008	Tobacco Monopoly	68	(7)
2009–2010	Buriram PEA	7	(1)
2011–2015	Songkhla United	12	(1)
2015	Air Force Central		
2016	TOT		
2016	Krabi		
2017–2023	North Bangkok University	103	(6)
2023	Chanthaburi	3	(0)
2024–	Nakhon Sawan See Khwae City	9	(0)

International career
2007	Thailand U23		
2004	Thailand	4	(1)
Medal record
Men's football
Representing Thailand
Southeast Asian Games
Gold medal – first place	2007 Kuala Lumpur
- * Club domestic league appearances and goals as of 7 May 2023

Weerayut Jitkuntod (Thai: วีรยุทธ จิตขุนทด; born January 2, 1984) is a Thai professional footballer who plays as a right back.

== International career ==
=== International ===
As of 27 March 2016

National team	Year	Apps	Goals
Thailand	2004	4	0
Thailand	Total	4	0

== International goals ==
#	Date	Venue	Opponent	Score	Result	Competition
1.	December 12, 2004	Kuala Lumpur, Malaysia	Timor-Leste	3–0	8–0	2004 Tiger Cup

== Honours ==
=== Club ===
TTM Phichit

- Thai Premier League (1) : 2004–05
- Kor Royal Cup (1): 2006

Buriram

- Thailand Division 1 League (1): 2011

North Bangkok University

- Thai League 3 Bangkok Metropolitan Region (3): 2020–21, 2021–22, 2022–23
- Thai League 4 Bangkok Metropolitan Region (2): 2017, 2018

=== International ===
Thailand U-23

- Sea Games Gold Medal (1); 2007
