= Tana Sripandorn =

Thai footballer (born 1986)

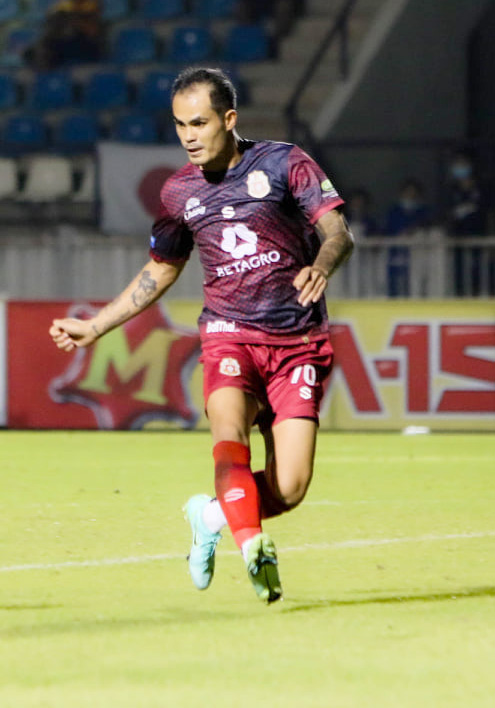

Personal information
- Full name: Tana Sripandorn
- Date of birth: 15 August 1986 (age 40)
- Place of birth: Udon Thani, Thailand
- Height: 1.75 m (5 ft 9 in)
- Position: Defender

Team information
- Current team: Rongseemaechaithanachotiwat Phayao
- Number: 70

Senior career*
Years	Team	Apps	(Gls)
2009–2010	TTM Phichit	17	(0)
2011–2012	Samut Songkhram	24	(0)
2013–2014	Bangkok	29	(2)
2015	Osotspa Samut Prakan	2	(0)
2016–2019	Air Force Central	30	(1)
2019	Samut Sakhon	5	(0)
2019	Chamchuri United	12	(0)
2020–2022	Lamphun Warrior	34	(1)
2022–2023	Phitsanulok	17	(3)
2023–	Rongseemaechaithanachotiwat Phayao	7	(0)
- * Club domestic league appearances and goals as of 6 May 2023

Tana Sripandorn (Thai: ธนา ศรีพันดร; born August 15, 1986) is a Thai professional footballer who plays as a defender for Rongseemaechaithanachotiwat Phayao.

== Honour ==
Lamphun Warriors

- Thai League 2 (1): 2021–22
- Thai League 3 (1): 2020–21

Phitsanulok

- Thai League 3 Northern Region: 2022–23
