= 2020–21 Thai League 3 Northeastern Region =

Thai League 3 Northeastern Region
- Season: 2020–21
- Dates: 3 October 2020 – 3 January 2021
- Champions: Udon United
- T3 National Championship: Udon United; Muang Loei United
- Matches: 85
- Goals: 283 (3.33 per match)
- Top goalscorer: (Brazil) Jardel Capistrano (22 goals; Udon United)
- Biggest home win: 8 goals difference Udon United 8–0 Surin City (3 October 2020)
- Biggest away win: 7 goals difference Mahasarakham 2–9 Udon United (27 December 2020)
- Highest scoring: 11 goals Mahasarakham 2–9 Udon United (27 December 2020)
- Longest winning run: 9 matches Udon United
- Longest unbeaten run: 16 matches Udon United
- Longest winless run: 12 matches Chaiyaphum United
- Longest losing run: 6 matches Khon Kaen Mordindang

The 2020–21 Thai League 3 Northeastern region is a region in the regional stage of the 2020–21 Thai League 3. Due to the COVID-19 pandemic, the season must be postponed to start in late 2020 and end in early 2021. In addition, the Thai League 4 had combined with the Thai League 3 and compete as Thai League 3 since this season and there is no relegation in this season. A total of 11 teams located in Northeastern of Thailand will compete in the league of the Northeastern region.

In late December 2020, COVID-19 had spread again in Thailand, the FA Thailand must abruptly end the regional stage of the Thai League 3.

== Teams ==
=== Number of teams by province ===
Position	Province	Number	Teams
1	Surin	2	Surin City and Surin Khong Chee Mool
2	Chaiyaphum	1	Chaiyaphum United
2	Khon Kaen	1	Khon Kaen Mordindang
2	Loei	1	Muang Loei United
2	Maha Sarakham	1	Mahasarakham
2	Nakhon Ratchasima	1	Nakhon Ratchasima United
2	Sakon Nakhon	1	Sakon Nakhon
2	Ubon Ratchathani	1	Ubon Kruanapat
2	Udon Thani	1	Udon United
2	Yasothon	1	Yasothon

=== Stadiums and locations ===
Locations of the 2020–21 Thai League 3 Northeastern region teams

Team	Location	Stadium	Coordinates
Chaiyaphum United	Chaiyaphum (Mueang)	Chaiyaphum Provincial Stadium	15°48′28″N 102°01′16″E
Khon Kaen Mordindang	Khon Kaen (Mueang)	Khon Kaen University Stadium	16°28′36″N 102°49′04″E
Mahasarakham	Mahasarakham (Mueang)	Mahasarakham Provincial Stadium	16°09′15″N 103°18′59″E
Muang Loei United	Loei (Mueang)	Loei Provincial Stadium	17°29′09″N 101°44′06″E
Nakhon Ratchasima United	Nakhon Ratchasima (Mueang)	Nakhon Ratchasima Rajabhat University Stadium	14°59′07″N 102°06′53″E
Sakon Nakhon	Sakon Nakhon (Mueang)	Sakon Nakhon Provincial Stadium	17°12′04″N 104°06′22″E
Surin City	Surin (Mueang)	Sri Narong Stadium	14°52′30″N 103°29′50″E
Surin Khong Chee Mool	Surin (Mueang)	Stadium of Rajamangala University of Technology Isan, Surin Campus	14°51′15″N 103°28′53″E
Ubon Kruanapat	Ubon Ratchathani (Khueang Nai)	Stadium of Ubon Ratchathani Rajabhat University, Ban Yang Noi Campus	15°20′58″N 104°37′46″E
Udon United	Udon Thani (Mueang)	Stadium of Thailand National Sports University, Udon Thani Campus	17°24′20″N 102°46′09″E
Yasothon	Yasothon (Mueang)	Yasothon PAO. Stadium	15°46′58″N 104°09′06″E

=== Foreign players ===
A T3 team could register 3 foreign players from foreign players all around the world. A team can use 3 foreign players on the field in each game.

Note :
(substituted off) : players who released during second leg transfer window;
(substituted in) : players who registered during second leg transfer window.

AFC member countries players.
CAF member countries players.
CONCACAF member countries players.
CONMEBOL member countries players.
OFC member countries players.
UEFA member countries players.
No foreign player registered.

Club	Leg	Player 1	Player 2	Player 3
Chaiyaphum United	1st	(Ghana) Armah Abraham Ayaa	(Ghana) Joseph Quasi Amponsah	(Guinea) Soumah Djibril Guineenne
Chaiyaphum United	2nd	(Ghana) Armah Abraham Ayaa	(Ghana) Joseph Quasi Amponsah	(Guinea) Soumah Djibril Guineenne
Khon Kaen Mordindang	1st	(Cameroon) Tagne Djokam Boris Wilfried
Khon Kaen Mordindang	2nd	(Cameroon) Tagne Djokam Boris Wilfried
Mahasarakham	1st
Mahasarakham	2nd
Muang Loei United	1st	(Sierra Leone) Alpha Sama (substituted off)	(Brazil) Célio Guilherme da Silva Santos	(Ivory Coast) Diarra Junior Aboubacar
Muang Loei United	2nd	(Nigeria) Julius Chukwuma Ononiwu (substituted in)	(Brazil) Célio Guilherme da Silva Santos	(Ivory Coast) Diarra Junior Aboubacar
Nakhon Ratchasima United	1st	(Ivory Coast) Cheick Barou Diaby (substituted off)	(Brazil) Vinicius Silva Freitas	(Iran) Amirmohammad Karamdar
Nakhon Ratchasima United	2nd		(Brazil) Vinicius Silva Freitas	(Iran) Amirmohammad Karamdar
Sakon Nakhon	1st	(Japan) Oigawa Nozomi (substituted off)	(Senegal) Sall Tafsir	(Japan) Omae So
Sakon Nakhon	2nd	(Nigeria) Michael Wellington (substituted in)	(Senegal) Sall Tafsir	(Japan) Omae So
Surin City	1st
Surin City	2nd
Surin Khong Chee Mool	1st
Surin Khong Chee Mool	2nd	(Argentina) Leonardo Martin Ferrari (substituted in)
Ubon Kruanapat	1st	(Brazil) Fabricio Peris Carneiro (substituted off)	(France) Zady Moise Gnenegbe (substituted off)	(Cameroon) David Bayiha
Ubon Kruanapat	2nd	(Cameroon) Akono Monayong Joseph Berand (substituted in)	(Iran) Mohammadrafie Milad Sasani Nezhad (substituted in)	(Cameroon) David Bayiha
Udon United	1st	(South Korea) Park Jae-hyeong (substituted off)	(Brazil) Andrey Coutinho	(Brazil) Jardel Capistrano
Udon United	2nd	(Brazil) Josimar Tiago da Silva (substituted in)	(Brazil) Andrey Coutinho	(Brazil) Jardel Capistrano
Yasothon	1st	(Nigeria) Michael Wellington (substituted off)
Yasothon	2nd

== League table ==
=== Standings ===
Pos	Team	Pld	W	D	L	GF	GA	GD	Pts	Qualification or relegation
1	Udon United (Q)	16	15	1	0	63	17	+46	46	Qualification to the National Championship stage
2	Muang Loei United (Q)	15	12	1	2	35	9	+26	37	Qualification to the National Championship stage
3	Yasothon	15	8	3	4	21	13	+8	27	
4	Ubon Kruanapat	15	8	3	4	25	21	+4	27	
5	Surin City	16	5	3	8	23	30	−7	18	
6	Nakhon Ratchasima United	16	4	4	8	25	38	−13	16	
7	Surin Khong Chee Mool	16	3	6	7	25	33	−8	15	
8	Chaiyaphum United	15	2	8	5	16	24	−8	14	
9	Khon Kaen Mordindang	15	3	3	9	18	28	−10	12	
10	Sakon Nakhon	16	2	6	8	15	25	−10	12	
11	Mahasarakham	15	3	2	10	17	45	−28	11	

Source: Thai League
Rules for classification: 1) Points; 2) Head-to-head points; 3) Head-to-head goal difference; 4) Head-to-head goal scored; 5) Overall goal difference; 6) Overall goal scored; 7) Fair play points; 8) Play-off without extra time).
(Q) Qualified for the phase indicated

=== Positions by round ===
Team ╲ Round	1	2	3	4	5	6	7	8	9	10	11	12	13	14	15	16	17
Udon United	1	1	1	1	1	1	1	1	1	1	1	1	1	1	1	1	1
Muang Loei United	3	2	2	3	2	2	2	2	2	2	2	2	2	2	2	2	2
Yasothon	2	4	3	4	4	6	6	5	4	4	4	4	4	4	4	4	3
Ubon Kruanapat	5	3	5	5	5	4	4	3	3	3	3	3	3	3	3	3	4
Surin City	11	5	4	2	3	3	3	4	5	5	5	5	5	5	5	5	5
Nakhon Ratchasima United	8	10	10	11	8	7	7	7	7	7	7	7	6	6	6	6	6
Surin Khong Chee Mool	4	8	6	6	6	5	5	6	6	6	6	6	7	7	7	7	7
Chaiyaphum United	6	6	7	8	9	8	8	9	9	9	10	10	10	10	9	8	8
Khon Kaen Mordindang	7	7	8	9	11	11	11	11	11	11	11	11	11	11	10	10	9
Sakon Nakhon	9	9	9	10	10	10	9	8	8	8	9	8	8	8	8	9	10
Mahasarakham	10	11	11	7	7	9	10	10	10	10	8	9	9	9	11	11	11

Source: Thai League
= Qualification to the National Championship stage

=== Results by round ===
Team ╲ Round	1	2	3	4	5	6	7	8	9	10	11	12	13	14	15	16	17
Udon United	W	W	W	W	W	W	W	W	W	D	N	W	W	W	W	W	W
Muang Loei United	W	W	D	L	W	W	N	W	W	W	W	W	W	L	W	W	N
Yasothon	W	L	W	D	D	N	L	W	W	D	W	L	W	L	W	N	W
Ubon Kruanapat	D	W	L	D	N	W	W	W	D	L	W	W	L	W	N	W	L
Surin City	L	W	W	W	L	L	W	N	L	D	D	W	D	L	L	L	L
Nakhon Ratchasima United	N	L	L	W	D	W	L	L	D	W	D	L	W	D	L	L	L
Surin Khong Chee Mool	D	L	D	W	L	W	D	L	N	W	L	L	L	D	L	D	D
Chaiyaphum United	D	D	L	N	D	D	D	L	L	D	L	D	L	N	W	W	D
Khon Kaen Mordindang	D	N	L	L	L	L	L	L	D	L	L	N	D	W	W	L	W
Sakon Nakhon	L	D	L	D	L	L	W	D	D	N	L	D	L	W	L	D	L
Mahasarakham	L	L	N	W	D	L	L	D	L	L	W	L	N	L	L	L	W

Source: Thai League
N = No match; W = Won; D = Drawn; L = Lost

=== Results ===
Home \ Away	CPU	KKM	MSK	MLU	NRU	SNK	SRC	KCM	UBK	UDU	YST
Chaiyaphum United	—	0–0	1–0	—	1–1	0–0	1–1	1–1	1–2	—	0–1
Khon Kaen Mordindang	—	—	2–1	0–2	4–1	1–1	1–2	—	5–0	0–4	1–3
Mahasarakham	2–2	2–1	—	0–3	—	—	2–4	4–2	1–3	2–9	—
Muang Loei United	4–0	4–0	—	—	7–1	—	2–1	2–0	1–0	0–2	3–0
Nakhon Ratchasima United	1–3	4–1	2–0	—	—	1–0	—	3–3	—	2–5	2–0
Sakon Nakhon	2–2	—	0–0	0–1	2–1	—	1–0	0–3	—	2–3	1–3
Surin City	—	1–1	2–3	0–1	1–1	3–1	—	2–1	2–3	—	—
Surin Khong Chee Mool	0–0	1–0	—	2–2	4–2	2–2	2–4	—	2–2	1–2	—
Ubon Kruanapat	—	2–1	5–0	—	2–2	2–1	1–0	—	—	0–2	1–1
Udon United	5–2	—	7–0	3–2	3–1	3–2	8–0	4–1	2–1	—	—
Yasothon	4–2	—	2–0	0–1	2–0	0–0	1–0	3–0	0–1	1–1	—

Source: Thai League
Legend: Blue = home team win; Yellow = draw; Red = away team win.
For upcoming matches, an "a" indicates there is an article about the rivalry between the two participants.

== Season statistics ==
=== Top scorers ===
As of 3 January 2021.

Rank	Player	Club	Goals
1	(Brazil) Jardel Capistrano	Udon United	22
2	(Ivory Coast) Diarra Junior Aboubacar	Muang Loei United	11
2	(Brazil) Vinicius Silva Freitas	Nakhon Ratchasima United	11
2	(Thailand) Chawin Thirawatsri	Udon United	11
5	(Thailand) Apiwat Chuenban	Surin Khong Chee Mool	9
6	(Thailand) Phakhawat Poonachaing	Yasothon	8
7	(Thailand) Jakkrawut Songma	Udon United	7
8	(Thailand) Nattawut Wuttiya	Surin Khong Chee Mool	6
8	(Thailand) Saran Srideth	Ubon Kruanapat	6
10	(Thailand) Phanu Wanchuphloed	Khon Kaen Mordindang	5

=== Hat-tricks ===
Player	For	Against	Result	Date
(Brazil) Jardel Capistrano^{5}	Udon United	Surin City	8–0 (H)	3 October 2020
(Ivory Coast) Diarra Junior Aboubacar	Muang Loei United	Nakhon Ratchasima United	7–1 (H)	15 November 2020
(Brazil) Jardel Capistrano	Udon United	Nakhon Ratchasima United	3–1 (H)	13 December 2020
(Brazil) Célio Guilherme da Silva Santos	Muang Loei United	Khon Kaen Mordindang	4–0 (H)	26 December 2020
(Thailand) Chawin Thirawatsri^{4}	Udon United	Mahasarakham	9–2 (A)	27 December 2020
(Thailand) Phanu Wanchuphloed	Khon Kaen Mordindang	Ubon Kruanapat	5–0 (H)	2 January 2021
(Brazil) Jardel Capistrano	Udon United	Sakon Nakhon	3–2 (A)	3 January 2021

Notes: ^{4} = Player scored 4 goals; ^{5} = Player scored 5 goals; (H) = Home team; (A) = Away team

=== Clean sheets ===
As of 3 January 2021.

Rank	Player	Club	Clean sheets
1	(Thailand) Banharn Karin	Muang Loei United	8
2	(Thailand) Panuwat Sritongdee	Udon United	5
3	(Thailand) Ratchaphon Thiamsorn	Chaiyaphum United	3
3	(Thailand) Naphat Kongjandee	Sakon Nakhon	3
3	(Thailand) Suttipong Seankla	Ubon Kruanapat	3
3	(Thailand) Jetsada Bunrueng	Yasothon	3

== See also ==
- 2020–21 Thai League 1
- 2020–21 Thai League 2
- 2020–21 Thai League 3
- 2020–21 Thai League 3 Northern Region
- 2020–21 Thai League 3 Eastern Region
- 2020–21 Thai League 3 Western Region
- 2020–21 Thai League 3 Southern Region
- 2020–21 Thai League 3 Bangkok Metropolitan Region
- 2020–21 Thai League 3 National Championship
- 2020–21 Thai FA Cup
- 2020 Thailand Champions Cup
