= Witthawin Klorwuttiwat =

Thai footballer (born 1991)

Personal information
- Full name: Witthawin Klorwuttiwat
- Date of birth: 29 August 1991 (age 35)
- Place of birth: Chiang Mai, Thailand
- Height: 1.80 m (5 ft 11 in)
- Position: Centre back

Team information
- Current team: Bangkok
- Number: 4

Senior career*
Years	Team	Apps	(Gls)
2013	Pattaya United	1	(0)
2013–2015	Chainat	0	(0)
2016	Sukhothai	1	(0)
2017–2019	Nongbua Pitchaya	14	(0)
2020–2025	Lamphun Warrior	70	(0)
2025–	Bangkok	29	(0)

International career
- Thailand U17
2009–2010	Thailand U19		
2009–2015	Thailand U23		
- * Club domestic league appearances and goals

Witthawin Klorwuttiwat (Thai: วิธวินทร์ คลอวุฒิวัฒน์, born August 29, 1991) is a Thai professional footballer who plays as a centre back for Thai League 2 club Bangkok.

== Honour ==
Lamphun Warrior

- Thai League 3 (1): 2020–21
- Thai League 2 (1): 2021–22
