= 2020–21 Thai League 3 Bangkok Metropolitan Region =

Thai League 3 Bangkok Metropolitan Region
- Season: 2020–21
- Dates: 3 October 2020 – 3 January 2021
- Champions: North Bangkok University
- T3 National Championship: North Bangkok University; Bangkok
- Matches: 140
- Goals: 380 (2.71 per match)
- Top goalscorer: (Cameroon) Moussa Abakar (11 goals; Prime Bangkok)
- Biggest home win: 7 goals difference Bangkok 7–0 Royal Thai Air Force (18 November 2020)
- Biggest away win: 7 goals difference Royal Thai Army 0–7 North Bangkok University (10 October 2020)
- Highest scoring: 9 goals Kasem Bundit University 3–6 Nonthaburi United S.Boonmeerit (3 January 2021)
- Longest winning run: 9 matches North Bangkok University
- Longest unbeaten run: 14 matches Nonthaburi United S.Boonmeerit; Prime Bangkok
- Longest winless run: 14 matches Inter Bangkok
- Longest losing run: 7 matches Royal Thai Air Force

The 2020–21 Thai League 3 Bangkok metropolitan region is a region in the regional stage of the 2020–21 Thai League 3. Due to the COVID-19 pandemic, the season must be postponed to start in late 2020 and end in early 2021. In addition, the Thai League 4 had combined with the Thai League 3 and compete as Thai League 3 since this season and there is no relegation in this season. A total of 14 teams located in Central and Bangkok Metropolitan Region of Thailand will compete in the league of the Bangkok metropolitan region.

In late December 2020, COVID-19 had spread again in Thailand, the FA Thailand must abruptly end the regional stage of the Thai League 3. The second-placed and the third-placed of the Bangkok metropolitan region have the similar points, so they must play-off to find a team to qualified to the national championship stage.

== Teams ==
=== Number of teams by province ===
Position	Province	Number	Teams
1	Bangkok	6	Chamchuri United, Grakcu Sai Mai United, Inter Bangkok, Kasem Bundit University, Prime Bangkok, and Thonburi United
2	Nonthaburi	3	Nonthaburi United S.Boonmeerit, Siam, and STK Muangnont
2	Pathum Thani	3	Bangkok, North Bangkok University, and Royal Thai Air Force
3	Nakhon Nayok	1	Royal Thai Army
3	Samut Prakan	1	Samut Prakan

=== Stadiums and locations ===
Locations of the 2020–21 Thai League 3 Bangkok Metropolitan region teams

Team	Location	Stadium	Coordinates
Bangkok	Pathum Thani (Khlong Luang)	Bangkok University Stadium	14°02′19″N 100°36′08″E
Chamchuri United	Bangkok (Pathum Wan)	Chulalongkorn University Stadium	13°44′14″N 100°31′33″E
Grakcu Sai Mai United	Bangkok (Sai Mai)	Grakcu Sai Mai Stadium	13°53′54″N 100°37′46″E
Inter Bangkok	Bangkok (Minburi)	72nd Anniversary Stadium (Min Buri)	13°48′08″N 100°47′28″E
Kasem Bundit University	Bangkok (Minburi)	Kasem Bundit University Stadium	13°48′06″N 100°44′06″E
Nonthaburi United S.Boonmeerit	Nonthaburi (Bang Yai)	Nonthaburi Provincial Stadium	13°51′03″N 100°26′28″E
North Bangkok University	Pathum Thani (Thanyaburi)	North Bangkok University Stadium	14°00′22″N 100°40′24″E
Prime Bangkok	Bangkok (Bang Kapi)	Ramkhamhaeng University Stadium	13°45′16″N 100°37′00″E
Royal Thai Air Force	Pathum Thani (Lam Luk Ka)	Thupatemi Stadium	13°57′04″N 100°37′30″E
Royal Thai Army	Nakhon Nayok (Mueang)	Chulachomklao Royal Military Academy Stadium	14°17′29″N 101°10′02″E
Samut Prakan	Samut Prakan (Bang Sao Thong)	Samut Prakan Stadium	13°34′45″N 100°47′41″E
Siam	Nonthaburi (Bang Yai)	Nonthaburi Provincial Stadium	13°51′03″N 100°26′28″E
STK Muangnont	Nonthaburi (Mueang)	Nonthaburi Youth Centre	13°52′44″N 100°32′39″E
Thonburi United	Bangkok (Nong Khaem)	Thonburi Stadium	13°43′28″N 100°20′43″E

Locations of teams in Bangkok Metropolitan region

=== Foreign players ===
A T3 team could register 3 foreign players from foreign players all around the world. A team can use 3 foreign players on the field in each game.

Note :
(substituted off) : players who released during second leg transfer window;
(substituted in) : players who registered during second leg transfer window.

AFC member countries players.
CAF member countries players.
CONCACAF member countries players.
CONMEBOL member countries players.
OFC member countries players.
UEFA member countries players.
No foreign player registered.

Club	Leg	Player 1	Player 2	Player 3
Bangkok	1st	(New Zealand) Kayne Vincent (substituted off)	(France) Charles Houla	(New Zealand) Keegan Linderboom
Bangkok	2nd	(Ivory Coast) Dicko Ibrahim Abou (substituted in)	(France) Charles Houla	(New Zealand) Keegan Linderboom
Chamchuri United	1st	(Brazil) Pedro Henrique (substituted off)	(Cameroon) Isaac Honore Aime Mbengan	(South Korea) Yeon Gi-sung
Chamchuri United	2nd	(South Korea) Park Jae-hyeong (substituted in)	(Cameroon) Isaac Honore Aime Mbengan	(South Korea) Yeon Gi-sung
Grakcu Sai Mai United	1st	(Ghana) Sarfo Otis Adjei (substituted off)	(Ghana) Emmanuel Kwame Akadom	(Iran) Ali Mohammadi
Grakcu Sai Mai United	2nd	(South Africa) Mahodi Nelson (substituted in)	(Ghana) Emmanuel Kwame Akadom	(Iran) Ali Mohammadi
Inter Bangkok	1st	(Brazil) Carlos Damian dos Santos Puentes (substituted off)	(Brazil) Caio da Conceicao Silva (substituted off)	(Brazil) Victor Clemente de Oliveira
Inter Bangkok	2nd	(Egypt) Basam Radwan Mahmoud Mohamed Afify (substituted in)	(Iran) Nima Mirzajani Tafreshi (substituted in)	(Brazil) Victor Clemente de Oliveira
Kasem Bundit University	1st		(Ivory Coast) Dicko Ibrahim Abou (substituted off)	(Ivory Coast) Ange Didier Merveil Kere (substituted off)
Kasem Bundit University	2nd	(Brazil) Carlos Damian dos Santos Puentes (substituted in)	(Brazil) Ranieri Luiz Barbosa (substituted in)	(Azerbaijan) Mommod Bokir Oglu Mammad (substituted in)
Nonthaburi United S.Boonmeerit	1st	(Egypt) Ahmed Ayman Shamsaldin Abdalazem (substituted off)	(France) Joël Sami	(Japan) Kii Hiromu
Nonthaburi United S.Boonmeerit	2nd	(Brazil) Carlos Eduardo dos Santos Lima (substituted in)	(France) Joël Sami	(Japan) Kii Hiromu
North Bangkok University	1st		(Republic of the Congo) Itubu Adeno Kevin (substituted off)	(Egypt) Ahmed Essam Lotfy Elazab
North Bangkok University	2nd	(Egypt) Ahmed Ayman Shamsaldin Abdalazem (substituted in)	(Ivory Coast) Coulibaly Chomana (substituted in)	(Egypt) Ahmed Essam Lotfy Elazab
Prime Bangkok	1st	(Cameroon) Ahmadou Tidjani	(Cameroon) Moussa Abakar	(Cameroon) Nguimbus Ferdinand
Prime Bangkok	2nd	(Cameroon) Ahmadou Tidjani	(Cameroon) Moussa Abakar	(Cameroon) Nguimbus Ferdinand
Royal Thai Air Force	1st
Royal Thai Air Force	2nd
Royal Thai Army	1st
Royal Thai Army	2nd
Samut Prakan	1st	(Brazil) Augusto Cezar Marques Pereira (substituted off)	(Guinea) Conde Mamoudou (substituted off)	(Uganda) Michael Masabe (substituted off)
Samut Prakan	2nd	(Ivory Coast) Cheick Barou Diaby (substituted in)	(Guinea) Diop Badara Aly (substituted in)	(Japan) Oigawa Nozomi (substituted in)
Siam	1st	(Ghana) Oscar Plape (substituted off)	(Iran) Meysam Aboofazeli (substituted off)	(Ivory Coast) Dennis Borketey Bortier
Siam	2nd	(Ghana) Sarfo Otis Adjei (substituted in)	(Iran) Hossein Doust Darsefidmazgi (substituted in)	(Ivory Coast) Dennis Borketey Bortier
STK Muangnont	1st
STK Muangnont	2nd	(Brazil) Fabricio Peris Carneiro (substituted in)	(Ivory Coast) Kourouma Mohamed (substituted in)	(Ivory Coast) Oumar Sanou (substituted in)
Thonburi United	1st	(Ivory Coast) Joseph Louis Kissi (substituted off)	(Liberia) Melvin Kicmett
Thonburi United	2nd	(Guinea) Conde Mamoudou (substituted in)	(Liberia) Melvin Kicmett

== League table ==
=== Standings ===
Pos	Team	Pld	W	D	L	GF	GA	GD	Pts	Qualification or relegation
1	North Bangkok University (Q)	20	14	4	2	39	10	+29	46	Qualification to the National Championship stage
2	Nonthaburi United S.Boonmeerit	20	13	5	2	41	18	+23	44	Qualification to the National Championship stage play-offs
3	Bangkok (O, Q)	20	13	5	2	40	18	+22	44	Qualification to the National Championship stage play-offs
4	Chamchuri United	20	10	6	4	43	20	+23	36	
5	Prime Bangkok	20	8	9	3	26	24	+2	33	
6	STK Muangnont	20	9	4	7	26	19	+7	31	
7	Kasem Bundit University	20	8	5	7	31	32	−1	29	
8	Thonburi United	20	7	7	6	31	25	+6	28	
9	Grakcu Sai Mai United	20	6	5	9	20	26	−6	23	
10	Royal Thai Army	20	5	7	8	18	33	−15	22	
11	Royal Thai Air Force	20	5	3	12	19	43	−24	18	
12	Samut Prakan	20	2	6	12	15	36	−21	12	
13	Siam	20	2	3	15	19	41	−22	9	
14	Inter Bangkok	20	1	5	14	12	35	−23	8	

Source: Thai League
Rules for classification: 1) Points; 2) Head-to-head points; 3) Head-to-head goal difference; 4) Head-to-head goal scored; 5) Overall goal difference; 6) Overall goal scored; 7) Fair play points; 8) Play-off without extra time).
(O) Play-off winners; (Q) Qualified for the phase indicated

=== Positions by round ===
Team ╲ Round	1	2	3	4	5	6	7	8	9	10	11	12	13	14	15	16	17	18	19	20
North Bangkok University	7	9	7	5	3	2	1	1	1	1	1	1	1	1	1	1	1	1	1	1
Nonthaburi United S.Boonmeerit	8	3	3	2	7	7	6	3	3	4	3	3	2	2	2	2	3	3	3	2
Bangkok	6	4	2	1	6	4	3	2	5	3	4	4	4	4	4	3	2	2	2	3
Chamchuri United	1	2	1	6	4	3	5	6	2	2	2	2	3	3	3	4	4	4	4	4
Prime Bangkok	9	6	5	8	8	9	8	8	8	8	7	6	6	7	7	7	5	5	5	5
STK Muangnont	5	1	6	4	2	5	2	4	4	5	5	5	5	5	5	5	7	6	6	6
Kasem Bundit University	3	5	4	3	1	1	4	5	6	6	6	7	7	6	6	6	6	7	7	7
Thonburi United	2	8	8	7	5	6	7	7	7	7	8	8	8	8	8	8	8	8	8	8
Grakcu Sai Mai United	11	11	11	11	13	14	14	12	11	11	11	9	9	9	9	9	9	9	9	9
Royal Thai Army	4	7	9	9	10	12	10	10	10	10	10	11	10	10	10	10	10	10	10	10
Royal Thai Air Force	13	10	10	12	9	8	9	9	9	9	9	10	11	11	11	11	11	11	11	11
Samut Prakan	14	14	14	10	12	13	13	14	14	14	14	12	14	14	14	12	12	12	12	12
Siam	10	12	13	14	11	10	11	11	12	12	12	13	12	12	12	13	13	14	14	13
Inter Bangkok	12	13	12	13	14	11	12	13	13	13	13	14	13	13	13	14	14	13	13	14

Source: Thai League
= Qualification to the National Championship stage; = Qualification to the National Championship stage play-offs

=== Results by round ===
Team ╲ Round	1	2	3	4	5	6	7	8	9	10	11	12	13	14	15	16	17	18	19	20
North Bangkok University	D	D	W	W	W	W	W	W	W	W	W	L	W	L	W	W	D	D	W	W
Nonthaburi United S.Boonmeerit	D	W	W	W	L	L	W	W	D	W	W	W	W	W	W	D	D	D	W	W
Bangkok	D	W	W	W	L	W	W	D	L	W	D	W	D	W	W	W	W	D	W	W
Chamchuri United	W	D	W	L	W	W	D	D	W	W	W	W	L	W	D	D	L	D	W	L
Prime Bangkok	D	W	W	L	L	L	W	W	D	D	W	W	D	D	W	D	W	D	D	D
STK Muangnont	W	W	L	W	W	D	W	L	D	W	L	W	L	W	D	L	L	W	D	L
Kasem Bundit University	W	D	W	W	W	W	L	L	D	L	W	L	L	W	W	D	D	D	L	L
Thonburi United	W	D	L	W	W	L	D	W	D	L	D	L	W	W	L	D	D	W	L	D
Grakcu Sai Mai United	L	L	D	L	L	L	L	W	L	W	W	W	W	D	W	L	D	D	L	D
Royal Thai Army	W	D	L	L	L	L	W	L	W	D	L	D	D	L	L	W	D	D	W	D
Royal Thai Air Force	L	D	L	L	W	W	L	W	W	L	L	L	L	L	L	L	D	L	D	W
Samut Prakan	L	L	L	W	L	L	L	L	D	L	L	D	L	L	L	W	D	D	D	D
Siam	L	L	L	L	W	D	L	L	L	L	L	L	W	L	L	L	D	L	L	D
Inter Bangkok	L	L	D	L	L	W	L	L	L	L	L	L	D	L	L	D	D	D	L	L

Source: Thai League
W = Won; D = Drawn; L = Lost

=== Results ===
Home \ Away	BKK	CCU	GSU	IBK	KBU	NUS	NBU	PBK	AIR	ARM	SPK	SIA	SMN	TBU
Bangkok	—	1–0	3–1	1–0	4–2	1–0	2–2	—	7–0	—	5–3	2–0	2–1	—
Chamchuri United	0–0	—	4–2	4–0	2–0	3–3	—	5–0	—	2–0	5–1	3–0	2–0	1–0
Grakcu Sai Mai United	1–2	0–0	—	2–1	1–2	1–3	1–0	0–0	—	1–0	—	—	0–1	2–1
Inter Bangkok	—	—	1–1	—	0–1	—	0–3	2–3	1–2	0–0	1–0	1–2	0–2	1–1
Kasem Bundit University	1–2	—	2–2	—	—	3–6	—	2–0	2–2	1–1	0–0	3–0	1–0	1–2
Nonthaburi United S.Boonmeerit	0–0	1–0	1–0	3–1	4–0	—	0–1	1–1	2–1	—	2–1	2–0	—	—
North Bangkok University	—	2–0	—	2–1	2–1	1–1	—	2–2	2–0	1–0	3–0	—	1–0	0–0
Prime Bangkok	1–1	2–1	2–1	—	2–2	—	0–1	—	3–0	1–1	0–0	2–1	—	3–2
Royal Thai Air Force	—	1–4	1–0	2–0	0–3	1–2	0–3	—	—	0–1	3–1	—	1–1	2–0
Royal Thai Army	2–1	2–2	0–0	—	0–1	0–2	0–7	—	—	—	—	2–1	1–0	1–1
Samut Prakan	0–1	—	0–1	0–0	—	0–3	—	0–1	2–2	2–2	—	2–1	1–4	1–2
Siam	1–3	—	2–3	1–1	2–3	—	0–2	1–1	2–1	3–4	0–1	—	1–1	—
STK Muangnont	1–0	3–3	—	3–0	—	1–3	0–3	0–0	3–0	2–0	—	2–0	—	1–0
Thonburi United	2–2	2–2	—	2–1	—	2–2	2–1	1–2	4–0	5–1	0–0	2–1	—	—

Source: Thai League
Legend: Blue = home team win; Yellow = draw; Red = away team win.
For upcoming matches, an "a" indicates there is an article about the rivalry between the two participants.

== Season statistics ==
=== Top scorers ===
As of 3 January 2021.

Rank	Player	Club	Goals
1	(Cameroon) Moussa Abakar	Prime Bangkok	11
2	(Cameroon) Isaac Honore Aime Mbengan	Chamchuri United	9
2	(South Korea) Yeon Gi-sung	Chamchuri United	9
2	(Thailand) Teerasak Poeiphimai	Prime Bangkok	9
5	(Ghana) Emmanuel Kwame Akadom	Grakcu Sai Mai United	8
5	(Ivory Coast) Dicko Ibrahim Abou	Kasem Bundit University (4), Bangkok (4)	8
7	(Thailand) Bunlue Thongkliang	Bangkok	7
7	(Thailand) Woraphot Somsrang	Nonthaburi United S.Boonmeerit	7
7	(Thailand) Chanotaj Pipatmongkonchai	North Bangkok University	7

=== Hat-tricks ===
Player	For	Against	Result	Date
(Thailand) Chanotaj Pipatmongkonchai	North Bangkok University	Royal Thai Army	7–0 (A)	10 October 2020
(Thailand) Teerasak Poeiphimai	Prime Bangkok	Thonburi United	3–2 (H)	14 October 2020
(South Korea) Yeon Gi-sung	Chamchuri United	Prime Bangkok	5–0 (H)	21 October 2020
(Brazil) Carlos Eduardo dos Santos Lima^{4}	Nonthaburi United S.Boonmeerit	Kasem Bundit University	6–3 (A)	3 January 2021

Notes: ^{4} = Player scored 4 goals; (H) = Home team; (A) = Away team

=== Clean sheets ===
As of 3 January 2021.

Rank	Player	Club	Clean sheets
1	(Thailand) Sanan Amkoed	North Bangkok University	10
2	(Thailand) Supazin Hnupichai	STK Muangnont	9
3	(Thailand) Chitchana Thaksinpila	Kasem Bundit University	7
4	(Thailand) Nattapon Meesaeng	Nonthaburi United S.Boonmeerit	6
5	(Thailand) Kritchai Sangrung	Chamchuri United	5
5	(Thailand) Yutthasit Chatmueang	Prime Bangkok	5
5	(Thailand) Saree Rakpromrach	Samut Prakan	5

== See also ==
- 2020–21 Thai League 1
- 2020–21 Thai League 2
- 2020–21 Thai League 3
- 2020–21 Thai League 3 Northern Region
- 2020–21 Thai League 3 Northeastern Region
- 2020–21 Thai League 3 Eastern Region
- 2020–21 Thai League 3 Western Region
- 2020–21 Thai League 3 Southern Region
- 2020–21 Thai League 3 National Championship
- 2020–21 Thai FA Cup
- 2020 Thailand Champions Cup
