= George Kelbel =

German-Ghanaian footballer

Personal information
- Full name: George Sebastian Kelbel
- Date of birth: 6 August 1992 (age 34)
- Place of birth: Hamburg, Germany
- Height: 1.77 m (5 ft 10 in)
- Position: Forward

Youth career
- –2004: Altona 93
- 2004–2011: Hamburger SV

Senior career*
Years	Team	Apps	(Gls)
2010–2013	Hamburger SV II	65	(17)
2013–2014	Holstein Kiel	7	(0)
2013–2014	Holstein Kiel II	9	(4)
2014–2015	Goslarer SC	33	(10)
2015–2016	Berliner AK	17	(1)
2015	Berliner AK II	1	(1)
2016	TSV Havelse	7	(0)
2016–2017	LSK Hansa	32	(5)
2017–2018	TSG Neustrelitz	34	(8)
2018–2019	Rot-Weiß Erfurt	29	(6)
2020	Rajpracha	2	(1)
2020–2021	Krabi	16	(15)
2021–2022	Teutonia Ottensen	23	(4)
- * Club domestic league appearances and goals as of 19:53, 19 September 2022 (UTC)

George Sebastian Kelbel (born 6 August 1992) is a German-Ghanaian footballer who most recently played as a forward for Teutonia Ottensen.

== Career ==
Kelbel made his professional debut for Holstein Kiel in the 3. Liga on 25 October 2013, coming on as a substitute in the 79th minute for Casper Johansen in the 0–0 away draw against SpVgg Unterhaching.
