= Surasak Thong-aon =

Thai footballer

Personal information
- Full name: Surasak Thong-aon
- Date of birth: 17 September 1994 (age 32)
- Place of birth: Thailand
- Height: 1.90 m (6 ft 3 in)
- Position: Goalkeeper

Team information
- Current team: Samut Songkhram City
- Number: 88

Senior career*
| Years | Team | Apps | (Gls) |
| 2015 | Dome | | |
| 2016 | Chainat | 0 | (0) |
| 2017–2019 | Air Force Central | 6 | (0) |
| 2020 | Uthai Thani | | |
| 2021–2022 | Lamphun Warriors | | |
| 2022–2023 | Phitsanulok | | |
| 2023 | PT Satun | | |
| 2024 | Chiangmai | | |
| 2025– | Samut Songkhram City | | |
- * Club domestic league appearances and goals

Surasak Thong-aon (Thai: สุรศักดิ์ ทองอ่อน;) is a Thai footballer who plays as a goalkeeper.
