= 2020–21 Thai League 3 =

- Season: 2020–21
- Dates: 3 October 2020 – 21 March 2021
- Champions: Lamphun Warriors
- Promoted: Lamphun Warriors; Muangkan United; Rajpracha

The 2020–21 Thai League 3 is the fourth season of the Thai League 3, the third-tier professional league for association football clubs in Thailand, since its establishment in 2017, also known as Omsin League Regional Championship due to the sponsorship deal with Government Savings Bank (Omsin Bank). Due to the COVID-19 pandemic in Thailand, the season must be postponed to start in late 2020 and end in early 2021. In addition, the Thai League 4 had combined with the Thai League 3 and compete as Thai League 3 since this season and there is no relegation in this season. A total of 72 teams would be divided into 6 regions including 11 teams in the Northern region, 11 teams in the Northeastern region, 12 teams in the Eastern region, 12 teams in the Western region, 12 teams in the Southern region, and 14 teams in the Bangkok metropolitan region.

== Regional stage ==
The number of teams in 6 regions including 11 teams in the Northern region, 11 teams in the Northeastern region, 12 teams in the Eastern region, 12 teams in the Western region, 12 teams in the Southern region, and 14 teams in the Bangkok metropolitan region.

The winners and runners-up of each region will advance to the national championship stage to finding 3 teams promoted to the 2021–22 Thai League 2.

In late December 2020, the COVID-19 had spread again in Thailand, the FA Thailand must abruptly end the regional stage of the Thai League 3.

=== Northern region ===
League table

Pos	Team	Pld	W	D	L	GF	GA	GD	Pts	Qualification or relegation
1	Lamphun Warriors (Q)	15	13	0	2	31	6	+25	39	Qualification to the National Championship stage
2	Maejo United	15	10	3	2	23	8	+15	33	Qualification to the National Championship stage play-offs
3	Phitsanulok (O, Q)	14	10	2	2	25	8	+17	32	Qualification to the National Championship stage play-offs
4	Uttaradit	15	8	1	6	22	18	+4	25	
5	Wat Bot City	16	8	0	8	25	17	+8	24	
6	See Khwae City	16	6	3	7	19	25	−6	21	
7	Nan	15	5	4	6	16	19	−3	19	
8	Chiangrai City	14	3	4	7	13	21	−8	13	
9	Kamphaengphet	15	3	4	8	11	22	−11	13	
10	Northern Tak United	16	3	1	12	11	33	−22	10	
11	Chiangrai Lanna	15	2	2	11	7	26	−19	8	

Source: Thai League
Rules for classification: 1) Points; 2) Head-to-head points; 3) Head-to-head goal difference; 4) Head-to-head goal scored; 5) Overall goal difference; 6) Overall goal scored; 7) Fair play points; 8) Play-off without extra time).
(O) Play-off winners; (Q) Qualified for the phase indicated

=== Northeastern region ===
League table

Pos	Team	Pld	W	D	L	GF	GA	GD	Pts	Qualification or relegation
1	Udon United (Q)	16	15	1	0	63	17	+46	46	Qualification to the National Championship stage
2	Muang Loei United (Q)	15	12	1	2	35	9	+26	37	Qualification to the National Championship stage
3	Yasothon	15	8	3	4	21	13	+8	27	
4	Ubon Kruanapat	15	8	3	4	25	21	+4	27	
5	Surin City	16	5	3	8	23	30	−7	18	
6	Nakhon Ratchasima United	16	4	4	8	25	38	−13	16	
7	Surin Khong Chee Mool	16	3	6	7	25	33	−8	15	
8	Chaiyaphum United	15	2	8	5	16	24	−8	14	
9	Khon Kaen Mordindang	15	3	3	9	18	28	−10	12	
10	Sakon Nakhon	16	2	6	8	15	25	−10	12	
11	Mahasarakham	15	3	2	10	17	45	−28	11	

Source: Thai League
Rules for classification: 1) Points; 2) Head-to-head points; 3) Head-to-head goal difference; 4) Head-to-head goal scored; 5) Overall goal difference; 6) Overall goal scored; 7) Fair play points; 8) Play-off without extra time).
(Q) Qualified for the phase indicated

=== Eastern region ===
League table

Pos	Team	Pld	W	D	L	GF	GA	GD	Pts	Qualification or relegation
1	Pluakdaeng United (Q)	17	12	3	2	43	15	+28	39	Qualification to the National Championship stage
2	Chachoengsao Hi-Tek (Q)	17	11	5	1	37	9	+28	38	Qualification to the National Championship stage
3	Bankhai United	16	10	1	5	33	16	+17	31	
4	Banbueng	16	7	4	5	29	28	+1	25	
5	Saimit Kabin United	17	6	7	4	13	17	−4	25	
6	Marines Eureka	17	7	3	7	21	22	−1	24	
7	Assawin Kohkwang United	16	6	3	7	23	28	−5	21	
8	Pattaya Discovery United	16	4	5	7	21	34	−13	17	
9	ACDC	16	4	3	9	15	22	−7	15	
10	Sakaeo	15	3	4	8	16	29	−13	13	
11	Chanthaburi	16	2	5	9	13	26	−13	11	
12	Royal Thai Fleet	17	2	5	10	13	31	−18	11	

Source: Thai League
Rules for classification: 1) Points; 2) Head-to-head points; 3) Head-to-head goal difference; 4) Head-to-head goal scored; 5) Overall goal difference; 6) Overall goal scored; 7) Fair play points; 8) Play-off without extra time).
(Q) Qualified for the phase indicated

=== Western region ===
League table

Pos	Team	Pld	W	D	L	GF	GA	GD	Pts	Qualification or relegation
1	Muangkan United (Q)	17	13	3	1	50	13	+37	42	Qualification to the National Championship stage
2	Rajpracha (Q)	17	12	3	2	40	10	+30	39	Qualification to the National Championship stage
3	Angthong	17	12	2	3	36	10	+26	38	
4	Singha Golden Bells Kanchanaburi	17	6	6	5	19	22	−3	24	
5	Bang Pa-in Ayutthaya	16	7	2	7	21	17	+4	23	
6	Assumption United	17	6	2	9	19	20	−1	20	
7	Pathumthani University	17	6	2	9	14	23	−9	20	
8	Saraburi United	17	4	7	6	19	34	−15	19	
9	Hua Hin City	17	4	5	8	16	27	−11	17	
10	Samut Songkhram	16	4	5	7	12	23	−11	17	
11	Kanjanapat	17	3	3	11	9	33	−24	12	
12	Thawi Watthana Samut Sakhon United	17	3	2	12	15	38	−23	11	

Source: Thai League
Rules for classification: 1) Points; 2) Head-to-head points; 3) Head-to-head goal difference; 4) Head-to-head goal scored; 5) Overall goal difference; 6) Overall goal scored; 7) Fair play points; 8) Play-off without extra time).
(Q) Qualified for the phase indicated

=== Southern region ===
League table

Pos	Team	Pld	W	D	L	GF	GA	GD	Pts	Qualification or relegation
1	Songkhla (Q)	16	12	1	3	29	16	+13	37	Qualification to the National Championship stage
2	Krabi (Q)	17	10	5	2	43	17	+26	35	Qualification to the National Championship stage
3	Nara United	17	9	4	4	30	15	+15	31	
4	Nakhon Si United	16	9	2	5	30	17	+13	29	
5	Pattani	16	7	7	2	19	7	+12	28	
6	Trang	16	7	5	4	19	13	+6	26	
7	Jalor City	17	6	4	7	20	24	−4	22	
8	Surat Thani City	17	5	5	7	17	23	−6	20	
9	Satun United	17	5	4	8	29	23	+6	19	
10	Patong City	17	3	2	12	16	36	−20	11	
11	Surat Thani	16	3	1	12	11	53	−42	10	
12	Phatthalung	16	3	0	13	15	34	−19	9	

Source: Thai League
Rules for classification: 1) Points; 2) Head-to-head points; 3) Head-to-head goal difference; 4) Head-to-head goal scored; 5) Overall goal difference; 6) Overall goal scored; 7) Fair play points; 8) Play-off without extra time).
(Q) Qualified for the phase indicated

=== Bangkok Metropolitan region ===
League table

Pos	Team	Pld	W	D	L	GF	GA	GD	Pts	Qualification or relegation
1	North Bangkok University (Q)	20	14	4	2	39	10	+29	46	Qualification to the National Championship stage
2	Nonthaburi United S.Boonmeerit	20	13	5	2	41	18	+23	44	Qualification to the National Championship stage play-offs
3	Bangkok (O, Q)	20	13	5	2	40	18	+22	44	Qualification to the National Championship stage play-offs
4	Chamchuri United	20	10	6	4	43	20	+23	36	
5	Prime Bangkok	20	8	9	3	26	24	+2	33	
6	STK Muangnont	20	9	4	7	26	19	+7	31	
7	Kasem Bundit University	20	8	5	7	31	32	−1	29	
8	Thonburi United	20	7	7	6	31	25	+6	28	
9	Grakcu Sai Mai United	20	6	5	9	20	26	−6	23	
10	Royal Thai Army	20	5	7	8	18	33	−15	22	
11	Royal Thai Air Force	20	5	3	12	19	43	−24	18	
12	Samut Prakan	20	2	6	12	15	36	−21	12	
13	Siam	20	2	3	15	19	41	−22	9	
14	Inter Bangkok	20	1	5	14	12	35	−23	8	

Source: Thai League
Rules for classification: 1) Points; 2) Head-to-head points; 3) Head-to-head goal difference; 4) Head-to-head goal scored; 5) Overall goal difference; 6) Overall goal scored; 7) Fair play points; 8) Play-off without extra time).
(O) Play-off winners; (Q) Qualified for the phase indicated

== National championship stage ==
The national championship stage is the next stage from the regional stage. 1st and 2nd places of each zone qualified for this stage by featured in 2 groups. Teams from Northern, Northeastern, and Eastern regions would have qualified to the upper group. Meanwhile, teams from Western, Southern, and Bangkok Metropolitan regions would have qualified to the lower group. Winners, runners-ups, and third-placed of the national championship stage would be promoted to the 2021–22 Thai League 2.

=== Play-off round ===
Team 1	Score	Team 2
Northern region
Maejo United	1–2	Phitsanulok
Bangkok metropolitan region
Nonthaburi United S.Boonmeerit	2–6	Bangkok

=== Group stage ===
Upper region

Pos	Team	Pld	W	D	L	GF	GA	GD	Pts	Qualification	LPW	UDU	CCH	PDU	PLK	MLU
1	Lamphun Warriors (C, P)	5	4	0	1	8	5	+3	12	Qualification to the final and promotion to the 2021–22 Thai League 2	—	0–3	1–0	—	3–0	—
2	Udon United	5	3	1	1	8	3	+5	10	Qualification to the third place play-off	—	—	3–1	0–0	0–1	—
3	Chachoengsao Hi-Tek	5	3	0	2	11	5	+6	9		—	—	—	2–1	—	7–0
4	Pluakdaeng United	5	2	1	2	10	5	+5	7		1–2	—	—	—	4–1	4–0
5	Phitsanulok	5	1	1	3	2	8	−6	4		—	—	0–1	—	—	0–0
6	Muang Loei United	5	0	1	4	2	15	−13	1		1–2	1–2	—	—	—	—

Source: Thai League
Rules for classification: 1) Points; 2) Head-to-head points; 3) Goal difference; 4) Goals scored;).
(C) Champions; (P) Promoted

Lower region

Pos	Team	Pld	W	D	L	GF	GA	GD	Pts	Qualification	MKU	RAJ	KBI	SON	NBU	BKK
1	Muangkan United (P)	5	3	2	0	7	1	+6	11	Qualification to the final and promotion to the 2021–22 Thai League 2	—	1–1	—	3–0	—	2–0
2	Rajpracha (O, P)	5	3	1	1	10	5	+5	10	Qualification to the third place play-off	—	—	—	2–0	1–0	—
3	Krabi	5	2	1	2	6	6	0	7		0–1	1–0	—	—	—	—
4	Songkhla	5	1	2	2	6	10	−4	5		—	—	2–2	—	2–1	2–2
5	North Bangkok University	5	1	1	3	3	5	−2	4 (Note: North Bangkok University ahead on head-to-head record; North Bangkok University 3 pts, Bangkok 0 pts.)		0–0	—	1–2	—	—	1–0
6	Bangkok	5	1	1	3	7	12	−5	4		—	3–6	2–1	—	—	—

Source: Thai League
Rules for classification: 1) Points; 2) Head-to-head points; 3) Goal difference; 4) Goals scored;).
(O) Play-off winners; (P) Promoted

=== Knockout stage ===
Third place play-off

Team 1	Agg.	Team 2	1st leg	2nd leg
Udon United	1–2	Rajpracha	1–0	0–2

Final

Team 1	Agg.	Team 2	1st leg	2nd leg
Lamphun Warriors	3–2	Muangkan United	2–0	1–2 (a.e.t.)

== Teams promoted to 2021–22 Thai League 2 ==
- Lamphun Warriors (champions)
- Muangkan United (runners-up)
- Rajpracha (Third-placed)

== See also ==
- 2020–21 Thai League 1
- 2020–21 Thai League 2
- 2020–21 Thai League 3 Northern Region
- 2020–21 Thai League 3 Northeastern Region
- 2020–21 Thai League 3 Eastern Region
- 2020–21 Thai League 3 Western Region
- 2020–21 Thai League 3 Southern Region
- 2020–21 Thai League 3 Bangkok Metropolitan Region
- 2020–21 Thai League 3 National Championship
- 2020–21 Thai FA Cup
- 2020 Thailand Champions Cup
