= Anggello Machuca =

Paraguayan footballer (born 1984)

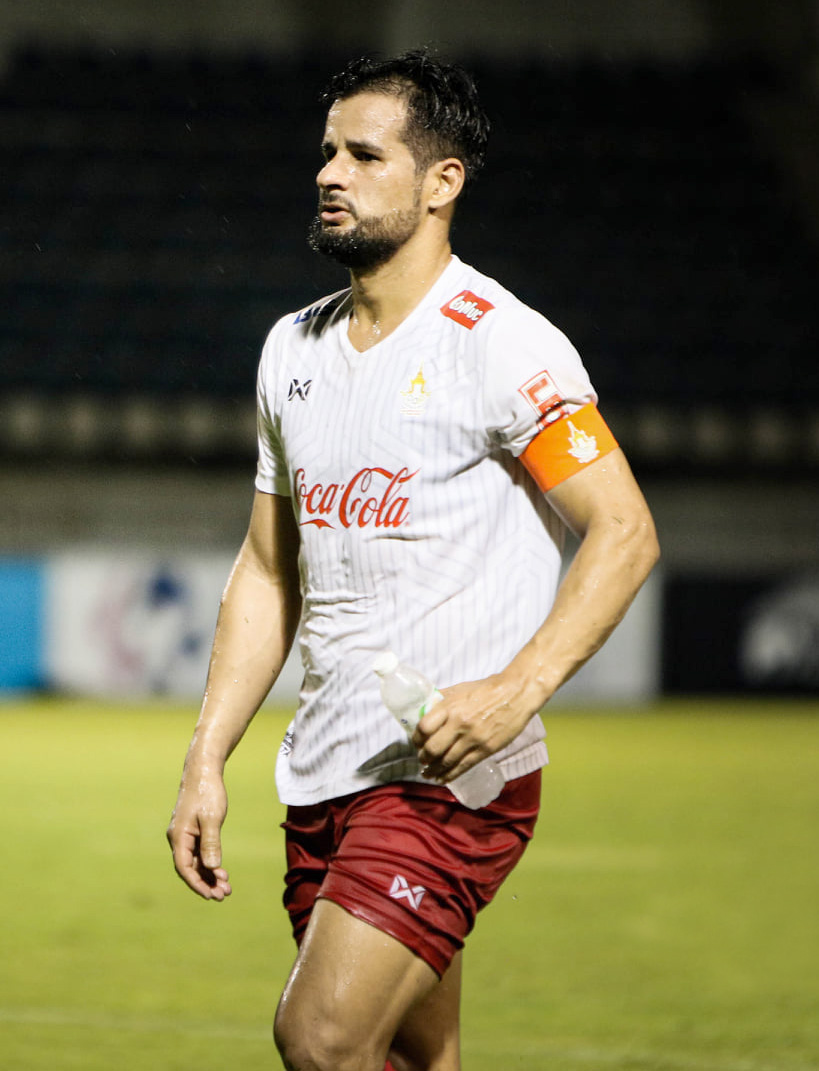
- Anggello Machuca playing for Rajpracha

Personal information
- Full name: Anggello Marcial Machuca
- Date of birth: 14 September 1984 (age 42)
- Place of birth: Paraguay
- Height: 1.83 m (6 ft 0 in)
- Position: Midfielder

Senior career*
Years	Team	Apps	(Gls)
2002–2005	Olimpia		
2006	New York F.C.		
2006	Zaria Bălți		
2007	Tiligul-Tiras Tiraspol		
2008	Tatabánya		
2009	Caaguazú		
2010	Cerro Porteño		
2010	San Lorenzo		
2010	BEC Tero Sasana	10	(0)
2011	Hanoi	17	(2)
2012	Paknampho NSRU	6	(1)
2013–2014	Chiangmai	46	(28)
2015–2016	Navy	61	(10)
2017	Rayong		
2017–2018	JL Chiangmai United		
2020–2022	Rajpracha	18	(4)
- * Club domestic league appearances and goals as of 27 December 2015

Anggello Machuca (born 14 September 1984) is a Paraguayan professional footballer who currently plays as a forward.
