= Noah Chivuta =

Zambian footballer (born 1983)

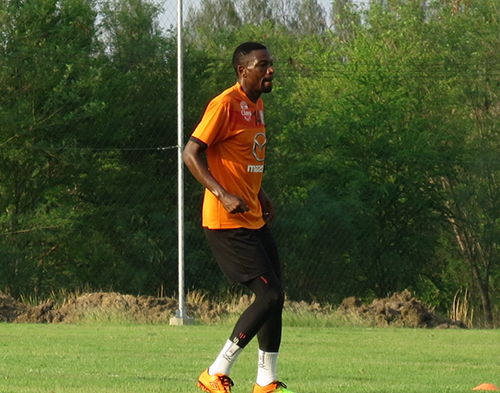

Personal information
- Date of birth: 25 December 1983 (age 42)
- Place of birth: Ndola, Zambia
- Height: 1.79 m (5 ft 10 1/2 in)
- Position: Midfielder

Team information
- Current team: Nakhon Ratchasima United
- Number: 14

Senior career*
Years	Team	Apps	(Gls)
2006–2008	Bidvest Wits	50	(9)
2008–2009	Supersport United	9	(0)
2009–2010	Maritzburg United	27	(4)
2010–2013	Free State Stars	61	(10)
2013–2016	Nakhon Ratchasima	55	(4)
2017–2018	Ayutthaya United	37	(7)
2019	Ayutthaya	10	(4)
2019–2020	Lamphun Warrior	11	(2)
2020–2021	Pluakdaeng United	22	(2)
2021	Sakaeo	13	(1)
2024–	Nakhon Ratchasima United	9	(3)

International career
2007–2016	Zambia	35	(5)
- * Club domestic league appearances and goals as of 26 February 2022

Noah Sikombe Chivuta (born 25 December 1983 in Ndola) is a Zambian footballer who plays for Nakhon Ratchasima United in Thai League 3 and the Zambia National Team.

== Career ==
Left-footed Chivuta has spent most of his playing career in South Africa.

- Year joined Stars: 2010
- Previous clubs: Roan United, Hellenic FC, Pietersburg Pillars, Dangerous Darkies, City Pillars, Bidvest Wits, Supersport United, Maritzburg United

Nakhon Ratchasima

Noah Chivuta joined Nakhon Ratchasima or Korat as the club is affectionately referred to in 2013 when they were in the Yamaha League 1 and helped them secure promotion to the Thai Premier League in the 2014 season.

Chivuta became the first Zambian player to win the Yamaha League 1 after helping Korat secure promotion in 2014, and has been putting up impressive performances in the Thai Premier League helping the club maintain their status in the 2015 season.

== International career ==
He scored on debut for Zambia in a COSAFA Cup match against Mozambique in September 2007.

Chivuta has made thirty five appearances for the Zambia National Team and was part of the team that won the Africa Cup of Nations in 2012.

== Honours ==
=== National team ===
Zambia

- Africa Cup of Nations: 2012 Champion
