= 2024–25 Bangkok F.C. season =

Bangkok
2024-25 season
- Chairman: (Thailand) Krisadee Tangjitthanomsin
- Manager: (Thailand) Kissakorn Krasaingoen
- Stadium: 72nd Anniversary Stadium, Thung Khru, Bangkok, Thailand
- Thai League T2: -
- Thai FA Cup: -
- Thai League Cup: -
- Top goalscorer: League: - All: -

The 2024–25 season is Bangkok's the club's 15th season since they renamed from Bangkok Bravo A.F.C in 2010. Also, this season is their first season back in the second tier in Thai Football since 2017 campaign.

On June 27, 2024, Thai League announced the program for the upcoming 2024-25 Thai League 2 season. The season commenced on August 10, 2024, and will conclude on April 26, 2025, while the play-off will play between May 3, 2025, and May 24, 2025.

== Players ==
As of 12 August 2024

Squad No.	Name	Nationality	Date of birth (age)	Previous club
Goalkeepers
1	Suntiparp Boonkilang	(Thailand)	2 August 1994 (age 31)	(Thailand) Samut Sakhon City F.C.
39	Nattapong Thongpum	(Thailand)	11 May 2000 (age 26)	(Thailand) Ranong United F.C.
45	Yannasit Sukchareon	(Thailand)	20 January 1998 (age 28)	(Thailand) Muangthong United F.C.
99	Natthasan Pakkarano	(Thailand)	20 February 2001 (age 25)	(Thailand) Muangthong United F.C.
Defenders
3	Thananat Rungrampan	(Thailand)	23 June 2000 (age 25)	(Thailand) Bangkok United F.C.
4	Banjong Phadungpattanodom (captain)	(Thailand)	11 October 1993 (age 32)	Youth team
5	Kittitach Pranithi	(Thailand)	30 April 1999 (age 27)	(Thailand) STK Muangnont F.C.
13	Piyarat Lajungreed	(Thailand)	18 September 1991 (age 34)	(Thailand) Sukhothai F.C.
14	Sakda Kumkun	(Thailand)	13 October 1989 (age 36)	(Thailand) Police Tero F.C.
26	Apisit Khuankwai	(Thailand)	30 March 1990 (age 36)	(Thailand) Nakhon Ratchasima F.C.
35	Siripong Kongjaopha	(Thailand)	4 February 1997 (age 29)	(Thailand) Dragon Pathumwan Kanchanaburi F.C.
36	Sitthichok Mool-on	(Thailand)	11 March 1999 (age 27)	(Thailand) Phuket Andaman F.C.
37	Phubordee Buangam	(Thailand)	19 August 2002 (age 23)	Youth team
40	Goshi Okubo	(Japan)	14 June 1986 (age 39)	(Thailand) Navy F.C.
Midfielders
6	Siwa Phommas	(Thailand)	14 January 1994 (age 32)	(Thailand) Sisaket F.C.
7	Charyl Chappuis	(Thailand) (Switzerland)	12 January 1992 (age 34)	(Thailand) Port F.C.
8	Seiya Kojima	(Japan)	2 June 1989 (age 36)	(Thailand) Suphanburi F.C.
11	Padungsak Phothinak	(Thailand)	5 February 1992 (age 34)	(Thailand) Samut Sakhon City F.C.
17	Phattharaphol Khamsuk	(Thailand)	22 July 1996 (age 29)	(Thailand) Ratchaburi F.C.
18	Watcharakorn Manoworn	(Thailand)	17 June 1996 (age 29)	(Thailand) Uthai Thani F.C.
19	Wachirawut Phudithip	(Thailand)	3 July 1999 (age 26)	(Thailand) Ubon Kruanapat F.C.
22	Chaowasit Sapysakunphon	(Thailand)	25 July 1995 (age 30)	(Thailand) Sukhothai F.C.
24	Rattapoom Lonlue	(Thailand)	22 August 2002 (age 23)	Youth team
Forwards
9	Amornthep Maundee	(Thailand)	27 October 2002 (age 23)	(Thailand) Chiangmai F.C.
10	Wichaya Pornprasart	(Thailand)	30 January 1995 (age 31)	(Thailand) Maejo United F.C.
16	Woraphot Somsang	(Thailand)	16 December 1993 (age 32)	(Thailand) Nonthaburi United F.C.
27	Kasitinard Sriphirom	(Thailand)		(Thailand) Chamchuri United F.C.
56	Carlos Eduardo dos Santos Lima	(Brazil)	28 November 1988 (age 37)	(Thailand) Hua Hin City F.C.
66	Bunlue Thongkliang	(Thailand)	6 May 1995 (age 31)	(Thailand) Suphanburi F.C.
77	Alex Amatavivadhana	(Thailand)	16 September 2002 (age 23)	Youth team
92	Simon Dia	(France) (Senegal)	17 July 1992 (age 33)	(Belgium) Olympic Charleroi
-	Phootran Gingpan	(Thailand)	5 May 2002 (age 24)	Youth team
Players loaned out / left during season

== Transfer ==
=== Pre-season transfer ===
==== In ====
Position	Player	Transferred from	Fee	Ref
DF	(Thailand) Piyarat Lajungreed	(Thailand) Sukhothai F.C.	Free	
MF	(Thailand) (Switzerland) Charyl Chappuis	(Thailand) Port F.C.	Free	
MF	(Thailand) Chaowasit Sapysakunphon	(Thailand) Sukhothai F.C.	Free	
DF	(Thailand) Apisit Khuankwai	(Thailand) Nakhon Ratchasima F.C.	Free	
MF	(Thailand) Watcharakorn Manoworn	(Thailand) Uthai Thani F.C.	Free	
FW	(Thailand) Amornthep Maundee	(Thailand) Chiangmai F.C.	Free	
FW	(France) (Senegal) Simon Dia	(Belgium) Olympic Charleroi	Free	
GK	(Thailand) Suntiparp Boonkilang	(Thailand) Samut Sakhon City F.C.	Free	
MF	(Thailand) Padungsak Phothinak	(Thailand) Samut Sakhon City F.C.	Free	

==== Loan In ====
Position	Player	Loaned From	Fee	Ref

==== Out ====
Position	Player	Transferred To	Fee	Ref
FW	(Brazil) Eydison	Unattached	End of contract	
GK	(Thailand) Narakorn Khonraengdee	Unattached	End of contract	
DF	(Thailand) Phongsakon Staschek	Unattached	End of contract	
DF	(Thailand) Kittiporn Chueachil	Unattached	End of contract	

==== Loan Out ====
Position	Player	Loaned To	Fee	Ref
DF	(Thailand) Supakorn Nutvijit	(Thailand) Nonthaburi United F.C.	Season loan	
FW	(Thailand) Sirodom Konsungnoen	(Thailand) Nonthaburi United F.C.	Season loan	
MF	(Thailand) Na-Pat Tangthanapholkul	(Thailand) Nonthaburi United F.C.	Season loan	
FW	(Thailand) Kiangsak Taobutr	(Thailand) Nonthaburi United F.C.	Season loan	

=== Mid-season transfer ===
==== In ====
Position	Player	Transferred from	Fee	Ref

==== Loan In ====
Position	Player	Loaned From	Fee	Ref

==== Out ====
Position	Player	Transferred To	Fee	Ref

==== Loan Out ====
Position	Player	Loaned To	Fee	Ref

== Competitions ==
=== Overview ===
Competition	First match	Last match	Starting round	Record							
Competition	First match	Last match	Starting round	Pld	W	D	L	GF	GA	GD	Win %
Thai League 2	11 August 2024	26 April 2025	Matchday 1	5	2	0	3	6	9	−3	40.00
FA Cup			First Round	0	0	0	0	0	0	+0	—
League Cup			First Round	0	0	0	0	0	0	+0	—
Total				5	2	0	3	6	9	−3	40.00

Last updated: 14 September 2024
Source: Competitions

=== Thai League 2 ===
==== League table ====
Pos	Team	Pld	W	D	L	GF	GA	GD	Pts	Qualification
6	Lampang (Q)	32	13	9	10	48	39	+9	48 (Note: Mahasarakham is ahead on the head-to-head record; Mahasarakham 4 pts , Lampang 1 pts.)	Play off to Thai League 1
7	Kasetsart	32	11	12	9	36	37	−1	45	
8	Bangkok	32	13	6	13	42	50	−8	45	
9	Nakhon Si United	32	13	5	14	51	52	−1	44	
10	Sisaket United	32	10	11	11	29	39	−10	41	

Updated to match(es) played on 28 April 2025. Source: Thai League
Rules for classification: 1) Points; 2) Head-to-head points; 3) Head-to-head goals difference; 4) Head-to-head goals scored; 5) Overall goals difference; 6) Overall goals scored; 7) Fair play points; 8) Play-off without extra time;).
(Q) Qualified for the phase indicated

==== Results summary ====
Overall								Home						Away					
Pld	W	D	L	GF	GA	GD	Pts	W	D	L	GF	GA	GD	W	D	L	GF	GA	GD
5	2	0	3	6	9	−3	6	1	0	1	2	2	0	1	0	2	4	7	−3

==== Matches ====
Win Draw Loss

11 August 2024 1	Bangkok	2-1	Ayutthaya United	Bangkok
	Lima 11'; Pantakan 66' (o.g.)		Pantakan 37'	Stadium: 72nd Anniversary Stadium; Attendance: 846; Referee: Samrit Ritkaew

17 August 2024 2	Chiangmai United	1-2	Bangkok	Chiang Mai
	Chonlawit 45+2'		Amornthep 28'; Lima 57'	Stadium: 700th Anniversary Stadium; Attendance: 1,033; Referee: Jirayu Lohapom

24 August 2024 3	Bangkok	0-1	Phrae United	Bangkok
			Wellington 4'	Stadium: 72nd Anniversary Stadium; Attendance: 779; Referee: Kitisak Pikunngoen

30 August 2024 4	Lampang	0-3	Bangkok	Lampang
			Rakpong 3'; Mehti 41'; Jirattikan 44'	Stadium: Lampang Provincial Stadium; Attendance: 920; Referee: Kriangkrai Thiphanunjarukorn

14 September 2024 5	Mahasarakham SBT	3-2	Bangkok	Mahasarakham
	Gan 8'; Kim 45' 53'		Lima 36'; Wachirawut 69'	Stadium: Mahasarakham Province Stadium; Attendance: 2,114; Referee: Anon Borisut

21 September 2024 6	Bangkok	v	Kasetsart	Bangkok
				Stadium: 72nd Anniversary Stadium

29 September 2024 7	Chainat Hornbill	v	Bangkok	Chainat
				Stadium: Khao Plong Stadium

6 October 2024 8	Bangkok	v	Chonburi	Bangkok
				Stadium: 72nd Anniversary Stadium

20 October 2024 9	Sisaket United	v	Bangkok	Sisaket
				Stadium: Sri Nakhon Lamduan Stadium

26 October 2024 10	Bangkok	v	Trat	Bangkok
				Stadium: 72nd Anniversary Stadium

=== Thai FA Cup ===
==== Matches ====
Win Draw Loss

=== Thai League Cup ===
==== Matches ====
Win Draw Loss

== Team statistics ==
=== Appearances and goals ===
As of 14 September 2024

No.	Pos.	Player	League		FA Cup		League Cup		Total	
No.	Pos.	Player	Apps.	Goals	Apps.	Goals	Apps.	Goals	Apps.	Goals
1	GK	(Thailand) Suntiparp Boonkilang	5	0	0	0	0	0	5	0
3	DF	(Thailand) Thananat Rungrampan	1	0	0	0	0	0	1	0
4	DF	(Thailand) Banjong Phadungpattanodom	2	0	0	0	0	0	2	0
5	DF	(Thailand) Kittitach Pranithi	3	0	0	0	0	0	3	0
6	MF	(Thailand) Siwa Phommas	4	0	0	0	0	0	4	0
7	MF	(Thailand) Charyl Chappuis	4	0	0	0	0	0	4	0
8	MF	(Japan) Seiya Kojima	4	0	0	0	0	0	4	0
9	FW	(Thailand) Amornthep Maundee	5	1	0	0	0	0	5	1
10	FW	(Thailand) Wichaya Pornprasart	5	0	0	0	0	0	5	0
11	MF	(Thailand) Padungsak Phothinak	5	0	0	0	0	0	5	0
13	DF	(Thailand) Piyarat Lajungreed	5	0	0	0	0	0	5	0
14	DF	(Thailand) Sakda Kumkun	5	0	0	0	0	0	5	0
16	FW	(Thailand) Woraphot Somsang	2	0	0	0	0	0	2	0
17	MF	(Thailand) Phattharaphol Khamsuk	2	0	0	0	0	0	2	0
18	MF	(Thailand) Watcharakorn Manoworn	5	0	0	0	0	0	5	0
19	MF	(Thailand) Wachirawut Phudithip	2	1	0	0	0	0	2	1
22	MF	(Thailand) Chaowasit Sapysakunphon	5	0	0	0	0	0	5	0
24	MF	(Thailand) Rattapoom Lonlue	0	0	0	0	0	0	0	0
26	DF	(Thailand) Apisit Khuankwai	3	0	0	0	0	0	3	0
27	FW	(Thailand) Kasitinard Sriphirom	0	0	0	0	0	0	0	0
35	DF	(Thailand) Siripong Kongjaopha	1	0	0	0	0	0	1	0
36	DF	(Thailand) Sitthichok Mool-on	3	0	0	0	0	0	3	0
37	DF	(Thailand) Phubordee Buangam	0	0	0	0	0	0	0	0
39	GK	(Thailand) Nattapong Thongpum	0	0	0	0	0	0	0	0
40	DF	(Japan) Goshi Okubo	0	0	0	0	0	0	0	0
45	GK	(Thailand) Yannasit Sukchareon	0	0	0	0	0	0	0	0
56	FW	(Brazil) Carlos Eduardo dos Santos Lima	5	3	0	0	0	0	5	3
66	FW	(Thailand) Bunlue Thongkliang	0	0	0	0	0	0	0	0
77	FW	(Thailand) Alex Amatavivadhana	0	0	0	0	0	0	0	0
92	FW	(France) Simon Dia	3	0	0	0	0	0	3	0
99	GK	(Thailand) Natthasan Pakkarano	0	0	0	0	0	0	0	0
	FW	(Thailand) Phootran Gingpan	0	0	0	0	0	0	0	0
Players loaned out / left during season

== Overall summary ==
=== Season summary ===
Games played	5 (5 Thai League 2, 2 FA Cup, 1 League Cup)
Games won	2 (2 Thai League 2, 0 FA Cup, 0 League Cup)
Games drawn	0 (0 Thai League 2, 0 FA Cup, 0 League Cup)
Games lost	3 (3 Thai League 2, 0 FA Cup, 0 League Cup)
Goals scored	6 (6 Thai League 2, 0 FA Cup, 0 League Cup)
Goals conceded	9 (9 Thai League 2, 0 FA Cup, 0 League Cup)
Goal difference	-3
Clean sheets	0 (0 Thai League 2, 0 FA Cup, 0 League Cup)
Best result	2-1 (2 games)
Worst result	0-3 vs Lampang F.C. (30 Aug 2024)
Most appearances	
Top scorer	Carlos Eduardo dos Santos Lima (3)
Points	6
