= 2019 Buriram United F.C. season =

Buriram United
2019 season
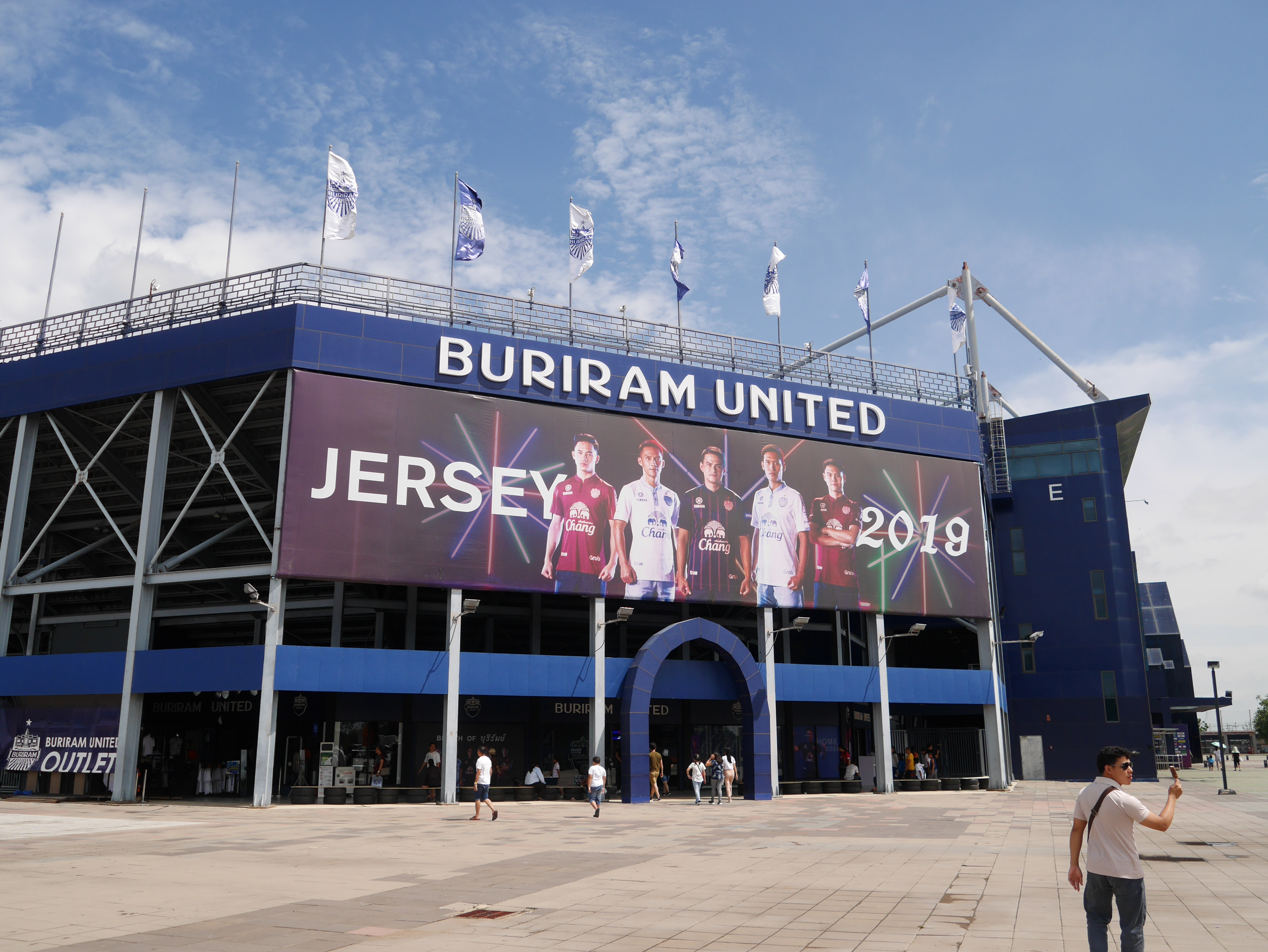
- Chang Arena in 2019
- Chairman: Newin Chidchob
- Head coach: Bozidar Bandovic
- Stadium: Chang Arena
- Thai League: 2nd
- FA Cup: Semi-finals
- League Cup: Runners-up
- Champions Cup: Winners
- AFC Champions League: Group stage
- Top goalscorer: League: Supachok Sarachat (9); All: Supachok Sarachat and Nacer Barazite (12)
- Highest home attendance: 32,538 (vs. Port, 20 October 2019, T1)
- Biggest win: 6–0 (vs. Ratchaburi Mitr Phol, 17 August 2019, T1)
- Biggest defeat: 0–4 (vs. Singha Chiangrai United, 31 July 2019, T1)
Home colours	Away colours	Third colours

The 2019 season is Buriram United's 8th season in the Thai League. The club enters the season as the Thai League defending champions, and will participate in the top level league. They will also participate in two domestic cups (FA and League Cup), Champions Cup and AFC Champions League.

This is the first season in the league that Buriram will face only other 15 instead of 17 teams since the football association reduced the top league teams from 18 to 16. And this is also the first season that Buriram doesn't win any titles of the season (excluding Thailand Champions Cup) since the club's first season, 2010.

== Club information ==
Owner	(Thailand) Newin Chidchob
Ground (capacity and dimensions)	Chang Arena (32,600 / 4,046 m^{2})
Training Ground	Chang Training Ground, Buriram; Buriram United Football Camp, Samut Prakan

Source: Club

== Squad information ==
As of 1 July 2019

Squad No.	Name	Nationality	Position(s)	Date of birth (age)	Transferred from	Since
Goalkeepers
1	Siwarak Tedsungnoen	(Thailand)	GK	20 April 1984 (age 42)	(Thailand) TOT	2010
29	Yotsapon Teangdar	(Thailand)	GK	6 April 1992 (age 34)	Youth academy	2011
Defenders
3	Pansa Hemviboon	(Thailand)	DF	8 July 1990 (age 35)	(Thailand) Khon Kaen United	2016
5	Andrés Túñez	(Spain) (Venezuela)	DF	15 March 1987 (age 39)	(Spain) Celta Vigo	2014
11	Korrakot Wiriyaudomsiri	(Thailand)	DF	19 March 1988 (age 38)	(Thailand) Chonburi	2016
14	Chitipat Tanklang	(Thailand)	DF	11 August 1991 (age 34)	Youth academy	2012
15	Narubadin Weerawatnodom	(Thailand)	DF	12 July 1994 (age 31)	(Thailand) BEC Tero	2015
30	Stephan Palla	(Austria) (Philippines)	DF	15 May 1989 (age 37)	(Austria) SKN St. Pölten	2018
Midfielders
6	Sasalak Haiprakhon	(Thailand)	MF	8 January 1996 (age 30)	(Thailand) Bangkok United	2017
7	Hajime Hosogai	(Japan)	MF	10 June 1986 (age 39)	(Japan) Kashiwa Reysol	2018
8	Suchao Nuchnum	(Thailand)	MF	17 May 1983 (age 43)	(Thailand) TOT	2010
10	Jakkaphan Kaewprom	(Thailand)	MF	24 May 1988 (age 38)	(Thailand) Muangthong United	2011
19	Supachok Sarachat	(Thailand)	MF	22 May 1998 (age 28)	Youth academy	2015
22	Kevin Ingreso	(Philippines) (Germany)	MF	10 February 1993 (age 33)	(Philippines) Ceres–Negros	2019
26	Ratthanakorn Maikami	(Thailand)	MF	1 January 1998 (age 28)	Youth academy	2016
Strikers
9	Supachai Jaided	(Thailand)	FW	1 December 1998 (age 27)	(Thailand) Super Power Samut Prakan	2016
20	Rasmus Jönsson	(Sweden)	FW	27 January 1990 (age 36)	(Sweden) Helsingborgs IF	2019
39	Nacer Barazite	(Netherlands)	FW	27 May 1990 (age 36)	(United Arab Emirates) Al Jazira	2019

== Transfers ==
Transfer window	Date
1st leg (Winter)	26 November 2018 – 19 February 2019
2nd leg (Summer)	24 June 2019 – 19 July 2019

=== In ===
No.	Pos	Player	From	Type	Date	Source
1st leg – Winter transfer
24	MF	(Cambodia) Chrerng Polroth	(Cambodia) Army	Loan	9 August 2018	
–	MF	(Philippines) (England) Luke Woodland	(Thailand) Suphanburi F.C.	Loan Return	1 December 2018	
–	MF	(South Korea) Go Seul-ki	(South Korea) Incheon United FC	Loan Return	17 December 2018	
7	MF	(Japan) Hajime Hosogai	(Japan) Kashiwa Reysol	Free	6 December 2018	
25	FW	(Mali) Modibo Maïga	(United Arab Emirates) Ajman Club	Free	6 January 2019	
21	MF	(Vietnam) Lương Xuân Trường	(Vietnam) Hoàng Anh Gia Lai F.C.	Season loan	10 February 2019	
2nd Leg – Summer transfer
22	MF	(Philippines) Kevin Ingreso	(Philippines) Ceres–Negros	Transfer	19 June 2019	
39	FW	(Netherlands) Nacer Barazite	(United Arab Emirates) Al Jazira	Transfer	26 June 2019	
20	FW	(Sweden) Rasmus Jönsson	(Sweden) Helsingborgs IF	Transfer	2 July 2019	

Note 1: Go Seul-ki returned from loan before heading to Port FC for another loan.

=== Out ===
No.	Pos	Player	To	Type	Date	Source
1st Leg – Winter transfer
–	MF	(Thailand) Anon Amornlerdsak	(Thailand) Bangkok United	Transfer	24 October 2018	
–	MF	(South Korea) Go Seul-ki	(Thailand) Port F.C.	Season loan	17 December 2018	
–	MF	(South Korea) Yoo Jun-soo	(South Korea) Pohang Steelers	Transfer	27 December 2018	
–	FW	(Brazil) Diogo	(Malaysia) Johor Darul Ta'zim	Transfer	January 2019	
–	DF	(Thailand) Nattapon Malapun	(Thailand) PT Prachuap F.C.	Season loan	January 2019	
–	DF	(Thailand) Peerawat Akkatam	(Thailand) PT Prachuap F.C.	Season loan	January 2019	
–	MF	(Thailand) Chitpanya Tisud	(Thailand) PT Prachuap F.C.	Season loan	January 2019	
–	MF	(Thailand) Apichart Denman	(Thailand) PT Prachuap F.C.	Season loan	January 2019	
–	GK	(Thailand) Kwanchai Suklom	(Thailand) PT Prachuap F.C.	Season loan	January 2019	
–	DF	(Australia) Chris Herd	(India) Chennaiyin FC	Transfer	January 2019	
2nd Leg – Summer transfer
25	FW	(Mali) Modibo Maïga	Free agent	Released	10 April 2019	
88	MF	(Thailand) Watcharakorn Manoworn	(Thailand) Khon Kaen	Loan	19 June 2019	
21	MF	(Vietnam) Lương Xuân Trường	(Vietnam) Hoang Anh Gia Lai	Loan return	26 June 2019	
77	FW	(Brazil) Pedro Júnior	Free agent	Released	26 June 2019	
20	FW	(Philippines) Javier Patiño	(Thailand) Ratchaburi Mitr Phol	Loan	1 July 2019	

== Friendly matches ==
Win Draw Loss

18 November 2018 Friendly	Buriram United Original Gangsters (Thailand)	1–1	(Germany) Borussia Dortmund Legends	Buriram, Thailand
--:-- UTC+7		Report		Stadium: Chang Arena

22 December 2018 Friendly	Buriram United (Thailand)	3-0	(Thailand) Pattani F.C.	Rainbow Stadium
--:-- UTC+7		Report

5 January 2019 Friendly	Buriram United (Thailand)	1-0	(Thailand) Khonkaen FC	Ban Phai School Course
--:-- UTC+7		Report

9 January 2019 Friendly	Buriram United (Thailand)	4-0	(Thailand) Satun United F.C.	Ban Phai School Course
--:-- UTC+7		Report

19 January 2019 Friendly	Buriram United (Thailand)	2-0	(Malaysia) Kedah FA	Krabi
				Stadium: Krabi Provincial Stadium

24 January 2019 5	Buriram United (Thailand)	1-4	(Cambodia) Phnom Penh Crown FC	Buriram
			Jhonatan Sant'anna <be> Darlan Martins <be> Yeu Muslim <be> Darlan Martins	Stadium: Khao Kradong Stadium

26 January 2019 6	Buriram United (Thailand)	1-0	(Thailand) Lampang FC

30 January 2019 7	Buriram United (Thailand)	3-0	(Thailand) Angthong F.C.

== Competitions ==
=== Overview ===
Competition	First match	Last match	Starting round	Final position	Record							
Competition	First match	Last match	Starting round	Final position	Pld	W	D	L	GF	GA	GD	Win %
Thai League	23 February 2019	26 October 2019	Matchday 1	Runners-up	30	16	10	4	51	25	+26	53.33
FA Cup	1 May 2019	18 September 2019	First Round	Semi-finals	5	3	1	1	15	6	+9	60.00
League Cup	15 May 2019	28 September 2019	First Round	Runners-up	5	4	1	0	10	3	+7	80.00
Champions Cup	2 February 2018		Final	Winners	1	1	0	0	3	1	+2	100.00
Champions League	6 March 2019	21 May 2019	Group stage	Group stage	6	1	1	4	3	10	−7	16.67
Total					47	25	13	9	82	45	+37	53.19

Last updated: 26 October 2019
Source: Competitions

=== Champions Cup ===
2 February 2018 Final	Buriram United	3–1	Chiangrai United	Din Daeng, Bangkok
19:00 UTC+7	Supachai; Maïga	Report	Brinner	Stadium: Army Stadium

=== Thai League ===
==== League table ====
Pos	Team	Pld	W	D	L	GF	GA	GD	Pts	Qualification or relegation
1	Chiangrai United (C, Q)	30	16	10	4	53	28	+25	58 (Note: Chiangrai United finished ahead of Buriram United on head-to-head points: Buriram United 0–0 Chiangrai United, Chiangrai United 4–0 Buriram United.)	Qualification for AFC Champions League group stage
2	Buriram United (Q)	30	16	10	4	51	25	+26	58	Qualification for AFC Champions League preliminary round 2 (Note: Port qualified for the AFC Champions League preliminary round 2 as 2019 Thai FA Cup winners.)
3	Port (Q)	30	15	8	7	55	36	+19	53	Qualification for AFC Champions League preliminary round 2
4	Bangkok United	30	13	11	6	55	32	+23	50	
5	Muangthong United	30	14	4	12	45	42	+3	46	

Source: Thai League
Rules for classification: 1) Points; 2) Head-to-head points; 3) Head-to-head goals difference; 4) Head-to-head goals scored; 5) Overall goals difference; 6) Overall goals scored; 7) Fair play points; 8) Play-off without extra time;).
(C) Champions; (Q) Qualified for the phase indicated

==== Results summary ====
Overall								Home						Away					
Pld	W	D	L	GF	GA	GD	Pts	W	D	L	GF	GA	GD	W	D	L	GF	GA	GD
30	16	10	4	51	25	+26	58	9	6	0	32	8	+24	7	4	4	19	17	+2

==== Results by matchday ====
Matchday	1	2	3	4	5	6	7	8	9	10	11	12	13	14	15	16	17	18	19	20	21	22	23	24	25	26	27	28	29	30
Ground	H	A	H	A	H	H	H	A	H	H	A	A	H	A	H	A	H	A	H	A	A	A	A	H	H	A	H	A	H	A
Result	D	D	W	W	W	D	D	W	W	W	L	D	W	W	W	L	D	D	D	W	L	W	W	W	D	L	W	W	W	D
Position	5	8	6	2	1	1	2	2	2	2	4	2	2	1	1	1	1	1	1	1	2	1	1	1	1	2	1	1	1	2

Updated to match(es) played on 26 October 2019. Source: Thai League results
A = Away; H = Home; W = Win; D = Draw; L = Loss

==== Matches ====
23 February 2019 1	Buriram United	2–2	Chonburi	Buriram
19:00 UTC+7	Supachok 65', 67'; Korrakot (yellow card) 71'	Report (1); Report (2)	Nattapong (yellow card) 35' , (red card) 62'; Kritsada (yellow card) 47'; Kroekrit (yellow card) 52' , (goal) 76'; Worachit 57'; Saharat (yellow card) 68'; Lukian (yellow card) 71' , (red card) 89'	Stadium: Chang Arena; Attendance: 15,491; Referee: Pairoj Bunkamnoed; Man of the Match: Supachok Sarachat

1 March 2019 2	Suphanburi	0–0	Buriram United	Suphan Buri
20:00 UTC+7	Sung-hwan (yellow card) 45+1'	Report (1); Report (2)	Palla (yellow card) 35'; Supachok (yellow card) 56'; Ratthanakorn (yellow card) 60'	Stadium: Suphan Buri Provincial Stadium; Attendance: 13,019; Referee: Wiwat Champa-aon

10 March 2019 3	Buriram United	2–0	PT Prachuap	Buriram
18:00 UTC+7	Palla (yellow card) 40'; Maïga 74'; Supachok 82'	Report (1); Report (2)	Ratchapol (yellow card) 80'; Filiposyan (yellow card) 84'	Stadium: Chang Arena; Attendance: 10,625 คน; Referee: Torpong Somsing; Man of the Match: Sasalak Haiprakhon

17 March 2019 4	True Bangkok United	0–1	Buriram United	Pathum Thani (Khlong Luang)
19:00 UTC+7	Pokklaw (yellow card) 43'; Teeratep (yellow card) 60'; Tristan (yellow card) 85'	Report (1); Report (2)	Pedro (yellow card) 22' , (goal) 84'; Supachok (yellow card) 28'	Stadium: True Stadium; Attendance: 15,155; Referee: Wiwat Champa-aon; Man of the Match: Pedro Júnior

30 March 2019 5	Buriram United	3–2	Samut Prakan City	Buriram
19:00 UTC+7	Korrakot (yellow card) 34' , (goal) 42'; Pedro 65' (pen.), 70'; Suchao (yellow card) 90+3'	Report (1); Report (2)	Nopphon (yellow card) 60'; Kyaw 80'; Picha 83'	Stadium: Chang Arena; Attendance: 10,634; Referee: Thitichai Nuanchan; Man of the Match: Pedro Júnior

3 April 2019 6	Buriram United	0–0	Singha Chiangrai United	Buriram
19:00 UTC+7	Narubadin (yellow card) 77'	Report	Yong-rae (yellow card) 11' , (red card) 76'; Tanasak (yellow card) 24'; Sarawut Inpaen (yellow card) 73'	Stadium: Chang Arena; Attendance: 9,920; Referee: Sivakorn Pu-udom

19 April 2019 7	Buriram United	1–1	Trat	Buriram
20:00 UTC+7	Hosogai (yellow card) 42'; Supachai 73'; Sasalak (yellow card) 83'; Pansa (yellow card) 90+4'	Report	Chenrop (yellow card) 44'; Doumbouya (yellow card) 52' , (goal) 59'; Tatchanon (yellow card) 64'; Supoj (yellow card) 78'; Pichit (yellow card) 87'	Stadium: Chang Arena; Attendance: 10,977; Referee: Warinthorn Satsadee; Man of the Match: Jakkaphan Kaewprom

28 April 2019 8	Ratchaburi Mitr Phol	1–2	Buriram United	Ratchaburi
18:00 UTC+7	Langil 7'	Report	Jirawat Thongsaengphrao 60' (o.g.); Pedro Júnior 88' (pen.)	Stadium: Mitr Phol Stadium; Attendance: 8,415; Referee: Sarayut Chakngoen; Man of the Match: Hajime Hosogai

11 May 2019 9	Buriram United	2–0	Nakhon Ratchasima Mazda	Buriram
17:45 UTC+7	Xuân Trường; Suphanat	Report		Stadium: Chang Arena; Man of the Match: Pedro Júnior

26 May 2019 10	Buriram United	1–0	SCG Muangthong United	Buriram
19:00 UTC+7	Hosogai (yellow card) 58'; Sasalak 78'	Report	Suphanan (yellow card) 47'; Adisorn (yellow card) 63'	Stadium: Chang Arena; Attendance: 27,009; Referee: Chairerk Ngamsom; Man of the Match: Sasalak Haiprakhon

29 May 2019 11	Chainat Hornbill	2–1	Buriram United	Chai Nat
18:00 UTC+7	Jaturapat Sattham; Ricardo Santos	Report	Túñez	Stadium: Khao Plong Stadium

1 June 2019 12	Sukhothai	1–1	Buriram United	Sukhothai
18:00 UTC+7	Baggio 13'	Report	Supachai 86'	Stadium: Thalay Luang Stadium

12 June 2019 13	Buriram United	5–0	PTT Rayong	Buriram
18:00 UTC+7	Sasalak 29'; Pedro Júnior 47'; Túñez 56', 60'; Suphanat 67'	Report		Stadium: Chang Arena; Referee: Ketdamrong Khemthong

16 June 2019 14	Port	1–3	Buriram United	Bangkok (Khlong Toei)
19:00 UTC+7	Sergio Suárez 48'		Túñez 3' (pen.); Pedro Júnior 55'; Chitipat 63'	Stadium: PAT Stadium; Referee: Chairerk Ngamsom

22 June 2019 15	Buriram United	4–0	Chiangmai	Buriram
20:00 UTC+7	Sasalak 39'; Supachok 45+3'; Patiño 86'; Suphanat 90+3'	Report		Stadium: Chang Arena

30 June 2019 16	Chonburi	1–0	Buriram United	Chonburi
19:00 UTC+7	Caion 80'	Report		Stadium: Chonburi Stadium

7 July 2019 17	Buriram United	0–0	Suphanburi	Buriram
19:00 UTC+7				Stadium: Chang Arena; Man of the Match: Sasalak Haiprakhon

14 July 2019 18	PT Prachuap	0–0	Buriram United	Prachuap Khiri Khan
18:00 UTC+7				Stadium: Sam Ao Stadium

21 July 2019 19	Buriram United	1–1	True Bangkok United	Buriram
18:00 UTC+7	Barazite 31'	Report	Everton 45'	Stadium: Chang Arena; Referee: Nathee Choosuwan; Man of the Match: Supachok Sarachat

27 July 2019 20	Samut Prakan City	1–4	Buriram United	Samut Prakan (Bang Phli)
19:00 UTC+7	Ibson Melo 47'	report	Suphanat 20', 45+2'; Supachok 71'; Barazite 78'	Stadium: Samut Prakarn Stadium

31 July 2019 21	Singha Chiangrai United	4–0	Buriram United	Chiang Rai
19:00 UTC+7	Brinner 21'; Bill 36', 62'; Ekanit 69'	report		Stadium: Singha Stadium

4 August 2019 22	PTT Rayong	0–1	Buriram United	Rayong
19:00 UTC+7		Report	Suphanat 53'	Stadium: PTT Stadium

11 August 2019 23	Trat	0–1	Buriram United	Trat
19:35 UTC+7		Report	Barazite 84'	Stadium: Trat Province Stadium; Man of the Match: Supachok Sarachat

17 August 2019 24	Buriram United	6–0	Ratchaburi Mitr Phol	Buriram
18:00 UTC+7	Suphanat 25'; Túñez 42' (pen.); Ratthanakorn 52'; Supachok 55'; Narubadin 90+2'; Barazite 90+4'	Report		Stadium: Chang Arena; Man of the Match: Andrés Túñez

24 August 2019 25	Buriram United	1–1	Sukhothai	Buriram
17:45 UTC+7	Túñez 90+4' (pen.)	Report	Ramsay 22'	Stadium: Chang Arena

14 September 2019 26	SCG Muangthong United	3–1	Buriram United	Nonthaburi (Pak Kret)
19:00 UTC+7	Ban-suk 5'; Derley 11'; Heberty 48'	Report	Suphanat 90+4'	Stadium: SCG Stadium; Referee: Mongkolchai Phetsri

22 September 2019 27	Buriram United	1–0	Chainat Hornbill	Buriram
18:00 UTC+7	Supachok 78'	Report		Stadium: Chang Arena; Man of the Match: Supachok Sarachat

2 October 2019 28	Nakhon Ratchasima Mazda	2–3	Buriram United	Nakhon Ratchasima
19:00 UTC+7	Yayar Kunath 32'; Kitsada 90+4'	Report	Jönsson 20'; Ratthanakorn 25'; Supachok 79'	Stadium: 80th Birthday Stadium

20 October 2019 29	Buriram United	3–1	Port	Buriram
18:00 UTC+7	Barazite 34'; Supachok 36'; Ingreso 70'	Report	S. Suárez 20'	Stadium: Chang Arena; Attendance: 32,538

26 October 2019 30	Chiangmai	1–1	Buriram United	Chiang Mai (Mae Rim)
18:00 UTC+7	Caíque 87'	Report	Barazite 53'	Stadium: 700th Anniversary Stadium

=== FA Cup ===
1 May 2019 First round	Buriram United	3–1	PTT Rayong	Buriram
18:00 UTC+7	Korrakot 64'; Sasalak 73'; Pedro Júnior 90'	Report	Saharat 34'	Stadium: Chang Arena

19 June 2019 Second round	Buriram United	4–1	Lampang	Buriram
18:00 UTC+7	Pedro Júnior 33'; Korrakot 56'; Supachai 65'; Watcharakorn 90+3'	Report	Melvin de Leeuw 54'	Stadium: Chang Arena

17 July 2019 Third round	Buriram United	5–0	Rayong	Buriram
18:00 UTC+7	Barazite 37', 45+2', 49'; Sasalak 58'; Supachok 61'	Report		Stadium: Chang Arena

7 August 2019 Quarter-finals	Trat	2–2 (a.e.t.) (4–5 p)	Buriram United	Trat
18:00 UTC+7	Diouf 44'; Wongsakorn 51'	Report	Barazite 72'; Túñez 85'	Stadium: Trat Province Stadium

18 September 2019 Semi-finals	Ratchaburi Mitr Phol	2–1	Buriram United	Bangkok (Min Buri)
19:00 UTC+7	Nazari 45+1'; Boli 73'	Report	Pansa 59'	Stadium: 72nd Anniversary Stadium

=== League Cup ===
15 May 2019 First round	Rayong	1–4 (a.e.t.)	Buriram United	Rayong
19:00 UTC+7	Thiago Jesus 50'	Report	Wasusiwakit Phusirit 55' (o.g.); Supachok 108'; Pedro Júnior 111', 116'	Stadium: Rayong Province Stadium

3 July 2019 Second round	JL Chiangmai United	1–2 (a.e.t.)	Buriram United	Mae Rim, Chiang Mai
18:00 UTC+7	Sirisuk Faidong 83'	Report	Barazite 28'; Sasalak 120'	Stadium: 700th Anniversary Stadium

24 July 2019 Quarter-finals	True Bangkok United	0–1 (a.e.t.)	Buriram United	Khlong Luang, Pathum Thani
19:00 UTC+7			Barazite 113'	Stadium: True Stadium

14 August 2019 Semi-finals	Buriram United	2–0	Nongbua Pitchaya	Bangkok (Min Buri)
19:00 UTC+7	Apiwat 14'; Korrakot 48'	Report		Stadium: 72nd Anniversary Stadium

28 September 2019 Final	Buriram United	1–1 (a.e.t.) (7–8 p)	PT Prachuap	Nonthaburi (Pak Kret)
19:00 UTC+7	Supachai 74'		Maurinho 47'	Stadium: SCG Stadium; Attendance: 11,218; Referee: Mongkolchai Phetsri
	Penalties
	Túñez (penalty scored); Ratthanakorn (penalty scored); Suphanat (penalty missed); Supachai (penalty scored); Suchao (penalty scored); Siwarak (penalty scored); Sasalak (penalty scored); Hosogai (penalty scored); Korrakot (penalty missed)		(penalty missed) Sompob; (penalty scored) Adun; (penalty scored) Ratchapol; (penalty scored) Filiposyan; (penalty scored) Phuritad; (penalty scored) Weerawut; (penalty scored) Sakunchai; (penalty scored) Amorn; (penalty scored) Seeket

=== AFC Champions League ===
==== Group stage ====
Pos	Team	Pld	W	D	L	GF	GA	GD	Pts	Qualification	JEO	URA	BJG	BUR
1	(South Korea) Jeonbuk Hyundai Motors	6	4	1	1	7	3	+4	13	Advance to knockout stage	—	2–1	3–1	0–0
2	(Japan) Urawa Red Diamonds	6	3	1	2	9	4	+5	10	Advance to knockout stage	0–1	—	3–0	3–0
3	(China) Beijing FC	6	2	1	3	6	8	−2	7		0–1	0–0	—	2–0
4	(Thailand) Buriram United	6	1	1	4	3	10	−7	4		1–0	1–2	1–3	—

Source: AFC
Rules for classification: Group stage tiebreakers

6 March 2019 1	Urawa Red Diamonds (Japan)	3–0	(Thailand) Buriram United	Saitama, Japan
19:30 UTC+9	Makino 50'; Hashioka 75', 88'	Live Report; Stats Report		Stadium: Saitama Stadium 2002; Referee: Yaqoob Abdul Baki (Oman)

13 March 2019 2	Buriram United (Thailand)	1–0	(South Korea) Jeonbuk Hyundai Motors	Buriram, Thailand
18:00 UTC+7	Sarachat 50'	Live Report; Stats Report		Stadium: Chang Arena; Referee: Ilgiz Tantashev (Uzbekistan)

9 April 2019 3	Buriram United (Thailand)	1–3	(China) Beijing Guoan	Buriram, Thailand
18:00 UTC+7	Mueanta 80'	Live Report; Stats Report	Bakambu 2', 29', 54'	Stadium: Buriram Stadium

24 April 2019 4	Beijing Guoan (China)	2–0	(Thailand) Buriram United	Beijing, China
20:00 UTC+8	Augusto 55' (pen.); Ba Dun 76'	Live Report; Stats Report		Stadium: Workers' Stadium; Attendance: 25,720; Referee: Khamis Al-Kuwari (Qatar)

7 May 2019 5	Buriram United (Thailand)	1–2	(Japan) Urawa Red Diamonds	Buriram, Thailand
18:00 UTC+7	Pedro Júnior 13'	Live Report; Stats Report	Koroki 3'; Muto 23'	Stadium: Buriram Stadium; Referee: Ilgiz Tantashev (Uzbekistan)

21 May 2019 6	Jeonbuk Hyundai Motors (South Korea)	0–0	(Thailand) Buriram United	Jeonju, South Korea
19:00 UTC+9		Live Report; Stats Report		Stadium: Jeonju World Cup Stadium; Attendance: 7,957; Referee: Abdulrahman Al-Jassim (Qatar)

== Statistics ==
=== Appearances ===
Players with no appearances are not included in the list. The italic text means the player left the club during the season.
As of match played 26 October 2019

Sortable table
No.	Pos.	Nat.	Name	Thai League		FA Cup		League Cup		Champions Cup		ACL		Total	
No.	Pos.	Nat.	Name	Apps	Starts	Apps	Starts	Apps	Starts	Apps	Starts	Apps	Starts	Apps	Starts
1	GK	(Thailand)	Siwarak Tedsungnoen	30	30	4	4	3	3	1	1	6	6	44	44
3	DF	(Thailand)	Pansa Hemviboon	23	23	2	2	4	3	1	1	6	6	36	35
5	DF	(Venezuela)	Andrés Túñez	27	27	4	4	4	4	1	1	6	6	42	42
6	DF	(Thailand)	Sasalak Haiprakhon	30	27	5	5	5	5	1	1	6	6	47	44
7	MF	(Japan)	Hajime Hosogai	27	24	5	5	5	4	0	0	0	0	37	33
8	MF	(Thailand)	Suchao Nuchnum	6	2	2	1	2	1	1	1	4	3	15	8
9	FW	(Thailand)	Supachai Jaided	28	19	5	3	4	4	1	1	6	6	44	33
10	MF	(Thailand)	Jakkaphan Kaewprom	9	3	1	0	2	1	1	0	2	1	15	5
11	DF	(Thailand)	Korrakot Wiriyaudomsiri	10	7	3	3	5	5	1	1	3	3	22	19
14	DF	(Thailand)	Chitipat Tanklang	23	22	4	4	1	1	0	0	5	5	33	32
15	DF	(Thailand)	Narubadin Weerawatnodom	28	26	4	1	5	1	0	0	6	6	43	34
18	DF	(Thailand)	Apiwat Ngaolamhin	12	9	3	3	3	3	0	0	2	0	20	15
19	MF	(Thailand)	Supachok Sarachat	29	23	5	3	4	2	1	1	6	6	45	35
20	FW	(Philippines)	Javier Patiño	9	3	1	1	0	0	1	0	0	0	11	4
20	FW	(Sweden)	Rasmus Jönsson	13	7	3	3	3	3	0	0	0	0	19	13
21	MF	(Vietnam)	Xuân Trường	6	4	0	0	1	0	0	0	3	0	10	4
22	MF	(Philippines)	Kevin Ingreso	10	8	0	0	0	0	0	0	0	0	10	8
25	FW	(Mali)	Modibo Maïga	3	1	0	0	0	0	1	1	2	0	6	3
26	MF	(Thailand)	Ratthanakorn Maikami	27	22	4	2	4	3	1	1	6	6	42	34
29	GK	(Thailand)	Yotsapon Teangdar	0	0	1	1	2	2	0	0	0	0	3	3
30	DF	(Philippines)	Stephan Palla	11	9	3	3	3	2	1	1	0	0	18	15
39	FW	(Netherlands)	Nacer Barazite	13	12	3	1	3	2	0	0	0	0	19	15
54	FW	(Thailand)	Suphanat Mueanta	23	7	4	2	5	5	1	0	5	0	38	14
62	MF	(Thailand)	Airfan Doloh	3	0	2	2	2	1	0	0	1	1	8	4
77	FW	(Brazil)	Pedro Júnior	15	14	2	2	1	0	0	0	5	5	23	21
88	MF	(Thailand)	Watcharakorn Manoworn	0	0	1	0	0	0	0	0	0	0	1	0

=== Goalscorers ===
Includes all competitive matches. The list is sorted by shirt number when total goals are equal. The italic text means the player left the club during the season.
As of match played 26 October 2019

No.	Pos.	Player	Thai League	FA Cup	League Cup	Champions Cup	ACL	TOTAL
1	19	(Thailand) Supachok Sarachat	9	1	1	0	1	12
1	39	(Netherlands) Nacer Barazite	6	4	2	0	0	12
3	77	(Brazil) Pedro Júnior	6	2	2	0	1	11
4	54	(Thailand) Suphanat Mueanta	8	0	0	0	1	9
5	5	(Venezuela) Andrés Túñez	6	1	0	0	0	7
6	6	(Thailand) Sasalak Haiprakhon	3	2	1	0	0	6
6	9	(Thailand) Supachai Jaided	2	1	1	2	0	6
8	11	(Thailand) Korrakot Wiriyaudomsiri	1	2	1	0	0	4
9	25	(Mali) Modibo Maïga	1	0	0	1	0	2
9	26	(Thailand) Ratthanakorn Maikami	2	0	0	0	0	2
11	3	(Thailand) Pansa Hemviboon	0	1	0	0	0	1
11	14	(Thailand) Chitipat Tanklang	1	0	0	0	0	1
11	15	(Thailand) Narubadin Weerawatnodom	1	0	0	0	0	1
11	18	(Thailand) Apiwat Ngaolamhin	0	0	1	0	0	1
11	20	(Philippines) Javier Patiño	1	0	0	0	0	1
11	20	(Sweden) Rasmus Jönsson	1	0	0	0	0	1
11	21	(Vietnam) Lương Xuân Trường	1	0	0	0	0	1
11	22	(Philippines) Kevin Ingreso	1	0	0	0	0	1
11	88	(Thailand) Watcharakorn Manoworn	0	1	0	0	0	1
Own Goals			1	0	1	0	0	2
Totals			51	15	10	3	3	82

=== Clean sheets ===
As of match played 26 October 2019

No.	Player	Thai League	FA Cup	League Cup	Champions Cup	ACL	Total
1	(Thailand) Siwarak Tedsungnoen	14	1	2	0	2	19
29	(Thailand) Yotsapon Teangdar	0	0	0	0	0	0
Total		14	1	2	0	2	19
