= Thonburirom Park =

Park in Bangkok, Thailand

Coordinates: 13°39′07″N 100°29′28″E

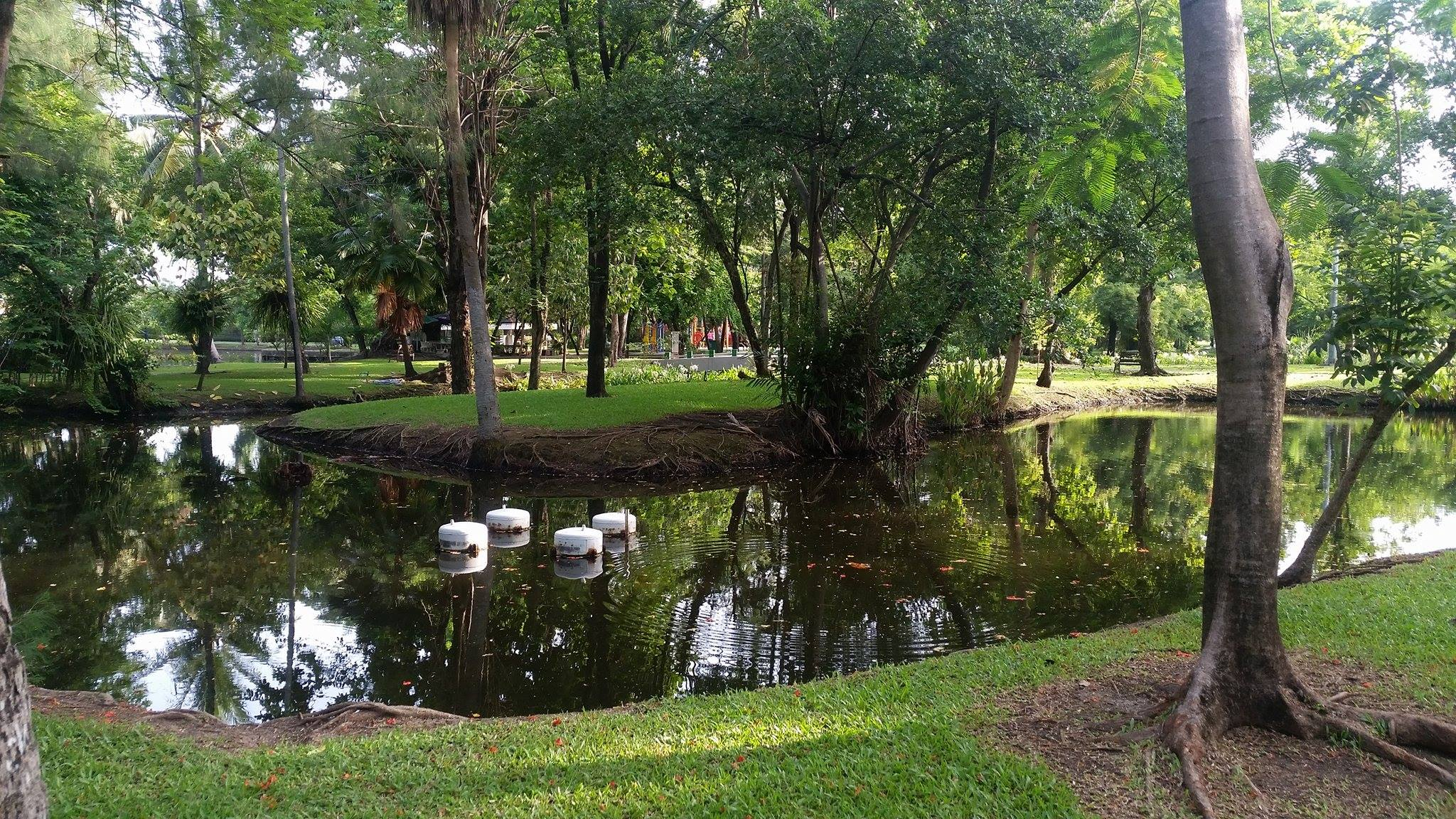
Thonburirom Park

Thonburirom Park (Thai: สวนธนบุรีรมย์, RTGS: Suan Thon Buri Rom, pronounced [sǔa̯n tʰōn bū.rīː rōm]), widely known as Suan Thon (สวนธน), is the first public park in Thonburi, Bangkok, Thailand. The park offers rare open public space, trees, and playgrounds. It has a total land area of 63 rai (ไร่) and is located along Puttabucha Road, Bang Mod, Thung Kru district. The park is situated near the district's public library and behind King Mongkut’s University of Technology Thonburi (KMUTT). It is open daily 05:00–21:00.

== History ==
Once an orchard, Thonburirom Park was developed in 1968 in response to the policy set by Phraya Mahaisawan (Thai: พระยามไหสวรรย์), the governor of Thonburi province (now Thonburi). Originally, this piece of land was managed by the Crown Property Bureau (CPB), a quasi-government agency overseeing the properties of the King of Thailand.

== Identity ==
Due to heavy pollution and lack of green space in Thung Khru district, Thonburirom Park is developed consisting of zones for perennial plants, herbs, flowers, wells and sports. Moreover, there are many garden trees planted around the park and rare plants such as Kong-Ka-Dueat (Arfeuillea arborescens Pierre; Thai: คงคาเดือด). Furthermore, there are basic traffic signs for intended to teach children to follow the rules. In the future, this park aims to be developed as a “Herb Garden in a Tropical City”. The bus which pass the park is No.75.

== Activities ==
In the park, some fitness facilities are available for park-goers to use freely. In the morning, people gather to do aerobics, yoga and Tai Chi. Not only that, it has a lane for jogging. There is also a vast playground for children. The park offers Thai-themed pavilions for relaxation.
