= Siripong =

Siripong or Siripongs is a Thai name. People with the name include:

== Given name ==
- Siripong Kongjaopha (born 1997), Thai professional footballer
- Siripong Siripool (born 1965), Thai badminton player

== Surname ==
- Jaturun Siripongs (1951–1999), Thai convicted criminal executed in California
