= Thongsuk Sampahungsith =

Thai football coach (born 1953)

Personal information
- Full name: Thongsuk Sampahungsith
- Date of birth: 3 April 1953 (age 73)
- Place of birth: Bangkok, Thailand

Managerial career
- Years: Team
- 1993–2000: Thai Farmer Bank (assistant)
- 2007: Thailand U-23
- 2009: PEA
- 2010–2012: Bangkok
- 2014: Krabi
- 2016: Super Power Samut Prakan (assistant)
- 2017–: Police Tero (technical director)
Medal record
Thailand under-23
Sea Games
Gold medal – first place	Sea Games 2007	Football
- ‡ National team caps and goals as of September 15, 2012

Thongsuk Sampahungsith is a Thai football coach.

== Honours ==
International

- Sea Games 2007 Gold medal Thailand U 23

Bangkok F.C.

- Regional League Bangkok Area Division; Winners (1) : 2010
