= Bangkok F.C. =

Association football club in Thailand

Bangkok บางกอก เอฟซี
- Full name: Bangkok Football Club (สโมสรฟุตบอลบางกอก เอฟซี)
- Nickname: The Fire Bulls (กระทิงเพลิง)
- Short name: BKKFC
- Founded: 1999; 27 years ago as Bangkok Bravo A.F.C.
- Ground: Chalerm Phrakiat Bang Mod Stadium; Thung Khru, Bangkok, Thailand
- Capacity: 8,000
- Chairman: Porntat Amatavivadhana
- Head Coach: Kissakorn Krasaingoen
- League: Thai League 3
- 2025–26: Thai League 2, 18th of 18 (Relegated)
- Website: fc-bangkok.com
Home colours	Away colours

Bangkok Football Club (Thai: สโมสรฟุตบอลบางกอก), formerly known as Bangkok Bravo A.F.C., is a professional Thai football club from Bangkok, the capital of Thailand, currently playing in the Thai League 3.

== History ==
Bangkok F.C. was founded by Nataphol Teepsuwan in 1999 as Bangkok Bravo A.F.C. or, in its entirety, Krung Thep Maha Nakhon Amon Rattanakosin Mahinthara Ayutthaya Mahadilok Phop Noppharat Ratchathani Burirom Udomratchaniwet Mahasathan Amon Phiman Awatan Sathit Sakkathattiya Witsanukamprasit Bravo A.F.C., using the full ceremonial name of Bangkok. They played in the Thai Division 1 League until 2007.

In 2010, the newly renamed Bangkok F.C. under former national team coach Thongsuk Sampahungsith won the Division 2 League Bangkok region, qualifying for the national play-offs. The Bulls started poorly but regained their form to finish fourth, which earned them an opportunity to earn promotion to the first division through another play-off round. There, Bangkok easily cruised past a hapless side from Narathiwat 11–2 on aggregate.

2011, Bangkok's first season back in Division 1, ended in an 11th-place finish, followed by 10th place the following season. Disappointed with such performances, Thongsuk resigned and was succeeded by Kiatisuk Senamuang, who led Bangkok to fourth in 2013. Kiatisuk would eventually go on to lead a golden generation of the Thai national team.

In 2022, Bangkok competed in the Thai League 3 Bangkok region, their 16th season in Thai professional football. They became runners-up of their region, advancing to the national play-offs. In addition, they suffered two first-round eliminations in cup competitions: 4–5 on penalties by Wat Bot City in the 2022–23 Thai FA Cup and 1–4 to the Lamphun Warriors in the 2022–23 Thai League Cup.

== Stadium and locations ==
Coordinates	Location	Stadium	Capacity	Year
13°48′07″N 100°47′27″E	Min Buri, Bangkok	72nd Anniversary Stadium (Min Buri)	10,000	2007
13°38′48″N 100°29′34″E	Thung Khru, Bangkok	72nd Anniversary Stadium (Bang Mod)	8,000	2008
13°48′07″N 100°47′27″E	Min Buri, Bangkok	72nd Anniversary Stadium (Min Buri)	10,000	2009
13°38′48″N 100°29′34″E	Thung Khru, Bangkok	72nd Anniversary Stadium (Bang Mod)	8,000	2010–2017
	Nonthaburi	Muangthong Training Pitch	1,500	2018
13°55′05″N 100°32′51″E	Muang Thong Thani, Nonthaburi	SCG Stadium	15,000	2019
13°38′48″N 100°29′34″E	Khlong Luang, Pathum Thani	Bangkok University Stadium	1,000	2020
13°38′48″N 100°29′34″E	Thung Khru, Bangkok	72nd Anniversary Stadium (Bang Mod)	8,000	2021–

== Season-by-season record ==
Season	League									FA Cup	League Cup	T3 Cup	Top scorer	
Season	Division	P	W	D	L	F	A	Pts	Pos	FA Cup	League Cup	T3 Cup	Name	Goals
2007	DIV 1	22	5	8	9	27	35	23	11th					
2008	DIV 2	20	2	3	15	16	47	9	11th					
2009	DIV 2 Bangkok	18	5	7	6	18	25	22	6th					
2010	DIV 2 Bangkok	24	14	6	4	49	18	48	1st					
2011	DIV 1	34	13	3	18	56	63	42	11th				(Ghana) Samuel Kwaku	14
2012	DIV 1	34	11	9	14	62	55	42	10th				(England) Lee Tuck	23
2013	DIV 1	34	18	8	8	69	54	62	4th	QF			(England) Lee Tuck	23
2014	DIV 1	34	14	15	5	53	37	57	4th	QF			(Brazil) Valci Júnior	16
2015	DIV 1	38	14	7	17	44	49	49	13th	R2	R1		(Montenegro) Radomir Đalović	15
2016	DIV 1	26	4	11	11	26	41	23	14th	R1	R1		(Brazil) Douglas	9
2017	T2	32	8	5	19	47	64	29	17th	R1	QRP		(Brazil) João Paulo	23
2018	T3 Upper	26	10	7	9	35	36	37	5th	R1	QRP		(Thailand) Poramet Arjvirai	7
2019	T3 Upper	24	11	4	9	47	35	37	5th	QR1	QR2		(Ivory Coast) Ibrahim Abou Dicko	15
2020–21	T3 Bangkok	20	13	5	2	40	18	44	3rd	R1	QR1		(Thailand) Bunlue Thongkliang	7
2021–22	T3 Bangkok	26	15	8	3	55	19	53	2nd	R2	QR2		(Brazil) Caíque Freitas Ribeiro	18
2022–23	T3 Bangkok	26	15	8	3	48	29	53	2nd	R1	R1		(Thailand) Bunlue Thongkliang	11
2023–24	T3 Bangkok	26	18	7	1	59	19	61	1st	QF	R1	QR2	(Brazil) Carlos Eduardo dos Santos Lima, (Thailand) Wichaya Pornprasart	19
2024–25	T2	32	13	6	13	42	50	45	8th	R2	R1		(Thailand) Wichaya Pornprasart	12
2025–26	T2	34	9	8	17	40	56	35	18th	QR1	R1			

Champions	Runners-up	Third place	Promoted	Relegated

- P = Played
- W = Games won
- D = Games drawn
- L = Games lost
- F = Goals for
- A = Goals against
- Pts = Points
- Pos = Final position
- TPL = Thai Premier League
- QR1 = First Qualifying Round
- QR2 = Second Qualifying Round
- QR3 = Third Qualifying Round
- QR4 = Fourth Qualifying Round
- RInt = Intermediate Round
- R1 = Round 1
- R2 = Round 2
- R3 = Round 3
- R4 = Round 4
- R5 = Round 5
- R6 = Round 6
- GR = Group stage
- QF = Quarter-finals
- SF = Semi-finals
- RU = Runners-up
- S = Shared
- W = Winners

== First team squad ==
Note: Flags indicate national team as defined under FIFA eligibility rules; some limited exceptions apply. Players may hold more than one non-FIFA nationality.

No.	Pos.	Nation	Player
1	GK	THA	Nattapong Khajohnmalee
2	DF	THA	Supravee Miprathang
3	DF	THA	Thananat Rungrampan
4	DF	THA	Witthawin Klorwuttiwat
7	MF	THA	Charyl Chappuis (captain)
8	MF	JPN	Takahiro Tezuka
9	FW	THA	Nopparat Promiem (on loan from Bangkok United)
10	MF	THA	Witchaya Pornprasart
11	FW	THA	Padungsak Phothinak
14	DF	THA	Sakda Kumkun
17	MF	THA	Phattharaphol Khamsuk
21	GK	THA	Kasidech Rungkitwathananukul
23	FW	PHI	Jarvey Gayoso
24	MF	THA	Rattapoom Lonlue
25	GK	THA	Natthapong Jetsadang
27	FW	THA	Suwannaphum Ngernluang

No.	Pos.	Nation	Player
28	DF	THA	Yannarit Sukcharoen
29	MF	THA	Philip Bijawat Frey (on loan from Bangkok United)
33	DF	THA	Adisak Seebunmee
36	DF	THA	Sitthichok Mool-on
37	MF	THA	Gan Kleabphueng
45	GK	THA	Yannasit Sukcharoen
56	FW	BRA	Dudu Lima
65	DF	THA	Thitawee Aksornsri
67	FW	AUS	Ata Inia
70	FW	BRA	Deyvison Fernandes
80	MF	THA	Thanakrit Laorkai (on loan from BG Pathum United)
91	FW	THA	Kane Kidwell
99	MF	THA	Nonthaphut Panaimthon
—	MF	THA	Siripong Kongjaopha
—	FW	FRA	Greg Houla
—	FW	BRA	Jardel

== Club staff ==
Position	Name
President	(Thailand) Porntat Amatavivadhana
Vice President	(Thailand) Alex Prin Amatavivadhana
Team manager	(Thailand) Issares Puengsuea
Head coach	(Thailand) Kissakorn Krasaingoen
Assistant coach	(Thailand) Nutdanai Phakham (Thailand) Peerathorn Thattakittiya
Goalkeeper coach	(Germany) Johann Noetzel
Fitness Coach	(Thailand) Pannawat Chotananjira
Strength and Conditioning Coach	(England) Robert Morledge
Physiotherapists	(Thailand) Nonthaphat Siriwannaphar (Thailand) Buntrakun Thongnon
Sports Massage	(Thailand) Rittikorn Kerdsomboon
Sports Scientist	(Thailand) Supanat Wongsuwan
Media officer	(Thailand) Chokonan Wongsamart (Thailand) Panut Pongda (Thailand) Patpong Phetchamli
Team staff	(Thailand) Phanupong Huadleang

== Head coaches ==
- (Thailand) Thongsuk Sampahungsith 2010–2012
- (Thailand) Kiatisuk Senamuang 2012–2013
- (Brazil) Reuther Moreira 2013
- (Thailand) Pairoj Borwonwatanadilok 2013–2014
- (Serbia) Miloš Joksić 2014–2015
- (Thailand) Ekavee Siriphokasai 2015–2016
- (Thailand) Sutee Suksomkit 2016
- (Thailand) Supachart Manakrit 2017
- (Thailand) Sarawut Treephan 2017
- (Thailand) Uthai Boonmoh 2017
- (Thailand) Jakarat Tonhongsa 2018
- (England) Sean Sainsbury 2018–2019
- (Serbia) Zarko Djalovic 2019–2020
- (Germany) Sebastien Neumann 2020–2022
- (Thailand) Kissakorn Krasaingoen 2022–2025
- (Northern Ireland) Colum Curtis 2025
- (Brazil) Jose Alves Borges 2025
- (Thailand) Supachai Komsilp 2025–2026
- (Thailand) Kissakorn Krasaingoen 2026–

== Honours ==
=== Domestic leagues ===
- Thai League 3
  - Winners (1): 2023–24
- Thai League 3 Bangkok Metropolitan Region
  - Winners (1): 2023–24
- Regional League Bangkok Area Division
  - Winners (1): 2010
