= Thung Khru subdistrict =

Thung Khru ทุ่งครุ
- Khwaeng
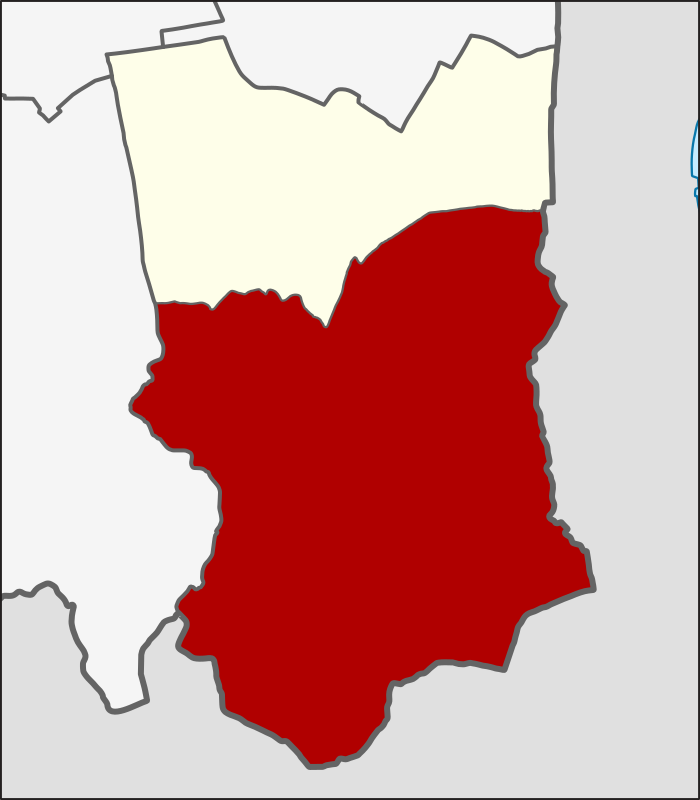
- Location in Thung Khru District
- Country: Thailand
- Province: Bangkok
- Khet: Thung Khru

Area
  - Total: 17.976 km^{2} (6.941 sq mi)

Population (2020)
  - Total: 68,222
- Time zone: UTC+7 (ICT)
- Postal code: 10140
- TIS 1099: 104902

Thung Khru (Thai: ทุ่งครุ, pronounced [tʰûŋ kʰrúʔ]) is a khwaeng (subdistrict) of Thung Khru District, in Bangkok, Thailand. In 2020, it had a total population of 68,222 people.
