= Watcharakorn Manoworn =

Thai footballer (born 1996)

Personal information
- Full name: Watcharakorn Manoworn
- Date of birth: 17 June 1996 (age 30)
- Place of birth: Chiang Rai, Thailand
- Height: 1.74 m (5 ft 9 in)
- Position: Midfielder

Team information
- Current team: Bangkok
- Number: 18

Youth career
- 2014: Police United
- 2014–2015: Chiangrai United

Senior career*
Years	Team	Apps	(Gls)
2015	Nan		
2015	Roi Et United		
2016–2018	Lampang		
2019–2021	Buriram United	0	(0)
2019	→ Khon Kaen (loan)	16	(0)
2020–2021	→ Uthai Thani (loan)	10	(0)
2021–2022	Uthai Thani	22	(2)
2022	Krabi	12	(0)
2023–2024	Uthai Thani	28	(0)
2024–	Bangkok	23	(0)
- * Club domestic league appearances and goals as of 27 February 2025

Watcharakorn Manoworn (Thai: วัชรกร มะโนวร, born June 17, 1996) is a Thai professional footballer who plays as a midfielder for Thai League 2 club Bangkok.

== Honours ==
=== Club ===
Buriram United

- Thailand Champions Cup (1): 2019

Uthai Thani

- Thai League 3 (1): 2021–22
- Thai League 3 Northern Region (1): 2021–22
