= 72nd Anniversary Stadium (Bang Mod) =

Stadium in Thung Khru, Bangkok, Thailand

60th Anniversary Stadium (Bang Mod)
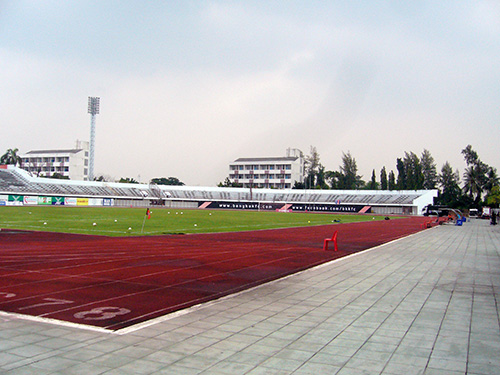
- Coordinates: 13°38′48″N 100°29′34″E
- Owner: Bangkok Metropolitan Administration
- Operator: Bangkok Metropolitan Administration
- Capacity: 8,000
- Surface: grass

Construction
- Built: 1988

Tenants
- Bangkok F.C.

60th Anniversary Stadium (Bang Mod) or Chalerm Phrakiat Bang Mod Stadium (Thai: สนามกีฬาเฉลิมพระเกียรติ 60 พรรษา บางมด) is a multi-purpose stadium in Thung Khru, Bangkok, Thailand.

The stadium built for celebration of the 60th Birthday Anniversary of King Bhumibol Adulyadej, hence the name of the venue. It is currently used mostly for football matches and is the home stadium of Bangkok. The stadium holds 8,000 people.
