= Yayar Kunath =

Thai footballer

Personal information
- Date of birth: 7 February 1989 (age 37)
- Place of birth: Satun, Thailand
- Height: 1.69 m (5 ft 7 in)
- Position: Right winger

Youth career
- VfL Maschen
- TSV Winsen/Luhe
- –2005: Hamburger SV
- 2005–2006: SC Vier- und Marschlande

Senior career*
Years	Team	Apps	(Gls)
2006–2008	Busaiteen Club		
2008–2009	Qalali Club		
2009	Al-Najma SC		
2009–2010	Isa Town FC		
2010–2013	ASV Bergedorf	81	(24)
2013–2018	Eintracht Norderstedt	120	(11)
2018–2020	Nakhon Ratchasima	24	(1)
2020–2021	TSV Buchholz 08	17	(5)
Total		242	(41)
- * Club domestic league appearances and goals

Yayar Kunath (Thai: ยายาร์ คูนาธ; born 7 February 1989) is a Thai former professional footballer who played as a right winger.

== Career ==
During the summer, Kunath would play for the European Football Academy in England, where he lived with an uncle. At age 17, he went to Bahrain through one of his coaches who wanted to establish a football academy there, where he helped coach youth teams and played in the first and second divisions. After that, Kunath waited for a transfer to England but it never happened.

In 2013, Kunath trialed with Suphanburi in Thailand, but failed to earn a contract because they said he was too small. In 2018, he returned to Thailand with Nakhon Ratchasima, where he played for two seasons.

In 2020, he signed for TSV Buchholz 08. He left the club in January 2022.

== Personal life ==
Kunath was born in Satun, Thailand.
