= Phattharaphol Khamsuk =

Thai footballer (born 1996)

Personal information
- Full name: Phattharaphol Khamsuk
- Date of birth: 22 July 1996 (age 30)
- Place of birth: Khon Kaen, Thailand
- Height: 1.75 m (5 ft 9 in)
- Positions: Attacking midfielder; winger

Team information
- Current team: Bangkok
- Number: 17

Youth career
- 2013–2016: Hyde United

Senior career*
Years	Team	Apps	(Gls)
2015–2018	Hyde United	41	(6)
2018–2021	Bangkok United	1	(0)
2019	→ Air Force United (loan)	16	(0)
2020–2022	Nonthaburi United	47	(6)
2023	Ratchaburi	4	(0)
2023–	Bangkok	40	(4)
- * Club domestic league appearances and goals

Phattharaphol Khamsuk (Thai: ภัทรพล คำสุข, simply known as Big (Thai: บิ๊ก); born 22 July 1996) is a Thai footballer who plays as an attacking midfielder or winger for Thai League 2 club Bangkok.

== Club career ==
Phattharaphol is the first Thai football player who played in FA Cup with Hyde United.

== Honours ==
Bangkok

- Thai League 3: 2023–24
- Thai League 3 Bangkok Metropolitan Region: 2023–24
