= King Mongkut's University of Technology Thonburi =

Public university in Bangkok, Thailand

Coordinates: 13°39′06″N 100°29′44″E

- มหาวิทยาลัยเทคโนโลยีพระจอมเกล้าธนบุรี
- Former names: Thonburi Technical College; King Mongkut's Institute of Technology, Thonburi Campus; King Mongkut's Institute of Technology Thonburi
- Motto: Danto Seṭṭho Manussesu
- Motto in English: "The trained man wins"
- Type: Autonomous public research university
- Established: February 4, 1960
- Affiliations: ASAIHL
- President: Assoc. Prof. Dr. Suvit Tia
- Royal conferrer: Maha Chakri Sirindhorn, Princess Royal of Thailand on behalf of the King
- Location: (Main campus); Bang Mot, Thung Khru, Bangkok, Thailand
- Campus: Urban Bang Mot (Main campus) Rural Bangkhuntien campus Ratchaburi campus
- Colors: Orange; Yellow
- Mascot: Ant
- Website: kmutt.ac.th kmutt.ac.th/en

The King Mongkut's University of Technology Thonburi (KMUTT, Thai: มหาวิทยาลัยเทคโนโลยีพระจอมเกล้าธนบุรี; RTGS: maha witthayalai theknoloyi phrachomklao thonburi; colloquially "Bangmod", Thai: บางมด; RTGS: bang mot) is a national public engineering and technology university in Thailand, focusing on teaching and research. It is one of nine national research universities (NRU) in Thailand. It is in Bang Mot Sub-district, Thung Khru District, Bangkok. It was founded on 18 April 1960, making it the third oldest engineering school and seventh oldest university in Thailand.

== History ==
King Mongkut's University of Technology Thonburi can trace its origin to the Thonburi Technical College (TTC) which was established on 4 February 1960, by the Department of Vocational Education, Ministry of Education. TTC had the mission of training technicians, technical instructors, and technologists. By virtue of the Technology Act, enacted 21 April 1971, three technical institutes are under the Department of Vocational Education: Thonburi Technical Institute (TTI), North Bangkok Technical Institute, and Nonthaburi Telecommunication Institute. They were combined to form one degree-granting institution under the name King Mongkut's Institute of Technology (KMIT) spread across three campuses. TTC thus became KMIT Thonburi campus. In 1974, KMIT was transferred from the Ministry of Education to the Ministry of University Affairs.

A new technology act was enacted 19 February 1986: the three campuses of KMIT became three autonomous institutes, each having university status. KMIT Thonburi campus became King Mongkut's Institute of Technology Thonburi (KMITT).

KMITT purchased 460 acres (1.9 km^{2}) of land to expand the campus.

== Symbol ==
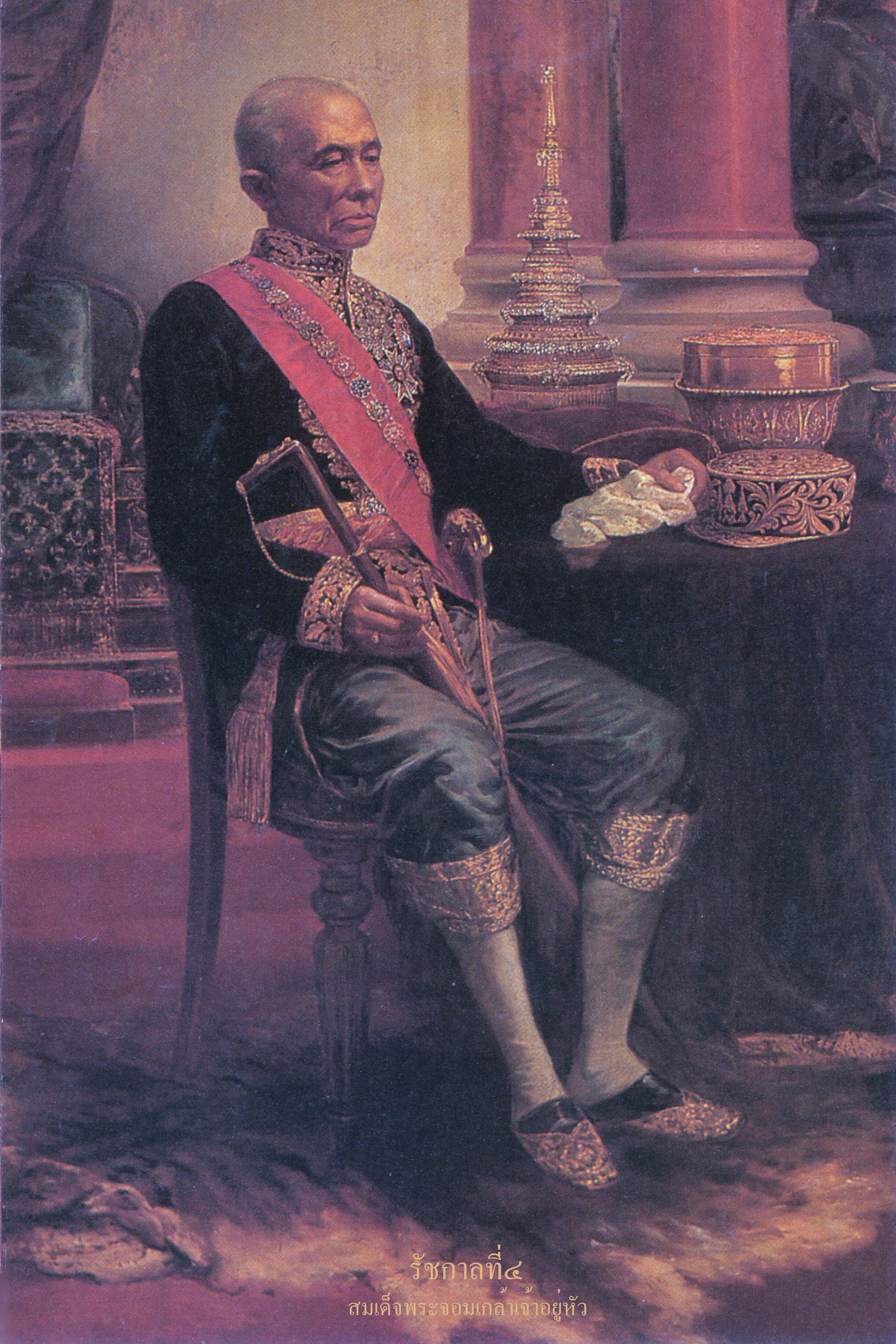
King Rama IV (Mongkut)

The university's formal seal is the personal seal of King Mongkut, also known as Rama IV. In the middle of the seal is the Great Crown of Victory, the most important of the five royal regailia of Thailand: the great crown of victory; the sword of victory; the royal staff; the royal slippers; and the royal fan and royal fly whisk) It has a white tiered umbrella of kingship bracing both sides. All of the symbols are displayed in a two-layered circle with text both in Thai and English showing the name of the university. This seal is used for announcements and official documents and is included in all of the ceremonies of the university.

The flower of King Mongkut's University of Technology Thonburi is "Thammaruksa", a flower that can easily be found on campus. The university color imitates that of the flower.

== Faculties and Schools ==
KMUTT has the following Faculties and Schools along with their respective departments and offices:

=== Faculty of Engineering (FoE) ===
The Faculty of Engineering consist of 12 departments and 1 office:

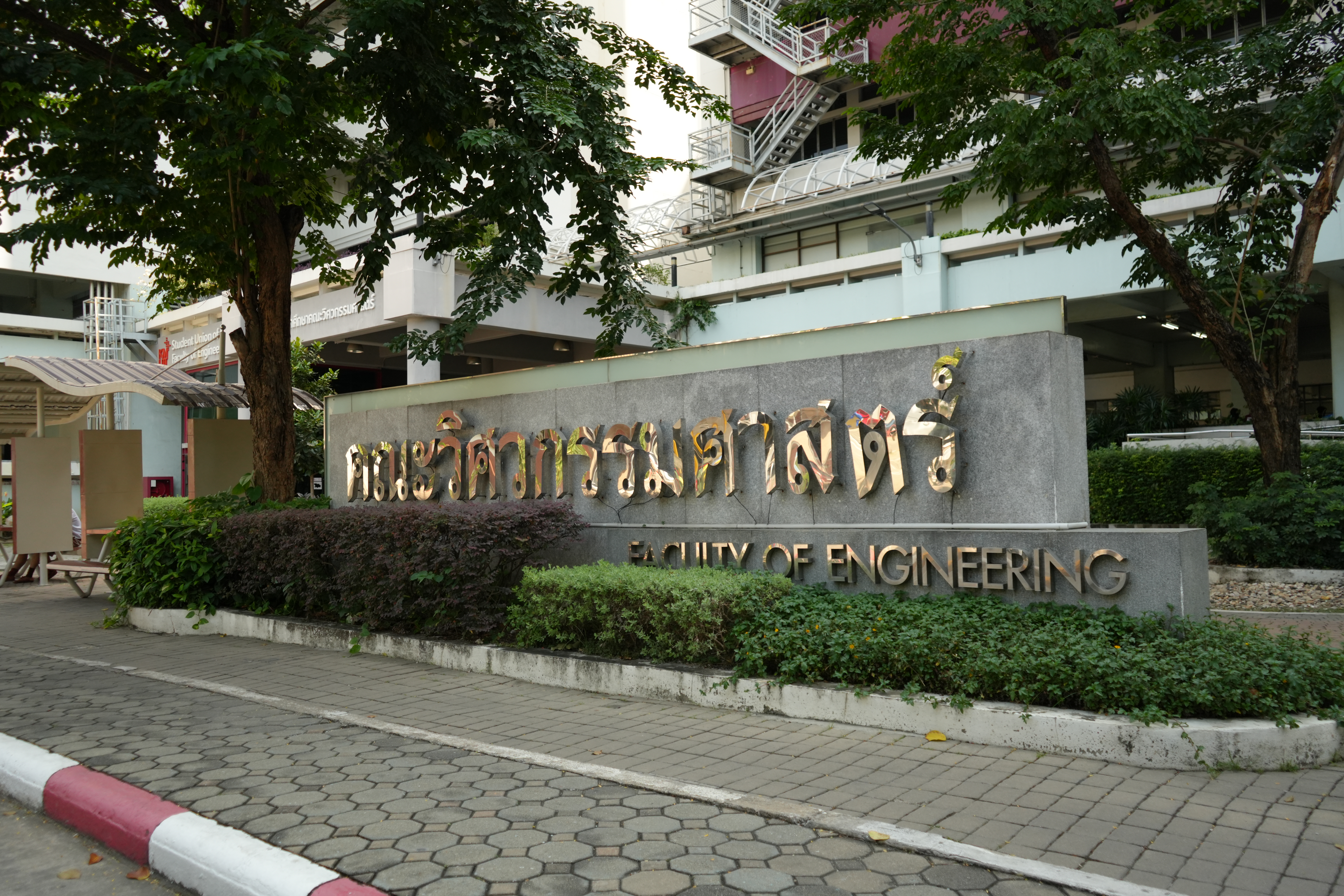
The Faculty of Engineering sign, 2025.

- Office of the Dean
- Department of Biological Engineering
- Department of Chemical Engineering
- Department of Civil Engineering
- Department of Computer Engineering
- Department of Control System and Instrumentation Engineering
- Department of Electrical Engineering
- Department of Electronics and Telecommunications Engineering
- Department of Environmental Engineering
- Department of Food Engineering
- Department of Mechanical Engineering
- Department of Production Engineering
- Department of Tool and Materials Engineering

=== Faculty of Science (FSci) ===
The Faculty of Science consist of 6 departments and 1 office:

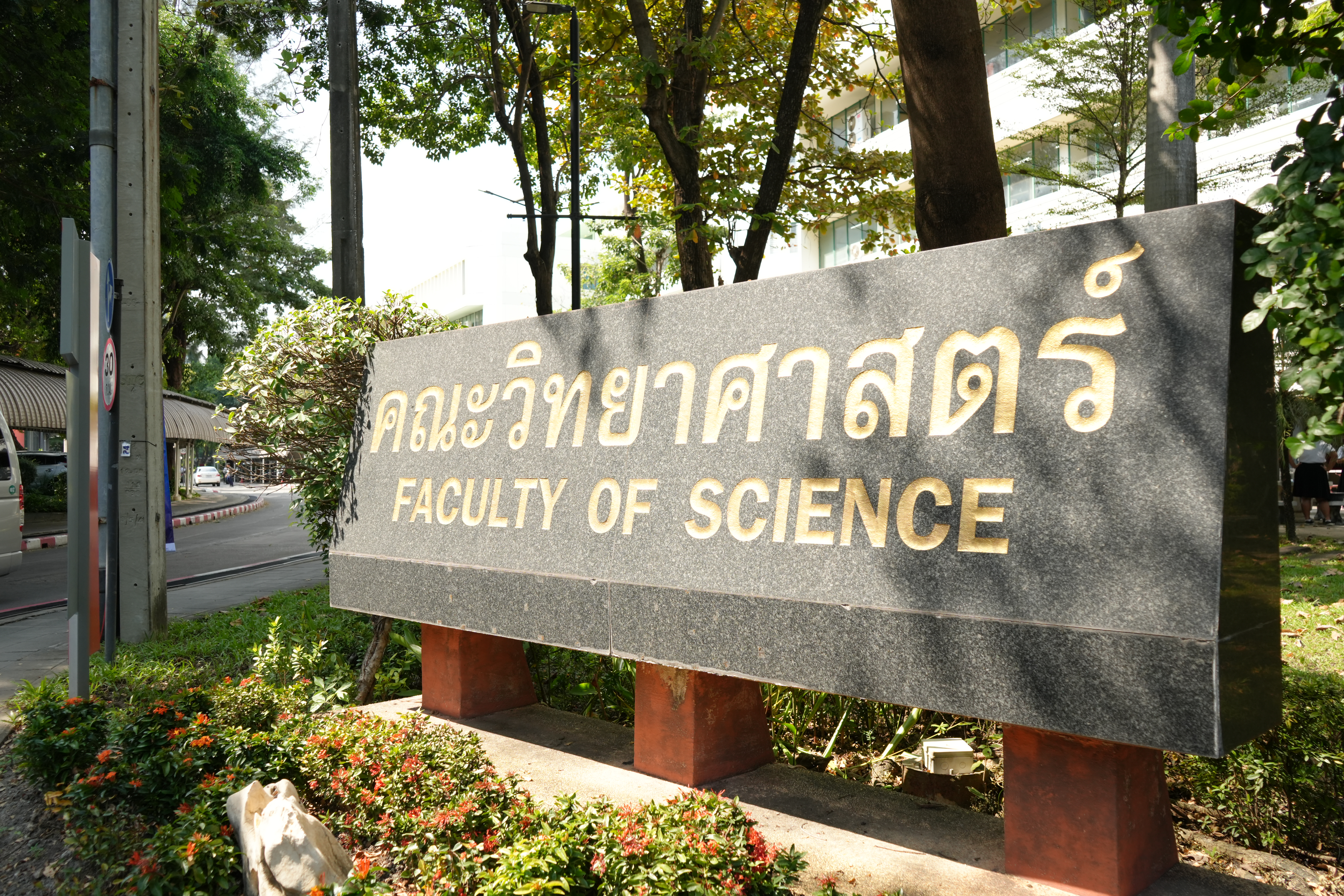
The Faculty of Science sign, 2024.

- Office of the Dean
- Department of Chemistry
- Department of Mathematics
- Department of Microbiology
- Department of Physics
- Department of Scientific Instrument Center for Standard and Industry

=== Faculty of Industrial Education and Technology (FIET) ===
The Faculty of Industrial Education and Technology consist of 4 departments and 3 offices:

- Department of Civil Technology Education
- Department of Electrical Technology Education
- Mechanical Technology Education
- Department of Production Technology Education
- Educational Communication and Technology Department
- Division of Computer and Information Technology
- Department of Printing and Packaging Technology

=== School of Liberal Arts (SoLA) ===
School of Liberal Arts consist of 2 offices:

- President Office
- Office of General Education (GenEd)

=== School of Information Technology (SIT) ===
The School of Information Technology faculty is located at a small building, near the library, at the Bangmod main campus.

University rankings

Global – Overall
- QS World: 901-950 (2026)

Regional – Overall
- QS Asia: 224 (2025)

SIT students study in two locations at KMUTT: classroom building 2 on third floor and the SIT building. The classroom building 2 is divided into seven classrooms and two common rooms that have computers, and the SIT building has five training rooms and three labs for relaxation or working. On the second floor, there is a private SIT library with technical books. Most classes have a teacher assistant to help student with lessons.

Programs offered here range from undergraduate to PHD. The bachelor's degree is divided into information technology and computer science (which are taught in English).

In August 1995, the first Bachelor of Science in Information Technology degree was offered. In April–June 2000, the first Computer Science courses (in English) for a bachelor's degree and a master's degree were offered. Later, the Master's and Doctor course in Information Technology was offered. In May 2002, an E-Learning project opened, which provided students with the opportunity to view lessons on DVD and CD. The project was expanded so that students could prepare or repeat lessons, on demand, on the Internet. In June 2004, master's degree courses in Software Engineering were first offered to students.

=== School of Architecture and Design (SoA+D) ===
The School of Architecture and Design consist of 2 offices:

- President Office
- Media Arts and Technology

=== School of Energy Environment and Materials (SEEM) ===
The School of Energy Environment and Materials consist of 7 offices and 1 laboratory:

- President Office
- Energy Technology
- Energy Management Technology
- Materials Technology / Integrated Product Design and Manufacturing
- Environmental Technology
- Thermal Technology
- Polymer Processing and Flow Research Group (P-PROF)
- EnConLab ( Energy Conservation Laboratory)

=== School of Bioresources and Technology (SBT) ===
The School of Bioresources and Technology consist of 3 offices:

- President Office
- Biotechnology
- Postharvest Technology

=== Institute of Field Robotics (FIBO) ===
The Institute of Field Robotics consist of 1 office:

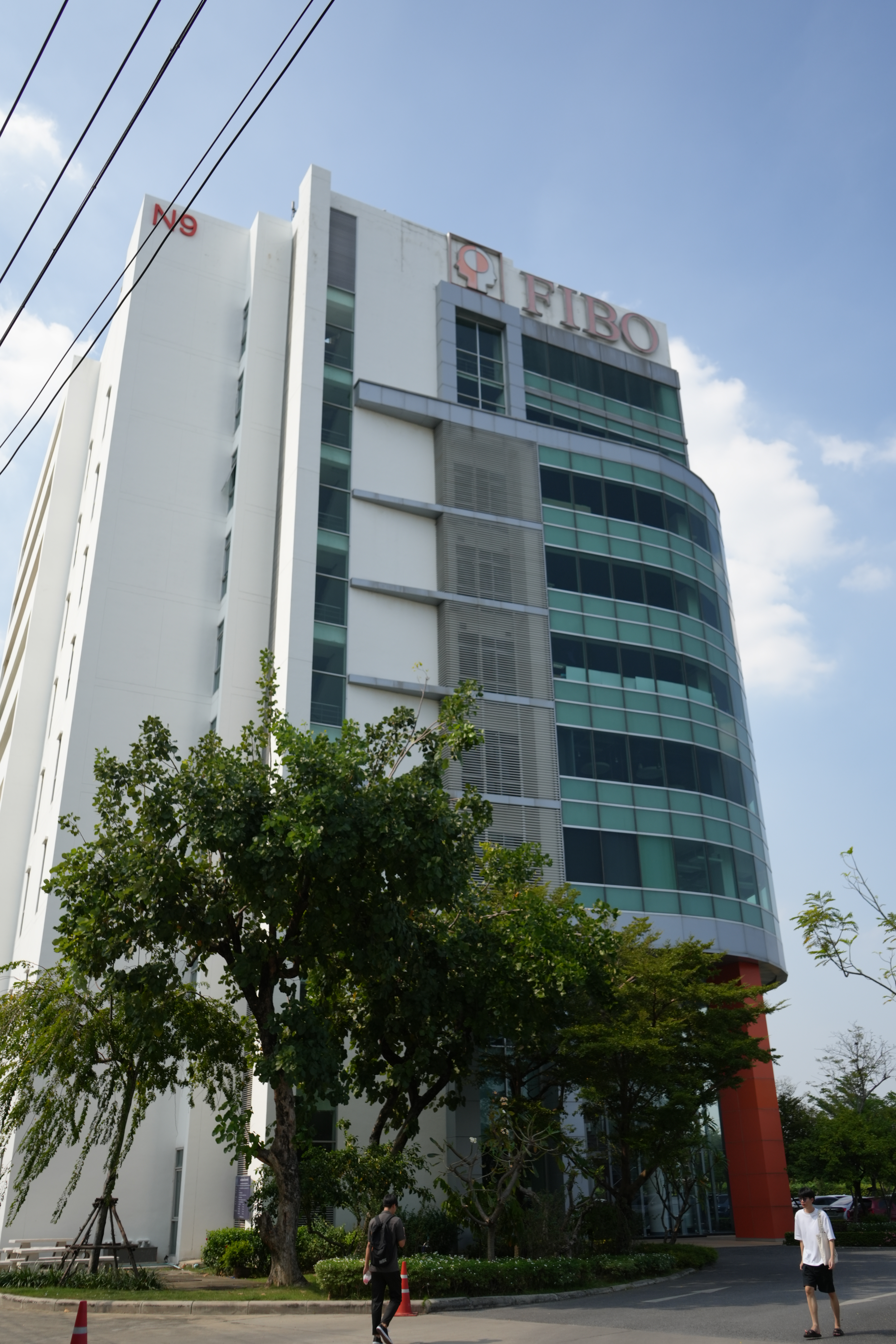
The Institute of Field Robotics, 2024.

- President Office

=== Graduate School of Management and Innovation (GMI) ===
The Graduate School of Management and Innovation consist of 1 office:

- President Office

== Campuses ==
=== Bangmod main campus ===
Bang Mot is the main campus of KMUTT, in Thonburi on Prachauthit Road. The area of the main campus is 52 acres (0.21 km^{2}). The Faculty of Engineering; Faculty of Science; Faculty of Industrial Education and Technology; School of Energy, Environmental and Materials; the School of Information Technology; the School of Liberal Arts; the Joint Graduate School of Energy and Environment; Graduate School of Management and Innovation; Institute of Field Robotics; Institute for Scientific and Technological Research and Services; Computer Center; and KMUTT Library are all present on this campus.

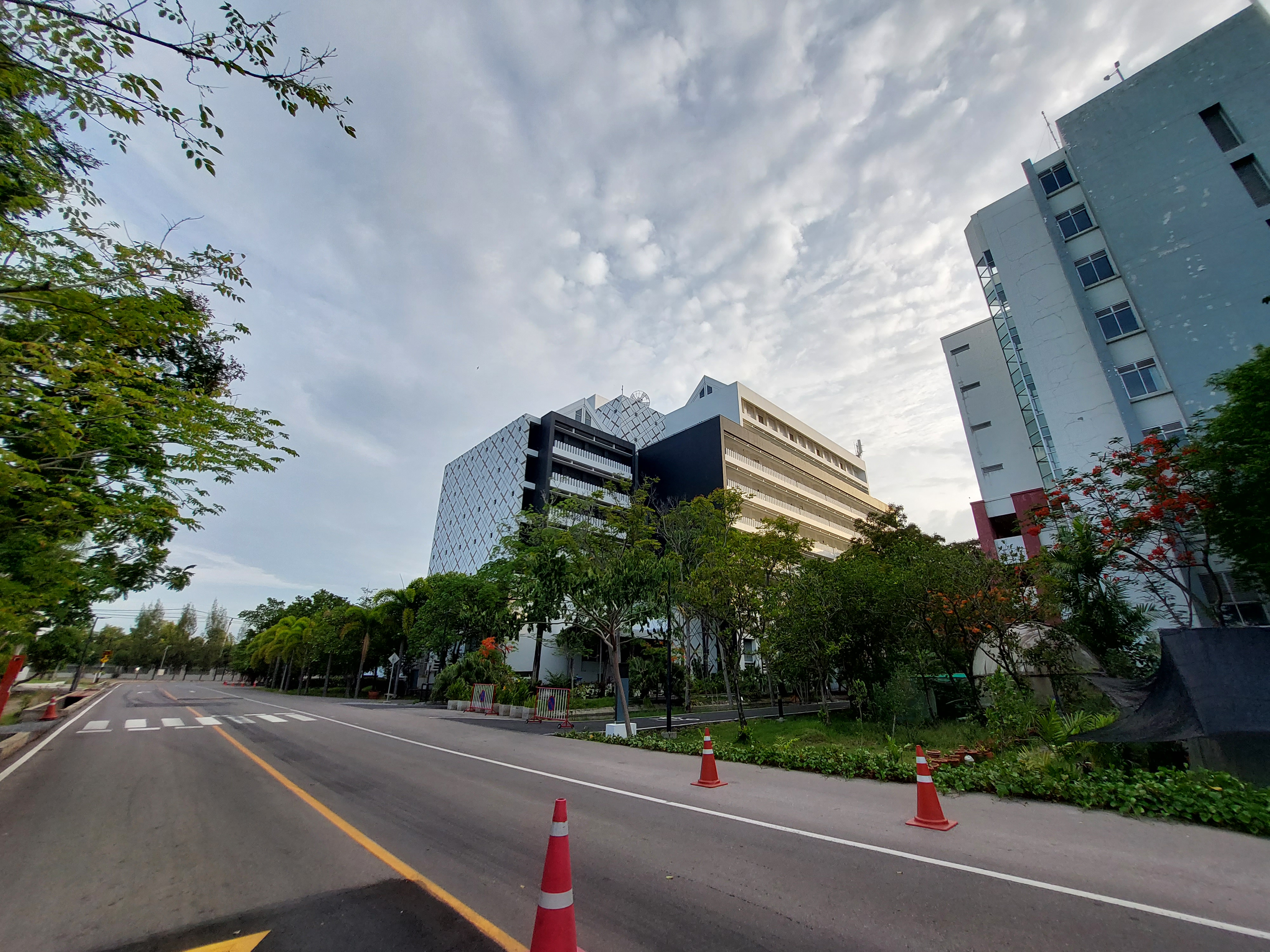
School of Architecture and Design, Bang Khun Thian campus

=== Bang Khun Thian Campus ===
The Bang Khun Thian Campus, 80 acres (0.32 km^{2}) in size, contains the School of Architecture and Design, the School of Bioresources and Technology, the Pilot Plant Development and Training Institute, and the Industrial Park. It is in Bangkok's Bang Khun Thian District.

=== Ratchaburi Campus ===
The Ratchaburi campus is located in Ratchaburi province, approximately 150 kilometers to the west of the main Bangmod campus in Bangkok. A 500 million baht budget was allocated for construction in 2010.

== Transportation ==
KMUTT provides a free bus service between the Bangmod campus and the Bang Khun Thian campus for students, staff, and visitors. The first trip from the Bangmod campus to the Bang Khun Thian campus is at 7:30 A.M. and the last trip is at 6:00 P.M. The first trip in the opposite direction from the Bang Khun Thian campus to the Bangmod campus starts at 8:00 A.M. and the last trip is at 7:00 P.M.

== KMUTT Library ==
The "KMUTT Library and Information Center" was founded on 5 May 1988. On 19 October 2000 its name was changed to "KMUTT Library".
