= Bunlue Thongkliang =

Thai footballer (born 1995)

Personal information
- Full name: Bunlue Thongkliang
- Date of birth: 6 May 1995 (age 31)
- Place of birth: Surat Thani, Thailand
- Height: 1.70 m (5 ft 7 in)
- Position: Left winger

Team information
- Current team: Bangkok
- Number: 7

Senior career*
Years	Team	Apps	(Gls)
2015–2018	Suphanburi	4	(0)
2018	→ Angthong (loan)		
2019–	Bangkok	86	(28)
- * Club domestic league appearances and goals as of 6 May 2023

Bunlue Thongkliang (Thai: บรรลือ ทองเกลี้ยง, born May 6, 1995) is a Thai professional footballer who plays as a left winger for Thai League 2 club Bangkok.

== Honours ==
Bangkok

- Thai League 3: 2023–24
- Thai League 3 Bangkok Metropolitan Region: 2023–24
