= Thung Khru district =

Thung Khru ทุ่งครุ
- Khet
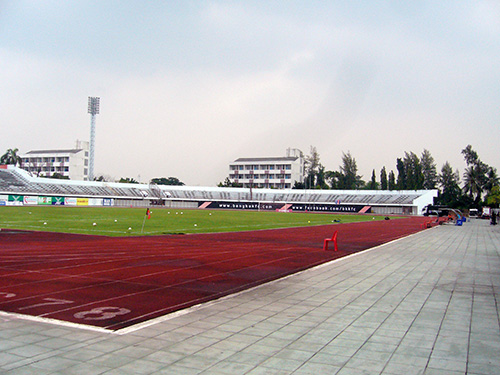
- 72nd Anniversary Stadium (Bang Mod)

- Khet location in Bangkok
- Country: Thailand
- Province: Bangkok
- Seat: Thung Khru
- Khwaeng: 2
- Khet established: 6 March 1998

Area
  - Total: 30.741 km^{2} (11.869 sq mi)

Population (2017)
  - Total: 121,833
  - Density: 3,963.2/km^{2} (10,265/sq mi)
- Time zone: UTC+7 (ICT)
- Postal code: 10140
- Geocode: 1049

Thung Khru (Thai: ทุ่งครุ, pronounced [tʰûŋ kʰrúʔ]) is one of the 50 districts (khet) of Bangkok, Thailand. The district is bounded by (clockwise from north) Rat Burana District of Bangkok, Amphoe Phra Pradaeng and Amphoe Phra Samut Chedi of Samut Prakan province, Bang Khun Thian and Chom Thong of Bangkok.

Khet Thung Khru is a second-order administrative division. The district was established as Rat Burana. It became Khet Thung Khru in 1998. It was then moved back to Thonburi Province until Thonburi and Bangkok were merged. Thung Khru means 'the plain in the larger area'. "Thung" is a Thai word which means 'flat land' while "khru" has several meanings. It is thought that khru here stands for a kind of utensil woven and coated for water transport, hence an indication that the area was once famous for the handicraft. Thung Khru has two sub-districts (khwaeng), Bang Mot and Thung Khru. Although Buddhist temples in Thung Khru are not remarkable, with the possible exceptions of Wat Thung Khru, Wat Phutthabucha and Wat Bang Mot. Places of worship representing other religions are well represented.

Neighboring districts are (from the west clockwise) Thung Khru, Rat Burana, Yan Nawa, Khlong Toei, Phra Khanong, and Bang Na (all Bangkok), and the districts Mueang Samut Prakan and Phra Samut Chedi of Samut Prakan. It is at a large bend of the Chao Phraya River.

The Bang Mot tangerine is grown in the area.

== Administration ==
The district is divided into two sub-districts (khwaeng).

No.	Name	Thai	Area (km^{2})	Map
1.	Bang Mot	บางมด	12.765	Map
2.	Thung Khru	ทุ่งครุ	17.976	Map
Total			30.741	Map

== Places ==
- King Mongkut's University of Technology Thonburi (KMUTT)
- Thonburirom Park
- Tungkru Plaza Market
- Islamic College Thailand
- 72nd Anniversary Stadium (Bang Mod)
- Children's Discovery Museum Bangkok 2
- Naluang School
