= Siripong Kongjaopha =

Thai footballer

Personal information
- Full name: Siripong Kongjaopha
- Date of birth: 4 February 1997 (age 29)
- Place of birth: Nakhon Pathom, Thailand
- Height: 1.75 m (5 ft 9 in)
- Position: Defensive midfielder

Youth career
- 2014–2016: Bangkok United

Senior career*
Years	Team	Apps	(Gls)
2017–2020	Bangkok United	4	(0)
2018	→ Pattaya United (loan)	1	(0)
2019	→ Air Force United (loan)	19	(1)
2020	Chainat Hornbill	5	(0)
2020–2021	Lamphun Warriors	5	(0)
2021–2023	DP Kanchanaburi	44	(1)
2023–2025	Bangkok	39	(0)
2025–2026	Navy	20	(0)
- * Club domestic league appearances and goals as of 20 May 2026

Siripong Kongjaopha (Thai: สิริพงษ์ คงเจ้าป่า; born February 4, 1997) is a Thai professional footballer who plays as a defensive midfielder.

== Honours ==
=== Clubs ===
Dragon Pathumwan Kanchanaburi

- Thai League 3 Western Region: 2022–23

Bangkok

- Thai League 3: 2023–24
- Thai League 3 Bangkok Metropolitan Region: 2023–24
