= 2018 PT Prachuap F.C. season =

PT Prachuap 2018 football season

PT Prachuap พีที ประจวบ
2018 season
- Chairman: Songkiat Lim-aroonrak
- Head Coach: Thawatchai Damrong-Ongtrakul
- Stadium: Sam Ao Stadium; Prachuap Khiri Khan, Thailand
- Thai League T1: In progress
- Chang FA Cup: Competition not start
- Toyota League Cup: Competition not start
- Top goalscorer: League: Jonatan Ferreira Reis (13); All: Jonatan Ferreira Reis (13)
- Highest home attendance: 4,909 v SCG Muangthong United; 11 March 2018, Thai League T1
- Lowest home attendance: 3,280 v Pattaya United; 24 February 2018, Thai League T1
- Biggest win: 6-1 v SCG Muangthong United; 11 March 2018, Thai League T1
- Biggest defeat: 0-3 v Buriram United; 11 March 2018, Thai League T1
- All statistics correct as of June 3rd, 2018.

2018 was the first seasons in top-tier of Thai football league, Thai League 1 . This season, the club sent the team under the name of PT Prachuap F.C. for sponsorship purposes.

On this season, PT Prachaup F.C. participate in 3 official competitions, Thai League T1, Chang FA Cup and Toyota League Cup.

== Kit ==
Supplier: Warrix Sports Kit Manufacturer
shirt sponsorship: PTG Energy

Home Kit	Away Kit

== Upcoming Match ==
Date / Time	Competition	Opponents	Venue	Location
9 June 2018; 19:00 (ICT)		Ubon UMT United	Sam Ao Stadium	Prachuap Khiri Khan, Thailand

== Last match result ==
26 May 2018 Toyota Thai League 1 Matchday 17	Suphanburi	0 – 0	PT Prachuap	Suphan Buri Provincial Stadium, Suphan Buri, Thailand
18:00 ICT	Wasan Homsan (yellow card) 72'	Report	Adnan Orahovac (yellow card) 45'; Jonatan Ferreira Reis (yellow card) 65'	Attendance: 2,687; Referee: Chayapol Lhaosupan; Man of the Match: Tanasith Siripala (SPFC)

== Players ==
=== Current squad ===
Note: Flags indicate national team as defined under FIFA eligibility rules; some limited exceptions apply. Players may hold more than one non-FIFA nationality.

No.	Pos.	Nation	Player
1	GK	THA	Hatsachai Sankla
3	DF	THA	Sompob Nilwong
4	DF	THA	Anurak Kamonjit
5	MF	THA	Chanintorn Pohirun
7	FW	THA	Nattapoom Maya
9	DF	THA	Wanmai Setthanan
10	FW	BRA	Jonatan Ferreira Reis (on loan from Nakhon Pathom United)
11	MF	THA	Chitpanya Tisud (on loan from Buriram United)
13	MF	THA	Yai Nilwong
14	FW	THA	Nonthawat Rak-ok
15	DF	THA	Seeket Madputeh
17	FW	THA	Amorn Thammanarm
18	MF	THA	Apichart Denman (on loan from Buriram United)
19	DF	KOR	Kwon Dae-hee
20	MF	THA	Sutee Chantorn
21	FW	GUI	Lonsana Doumbouya
22	DF	MNE	Adnan Orahovac

No.	Pos.	Nation	Player
23	MF	THA	Phanuwat Jinta
25	DF	THA	Adul Muensamaan (Captain)
26	GK	THA	Kwanchai Suklom (on loan from Buriram United)
27	DF	THA	Peerawat Akkatam (on loan from Buriram United)
31	MF	THA	Wanchalerm Yingyong
35	FW	THA	Siroch Chatthong
37	MF	THA	Kritsananon Srisuwan (on loan from Ratchaburi Mitr Phol)
39	GK	THA	Siwapong Pankaew
40	MF	THA	Adisak Ganu
42	MF	THA	Decha Sa-ardchom
91	GK	THA	Somporn Yos (on loan from Muangthong United)
—	FW	THA	Siripong Wangkulam
—	MF	THA	Saharat Panmarchya
—	MF	THA	Ratchapol Nawanno
—	MF	THA	Apichai Munotsa
—	DF	THA	Yossawat Montha (on loan from Port)
—	MF	THA	Yutpichai Lertlam (on loan from Buriram United)

=== Out on loan ===
Note: Flags indicate national team as defined under FIFA eligibility rules; some limited exceptions apply. Players may hold more than one non-FIFA nationality.

No. / Pos. / Nation / Player; — / MF / THA / Alongkorn Jornnathong (on loan at Rayong)	No. / Pos. / Nation / Player; — / DF / THA / Ekkaluck Lungnam (on loan at Trat)

=== Foreign players registration ===
The number of foreign players is restricted to five per Thai League team (3 foreign players, 1 AFC player and 1 ASEAN player) . A team can use four foreign players on the field in each game, including at least one player from the AFC country.

Note: Flags indicate national team as has been registered to the official Thai League T1. Players may hold more than one FIFA and non-FIFA nationality.

Other foreign players.
AFC quota players.
ASEAN quota players.
No foreign player registered.

Leg	Player 1	Player 2	Player 3	AFC Player	ASEAN Player	Former Player
First	(Brazil) Jonatan Ferreira Reis	(Montenegro) Adnan Orahovac	(Guinea) Lonsana Doumbouya	(South Korea) Kwon Dae-hee	(Myanmar) Lin Kyaw Chit	-

== Season Friendly Matches ==
13 Jan 2018 Friendly	PT Prachuap	3–2	True Bangkok United	Hua Hin, Prachuap Khiri Khan, Thailand
16:00 ICT	Jonatan Ferreira Reis 21' (pen.), 36'; Chitpanya Tisud 55'		Vander Luiz 18'; Putthinan Wannasri 25'	Stadium: True Arena

17 Jan 2018 Friendly	Army United	1–3	PT Prachuap	Nonthaburi, Thailand
16:30 ICT	75'	Match Report	Chanintorn Pohirun 11' (pen.) <be> Apichart Denman 38'; Lin Kyaw Chit 67'	Stadium: Nonthaburi Province Stadium

24 Jan 2018 Friendly	PT Prachuap	2–0	Hua Hin City	Prachuap Khiri Khan, Thailand
16:00 ICT	Lin Kyaw Chit 35' <be> Apichart Denman 47'			Stadium: Training Ground of Sam Ao Stadium

30 Jan 2018 Friendly	Ratchaburi Mitr Phol	2–2	PT Prachuap	Ratchaburi, Thailand
TBA	Rosimar Amâncio 17' (pen.) <be> Siwarut Pholhirun 76'		Adnan Orahovac 39'; Sompob Nilwong 51'	Stadium: Mitr Phol Stadium

31 Jan 2018 Friendly	Nakhon Pathom United	1–2	PT Prachuap	Nakhon Pathom, Thailand
18:00 ICT	44'		Lonsana Doumbouya 2', 35'	Stadium: Nakhon Pathom Municipality Sport School Stadium

5 Feb 2018 Friendly	PT Prachuap	3–1	Grand-Andaman Ranong United	Prachuap Khiri Khan, Thailand
18:00 ICT	Lonsana Doumbouya; Jonatan Ferreira Reis; Sompob Nilwong		Goal	Stadium: Sam Ao Stadium

2 June 2018 Friendly	PT Prachuap	–	Police Tero	Surat Thani, Thailand
18:00 ICT				Stadium: Surat Thani Province Stadium

4 June 2018 Friendly	PT Prachuap	–	Cadenza Satun United	Prachuap Khiri Khan, Thailand
18:00 ICT				Stadium: Sam Ao Stadium

== Competitions ==
=== Thai League 1 ===
==== Table ====
Pos	Team	Pld	W	D	L	GF	GA	GD	Pts	Qualification or relegation
4	Muangthong United	34	16	11	7	65	53	+12	59	
5	Chiangrai United (Q)	34	15	10	9	52	36	+16	55	Qualification to 2019 AFC Champions League Preliminary round 2 (Note: Chiangrai United qualified to the 2019 AFC Champions League Preliminary round 2 as winners of the 2018 Thai FA Cup.)
6	Prachuap	34	15	8	11	56	46	+10	53	
7	Nakhon Ratchasima	34	13	8	13	36	44	−8	47	
8	Pattaya United	34	13	7	14	50	62	−12	46 (Note: Head-to-head record (Mini league): Pattaya United 10 pts, Chonburi 6 pts, Suphanburi 1 pt.)	

Source: Thai League
Rules for classification: 1) Points; 2) Head-to-head points; 3) Head-to-head goals difference; 4) Head-to-head goals scored; 5) Overall goals difference; 6) Overall goals scored; 7) Fair play points; 8) Play-off without extra time;).
(Q) Qualified for the phase indicated

==== Results by matchday ====
Matchday	1	2	3	4	5	6	7	8	9	10	11	12	13	14	15	16	17	18	19	20	21	22	23	24	25	26	27	28	29	30	31	32	33	34
Ground	H	A	H	A	H	A	H	A	H	A	A	H	A	H	H	A	A																	
Result	W	L	W	L	W	W	D	W	W	L	L	W	L	W	W	L	D																	
Position	3	11	5	9	5	4	3	2	2	2	4	3	3	3	3	4	5																	

Updated to match(es) played on 18 March 2018. Source: Thai League T1
A = Away; H = Home; W = Win; D = Draw; L = Loss

==== Matches ====
11 Feb 2018 Matchday 1	PT Prachuap	3–2	Police Tero	Prachuap Khiri Khan, Thailand
19:00 ICT	Amorn Thammanarm 50'; Jonatan Ferreira Reis 65'; Lonsana Doumbouya 72' (pen.) Decha Sa-ardchom (red card) 52'; Adun Muensamaan (yellow card) 55'; Wanchalerm Yingyong (yellow card) 78'	Report	Aung Thu 9' <be> Marcos Vinícius 61' Kitphom Bunsan (yellow card) 12' <be> Thitathorn Aksornsri (yellow card) 57'; Nikom Somwang (yellow card) 75'; Nopphon Ponkam (yellow card) 83'	Stadium: Sam Ao Stadium; Attendance: 3,820; Referee: Torpong Somsing; Man of the Match: Lonsana Doumbouya (PTPRCHFC)

18 Feb 2018 Matchday 2	Ubon UMT United	3–1	PT Prachuap	Ubon Ratchathani, Thailand
18:00 ICT	Wuttichai Tathong 45+2'; Aguinaldo 65'; Piyachart Tamaphan 86' Wuttichai Tathong (yellow card) 43'	Report	Amorn Thammanarm 13' Seeket Madputeh (yellow card) 64'; Adnan Orahovac (yellow card) 85'	Stadium: UMT Stadium; Attendance: 2,152; Referee: Panumas Phansamo; Man of the Match: Rodrigo Paraná (UBUMT)

24 Feb 2018 Matchday 3	PT Prachuap	2–0	Pattaya United	Prachuap Khiri Khan, Thailand
19:00 ICT	Lonsana Doumbouya 20'; Adnan Orahovac 54' Adul Muensamaan (yellow card) 61'	Report	Suphanan Bureerat (yellow card) 45+1'; Picha Autra (yellow card) 74'; Rafinha (yellow card) 80' <be> Jaroensak Wonggorn (yellow card) 90+3'	Stadium: Sam Ao Stadium; Attendance: 3,280; Referee: Warinthorn Sassadee; Man of the Match: Lonsana Doumbouya (PTPRCHFC)

2 Mar 2018 Matchday 4	Buriram United	3–0	PT Prachuap	Buriram, Thailand
20:00 ICT	Diogo Luís Santo 21', 65' (pen.); Ratthanakorn Maikami 83'	Report	Lonsana Doumbouya (yellow card) 45+1'; Sompob Nilwong (yellow card) 63'	Stadium: Chang Arena; Attendance: 6,294; Referee: Weerapon Lhaosuphan; Man of the Match: Diogo Luís Santo (BRUTD)

11 Mar 2018 Matchday 5	PT Prachuap	6–1	SCG Muangthong United	Prachuap Khiri Khan, Thailand
18:00 ICT	Amorn Thammanarm 14', 38'; Chitpanya Tisud 23'; Jonatan Ferreira Reis 34'; Lonsana Doumbouya 65' (pen.), 85' Amorn Thammanarm (yellow card) 55'	Report	Jajá 55' Tristan Do (yellow card) 59'	Stadium: Sam Ao Stadium; Attendance: 4,909; Referee: Sahapop Sriboonlue; Man of the Match: Lonsana Doumbouya (PTPRCHFC)

17 Mar 2018 Matchday 6	Bangkok Glass	3–4	PT Prachuap	Pathum Thani, Thailand
18:00 ICT	Matt Smith 12'; Mario Gjurovski 85', 90+5' (pen.) Saharat Pongsuwan (yellow card) 59'; Thitipan Puangchan (yellow card) 63'	Report	Jonatan Ferreira Reis 23', 28', 33'; Amorn Thammanarm 45+2' Wanchalerm Yingyong (yellow card) 84'	Stadium: Leo Stadium; Attendance: 5,069; Referee: Pongpat Kaewbavorn; Man of the Match: Jonatan Ferreira Reis (PTPRCHFC)

28 Mar 2018 Matchday 7	PT Prachuap	1–1	True Bangkok United	Prachuap Khiri Khan, Thailand
17:45 ICT	Chitpanya Tisud 25' Kritsananon Srisuwan (yellow card) 45+2'	Report	Robson Fernandes 84' Ernesto Phumipha (yellow card) 50'; Vander Luiz (yellow card) 63'; Anthony Ampaipitakwong (yellow card) 81'	Stadium: Sam Ao Stadium; Attendance: 4,109; Referee: Wiwat Champa-on; Man of the Match: Jonatan Ferreira Reis (PTPRCHFC)

31 Mar 2018 Matchday 8	Air Force Central	1–3	PT Prachuap	Pathum Thani, Thailand
18:00 ICT	Renan Marques 80' Wanchai Jarunongkran (yellow card) 47'; Netipong Sanmahung (red card) 61'	Report	Chitpanya Tisud 17'; Lonsana Doumbouya 88'; Yai Nilwong 90+3' Kritsananon Srisuwan (yellow card) 30'; Adnan Orahovac (yellow card) 41'	Stadium: Thupatemi Stadium; Attendance: 1,769; Referee: Sivakorn Poo-Udom; Man of the Match: Renan Marques (AFCFC)

8 Apr 2018 Matchday 9	PT Prachuap	1–0	Sukhothai	Prachuap Khiri Khan, Thailand
18:00 ICT	Jonatan Ferreira Reis 8' Amorn Thammanarm (yellow card) 45+2'	Report	Chompoo Sangpo (yellow card) 49'	Stadium: Sam Ao Stadium; Attendance: 4,219; Referee: Kritsada Luangyos; Man of the Match: Kwanchai Suklom (PTPRCHFC)

11 Apr 2018 Matchday 10	Ratchaburi Mitr Phol	2–1	PT Prachuap	Ratchaburi, Thailand
17:45 ICT	Bill 35'; Kang Soo-il 87' Felipe Menezes (yellow card) 5'; Phuritad Jarikanon (yellow card) 55'; Sompong Soleb (yellow card) 84'; Ukrit Wongmeema (yellow card) 90+4'	Report	Amorn Thammanarm 80' Wanchalerm Yingyong (yellow card) 42'; Seeket Madputeh (yellow card) 43'	Stadium: Mitr Phol Stadium; Attendance: 3,497; Referee: Chairuek Ngamsom; Man of the Match: Bill (RBMFC)

21 Apr 2018 Matchday 11	Port	1–0	PT Prachuap	Khlong Toei, Bangkok, Thailand
20:00 ICT	Siwakorn Jakkuprasat 33' Siwakorn Jakkuprasat (yellow card) 56'; Adisorn Daeng-rueng (yellow card) 90+5'	Report	Amorn Thammanarm (yellow card) 43'; Lonsana Doumbouya (yellow card) 45+2'; Adisak Ganu (yellow card) 72'; Wanchalerm Yingyong (yellow card) 83'; Seeket Madputeh (yellow card) 90+5'	Stadium: PAT Stadium; Attendance: 3,985; Referee: Sivakorn Poo-Udom; Man of the Match: Siwakorn Jakkuprasat (PORTFC)

25 Apr 2018 Matchday 12	PT Prachuap	4–2	Singha Chiangrai United	Prachuap Khiri Khan, Thailand
17:45 ICT	Jonatan Ferreira Reis 14', 19'; Lonsana Doumbouya 32', 85' Lonsana Doumbouya (yellow card) 21'	Report	Cleiton Silva 49' (pen.); Phitiwat Sukjitthammakul 87' Phitiwat Sukjitthammakul (yellow card) 55'; Shinnaphat Leeaoh (yellow card) 61'; Tanasak Srisai (yellow card) 77', (red card) 77'; Chaiyawat Buran (yellow card) 81'; Pornsak Pongthong (yellow card) 90+3'	Stadium: Sam Ao Stadium; Attendance: 4,039; Referee: Panumas Phansamo; Man of the Match: Jonatan Ferreira Reis (PTPRCHFC)

29 Apr 2018 Matchday 13	Chonburi	4–2	PT Prachuap	Mueang, Chonburi, Thailand
18:00 ICT	Nattapon Malapun 38'; Ciro Alves 53'; Saharat Sontisawat 58'; Settawut Wongsai 78' Teerapong Deehamhae (yellow card) 33'	Report	Lonsana Doumbouya 19'; Amorn Thammanarm 63'	Stadium: Chonburi Stadium; Attendance: 4,991; Referee: Songkran Boonmekiat; Man of the Match: Nattapon Malapun (CHON)

5 May 2018 Matchday 14	PT Prachuap	5–0	Royal Thai Navy	Prachuap Khiri Khan, Thailand
20:00 ICT	Jonatan Ferreira Reis 16', 90+1', 90+2'; Lonsana Doumbouya 28'; Kritsananon Srisuwan 75' Kwon Dae-hee (yellow card) 54'	Report		Stadium: Sam Ao Stadium; Attendance: 3,977; Referee: Sivakorn Poo-Udom; Man of the Match: Jonatan Ferreira Reis (PTPRCHFC)

13 May 2018 Matchday 15	PT Prachuap	2–1	Nakhon Ratchasima Mazda	Prachuap Khiri Khan, Thailand
18:00 ICT	Lonsana Doumbouya 30'; Jonatan Ferreira Reis 87'	Report	Pralong Sawandee 90' Eakkanut Kongket (yellow card) 63'	Stadium: Sam Ao Stadium; Attendance: 4,158; Referee: Panumas Phansamo; Man of the Match: Lonsana Doumbouya (PTPRCHFC)

20 May 2018 Matchday 16	Chainat Hornbill	3–1	PT Prachuap	Khao Tha Phra, Mueang, Chai Nat, Thailand
19:00 ICT	Bireme Diouf 24', 80'; Bernard Doumbia 88' Chatchai Koompraya (yellow card) 57'; Anuwat Noicheunphan (yellow card) 80'	Report	Jonatan Ferreira Reis 59' Lonsana Doumbouya (yellow card) 22'; Adul Muensamaan (yellow card) 36'	Stadium: Khao Plong Stadium; Attendance: 2,811; Referee: Torpong Somsing; Man of the Match: Bireme Diouf (CNHBFC)

26 May 2018 Matchday 17	Suphanburi	0–0	PT Prachuap	Don Kamyan, Mueang, Suphan Buri, Thailand
19:00 ICT	Wasan Homsan (yellow card) 72'	Report	Adnan Orahovac (yellow card) 45'; Jonatan Ferreira Reis (yellow card) 65'	Stadium: Suphan Buri Provincial Stadium; Attendance: 2,687; Referee: Chayapol Lhaosupan; Man of the Match: Tanasith Siripala (SPFC)

9 June 2018 Matchday 18	PT Prachuap	–	Ubon UMT United	Prachuap Khiri Khan, Thailand
19:00 ICT				Stadium: Sam Ao Stadium

=== Chang FA Cup ===
TBD TBD	PT Prachuap (T1)	–	TBD	Thailand
TBD UTC+7				Stadium: TBD

=== Toyota League Cup ===
TBD TBD	PT Prachuap (T1)	–	TBD	Thailand
TBD UTC+7				Stadium: TBD

=== Season goalscorers & Man of the Match list ===
Below is a list of PT Prachaup F.C. goalscorer and man of the match (MoM) statistic on 2018 season, Recorded after a game of 2018 Thai League T1 with Suphanburi, As of 26 May 2018.

Player name	Playing Position	T1 League	FA Cup	League Cup	Total goals	Total MoM	Remark
(Brazil) Jonatan Ferreira Reis	Forward	13	0	0	13	4	-
(Guinea) Lonsana Doumbouya	Forward	10	0	0	10	4	-
(Thailand) Amorn Thammanarm	Forward	7	0	0	7	0	-
(Thailand) Chitpanya Tisud	Midfielder	3	0	0	3	0	-
(Thailand) Yai Nilwong	Midfielder	1	0	0	1	0	-
(Thailand) Kritsananon Srisuwan	Midfielder	1	0	0	1	0	-
(Montenegro) Adnan Orahovac	Defender	1	0	0	1	0	-
(Thailand) Kwanchai Suklom	Goalkeeper	0	0	0	0	1	-

=== Hat-tricks Hero ===
Player	For	Opponent	Result	Date	Competition
(Brazil) Jonatan Ferreira Reis	PT Prachuap	Bangkok Glass	4–3	17 March 2018	Thai League 1
(Brazil) Jonatan Ferreira Reis	PT Prachuap	Royal Thai Navy	5–0	5 May 2018	Thai League 1

== Season Transfers ==
First Thai footballer's market is opening on November 14, 2017, to February 5, 2018
Second Thai footballer's market is opening on June 11, 2018, to July 9, 2018

=== In ===
Date	Pos	Name	From	Fee
Pre-Season / First Transfer Windows
14 November 2017	FW	(Thailand) Nattapoom Maya	(Thailand) Phuket	Free transfer
23 November 2017	MF	(Thailand) Decha Sa-ardchom	(Thailand) Thai Honda Ladkrabang	Free transfer
23 November 2017	FW	(Thailand) Nonthawat Rak-ok	(Thailand) Jumpasri United	Free transfer ^{[1]}
23 November 2017	MF	(Thailand) Alongkorn Jornnathong	(Thailand) Lampang	Free transfer ^{[1]}
24 November 2017	DF	(Thailand) Wanmai Setthanan	(Thailand) Jumpasri United	Free transfer
15 December 2017	DF	(Thailand) Yai Nilwong	(Thailand) Ratchaburi Mitr Phol	Free transfer
20 December 2017	MF	(Thailand) Adisak Ganu	(Thailand) Chiangmai	Free transfer
6 January 2018	DF	(Montenegro) Adnan Orahovac	(Uzbekistan) Dinamo Samarqand	Free transfer
16 January 2018	MF	(Myanmar) Nanda Lin Kyaw Chit	(Singapore) Balestier Khalsa	Free transfer
17 January 2018	GK	(Thailand) Siwapong Pankaew	(Thailand) Kopoon Warrior	Undisclosed
26 January 2018	FW	(Guinea) Lonsana Doumbouya	(Austria) SKN St. Pölten	Undisclosed
Mid-Season / Second Transfer Windows
23 May 2018	FW	(Thailand) Siripong Wangkulam	(Thailand) Cadenza Satun United	Undisclosed
31 May 2018	MF	(Thailand) Saharat Panmarchya	(Thailand) Air Force Central	Undisclosed
31 May 2018	MF	(Thailand) Ratchapol Nawanno	(Thailand) Muangthong United	Undisclosed
31 May 2018	MF	(Thailand) Apichai Munotsa	(Thailand) Chonburi	Undisclosed
31 May 2018	FW	(Thailand) Siroch Chatthong	(Thailand) Muangthong United	Undisclosed

==== Out ====
Date	Pos	Name	To	Fee
Pre-Season / First Transfer Windows
24 October 2017	FW	(Brazil) Laércio Gomes Costa	Leave by mutual consent before contract expire	
22 November 2017	FW	(Brazil) Willen Mota	(Saudi Arabia) Al-Batin	Released
30 November 2017	MF	(Thailand) Karn Jorated	(Thailand) Chonburi B	End of loan
30 November 2017	FW	(Japan) Yusei Ogasawara	(Thailand) Kasetsart	Released
30 November 2017	FW	(Brazil) Neto Santos	(Thailand) Ayutthaya United	Released
30 November 2017	GK	(Thailand) Chukiat Chimwong	(Thailand) Krabi	Released
30 November 2017	MF	(Thailand) Pansiri Sukhunee	(Thailand) Samut Sakhon	Released
30 November 2017	DF	(Thailand) Nawapol Tantraseni	(Thailand) Sukhothai	Released
30 November 2017	DF	(Thailand) Wutthipan Pantalee	(Thailand) Trat	Released
30 November 2017	MF	(Thailand) Apirat Heemkhao	(Thailand) Air Force Central	Released
30 November 2017	GK	(Thailand) Wanlop Saechio	(Thailand) Navy	Released
30 November 2017	MF	(Thailand) Thanapol Jantraratsamee	Free agent	Released
30 November 2017	MF	(Thailand) Paitoon Nontadee	Free agent	Released
30 November 2017	MF	(Thailand) Chanrit Nuhthong	Free agent	Released
30 November 2017	DF	(Thailand) Siriwat Chotiwecharak	Free agent	Released
Mid-Season / Second Transfer Windows

==== Loan in ====
Date	Pos	Name	From	Until
Pre-Season / First Transfer Windows
30 October 2017	FW	(Brazil) Jonatan Reis	(Thailand) Nakhon Pathom United	End of 2018 Season
30 November 2017	GK	(Thailand) Kwanchai Suklom	(Thailand) Buriram United	End of 2018 Season
30 November 2017	DF	(Thailand) Peerawat Akkratum	(Thailand) Buriram United	End of 2018 Season
30 November 2017	MF	(Thailand) Apichart Denman	(Thailand) Buriram United	End of 2018 Season
4 December 2017	MF	(Thailand) Kritsananon Srisuwan	(Thailand) Ratchaburi Mitr Phol	End of 2018 Season
15 December 2017	MF	(Thailand) Chitpanya Tisud	(Thailand) Buriram United	End of 2018 Season
17 January 2018	GK	(Thailand) Somporn Yos	(Thailand) Muangthong United	End of 2018 Season
6 February 2018	MF	(Thailand) Wanchalerm Yingyong	(Thailand) Chiangrai United	End of 2018 Season
Mid-Season / Second Transfer Windows
1 June 2018	MF	(Thailand) Yutpichai Lertlam	(Thailand) Buriram United	End of 2018 Season
4 June 2018	DF	(Thailand) Yossawat Montha	(Thailand) Port	End of 2018 Season

==== Loan out ====
Date	Pos	Name	To	Until
Pre-Season / First Transfer Windows
Mid-Season / Second Transfer Windows
31 May 2018	MF	(Thailand) Alongkorn Jornnathong	(Thailand) Rayong	End of 2018 Season
5 June 2018	DF	(Thailand) Ekkaluck Lungnam	(Thailand) Trat	End of 2018 Season
