= 2021–22 Prachuap F.C. season =

PT Prachuap 2021–22 football season

PT Prachuap พีที ประจวบ
2021–22 season
- Chairman: Songkiat Lim-aroonrak
- Head Coach: Masami Taki (until 15 November 2021); Issara Sritaro (from 15 November 2021)
- Stadium: Sam Ao Stadium; Prachuap Khiri Khan, Thailand
- Thai League T1: 14th
- Thai FA Cup: First Round
- Thai League Cup: Competition not start
- Top goalscorer: League: - All: -
- Highest home attendance: -
- Lowest home attendance: -
- Biggest win: -
- Biggest defeat: -
- All statistics correct as of November 15th, 2021.

The 2021–22 season is PT Prachuap F.C.'s fourth season in the top tier of the Thai football league system, Thai League 1. On this season, PT Prachuap F.C. participate in 3 official competitions, Thai League 1, Chang FA Cup and Toyota League Cup.

== Kit ==
Supplier: Grand Sport
Shirt sponsorship: PTG Energy

Home Kit	Away Kit

== Managerial changes ==
Outgoing manager	Manner of departure	Date of vacancy	Week	Incoming manager
(Thailand) Thawatchai Damrong-Ongtrakul	End of contract	30 March 2021	Pre-season	(Japan) Masami Taki

== Players ==
=== Current squad ===
Note: Flags indicate national team as defined under FIFA eligibility rules; some limited exceptions apply. Players may hold more than one non-FIFA nationality.

No.	Pos.	Nation	Player
2	DF	THA	Thitawee Aksornsri (on loan from Port)
3	DF	THA	Thitathorn Aksornsri (on loan from Port)
5	DF	THA	Eakkanut Kongket
6	DF	THA	Nukoolkit Krutyai
7	FW	BRA	Tauã
8	DF	THA	Praweenwat Boonyong
9	MF	LBN	Soony Saad
10	MF	THA	Prasit Jantum
11	DF	THA	Saharat Pongsuwan (on loan from BG Pathum United)
13	FW	PHI	Patrick Reichelt
14	DF	THA	Peerawat Akkratum
15	DF	THA	Seeket Madputeh
16	DF	THA	Chinnawat Wongchai (on loan from Buriram United)
17	MF	THA	Peerapat Kaminthong
18	MF	THA	Apichart Denman
19	MF	THA	Thirayu Banhan (on loan from Chiangrai United)

No.	Pos.	Nation	Player
22	DF	MNE	Adnan Orahovac
24	GK	THA	Sarut Nasri (on loan from Chonburi)
25	DF	THA	Adun Muensamaan (Captain)
26	GK	THA	Kwanchai Suklom
29	FW	BRA	Willen Mota
31	MF	THA	Wanchalerm Yingyong
32	MF	THA	Ratchapol Nawanno (vice-captain)
35	MF	THA	Saharat Panmarchya
39	GK	THA	Siwapong Pankaew
41	MF	THA	Thanin Plodkaew
49	GK	THA	Jirunpong Thammasiha
52	DF	THA	Anawin Jujeen
55	DF	THA	Pakphum Lato
87	DF	THA	Saranyu Intarach
92	FW	THA	Mehti Sarakham
93	MF	PHI	Amin Nazari

=== Foreign players registration ===
The number of foreign players is restricted to five per Thai League team (3 foreign players, 1 AFC player and 3 ASEAN players). A team can use up to 5 foreign players on the field in each game, max 3 foreign players, 1 player from AFC country and 1 for ASEAN players.

Note: Flags indicate national team as has been registered to the official Thai League T1. Players may hold more than one FIFA and non-FIFA nationality.

Other foreign players.
AFC quota players.
ASEAN quota players.
No foreign player registered.

Leg	Foreign player 1	Foreign player 2	Foreign player 3	AFC Player	ASEAN Player 1	ASEAN Player 2	ASEAN Player 3
1	(Brazil) Tauã	(Montenegro) Adnan Orahovac	(Brazil) Willen Mota	(Lebanon) Soony Saad	-	-	-

== Season Friendly Matches ==
TBA Friendly	PT Prachuap	0–0	TBA	TBA, Thailand
16:00 ICT	-		-	Stadium: TBA

== Competitions ==
=== Overview ===
Competition	First match	Last match	Starting round	Final position	Record							
Competition	First match	Last match	Starting round	Final position	Pld	W	D	L	GF	GA	GD	Win %
Thai League	5 September 2021	21 May 2022	Matchday 1		17	2	5	10	13	24	−11	11.76
FA Cup	27 October 2021	27 October 2021	First Round	First Round	1	0	0	1	1	4	−3	0.00
League Cup	12 January 2022		First Round		1	1	0	0	2	1	+1	100.00
Total					19	3	5	11	16	29	−13	15.79

Last updated: 15 January 2022
Source: Competitions

=== Thai League 1 ===
==== League table ====
Pos	Team	Pld	W	D	L	GF	GA	GD	Pts	Qualification
11	Police Tero	30	8	13	9	33	39	−6	37	
12	Ratchaburi Mitr Phol	30	9	9	12	32	36	−4	36	
13	PT Prachuap	30	8	7	15	30	45	−15	31	
14	Suphanburi (R)	30	8	6	16	35	49	−14	30	Relegation to Thai League 2
15	Samut Prakan City (R)	30	6	10	14	29	42	−13	28	Relegation to Thai League 2

Updated to match(es) played on 4 May 2022. Source: Thai League
Rules for classification: 1) Points; 2) Head-to-head points; 3) Head-to-head goals difference; 4) Head-to-head goals scored; 5) Overall goals difference; 6) Overall goals scored; 7) Fair play points; 8) Play-off without extra time;).
(R) Relegated

==== Results by matchday ====
Matchday	1	2	3	4	5	6	7	8	9	10	11	12	13	14	15	16	17	18	19	20	21	22	23	24	25	26	27	28	29	30	31	32	33	34
Ground	H	A	A	A	H	A	H	A	A	H	A	H	A	H	H	H	H	H																
Result	D	L	D	W	L	L	D	W	L	L	L	L	L	D	D	L	L																	
Position	8	14	14	9	12	14	14	11	13	14	14	14	14	15	15	15																		

Updated to match(es) played on 15 January 2022. Source:
A = Away; H = Home; W = Win; D = Draw; L = Loss

==== Matches ====
Win Draw Loss

4 September 2021 Matchday 1	PT Prachuap	2-2	Muangthong United	Buriram
	Tauã 4'; Willen 88' (pen.)		Popp 68'; Poramet 78'	Stadium: Buriram City Stadium; Attendance: 0 Referee: Songkran Bunmeekiart

11 September 2021 Matchday 2	Khon Kaen United	2-1	PT Prachuap	Prachuap Khiri Khan
	Narongrit 38'; Ibson 83' (pen.)		Willen 68'	Stadium: Sam Ao Stadium; Attendance: 1,109; Referee: Phairot Bunkamnoed

19 September 2021 Matchday 3	Suphanburi	2-2	PT Prachuap	Suphan Buri
	Ratchanat 70'; Danilo 74'		Willen 18'; Saharat 64'	Stadium: Suphan Buri Provincial Stadium; Attendance: 0 Referee: Mongkolchai Pechsri

25 September 2021 Matchday 4	Singha Chiangrai United	1-2	PT Prachuap	Chiang Rai
	Felipe Amorim 52'		Apichart 78' 90+1'	Stadium: Singha Stadium; Attendance: 358; Referee: Warintorn Sassadee

2 October 2021 Matchday 5	PT Prachuap	0-2	Buriram United	Prachuap Khiri Khan
			Rosa 21'; Supachai 83'	Stadium: Sam Ao Stadium; Attendance: 750; Referee: Sivakorn Pu-udom

6 October 2021 Matchday 6	True Bangkok United	2-1	PT Prachuap	Pathum Thani
	Pokklaw 10'; Chananan 88'		Saharat 65'	Stadium: Thammasat Stadium; Attendance: 0 Referee: Sahapop Sriboonlue

10 October 2021 Matchday 7	PT Prachuap	0-0	Samut Prakan City	Prachuap Khiri Khan
	Mehti (red card) 38'			Stadium: Sam Ao Stadium; Attendance: 513; Referee: Anusorn Nookaew

16 October 2021 Matchday 8	Chiangmai United	0-1	PT Prachuap	Chiang Mai
			Thanin 77'	Stadium: 700th Anniversary Stadium; Attendance: 0 Referee: Natee Choosuwan

24 October 2021 Matchday 9	Port	2-0	PT Prachuap	Bangkok
	Bordin 78'; Patiño 84'			Stadium: PAT Stadium; Attendance: 936; Referee: Songkran Bunmeekiart

30 October 2021 Matchday 10	PT Prachuap	1-2	Nakhon Ratchasima	Prachuap Khiri Khan
	Willen 62' (pen.)		Pralong 19'; Karikari 88'	Stadium: Sam Ao Stadium; Attendance: 400; Referee: Chaireag Ngam-som

7 November 2021 Matchday 11	Ratchaburi Mitr Phol	2-0	PT Prachuap	Ratchaburi
	Derley 62'; Sittichok 65'			Stadium: Mitr Phol Stadium; Attendance: 1,215; Referee: Natee Choosuwan

10 November 2021 Matchday 12	PT Prachuap	1-2	Chonburi	Prachuap Khiri Khan
	Eakkanut 86'; Willen (red card) 73'		Kanyuk 45+3'; Worachit 90+5'	Stadium: Sam Ao Stadium; Attendance: 426; Referee: Phairot Bunkamnoed

13 November 2021 Matchday 13	Nongbua Pitchaya	1-0	PT Prachuap	Nong Bua Lamphu
	Airton 56'			Stadium: Pitchaya Stadium; Attendance: 1,009; Referee: Sarayut Jakngoen

21 November 2021 Matchday 14	PT Prachuap	1-1	Police Tero	Prachuap Khiri Khan
	Apichart 90+5'		Chanukun 5'	Stadium: Sam Ao Stadium; Attendance: 512; Referee: Natee Choosuwan

28 November 2021 Matchday 15	PT Prachuap	0-0	BG Pathum United	Prachuap Khiri Khan
				Stadium: Sam Ao Stadium; Attendance: 763; Referee: Vitsavet Sangnakorn

8 January 2022 Matchday 16	PT Prachuap	0-1	Khon Kaen United	Prachuap Khiri Khan
			Rômulo 43' (pen.)	Stadium: Sam Ao Stadium; Attendance: 578; Referee: Sivakorn Pu-udom

15 January 2022 Matchday 17	PT Prachuap	1-2	Suphanburi	Prachuap Khiri Khan
	Willen 70'		William 56' 61'; Santipap (yellow card) 57' (yellow-red card) 69'	Stadium: Sam Ao Stadium; Attendance: 445; Referee: Niwat Insa-ard

22 January 2022 Matchday 18	PT Prachuap	v	Leo Chiangrai United	Prachuap Khiri Khan
				Stadium: Sam Ao Stadium

=== Thai FA Cup ===
==== Matches ====
Win Draw Loss

27 October 2021 First Round	Samut Prakan City (T1)	4-1	PT Prachuap (T1)	Samut Prakan
	Chayawat 39'; Eliandro 44' 45+1'; Sakai 84'		Weerawut 61'	Stadium: Samut Prakarn SAT Stadium

=== Thai League Cup ===
==== Matches ====
Win Draw Loss

12 January 2022 First Round	Lamphun Warriors (T2)	1-2 (a.e.t.)	PT Prachuap (T1)	Lamphun
	Akarapong 67'		Ratchapol 58'; Thanakorn 120+2' (o.g.)	Stadium: Mae Guang Stadium; Attendance: 720; Referee: Sarayut Jakngoen

Second Round	v

== Season Transfers ==
=== In ===
Date from	Position	Nationality	Name	From	Fee	Ref.
5 April 2021	GK	(Thailand)	Jirunpong Thammasiha	(Thailand) Lampang	Free	
5 April 2021	RB	(Thailand)	Eakkanut Kongket	(Thailand) Nakhon Ratchasima Mazda	Free	
6 April 2021	CF	(Iraq)	Selwan Al-Jaberi	(Thailand) Grand Andaman Ranong United	Free	
18 April 2021	CF	(Thailand)	Mehti Sarakham	(Thailand) Samut Prakan City	Undisclosed	
25 April 2021	CF	(Brazil)	Tauã	(Thailand) Nakhon Pathom United	Free	
24 June 2021	MF	(Thailand)	Decha Muhamed	(Thailand) Sisaket	Undisclosed	-
4 December 2021	MF	(Lebanon)	Soony Saad	(Jordan) Al-Wehdat	Undisclosed	
2 January 2022	DF	(Thailand)	Praweenwat Boonyong	(Thailand) Ratchaburi Mitr Phol	Undisclosed	
2 January 2022	FW	(Philippines)	Patrick Reichelt	Unattached (Note: Most recently played for Suphanburi)	Free	
2 January 2022	MF	(Philippines)	Amin Nazari	(Malaysia) United City F.C.	Undisclosed	
2 January 2022	MF	(Thailand)	Apiwit Samurmuen	(Thailand) Sukhothai	Undisclosed	

==== Out ====
Date from	Position	Nationality	Name	To	Fee	Ref.
31 March 2021	FW	(Brazil)	William Henrique	Free agent (Note: Later signed for Al-Shahania)	Released	
31 March 2021	MF	(Philippines)	Iain Ramsay	Free agent (Note: Later signed for Nongbua Pitchaya)	Released	
31 March 2021	CB	(Uzbekistan)	Artyom Filiposyan	Free agent (Note: Later signed for Muangkan United)	Released	-
31 March 2021	DM	(Thailand)	Phuritad Jarikanon	Free agent (Note: Later signed for Muangkan United)	Released	-
31 March 2021	GK	(Thailand)	Wanchai Suwanin	Free agent	Released	-
31 March 2021	CF	(Thailand)	Kittisak Hochin	Free agent (Note: Later signed for Suphanburi)	Released	-
31 March 2021	CF	(Thailand)	Rawi Udomsin	Free agent	Released	-
31 March 2021	AM	(Thailand)	Chutipol Thongthae	(Thailand) Buriram United	Free (Bosman)	-
18 April 2021	GK	(Thailand)	Nattapong Khajohnmalee	(Thailand) Nongbua Pitchaya	Undisclosed	
7 July 2021	CF	(Iraq)	Selwan Al-Jaberi	Unattached (Note: Later signed for Lampang)	Undisclosed	
7 December 2021	LB	(Thailand)	Weerawut Kayem	(Thailand) Suphanburi	Free	
8 December 2021	DF	(Thailand)	Isrufan Doromae	(Thailand) Jalor City	Undisclosed	
22 December 2021	LB	(Thailand)	Weerawut Kayem	(Thailand) Suphanburi	Free	
4 January 2022	DF	(Indonesia)	Yanto Basna	Unattached	Contract Terminated	-
4 January 2022	GK	(Thailand)	Hatsachai Sankla	(Thailand) Pattaya Dolphins United	Undisclosed	-

==== Loan in ====
Date from	Position	Nationality	Name	From	Loan end	Ref.
19 April 2021	AM	(Thailand)	Thirayu Banhan	(Thailand) Chiangrai United	End of season	
30 April 2021	CB	(Thailand)	Chinnawat Wongchai	(Thailand) Buriram United	End of season	-
11 May 2021	LB	(Thailand)	Saharat Pongsuwan	(Thailand) BG Pathum United	End of season	
15 December 2021	GK	(Thailand)	Sarut Nasri	(Thailand) Chonburi	End of season	
4 January 2022	DF	(Thailand)	Thitawee Aksornsri	(Thailand) Port	End of season	
4 January 2022	DF	(Thailand)	Thitathorn Aksornsri	(Thailand) Port	End of season	

==== Loan out ====
Date from	Position	Nationality	Name	To	Loan end	Ref.
-	-	-	-	-	-	-
