= 2019 Thai League Cup final =

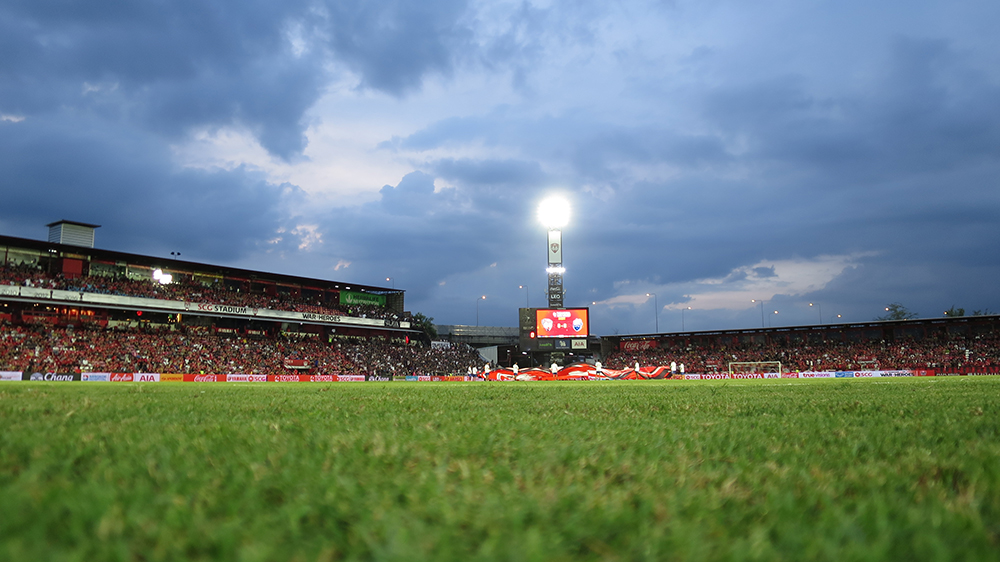
- The match took place at SCG Stadium.
- Event: 2019 Thai League Cup
Buriram United	PT Prachuap
1	1
- After extra time PT Prachuap won 8–7 on penalties
- Date: 28 September 2019
- Venue: SCG Stadium, Nonthaburi
- Man of the Match: Nattapong Khajohnmalee
- Referee: Mongkolchai Pechsri (Thailand)
- Attendance: 11,218
- Weather: Fair; 31 °C (88 °F) humidity 59%

The 2019 Thai League Cup final was the final match of the 2019 Thai League Cup, the 10th season in the second era of a Thailand's football tournament organised by Football Association of Thailand. It was played at the SCG Stadium in Nonthaburi, Thailand on 28 September 2019, between Buriram United a big team from the Northeastern part and PT Prachuap a big team from the Western part of Thailand.

== Road to the final ==
Buriram United (T1)		Round	PT Prachuap (T1)	
Opponent	Result	Knockout 1 leg	Opponent	Result
Rayong (T2)	4–1 (a.e.t.) (A)	Round of 32	Navy (T2)	2–0 (A)
JL Chiangmai United (T2)	2–1 (a.e.t.) (A)	Round of 16	Thonburi University (T4)	3–1 (A)
Bangkok United (T1)	1–0 (a.e.t.) (A)	Quarter-finals	Police Tero (T2)	2–1 (H)
Nongbua Pitchaya (T2)	2–0 (N)	Semi-finals	Chiangrai United (T1)	3–3 (a.e.t.) (4–3 p) (N)

Note: In all results below, the score of the finalist is given first (H: home; A: away; T1: Clubs from Thai League 1; T2: Clubs from Thai League 2; T4: Clubs from Thai League 4.

== Match ==
=== Details ===
28 September 2019
19:00 UTC+7

Buriram United	1 – 1 (a.e.t.)	PT Prachuap
Supachai 74'	Report; News; Highlight; Full match	Maurinho 47'
Penalties
Andrés Túñez (penalty scored); Ratthanakorn Maikami (penalty scored); Suphanat Mueanta (penalty missed); Supachai Jaided (penalty scored); Suchao Nuchnum (penalty scored); Siwarak Tedsungnoen (penalty scored); Sasalak Haiprakhon (penalty scored); Hajime Hosogai (penalty scored); Korrakot Wiriyaudomsiri (penalty missed)	7 – 8	(penalty missed) Sompob Nilwong; (penalty scored) Adul Muensamaan; (penalty scored) Ratchapol Nawanno; (penalty scored) Artyom Filiposyan; (penalty scored) Phuritad Jarikanon; (penalty scored) Weerawut Kayem; (penalty scored) Sakunchai Saengthopho; (penalty scored) Amorn Thammanarm; (penalty scored) Seeket Madputeh

SCG Stadium, Nonthaburi
Attendance: 11,218
Referee: Mongkolchai Pechsri (Thailand)

Buriram United	PT Prachuap

Lineups:
GK	1	(Thailand) Siwarak Tedsungnoen (c)
RB	15	(Thailand) Narubadin Weerawatnodom			(substituted off) 63'
CB	3	(Thailand) Pansa Hemviboon
CB	5	(Venezuela) Andrés Túñez
LB	11	(Thailand) Korrakot Wiriyaudomsiri
DM	7	(Japan) Hajime Hosogai		(yellow card) 44'
CM	6	(Thailand) Sasalak Haiprakhon
CM	26	(Thailand) Ratthanakorn Maikami
CM	19	(Thailand) Supachok Sarachat		(yellow card) 89'
AM	9	(Thailand) Supachai Jaided	74'
CF	54	(Thailand) Suphanat Mueanta
Substitutes:
GK	26	(Thailand) Yotsapon Teangdar
DF	18	(Thailand) Apiwat Ngaolamhin
MF	8	(Thailand) Suchao Nuchnum			(substituted on) 63'
MF	62	(Thailand) Airfan Doloh
FW	20	(Sweden) Rasmus Jönsson
FW	39	(Netherlands) Nacer Barazite
Head Coach:
(Montenegro) Božidar Bandović

Lineups:
GK	13	(Thailand) Nattapong Khajohnmalee
RB	15	(Thailand) Seeket Madputeh
CB	16	(Uzbekistan) Artyom Filiposyan
CB	22	(Montenegro) Adnan Orahovac		(yellow card) 114'
LB	25	(Thailand) Adul Muensamaan (c)		(yellow card) 86'
DM	8	(Thailand) Phuritad Jarikanon
DM	2	(Thailand) Ratchapol Nawanno
CM	30	(Brazil) Maurinho	47'
CM	23	(Thailand) Phanuwat Jinta			(substituted off) 64'
CM	35	(Thailand) Siroch Chatthong			(substituted off) 76'
CF	9	(Thailand) Supot Jodjam		(yellow card) 27'	(substituted off) 83'
Substitutes:
GK	78	(Thailand) Hatsachai Sankla
DF	3	(Thailand) Sompob Nilwong
DF	33	(Thailand) Weerawut Kayem			(substituted on) 83'
DF	87	(Thailand) Saranyu Intarach
DF	99	(Thailand) Piyachart Tamaphan
MF	31	(Thailand) Wanchalerm Yingyong
MF	36	(Thailand) Sakunchai Saengthopho		(yellow card) 90'	(substituted on) 76'
FW	17	(Thailand) Amorn Thammanarm			(substituted on) 64'
FW	19	(Thailand) Rawi Udomsin
Head Coach:
(Thailand) Thawatchai Damrong-Ongtrakul

Assistant referees:
(Thailand) Chotrawee Tongduang
(Thailand) Chaowalit Poonprasit
Fourth official:
(Thailand) Sarayut Jakngoen
Match Commissioner:
(Thailand) Akom Smuthkochorn
Referee Assessor:
(Thailand) Praew Semaksuk
General Coordinator
(Thailand) Woravit Sirirastakool

MATCH RULES

- 90 minutes.
- 30 minutes extra-time if necessary.
- Penalty shoot-out if still necessary.
- Maximum of four substitutions (3 in full time and 1 in extra time).

== Winner ==
2019 Thai League Cup
Winners
PT Prachuap
First Title

=== Prizes for winner ===
- A champion trophy.
- 5,000,000 THB prize money.

=== Prizes for runners-up ===
- 1,000,000 THB prize money.

== See also ==
- 2019 Thai League 1
- 2019 Thai League 2
- 2019 Thai League 3
- 2019 Thai League 4
- 2019 Thai FA Cup
- 2019 Thai League Cup
