= 2022 Thai League Cup final =

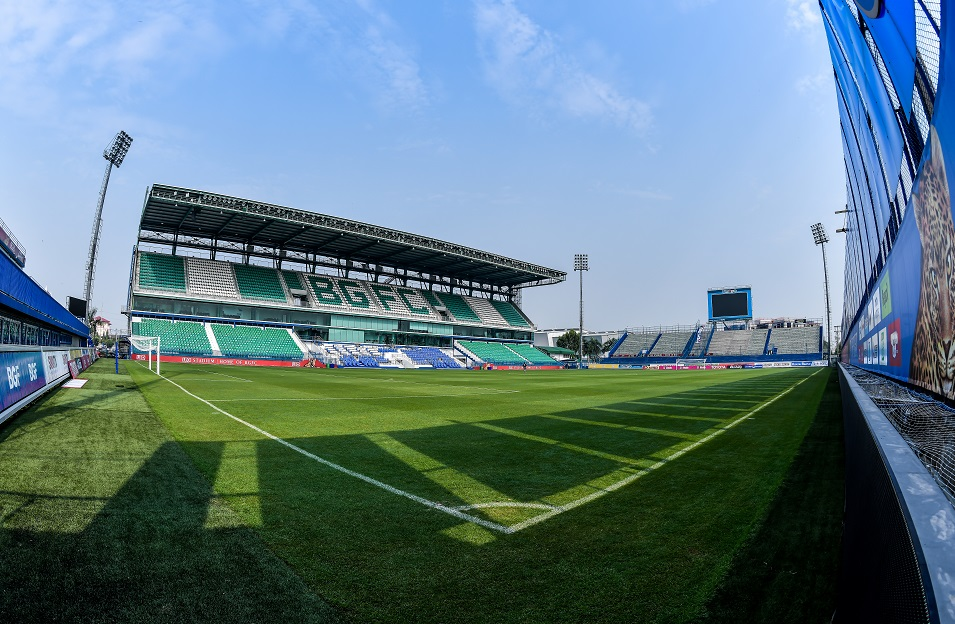
- The match took place at BG Stadium.
- Event: 2021–22 Thai League Cup
PT Prachuap	Buriram United
0	4
- Date: 29 May 2022
- Venue: BG Stadium, Thanyaburi, Pathum Thani
- Man of the Match: Jonathan Bolingi
- Referee: Torphong Somsing (Thailand)
- Attendance: 7,628
- Weather: Partly cloudy 31 °C (88 °F) humidity 73%

The 2022 Thai League Cup final was the final match of the 2021–22 Thai League Cup, the 12th season in the second era of a Thailand's football tournament organised by Football Association of Thailand. It was played at the BG Stadium in Pathum Thani, Thailand on 29 May 2022, between PT Prachuap a big team from Prachuap Khiri Khan located in the Western part and Buriram United a big team from Buriram located in the Northeastern part of Thailand.

== Route to the final ==
PT Prachuap (T1)			Round	Buriram United (T1)		
Opponent	Result		Knockout 1 leg	Opponent	Result	
Lamphun Warriors (T2)	2–1 (a.e.t.) (A)	Highlight	Round of 32	Rayong (T2)	2–0 (A)	Highlight
Chainat Hornbill (T2)	3–1 (A)	Highlight	Round of 16	Samut Prakan City (T1)	4–1 (H)	Highlight
Uthai Thani (T3)	2–1 (H)	Highlight	Quarter-finals	Ratchaburi Mitr Phol (T1)	2–0 (A)	Highlight
Chonburi (T1)	1–0 (N)	Highlight	Semi-finals	Chiangrai United (T1)	1–0 (N)	Highlight

Note: In all results below, the score of the finalist is given first (H: home; A: away; T1: Clubs from Thai League 1; T2: Clubs from Thai League 2; T3: Clubs from Thai League 3.

== Match ==
=== Details ===
29 May 2022
18:00 UTC+7

PT Prachuap	0–4	Buriram United
	Report; Highlight; Full match Ceremony	Jonathan Bolingi 35', 61'; Peeradon Chamratsamee 90'; Suphanat Mueanta 90+1'

BG Stadium,
Thanyaburi, Pathum Thani
Attendance: 7,628
Referee: Torphong Somsing (Thailand)

PT Prachuap	Buriram United

Lineups:
GK	49	(Thailand) Jirunpong Thammasiha
RB	87	(Thailand) Saranyu Intarach		(substituted off) 62'
CB	8	(Thailand) Praweenwat Boonyong
CB	14	(Thailand) Peerawat Akkratum
LB	11	(Thailand) Saharat Pongsuwan	(red card) 69'
CM	32	(Thailand) Ratchapol Nawanno		(substituted off) 72'
DM	31	(Thailand) Wanchalerm Yingyong
CM	35	(Thailand) Saharat Panmarchya	(yellow card) 33'	(substituted off) 62'
RF	18	(Thailand) Apichart Denman		(substituted off) 72'
CF	29	(Brazil) Willen (c)
LF	9	(Lebanon) Soony Saad		(substituted off) 82'
Substitutes:
GK	26	(Thailand) Kwanchai Suklom
DF	2	(Thailand) Thitawee Aksornsri		(substituted on) 62'
DF	5	(Thailand) Eakkanut Kongket
DF	6	(Thailand) Nukoolkit Krutyai
DF	15	(Thailand) Seeket Madputeh		(substituted on) 82'
MF	13	(Philippines) Patrick Reichelt		(substituted on) 72'
MF	19	(Thailand) Thirayu Banhan		(substituted on) 62'
FW	7	(Brazil) Tauã Ferreira dos Santos		(substituted on) 72'
FW	41	(Thailand) Thanin Plodkeaw
Head Coach:
(Thailand) Issara Sritaro

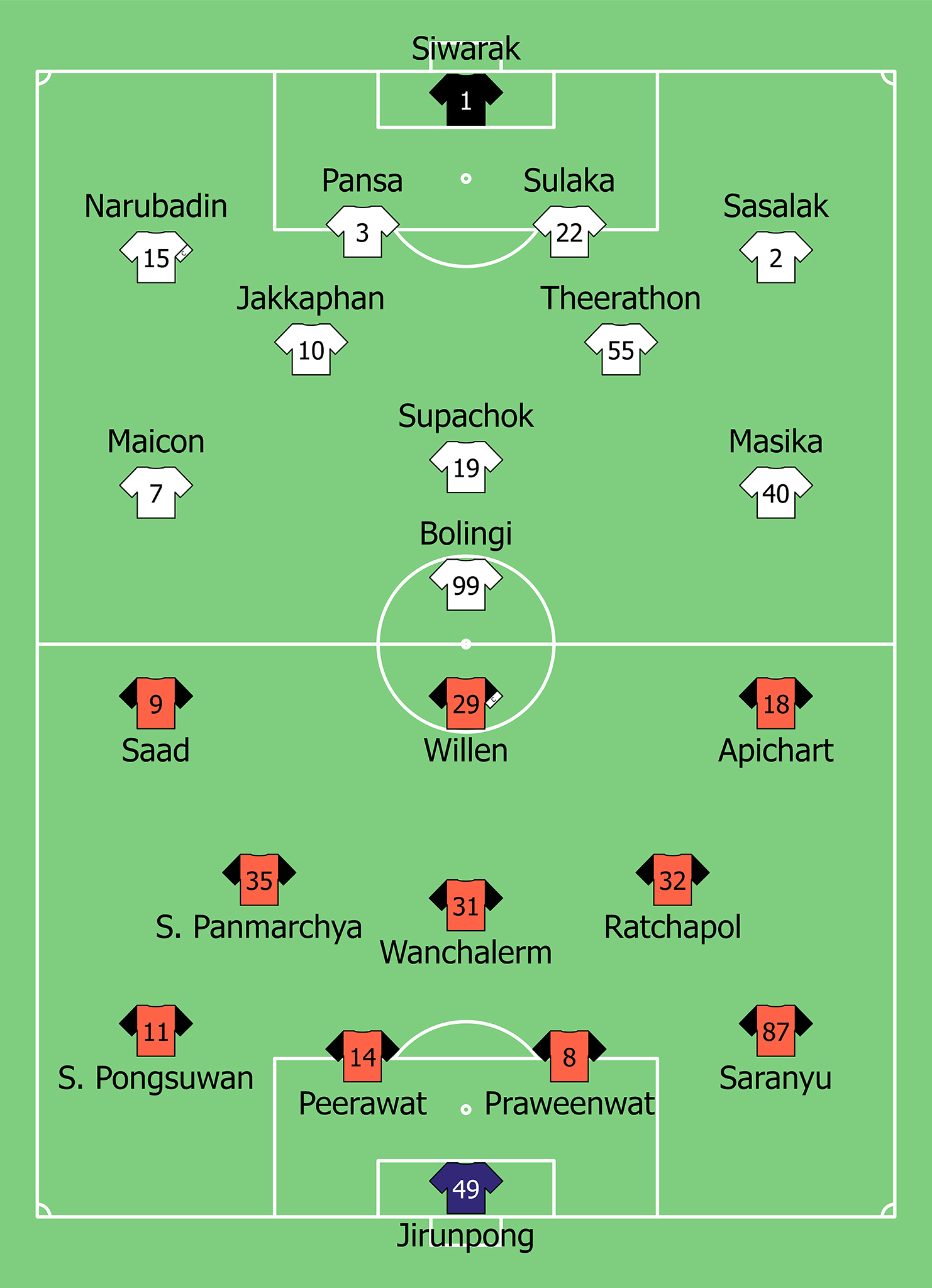

Lineups:
GK	1	(Thailand) Siwarak Tedsungnoen
RB	15	(Thailand) Narubadin Weerawatnodom (c)			(substituted off) 71'
CB	3	(Thailand) Pansa Hemviboon
CB	22	(Iraq) Rebin Sulaka
LB	2	(Thailand) Sasalak Haiprakhon
DM	10	(Thailand) Jakkaphan Kaewprom			(substituted off) 82'
DM	55	(Thailand) Theerathon Bunmathan		(yellow card) 55'
RM	7	(Brazil) Maicon
AM	19	(Thailand) Supachok Sarachat
LM	40	(Kenya) Ayub Masika			(substituted off) 78'
CF	99	(Democratic Republic of the Congo) Jonathan Bolingi	35', 61'	(yellow card) 54'
Substitutes:
GK	59	(Thailand) Nopphon Lakhonphon
DF	4	(Thailand) Piyaphon Phanichakul
DF	18	(Thailand) Apiwat Ngaolamhin
MF	5	(Thailand) Peeradon Chamratsamee	90'		(substituted on) 82'
MF	8	(Thailand) Ratthanakorn Maikami			(substituted on) 71'
MF	11	(Thailand) Chutipol Thongthae
MF	17	(Thailand) Chakkit Laptrakul
FW	9	(Thailand) Supachai Chaided
FW	54	(Thailand) Suphanat Mueanta	90+1'		(substituted on) 78'
Head Coach:
(Japan) Masatada Ishii

Assistant referees:
(Thailand) Pattarapong Kijsathit
(Thailand) Apichit Nophuan
Fourth official:
(Thailand) Noppadet Mangngam
Assistant VAR:
(Thailand) Warintron Sassadee
(Thailand) Kitisak Pikunngoen
Match Commissioner:
(Thailand) Kraisorn Phanpean
Referee Assessor:
(Thailand) Mongkol Rungklay
General Coordinator:
(Thailand) Nattaphong Phukcharoen

MATCH RULES

- 90 minutes.
- 30 minutes extra-time if necessary.
- Penalty shoot-out if still necessary.
- Maximum of 5 substitutions.

=== Statistics ===
First half
Statistic	PT Prachuap	Buriram United
Goals scored	0	1
Total shots	2	6
Shots on target	1	2
Saves	1	1
Ball possession	40%	60%
Total passes	171	269
Corner kicks	1	3
Fouls committed	5	10
Offsides	0	0
Yellow cards	1	0
Red cards	0	0

Second half
Statistic	PT Prachuap	Buriram United
Goals scored	0	3
Total shots	1	9
Shots on target	0	5
Saves	2	0
Ball possession	41%	59%
Total passes	177	234
Corner kicks	0	2
Fouls committed	7	8
Offsides	1	2
Yellow cards	0	2
Red cards	1	0

Overall
Statistic	PT Prachuap	Buriram United
Goals scored	0	4
Total shots	3	15
Shots on target	1	7
Saves	3	1
Ball possession	41%	59%
Total passes	348	503
Corner kicks	1	5
Fouls committed	12	18
Offsides	1	2
Yellow cards	1	2
Red cards	1	0

== Winner ==
2021–22 Thai League Cup
Winners
Buriram United
Sixth Title

=== Prizes for winner ===
- A champion trophy.
- 5,000,000 THB prize money.

=== Prizes for runners-up ===
- 1,000,000 THB prize money.

== See also ==
- 2021–22 Thai League 1
- 2021–22 Thai League 2
- 2021–22 Thai League 3
- 2021–22 Thai FA Cup
- 2021–22 Thai League Cup
- 2021 Thailand Champions Cup
