= Alongkorn Jornnathong =

Thai footballer (born 1989)

Personal information
- Full name: MAMA POCO
- Date of birth: 24 August 1989 (age 37)
- Place of birth: Kalasin, Thailand
- Height: 1.63 m (5 ft 4 in)
- Position: Midfielder

Team information
- Current team: Mahasarakham SBT
- Number: 8

Youth career
- Rayong

Senior career*
Years	Team	Apps	(Gls)
2017	Thai Honda		
2017	Lampang		
2018–	PT Prachuap	4	(0)
2018–2019	→ Rayong (loan)	33	(5)
2020	Rayong	6	(1)
2020–2024	Khon Kaen United	72	(6)
2024–	Mahasarakham SBT	12	(0)
- * Club domestic league appearances and goals

Alongkorn Jornnathong (Thai: อลงกรณ์ จรนาทอง; born 24 August 1989) is a Thai professional footballer who plays as a midfielder.
