= Decha Sa-ardchom =

Thai footballer (born 1986)

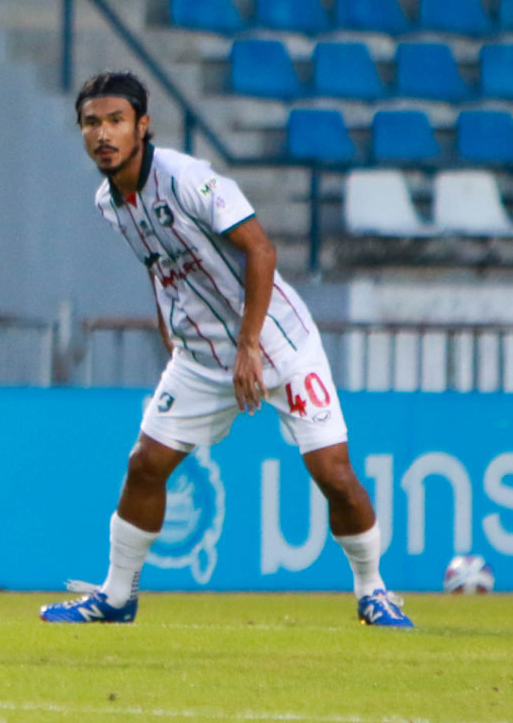
- Decha Sa-ardchom playing for Phrae United.

Personal information
- Full name: Decha Sa-ardchom
- Date of birth: 13 August 1986 (age 40)
- Place of birth: Chaiyaphum, Thailand
- Height: 1.80 m (5 ft 11 in)
- Position: Midfielder

Team information
- Current team: Muang Loei United
- Number: 40

Senior career*
Years	Team	Apps	(Gls)
2010	Police United	4	(0)
2012–2015	Suphanburi	62	(0)
2016	PTT Rayong	9	(0)
2016	Nakhon Ratchasima	10	(0)
2017	Thai Honda Ladkrabang	20	(2)
2017–2018	PT Prachuap	17	(0)
2019	Chiangrai United	8	(0)
2019	→ Chiangmai (loan)	8	(0)
2020	Rayong	2	(0)
2020	Sukhothai	15	(0)
2021–2022	Phrae United	17	(0)
2022	Samut Prakan City	8	(0)
2023–	Muang Loei United	7	(0)
- * Club domestic league appearances and goals as of 18 March 2023 (UTC)

Decha Sa-ardchom (Thai: เดชา สอาดโฉม, born 13 August 1986), simply known as Aof (Thai: อ๊อฟ), is a Thai professional footballer who plays for Muang Loei United in the Thai League 3 as a midfielder.
