= Nonthawat Rak-ok =

Thai footballer (born 1996)

Personal information
- Full name: Nonthawat Rak-ok
- Date of birth: 13 September 1996 (age 30)
- Place of birth: Samut Prakan, Thailand
- Height: 1.75 m (5 ft 9 in)
- Position: Attacking midfielder

Team information
- Current team: Kasetsart
- Number: 33

Senior career*
Years	Team	Apps	(Gls)
2017	Super Power Samut Prakan	12	(1)
2018	Prachuap	0	(0)
2019	Kasetsart	28	(3)
2020	Sukhothai	1	(0)
2020–2022	Chainat Hornbill	20	(0)
2022–	Kasetsart	19	(1)
- * Club domestic league appearances and goals as of 30 April 2023

Nonthawat Rak-ok (Thai: นนทวัฒน์ รักอก; born 13 September 1996) is a Thai professional footballer who plays as an attacking midfielder for Thai League 2 club Kasetsart.
