= Siriwat Chotiwecharak =

Thai footballer (born 1989)

Personal information
- Full name: Siriwat Chotiwecharak
- Date of birth: 4 July 1985 (age 41)
- Place of birth: Chai Nat, Thailand
- Height: 1.83 m (6 ft 0 in)
- Position: Defender

Team information
- Current team: Ayutthaya
- Number: 28

Senior career*
Years	Team	Apps	(Gls)
2013–2014	Bangkok United	11	(0)
2014	Sisaket	13	(0)
2015	Saraburi	18	(0)
2016	Air Force Central	19	(2)
2017	PT Prachuap	22	(0)
2018–	Ayutthaya	0	(0)
- * Club domestic league appearances and goals as of 27 September 2015

Siriwat Chotiwecharak (Thai ศิริวัฒน์ โชติเวชารักษ์, born 20 April 1989) is a Thai professional footballer.
