= Kwon Dae-hee =

South Korean footballer

Kwon Dae-hee 권대희
Personal information
- Full name: Kwon Dae-hee 권대희
- Date of birth: August 16, 1989 (age 37)
- Place of birth: Seoul, South Korea
- Height: 1.88 m (6 ft 2 in)
- Positions: Centre back; left back

Team information
- Current team: Sisaket United
- Number: 3

Senior career*
| Years | Team | Apps | (Gls) |
| 2013 | Rayong United | 11 | (0) |
| 2014 | Bangkok | 32 | (2) |
| 2015–2018 | PT Prachuap | 96 | (11) |
| 2019–2021 | Police Tero | 63 | (5) |
| 2021–2022 | Lamphun Warrior | 32 | (1) |
| 2022–2023 | PT Prachuap | 27 | (0) |
| 2023–2024 | Nakhon Si United | 35 | (1) |
| 2025 | Chonburi | 16 | (1) |
| 2025– | Sisaket United | 0 | (0) |
- * Club domestic league appearances and goals as of 26 April 2025

- Kwon Dae-hee
- Hangul: 권대희
- Hanja: 權大熙
- RR: Gwon Daehui
- MR: Kwŏn Taehŭi

Kwon Dae-hee (Korean: 권대희, Korean pronunciation: [kwʌn.dɛ̝.ɦi] or [kwʌn] [tɛ̝.ɦi], born 16 August 1989) is a South Korean professional footballer who plays as a centre back or a left back for Thai League 2 club Sisaket United.

He start his football career in Thailand in 2013, after finishing military service in South Korea, with Rayong United in Division 1. He was recognized for his strength and aerial skills. His former manager Pairoj Borwonwatanadilok once called him "the best center-back in Thai Division 1".

== Biography ==
Kwon was born in Seoul, South Korea. He never had an experience in professional football career ever since joining Rayong United in 2013.

== Club career ==
=== Rayong United ===
In 2013, after he finished military service in South Korea, Kwon was flown to Thailand for a trial with Thai League 2 club Rayong United. He was impressed by club head coach and agreed a permanent deal on second-leg spell until end of season.

=== Bangkok ===
In following season, after he left Rayong-based club, he re-located to Bangkok and signed for Bangkok for a 1-year deal. His manager Pairoj Borwonwatanadilok once called him "the best center-back in Thai Division 1 with strong defensive mind, strength and aerial ability".

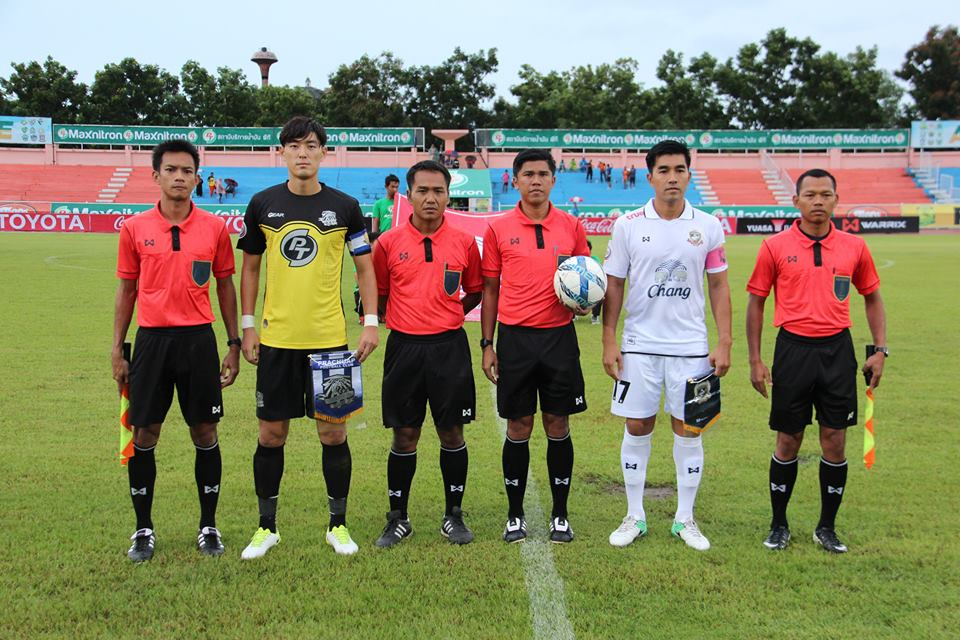
Kwon Daehee as captain in clash with Suphanburi

=== PT Prachuap ===
In season 2015, rumors tended to believe that Kwon started trial and training during pre-season with highly rated club, PT Prachuap. On 28 January 2015, Kwon signed for PT Prachuap on free transfer to fulfill club defensive line-up and foreign player quota.

In season 2017, Kwon played superbly for PT Prachuap as the heart of defensive team. He was assigned as "Team Captain" for a few matches during the season.

== Honours ==
Chonburi

- Thai League 2: 2024–25

Lamphun Warrior

- Thai League 2: 2021–22
