= Yai Nilwong =

Thai footballer and manager (born 1985)

Personal information
- Full name: Yai Nilwong
- Date of birth: 12 March 1985 (age 41)
- Place of birth: Kanchanaburi, Thailand
- Height: 1.67 m (5 ft 5 1/2 in)
- Position: Left winger

Youth career
- 2008: Rajnavy Rayong

Senior career*
Years	Team	Apps	(Gls)
2009	Rajnavy Rayong	17	(6)
2010	Thai Port	15	(2)
2011	TTM Phichit	23	(7)
2012	Esan United	12	(2)
2013	BEC Tero Sasana	4	(0)
2013	→ Bangkok United (loan)	12	(0)
2014–2017	Ratchaburi Mitr Phol	93	(6)
2017	→ Sisaket (loan)	10	(1)
2018	PT Prachuap	17	(1)
2019	Sisaket	10	(2)
2019	Ayutthaya United	6	(0)
2020	Chiangrai City	2	(0)
2020–2021	Nakhon Si United	16	(2)
2022	MH Nakhon Si City	0	(0)
2023	DP Kanchanaburi	0	(0)
Total		237	(29)

Managerial career
- 2021–2022: MH Khon Surat City
- 2022: MH Nakhon Si City
- 2022–2023: Dragon Pathumwan Kanchanaburi
- 2023–2024: Samut Sakhon City
- 2025–: Saraburi United
- * Club domestic league appearances and goals as of 20 May 2023

Yai Nilwong (Thai: ใหญ่ นิลวงศ์, born 12 March 1985) is a Thai football manager and former professional football player, who is the head coach of Thai League 3 club Saraburi United.

== Personal life ==
Yai's brother Sompob Nilwong is also a footballer and plays as a center back.

== Honours ==
=== Club ===
Thai Port

- Thai League Cup (1): 2010

Dragon Pathumwan Kanchanaburi

- Thai League 3 Western Region (1): 2022–23
