= Kritsananon Srisuwan =

Thai footballer (born 1995)

Personal information
- Date of birth: 11 January 1995 (age 31)
- Place of birth: Nakhon Ratchasima, Thailand
- Height: 1.75 m (5 ft 9 in)
- Position: Midfielder

Team information
- Current team: Ratchaburi Mitr Phol
- Number: 37

Youth career
- 2013–2015: Nakhon Ratchasima Sport School

Senior career*
Years	Team	Apps	(Gls)
2016–2017	Bangkok	21	(4)
2017–	Ratchaburi Mitr Phol	174	(2)
2018	→ PT Prachuap (loan)	27	(1)
- * Club domestic league appearances and goals as of 9 January 2026

Kritsananon Srisuwan (Thai: กฤษณนน ศรีสุวรรณ, born January 11, 1995), is a Thai professional footballer who plays as a midfielder for Thai League 1 club Ratchaburi F.C.
