= Adisak Ganu =

Thai footballer (born 1986)

Personal information
- Full name: Adisak Ganu
- Date of birth: 1 January 1986 (age 40)
- Place of birth: Satun, Thailand
- Height: 1.78 m (5 ft 10 in)
- Positions: Right winger; attacking midfielder

Youth career
- 2006: Chula United

Senior career*
Years	Team	Apps	(Gls)
2007–2012	BBCU	116	(10)
2013	Suphanburi	18	(1)
2014–2016	Osotspa Samut Prakan	34	(3)
2016–2017	Chiangmai	32	(4)
2017	→ Khonkaen (loan)	12	(2)
2018	PT Prachuap	2	(0)
2019	Kasetsart	31	(1)
2020–2022	MOF Customs United	59	(1)
2022–2023	Songkhla	23	(1)
2023	Pattani	5	(2)
2023–2024	PT Satun	19	(0)
- * Club domestic league appearances and goals as of 7 November 2024

Adisak Ganu (Thai: อดิศักดิ์ กานู; born 1 January 1986) is a Thai professional footballer.

== Honours ==
=== Club ===
Songkhla

- Thai League 3 Southern Region: 2022–23
