= Chanintorn Pohirun =

Thai footballer (born 1990)

Personal information
- Date of birth: 1 June 1990 (age 36)
- Place of birth: Thailand
- Height: 1.74 m (5 ft 9 in)
- Position: Attacking midfielder

Team information
- Current team: Kasetsart
- Number: 8

Senior career*
Years	Team	Apps	(Gls)
2018	PT Prachuap	4	(0)
2019	Lampang		
2019	Police Tero		
2020–	Kasetsart		
- * Club domestic league appearances and goals

Chanintorn Pohirun (born June 1, 1990) is a Thai professional footballer who plays as an attacking-midfielder for Thai League 2 club Kasetsart.
