= Weerawut Kayem =

Thai footballer (born 1993)

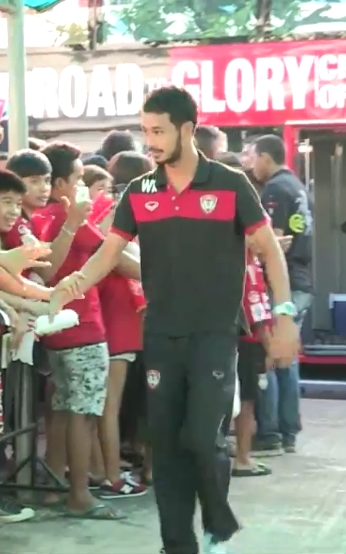
- Weerawut Kayem with Muangthong United in 2013

Personal information
- Full name: Weerawut Kayem
- Date of birth: 23 March 1993 (age 33)
- Place of birth: Songkhla, Thailand
- Height: 1.78 m (5 ft 10 in)
- Position: Left back

Youth career
- 2005–2009: JMG Academy
- 2010: Muangthong United

Senior career*
Years	Team	Apps	(Gls)
2010–2019	Muangthong United	55	(2)
2015–2016	→ PTT Rayong (loan)	32	(4)
2017	→ BEC Tero Sasana (loan)	30	(3)
2018	→ Udon Thani (loan)	13	(2)
2019	→ PT Prachuap (loan)	11	(0)
2020–2021	PT Prachuap	23	(1)
2022	Suphanburi	9	(1)
2022–2023	Nakhon Si United	22	(5)
2024	Krabi	17	(2)
2024–2025	Pattaya United	30	(3)
2026	Phrae United	12	(0)

International career^{‡}
2011	Thailand U19	6	(0)
2011	Thailand U23	3	(0)
2012–2013	Thailand	6	(0)
- * Club domestic league appearances and goals as of 27 April 2024 ‡ National team caps and goals as of 23 September 2010

Weerawut Kayem (Thai: วีระวุฒิ กาเหย็ม; 23 March 1993) is a Thai professional footballer for Chanthaburi in the Thai League 2.

== International ==
Kayem has been called up to the Thai National Pre-Olympic Squad for the Olympics 2012 Game qualification matches. Weerawut Kayem received a call to the Thai National team and played his first match against Laos national football team on 9 December 2012.

== Honours ==
=== Club ===
Muangthong United

- Thai League 1 (1) : 2010, 2012

PT Prachuap

- Thai League Cup (1) : 2019
