= Selwan Al-Jaberi =

Iraqi footballer

Personal information
- Full name: Selwan Sinan Chasib Al-Jaberi
- Date of birth: 4 May 1991 (age 35)
- Place of birth: Stockholm, Sweden
- Height: 1.88 m (6 ft 2 in)
- Position: Forward

Team information
- Current team: Chainat Hornbill
- Number: 11

Youth career
- Lund

Senior career*
Years	Team	Apps	(Gls)
–2012	GIF Nike		
2012–2013	Eslöv		
2013–2014	Staffanstorp		
2014–2016	BW 90		
2016–2017	Ånge		
2017–2018	Södertälje		
2018–2019	Haninge		
2019	Linköping City		
2019	Bangkok	11	(5)
2019–2020	Kasem Bundit	13	(4)
2020	Kelantan United	0	(0)
2020–2021	Ranong United	15	(8)
2021–2022	Lampang	1	(0)
2022	Persela Lamongan	13	(1)
2022	Al-Hudood	0	(0)
2023	Ranong United	13	(2)
2023	Phuket Andaman	7	(1)
2024	Phitsanulok Unity	14	(7)
2024	Muang Loei United	7	(3)
2024–2025	Chainat Hornbill	8	(2)

International career
2013	Iraq U23	4	(0)
- * Club domestic league appearances and goals

Selwan Sinan Chasib Al-Jaberi (Arabic: سِلْوَان سِنَان چَاسِب الْجَابِرِيّ; born 4 May 1991) is a professional footballer who plays as a forward for Thai League 2 club Chainat Hornbill. Born in Sweden, he has represented Iraq at youth level.

== Club career ==
=== Lampang F.C. ===
On the 2021 season, he signed for Thai League 2 club Lampang. He made his league debut on 4 September 2021 in a match against Muangkan United.

=== Persela Lamongan ===
In 2022, Selwan signed a contract with Indonesian Liga 1 club Persela Lamongan. He made his league debut on 15 January 2022 in a match against Persija Jakarta at the Kapten I Wayan Dipta Stadium, Gianyar.

=== Al-Hudood ===
In August 2022, Al-Jaberi signed for Al-Hudood, a team based in his country of origin, Iraq.
