= Jonatan Reis =

Brazilian footballer (born 1989)

Personal information
- Full name: Jonatan Ferreira Reis
- Date of birth: June 30, 1989 (age 37)
- Place of birth: Codó, Maranhão, Brazil
- Height: 1.85 m (6 ft 1 in)
- Position: Forward

Senior career*
Years	Team	Apps	(Gls)
2012	Guarani	4	(1)
2012–2013	Ipatinga	3	(0)
2013–2014	Boa Esporte	1	(0)
2014–2015	Mamoré	10	(0)
2014–2015	Gama	6	(4)
2015–2016	Anápolis	5	(0)
2016–2017	Kasetsart	36	(28)
2017	Nakhon Pathom United	0	(0)
2017–2018	→ PT Prachuap (loan)	33	(26)
2019	Suphanburi	28	(8)
2019	→ BG Pathum United	12	(7)
2020	Busan IPark	0	(0)
2020	Ermis Aradippou	1	(0)
2020-2021	Trat	21	(2)
2021–2022	Muangkan United	29	(12)
2022	Nongbua Pitchaya	6	(0)
2023	North Esporte Clube		
2023	Dhaka Abahani	0	(0)
- * Club domestic league appearances and goals as of 15 August 2023

Jonatan Ferreira Reis (born June 30, 1989) is a professional footballer who last played for Bangladesh Premier League club Abahani Limited Dhaka. Before joining Abahani, he played for North Esporte Clube in Campeonato Mineiro Módulo II, a second tier league of Minas Gerais, Brazil.

In 2017 Thai League 2, he played with Kasetsart FC. He was the top goalscorer of the league with 28 goals.

== Club career ==
=== Inside Home Country ===
Born in Codó, Maranhão, Brazil, Reis began his career in the Brazil football league system with Anápolis in the 2015–2016 season.

=== Kasetsart ===
Reis signed a one-year deal with Thai club, Kasetsart on 1 February 2017 on a free transfer after being released by Anápolis. He was the top goalscorer of league with 28 goals.

=== Nakorn Pathom United ===
In late 2017 season, Reis agreed a deal to move to Nakhon Pathom United in the following season. Nakhon Pathom United was administratively relegated to Thai League 4 by the FA Thailand as they could not provide official documents about club licensing on time.

=== PT Prachuap ===
In the 2018 season Reis was loaned out to PT Prachuap to play in Thai League 1.

== Honour ==
BG Pathum United

- Thai League 2: 2019

Individual

- Thai League 2 Top Scorer: 2017 (28 Goals)
