= Prasid Jantum =

Thai footballer (born 1995)

Personal information
- Full name: Prasid Jantum
- Date of birth: 30 April 1995 (age 31)
- Place of birth: Khon Kaen, Thailand
- Height: 1.73 m (5 ft 8 in)
- Position: Attacking midfielder

Team information
- Current team: PT Prachuap
- Number: 70

Youth career
- 2008–2012: Srisongkramwittaya School
- 2013: Suphanburi

Senior career*
Years	Team	Apps	(Gls)
2014–2021	Suphanburi	64	(2)
2015	→ Simork (loan)	21	(6)
2021–	PT Prachuap	65	(1)

International career
2014	Thailand U19		
2016	Thailand U23	1	(0)
- * Club domestic league appearances and goals

Prasid Jantum (Thai: ประสิทธิ์ จันทุม, born April 30, 1995) is a Thai professional footballer who plays as an attacking midfielder for Thai League 1 club PT Prachuap.

== International career ==
Prasid was part of Thailand U19's squad in the 2014 Hassanal Bolkiah Trophy.
