= Sompob Nilwong =

Thai footballer (born 1983)

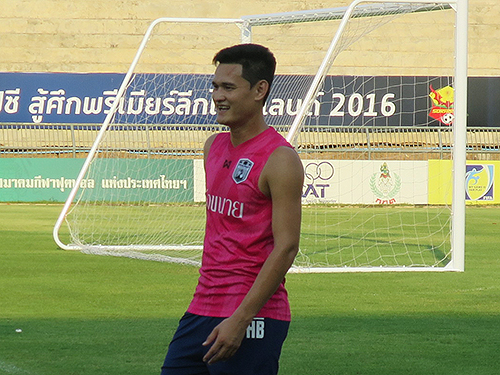

Personal information
- Full name: Sompob Nilwong
- Date of birth: 28 March 1983 (age 43)
- Place of birth: Kanchanaburi, Thailand
- Height: 1.84 m (6 ft 1/2 in)
- Position: Centre back

Senior career*
Years	Team	Apps	(Gls)
2005–2008	Rajnavy Rayong	64	(8)
2009–2012	Pattaya United	42	(2)
2013	Police United	25	(2)
2014	BEC Tero Sasana	15	(0)
2015–2016	Chainat Hornbill	42	(1)
2017–2020	PT Prachuap	39	(0)
2020–2021	Ayutthaya United	14	(0)
2021–2022	Pathumthani University	24	(4)
Total		265	(17)

International career
2012	Thailand	1	(0)
- * Club domestic league appearances and goals as of 10 April 2022

Sompob Nilwong (Thai: สมภพ นิลวงษ์, born March 28, 1983), simply known as Aek (Thai: เอก), is a Thai retired professional footballer who plays as a centre back.

== Personal life ==
Sompob's brother, Yai Nilwong, is also a footballer and plays for Ratchaburi as a left winger.

== International career ==
In 2012, Sompob was called up to the national team by Winfried Schäfer to the 2014 FIFA World Cup qualification – AFC third round.

=== International ===
As of 12 November 2015

National team	Year	Apps	Goals
Thailand	2012	1	0
Thailand	Total	1	0

== Honours ==
=== Club ===
BEC Tero Sasana

- Thai League Cup (1) : 2014

PT Prachuap FC

- Thai League Cup (1) : 2019
