= Pornsak Pongthong =

Thai footballer (born 1987)

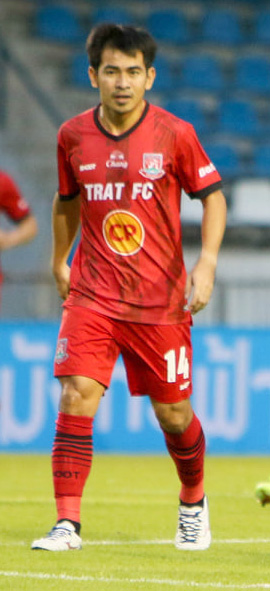

Personal information
- Full name: Pornsak Pongthong
- Date of birth: 9 May 1987 (age 39)
- Place of birth: Nakhon Phanom, Thailand
- Height: 1.66 m (5 ft 5 1/2 in)
- Position: Defensive midfielder

Team information
- Current team: Pattaya Dolphins United
- Number: 4

Youth career
- 2005–2006: Chonburi

Senior career*
Years	Team	Apps	(Gls)
2008–2013	Sriracha	51	(5)
2014	Songkhla United	32	(1)
2015–2017	PTT Rayong	24	(2)
2018	Chiangmai	0	(0)
2018	→ Chiangrai United (loan)	6	(0)
2018	Sisaket	0	(0)
2019	Chiangmai	11	(0)
2020–2022	Trat	63	(0)
2023–	Pattaya Dolphins United	17	(0)
- * Club domestic league appearances and goals as of 20 May 2023

Pornsak Pongthong (Thai: พรศักดิ์ ป้องทอง; born 9 May 1987) is a Thai professional footballer who plays for Pattaya Dolphins United in Thai League 3.

== Honours ==
=== Club ===
Sriracha

- Thai Division 1 League Champions (1): 2010

Pattaya Dolphins United

- Thai League 3 Eastern Region Champions (1): 2022–23
