= Hatsachai Sankla =

Thai footballer

Personal information
- Date of birth: 28 November 1991 (age 34)
- Place of birth: Buriram, Thailand
- Height: 1.77 m (5 ft 9 1/2 in)
- Position: Goalkeeper

Team information
- Current team: Pattaya Dolphins United
- Number: 78

Youth career
- Chonburi

Senior career*
Years	Team	Apps	(Gls)
2013	Huai Thalaeng		
2014	Pattaya United		
2016	Ayutthaya		
2017	Nakhon Pathom United		
2017–2021	PT Prachuap	1	(0)
2022–	Pattaya Dolphins United	14	(0)
- * Club domestic league appearances and goals as of 20 May 2023

Hatsachai Sankla (Thai: หัสชัย แสนกล้า, born November 28, 1991) is a Thai professional footballer who plays as a goalkeeper for Thai League 3 club Pattaya Dolphins United.

== Honour ==
=== Club ===
PT Prachuap FC

- Thai League Cup (1) : 2019

Pattaya Dolphins United

- Thai League 3 Eastern Region (1): 2022–23
