= Amorn Thammanarm =

Thai footballer (born 1983)

Personal information
- Full name: Amorn Thammanarm
- Date of birth: 16 October 1984 (age 42)
- Place of birth: Nakhon Ratchasima, Thailand
- Height: 1.74 m (5 ft 8 1/2 in)
- Position: Winger

Team information
- Current team: Police Tero (assistant)

Senior career*
Years	Team	Apps	(Gls)
2005–2008	Thai Airways	61	(22)
2009	Pattaya United	25	(1)
2010	Muangthong United	33	(2)
2010–2011	Suphanburi	53	(16)
2012–2014	BEC Tero Sasana	42	(7)
2014	→ PTT Rayong (loan)	16	(2)
2015	Navy	31	(3)
2016	Khonkaen United	20	(6)
2017–2021	PT Prachuap	74	(10)
2020–2021	→ MOF Customs United (loan)	0	(0)
Total		345	(68)

Managerial career
- 2024–2025: Police Tero (assistant)
- 2025: Bangkok (assistant)
- 2026–: Police Tero (assistant)
- 2026: Police Tero (caretaker)
- * Club domestic league appearances and goals as of 14:08, 28 March 2021 (UTC)

Amorn Thammanarm (Thai: อมร ธรรมนาม, born October 16, 1983) is a Thai football coach professional footballer and former player, who is the assistant coach of Thai League 2 club Police Tero.

== Honours ==
=== Clubs ===
Muangthong United

- Thai Premier League (1): 2010
- Kor Royal Cup (1): 2010

PT Prachuap

- Thai League Cup (1) : 2019
