= Eakkanut Kongket =

Thai footballer (born 1988)

Personal information
- Full name: Eakkanut Kongket
- Date of birth: 31 March 1988 (age 38)
- Place of birth: Ratchaburi, Thailand
- Height: 1.85 m (6 ft 1 in)
- Position: Right back

Senior career*
Years	Team	Apps	(Gls)
2011–2015	Prachuap		
2016–2017	Khon Kaen United		
2017–2021	Nakhon Ratchasima	91	(7)
2021–2023	PT Prachuap	46	(2)
2023–2024	Rajpracha	19	(4)
- * Club domestic league appearances and goals as of 3 March 2024

Eakkanut Kongket (Thai: เอกณัฏฐ์ คงเกตุ, born 31 March 1988) is a Thai professional footballer who plays as a right back.
