= Nattapong Khajohnmalee =

Thai footballer

Personal information
- Full name: Nattapong Khajohnmalee
- Date of birth: 11 February 1993 (age 33)
- Place of birth: Samut Prakan, Thailand
- Height: 1.88 m (6 ft 2 in)
- Position: Goalkeeper

Team information
- Current team: Bangkok
- Number: 1

Youth career
- 2006–2011: Debsirin School

Senior career*
Years	Team	Apps	(Gls)
2011–2015	Chamchuri United	23	(0)
2016–2018	Chainat Hornbill	9	(0)
2018	North Bangkok University	5	(0)
2019–2021	PT Prachuap	12	(0)
2021–2022	Nongbua Pitchaya	5	(0)
2022–2023	Sukhothai	1	(0)
2023	Phrae United	4	(0)
2023–2024	Chanthaburi	1	(0)
2024–2025	BG Pathum United	1	(0)
2025–	Bangkok	21	(0)
- * Club domestic league appearances and goals as of 22 March 2026

Nattapong Khajohnmalee (Thai: ณัฐพงษ์ ขจรมาลี, born May 5, 1994), is a Thai professional footballer who plays as a goalkeeper for Thai League 2 club Bangkok.

== Biography ==
On April 30, 2017, he had an accident. The car he sits on has collided with the end of the truck radically. He was taken to the hospital. Later, there was world-famous footballers, such as Kurt Zouma, Olivier Giroud, and Pierre-Emerick Aubameyang, who bid for a jersey to raise funds to help him.

== Honours ==
=== Club ===
PT Prachuap

- Thai League Cup (1): 2019
