= Saharat Panmarchya =

Thai footballer (born 1998)

Personal information
- Full name: Saharat Panmarchya
- Date of birth: 1 March 1998 (age 28)
- Place of birth: Lamphun, Thailand
- Position: Midfielder

Team information
- Current team: Nongbua Pitchaya
- Number: 8

Senior career*
Years	Team	Apps	(Gls)
2018	Air Force Central	2	(0)
2018–2023	PT Prachuap	16	(0)
2019	→ Samut Sakhon (loan)	2	(0)
2020–2021	→ Muangkan United (loan)	19	(1)
2023–2025	Lampang	57	(3)
2025–	Nongbua Pitchaya	10	(1)
2026	→ Hougang United (loan)	11	(0)
- * Club domestic league appearances and goals as of 10 October 2026

Saharat Panmarchya (Thai: สหรัฐ ปั๋นมัชยา), born 3 July 1998) is a Thai professional footballer who plays as a midfielder for Thai League 2 club Nongbua Pitchaya.
