= Saharat Pongsuwan =

Thai footballer

Personal information
- Full name: Saharat Pongsuwan
- Date of birth: 11 June 1996 (age 30)
- Place of birth: Phangnga, Thailand
- Height: 1.80 m (5 ft 11 in)
- Position: Left back

Team information
- Current team: Rayong
- Number: 11

Youth career
- 2010–2014: Assumption College Sriracha

Senior career*
Years	Team	Apps	(Gls)
2014–2015	Phuket	12	(1)
2016–2023	BG Pathum United	60	(0)
2016–2017	→ Chiangmai (loan)	15	(0)
2021–2022	→ PT Prachuap (loan)	25	(3)
2023	→ PT Prachuap (loan)	12	(0)
2023–2025	PT Prachuap	29	(1)
2025–	Rayong	10	(0)

International career
2017–2018	Thailand U23	3	(0)
- * Club domestic league appearances and goals as of 9 January 2026

Saharat Pongsuwan (Thai: สหรัฐ ปองสุวรรณ, born 11 June 1996) is a Thai professional footballer who plays as a left back for Thai League 1 club Rayong.

== Honours ==
=== Club ===
BG Pathum United

- Thai League 1: 2020–21
- Thai League 2: 2019
- Thailand Champions Cup: 2022
