= Phuritad Jarikanon =

Thai footballer (born 1989)

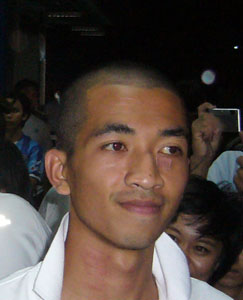

Personal information
- Date of birth: 1 August 1989 (age 37)
- Place of birth: Surat Thani, Thailand
- Height: 1.79 m (5 ft 10 1/2 in)
- Position: Defensive midfielder

Youth career
- 2004–2006: Chonburi

Senior career*
Years	Team	Apps	(Gls)
2007–2015	Chonburi	61	(4)
2009	→ Thai Airways (loan)	28	(11)
2012	→ Wuachon United (loan)	24	(3)
2013–2014	→ Bangkok Glass (loan)	42	(1)
2016	PTT Rayong	16	(4)
2017–2018	Ratchaburi Mitr Phol	23	(0)
2019	Samut Sakhon	3	(0)
2019–2021	PT Prachuap	10	(1)
2021	Muangkan United	0	(0)
Total		207	(24)

International career
2010	Thailand U23	3	(0)
2010–2013	Thailand	2	(0)
- * Club domestic league appearances and goals as of 19 November 2013

Phuritad Jarikanon (Thai: ภูริทัต จาริกานนท์, born August 1, 1989) is a Thai retired professional footballer who plays as a defensive midfielder.

== Honours ==
=== Club ===
- Kor Royal Cup 2009 Winner with Chonburi FC
- Thai FA Cup 2013 Runner-Up with Bangkok Glass
- Thai League Cup 2019 Winner with PT Prachuap F.C.
