= Prachuap Khiri Khan Province Stadium =

Thai stadium

Sam Ao Stadium
- สามอ่าว สเตเดียม
- "The Theater of Three Bays"
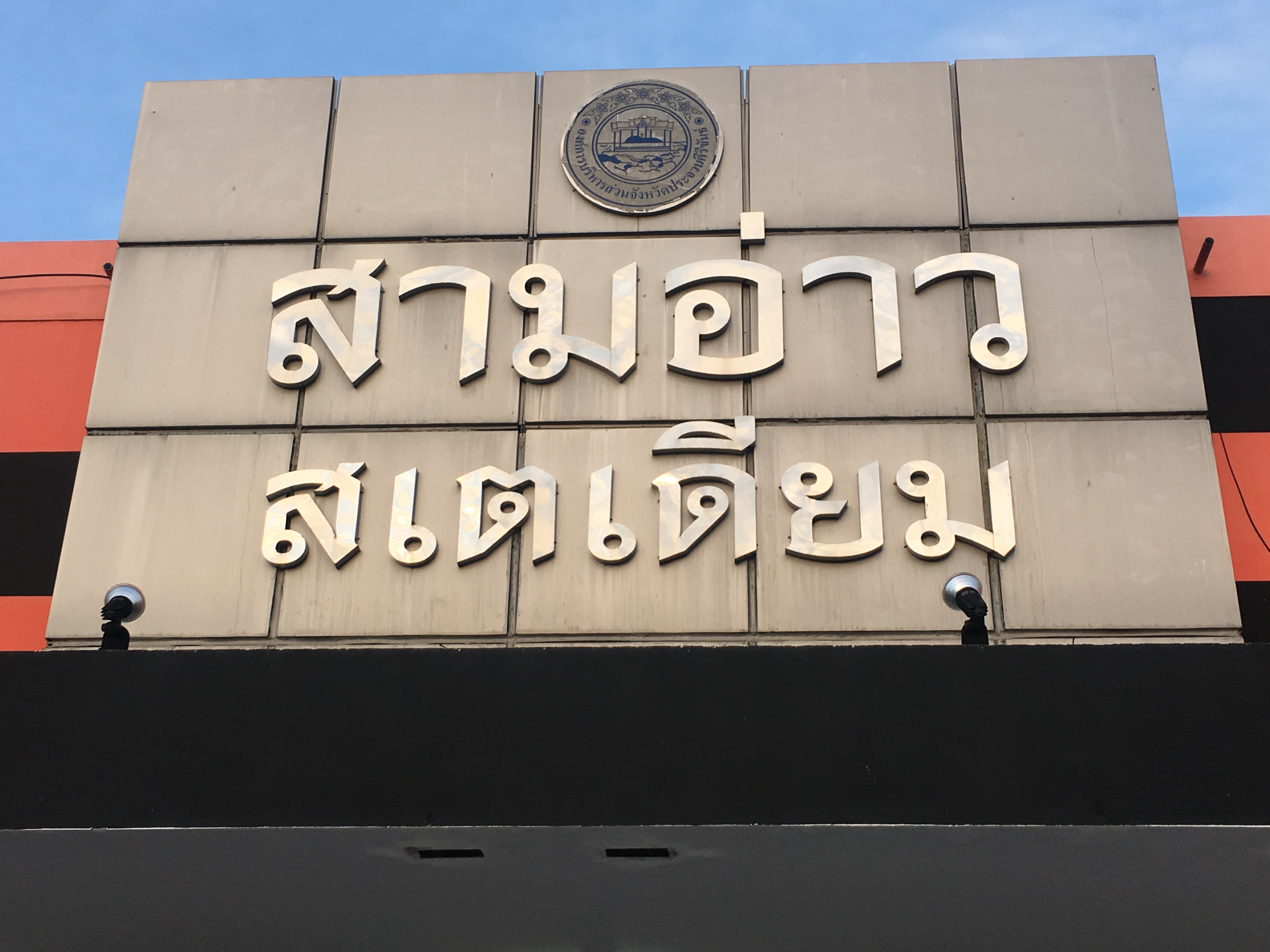
- Nameplate of Sam Ao Stadium
- Interactive map of Sam Ao Stadium
- Former names: Prachuap Khiri Khan Province Stadium
- Address: Google Maps
- Location: Mueang Prachuap Khiri Khan, Prachuap Khiri Khan, Thailand
- Coordinates: 11°49′03″N 99°47′17″E
- Owner: Prachuap Khiri Khan Provincial Administration Organization
- Operator: Prachuap Khiri Khan Provincial Administration Organization
- Seating type: Soft seat (Main stand only)
- Capacity: 5,000
- Type: Multi-purpose sport stadium
- Events: Sport and Athletics
- Surface: Grass
- Scoreboard: Digital type
- Field shape: Oval Rectangular

Construction
- Renovated: 2011

Tenant
- PT Prachuap F.C. (2009 - Present)

Prachuap Khiri Khan Province Stadium (Thai: สนามกีฬากลางจังหวัดประจวบคีรีขันธ์ หรือ สนามกีฬาสามอ่าว) (known as Sam Ao Stadium) is a multi-purpose stadium in Prachuap Khiri Khan Province, Thailand. It is currently used mostly for football matches and is the home stadium of Prachuap F.C. The stadium holds 5,000 people.

== Name ==
The Stadium is named after the famous seascape of district, with Prachuap Bay, Manao Bay, and Noii Bay. Three bay in Thai language pronounce as "Sam Ao" (Thai: สามอ่าว).

== Gallery ==
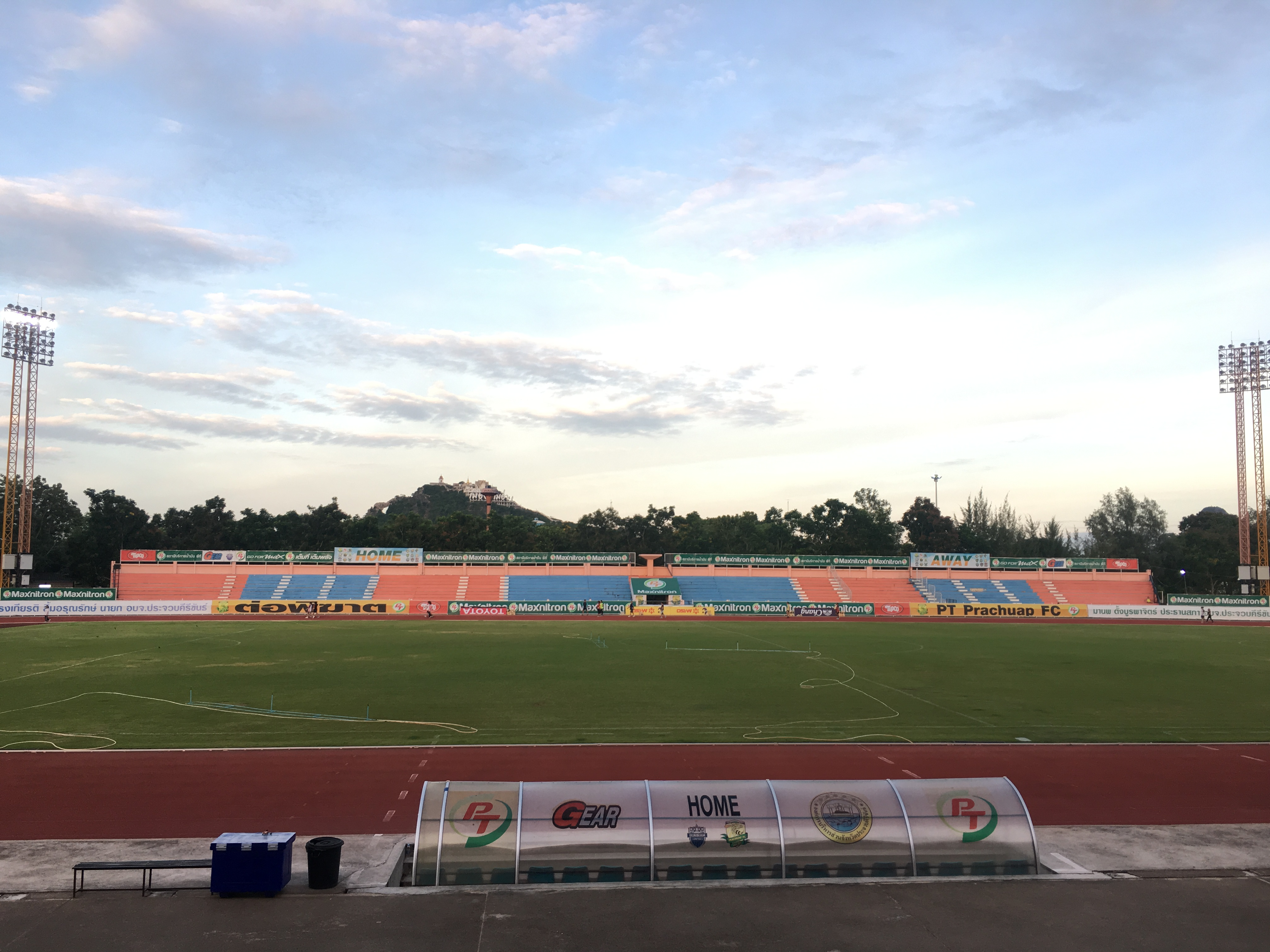
Sam Ao Stadium

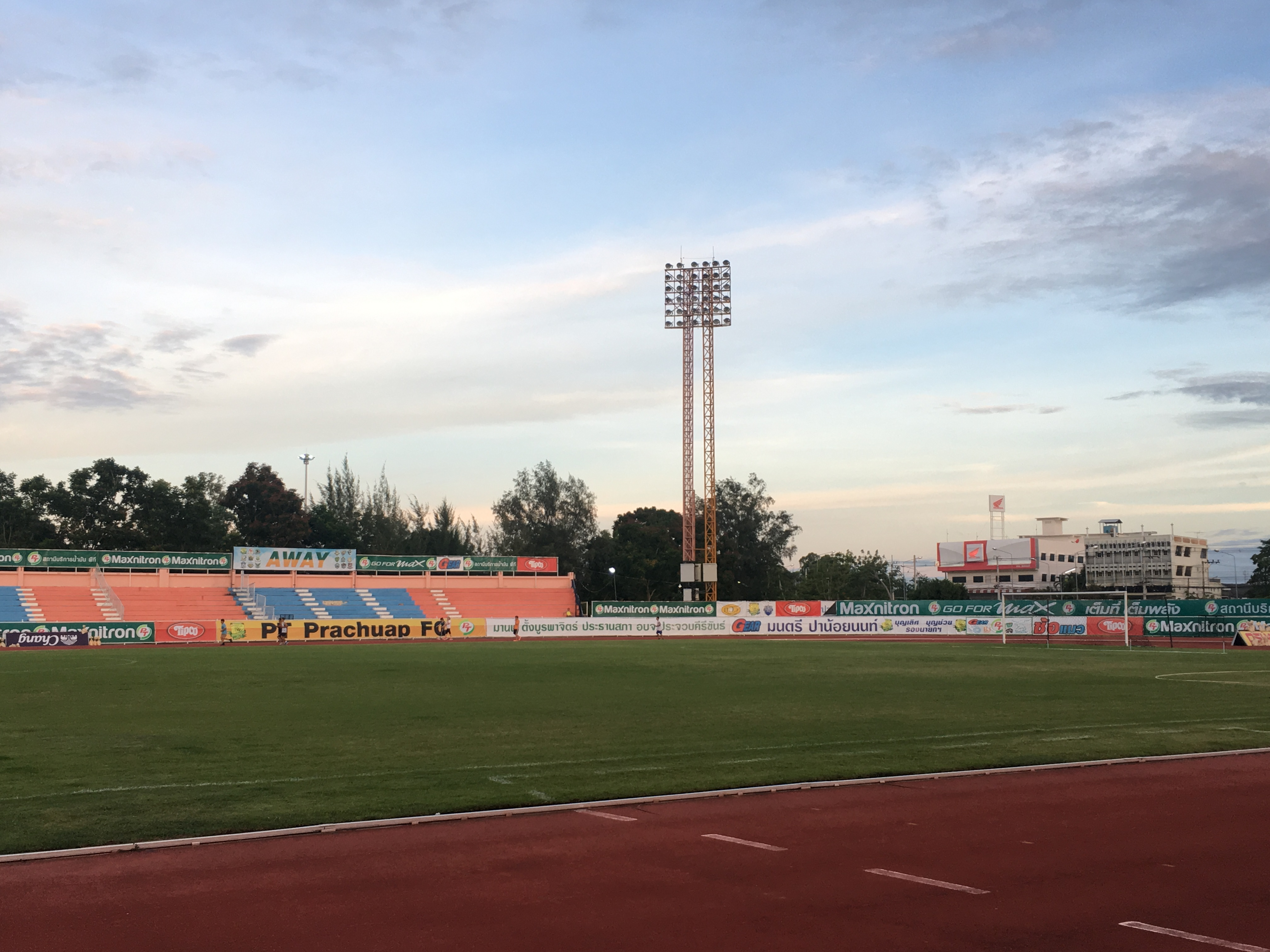
Away Zone Stand

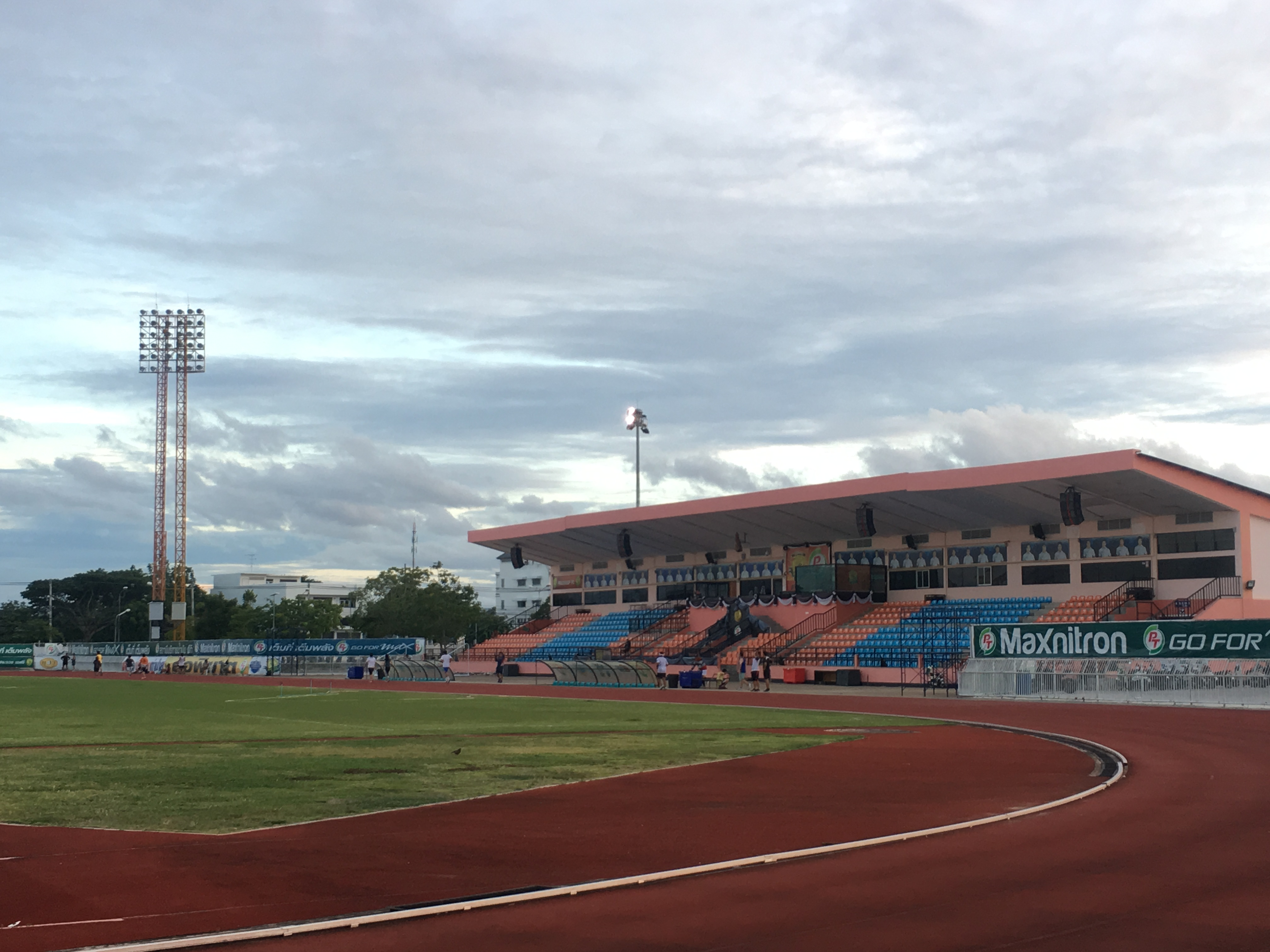
Mainstand of Sam Ao Stadium

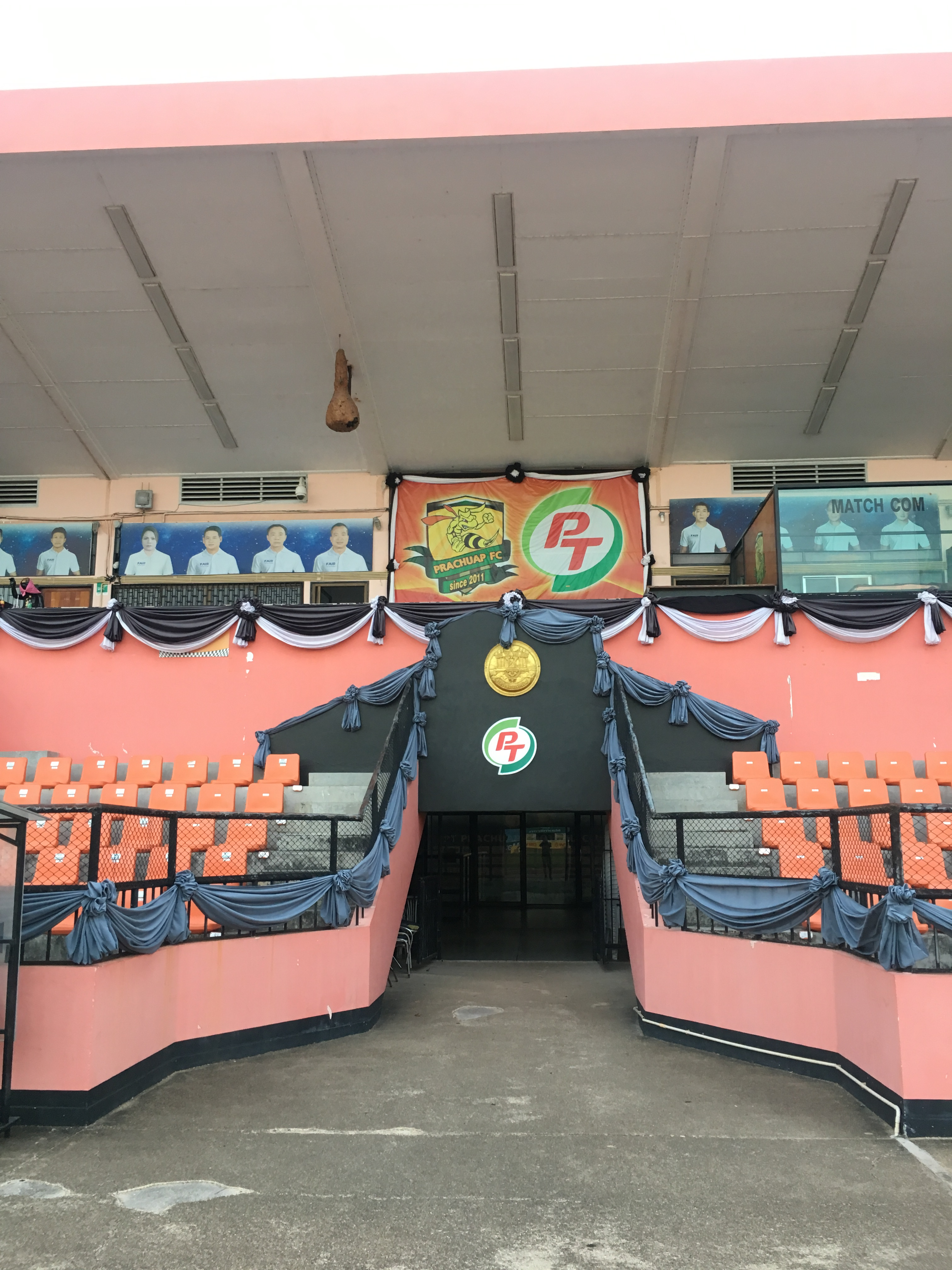
Main Entrance

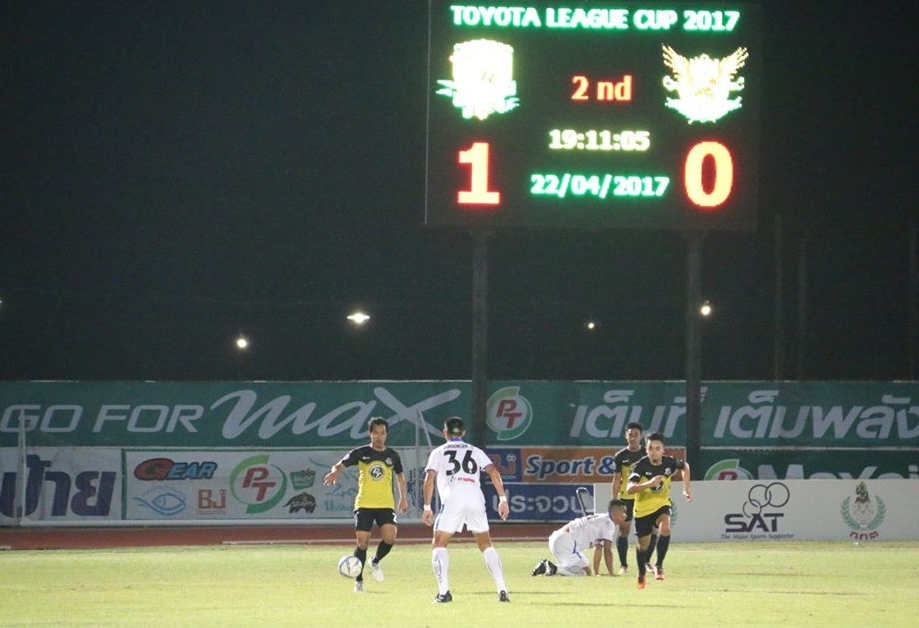
Digital Scoreboard in match between Krabi F.C. on 2017
