= Willen (footballer) =

Brazilian footballer (born 1992)

Personal information
- Full name: Willen Mota Inácio
- Date of birth: 10 January 1992 (age 34)
- Place of birth: Rio de Janeiro, Brazil
- Height: 1.84 m (6 ft 0 in)
- Position: Striker

Team information
- Current team: Lamphun Warriors
- Number: 29

Youth career
- 2003–2011: Vasco da Gama

Senior career*
Years	Team	Apps	(Gls)
2009–2014	Vasco da Gama	1	(0)
2012	→ Portimonense (loan)	2	(0)
2012	→ Assyriska (loan)	0	(0)
2013	→ Bangu (loan)	3	(1)
2013	→ América-RN (loan)	0	(0)
2014	→ Bangu (loan)	14	(4)
2014	Avaí	13	(1)
2015	Capivariano	2	(0)
2015	Portuguesa	9	(1)
2016	Songkhla United	17	(11)
2017	PT Prachuap	29	(18)
2018	Al-Batin	0	(0)
2018	Hajer	0	(0)
2019–2020	Sisaket	37	(18)
2020–2022	PT Prachuap	52	(29)
2022–2024	Bangkok United	43	(31)
2024	Port	12	(2)
2025	Água Santa	8	(2)
2025	Caxias	6	(2)
2025–	Lamphun Warriors	10	(2)

International career
2006–2007	Brazil U15		
2008–2009	Brazil U17		
- * Club domestic league appearances and goals as of 2 November 2025

Willen Mota Inácio (born 10 January 1992), simply known as Willen, is a Brazilian professional footballer who plays as a striker for Thai League 1 club Lamphun Warriors.

== Honours ==
Bangkok United

- Thailand Champions Cup: 2023
- Thai FA Cup: 2023–24

Individual

- Thai League 1 Best foreign player : 2023–24
- Thai League Best XI: 2023–24
