= Adnan Orahovac =

Montenegrin footballer

Personal information
- Full name: Adnan Orahovac
- Date of birth: 5 February 1991 (age 35)
- Place of birth: SR Montenegro, Yugoslavia
- Height: 1.91 m (6 ft 3 in)
- Position: Centre-back

Team information
- Current team: Budućnost
- Number: 55

Senior career*
| Years | Team | Apps | (Gls) |
| 2009–2014 | Budućnost Podgorica | 49 | (3) |
| 2013 | → Dečić (loan) | | |
| 2014–2015 | Jedinstvo Putevi | 15 | (0) |
| 2015–2017 | Pakhtakor Tashkent | 66 | (6) |
| 2017 | Dinamo Samarqand | 12 | (2) |
| 2018–2022 | PT Prachuap | 84 | (1) |
| 2022–2023 | Customs United | 36 | (1) |
| 2023– | Budućnost | 86 | (1) |
- * Club domestic league appearances and goals as of 17 June 2026 ‡ National team caps and goals as of 14 September 2017

Adnan Orahovac (Serbian Cyrillic: Аднан Ораховац) is a Montenegrin footballer playing for Budućnost. Besides Montenegro, he has played in Uzbekistan and Thailand.

== Club career ==
For FK Budućnost Podgorica, he scored his first goal to ensure a 2–1 victory over FK Mogren, endearing himself more to the fans.

In 2015, he signed for Pakhtakor Tashkent. His first cup goal for Pakhtakor came in a match in the first leg of the 2015 Uzbekistan Cup semifinals as an equalizer, but his club still lost.

In 2017, he signed for Dinamo Samarqand.

In 2018, he signed for PT Prachuap.

In 2022 Orahovac signed for Customs United

== Honours ==
PT Prachuap

- Thai League Cup: 2019
