= Apichart Denman =

Thai footballer (born 1997)

Personal information
- Full name: Apichart Hamza Denman
- Date of birth: 20 June 1997 (age 29)
- Place of birth: Satun, Thailand
- Height: 1.68 m (5 ft 6 in)
- Positions: Winger; forward

Team information
- Current team: Sukhothai
- Number: 21

Youth career
- 2014: Satun United

Senior career*
Years	Team	Apps	(Gls)
2014–2015	Satun United	6	(0)
2016	Phang Nga	19	(4)
2017	Phuket	14	(2)
2018–2019	Buriram United	0	(0)
2018–2019	→ PT Prachuap (loan)	36	(0)
2020–2024	PT Prachuap	105	(7)
2020	→ Krabi (loan)	11	(5)
2024–2025	Sukhothai	28	(1)
- * Club domestic league appearances and goals

Apichart Denman (Thai: อภิชาติ เด็นหมาน, born 20 July 1997) is a Thai professional footballer who plays as a winger or a forward for Thai League 1 club Sukhothai.
