= Adun Muensamaan =

Thai footballer (born 1981)

Personal information
- Full name: Adun Muensamaan
- Date of birth: 17 November 1981 (age 44)
- Place of birth: Satun, Thailand
- Height: 1.75 m (5 ft 9 in)
- Position: Left back

Youth career
- 2001–2004: Chulalongkorn University

Senior career*
Years	Team	Apps	(Gls)
2005–2007	TOT	34	(2)
2007–2012	Chula United	105	(8)
2013–2015	Police United	56	(2)
2016	Chamchuri United	19	(0)
2017–2022	PT Prachuap	65	(1)
2022–2023	Songkhla	12	(0)
2023	Pattani	7	(0)
2023	PT Satun	5	(0)
Total		303	(13)

Managerial career
- 2024: PT Satun
- 2025–: Yala
- * Club domestic league appearances and goals as of 7 November 2023

Adun Muensamaan (Thai: อดุลย์ หมื่นสมาน, born 17 November 1981) is a former professional footballer from Thailand.

Adun was born in Satun province and previously played for TOT, Police United and Chula United.

== Honours ==
=== Club ===
PT Prachuap FC

- Thai League Cup (1) : 2019

Songkhla

- Thai League 3 Southern Region (1) : 2022–23
