= Kwanchai Suklom =

Thai footballer (born 1995)

Personal information
- Full name: Kwanchai Suklom
- Date of birth: 12 January 1995 (age 31)
- Place of birth: Buriram, Thailand
- Height: 1.77 m (5 ft 9 1/2 in)
- Position: Goalkeeper

Team information
- Current team: Lamphun Warriors
- Number: 26

Youth career
- 2011–2013: Buriram United

Senior career*
| Years | Team | Apps | (Gls) |
| 2014–2019 | Buriram United | 1 | (0) |
| 2014 | → Surin City (loan) | 16 | (0) |
| 2016 | → Nakhon Pathom United (loan) | 10 | (0) |
| 2017 | → PT Prachuap (loan) | 17 | (0) |
| 2018–2019 | → PT Prachuap (loan) | 40 | (0) |
| 2020–2023 | PT Prachuap | 90 | (0) |
| 2023–2025 | Uthai Thani | 4 | (0) |
| 2025– | Lamphun Warriors | 1 | (0) |

International career
| 2018 | Thailand U23 | 3 | (0) |
- * Club domestic league appearances and goals

Kwanchai Suklom (Thai: ขวัญชัย สุขล้อม born 12 January 1995), is a Thai professional footballer who plays as a goalkeeper for Thai League 1 club Lamphun Warriors.

== Honours ==
=== Club ===
Buriram United

- Thai League 1 (1): 2017

PT Prachuap

- Thai League Cup (1): 2019
