= Ratchapol Nawanno =

Thai footballer

Personal information
- Full name: Ratchapol Nawanno
- Date of birth: 28 April 1986 (age 40)
- Place of birth: Nakhon Pathom, Thailand
- Height: 1.71 m (5 ft 7 1/2 in)
- Position: Midfielder

Senior career*
Years	Team	Apps	(Gls)
2010	Nakhon Pathom United	17	(2)
2011–2016	Chainat Hornbill	88	(5)
2017–2018	Muangthong United	19	(2)
2018–2022	PT Prachuap	21	(0)
2022	Nongbua Pitchaya	8	(0)
2022–2023	Pattaya Dolphins United	11	(0)
2023–	Samut Sakhon City	16	(0)

International career
2013	Thailand	2	(0)
- * Club domestic league appearances and goals as of 20 May 2023

Ratchapol Nawanno (Thai: รัชพล นาวันโน; born April 28, 1986), simply known as Na (Thai: นะ) is a Thai professional footballer who plays as a midfielder.

== International career ==
In 2013 Ratchapol was called up to the national team by Surachai Jaturapattarapong to the 2015 AFC Asian Cup qualification. In October, 2013 he debuted for Thailand in a friendly match against Bahrain.

=== International ===
As of 12 November 2015

National team	Year	Apps	Goals
Thailand	2013	2	0
Thailand	Total	2	0

== Honours ==
=== Club ===
Muangthong United

- Thai League Cup (1): 2017
- Thailand Champions Cup (1): 2017
- Mekong Club Championship (1): 2017

PT Prachuap

- Thai League Cup (1): 2019

Pattaya Dolphins United

- Thai League 3 Eastern Region: 2022–23
