= Wanchalerm Yingyong =

Thai footballer (born 1993)

Personal information
- Full name: Wanchalerm Yingyong
- Date of birth: 12 August 1993 (age 33)
- Place of birth: Nakhon Si Thammarat, Thailand
- Height: 1.80 m (5 ft 11 in)
- Positions: Defensive midfielder; centre back

Team information
- Current team: Nara United

Youth career
- 2011: Police United

Senior career*
Years	Team	Apps	(Gls)
2011–2014	Police United	11	(1)
2012–2013	→ Look E-San (loan)	25	(6)
2015	Buriram United	2	(0)
2015	→ Chainat Hornbill (loan)	14	(1)
2016	Chainat Hornbill	3	(0)
2016–2018	Chiangrai United	8	(0)
2017	→ Port (loan)	1	(0)
2017–2018	→ PT Prachuap (loan)	28	(0)
2019–2022	PT Prachuap	18	(0)
2022–2023	Nongbua Pitchaya	17	(1)
2023–2024	Nakhon Si United	25	(2)
2024	Police Tero	12	(0)
2025	Mahasarakham SBT	10	(0)
2025	Nakhon Si United	23	(1)
2026–	Nara United	0	(0)

International career^{‡}
2011	Thailand U19	6	(2)
- * Club domestic league appearances and goals as of 1 June 2026 ‡ National team caps and goals as of 28 December 2014

Wanchalerm Yingyong (Thai: วันเฉลิม ยิ่งยง, born August 12, 1993) is a Thai professional footballer who plays as a defensive midfielder or centre back for Thai League 2 club Nara United.

== Honours ==
=== Club ===
PT Prachuap FC

- Thai League Cup (1) : 2019
