= Seeket Madputeh =

Thai footballer

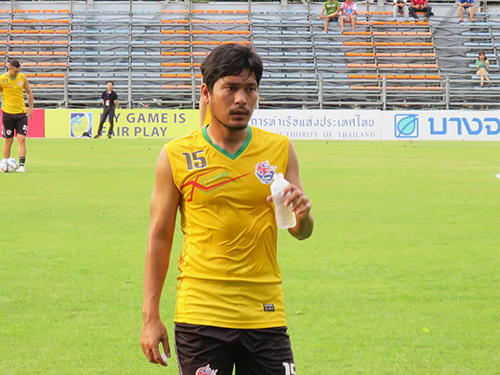

Personal information
- Full name: Seeket Madputeh
- Date of birth: 9 March 1990 (age 36)
- Place of birth: Satun, Thailand
- Height: 1.71 m (5 ft 7 1/2 in)
- Position: Right-back

Team information
- Current team: Chumphon United
- Number: 4

Youth career
- 2007–2008: Chonburi

Senior career*
Years	Team	Apps	(Gls)
2009–2012	Pattaya United	18	(1)
2013–2014	Army United	26	(0)
2013	→ Singhtarua (loan)	19	(4)
2015–2016	PTT Rayong	39	(2)
2017–2022	PT Prachuap	59	(2)
2022–2023	Nongbua Pitchaya	22	(1)
2023–2024	Lampang	32	(1)
2024–2025	Udon United	18	(0)
2025–	Chumphon United	9	(1)

International career^{‡}
2008–2009	Thailand U19	6	(0)
2011	Thailand U23	5	(0)
- * Club domestic league appearances and goals as of 17 March 2024 (UTC) ‡ National team caps and goals as of 17 September 2017 (UTC)

Seeket Madputeh (Thai: ซีเกต หมาดปูเต๊ะ; born 9 March 1989), simply known as Ket (Thai: เกต) is a Thai professional footballer who currently plays for Chumphon United in Thai League 3.

== Honours ==
=== Club ===
PT Prachuap FC

- Thai League Cup (1) : 2019
