= PT Prachuap F.C. =

Thai football club

PT Prachuap พีที ประจวบ
- Full name: PT Prachuap Football Club สโมสรฟุตบอลพีทีประจวบ
- Nicknames: The Killer Wasps (ต่อพิฆาต)
- Short name: PRC
- Founded: 2009; 17 years ago
- Stadium: Sam Ao Stadium; Prachuap Khiri Khan, Thailand
- Capacity: 5,000
- Coordinates: 11°49′03″N 99°47′17″E
- Chairman: Songkiet Limarunrak
- Head coach: Sasom Pobprasert
- League: Thai League 1
- 2025–26: Thai League 1, 6th of 16
- Website: pt-prachuap-fc.com
Home colours	Away colours	Third colours

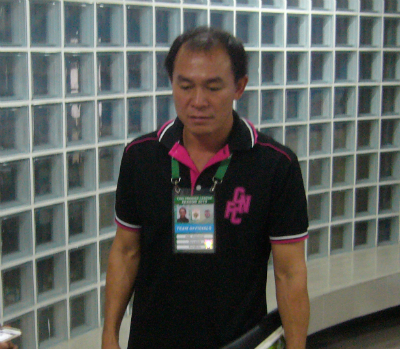
Thawatchai Damrong-Ongtrakul guided the team to their first major honours in 2019

Prachuap Football Club (Thai: สโมสรฟุตบอลประจวบ; currently known as PT Prachuap due to sponsorship reasons) is a Thai professional football club based in Prachuap Khiri Khan province, Thailand which currently play in the Thai League 1.

The club won their first and only major honour in the top flight where they went on to upset Thai giants Buriram United to win the 2019 Thai League Cup.

== History ==
The club was founded as Prachuap Football Club back in 2009 where they entered and played in Regional League Division 2 Central & Eastern region. With a limitation of budget and environment, they finished in tenth position out of 12 teams.

In 2010, Prachuap moved to the Southern division. When asked about the reason for the move, they cited insufficient budget and concerns about safety. In the 2011 season, Prachuap targeted a return to join the league again after pulling out in the 2010 season. The new chairman, Songkiat Lim-aroonrak, was appointed and aimed to change the club philosophy for the next generation of success. He considered re-designing the club with a new logo with resemblance of a Wasp. The club also cited with the colour orange and black which than they occupied the Sam Ao Stadium as their permanent home ground.

In 2014, Prachuap won the AIS League Division 2 – Southern Region and advanced through Champions League Round. Prachuap then defeated Thai Honda in the final match and were crowned the title thus earning promotion to the second tier.

In 2015, Prachuap began to play in Thai Division 1 League since the founding of the club in 2009. They finished mid-table, with good performance for their first season.

=== Rise to the top flight (2017–present) ===
In 2017, the club changed the team name to "PT Prachuap" to reciprocate for the main sponsor, PTG Energy, which sponsored the club by strengthening the squad with 20 new players and a more experienced coaching staff where Thawatchai Damrong-Ongtrakul was hired as the club head coach. PT Prachuap then finished third in the 2017 Thai League 2 where they earned a promotion to the top flight league.

PT Prachuap then played in the 2018 Thai League where they finished in sixth place in their first season in the top flight league whereby Jonatan Reis became the club highest goalscorer in a season with 26 goals.

In 2019, head coach Thawatchai Damrong-Ongtrakul helms the team all the way to the 2019 Thai League Cup final after beating Chiangrai United 4–3 on penalties shootout in the semi-finals. PT Prachuap came out victorious after defeating Thai giants Buriram United 8–7 on penalties shootout to win their first ever major title in the club history. The club goalkeeper, Nattapong Khajohnmalee also won the 'Best Player' award in the league cup.

== Team image ==
=== Crest history ===
- In 2007, the first official logo was designed under the concept of "Club home province famous". Prachuap Khiri Khan is famous in various aspects. They considered interpreting the Kui Buri elephant and Kuha Karuhas pavilion in their logo. Kui Buri is famous for rich forest with wild elephant habitat. "Kuha Karuhas pavilion", One of Khao Sam Roi Yot National Park most visit point, located inside Phraya Nakhon Cave, it is a historic site built during King Rama V's (King Chulalongkorn) reign. The throne has since become the symbol of Prachuap Khiri Khan Province.
- In the 2011 season, the club targeted to re-design a new logo. "Wasps" was chosen as club characters and mascot. It was derived from the nickname of the Minister Chalermchai Sri-on, former MPs of Prachuap Khiri Khan Province, whom the president of the club respects very much.
- In the 2018 season, the club changed its logo by using an orange-black color and add text PT into their logo.

== Kit suppliers and shirt sponsors ==
Period	Kit manufacturer	Main sponsor
2014–2015	(Thailand) Tamudo	(Thailand) Sahaviriya
2016	(Thailand) Sakka Sport	(Thailand) PTG Energy
2017	(Thailand) Gear Athletics	(Thailand) PTG Energy
2018–2021	(Thailand) Warrix	(Thailand) PTG Energy
2021–2023	(Thailand) Grand Sport	(Thailand) PTG Energy
2023–2025	(Thailand) Volt	(Thailand) PTG Energy
2025–present	(Thailand) Ari	(Thailand) PTG Energy

== Stadium ==
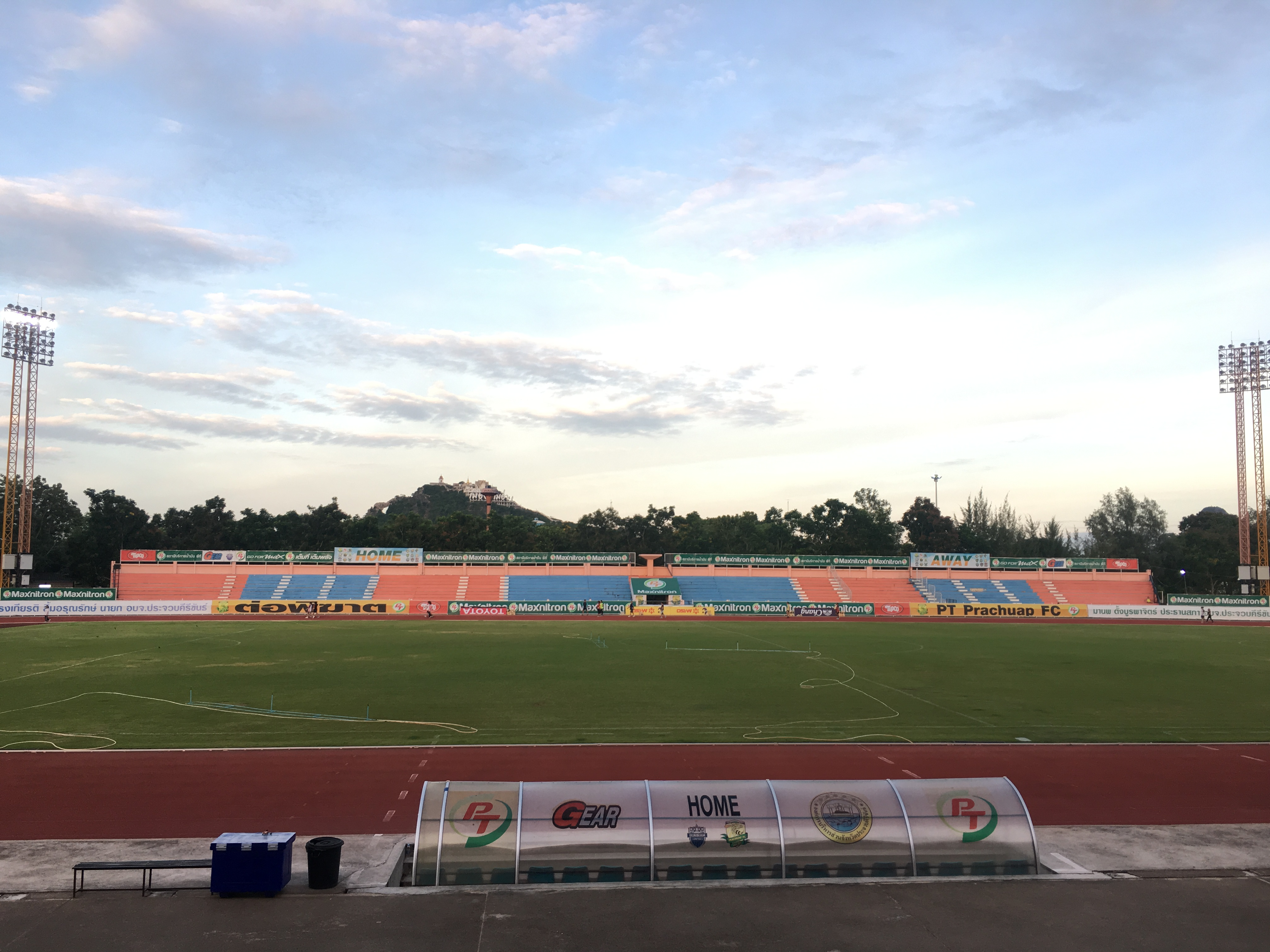
Sam Ao Stadium

Sam Ao Stadium (Thai: สนามกีฬากลางจังหวัดประจวบคีรีขันธ์ หรือ สนามกีฬาสามอ่าว), formerly known as Prachuap Khiri Khan Province Stadium, is a multi-purpose stadium in Prachuap Khiri Khan Province, Thailand. It is currently used mostly for football matches and is the home stadium of PT Prachuap. The stadium can hold up to 5,000 capacity.

Coordinates	Google Maps	Location	Stadium	Capacity	Year
11°49′03″N 99°47′17″E	Google Maps Location	Prachuap Khiri Khan, Thailand	Sam Ao Stadium	5,000	2009–present

== Players ==
=== Current squad ===
Note: Flags indicate national team as defined under FIFA eligibility rules; some limited exceptions apply. Players may hold more than one non-FIFA nationality.

No.	Pos.	Nation	Player
1	GK	THA	Soponwit Rakyart
2	DF	THA	Oussama Thiangkham
3	DF	BRA	Bernardo Vilar
5	DF	BRA	Airton
6	DF	THA	Siravich Chaivoramukkul
8	MF	THA	Saharat Kanyaroj
9	FW	KOR	Lee Jeong-hyeop
10	FW	BRA	Tauã
11	MF	JPN	Rei Tachikawa
14	MF	ENG	Andros Townsend
15	DF	PHI	Jesper Nyholm
17	FW	ESP	Édgar Méndez
19	MF	THA	Prommin Pinkeaw
21	MF	BRA	Tailson
23	MF	THA	Kannarin Thawornsak

No.	Pos.	Nation	Player
24	DF	THA	Wanchat Choosong
28	MF	THA	Zopfan Sanron
30	MF	THA	Jittiphat Wasungnoen
39	GK	THA	Wattanachai Srathongjan
41	FW	THA	Phanthamit Praphanth
44	MF	THA	Wuttikai Sritong
47	MF	THA	Chitsanuphong Phimpsang
48	FW	THA	Jehhanafee Mamah
62	MF	BRA	Lucas Grossi
70	MF	THA	Prasit Jantum
74	DF	THA	Phon-Ek Jensen
88	FW	THA	Jiraphan Phasukhan (Captain)
98	GK	THA	Hatsachai Sankla
99	GK	THA	Abdulfarus Sama-aeh

=== Out on loan ===
Note: Flags indicate national team as defined under FIFA eligibility rules; some limited exceptions apply. Players may hold more than one non-FIFA nationality.

No. / Pos. / Nation / Player	No. / Pos. / Nation / Player

== Management and staff ==
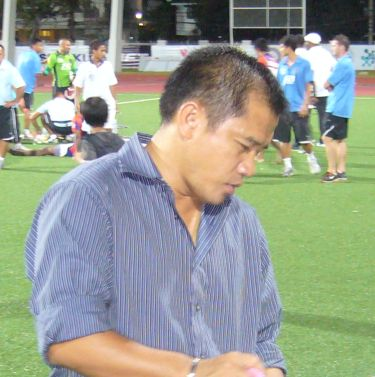
Sasom Pobprasert was appointed head coach in 2024

Position	Name
Head coach	(Thailand) Sasom Pobprasert
Assistant coach	(Thailand) Weerayut Bin Abdullohman (Thailand) Sorrachat Pobprasert
Goalkeeper coach	(Thailand) Naratip Phanprom
Fitness coach	(Thailand) Trinet Jankrab
Masseur	(Thailand) Suhaiman Hama (Thailand) Thetsak Phumma
Interpreter	(Brazil) Diogo Figueira (Thailand) Jakkapan Kaewsangthong

== Honours ==
=== Leagues ===
- Regional League Division 2
  - Winners: 2014
- Regional League Southern Division
  - Winners: 2014
- Regional League Central-West Division
  - Runners-up: 2013

=== Cups ===
- FA Cup
  - Runners-up: 2025–26
- League Cup
  - Winners: 2019

== Records and statistics ==
As of 26 January 2026.

Top 10 all-time appearances
Rank	Player	Years	Club appearances
1	(Thailand) Kwanchai Suklom	2017–2023	157
3	(Thailand) Apichart Denman	2018–2024	141
2	(Thailand) Peerawat Akkratum	2020–2025	153
4	(Thailand) Prasid Jantum	2021–present	115
5	(Montenegro) Adnan Orahovac	2018–2022	114
6	(Thailand) Seeket Madputeh	2017–2022	96
7	(Thailand) Ratchapol Nawanno	2018–2022	94
8	(Thailand) Wanchalerm Yingyong	2017–2022	89
9	(Thailand) Amorn Thammanarm	2017–2021	83
10	(Thailand) Jirapan Phasukihan	2023–present	82

Top 10 all-time scorers
Rank	Player	Club appearances	Total goals
1	(Brazil) Willen Mota	58	34
2	(Brazil) Samuel Rosa	69	33
3	(Brazil) Jonatan Reis	34	26
4	(Guinea) Lonsana Doumbouya	27	17
5	(Brazil) Tauã	60	14
6	(Thailand) Amorn Thammanarm	83	12
7	(Thailand) Apichart Denman	141	11
8	(Thailand) Chutipol Thongthae	79	10
8	(Thailand) Saharat Kanyaroj	67	10
8	(Brazil) Chrigor Moraes	14	10

- Biggest wins:
  - 7–0 vs Kasetsart (21 June 2017)
  - 7–0 vs Khon Kaen Mordindang (7 November 2020)
- Heaviest defeats: 7–2 vs BG Pathum United (6 April 2022)
- Youngest goal scorers: Yotsakorn Burapha ~ 19 years 10 months 12 days old (On 20 April 2025 vs Nakhon Ratchasima)
- Oldest goal scorers: Adul Muensamaan ~ 37 years 10 months 14 days old (On 31 March 2019 vs Chonburi)
- Youngest ever debutant: Soffan Sanron ~ 18 years 5 months 3 days old (On 20 April 2025 vs Nakhon Ratchasima)
- Oldest ever player: Adul Muensamaan ~ 40 years 8 months 23 days old (On 9 February 2022 vs Chainat Hornbill)

== Former players ==
=== International capped players ===
AFC/OFC.: (Cambodia) Nick Taylor; (Indonesia) Yanto Basna; (Kyrgyzstan) Edgar Bernhardt; (Laos) Soukaphone Vongchiengkham; (Lebanon) Soony Saad; (Malaysia) Junior Eldstål; (Myanmar) Nanda Lin Kyaw Chit; (Palestine) Tamer Seyam; (Philippines) Adrian Ugelvik; (Philippines) Amin Nazari; (Philippines) Dennis Villanueva; (Philippines) Jesper Nyholm; (Philippines) Iain Ramsay; (Philippines) Patrick Reichelt; (Singapore) Baihakki Khaizan; (South Korea) Kim Geun-chol; (South Korea) Lee Jeong-hyeop; (Uzbekistan) Artyom Filiposyan	CAF.: (Guinea) Lonsana Doumbouya; (Nigeria) Aaron Samuel Olanare	UEFA.: (Croatia) Andrija Filipović; (France) Romain Habran; (North Macedonia) Hristijan Kirovski	CONMEBOL/ CONCACAF.: (Brazil) Bruno Mezenga; (Brazil) Willen Mota; (Curaçao) Sendley Bito

== Managerial history ==
As from the 2013 season onwards

Name	Period	Honours
(Thailand) Thongchai Sukkoki	July 2013–December 2014	2014 Regional League Division 2
(Thailand) Dusit Chalermsan	January 2015–November 2016	
(Thailand) Thawatchai Damrong-ongtrakul	January 2017–30 March 2021	2019 Thai League Cup
(Japan) Masami Taki	30 March 2021 – 15 November 2021	
(Thailand) Issara Sritaro	15 November 2021 – 15 June 2022	
(Thailand) Teerasak Po-on	15 June 2022 – 11 November 2022	
(Thailand) Dusit Chalermsan (2)	14 November 2022 – 12 May 2023	
(Thailand) Thawatchai Damrong-ongtrakul (2)	20 May 2023 – 1 October 2023	
(Thailand) Weerayut Binabdullahman (caretaker)	1 October 2023 – 11 October 2023	
(Montenegro) Božidar Bandović	11 October 2023 – 12 December 2023	
(Thailand) Dusit Chalermsan (interim) (3)	12 December 2023 – 31 January 2024	
(Thailand) Sasom Pobprasert	31 January 2024–present	

== Season by season record ==
Season	League									FA Cup	League Cup	Top scorer	
Season	Division	P	W	D	L	F	A	Pts	Pos	FA Cup	League Cup	Name	Goals
2009	DIV 2 Central & East	22	2	14	6	23	32	20	10th				
2010	DIV 2 South ^{[A]}												
2011	DIV 2 Central & East	30	7	3	20	25	48	24	13th				
2012	DIV 2 Central & East	34	13	12	9	45	33	51	7th				
2013	DIV 2 Central & West	24	13	7	4	34	19	46	2nd				
2014	DIV 2 South	24	15	6	3	46	19	51	1st	R2			
2015	DIV 1	38	15	9	14	56	54	54	8th	R1	R2	(Brazil) Nascimento Dos Santos Neto	12
2016	DIV 1	26	9	8	9	36	36	35	7th	R3	R1	(North Macedonia) Hristijan Kirovski	17
2017	T2	32	18	5	9	58	40	59	3rd	R3	R2	(Brazil) Willen Mota	17
2018	T1	34	15	8	11	56	46	53	6th	R1	R1	(Brazil) Jonatan Ferreira Reis	26
2019	T1	30	9	10	11	32	44	37	9th	R1	W	(Brazil) Caion	6
2020–21	T1	30	10	7	13	35	47	37	10th	R2	N/A ^{[B]}	(Brazil) Willen Mota	16
2021–22	T1	30	8	7	15	30	45	31	13th	R1	SF	(Brazil) Willen Mota	13
2022–23	T1	30	9	8	13	44	51	35	11th	R3	SF	(Brazil) Samuel Rosa	18
2023–24	T1	30	8	10	12	33	39	34	10th	R3	R2	(Brazil) Samuel Rosa	7
2024–25	T1	30	12	8	10	49	39	44	7th	R1	R2	(Brazil) Chrigor	10
2025–26	T1	30	11	12	7	39	37	45	6th	RU	R2	(Spain) Édgar Méndez	11

^{[B]} On 5 August 2020, Football Association of Thailand decided to cancel the 2020 League Cup due to COVID-19 pandemic and main sponsor Toyota cancellation of support for the League Cup tournament with the reason of economic impact.

Champions	Runners-up	Third place	Promoted	Relegated

- P = Played
- W = Games won
- D = Games drawn
- L = Games lost
- F = Goals for
- A = Goals against
- Pts = Points
- Pos = Final position
- N/A = No answer
- DIV 1 = Yamaha League 1
- TPL = Thai Premier League
- T1 = Thai League 1
- T2 = Thai League 2
- QR1 = First Qualifying Round
- QR2 = Second Qualifying Round
- QR3 = Third Qualifying Round
- QR4 = Fourth Qualifying Round
- RInt = Intermediate Round
- R1 = Round 1
- R2 = Round 2
- R3 = Round 3
- R4 = Round 4
- R5 = Round 5
- R6 = Round 6
- GR = Group stage
- QF = Quarter-finals
- SF = Semi-finals
- RU = Runners-up
- S = Shared
- W = Winners
