= 2023–24 Thai FA Cup =

Chang FA Cup

Tournament details
- Country: Thailand
- Dates: 4 October 2023 – 15 June 2024
- Teams: 95

Final positions
- Champions: Bangkok United (1st title)
- Runners-up: Dragon Pathumwan Kanchanaburi

Tournament statistics
- Matches played: 94
- Goals scored: 354 (3.77 per match)
- Top goal scorer(s): Samuel Nnamani (5 goals)

Awards
- Best player: Weerathep Pomphan

The 2023–24 Thai FA Cup is the 30th season of a Thailand's knockout football competition. The tournament was sponsored by Chang, and known as the Chang FA Cup (Thai: ช้าง เอฟเอคัพ) for sponsorship purposes. The tournament is organized by the Football Association of Thailand. 95 clubs were accepted into the tournament, and it began with the qualification round on 4 October 2023 and concluded with the final on 15 June 2024. The winner would have qualified for the 2024–25 AFC Champions League Elite qualifying play-off and the 2024 Thailand Champions Cup.

== Calendar ==
Round	Date	Matches	Clubs	New entries this round
Qualification round	4 October 2023	31	11 + 24 + 5 + 22 → 31	11 2023–24 Thai League 2; 24 2023–24 Thai League 3; 5 Thailand Semi-pro League; 22 Thailand Amateur League
First round	1 November 2023	32	31 + 16 + 2 + 7 + 2 + 6 → 32	16 2023–24 Thai League 1; 2 2023–24 Thai League 2; 7 2023–24 Thai League 3; 2 Thailand Semi-pro League; 6 Thailand Amateur League
Second round	20 December 2023	16	32 → 16	
Third round	28 February 2024	8	16 → 8	
Quarter-finals	10 April 2024	4	8 → 4	
Semi-finals	8 May 2024	2	4 → 2	
Final	15 June 2024	1	2 → Champions	
Total				95 clubs

== Results ==
Note: T1: Clubs from Thai League 1; T2: Clubs from Thai League 2; T3: Clubs from Thai League 3; TS: Clubs from Thailand Semi-pro League; TA: Clubs from Thailand Amateur League.

=== Qualification round ===
There were 11 clubs from 2023–24 Thai League 2, 24 clubs from 2023–24 Thai League 3, 5 clubs from Thailand Semi-pro League, and 22 clubs from Thailand Amateur League that have signed to qualify for 2023–24 Thai FA cup. This round was drawn on 1 September 2023. 123 goals occurred in this round.

4 October 2023	Nakhon Si City (TA)	0–0 (4–1 p)	Muang Loei United (T3)	Tha Sala, Nakhon Si Thammarat
15:30 (UTC+7)		Report		Stadium: Stadium of Walailak University; Attendance: 220; Referee: Pornsak Paksan; Assistant referees: Suwit Kaewrod, Charin Kalamad; Fourth official: Nattapon Ninlawan
	Penalties
	Chalit Imchom (penalty scored); Kaemmasak Sangthong (penalty scored); Ponlakit Plodsakul (penalty scored); Thanakrit Phongpaew (penalty scored)		(penalty missed) Rapeephat Butrach; (penalty scored) Peerapat Kantha; (penalty missed) Wachiranon Ruangdech

4 October 2023	FC Mahasarakham (TA)	0–1	Phatthalung (T3)	Mueang, Mahasarakham
15:30 (UTC+7)		Report	Teerawat Durnee 62'	Stadium: Mahasarakham Provincial Stadium; Attendance: 225; Referee: Jakkrit Pratum; Assistant referees: Wasan Promyaca, Natthakan Thongchok; Fourth official: Sarawut Dassada

4 October 2023	The iCON RSU (T3)	0–3	Marines (T3)	Khlong Luang, Pathum Thani
15:30 (UTC+7)		Report	Nuttawut Onin 26' (pen.); Natthawat Chansrinual 45+1'; Nattakarn Kaewkong 75'	Stadium: Stadium of Bangkok University; Attendance: 50; Referee: Pichit Thongjanmoon; Assistant referees: Natthakit Konfu, Nattaphak Sawasdee; Fourth official: Supiree Testhomya

4 October 2023	Udon Thani City (TA)	4–1	Chiangmai Country (TA)	Mueang, Udon Thani
15:30 (UTC+7)	Watcharapong Pakpiphruk 13'; Puttipat Kongkietkarn 21'; Thawisak Kidraksa 25', 28'	Report	Jhakkri Panthong 48'	Stadium: SAT Udon Thani Stadium; Attendance: 73; Referee: Pisal Motongsri; Assistant referees: Jakkrit Nahuanin, Kornthip Riyaboot; Fourth official: Nutthawat Kongsuwan

4 October 2023	AUU Inter Bangkok (T3)	1–1 (5–4 p)	Mahasarakham SBT (T3)	Min Buri, Bangkok
15:30 (UTC+7)	Chayaphon Phanwiset 45+1'	Report	Wanit Chaisan 8'	Stadium: 72nd Anniversary Stadium, Min Buri; Attendance: 80; Referee: Theerapon Nakthong; Assistant referees: Chaiwat Rupsa-at, Ekkalak Muangkhotr; Fourth official: Peerapol Panyatong
	Penalties
	Sarfo Otis Adjei (penalty scored); Arthit Huailuek (penalty scored); Tanasorn Janthrakhot (penalty scored); Porawat Siriwattanakorn (penalty scored); Thatchaphon Khonman (penalty scored)		(penalty scored) Wanit Chaisan; (penalty missed) Phurewat Aunthong; (penalty scored) Nattapong Chaidee; (penalty scored) Nattapon Thaptanon; (penalty scored) Erivelto

4 October 2023	Prime Bangkok (T3)	4–0	Chachoengsao Hi-Tek (T3)	Bang Kapi, Bangkok
15:30 (UTC+7)	Kitichai Tunnoofaeb 50', 84', 90+2'; Chawanwit Saelao 62'	Report		Stadium: Stadium of Ramkhamhaeng University; Attendance: 150; Referee: Booncharoen Phochai; Assistant referees: Theerapon Nonthakhamjan, Niracha Sangprasit; Fourth official: Tanakorn Leechaisathaporn

4 October 2023	Kamphaengphet (T3)	4–1	Fleet (T3)	Mueang, Kamphaengphet
15:30 (UTC+7)	Sakonwat Srithapak 6'; Anek Sonsudjai 9'; Natthaphon Yueayai 38'; Abbo Bouba 78'	Report	Nawaphon Sonkham 83'	Stadium: Cha Kung Rao Stadium; Referee: Suchart Kuisue; Assistant referees: Jarin Champakpriew, Phichayut Noitathong; Fourth official: Ekkachai Juywong

4 October 2023	Udon United (T3)	6–0	Samut Prakan Junior United (TA)	Mueang, Udon Thani
15:30 (UTC+7)	Sudthirak Chuisiri 34'; Sorathorn Chainamuang 56'; Tanawit Tanaroek 63' (o.g.); Pitipong Wongbut 73', 78'; Abner Gomes Faria 90'	Report		Stadium: Stadium of Thailand National Sports University, Udon Thani Campus; Attendance: 169; Referee: Chaisiri Sonnam; Assistant referees: Chanatip Meechai, Jirat Srilapho; Fourth official: Komkrit Sawong

4 October 2023	TOA Dovechem (TA)	1–2	Maraleina (T3)	Mueang, Chonburi
15:30 (UTC+7)	Jiraruwat Saenrupha 18' (pen.)	Report	Chitsanuphong Phimpsang 39', 66'	Stadium: Saen Suk Town Municipality Stadium; Attendance: 200; Referee: Chayapol Laosuphan; Assistant referees: Kodcharat Rattanachot, Chinnaphat Lablae; Fourth official: Monruedee Junmai

4 October 2023	Thap Luang United (T3)	1–1 (4–5 p)	Chiangmai United (T2)	Pak Tho, Ratchaburi
15:30 (UTC+7)	Suraphod Pankhruea 73'	Report	Thana Isor 36'	Stadium: Pak Tho Subdistrict Municipality Stadium; Attendance: 160; Referee: Pawara Seejen; Assistant referees: Khomchalach Lekhawijit, Kiadtisak Janmol; Fourth official: Kriangkrai Thiphanunjarukorn
	Penalties
	Phoutthasay Khochalern (penalty scored); Siwa Pikulhom (penalty missed); Narongrit Kaeomani (penalty scored); Teerayut Ngamlamai (penalty scored); Chokchai Aeammongkhol (penalty scored)		(penalty scored) Than Paing; (penalty scored) Kantapong Bandasak; (penalty scored) Sarawut Sintupun; (penalty scored) Pansiri Sukunee; (penalty scored) Nattawut Sanguthai

4 October 2023	Ayothaya Warrior (TS)	1–0	Futera United (TS)	Phra Nakhon Si Ayutthaya, Ayutthaya
15:30 (UTC+7)	Tanet Saengthong 19'	Report		Stadium: Ayutthaya Provincial Stadium; Referee: Yuttana Sadkrathok; Assistant referees: Patcharapon Losomsup, Kittichok Huthip; Fourth official: Natipong Aiemso

4 October 2023	Roi Et PB United (TS)	4–0	Chumphon United (TA)	Mueang, Roi Et
15:30 (UTC+7)	Saichon Magmesoog 39'; Thongchai Ratchai 70'; Pongsathon Jitpim 90+1'; Sarawut Masuk 90+4'	Report		Stadium: Roi Et Provincial Stadium; Referee: Teerapak Saibun; Assistant referees: Pongsatorn Thongmo, Titima Wongkhan; Fourth official: Thanapon Suwannaket

4 October 2023	Kalasin United (TA)	2–0	Phachi City (TS)	Mueang, Kalasin
15:30 (UTC+7)	Pisit Nasathit 12'; Detmongkhon Saiyaporn 44'	Report		Stadium: Kalasin Town Municipality Stadium; Attendance: 500; Referee: Warakorn Suraporn; Assistant referees: Nattapol Sararat, Thammanoon Sasen; Fourth official: Kittiwat Kittpaksakun

4 October 2023	Mahanakon Khon Kaen (TA)	3–1	Kanthararom United (TA)	Mueang, Khon Kaen
15:30 (UTC+7)	Somprasong Promsorn 15', 70'; Peerawis Ritsriboon 51'	Report	Jeerawat Thonglue 73'	Stadium: Khon Kaen PAO. Stadium; Referee: Manuschai Chawong; Assistant referees: Nopphadet Rangkrathok, Teerawat Khangkratoke; Fourth official: Preecha Chuchartchuart

4 October 2023	Uthumphon Chullamanee (TA)	1–9	Rayong (T2)	Mueang, Sisaket
15:30 (UTC+7)	Lertpisit Thothong 8'	Report	Jetsada Batchari 13' (pen.), 24'; Jonah Natan Duchowny 40', 50', 72', 81'; Pongsakorn Takum 42'; Saharat Rattanawijit 45+1'; Tanawat Mitatha 90+4' (o.g.)	Stadium: Sisaket Provincial Stadium; Referee: Amnat Makklang; Assistant referees: Nattapong Wadweangcom, Supachai Sanoi; Fourth official: Ruttapol Kongboonwas

4 October 2023	ST Youth (TA)	2–1	Chiangmai (T2)	Mueang, Chumphon
15:30 (UTC+7)	Pattarachanon Sayomphak 15'; Natiphong Manohan 63'	Report	Amornthep Maundee 57'	Stadium: Stadium of Thailand National Sports University, Chumphon Campus; Attendance: 1,500; Referee: Nattawut Sangpan; Assistant referees: Hanyot Buangrab, Phitsanu Chusi; Fourth official: Pornchai Anupan

4 October 2023	APD United (TA)	1–1 (4–5 p)	Romklao United (TA)	Lam Luk Ka, Pathum Thani
15:30 (UTC+7)	Kittisak Promyat 17'	Report	Suphawit Junngam 8'	Stadium: Dhupatemiya Stadium; Attendance: 62; Referee: Song Montha; Assistant referees: Apiwich Mukdahan, Weerawat Chantawad; Fourth official: Thapana Thaworn
	Penalties
	Farid Madsoh (penalty scored); Chatrchai Dechaiyaphum (penalty missed); Kittisak Promyat (penalty scored); Supat Phaensombun (penalty scored); Nopparat Sakun-ood (penalty scored)		(penalty scored) Thirachot Saensuk; (penalty scored) Nifadin Hayi-arsan; (penalty scored) Korakit Kaphisom; (penalty scored) Teerasak Khatchakon; (penalty scored) Nattawut Khunthee

4 October 2023	Kasem Bundit University (T3)	2–3	Saimit Kabin United (T3)	Min Buri, Bangkok
15:30 (UTC+7)	Raoul Uche Nduka 7'; Prasert Pattawin 9'	Report	Theerakorn Sunthonwat 28'; Panutach Rungjang 40', 76'	Stadium: Stadium of Kasem Bundit University; Attendance: 107; Referee: Niruch Panjontuk; Assistant referees: Sujin Rodart, Tibeth Longtree; Fourth official: Aidsara Gaedthai

4 October 2023	Rajpracha (T3)	7–0	K.5 Viwat Group (TA)	Bang Yai, Nonthaburi
16:00 (UTC+7)	Thapoppon Butkaew 11', 37', 80'; Sosuke Kimura 41', 45', 74'; Samuel Erik Strong 55'	Report		Stadium: Nonthaburi Stadium; Attendance: 115; Referee: Worapon Sanjan; Assistant referees: Pichaya Kasem, Rangsan Kangchainguan; Fourth official: Arnon Chaphondon

4 October 2023	Lopburi City (T3)	0–0 (3–4 p)	Songkhla (T3)	Mueang, Lopburi
16:00 (UTC+7)		Report		Stadium: Phra Ramesuan Stadium; Attendance: 100; Referee: Saravut Suksalee; Assistant referees: Chanitpol Tarawan, Patcharapong Chiangta; Fourth official: Chayanan Tuto
	Penalties
	Lucas Gaudencio Moraes (penalty scored); Teerapat Sangwong (penalty scored); Hatthaphan Chiarwichai (penalty missed); Piravich Aroonrat (penalty scored); Thiraphong Yangdi (penalty missed)		(penalty scored) Pornthep Heemla; (penalty scored) Bisrun Semuso; (penalty scored) Adam Lassamano; (penalty missed) Krit Khongsan; (penalty scored) Thanphisit Hempandan

4 October 2023	Sisaket United (T3)	3–0	Siwilai (TS)	Mueang, Sisaket
17:00 (UTC+7)	Nitipat Kansorn 4'; Wongsakorn Saenruecha 56'; Panigazzi Matías Ignacio 72'	Report		Stadium: Sri Nakhon Lamduan Stadium; Attendance: 236; Referee: Damrong Wangraha; Assistant referees: Phanu Phalhaphon, Payao Khuankhanueng; Fourth official: Chadmongkol Natanreep

4 October 2023	Samut Sakhon City (T3)	7–2	AES Moonlight (TA)	Mueang, Samut Sakhon
17:00 (UTC+7)	Arthit Sunthornphit 30'; Phakhinai Nammeechai 41'; Slanyu Buanaem 45'; Pongsil Tana 68'; Chayaphat Srirat 82'; Somsak Musikaphan 85'; Yod Chanthawong 89'	Report	Teerawat Noulpak 53'; Damrong Aiemdang 87'	Stadium: Stadium of Thailand National Sports University, Samut Sakhon Campus; Attendance: 140; Referee: Dassakhon Hokla; Assistant referees: Nanthawat Chobsuan, Watchara Wongkhan; Fourth official: Pawarin Chukong

4 October 2023	Nakhon Si United (T2)	5–0	Khon Kaen (T3)	Mueang, Nakhon Si Thammarat
17:00 (UTC+7)	Pedro Paulo 2'; Niphitpon Hadchan 12', 32'; Poomphat Sarapisitphat 67'; Amorntep Nilnoy 84'	Report		Stadium: Nakhon Si Thammarat Provincial Stadium; Attendance: 500; Referee: Paisan Bendem-alee; Assistant referees: Jareon Nunboon, Abdulrohim Sitiloh; Fourth official: Artit Srinoy

4 October 2023	Phrae United (T2)	2–0	Muang Trang United (T3)	Mueang, Phrae
18:00 (UTC+7)	Patrick Cruz 52'; Sumeth Saenbut 76'	Report		Stadium: Huai Ma Stadium; Attendance: 389; Referee: Wirot Oupachit; Assistant referees: Nonthanan Khanthawong, Natthawut Tasmak; Fourth official: Samrit Ritkaew

4 October 2023	Lampang (T2)	6–0	Samut Prakan United (TA)	Mueang, Lampang
18:00 (UTC+7)	Jirayu Saenap 30', 45+3', 85'; Pornsawan Somsanit 34'; Suksan Saengkham 48'; Thitiwat Janda 61'	Report		Stadium: Lampang Provincial Stadium; Attendance: 370; Referee: Wathanyu Morin; Assistant referees: Songrit Trakulchai, Panuwat Khuanpet; Fourth official: Peerasan Krataithong

4 October 2023	Nongbua Pitchaya (T2)	4–1	Navy (T3)	Mueang, Nongbua Lamphu
18:00 (UTC+7)	Chawin Thirawatsri 60', 90+2'; Weerayut Sriwichai 69'; Jakkrawut Songma 88'	Report	Apisit Saenseekhammuan 51' (o.g.)	Stadium: Pitchaya Stadium; Attendance: 1,048; Referee: Anupong Duangsri; Assistant referees: Rachan Dawangpa, Suparak Nilkad; Fourth official: Vitsawa Nanchana

4 October 2023	Kasetsart (T2)	5–0	BP Friend United (TA)	Chatuchak, Bangkok
18:00 (UTC+7)	Apinan Jamratrueangrong 23'; Arnon Prasongporn 24'; Ritthidet Phensawat 40', 65'; Aee Soe 56' (pen.)	Report		Stadium: Insee Chantarasatit Stadium; Attendance: 100; Referee: Suriyo Kanhachalee; Assistant referees: Chaowalit Poonprasit, Nattphon Chuensamran; Fourth official: Atiwat Seelalo

4 October 2023	Nakhon Ratchasima Mazda (T2)	0–0 (4–3 p)	Phrae (TA)	Mueang, Nakhon Ratchasima
18:00 (UTC+7)		Report		Stadium: His Majesty the King's 80th Birthday Anniversary Stadium; Attendance: 2,200; Referee: Jarin Yawapee; Assistant referees: Samart Kaikaew, Nuttapong Khunlert; Fourth official: Natthwut Nammuang
	Penalties
	Ekkasit Chaobut (penalty scored); Somkaet Kunmee (penalty scored); Watcharin Nuengprakaew (penalty scored); Apisit Khuankwai (penalty scored)		(penalty scored) Nathakon Phakdi; (penalty scored) Khunanon Chornpradit; (penalty scored) Thanathorn Komaram; (penalty missed) Kroekkiat Kongkramut; (penalty missed) Atikan Saenram

4 October 2023	Suphanburi (T2)	4–0	Jungle Cat (TA)	Mueang, Suphanburi
18:00 (UTC+7)	Rachanon Kanyathong 17', 34'; Sitthinan Rungrueang 25' (pen.); Danuson Wijitpunya 37'	Report		Stadium: Suphanburi Provincial Stadium; Attendance: 617; Referee: Veeraporn Maophaeo; Assistant referees: Siwat Chaithong, Anucha Pinamon; Fourth official: Putthipong Issising

4 October 2023	Bangkok (T3)	2–0	Pratunam BSB (TA)	Thung Khru, Bangkok
18:00 (UTC+7)	Sirodom Konsungnoen 44'; Carlos Eduardo dos Santos Lima 48'	Report		Stadium: 72nd Anniversary Stadium, Bang Mot; Attendance: 300; Referee: Suthipong Teekhasuk; Assistant referees: Opas Intaviset, Palakorn Parasatit; Fourth official: Jasada Tongkam

4 October 2023	Dragon Pathumwan Kanchanaburi (T2)	13–0	Namphong United (TA)	Mueang, Kanchanaburi
18:30 (UTC+7)	Thitiwat Phranmaen 2', 32'; Anusorn Phrmprasit 9'; Teerapat Chadphuk 13'; Anawat Koedsombat 16', 71'; Sengtong Rattanavilay 24'; Misut Wisu Milan 43'; Pacharakorn Nilploypetch 58'; Júnior Batista 63', 68', 85', 90+2'	Report		Stadium: Kanchanaburi Provincial Stadium; Attendance: 600; Referee: Wicharn Klinthaworn; Assistant referees: Sahatnet Deemongkol, Pathompong Anunluksanakul; Fourth official: Alongkorn Khonwai

=== First round ===
The first round would feature 31 clubs that were the winners of the qualification round including 10 clubs from T2, 13 clubs from T3, 2 clubs from TS, and 6 clubs from TA and the new entries that were 16 clubs from 2023–24 Thai League 1, 2 clubs from 2023–24 Thai League 2, 7 clubs from 2023–24 Thai League 3, 2 clubs from Thailand Semi-pro League, and 6 clubs from Thailand Amateur League. This round was drawn on 12 October 2023. 128 goals occurred in this round.

1 November 2023	Udon United (T3)	5–0	Pakkran United (TA)	Mueang, Udon Thani
15:00 (UTC+7)	Niwat Nonkao 11'; Phongphat Pholphut 42'; Sudthirak Chuisiri 49'; Sorathorn Chainamuang 68'; Pitipong Wongbut 87' (pen.)	Report		Stadium: Stadium of Thailand National Sports University, Udon Thani Campus; Attendance: 70; Referee: Anan Keawmuangkhun; Assistant referees: Kitsada Fromthaisong, Jakkrit Pratum; Fourth official: Saengsuree Pochana

1 November 2023	Prime Bangkok (T3)	5–0	Thonburi Forest (TA)	Bang Kapi, Bangkok
15:00 (UTC+7)	Chawanwit Saelao 40', 86'; Abdulrahman Kelani A.K. Essadi 42', 72'; Kamin Kurakanok 90+4'	Report		Stadium: Stadium of Ramkhamhaeng University; Attendance: 250; Referee: Aidsara Gaedthai; Assistant referees: Sujin Rodart, Sopon Boonlest; Fourth official: Supiree Testhomya

1 November 2023	Saimit Kabin United (T3)	1–0	Phrae United (T2)	Kabin Buri, Prachinburi
15:00 (UTC+7)	Thitiphong Yakhampin 9'	Report		Stadium: Nomklao Maharat Stadium; Attendance: 200; Referee: Atiwat Seelalo; Assistant referees: Anucha Pinamon, Sarayut Sriampri; Fourth official: Suriyo Kanhachalee

1 November 2023	Chattrakan City (TS)	2–3 (a.e.t.)	Dragon Pathumwan Kanchanaburi (T2)	Mueang, Phitsanulok
15:00 (UTC+7)	Weerawat Konsombut 42'; Jirasak Kumthaisong 73' (o.g.)	Report	Teerapat Chadphuk 13'; Chaiwat Plinklong 85' (o.g.); Elisio Batista da Conceição Júnior 105'	Stadium: Stadium of Pibulsongkram Rajabhat University; Attendance: 37; Referee: Direk Kaort; Assistant referees: Apichat Prasasak, Natthawut Tasmak; Fourth official: Samrit Ritkaew

1 November 2023	Wiang Sa Surat Thani City (T3)	5–1	Bangkapi (TA)	Wiang Sa, Surat Thani
15:00 (UTC+7)	Kritsada Jarujreet 13'; Natthawut Aiamchan 20', 60'; Suttipong Yaifai 32'; Toloba Aremu Kassim Mouyidine 52' (pen.)	Report	Phongphan Srikate 27' (o.g.)	Stadium: Ban Song Subdistrict Municipality Stadium; Attendance: 400; Referee: Tiwakorn Sawangpong; Assistant referees: Hafit Chamnian, Bunya Mahankrit; Fourth official: Nattawut Sangpan

1 November 2023	Maraleina (T3)	1–3	Uttaradit Saksiam (T3)	Khlong Luang, Pathum Thani
15:00 (UTC+7)	Thiwakon Seegun 19'	Report	Arsan Pengbanrai 4'; Chainarong Samuttha 22'; Chayawut Putta 68'	Stadium: Stadium of Valaya Alongkorn Rajabhat University under the Royal Patronage; Referee: Kittichai Huthip; Assistant referees: Patcharapon Losomsup, Kittichok Huthip; Fourth official: Narapat Nittayachat

1 November 2023	Surin City (T3)	6–1	Nong Khae Police (TA)	Mueang, Surin
15:00 (UTC+7)	Watthanapon Chinthong 19', 52'; Jattuphon Nueakaew 37', 75'; Nitiphum Pralomram 56'; Pathomkan Tanngam 83'	Report	Parkphum Massamrong 62'	Stadium: Sri Narong Stadium; Attendance: 85; Referee: Pongdanai Sadsadee; Assistant referees: Komkrit Sawong, Phanu Phalhaphon; Fourth official: Wassana Onkhamlun

1 November 2023	Marines (T3)	2–2 (a.e.t.) (4–5 p)	MH Nakhon Si City (T3)	Sattahip, Chonburi
15:00 (UTC+7)	Worachet Prapaipak 20'; Cláudio 120+2' (pen.)	Report	Naruephon Proomimas 17'; Wuttichai Aladwaree 114'	Stadium: Sattahip Navy Stadium; Attendance: 115; Referee: Palathip Homwarn; Assistant referees: Adisai Pongnairat, Jeerapat Arinpeng; Fourth official: Monruedee Junmai
	Penalties
	Thoedphong Cherkhao (penalty scored); Rachata Tongdonpum (penalty scored); Akaradet Rattanasri (penalty missed); Natthachai Rakkamnoed (penalty scored); Cláudio (penalty scored)		(penalty scored) Siwakorn Kidkayan; (penalty scored) Thiraphat Khwanrot; (penalty scored) Wuttichai Aladwaree; (penalty scored) Omogba Esoh; (penalty scored) Edson dos Santos Costa Júnior

1 November 2023	Kalasin United (TA)	2–2 (a.e.t.) (3–4 p)	Udon Thani City (TA)	Mueang, Kalasin
15:00 (UTC+7)	Satianpong Kanfung 62', 73'	Report	Watcharapong Pakpiphruk 85' (pen.); Oatsadawut Chanoon 89'	Stadium: Kalasin Town Municipality Stadium; Attendance: 80; Referee: Warakorn Suraporn; Assistant referees: Jakkaphat Senjanta, Kornthip Riyaboot; Fourth official: Sineenuch Ngoipang
	Penalties
	Oadsadawut Kaewrubsri (penalty scored); Puwadon Pujampa (penalty missed); Nattanon Ritphad (penalty scored); Phiphatphon Mongkhoichu (penalty scored); Amonrit Wankahad (penalty missed)		(penalty scored) Oatsadawut Chanoon; (penalty scored) Thawisak Kidraksa; (penalty missed) Chaiwat Singlo; (penalty scored) Watcharapong Pakpiphruk; (penalty scored) Pitiwat Sombut

1 November 2023	Nakhon Si United (T2)	0–1	Bangkok United (T1)	Mueang, Nakhon Si Thammarat
17:00 (UTC+7)		Report; Highlight	Everton 28'	Stadium: Nakhon Si Thammarat Provincial Stadium; Attendance: 1,559; Referee: Wiwat Jumpaoon; Assistant referees: Chotrawee Tongduang, Khomchalach Lekhawijit; Fourth official: Satchukorn Saenchu

1 November 2023	Samut Sakhon City (T3)	2–0	Uthai Thani (T1)	Mueang, Samut Sakhon
17:00 (UTC+7)	Alex Mermoz Djatche Nandje 85'; Techin Mooktarakosa 90+4'	Report		Stadium: Stadium of Thailand National Sports University, Samut Sakhon Campus; Attendance: 355; Referee: Anusorn Nookaew; Assistant referees: Watthana Chonchanakul, Sumate Peasiri; Fourth official: Veeraporn Maophaeo

1 November 2023	Sisaket United (T3)	9–0	ST Youth (TA)	Mueang, Sisaket
17:00 (UTC+7)	Piyanath Chanrum 33'; Panigazzi Matías Ignacio 37'; Carlos Damian dos Santos Puentes 41', 59'; Nitipat Kansorn 49'; Phattharapong Phengchaem 53'; Watchara Chanthai 74', 80'; Nonthawat Chaotai 87'	Report		Stadium: Sri Nakhon Lamduan Stadium; Attendance: 264; Referee: Rutratchapoom Moolpong; Assistant referees: Chindanai Cha-umphan, Limonfine Poxpong; Fourth official: Chinnawat Kottai

1 November 2023	Songkhla (T3)	2–1	Mahanakon Khon Kaen (TA)	Mueang, Songkhla
17:00 (UTC+7)	Anurak Wongnaree 10' (o.g.); Sanan Samala 90+1'	Report	Chanatip Krainara 17' (o.g.)	Stadium: Tinsulanon Stadium; Attendance: 828; Referee: Matoha Sayo; Assistant referees: Yuaidee Cheming, Sofuwan Salae; Fourth official: Pornsak Paksan

1 November 2023	Ratchaburi (T1)	6–0	Kasetsart (T2)	Mueang, Ratchaburi
17:30 (UTC+7)	Njiva Rakotoharimalala 48', 50', 52'; Giovanni Sio 73', 87'; Kiatisak Jiamudom 90+1' (pen.)	Report; Highlight		Stadium: Dragon Solar Park; Attendance: 503; Referee: Kotchapoom Meesridaecha; Assistant referees: Kasama Loyma, Banpot Khunhong; Fourth official: Phadoongkiat Piangdee

1 November 2023	Ayothaya Warrior (TS)	1–3	Nongbua Pitchaya (T2)	Phra Nakhon Si Ayutthaya, Ayutthaya
18:00 (UTC+7)	Tanet Saengthong 20'	Report	Panupong Phuakphralap 39'; Piyaphon Phanichakul 58'; Thanawut Phochai 90+5'	Stadium: Ayutthaya Provincial Stadium; Attendance: 200; Referee: Sila Jinnigorn; Assistant referees: Sahatnet Deemongkol, Thanet Jairaw; Fourth official: Natthwut Nammuang

1 November 2023	Dome (TS)	0–1	AUU Inter Bangkok (T3)	Khlong Luang, Pathum Thani
18:00 (UTC+7)		Report	Tanasorn Janthrakhot 75'	Stadium: Thammasat Stadium; Attendance: 125; Referee: Nattaphak Sawasdee; Assistant referees: Watchara Wongkhan, Apiwich Mukdahan; Fourth official: Panuwat Weawkum

1 November 2023	Phatthalung (T3)	1–2	Lamphun Warriors (T1)	Mueang, Phatthalung
18:00 (UTC+7)	Jhonatan Bernardo 83' (pen.)	Report	Maung Maung Lwin 10'; Dennis Murillo 59' (pen.)	Stadium: Phatthalung PAO. Stadium; Attendance: 1,600; Referee: Noppadet Mangngam; Assistant referees: Binla Preeda, Suriya Lee-intr; Fourth official: Sapuding Kalong

1 November 2023	Phitsanulok (T3)	0–4	Muangthong United (T1)	Mueang, Phitsanulok
18:00 (UTC+7)		Report; Highlight	Theerapat Laohabut 29'; Kannarin Thawornsak 55'; Teeraphol Yoryoei 66'; Jaroensak Wonggorn 90+3'	Stadium: Phitsanulok PAO. Stadium; Attendance: 2,854; Referee: Chaireag Ngam-som; Assistant referees: Worapong Prasartsri, Waranyoo Chomgoson; Fourth official: Sarayut Jakngoen

1 November 2023	Suphanburi (T2)	2–2 (a.e.t.) (4–2 p)	Kamphaengphet (T3)	Mueang, Suphanburi
18:00 (UTC+7)	Norraseth Lukthong 78'; Kittipong Wongma 83'	Report	Kawin Nuanthat 46'; Nattaphat Noynonmueng 49'	Stadium: Suphanburi Provincial Stadium; Attendance: 752; Referee: Chaikrit Inboonsong; Assistant referees: Siwat Chaithong, Kittipon Meeporn; Fourth official: Nasri Tamat
	Penalties
	Gustavo Alexandre Barbosa do Nascimento (penalty scored); Wasan Homsan (penalty scored); Akarawit Saemaram (penalty scored); Kittipong Wongma (penalty scored)		(penalty scored) Sakonwat Srithapak; (penalty scored) Ratthapong Aocharot; (penalty missed) Phaetthik Aetkinsan; (penalty missed) Nattaphat Noynonmueng

1 November 2023	Rayong (T2)	4–1	Roi Et PB United (TS)	Mueang, Rayong
18:00 (UTC+7)	Lwin Moe Aung 3'; Jetsada Batchari 50'; Tiago Chulapa 61', 73'	Report	Komsan Nikulram 88'	Stadium: Rayong Provincial Stadium; Attendance: 340; Referee: Peeratat Kittikanmetee; Assistant referees: Kantrakorn Ngaosri, Kittinan Sotorphrphakorn; Fourth official: Wicharn Klinthaworn

1 November 2023	Lampang (T2)	1–1 (a.e.t.) (4–3 p)	Rajpracha (T3)	Mueang, Lampang
18:00 (UTC+7)	Jirayu Saenap 51'	Report	Srithai Bookok 81'	Stadium: Lampang Provincial Stadium; Attendance: 450; Referee: U-sen Yala; Assistant referees: Phariwat Phoyoo, Kiadtisak Janmol; Fourth official: Kriangkrai Thiphanunjarukorn
	Penalties
	Luan Santos (penalty scored); Caio Rodrigues da Cruz (penalty missed); Kantapon Sompittanurak (penalty scored); Pannathon Mungmai (penalty scored); Chatri Rattanawong (penalty scored)		(penalty scored) Srithai Bookok; (penalty scored) Sosuke Kimura; (penalty missed) Samuel Erik Strong; (penalty missed) Nattaphon Bunchu; (penalty scored) Kueanun Junumpai

1 November 2023	Bangkok (T3)	1–0	Romklao United (TA)	Thung Khru, Bangkok
18:00 (UTC+7)	Kunakorn Wongpinij 51' (o.g.)	Report		Stadium: 72nd Anniversary Stadium, Bang Mot; Attendance: 400; Referee: Pichit Thongjanmoon; Assistant referees: Natthakit Konfu, Jasada Tongkam; Fourth official: Dassakhon Hokla

1 November 2023	Trat (T1)	1–2	Samut Prakan City (T2)	Mueang, Trat
18:00 (UTC+7)	Yashir Islame 80'	Report	Suphaphon Sutthisak 24'; Fernando Viana 56'	Stadium: Trat Provincial Stadium; Attendance: 1,214; Referee: Warintron Sassadee; Assistant referees: Tanin Reunjit, Srisuwan Boonnum; Fourth official: Akom Charoensuk

1 November 2023	Nakhon Ratchasima Mazda (T2)	2–3 (a.e.t.)	Sukhothai (T1)	Mueang, Nakhon Ratchasima
18:00 (UTC+7)	Deyvison Fernandes de Oliveira Silvério 21'; Somkaet Kunmee 77'	Report	Nelson Bonilla 45+2', 55'; Rafael Galhardo 120+4'	Stadium: His Majesty the King's 80th Birthday Anniversary Stadium; Attendance: 540; Referee: Sivakorn Pu-udom; Assistant referees: Rachan Dawangpa, Chaiya Sripak; Fourth official: Krisda Luangyos

1 November 2023	Phitsanulok Unity (T3)	2–0	Roi Et 2018 (TA)	Mueang, Phichit
18:00 (UTC+7)	Anucha Phantong 48', 84'	Report		Stadium: Phichit Provincial Stadium; Attendance: 82; Referee: Tanyathon Phetch-udom; Assistant referees: Suwit Kongtongnok, Phichayut Noitathong; Fourth official: Thanaporn Ouicharoen

1 November 2023	Chiangmai United (T2)	5–0	Nakhon Si City (TA)	Mae Rim, Chiangmai
18:00 (UTC+7)	Karn Jorates 1'; Warayut Klomnak 10', 65'; Than Paing 20'; Sarawut Sintupun 53' (pen.)	Report		Stadium: 700th Anniversary of Chiangmai Stadium; Attendance: 288; Referee: Kristin Saisombat; Assistant referees: Nissan Janthep, Waranon Soonsuwan; Fourth official: Woottipong Ketkam

1 November 2023	Chiangrai United (T1)	5–2	BFB Pattaya City (T3)	Mueang, Chiangrai
18:30 (UTC+7)	Fellipe Cabral Veloso dos Santos 7'; Bill 26', 40'; Suriya Singmui 45+1'; Theerapat Theerachotsakun 81' (o.g.)	Report; Highlight	Nattapong Karuna 10'; Achirawat Saimee 66'	Stadium: Leo Chiangrai Stadium; Attendance: 2,261; Referee: Paisan Bendem-alee; Assistant referees: Apichit Nophuan, Phubes Lekpha; Fourth official: Tastarawut Khantavichai

1 November 2023	PT Prachuap (T1)	2–1	Police Tero (T1)	Mueang, Prachuap Khiri Khan
18:30 (UTC+7)	Samuel 71', 90' (pen.)	Report; Highlight	Isaac Honny 12'	Stadium: Sam Ao Stadium; Attendance: 423; Referee: Mongkolchai Pechsri; Assistant referees: Vichet Getkaew, Yossapon Tongprom; Fourth official: Pongthep Raipimai

1 November 2023	Pattaya United (T2)	0–1 (a.e.t.)	BG Pathum United (T1)	Bang Lamung, Chonburi
19:00 (UTC+7)		Report; Highlight	Chanathip Songkrasin 105+1'	Stadium: Nong Prue Stadium; Attendance: 3,009; Referee: Winat Phophat; Assistant referees: Tuwae-yusoh Kuji, Teerapon Sunyapluem; Fourth official: Ekkachai Phetcham

1 November 2023	Nakhon Pathom United (T1)	10–0	Thai Spirit (TA)	Mueang, Nakhon Pathom
19:00 (UTC+7)	Samuel Nnamani 1', 12', 13', 46', 56'; Nopphakao Prachobklang 21'; Sunchai Chaolaokhwan 28'; Kritsada Wongkaeo 41' (pen.), 53'; Phodchara Chainarong 72'	Report		Stadium: Stadium of Nakhon Pathom Municipality Sports School; Attendance: 751; Referee: Panumas Phansamo; Assistant referees: Pattarapong Kijsathit, Poonsawat Samransuk; Fourth official: Pawara Seejen

1 November 2023	Buriram United (T1)	2–1	Port (T1)	Mueang, Buriram
19:00 (UTC+7)	Goran Čaušić 45+2'; Lonsana Doumbouya 68'	Report; Highlight	Bordin Phala 57'	Stadium: Chang Arena; Attendance: 18,932; Referee: Phairot Bunkamnoed; Assistant referees: Tanate Chuchuen, Rawut Nakarit; Fourth official: Alongkorn Khonwai

1 November 2023	Chonburi (T1)	3–0	Khon Kaen United (T1)	Mueang, Chonburi
19:00 (UTC+7)	Phongsakon Trisat 39'; Channarong Promsrikaew 52'; Phanuphong Phonsa 90+1'	Report; Highlight		Stadium: Chonburi UTA Stadium; Attendance: 2,577; Referee: Niwat Insa-ard; Assistant referees: Chaowalit Poonprasit, Wirot Lokham; Fourth official: Wittaya Junejan

=== Second round ===
The second round would feature 32 clubs that were the winners of the first round including 11 clubs from T1, 7 clubs from T2, 13 clubs from T3, and 1 club from TA. This round was drawn on 23 November 2023. 52 goals occurred in this round.

20 December 2023	Saimit Kabin United (T3)	2–1 (a.e.t.)	Prime Bangkok (T3)	Kabin Buri, Prachinburi
15:00 (UTC+7)	Nuttapong Deeduaychat 59'; Cedrick Platini Kaham 99'	Report	Chawanwit Saelao 30' (pen.)	Stadium: Nomklao Maharat Stadium; Attendance: 187; Referee: Theerapon Nakthong; Assistant referees: Chaiwat Rupsa-at, Sukree Kurteng; Fourth official: Narit Mungtoemklang

20 December 2023	Lampang (T2)	1–3	Samut Sakhon City (T3)	Mueang, Lampang
15:00 (UTC+7)	Luan Santos 90+4'	Report	Nattapong Kumnaet 42'; Attapon Chommaleethanawat 52'; Sirichai Lamphuttha 62'	Stadium: Lampang Provincial Stadium; Attendance: 389; Referee: Piyapong Thongkhain; Assistant referees: Thitibodi Rumnet, Thanet Jairaw; Fourth official: Wathanyu Morin

20 December 2023	Udon Thani City (TA)	0–2	Nakhon Pathom United (T1)	Mueang, Udon Thani
15:00 (UTC+7)		Report	Adefolarin Durosinmi 69'; Chitpanya Tisud 90+4' (pen.)	Stadium: SAT Udon Thani Stadium; Attendance: 300; Referee: Wiwat Jumpaoon; Assistant referees: Pattarapong Kijsathit, Rachan Dawangpa; Fourth official: Prakasit Chantarasawang

20 December 2023	Suphanburi (T2)	0–2	Phitsanulok Unity (T3)	Mueang, Suphanburi
15:00 (UTC+7)		Report	Selwan Al-Jaberi 26', 45+1'	Stadium: Suphanburi Provincial Stadium; Attendance: 347; Referee: Pongthep Raipimai; Assistant referees: Khomchalach Lekhawijit, Kiadtisak Janmol; Fourth official: Wittaya Junejan

20 December 2023	Surin City (T3)	2–0	Chiangrai United (T1)	Mueang, Surin
15:00 (UTC+7)	Nattapong Pookdee 87', 90+5'	Report; Highlight		Stadium: Sri Narong Stadium; Attendance: 589; Referee: Paisan Bendem-alee; Assistant referees: Apichit Nophuan, Tanin Reunjit; Fourth official: Anupong Duangsri

20 December 2023	Wiang Sa Surat Thani City (T3)	0–0 (a.e.t.) (4–5 p)	Udon United (T3)	Wiang Sa, Surat Thani
15:00 (UTC+7)		Report		Stadium: Ban Song Subdistrict Municipality Stadium; Attendance: 110; Referee: Matoha Sayo; Assistant referees: Muhammadsaiyukee Seena, Fadeen Adae; Fourth official: Anon Lohlor
	Penalties
	Toloba Aremu Kassim Mouyidine (penalty scored); Amnuai Nueaoon (penalty scored); Suttipong Yaifai (penalty scored); Natthakit Keawphutphong (penalty scored); Kasemsan Chaiphakdee (penalty missed); Thirapon Hadsatud (penalty missed)		(penalty missed) Sakda Noppakdee; (penalty scored) Surasak Somrat; (penalty scored) Niwat Nonkao; (penalty scored) Sorathorn Chainamuang; (penalty scored) Andrey Coutinho; (penalty scored) Thanathip Paengwong

20 December 2023	AUU Inter Bangkok (T3)	1–4	Chiangmai United (T2)	Min Buri, Bangkok
15:00 (UTC+7)	Rata Kachasen 47'	Report	Pattara Soimalai 45+3', 90+4'; Marlon Henrique Brandão da Silva 55'; Choe Ho-ju 65'	Stadium: 72nd Anniversary Stadium, Min Buri; Attendance: 85; Referee: Wichate Tainthong; Assistant referees: Kittipon Meeporn, Nattphon Chuensamran; Fourth official: Peeratat Kittikanmetee

20 December 2023	Uttaradit Saksiam (T3)	1–2 (a.e.t.)	Buriram United (T1)	Mueang, Uttaradit
15:00 (UTC+7)	Kittisak Wantawee 38'	Report; Highlight	Seksan Ratree 2'; Peeradon Chamratsamee 97'	Stadium: Uttaradit Provincial Stadium; Attendance: 2,106; Referee: Chaireag Ngam-som; Assistant referees: Watthana Chonchanakul, Waranyoo Chomgoson; Fourth official: Peerasan Krataithong

20 December 2023	Sisaket United (T3)	0–2	Bangkok (T3)	Mueang, Sisaket
17:00 (UTC+7)		Report	Wachirawut Phudithip 40'; Sirodom Konsungnoen 73'	Stadium: Sri Nakhon Lamduan Stadium; Attendance: 333; Referee: Teeramate Pooprang; Assistant referees: Yodtawee Ridsri, Phichit Phoopanna; Fourth official: Payao Khuankhanueng

20 December 2023	Sukhothai (T1)	3–2 (a.e.t.)	Muangthong United (T1)	Mueang, Sukhothai
18:00 (UTC+7)	Jakkapong Polmart 36'; Nelson Bonilla 71' (pen.), 108'	Report	Weerathep Pomphan 26'; Stefan Šćepović 49'	Stadium: Thalay Luang Stadium; Attendance: 1,009; Referee: Songkran Bunmeekiart; Assistant referees: Tanate Chuchuen, Tuwae-yusoh Kuji; Fourth official: Sila Jinnigorn

20 December 2023	Songkhla (T3)	2–2 (a.e.t.) (5–3 p)	Rayong (T2)	Mueang, Songkhla
18:00 (UTC+7)	Apichat Eaidsrichay 10', 26'	Report	Tiago Chulapa 38'; Theppitak Pholjuang 64'	Stadium: Tinsulanon Stadium; Attendance: 312; Referee: Putthipong Issising; Assistant referees: Nissan Janthep, Songrit Trakulchai; Fourth official: Natthwut Nammuang
	Penalties
	Basree Sanron (penalty scored); Apdussalam Saman (penalty scored); Aliu Micheal Abdul (penalty scored); Bisrun Semuso (penalty scored); Suhaimee Roman (penalty scored)		(penalty scored) Siwakorn Sangwong; (penalty scored) Tiago Chulapa; (penalty missed) Yodrak Namuangrak; (penalty scored) Ryoma Ito

20 December 2023	Nongbua Pitchaya (T2)	1–2	Dragon Pathumwan Kanchanaburi (T2)	Mueang, Nongbua Lamphu
18:00 (UTC+7)	Apisit Saenseekhammuan 10'	Report	Jardel 44', 77'	Stadium: Pitchaya Stadium; Attendance: 1,014; Referee: Kriangkrai Thiphanunjarukorn; Assistant referees: Anucha Pinamon, Sarayut Sriampri; Fourth official: U-sen Yala

20 December 2023	PT Prachuap (T1)	2–1	Ratchaburi (T1)	Mueang, Prachuap Khiri Khan
18:00 (UTC+7)	Jirapan Phasukihan 59'; Saharat Kanyaroj 87'	Report; Highlight	Siwakorn Jakkuprasat 66'	Stadium: Sam Ao Stadium; Attendance: 1,025; Referee: Winat Phophat; Assistant referees: Binla Preeda, Srisuwan Boonnum; Fourth official: Pawara Seejen

20 December 2023	Lamphun Warriors (T1)	5–1	MH Nakhon Si City (T3)	Mueang, Lamphun
18:00 (UTC+7)	Anan Yodsangwal 9', 50', 69'; Natithorn Inntranon 13', 55'	Report	Ratthaphum Phankhechon 81'	Stadium: Lamphun Provincial Stadium; Attendance: 765; Referee: Kotchapoom Meesridaecha; Assistant referees: Phubes Lekpha, Suriya Lee-intr; Fourth official: Nasri Tamat

20 December 2023	Bangkok United (T1)	4–0	Samut Prakan City (T2)	Khlong Luang, Pathum Thani
19:00 (UTC+7)	Amadou Soukouna 26', 56'; Bassel Jradi 31'; Boontawee Theppawong 64'	Report		Stadium: Thammasat Stadium; Attendance: 1,036; Referee: Phairot Bunkamnoed; Assistant referees: Chaowalit Poonprasit, Yossapon Tongprom; Fourth official: Suriyo Kanhachalee

20 December 2023	Chonburi (T1)	2–2 (a.e.t.) (4–2 p)	BG Pathum United (T1)	Mueang, Chonburi
19:00 (UTC+7)	Channarong Promsrikaew 75'; Phithak Phimpae 112'	Report; Highlight	Ikhsan Fandi 41'; Danilo Alves 99'	Stadium: Chonburi UTA Stadium; Attendance: 2,723; Referee: Sivakorn Pu-udom; Assistant referees: Rawut Nakarit, Wirot Lokham; Fourth official: Ekkachai Phetcham
	Penalties
	Willian Lira (penalty scored); Kritsada Kaman (penalty scored); Lee Chan-dong (penalty scored); Yotsakorn Burapha (penalty scored)		(penalty scored) Jakkapan Praisuwan; (penalty missed) Danilo Alves; (penalty scored) Sarach Yooyen; (penalty missed) Igor Sergeev

=== Third round ===
The third round would feature 16 clubs that were the winners of the second round including 7 clubs from T1, 2 clubs from T2, and 7 clubs from T3. This round was drawn on 1 February 2024. 29 goals occurred in this round.

28 February 2024	Udon United (T3)	1–1 (a.e.t.) (4–3 p)	Surin City (T3)	Mueang, Udon Thani
15:00 (UTC+7)	Danuson Wijitpunya 3'	Report; Highlight	Watthanapon Chinthong 75' (pen.)	Stadium: Stadium of Thailand National Sports University, Udon Thani Campus; Attendance: 102; Referee: Chairat Phooalai; Assistant referees: Teeramate Pooprang, Tanakorn Chaikanya; Fourth official: Kittichot Worasan
	Penalties
	Rakpong Chumuang (penalty scored); Natthaphon Wisetchat (penalty scored); Sorathorn Chainamuang (penalty scored); Sompong Saisoda (penalty missed); Surasak Somrat (penalty scored)		(penalty missed) Komen Sangsamanan; (penalty scored) Surasak Bunjan; (penalty scored) Adisorn Bunloet; (penalty scored) Kitsanaphat Kingkaeo; (penalty missed) Aphidet Sawaengsuk

28 February 2024	Samut Sakhon City (T3)	2–2 (a.e.t.) (5–4 p)	Chiangmai United (T2)	Mueang, Samut Sakhon
17:00 (UTC+7)	Carlos 7' (pen.); Patiphan Pinsermsootsri 17'	Report; Highlight	Sarawut Sintupun 54'; Than Paing 73'	Stadium: Stadium of Thailand National Sports University, Samut Sakhon Campus; Attendance: 256; Referee: Chaikrit Inboonsong; Assistant referees: Nissan Janthep, Nattphon Chuensamran; Fourth official: Kriangkrai Thiphanunjarukorn
	Penalties
	Welington Adão Cruz (penalty scored); Sirichai Lamphuttha (penalty scored); Pongsil Tana (penalty scored); Chayaphat Srirat (penalty scored); Nattapong Kumnaet (penalty scored)		(penalty missed) Karn Jorates; (penalty scored) Chonlawit Kanuengkid; (penalty scored) Thanakorn Navanit; (penalty scored) Thanawich Thanasasipat; (penalty scored) Anucha Chaiwong

28 February 2024	PT Prachuap (T1)	1–1 (a.e.t.) (2–4 p)	Lamphun Warriors (T1)	Mueang, Prachuap Khiri Khan
18:00 (UTC+7)	Derley 79'	Report; Highlight	Tauã Ferreira dos Santos 73'	Stadium: Sam Ao Stadium; Attendance: 1,246; Referee: Wiwat Jumpaoon; Assistant referees: Rachain Srichai, Chotrawee Tongduang; Fourth official: Satchukorn Saenchu
	Penalties
	Samuel (penalty scored); Derley (penalty missed); Peerawat Akkratum (penalty scored); Prasid Jantum (penalty missed)		(penalty scored) Baworn Tapla; (penalty scored) Sila Srikampang; (penalty scored) Anan Yodsangwal; (penalty missed) Mohammed Osman; (penalty scored) Tauã Ferreira dos Santos

28 February 2024	Sukhothai (T1)	3–1	Saimit Kabin United (T3)	Mueang, Sukhothai
18:00 (UTC+7)	Chaowasit Sapysakunphon 8', 24'; Baggio Rakotonomenjanahary 90+2'	Report; Highlight	Emerson Felipe Alves Peixoto de Almeida 41' (pen.)	Stadium: Thalay Luang Stadium; Attendance: 619; Referee: Chaireag Ngam-som; Assistant referees: Worapong Prasartsri, Watthana Chonchanakul; Fourth official: Alongkorn Khonwai

28 February 2024	Phitsanulok Unity (T3)	0–1 (a.e.t.)	Dragon Pathumwan Kanchanaburi (T2)	Mueang, Phitsanulok
18:00 (UTC+7)		Report; Highlight	Pichitchai Sienkrathok 118'	Stadium: Phitsanulok PAO. Stadium; Attendance: 160; Referee: Atiwat Seelalo; Assistant referees: Anucha Pinamon, Natthawut Tasmak; Fourth official: U-sen Yala

28 February 2024	Songkhla (T3)	2–2 (a.e.t.) (4–5 p)	Bangkok United (T1)	Mueang, Songkhla
19:00 (UTC+7)	Pornthep Heemla 51'; Abdulhafis Nibu 85'	Report; Highlight	Rungrath Poomchantuek 36'; Everton 68'	Stadium: Tinsulanon Stadium; Attendance: 7,125; Referee: Sivakorn Pu-udom; Assistant referees: Pattarapong Kijsathit, Tanin Reunjit; Fourth official: Kristin Saisombat
	Penalties
	Ekene Victor Azike (penalty scored); Victor Clemente de Oliveira Capinan (penalty scored); Aliu Micheal Abdul (penalty scored); Adam Lassamano (penalty missed); Akrom Mamood (penalty scored)		(penalty scored) Willen; (penalty scored) Thossawat Limwannasathian; (penalty scored) Everton; (penalty scored) Weerathep Pomphan; (penalty scored) Rungrath Poomchantuek

28 February 2024	Bangkok (T3)	5–4	Buriram United (T1)	Thung Khru, Bangkok
19:00 (UTC+7)	Eydison 2'; Carlos Eduardo dos Santos Lima 48', 49', 69'; Wachirawut Phudithip 90+14'	Report; Highlight	Lucas Crispim 29'; Lonsana Doumbouya 32', 90+7'; Theerathon Bunmathan 90+10'	Stadium: 72nd Anniversary Stadium, Bang Mot; Attendance: 7,264; Referee: Kotchapoom Meesridaecha; Assistant referees: Chaowalit Poonprasit, Binla Preeda; Fourth official: Vitsavet Sangnakorn

28 February 2024	Chonburi (T1)	2–1	Nakhon Pathom United (T1)	Mueang, Chonburi
19:00 (UTC+7)	Caion 14'; Murilo 39'	Report; Highlight	Kittisak Phutchan 57'	Stadium: Chonburi UTA Stadium; Attendance: 2,738; Referee: Natee Choosuwan; Assistant referees: Tanate Chuchuen, Vichet Getkaew; Fourth official: Komgrit Ponpasit

=== Quarter-finals ===
The quarter-finals would feature 8 clubs that were the winners of the third round including 4 clubs from T1, 1 club from T2, and 3 clubs from T3. This round was drawn on 7 March 2024. 11 goals occurred in this round.

10 April 2024	Udon United (T3)	1–1 (a.e.t.) (5–3 p)	Chonburi (T1)	Mueang, Udon Thani
15:30 (UTC+7)	Romário Reginaldo Alves 61'	Report; Highlight	Amadou Ouattara 90'	Stadium: Stadium of Thailand National Sports University, Udon Thani Campus; Attendance: 591; Referee: Sarayut Jakngoen; Assistant referees: Komsan Kampan, Waranyoo Chomgoson; Fourth official: Sahapop Sriboonlue
	Penalties
	Romário Reginaldo Alves (penalty scored); Andrey Coutinho (penalty scored); Natthaphon Wisetchat (penalty scored); Satrayu Sikuancha (penalty scored); Surasak Somrat (penalty scored)		(penalty scored) Willian Lira; (penalty scored) Chalermpong Kerdkaew; (penalty missed) Phanuphong Phonsa; (penalty scored) Channarong Promsrikaew

10 April 2024	Samut Sakhon City (T3)	3–3 (a.e.t.) (3–2 p)	Bangkok (T3)	Mueang, Samut Sakhon
17:00 (UTC+7)	Welington Adão Cruz 63', 90+5'; Pongsil Tana 120'	Report; Highlight	Wichaya Pornprasart 35', 56', 113' (pen.)	Stadium: Stadium of Thailand National Sports University, Samut Sakhon Campus; Attendance: 420; Referee: Winat Phophat; Assistant referees: Poonsawat Samransuk, Tanin Reunjit; Fourth official: Noppadet Mangngam
	Penalties
	Carlos (penalty missed); Sirichai Lamphuttha (penalty scored); Aekkaphon Fangnongdu (penalty scored); Chayaphat Srirat (penalty missed); Nattapong Kumnaet (penalty scored)		(penalty missed) Kittitach Pranithi; (penalty scored) Phubordee Buangam; (penalty missed) Kiangsak Taobutr; (penalty scored) Sirodom Konsungnoen; (penalty missed) Thananat Rungrampan

10 April 2024	Dragon Pathumwan Kanchanaburi (T2)	2–0	Sukhothai (T1)	Mueang, Kanchanaburi
18:00 (UTC+7)	Elias 58'; Jirasak Kumthaisong 63'	Report; Highlight		Stadium: Kanchanaburi Provincial Stadium; Attendance: 312; Referee: Kotchapoom Meesridaecha; Assistant referees: Pattarapong Kijsathit, Chaowalit Poonprasit; Fourth official: Satchukorn Saenchu

10 April 2024	Bangkok United (T1)	1–0	Lamphun Warriors (T1)	Khlong Luang, Pathum Thani
19:00 (UTC+7)	Vander 90+5'	Report; Highlight		Stadium: Thammasat Stadium; Attendance: 1,370; Referee: Sivakorn Pu-udom; Assistant referees: Rawut Nakarit, Tanate Chuchuen; Fourth official: Vitsavet Sangnakorn

=== Semi-finals ===
The semi-finals would feature 4 clubs that were the winners of the quarter-finals including 1 club from T1, 1 club from T2, and 2 clubs from T3. This round was drawn on 11 April 2024. 9 goals occurred in this round.

8 May 2024	Dragon Pathumwan Kanchanaburi (T2)	3–1	Samut Sakhon City (T3)	Mueang, Ratchaburi
18:00 (UTC+7)	Ricardo Pires 25'; Ittipol Akpatcha 54'; Phanthamit Praphanth 67'	Report; Highlight	Patiphan Pinsermsootsri 23'	Stadium: Dragon Solar Park; Attendance: 1,445; Referee: Warintron Sassadee; Assistant referees: Tanate Chuchuen, Apichit Nophuan; Fourth official: Noppadet Mangngam

8 May 2024	Bangkok United (T1)	5–0	Udon United (T3)	Mueang, Chonburi
19:00 (UTC+7)	Thossawat Limwannasathian 22'; Willen 29' (pen.), 72'; Rakpong Chumuang 37' (o.g.); Rungrath Poomchantuek 90+3'	Report; Highlight		Stadium: Chonburi UTA Stadium; Attendance: 462; Referee: Wiwat Jumpaoon; Assistant referees: Pattarapong Kijsathit, Rachain Srichai; Fourth official: Winat Phophat

=== Final ===
The final would feature 2 clubs that were the winners of the semi-finals including 1 club from T1 and 1 club from T2. 2 goals occurred in this round.

15 June 2024	Bangkok United (T1)	1–1 (a.e.t.) (4–1 p)	Dragon Pathumwan Kanchanaburi (T2)	Mueang, Ratchaburi
18:00 (UTC+7)	Vander 74' (pen.)	Report; Highlight	Ricardo Pires 65'	Stadium: Dragon Solar Park; Attendance: 3,833; Referee: Songkran Bunmeekiart; Assistant referees: Tanate Chuchuen, Apichit Nophuan; Fourth official: Warintron Sassadee
	Penalties
	Vander (penalty scored); Mahmoud Eid (penalty scored); Everton (penalty scored); Adisak Kraisorn (penalty scored)		(penalty missed) Elias; (penalty missed) Phanthamit Praphanth; (penalty scored) Pichitchai Sienkrathok

== Tournament statistics ==
=== Top goalscorers ===
Rank	Player	Club	Goals
1	(Nigeria) Samuel Nnamani	Nakhon Pathom United	5
2	(Brazil) Carlos Eduardo dos Santos Lima	Bangkok	4
2	(Brazil) Júnior Batista	Dragon Pathumwan Kanchanaburi	4
2	(Thailand) Jirayu Saenap	Lampang	4
2	(Thailand) Chawanwit Saelao	Prime Bangkok	4
2	(Thailand) Jonah Natan Duchowny	Rayong	4
2	(El Salvador) Nelson Bonilla	Sukhothai	4
8	(Thailand) Wichaya Pornprasart	Bangkok	3
8	(Guinea) Lonsana Doumbouya	Buriram United	3
8	(Thailand) Anan Yodsangwal	Lamphun Warriors	3
8	(Thailand) Kitichai Tunnoofaeb	Prime Bangkok	3
8	(Japan) Sosuke Kimura	Rajpracha	3
8	(Thailand) Thapoppon Butkaew	Rajpracha	3
8	(Madagascar) Njiva Rakotoharimalala	Ratchaburi	3
8	(Thailand) Jetsada Batchari	Rayong	3
8	(Brazil) Tiago Chulapa	Rayong	3
8	(Thailand) Watthanapon Chinthong	Surin City	3
8	(Thailand) Pitipong Wongbut	Udon United	3

=== Hat-tricks ===
Player	For	Against	Result	Date	Round
(Thailand) Kitichai Tunnoofaeb	Prime Bangkok (T3)	Chachoengsao Hi-Tek (T3)	4–0 (H)	4 October 2023	Qualification round
(Thailand) Jonah Natan Duchowny^{4}	Rayong (T2)	Uthumphon Chullamanee (TA)	9–1 (A)	4 October 2023	Qualification round
(Thailand) Thapoppon Butkaew	Rajpracha (T3)	K.5 Viwat Group (TA)	7–0 (H)	4 October 2023	Qualification round
(Japan) Sosuke Kimura	Rajpracha (T3)	K.5 Viwat Group (TA)	7–0 (H)	4 October 2023	Qualification round
(Thailand) Jirayu Saenap	Lampang (T2)	Samut Prakan United (TA)	6–0 (H)	4 October 2023	Qualification round
(Brazil) Júnior Batista^{4}	Dragon Pathumwan Kanchanaburi (T2)	Namphong United (TA)	13–0 (H)	4 October 2023	Qualification round
(Madagascar) Njiva Rakotoharimalala	Ratchaburi (T1)	Kasetsart (T2)	6–0 (H)	1 November 2023	First round
(Nigeria) Samuel Nnamani^{5}	Nakhon Pathom United (T1)	Thai Spirit (TA)	10–0 (H)	1 November 2023	First round
(Thailand) Anan Yodsangwal	Lamphun Warriors (T1)	MH Nakhon Si City (T3)	5–1 (H)	20 December 2023	Second round
(Brazil) Carlos Eduardo dos Santos Lima	Bangkok (T3)	Buriram United (T1)	5–4 (H)	28 February 2024	Third round
(Thailand) Wichaya Pornprasart	Bangkok (T3)	Samut Sakhon City (T3)	3–3 (a.e.t.) (2–3 p) (A)	10 April 2024	Quarter-finals

Notes: ^{5} = Player scored 5 goals; ^{4} = Player scored 4 goals; (H) = Home team; (A) = Away team

== See also ==
- 2023–24 Thai League 1
- 2023–24 Thai League 2
- 2023–24 Thai League 3
- 2023–24 Thai League 3 Northern Region
- 2023–24 Thai League 3 Northeastern Region
- 2023–24 Thai League 3 Eastern Region
- 2023–24 Thai League 3 Western Region
- 2023–24 Thai League 3 Southern Region
- 2023–24 Thai League 3 Bangkok Metropolitan Region
- 2023–24 Thai League Cup
- 2023–24 Thai League 3 Cup
- 2023 Thailand Champions Cup
