= 2023–24 Thai League 2 =

Thai League 2
- Season: 2023–24
- Dates: 11 August 2023 – 25 May 2024
- Champions: Nakhon Ratchasima; 2nd Thai League 2 title
- Promoted: Nakhon Ratchasima; Nongbua Pitchaya; Rayong
- Relegated: Chiangmai; Krabi; Customs United
- Matches: 306
- Goals: 831 (2.72 per match)
- Top goalscorer: Deyvison Fernandes (22 goals)
- Biggest home win: 9 goals totals Nongbua Pitchaya 10–1 Kasetsart (25 February 2024)
- Biggest away win: 5 goals totals Customs United 1–6 Rayong (21 October 2023)
- Highest scoring: 12 goals totals Rayong 8–4 Samut Prakan City (21 April 2024)
- Longest winning run: 6 matches Nakhon Ratchasima; Nongbua Pitchaya
- Longest unbeaten run: 19 matches Nakhon Ratchasima
- Longest winless run: 12 matches Krabi
- Longest losing run: 6 matches Krabi
- Highest attendance: 24,556; Nakhon Ratchasima 3–0 Nongbua Pitchaya (20 April 2024)
- Lowest attendance: 121; Customs United 0–0 Krabi (10 February 2024)
- Total attendance: 350,314
- Average attendance: 1,149
- All statistics correct as of 27 April 2024.

The 2023–24 Thai League 2 was the 26th season of the Thai League 2, the second-tier professional league for Thailand's association football clubs, since its establishment in 1997. A total of 18 teams competed in the league. The season began on 11 August 2023 and concluded on 23 June 2024.

For this season two teams in the final table (champion and runner up) were directly promoted to Thai League 1 next season while teams ranked 3rd – 6th qualified in play off for last spot in top tier next season.

== Team changes ==
The following teams have changed division since the 2022–23 season.

=== To Thai League 2 ===
Promoted from Thai League 3

- Chanthaburi
- DP Kanchanaburi
- Pattaya United

Relegated from Thai League 1

- Nakhon Ratchasima
- Nongbua Pitchaya
- Lampang

=== From Thai League 2 ===
Promoted to Thai League 1

- Nakhon Pathom
- Trat
- Uthai Thani

Relegated to Thai League 3

- Rajpracha
- Ranong United

Relegated to Thailand Amateur League

- Udon Thani

=== Renamed Clubs ===
- Pattaya Dolphins United renamed to Pattaya United

== Teams ==
Locations of the 2023–24 Thai League 2 teams
Football clubs in Bangkok Metropolitan Region

== Stadium and locations ==
Team	Province	Stadium	Capacity
Ayutthaya United	Ayutthaya	Ayutthaya Provincial Stadium	6,000
Chainat Hornbill	Chainat	Khao Plong Stadium	8,625
Chanthaburi	Chanthaburi	Chanthaburi Provincial Stadium	5,000
Chiangmai	Chiang Mai	Chiangmai Municipality Stadium	5,000
Chiangmai United	Chiang Mai	700th Anniversary Stadium	25,000
Customs United	Samut Prakan	Customs Department Stadium, Ladkrabang 54	2,000
DP Kanchanaburi	Kanchanaburi	Kleeb Bua Stadium	13,000
Kasetsart	Bangkok	Insee Chantarasatit Stadium	3,275
Krabi	Krabi	Krabi Provincial Stadium	6,000
Lampang	Lampang	Lampang Provincial Stadium	5,500
Nakhon Ratchasima	Nakhon Ratchasima	80th Birthday Stadium	24,641
Nakhon Si United	Nakhon Si Thammarat	Nakhon Si Thammarat PAO. Stadium	5,000
Nongbua Pitchaya	Nongbua Lamphu	Pitchaya Stadium	6,000
Pattaya United	Chonburi (Bang Lamung)	Nong Prue Stadium	5,838
Phrae United	Phrae	Huai Ma Stadium	3,000
Rayong	Rayong	Rayong Provincial Stadium	7,500
Samut Prakan City	Samut Prakan	Samut Prakarn SAT Stadium	5,130
Suphanburi	Suphanburi	Suphan Buri Provincial Stadium	15,279

=== Personnel and sponsoring ===
Note: Flags indicate national team as has been defined under FIFA eligibility rules. Players may hold more than one non-FIFA nationality; Club dissolved during season would shown by grey background.

Team	Manager	Captain	Kit	Sponsor
Ayutthaya United	(Australia) Danny Invincibile	(Thailand) Nantawat Kokfai	(Spain) Kelme	Gulf; Chang; Muang Thai Life Assurance
Chainat Hornbill	(Thailand) Sumeth Yooto	(Thailand) Mongkonchai Kongjumpa	(Thailand) Warrix	Wangkanai; AirAsia; Kubota
Chanthaburi	(Thailand) Supachai Komsilp	(Thailand) Yannarit Sukcharoen	(Thailand) MSeven	Rock$Presso
Chiangmai	(Thailand) Nattapon Krachangpho (interim)	(Brazil) Stênio Júnior	(Spain) Kelme	Aniruth; AirAsia
Chiangmai United	(Thailand) Surachai Jirasirichote	(Thailand) Thanawich Thanasasipat	(Thailand) Ideo Sport	VBeyond; Muang Thai Life Assurance; Chang
Customs United	(Thailand) Prasobchoke Chokemor	(Thailand) Phattharaphon Kangsopa	(Malaysia) Eepro	Leo; Muang Thai Life Assurance
DP Kanchanaburi	(Thailand) Somchai Makmool	(Thailand) Anuphan Koedsompong	(Thailand) Versus	Huawei; Dragon Solar Roof; Werd
Kasetsart	(Thailand) Pattaraphon Naprasert	(South Korea) Park Hyun-woo	(Thailand) YG	Tanowsri Traditional Chicken; Atlantic
Krabi	(Thailand) Arnon Bandasak	(Thailand) Akarat Punkaew	(Thailand) WOW Sport	Phi Phi Harbour View Hotel
Lampang	(Thailand) Kitthachai Wongsim	(Thailand) Seeket Madputeh	(Thailand) Ego Sport	Pitchaya; Bangkok Airways
Nakhon Ratchasima	(Thailand) Teerasak Po-on	(Thailand) Nattapong Sayriya	(Thailand) Volt	Mazda; Leo; CP; Central Plaza; Gulf
Nakhon Si United	(Thailand) Harnarong Chunhakunakorn	(Thailand) Prakit Deeprom	(Thailand) Warrix	Leo; Lion Air
Nongbua Pitchaya	(Thailand) Sukrit Yothee	(Thailand) Nuttawut Khamrin	(Thailand) Ego Sport	Pitchaya; Thai-Denmark
Pattaya United	(Thailand) Surachart Sing-Ngon	(Thailand) Supakit Niamkong	(Thailand) Volt	Mittare Insurance; Leo
Phrae United	(Thailand) Thongchai Rungreangles	(Thailand) Rangsiman Sruamprakam	(Thailand) YG	Phrae Sila; SAMART; Chang; Muang Thai Life Assurance
Rayong	(Thailand) Pipob On-Mo	(Thailand) Wasusiwakit Phusirit	(Thailand) 2S Sport	Singer; Leo; WHA Group
Samut Prakan City	(Brazil) Wanderley Junior	(Thailand) Ronnachai Rangsiyo	(Italy) Kappa	Chang
Suphanburi	(Thailand) Sarawut Treephan	(Thailand) Jetjinn Sriprach	(Thailand) Volt	Chang

== Foreign players ==
Players name in bold indicates the player was registered during the mid-season transfer window.

Club	Player 1	Player 2	Player 3	Asian Player	ASEAN Player	Former
Ayutthaya United	(Brazil) André Luís	(Brazil) **João Paulo**	(Liberia) Moussa Sanoh	(South Korea) **Jung Myung-oh**		(Lithuania) Karolis Laukžemis (South Korea) Sung Min-an
Chainat Hornbill	(Brazil) **Nixon Guylherme**	(Japan) Ryuji Hirota	(Republic of Ireland) **Clyde O'Connell**	(South Korea) Jeong Ja-in		(Australia) Ata Inia (Japan) Shota Fujishiro
Chanthaburi	(Brazil) Patrick Mota	(Brazil) **Pedro Paulo**		(South Korea) **Go Seul-ki**	(Philippines) Bienvenido Marañón	(Brazil) Artur (Brazil) Wander Luiz (Japan) Taiga Matsunaga
Chiangmai	(Brazil) **Alef**	(Brazil) Stênio Júnior	(South Korea) Lim Chang-gyoon	(South Korea) Yoo Byung-soo		(Spain) David Cuerva
Chiangmai United	(Brazil) Marlon	(Brazil) Mosquito	(Venezuela) Jeffrén Suárez	(South Korea) **Lim Jae-hyeok**	(Myanmar) Than Paing	(South Korea) Choi Ho-ju
Customs United	(Brazil) **Artur**	(Egypt) **Waleed Adel**		(Japan) **Taiga Matsunaga**		(Ivory Coast) Chomana Coulibaly (Ivory Coast) Mohamed Kouadio (Mali) Boubacar Koné
DP Kanchanaburi	(Brazil) **Elias**	(Brazil) Jeferson	(Brazil) **Ricardo Pires**	(South Korea) Park Jae-hyeong	(Cambodia) Sengtong Rattanavilay	(Brazil) Júnior Batista (Brazil) Jardel
Kasetsart	(Brazil) **Ailton**	(Japan) Ryosuke Nagasawa	(Saint Kitts and Nevis) **Tishan Hanley**	(South Korea) Park Hyun-woo	(Myanmar) Aee Soe	(Brazil) Cristian Alex (South Korea) Lee Jong-cheon
Krabi	(Brazil) **Jô**	(Brazil) **Lucas Massaro**	(Brazil) **Ramon Mesquita**	(Iran) Hamed Bakhtiari	(Philippines) **Kristófer Reyes**	(Liberia) Keith Nah (Nigeria) Julius Chukwuma
Lampang	(Brazil) Caio	(Brazil) Léo	(Brazil) Luan	(South Korea) **Kim Joo-chan**		(South Korea) Lim Jae-hyeok
Nakhon Ratchasima	(Brazil) Deyvison	(France) Greg Houla	(Uganda) Melvyn Lorenzen	(Iraq) Abbas Mohamad	(Myanmar) **Aung Kaung Mann**	
Nakhon Si United	(Brazil) Rodrigo Maranhão	(Brazil) **Nilson**	(Brazil) Valdo	(South Korea) Kwon Dae-hee	(Laos) Soukaphone Vongchiengkham	(Brazil) Pedro Paulo
Nongbua Pitchaya	(Brazil) **Júnior Batista**	(Brazil) **Jardel**	(Croatia) Aleksandar Kapisoda	(Japan) Kento Nagasaki		(Brazil) Nilson (Jamaica) Deshorn Brown
Pattaya United	(Brazil) **Cristian Alex**	(Brazil) Alex Flávio	(Brazil) Judivan	(Japan) **Ryota Endo**	(Myanmar) **Suan Lam Mang**	(Argentina) Nicolás Vélez (Oman) Badar Al-Alawi
Phrae United	(Brazil) Patrick Cruz	(Brazil) Lucas Daubermann	(Brazil) **Erivelto**	(Australia) **Ata Inia**		(Brazil) Elias (Myanmar) Kyaw Ko Ko (South Korea) Yeon Gi-sung
Rayong	(Brazil) Tiago Chulapa	(Brazil) **Rafael Galhardo**	(Japan) Ryoma Itō	(Japan) Hiromichi Katano	(Myanmar) Lwin Moe Aung	(Nepal) Manish Dangi
Samut Prakan City	(Brazil) Bianor	(Brazil) Fernando Viana	(South Korea) Lee Sang-jin	(Japan) Sho Shimoji	(Myanmar) **Sithu Aung**	
Suphanburi	(Brazil) Gustavinho	(Brazil) **Thiago Henrique**	(Cameroon) Florent Obama	(Japan) Yuki Bamba		

=== Dual citizenship/heritage players ===
Overseas Thai players whom have obtained a Thai passport are regarded as local players.

Club	Player 1	Player 2	Player 3
Ayutthaya United	(Germany) (Thailand) **Marcel Sieghart**^{2}		
Chainat Hornbill			
Chanthaburi			
Chiangmai	(Switzerland) (Thailand) **Charyl Chappuis**^{2}^{3}	(Switzerland) (Thailand) **Chitchanok Xaysensourinthone**^{2}	
Chiangmai United	(Liberia) (Thailand) **Olaxon A Tamba**^{2}		
Customs United	(Australia) (Thailand) **James Shanahan**^{2}	(Italy) (Thailand) **Antonio Verzura**^{2}	(Norway) (Thailand) **Håvar Dahl**^{2}
DP Kanchanaburi	(England) (Thailand) **Louis May**^{2}	(Germany) (Thailand) **Wisut Jultanu**^{2}	(Switzerland) (Thailand) **Richard Gertsch**^{2}
Kasetsart			
Krabi			
Lampang			
Nakhon Ratchasima			
Nakhon Si United	(Sweden) (Thailand) **Gustav Sahlin**^{2}	(United States) (Thailand) **Samuel Cunningham**^{2}	
Nongbua Pitchaya			
Pattaya United			
Phrae United			
Rayong	(Sweden) (Thailand) **Anders Forsling**^{2}		
Samut Prakan City			
Suphanburi			

Notes:

^2 Carrying Thai heritage.
^3 Capped for Thailand.

== League table ==
=== Standings ===
Pos	Team	Pld	W	D	L	GF	GA	GD	Pts	Qualification or relegation
1	Nakhon Ratchasima Mazda (C, P)	34	21	10	3	64	27	+37	73	Promotion to 2024–25 Thai League 1
2	Nongbua Pitchaya (P)	34	22	6	6	80	39	+41	72	Promotion to 2024–25 Thai League 1
3	Rayong (O, P)	34	16	12	6	62	34	+28	60	Qualification for promotion play-offs
4	Chiangmai (R)	34	17	8	9	55	34	+21	59 (Note: Chiangmai is ahead on the head-to-head record; Chiangmai 3 pts (GD +1), Nakhon Si United 3 pts (GD -1).)	Relegation to 2024–25 Thai League 3 (Note: Chiangmai was administratively relegated to the 2024–25 Thai League 3 for failing to meet Club Licensing standards.)
5	Nakhon Si United	34	16	11	7	60	40	+20	59	Qualification for promotion play-offs
6	Ayutthaya United	34	16	9	9	52	36	+16	57	Qualification for promotion play-offs
7	Pattaya United	34	15	10	9	45	36	+9	55	
8	Lampang	34	15	9	10	50	41	+9	54	
9	Chiangmai United	34	12	13	9	52	41	+11	49	
10	Suphanburi	34	12	7	15	36	41	−5	43	
11	Phrae United	34	11	7	16	37	53	−16	40 (Note: Phrae United is ahead on the head-to-head record; Phrae United 4 pts, Chanthaburi 1 pt.)	
12	Chanthaburi	34	9	13	12	44	44	0	40	
13	Dragon Pathumwan Kanchanaburi	34	10	8	16	43	52	−9	38	
14	Chainat Hornbill	34	9	10	15	32	46	−14	37	
15	Samut Prakan City	34	8	11	15	39	57	−18	35	
16	Kasetsart (Note: Kasetsart remained in the league after Chiangmai failed to meet the Club Licensing criteria for the 2024–25 season, resulting in Kasetsart retaining their spot.)	34	6	4	24	31	84	−53	22	
17	Customs United (R)	34	4	9	21	26	63	−37	21	Relegation to 2024–25 Thai League 3
18	Krabi (R)	34	3	11	20	23	63	−40	20	Relegation to 2024–25 Thai League 3

Source: Thai League
Rules for classification: 1) Points; 2) Head-to-head points; 3) Head-to-head goals difference; 4) Head-to-head goals scored; 5) Overall goals difference; 6) Overall goals scored; 7) Fair play points; 8) Play-off without extra time).
(C) Champions; (O) Play-off winners; (P) Promoted; (R) Relegated

=== Promotion play-offs ===
Semi-finals
5	Nakhon Si United	1	2	3
4	Chiangmai	0	2	2
6	Ayutthaya United	2	1	3
3	Rayong (a.e.t.)	1	4	5

Finals
Nakhon Si United	1	0	1
Rayong (a)	1	0	1

==== Semi-finals ====
4 May 2024
18:00 UTC+7

Nakhon Si United	1–0	Chiangmai
Nattapoom Maya 88'	Report; Highlight

Nakhon Si Thammarat Provincial Stadium,
Mueang, Nakhon Si Thammarat
Attendance: 1,760
Referee: Pawara Seejen (Thailand)
11 May 2024
18:00 UTC+7

Chiangmai	2–2	Nakhon Si United
Lim Chang-gyoon 28'; Yoo Byung-soo 89' (pen.)	Report	Rodrigo Maranhão 24'; Alef 70' (o.g.)

Chiangmai City Municipality Stadium,
Mueang, Chiangmai
Attendance: 2,850
Referee: Wittaya Junejan (Thailand)

Nakhon Si United won 3–2 on aggregate.

5 May 2024
18:00 UTC+7

Ayutthaya United	2–1	Rayong
Passakorn Biaothungnoi 25'; André Luís 66' (pen.)	Report	Tiago Chulapa 88'

Phra Nakhon Si Ayutthaya Provincial Stadium,
Phra Nakhon Si Ayutthaya, Phra Nakhon Si Ayutthaya
Attendance: 1,499
Referee: Satchukorn Saenchu (Thailand)
12 May 2024
18:00 UTC+7

Rayong	4–1 (a.e.t.)	Ayutthaya United
Tiago Chulapa 24', 40'; Jetsada Batchari 103', 120'	Report; Highlight	João Paulo 66'

Rayong Provincial Stadium,
Mueang, Rayong
Attendance: 6,084
Referee: Chaikrit Inboonsong (Thailand)

Rayong won 5–3 on aggregate.

==== Finals ====
18 May 2024
18:00 UTC+7

Nakhon Si United	1–1	Rayong
Nantawat Suankaew 90+2'	Report	Rafael Galhardo 67'

Nakhon Si Thammarat Provincial Stadium,
Mueang, Nakhon Si Thammarat
Attendance: 3,145
Referee: Chaireag Ngam-som (Thailand)
25 May 2024
18:00 UTC+7

Rayong	0–0	Nakhon Si United
	Report

Rayong Provincial Stadium,
Mueang, Rayong
Attendance: 7,500
Referee: Niwat Insa-ard (Thailand)

1–1 on aggregate. Rayong won on away goal.

=== Positions by round ===
The table lists the positions of teams after each week of matches. In order to preserve chronological evolvements, any postponed matches are not included in the round at which they were originally scheduled, but added to the full round they were played immediately afterwards. For example, if a match is scheduled for matchday 13, but then postponed and played between days 16 and 17, it will be added to the standings for day 16.

Team ╲ Round	1	2	3	4	5	6	7	8	9	10	11	12	13	14	15	16	17	18	19	20	21	22	23	24	25	26	27	28	29	30	31	32	33	34
Nakhon Ratchasima	3	2	2	3	2	1	2	2	1	4	6	4	3	3	4	4	3	4	3	2	3	3	3	3	2	2	2	2	2	2	2	2	1	1
Nongbua Pitchaya	8	5	8	10	7	3	8	6	4	3	3	3	2	2	1	1	2	2	2	3	2	2	1	1	1	1	1	1	1	1	1	1	2	2
Rayong	6	4	5	7	4	4	6	9	7	6	7	7	6	5	5	5	5	5	5	5	5	5	5	5	5	4	5	5	5	5	5	3	3	3
Chiangmai	1	1	1	1	1	2	1	1	3	2	2	2	4	4	2	3	4	3	4	4	4	4	4	4	4	5	4	4	4	4	4	5	5	4
Nakhon Si United	7	15	11	11	12	9	5	4	6	5	1	1	1	1	3	2	1	1	1	1	1	1	2	2	3	3	3	3	3	3	3	4	4	5
Ayutthaya United	5	3	6	8	10	6	3	3	5	7	4	5	5	6	6	7	6	6	7	6	6	7	7	7	8	7	7	6	7	6	6	6	6	6
Pattaya United	13	9	4	2	5	7	4	7	8	9	12	12	10	9	7	6	7	7	6	7	7	6	6	6	6	6	6	7	6	7	8	8	8	7
Lampang	15	17	18	15	14	14	13	13	13	12	9	8	11	11	12	12	10	11	9	10	8	8	8	9	7	8	8	8	9	8	7	7	7	8
Chiangmai United	2	8	9	12	13	13	12	12	12	13	13	13	13	13	13	13	13	12	11	9	10	9	10	8	9	10	9	9	8	9	9	9	9	9
Suphanburi	12	6	7	4	3	5	7	5	2	1	5	6	7	7	8	9	9	8	10	11	11	12	13	12	10	9	10	10	12	11	10	11	10	10
Phrae United	11	12	10	6	11	8	11	11	11	8	8	10	8	10	11	10	11	10	12	13	13	11	12	11	12	11	12	12	10	12	11	12	12	11
Chanthaburi	17	7	3	5	8	12	14	14	14	14	14	14	14	16	14	14	14	14	14	15	15	15	15	13	15	14	11	11	11	10	12	10	11	12
DP Kanchanaburi	14	16	12	13	9	11	9	10	9	10	10	11	9	8	9	11	12	13	13	12	12	14	14	15	13	13	14	14	15	15	15	13	13	13
Chainat Hornbill	9	14	15	17	17	17	17	17	17	15	16	16	15	14	15	15	15	15	15	14	14	13	11	14	14	15	15	15	14	14	14	15	15	14
Samut Prakan City	4	10	14	9	6	10	10	8	10	11	11	9	12	12	10	8	8	9	8	8	9	10	9	10	11	12	13	13	13	13	13	14	14	15
Kasetsart	18	11	13	16	15	15	15	15	15	16	15	15	16	15	16	16	16	16	16	16	16	16	16	16	16	17	17	16	16	16	17	17	17	16
Customs United	16	18	17	14	16	16	16	16	16	17	17	17	18	18	18	17	17	17	17	17	17	17	17	17	17	16	16	17	18	18	16	16	16	17
Krabi	10	13	16	18	18	18	18	18	18	18	18	18	17	17	17	18	18	18	18	18	18	18	18	18	18	18	18	18	17	17	18	18	18	18

Leader and qualification to the 2024–25 Thai League
Promotion to the 2024–25 Thai League
Play off to the 2024–25 Thai League
Relegation to the 2024–25 Thai League 3

Source: Thai League 2

=== Results by match played ===
Team ╲ Round	1	2	3	4	5	6	7	8	9	10	11	12	13	14	15	16	17	18	19	20	21	22	23	24	25	26	27	28	29	30	31	32	33	34
Ayutthaya United	W	W	L	L	D	W	W	W	D	D	W	D	D	D	L	L	W	D	D	W	W	L	L	L	L	D	W	W	L	W	W	W	W	W
Chainat Hornbill	D	L	D	L	L	L	L	L	D	W	L	L	W	W	L	L	D	D	W	W	W	W	D	L	D	L	W	L	D	D	D	L	L	W
Chanthaburi	L	W	W	D	L	L	L	D	L	L	D	L	D	D	W	D	W	L	D	L	W	D	D	W	L	W	W	D	D	W	L	D	L	D
Chiangmai	W	W	W	D	W	D	W	L	L	W	D	W	L	W	W	D	D	W	L	W	L	W	L	W	L	L	W	W	W	D	L	D	W	D
Chiangmai United	W	L	D	L	L	D	W	D	D	L	W	D	L	L	W	D	W	D	W	D	L	W	D	W	D	L	D	W	W	D	D	W	L	W
Customs United	L	L	D	W	L	D	L	D	L	L	L	L	L	D	L	W	D	L	L	L	D	D	L	D	D	W	L	L	L	L	W	L	L	L
DP Kanchanaburi	L	L	W	D	W	D	W	L	W	L	D	D	W	D	D	L	L	L	D	W	L	L	L	L	W	W	L	L	L	D	L	W	W	L
Kasetsart	L	W	L	L	D	D	L	D	L	L	W	L	L	W	L	L	L	L	L	W	L	L	W	L	L	L	L	W	L	L	L	L	L	D
Krabi	D	L	L	L	L	L	L	D	L	L	L	D	W	D	L	L	L	L	D	D	D	L	W	D	D	L	D	L	W	L	L	D	L	L
Lampang	L	L	L	W	D	D	W	D	D	W	W	W	L	L	L	L	W	D	W	L	W	D	W	L	W	L	W	D	D	W	W	W	W	D
Nakhon Ratchasima	W	W	W	L	W	W	D	D	W	L	D	W	D	W	L	W	W	D	W	W	D	W	D	D	W	W	W	W	W	W	D	W	W	D
Nakhon Si United	D	L	W	D	D	W	W	W	D	W	W	W	W	D	D	W	W	W	D	W	L	W	D	L	D	L	W	W	L	D	D	L	W	L
Nongbua Pitchaya	D	W	L	D	W	W	L	W	W	W	D	W	W	D	W	W	L	W	W	L	W	W	W	W	W	W	D	W	D	W	W	L	L	W
Pattaya United	L	W	W	W	L	D	W	D	D	L	L	D	W	D	W	W	L	D	W	D	W	W	W	D	D	L	L	L	W	L	D	W	W	W
Phrae United	D	L	W	W	L	W	L	L	W	W	D	L	W	L	D	D	L	W	L	L	L	D	L	W	D	W	L	L	W	L	W	L	L	D
Rayong	W	W	L	D	W	D	D	L	W	W	D	D	D	W	W	W	D	W	L	L	W	L	D	W	D	W	D	W	D	L	W	W	W	D
Samut Prakan City	W	L	L	W	W	L	D	W	L	D	D	W	L	L	W	W	D	L	D	D	D	L	W	L	L	D	L	L	D	D	L	D	L	L
Suphanburi	D	W	D	W	W	L	D	W	W	W	L	L	L	L	D	L	D	W	L	L	L	L	L	W	W	W	L	L	L	W	D	L	W	D

Source: Thai League
W = Win; D = Draw; L = Lose

== Results ==
Home \ Away	AYU	CHB	CTB	CHM	CMU	CTU	DPK	KAS	KBI	LAM	NRM	NSU	NON	PAT	PRU	RAY	SPC	SPB
Ayutthaya United	—	1–2	1–3	0–2	0–0	1–0	3–2	1–1	1–2	2–2	2–2	2–0	2–0	3–0	3–1	1–2	2–2	2–0
Chainat Hornbill	1–5	—	3–2	2–2	1–1	1–0	1–0	3–0	3–1	2–0	0–1	0–0	1–2	1–4	1–2	0–3	0–0	1–2
Chanthaburi	1–1	1–0	—	1–1	3–3	1–0	1–1	4–1	2–0	1–1	1–1	4–1	2–3	1–0	1–2	1–1	0–0	2–0
Chiangmai	0–4	2–0	0–0	—	4–0	2–0	2–0	4–1	6–1	4–2	1–2	2–3	1–0	3–2	1–0	3–2	2–0	2–0
Chiangmai United	0–1	0–0	5–3	1–1	—	2–0	2–0	2–1	4–0	3–1	2–0	0–2	1–3	2–0	4–1	1–2	0–0	1–1
Customs United	1–1	0–0	1–0	2–1	1–3	—	2–0	1–2	0–0	3–3	1–3	1–2	2–3	1–3	0–1	1–6	0–3	0–0
DP Kanchanaburi	0–1	2–0	2–0	3–1	2–1	3–0	—	5–2	2–2	1–0	1–1	2–2	1–5	2–3	0–0	0–2	3–1	1–3
Kasetsart	1–3	1–0	1–1	1–1	1–1	0–1	3–0	—	0–1	1–6	1–4	0–1	2–4	1–2	1–0	0–2	3–1	0–3
Krabi	0–0	0–0	0–0	1–0	1–1	1–1	0–1	1–0	—	2–3	2–2	0–2	2–5	0–2	0–0	0–1	0–1	0–1
Lampang	2–1	1–1	2–1	2–1	1–1	1–1	1–0	0–1	1–0	—	1–0	3–1	1–0	1–2	3–1	1–1	3–0	2–1
Nakhon Ratchasima	1–0	1–1	2–0	1–0	2–2	4–1	3–1	1–0	1–0	2–0	—	2–1	3–0	0–0	5–0	0–0	5–1	3–0
Nakhon Si United	5–2	2–0	1–0	0–2	0–1	3–1	2–2	5–2	6–1	1–1	1–0	—	1–1	1–1	5–0	3–1	3–0	1–1
Nongbua Pitchaya	1–0	3–2	1–0	0–0	2–1	6–0	2–1	10–1	2–0	3–2	2–3	5–1	—	2–0	3–2	1–1	5–1	1–0
Pattaya United	1–2	0–0	3–1	1–0	2–2	2–1	1–1	3–0	1–1	0–0	1–1	0–0	1–1	—	1–3	1–0	1–2	2–0
Phrae United	0–1	0–2	2–2	1–1	1–1	2–1	2–1	3–0	5–2	0–1	1–2	1–2	2–0	1–0	—	0–3	1–0	0–0
Rayong	0–1	4–0	1–1	0–0	2–1	2–2	1–1	2–0	2–0	1–0	1–1	1–1	1–1	0–1	3–2	—	8–4	3–1
Samut Prakan City	1–1	1–2	1–2	0–1	2–1	0–0	0–1	4–2	2–2	2–0	1–3	1–1	1–1	1–2	3–0	1–1	—	1–0
Suphanburi	1–0	2–1	2–1	1–2	0–2	1–0	2–1	4–0	4–1	0–2	1–2	0–0	0–2	1–2	0–0	3–2	1–1	—

Updated to match(es) played on 27 April 2024. Source: Thai League
Legend: Blue = home team win; Yellow = draw; Red = away team win.

== Season statistics ==
=== Top scorers ===
As of 27 April 2024.

Rank	Player	Club	Goals
1	(Brazil) Deyvison Fernandes	Nakhon Ratchasima	22
2	(Brazil) Jardel Capistrano	DP Kanchanaburi (7 Goals); Nongbua Pitchaya (14 Goals)	21
3	(Brazil) Tiago Chulapa	Rayong	19
4	(Uganda) Melvyn Lorenzen	Nakhon Ratchasima	16
5	(Brazil) Rodrigo Maranhão	Nakhon Si United	14
5	(Brazil) Judivan	Pattaya United	14
7	(Brazil) André Luís Leite	Ayutthaya United	13
7	(Brazil) Mosquito	Chiangmai United	13
7	(France) Greg Houla	Nakhon Ratchasima	13
7	(Brazil) Júnior Batista	DP Kanchanaburi (8 Goals); Nongbua Pitchaya (5 Goals)	13
7	(Thailand) Chawin Srichan	Nongbua Pitchaya	13

=== Hat-tricks ===
Player	For	Against	Result	Date
(South Korea) Yoo Byung-soo	Chiangmai	Kasetsart	4–1 (H)	12 August 2023
(Brazil) Wander Luiz	Chanthaburi	Chiangmai United	3–5 (A)	1 October 2023
(Brazil) Gustavinho	Suphanburi	Kasetsart	4–0 (H)	22 October 2023
(Brazil) Rodrigo Maranhão	Nakhon Si United	Phrae United	5–0 (H)	12 November 2023
(Brazil) Patrick Cruz	Phrae United	Kasetsart	3–0 (H)	6 January 2024
(Brazil) Caio Tailândia	Lampang	Customs United	3–3 (A)	4 February 2024
(Thailand) Chawin Srichan	Nongbua Pitchaya	Kasetsart	10–1 (H)	25 February 2024
(Myanmar) Lwin Moe Aung	Rayong	Samut Prakan City	8–4 (H)	21 April 2024

=== Clean sheets ===
As of 27 April 2024.

Rank	Player	Club	Clean sheets
1	(Thailand) Fahas Bilanglod	Chiangmai	12
1	(Thailand) Tanachai Noorach	Nakhon Ratchasima	12
3	(Thailand) Noppakun Kadtoon	Rayong	11
4	(Thailand) Pairot Eiammak	Chiangmai United	9
5	(Thailand) Phuwadol Pholsongkram	Ayutthaya United	8
5	(Thailand) Kittisak Moosawat	Lampang	8
5	(Thailand) Chainarong Boonkerd	Pattaya United	8
8	(Thailand) Kiadtisak Chaodon	Chainat Hornbill	7
8	(Thailand) Chinnapong Raksri	DP Kanchanaburi	7
10	(Thailand) Samuel Cunningham	Nakhon Si United	6
10	(Thailand) Kittikun Jamsuwan	Nongbua Pitchaya	6
10	(Thailand) Jirunpong Thamsiha	Samut Prakan City	6
10	(Thailand) Sahawit Khumpiam	Suphanburi	6

== Attendances ==
=== Overall statistical table ===
Pos	Team	Total	High	Low	Average	Change
1	Nakhon Ratchasima	96,255	24,556	2,400	5,662	+41.1%
2	Chiangmai	35,561	3,212	1,150	2,092	+63.1%
3	Nongbua Pitchaya	28,699	3,265	968	1,686	−31.3%
4	Pattaya United	25,387	2,034	940	1,493	+137.4%
5	Nakhon Si United	23,015	2,080	989	1,354	−36.8%
6	Rayong	17,824	1,982	536	1,048	+6.3%
7	Suphanburi	16,548	1,542	571	973	−9.6%
8	Chainat Hornbill	15,052	1,496	622	941	−13.0%
9	Chanthaburi	14,208	1,754	437	836	+197.5%
10	DP Kanchanaburi	13,838	1,750	272	814	+126.7%
11	Chiangmai United	13,063	3,445	412	768	−13.1%
12	Lampang	11,269	1,015	398	663	−55.0%
13	Phrae United	8,549	956	391	503	−17.8%
14	Ayutthaya United	8,543	1,083	237	503	−40.5%
15	Samut Prakan City	7,075	847	241	416	+30.4%
16	Kasetsart	5,719	553	172	336	−32.4%
17	Krabi	4,904	520	130	288	−37.5%
18	Customs United	4,835	578	121	284	−32.9%
	League total	350,314	24,556	121	1,149	+37.1%

Updated to games played on 27 April 2024
Source: Thai League

=== Attendances by home match played ===
Team \ Match played	1	2	3	4	5	6	7	8	9	10	11	12	13	14	15	16	17	Total
Ayutthaya United	855	345	667	467	424	680	828	385	398	511	415	237	390	241	202	415	1,083	8,543
Chainat Hornbill	1,496	Unk.1	1,015	955	938	622	729	929	881	938	983	1,129	1,189	895	722	711	920	15,052
Chanthaburi	1,431	1,754	1,280	1,246	668	556	603	567	864	748	437	619	714	819	589	515	798	14,208
Chiangmai	2,719	3,085	2,359	1,886	2,286	1,948	2,051	3,212	2,364	2,042	2,011	1,745	2,265	1,798	1,345	1,295	1,150	35,561
Chiangmai United	889	642	412	556	564	552	591	634	577	582	654	599	560	508	3,445	643	655	13,063
Customs United	428	250	350	370	278	265	275	180	146	247	220	200	121	350	578	373	204	4,835
DP Kanchanaburi	272	1,750	985	1,223	1,062	1,091	1,106	1,004	917	807	765	631	662	547	480	223	313	13,838
Kasetsart	480	553	532	224	312	172	275	415	415	275	215	210	332	328	212	347	422	5,719
Krabi	520	430	380	245	450	178	250	250	310	270	415	183	310	253	160	130	170	4,904
Lampang	624	530	617	750	616	673	628	398	1,015	543	680	669	697	651	615	644	919	11,269
Nakhon Ratchasima	5,445	5,590	2,900	4,109	5,904	2,400	2,857	2,864	3,298	3,140	2,969	4,521	4,631	6,220	6,530	8,321	24,556	96,255
Nakhon Si United	2,080	1,415	1,425	1,200	1,570	1,540	990	1,126	1,236	989	1,270	1,270	1,315	2,015	1,199	1,280	1,095	23,015
Nongbua Pitchaya	2,179	2,733	1,956	968	1,805	1,648	1,306	1,339	1,468	1,356	1,294	1,213	1,235	1,311	1,607	1,986	3,265	28,669
Pattaya United	1,529	1,620	1,589	2,034	1,357	1,320	940	1,459	1,377	1,656	1,523	1,669	1,236	1,747	1,648	1,431	1,252	25,387
Phrae United	491	563	646	522	391	956	489	549	525	433	484	423	403	400	447	394	433	8,549
Rayong	1,613	1,205	1,194	960	758	862	536	579	657	620	876	911	937	1,293	1,982	1,522	1,319	17,824
Samut Prakan City	847	494	723	402	383	295	291	365	303	580	304	244	274	294	626	241	409	7,075
Suphanburi	1,542	1,499	1,293	1,365	1,218	1,150	647	880	829	839	915	768	718	695	1,030	589	571	16,548

Note:
Unk.1 Some error of T2 official match report 2 September 2023 (Chainat Hornbill 1–2 Phrae United).

== See also ==
- 2023–24 Thai League 1
- 2023–24 Thai League 3
- 2024 Thailand Amateur League
- 2023–24 Thai FA Cup
- 2023–24 Thai League Cup
- 2023 Thailand Champions Cup
