= Artur Vieira =

Brazilian footballer (born 1990)

Personal information
- Full name: Artur Jesus Vieira
- Date of birth: 11 June 1990 (age 36)
- Place of birth: Rio de Janeiro, Brazil
- Height: 1.90 m (6 ft 3 in)
- Position: Centre-back

Team information
- Current team: Adhyaksa Bekasi
- Number: 3

Youth career
- Portuguesa
- 2010: São Caetano

Senior career*
Years	Team	Apps	(Gls)
2011	Náutico	0	(0)
2012	União Mogi		
2013–2014	Atlético Goianiense	48	(1)
2015	Nova Iguaçu	0	(0)
2015	Fluminense	1	(0)
2016	América Mineiro	9	(0)
2016	Goiás	1	(0)
2017	Paraná Clube	0	(0)
2018	Boa	4	(0)
2019	Barito Putera	6	(0)
2020	Khon Kaen	12	(0)
2022	Hougang United	0	(0)
2022	Capital CF	0	(0)
2022	Mahasarakham SBT	6	(0)
2023	Kanchanaburi Power	16	(2)
2023	Chanthaburi	14	(0)
2024	Customs United	14	(0)
2024–2025	Deltras	19	(4)
2025–2026	Persipura Jayapura	24	(3)
2026–	Adhyaksa Bekasi	2	(0)
- * Club domestic league appearances and goals as of 18 September 2026

Artur Jesus Vieira (born 11 June 1990) is a Brazilian professional footballer who plays as a centre-back for Championship club Adhyaksa Bekasi.

== Career ==
Born in Rio de Janeiro, Artur graduated with São Caetano's youth setup, after a brief stint at Portuguesa. He joined Náutico in 2011, but failed to make a single appearance with the club.

In January 2013, after a year at União Mogi, Artur signed for Atlético Goianiense. On 1 February he renewed his contract, signing until 2016, and made his professional debut on 7 June, starting in a 1–0 home win against Paysandu.

On 10 October 2014 Artur scored his first professional goal, netting the winner in a 2–1 away success against Oeste. On 28 January 2015 he left the club, after having unpaid wages, and moved to Nova Iguaçu.

On 6 May 2015 Artur joined Fluminense.

In 2016, he was loaned to Goiás.

In 2019, he ventured into South East Asia and signed for Indonesia club, Barito Putera.

He went to Thailand after ending his season in Indonesia. But he was released after half a season.

He moved to Singapore Premier League club, Hougang United for the 2022 season. However, his contract was terminated before the season starts due to undisclosed reason. Speculation was that he did not manage to secure a work permit to play in Singapore.

== Career statistics ==
As of 18 September 2026

Appearances and goals by club, season and competition
Club	Season	League			Cup		Other		Total	
Club	Season	Division	Apps	Goals	Apps	Goals	Apps	Goals	Apps	Goals
AC Goianiense	2013; 2013	Série B Campeonato Goiano	23	0	3	0	13	0	39	0
AC Goianiense	2014; 2014	Série B Campeonato Goiano	25	1	3	0	12	0	40	1
AC Goianiense	Total		48	1	6	0	25	0	79	1
Fluminense	2015	Série A	1	0	0	0	0	0	1	0
América Mineiro	2016; 2016; 2016	Série A Campeonato Mineiro; Primeira Liga (Brazil)	9	0	2	0	5	0	16	0
Goiás	2016	Série B	1	0	0	0	0	0	1	0
Paraná	2017; 2017; 2017	Série B Campeonato Paranaense; Primeira Liga (Brazil)	0	0	0	0	6	0	6	0
Boa	2018	Série B	4	0	0	0	0	0	4	0
PS Barito Putera	2019	Liga 1	6	0	3	1	0	0	9	1
Khon Kaen	2020–21	Thai League 2	12	0	0	0	0	0	12	0
Hougang United	2022	Singapore Premier League	0	0	0	0	0	0	0	0
Mahasarakham SBT	2022–23	Thai League 3	6	0	0	0	0	0	6	0
DP Kanchanaburi	2022–23	Thai League 3	16	2	0	0	0	0	16	2
Chanthaburi	2023–24	Thai League 2	14	0	0	0	0	0	14	0
Customs United	2023–24	Thai League 2	14	0	0	0	0	0	14	0
Deltras	2024–25	Liga 2	19	4	0	0	0	0	19	4
Persipura Jayapura	2025–26	Championship	24	3	0	0	0	0	24	3
Adhyaksa Bekasi	2026–27	Championship	2	0	0	0	0	0	2	0
Career total			176	10	11	1	36	0	223	11

== Honours ==
Atlético Goianiense

- Campeonato Goiano: 2013, 2014

Dragon Pathumwan Kanchanaburi

- Thai League 3 Western Region: 2022–23
