= Pannarai Pansiri =

Thai football manager (born 1997)

Personal information
- Full name: Pannarai Pansiri
- Date of birth: 9 January 1997 (age 29)
- Place of birth: Bangkok, Thailand

Team information
- Current team: Kanchanaburi Power (team analyst)

Managerial career
- Years: Team
- 2015: Loei City (youth)
- 2020: Bangkok United (youth)
- 2020–2022: Kanchanaburi Power
- 2022: Muangkan United (technical director)
- 2022: Kanchanaburi Power
- 2022–2024: Chainat Hornbill
- 2025: Hougang United (assistant)
- 2025–2026: Hougang United
- 2025–: Kanchanaburi Power (team analyst)

Pannarai Pansiri (Thai: พันธุ์นารายณ์ พันธุ์ศิริ; born 9 January 1997) is a Thai professional football manager who is the Team analyst of Thai League 2 club Kanchanaburi Power.

== Early life ==
Pansiri was born on 9 January 1997 in Thailand. Growing up, he aspired to become a football manager.

== Managerial career ==
Pansiri started his managerial career as a youth manager of Thai side Loei City at the age of eighteen in 2015. In 2020, he was appointed as a youth manager of Thai side Bangkok United. The same year he was appointed manager of Thai side Kanchanaburi Power.

Following his stint there, he was appointed technical director of Thai side Muangkan United in 2022. The same year, he was appointed manager of Thai side Chainat Hornbill. During the summer of 2025, he was appointed as an assistant manager of Singaporean side Hougang United before being appointed manager of the club that October.
