= Watcharin Nuengprakaew =

Thai footballer (born 1996)

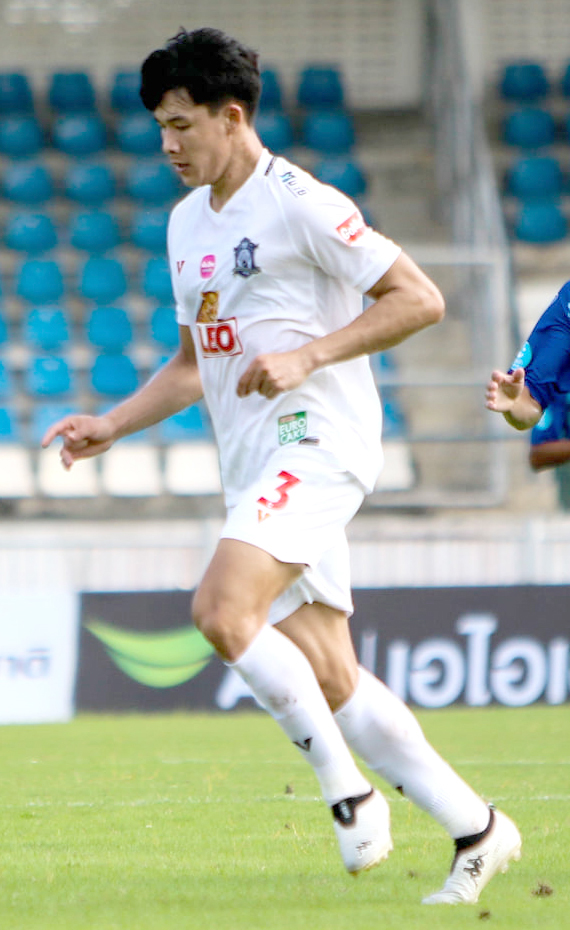

Personal information
- Full name: Watcharin Nuengprakaew
- Date of birth: 18 January 1996 (age 30)
- Place of birth: Nakhon Ratchasima, Thailand
- Height: 1.90 m (6 ft 3 in)
- Position: Centre-back

Team information
- Current team: Bangkok
- Number: 5

Senior career*
Years	Team	Apps	(Gls)
2015–2017	Thai Honda	3	(0)
2017–2019	Chiangrai United	2	(0)
2018	→ Sisaket (loan)		
2018	→ JL Chiangmai United (loan)		
2019	→ Chiangmai (loan)	0	(0)
2019	→ Rayong (loan)	16	(0)
2020	Rayong	12	(0)
2020–2021	Sukhothai	6	(0)
2021–2022	Chiangmai	18	(0)
2022–2023	Nakhon Si United	17	(1)
2023–2025	Nakhon Ratchasima	34	(0)
2025–	Bangkok	12	(0)
2025–	→ Nakhon Ratchasima (loan)	0	(0)
- * Club domestic league appearances and goals as of 15 June 2025

Watcharin Nuengprakaew (Thai: วัชรินทร์ เนื่องพระแก้ว, born 18 January 1996) is a Thai professional footballer who plays as a centre-back for the Thai League 1 club Nakhon Ratchasima.

== Honours ==
Chiangrai United

- Thai FA Cup: 2017

Nakhon Ratchasima

- Thai League 2: 2023–24
