= Clyde O'Connell =

Irish football player (born 1998)

Personal information
- Date of birth: 29 June 1998 (age 28)
- Place of birth: Republic of Ireland
- Position: Centre-back

Team information
- Current team: A'Ali
- Number: 5

Youth career
- 2018: Limerick

Senior career*
Years	Team	Apps	(Gls)
2018–2019	Regional United		
2019–2020	Limerick	9	(1)
2020–2021	Fairview Rangers		
2021–2022	Treaty United	20	(2)
2022	Preah Khan Reach Svay Rieng		(5)
2022–2023	→ Young Elephants (loan)	11	(5)
2024	Chainat Hornbill	12	(4)
2024–2025	Chanthaburi	13	(1)
2025–	A'Ali	9	(4)
- * Club domestic league appearances and goals as of 17 May 2025

Clyde O'Connell (born 29 June 1998) is an Irish professional footballer who plays as a centre-back for Bahraini Premier League club A'Ali.

== Club career ==
=== League of Ireland ===
A product of the Limerick youth system, O'Connell went on to make eight appearances for the senior team in the League of Ireland First Division and featured once for the Super Blues in the FAI Cup. He later played in the League of Ireland First Division again for newly-formed side Treaty United, making 21 appearances in all competitions, scoring two goals.

=== Preah Khan Reach Svay Rieng ===
In February 2022, O'Connell left Treaty United to sign for Cambodian Premier League club Preah Khan Reach Svay Rieng FC, a move that saw him join up with former Limerick youth coach Conor Nestor.

=== Young Elephants ===
Clyde O'Connell joined Lao League 1 club Young Elephants on loan at the start of the 2023 season. They finished the campaign unbeaten to claim the title, as O'Connell became the first Irish male footballer to win Lao League 1.

In the 2023 campaign, O'Connell made 11 appearances, scoring five goals. He scored his first goal for the club on his fourth appearance, a towering headed finish in a dramatic 3–2 home victory over Ezra at the New Laos National Stadium. He netted the winning goals in his next two appearances, both 1-0 victories, against Lao Army and Luang Prabang. O'Connell scored his fourth and fifth goals on his ninth appearance, a 15–0 away victory over Viengchanh FC.

=== Chainat Hornbill ===
Thai League 2 club Chainat Hornbill announced O'Connell's arrival on 5 January 2024. On 7 January, he scored on his debut in a 1–1 away draw with Nakhon Ratchasima. O'Connell converted a 49th-minute penalty against Dragon Pathumwan Kanchanaburi on 27 January.

O'Connell was named Thai League 2 Player of the Month for January 2024. He contributed two goals as Chainat went unbeaten in four matches (three wins, one draw) and conceded just one goal.

He scored his third goal of the campaign on 2 March, a 69th-minute penalty in a 3–0 home victory against Kasetsart. He scored a looping header against Nongbua Pitchaya on 10 March.

=== Chanthaburi FC ===
O'Connell joined fellow Thai League 2 club Chanthaburi in July 2024.

=== A'Ali ===
O'Connell signed for A'Ali in the Bahraini Premier League in January 2025, and scored his first goal against Al-Khaldiya SC on 6 February. His second goal came in a 2–2 draw with Malkiya Club on 21 April, and his third in 1–1 draw with Bahrain SC on 1 May. The centre-back logged his fourth goal of the season on 17 May, turning in a stoppage-time winner in A'Ali's 1–0 league win against East Riffa Club.

== Honours ==
Young Elephants

- Lao League 1: 2023
