= Olaxson A Tamba =

Thai footballer (born 2003)

Personal information
- Full name: Olaxson A Tamba
- Date of birth: 10 June 2003 (age 23)
- Place of birth: Bangkok, Thailand
- Height: 1.80 m (5 ft 11 in)
- Positions: Forward; winger

Youth career
- 2016: Patumkongka School
- 2017–2019: Suankularb Wittayalai School
- 2020–2021: Sukhothai
- 2021–2022: Chiangmai United

Senior career*
Years	Team	Apps	(Gls)
2022–2023	Chiangmai United	0	(0)
2022	→ Chiangrai City (loan)	4	(0)
2022–2023	→ Metalac (loan)	1	(0)

International career
2018–2019	Thailand U16	4	(0)
2021	Thailand U19	6	(1)
2022–	Thailand U23	3	(0)
- * Club domestic league appearances and goals as of 5 November 2022

Olaxson A Tamba (Thai: โอลัคซอน เอ แทมบา; born 10 June 2003) is a Thai professional footballer who plays as a forward or a winger.

== Club career ==
A Tamba was born to Steven A Tamba, a former Liberian footballer, and a mother from Lopburi province. He started playing football at the Patumkongka School and Suankularb Wittayalai School, before joining Sukhothai in 2020.

After a short spell with Sukhothai, he joined Chiangmai United, who loaned him to Thai League 3 side Chiangrai City in 2022. On his return, he was again loaned out, this time to the Serbian side Metalac. He made his debut for Metalac in October 2022.

== International career ==
A Tamba has represented Thailand at under-16, under-19 and under-23 level.

== Career statistics ==
=== Club ===
As of 5 November 2022.

Appearances and goals by club, season and competition
Club	Season	League			Cup		Other		Total	
Club	Season	Division	Apps	Goals	Apps	Goals	Apps	Goals	Apps	Goals
Chiangrai City (loan)	2022–23	Thai League 3	4	0	0	0	0	0	4	0
Metalac (loan)	2022–23	Serbian First League	1	0	1 (Note: Appearances in the Serbian Cup)	0	0	0	2	0
Chiangmai United	2023–24	Thai League 2	0	0	0	0	0	0	0	0
Career total			5	0	1	0	0	0	6	0
