= Ekkasit Chaobut =

Thai footballer (born 1991)

Personal information
- Full name: Ekkasit Chaobut
- Date of birth: 30 March 1991 (age 35)
- Place of birth: Phitsanulok, Thailand
- Height: 1.75 m (5 ft 9 in)
- Position: Midfielder

Team information
- Current team: Songkhla
- Number: 13

Youth career
- 2007–2009: Osotsapa

Senior career*
Years	Team	Apps	(Gls)
2009–2014	Osotsapa	21	(0)
2013	→ Paknampho NSRU (loan)	19	(2)
2014	→ Bangkok (loan)	24	(0)
2014–2015	Songkhla United	21	(0)
2016	Chiangmai	10	(0)
2016–2017	Super Power Samut Prakan	20	(0)
2017–2023	Sukhothai	130	(1)
2023	Nakhon Ratchasima	10	(0)
2024	Sukhothai	14	(0)
2024–2025	Kanchanaburi Power	27	(3)
2025–	Songkhla	30	(1)

International career
2009	Thailand U19		
2011	Thailand U23		
- * Club domestic league appearances and goals as of 12 March 2025

Ekkasit Chaobut (Thai:เอกสิทธิ์ ฉาวบุตร), is a Thai footballer who plays for Songkhla in Thai League 2.
