= Abbas Mohamad =

Iraqi footballer

Personal information
- Full name: Abbas Yassin Mohamad
- Date of birth: 15 June 1998 (age 28)
- Place of birth: Borås, Sweden
- Height: 1.86 m (6 ft 1 in)
- Position: Defender

Team information
- Current team: Newroz SC

Youth career
- Borås Kings
- Elfsborg
- Kronängs

Senior career*
Years	Team	Apps	(Gls)
2015–2022	Norrby	77	(3)
2017	→Dalstorps (loan)	8	(0)
2018	→Vårgårda (loan)	2	(0)
2022	Dalkurd	5	(0)
2022–2023	GAIS Göteborg		
2023–2024	Nakhon Ratchasima	30	(1)
2024-	Newroz SC	7	(1)

International career^{‡}
2022–	Iraq	1	(0)
- * Club domestic league appearances and goals as of 28/12/24 @ 19:18(AEST) ‡ National team caps and goals as of 05:05, 27 September 2022 (UTC)

Abbas Yassin Mohamad (Arabic: عباس ياسين محمد; born 15 June 1998) is a footballer who last played for Nakhon Ratchasima as a defender. Born in Sweden, he is an international for the Iraq national team.

== Career ==
Mohamad is a youth product of Borås Kings, Elfsborg and Kronängs. He began his senior career in the Superettan with Norrby in 2015. On 9 March 2016, he extended his contract with Norrby for 2 more years. On 9 August 2017, he joined Dalstorps on loan for the season. In 2018, he again extended his contract for 3 more years and went on loan with Vårgårda. He transferred to Dalkurd on 1 August 2022.

On 12 December 2022, he joined GAIS on a two-year contract. Later that month, Mohamad made social media posts supporting controversial internet personality Andrew Tate, after Tate's arrest for human trafficking. On New Years Eve, GAIS released a statement saying that the club did not share his viewpoints and would be discussing his social media usage. Mohamad continued to make social media posts supporting Tate and on 7 January 2023, GAIS released a statement saying that he was no longer part of the club.

On 14 July 2023, he joined Nakhon Ratchasima for 1 season.

== International career ==
Born in Sweden, Mohamad is of Iraqi descent. He was called up to the senior Iraq national team for the 2022 Jordan International Tournament. On 23 September 2022, Alai made his first team debut for Iraq in a penalty shootout loss against Oman. He debuted in the tournament in a 1–0 win over Syria on 26 September 2022.

== Honours ==
Nakhon Ratchasima

- Thai League 2: 2023–24
