= Somprasong Promsorn =

Thai footballer

Personal information
- Full name: Somprasong Promsorn
- Date of birth: 30 May 1997 (age 29)
- Place of birth: Ubon Ratchathani, Thailand
- Height: 1.63 m (5 ft 4 in)
- Position: Left winger

Team information
- Current team: Phitsanulok
- Number: 14

Youth career
- 2013–2016: Sisaket Sports School
- 2016–2017: Leicester City
- 2017–2018: OH Leuven

Senior career*
Years	Team	Apps	(Gls)
2018	OH Leuven Reserves	0	(0)
2018	→ Port (loan)	2	(0)
2019–2021	Khon Kaen	43	(1)
2021	Ubon Kruanapat	8	(1)
2022	Sisaket	14	(3)
2022	Rajpracha	9	(0)
2023–	Phitsanulok	10	(1)
- * Club domestic league appearances and goals as of 11 March 2023

Somprasong Promsorn (Thai: สมประสงค์ พรมศร, born May 30, 1997) is a Thai professional footballer who plays as a left winger for Thai League 3 club Phitsanulok.

== Club career ==
=== Leicester City ===
In youth career he was trained for 2 years and a half at Leicester City in England.

== Honours ==
Phitsanulok

- Thai League 3 Northern Region: 2022–23
