= Lim Chang-gyoon =

South Korean footballer

Lim Chang-Gyoon
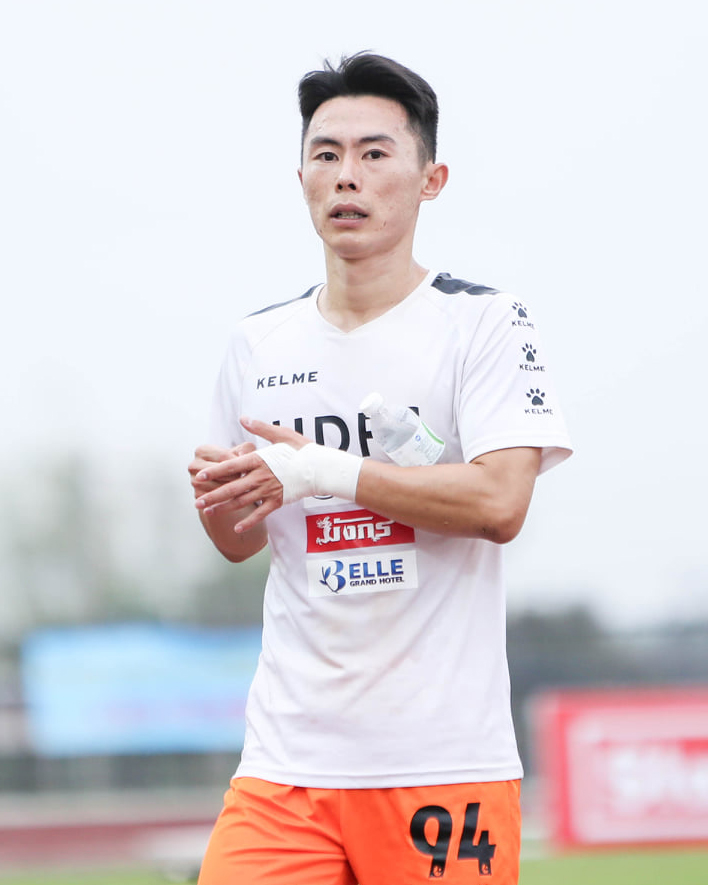
- Lim Chang-Gyoon playing for Udon Thani.

Personal information
- Full name: Lim Chang-Gyoon
- Date of birth: 19 April 1990 (age 36)
- Place of birth: South Korea
- Height: 1.73 m (5 ft 8 in)
- Position: Midfielder

Youth career
- Kyung Hee University

Senior career*
Years	Team	Apps	(Gls)
2013	Bucheon FC	32	(5)
2014–2016	Gyeongnam FC	58	(4)
2016–2020	Suwon FC	50	(4)
2018–2019	→ Asan Mugunghwa (army)	16	(2)
2020	Jeonnam Dragons	18	(1)
2021–2022	Udon Thani	32	(4)
2022–2024	Chiangmai	53	(12)
- * Club domestic league appearances and goals as of 30 April 2024

Lim Chang-Gyoon (Korean: 임창균; born 19 April 1990) is a South Korean footballer who plays as midfielder.

== Career ==
=== Bucheon FC 1995 ===
He was selected by Bucheon FC in 2013 K League Draft. He scored his debut goal on March 23 against Goyang Hi FC. During the season, he caps 32 games with 5 goals and 7 assists.

=== Gyeongnam FC ===
After 2013 season, he moved to Gyeongnam FC which is one of the K-League Classic teams.

=== Seongnam FC ===
In 2016 summer, he moved to Seongnam FC
