= Pongsakorn Takum =

Thai footballer (born 1992)

Personal information
- Full name: Pongsakorn Takum
- Date of birth: 20 August 1992 (age 34)
- Place of birth: Chiang Mai, Thailand
- Height: 1.73 m (5 ft 8 in)
- Position: Right-back

Team information
- Current team: Rayong
- Number: 23

Youth career
- –2017: Navy

Senior career*
| Years | Team | Apps | (Gls) |
| 2019 | JL Chiangmai | | |
| 2019– | Rayong | 95 | (0) |
- * Club domestic league appearances and goals as of 30 April 2023

Pongsakorn Takum (Thai: พงศกร ตาคำ; born August 20, 1992) is a Thai professional footballer who plays as a right-back for Thai League 2 club Rayong.
