= Kristófer Reyes =

Icelandic footballer

Personal information
- Full name: Kristófer Jacobson Stefánsdóttir Reyes
- Date of birth: May 24, 1997 (age 29)
- Place of birth: Akranes, Iceland
- Height: 1.83 m (6 ft 0 in)
- Position: Centre back

Team information
- Current team: Lampang
- Number: 17

Youth career
- Víkingur

Senior career*
| Years | Team | Apps | (Gls) |
| 2013–2016 | Víkingur | 6 | (0) |
| 2016–2019 | Fram Reykjavík | 34 | (0) |
| 2019–2021 | Víkingur | 29 | (1) |
| 2021–2022 | Fjölnir | 12 | (0) |
| 2022–2023 | Kórdrengir | 13 | (2) |
| 2023 | Ægir | 2 | (0) |
| 2023 | Þróttur Vogum | 7 | (0) |
| 2024 | Krabi | 16 | (1) |
| 2024– | Lampang | 2 | (0) |
- * Club domestic league appearances and goals as of 21 September 2024

Kristófer Jacobson Stefánsdóttir Reyes (born 24 May 1997) is an Icelandic professional footballer who plays as a centre back for Lampang in the Thai League 2.

== Career ==
=== Youth career ===
Reyes had his youth career at Víkingur.

=== Víkingur Ólafsvík ===
In December 2013, Reyes was promoted to the first team of Víkingur Ólafsvík.

In May 2014, Reyes made his debut for Víkingur in a 2–3 away win against KA Akureyri. He made a total of 6 games in his debut season with the first team.

=== Fram Reykjavík ===
In January 2016, after his two-year stint with Víkingur, Reyes joined fellow Inkasso-deildin side Fram Reykjavík. He made his debut for the club in a 2–0 away defeat against HK Kópavogur.

In January 2017, it was announced that Reyes have signed a two-year extension with Reykjavík keeping him with the club until December 2018.

In December 2018, he initially signed a contract to Thai League 1 club Ratchaburi Mitr Phol, but was later cancelled.

=== Return to Víkingur Ólafsvík ===
In April 2019, Reyes returned to his boyhood club Víkingur. Reyes scored his first professional goal in a 2–4 away win against Leiknir.

=== Fjölnir ===
Reyes joined Fjölnir in February 2021. He scored his first goal for the club in a 1–4 away win against Augnablik in the 2021 Icelandic Men's Football Cup - Third Round.

=== Kórdrengir ===
In March 2022, after a successful trial, Reyes joined second division club Kórdrengir. He scored his first goal on his debut for the club in a 3–0 win against Vestri in the 2022 Icelandic Men's Football League Cup.

=== Ægir ===
A season later, Reyes joined Ægir on a free transfer.

=== Krabi FC ===
Reyes joined Krabi F.C. in Thai League 2 in January 2024 and made his debut on 6 January against Rayong F.C. He scored his first goal for the club in a 1–1 away draw with Pattaya United F.C. on 20 January.

== International career ==
Reyes was born and raised in Ólafsvík, Iceland to a Filipino father and an Icelandic mother, making him eligible to represent either Philippines or Iceland at international level.

=== Philippines ===
In October 2018, Reyes was invited to train with the Philippines in preparation for the 2018 AFF Suzuki Cup and 2019 AFC Asian Cup. He revealed that he was contacted in 2017 by former Philippines international Ray Anthony Jónsson, who is also half Icelandic, about his interest to play for the Philippines.

In May 2024, Reyes was included in the Philippines 28-man squad for the 2026 FIFA World Cup qualifying matches against Vietnam and Indonesia.
