= Júnior Batista =

Brazilian footballer

Personal information
- Full name: Elisio Batista da Conceição Júnior
- Date of birth: 11 April 1993 (age 33)
- Place of birth: Salvador, Bahia, Brazil
- Height: 1.92 m (6 ft 4 in)
- Position: Forward

Team information
- Current team: Semen Padang
- Number: 93

Youth career
- Elosport

Senior career*
Years	Team	Apps	(Gls)
–2017	Atlântico	20	(5)
2017	Ceilândia	1	(0)
2017–2018	GDSC Alvarenga	11	(4)
2018	Richmond	4	(1)
2018	Għarb Rangers		
2019–2020	Moura	16	(15)
2020	Ferroviário	13	(1)
2021	Cape Town Spurs	15	(0)
2021	Real Estelí		
2022	Gangneung Citizen	24	(6)
2023	Democrata	2	(0)
2023	Kanchanaburi Power	15	(8)
2024	Nongbua Pitchaya	12	(5)
2024–2025	Lamphun Warriors	25	(2)
2025–2026	Rayong	14	(1)
2026	Hoang Anh Gia Lai	13	(2)
2026–	Semen Padang	1	(0)
- * Club domestic league appearances and goals as of 13 September 2026

Elisio Batista da Conceição Júnior (born 11 April 1993), commonly known as Júnior Batista, is a Brazilian professional footballer who plays as a forward for Championship club Semen Padang.

== Career ==
Batista started his career with Brazilian sixth division side Atlântico, helping them earn promotion to the Brazilian fifth division,

In 2017, he signed for Ceilândia in the Brazilian fourth division. After that, Batista signed for Portuguese fourth division club GDSC Alvarenga.

In 2018, he signed for Richmond in the Australian fourth division. After that, Batista signed for Gozitan team Għarb Rangers.

In 2020, Batista signed for Ferroviário (CE) in the Brazilian third division after playing for Portuguese fourth division outfit Moura, where he made 13 league appearances and scored 1 goal.

Before the second half of 2020–21, he signed for Cape Town Spurs in the South African second division.

== Honours ==
Nongbua Pitchaya

- Thai League 2 runner-up: 2023–24
