= Kanchanaburi Power F.C. =

Thai football club, based in Mueang

Kanchanaburi Power พลังกาญจน์ เอฟซี
- Full name: Kanchanaburi Power Football Club (สโมสรฟุตบอลพลังกาญจน์)
- Nicknames: The Iron Horse (ม้าเหล็ก)
- Short name: KCP
- Founded: 2017; 9 years ago as Singha Golden Bells Kanchanaburi; 2022; 4 years ago as Dragon Pathumwan Kanchanaburi; 2024; 2 years ago as Kanchanaburi Power
- Ground: Kanchanaburi Province Stadium; Kanchanaburi, Thailand
- Capacity: 13,000
- Chairman: Panuwat Thasnanipan
- Head coach: Park Hang-seo
- League: Thai League 2
- 2025–26: Thai League 1, 16th place (Relegated)
- Website: kanchanaburipowerfc.com
Home colours	Away colours

Kanchanaburi Power Football Club (Thai: สโมสรฟุตบอลพลังกาญจน์) is a Thai professional football club based in Mueang, Kanchanaburi province. The club currently play in the Thai League 2.

== History ==
=== Formation and early years ===
In 2017, the club was established as Singha Golden Bells Muangkan. In 2018, Singha Golden Bells Muangkan competed in the fourth tier Thailand Amateur League Western region. In 2020, the club was promoted to Thai League 3 and renamed to Singha Golden Bells Kanchanaburi. The club finished in 4th place of the Western region. In 2022, the club was renamed to Dragon Pathumwan Kanchanaburi and changed their club logo for the second time featuring a dragon. In 2021, The club than participated in the Thai FA Cup for the first time but was knocked out in the second round to Thai League 1 side Port losing to them 4–2.

The club than participated in the 2022–23 season where they played their opening league match with a 3–3 away draw against Chainat United and ended the season with a 1–0 home win over Chainat United. The club has finished 1st and advanced to the championship stage thus gaining promotion to the 2023–24 Thai League 2 season.

=== Historic FA Cup final appearance ===
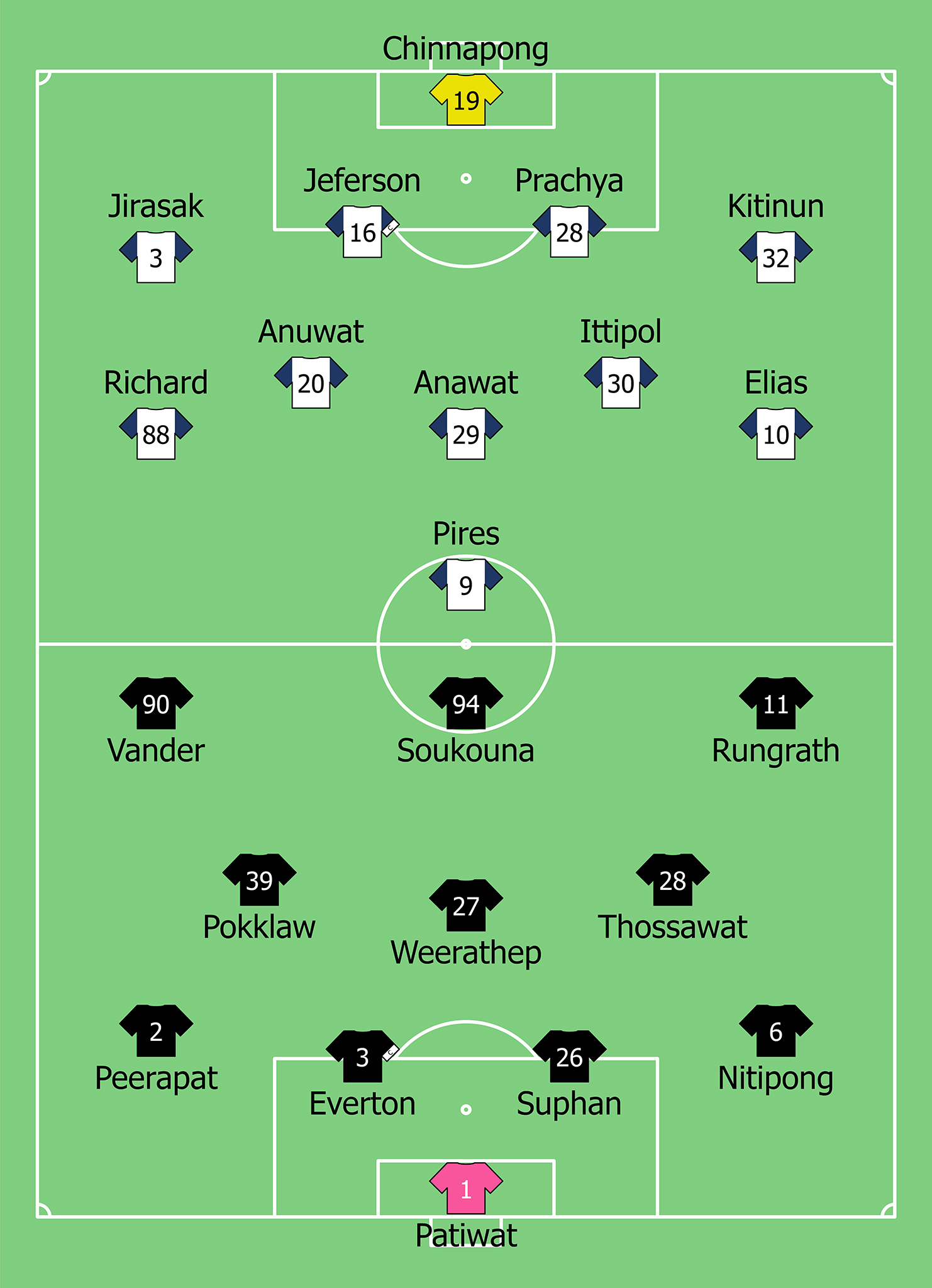
Lineups of the 2024 Thai FA Cup final between Bangkok United and Kanchanaburi Power

In the 2023–24 Thai FA Cup, they became the first club in Thailand football history to play from the first round and ended up in the final in which the club narrowly lost the final on penalties shootout after a 1–1 fighting draw against Bangkok United on 15 June 2024. On 4 October 2023, the club won against Namphong United 13–0, the highest recorded win in the cup history. The club then qualified to the second round where they would face Chattrakan City. On 1 November, as the scoreline was levelled at 2–2, Júnior Batista scored in the 105th minute to send Kanchanaburi through to the next round. On 20 December, the club faced Udon Thani City and won 2–0. The club next faced Phitsanulok Unity on 28 February 2024. Pichitchai Sienkrthok scored in 120th minute to send Dragon Pathumwan Kanchanaburi to the quarter-finals. On 10 April, the club was drawn against Sukhothai, beating them 2–0 to progressing to the semi-final. Dragon Pathumwan Kanchanaburi then faced Samut Sakhon City, winning 3–1 and going to the 2024 Thai FA Cup final for the first time in the club history. On 15 June, the club faced off against Bangkok United where Ricardo Pires oscored, before opposition Vander leveled the score. Dragon Pathumwan Kanchanaburi lost 4–2 on penalties.

=== Revamp and promotion to the first division ===
In June 2024, the club was revamped and renamed to Kanchanaburi Power, while adopting a horse logo and nicknaming themselves ''The Iron Horse''. On 24 May 2025, Kanchanaburi Power secure promotion to Thai League 1 for the first time in their history. In match against Phrae United they won on aggregate by 4–5. To prepare for the 2025–26 Thai League 1 season, Kanchanaburi Power bought Mehdi Tahrat from Ligue 2 club Troyes, former Crystal Palace and Everton player Andros Townsend, former Fulham player Aboubakar Kamara and Luxembourg national team all-time top scorer Gerson Rodrigues. The club also signed Ewerton, Mohamed Mara, Alain Oyarzun, and Ezequiel Agüero.

=== Relegation and redevelopment ===
In the 2025–26 Thai League 1 season, following the club's historic first campaign in the top tier of Thai football, the team struggled toward the end of the season. In an attempt to avoid relegation, the management appointed South Korean manager Lee Jung-soo, a former assistant coach for the Vietnam national team. However, the team ultimately finished at the bottom of the table and was relegated to Thai League 2.

Following their relegation, the club's management acknowledged several administrative shortcomings, admitting that the infrastructure was inadequate regarding its tactical systems, squad discipline, and player fitness. In search of a head coach to address these systemic issues, the club subsequently appointed South Korean manager Park Hang-seo. The club also appointed Lee Jung-soo, Pannarai Pansiri and Panupong Wongsa as assistant coaches. Both Park and the management agreed on a rebuilding strategy centered around transforming the "club's DNA." This overhaul focused on elevating training intensity to meet standard physical fitness levels, alongside instilling strict discipline both on and off the pitch. Furthermore, the strategy encompassed the scouting network, long-term structural development, and the implementation of a fully structured youth academy system.

== Team image ==
=== Supporters ===
The club enjoys support from local residents and football fans across Kanchanaburi Province. Matchdays often attract families, students and youth groups, reflecting the club’s community-based culture. Supporters play an active role in creating a lively atmosphere at home matches, with banners, chants and local pride contributing to the team’s identity.

=== Rivalries ===
Due to its location in western Thailand, Kanchanaburi's main rivalries are primarily regional, developing through frequent meetings with neighbouring provincial clubs in Thai League 3 and other lower-division competitions. Matches against nearby sides often attract larger crowds and carry added importance as contests for local pride and regional supremacy.

Fixtures against Suphanburi and Ratchaburi based clubs are commonly regarded as the club’s closest derby encounters, owing to the short travelling distances between provinces and historical competition within the same regional groups. These matches are typically more intense and competitive, with strong supporter presence from both sides.

== Stadium ==
The club plays its home matches at the Kanchanaburi Province Stadium and has focused on creating opportunities for local players while striving for promotion within the national league pyramid. Over the years, the club has worked to establish a competitive squad and a strong regional identity, becoming one of the notable representatives of football in the province.

Coordinates	Location	Stadium	Capacity	Year
14°01′13″N 99°31′17″E	Ban Nuea, Mueang, Kanchanaburi	Kanchanaburi Province Stadium	13,000	2018–present

== Affiliated clubs ==
- (South Korea) FC Seoul (2026–present)

Kanchanaburi Power signed a collaboration agreement with FC Seoul of the K League 1 in May 2026. The partnership focuses on cooperation at the youth level, encompassing the exchange of knowledge, experience, and personnel to elevate local coaching standards and youth player development, particularly in technical skills and sports science. This systematic development aims to provide local youth players with opportunities to progress into qualified professional footballers for Kanchanaburi Power's first team, with potential career pathways to the national team and international leagues.

== Players ==
=== Current squad ===
As of 30 September 2026

Note: Flags indicate national team as defined under FIFA eligibility rules; some limited exceptions apply. Players may hold more than one non-FIFA nationality.

No.	Pos.	Nation	Player
3	DF	THA	Apisit Sorada
4	DF	THA	Phattharaphon Kangsopa
5	DF	THA	Wattana Klomjit
7	FW	BRA	Jô
10	FW	MAD	John Baggio
11	FW	THA	Nantawat Suankaew
14	MF	THA	Piyanut Thodsanit
17	DF	THA	Keron Ornchaiyaphum
18	MF	THA	Pongpat Liorungrueangkit
19	MF	THA	Pardsakorn Sripudpong
20	MF	THA	Phakapon Boonchuay
21	FW	THA	Pattara Soimalai
22	GK	THA	Nalubate Boonyarat
25	DF	THA	Apisit Samurmuen

No.	Pos.	Nation	Player
27	DF	THA	Tony Laurent-Gonnet
28	MF	THA	Prachya Fudsuparp
31	GK	THA	Sumethee Khokpho
34	DF	THA	Boonyarin Soonkarng
35	GK	THA	Sarut Nasri
39	FW	THA	Nethithorn Kaewcharoen
42	MF	THA	Santipap Ratniyorm
47	DF	THA	Nattawut Wongsawang (on loan from BG Pathum United)
52	FW	THA	Kittiphod Sathiphanuwat
70	FW	BRA	Róbson Duarte
88	MF	THA	Chayapipat Supunpasuch
89	DF	THA	Kridsada Limseeput
91	MF	THA	Apichart Denman
94	DF	BRA	Patrick Marcelino

=== Out on loan ===
Note: Flags indicate national team as defined under FIFA eligibility rules; some limited exceptions apply. Players may hold more than one non-FIFA nationality.

No.	Pos.	Nation	Player

== Management and staff ==
Position	Name
President	(Thailand) Panuwat Thasnanipan
Head coach	(South Korea) Park Hang-seo
Assistant coach	(South Korea) Lee Jung-soo (Thailand) Panupong Wongsa
Goalkeeper coach	(Thailand) Naratip Phanprom
Physical & Fitness coach	(South Korea) Roh Yeong Su
Team analyst	(Thailand) Pannarai Pansiri

== Former players ==
=== International capped players ===
AFC/OFC.: (Malaysia) Ezequiel Aguero; (Myanmar) Than Paing; (Philippines) Diego Bardanca; (Philippines) John Lucero; (Singapore) Ryhan Stewart; (Singapore) Anumanthan Kumar	CAF.: (Algeria) Mehdi Tahrat; (Mauritania) Aboubakar Kamara; (Guinea) Mohamed Mara	UEFA.: (England) Andros Townsend; (Luxembourg) Gerson Rodrigues

== Head coaches ==
- (Thailand) Pannarai Pansiri 2020 – 2022
- (Thailand) Kritnarong Haolert 2021
- (Thailand) Pannarai Pansiri 2022
- (Thailand) Yai Nilwong 2022 – 2023
- (Brazil) Douglas Rodrigues 2023 – 2024
- (Thailand) Somchai Makmool 2024
- (Thailand) Dusit Chalermsan 2024 – 2025
- (Spain) Joaquín Gómez 2025
- (Thailand) Wasapol Kaewpaluk 2025 – 2026
- (South Korea) Lee Jung-soo 2026
- (South Korea) Park Hang-seo 2026 –

== Season by season record ==
Season	League									FA Cup	League Cup	Top goalscorer	
Season	Division	P	W	D	L	F	A	Pts	Pos	FA Cup	League Cup	Name	Goals
2018	TA West	5	3	1	1	12	5	10	2nd	Opted out	Ineligible	—N/a	—N/a
2019	TA West	3	2	1	0	13	4	7	2nd	Opted out	Ineligible	—N/a	—N/a
2020–21	T3 West	17	6	6	5	19	22	24	4th	Opted out	Opted out	(Thailand) Nattapong Kumnaet	5
2021–22	T3 West	20	9	4	7	28	29	31	4th	R2	QRP	(Brazil) Lucas Massaro Garcia Gama	7
2022–23	T3 West	22	17	1	4	69	26	52	1st	R1	R2	(Russia) Sergei Tumasyan	14
2023–24	T2	34	10	8	16	43	52	38	13th	RU	QRP	(Brazil) Ricardo Pires	9
2024–25	T2	32	13	13	6	53	36	52	4th	R1	QRP	(Thailand) Kritsana Kasemkulvilai	9
2025–26	T1	30	4	11	15	29	54	23	16th	R3	R1	(Mauritania) Aboubakar Kamara	7

Champions	Runners-up	Promoted	Relegated

- P = Played
- W = Games won
- D = Games drawn
- L = Games lost
- F = Goals for
- A = Goals against
- Pts = Points
- Pos = Final position
- QR1 = First Qualifying Round
- QR2 = Second Qualifying Round
- R1 = Round 1
- R2 = Round 2
- R3 = Round 3
- R4 = Round 4
- R5 = Round 5
- R6 = Round 6
- QF = Quarter-finals
- SF = Semi-finals
- RU = Runners-up
- W = Winners

== Honours ==
=== League ===
- Thai League 2
  - Promotion play-off winner: 2024–25
- Thai League 3 Western Region
  - Winners (1): 2022–23

=== Cup ===
- FA Cup
  - Runners-up (1): 2023–24
