= Phattharaphon Kangsopa =

Thai footballer (born 1996)

Personal information
- Full name: Phattharaphon Kangsopa
- Date of birth: 25 April 1996 (age 30)
- Place of birth: Suphan Buri, Thailand
- Height: 1.81 m (5 ft 11 in)
- Position: Defender

Team information
- Current team: Trat
- Number: 5

Youth career
- 2013–2016: Suphanburi

Senior career*
Years	Team	Apps	(Gls)
2017	Suphanburi	3	(0)
2019	→ Air Force United (loan)	19	(1)
2020–2021	→ Lampang (loan)	15	(1)
2021–2022	Khon Kaen	33	(1)
2022–2023	Uthai Thani	20	(1)
2023–2024	Customs United	34	(2)
2024–2025	Chanthaburi	23	(1)
2025–	Trat	0	(0)
- * Club domestic league appearances and goals as of 1 August 2025

Phattharaphon Kangsopa (Thai: ภัทรภณ กางโสภา, born May 25, 1996) is a Thai professional footballer who plays as a defender for Thai League 2 club Trat.
