= Ayutthaya Province Stadium =

Multi-purpose stadium in Ayutthaya, Thailand

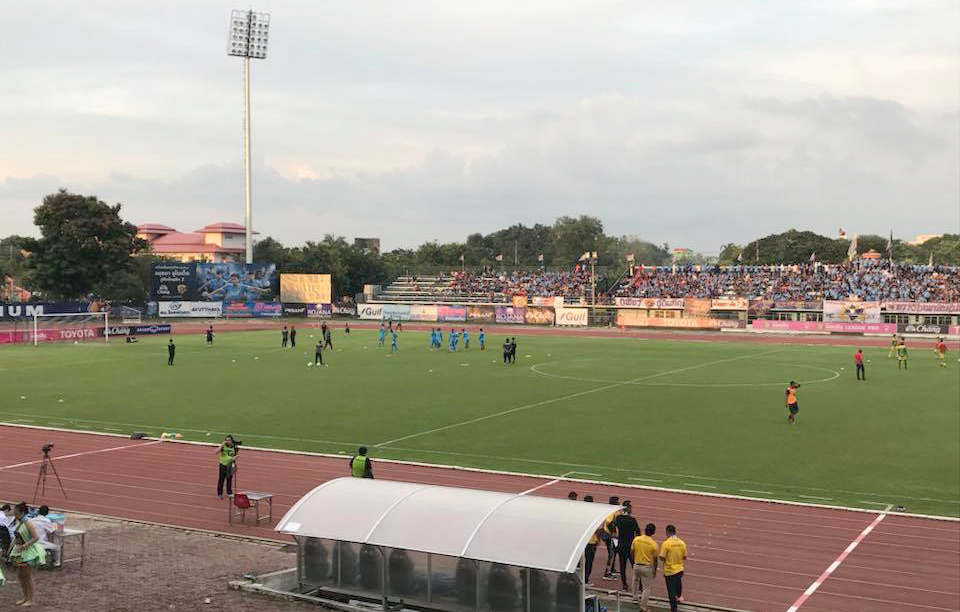
- Interactive map of Ayutthaya Province Stadium
- Location: Ayutthaya, Thailand
- Coordinates: 14°21′00″N 100°35′50″E
- Owner: Phra Nakhon Si Ayuttaya Provincial Administration Organization
- Operator: Phra Nakhon Si Ayuttaya Provincial Administration Organization
- Capacity: 6,000
- Surface: Grass

Tenant
- Ayutthaya United F.C.

Ayutthaya Province Stadium (Thai: สนามกีฬาจังหวัดพระนครศรีอยุธยา) is a multi-purpose stadium in Phra Nakhon Si Ayutthaya Province, Thailand. It is currently used mostly for football matches and is the home stadium of Ayutthaya United. The stadium holds 6,000 people.
