= 2021–22 Muangkan United F.C. season =

Muangkan United
2021–22 season
- Chairman: Issaret Ratsameeruekset
- Manager: Jadet Meelarp (until 29 September 2021); Somchai Makmool (from 19 October 2021)
- Stadium: Kanchanaburi Province Stadium, Mueang Kanchanaburi, Kanchanaburi, Thailand
- Thai League T2: -
- Thai FA Cup: First Round
- Thai League Cup: Qualification play-off round
- Top goalscorer: League: Caion (12); All: Caion (14)

The 2021–22 season is Muangkan United's 1st season in Thai League 2 after promoted from Thai League 3 for the first time in the club's history in 2021. In this season, Muangkan United participates in 3 competitions which consisted of the Thai League 2, FA Cup, and League Cup.

The season was supposed to start on 31 July 2021 and concluded on 30 April 2022. However, due to the current situation of the COVID-19 pandemic in Thailand is still severe, FA Thailand decided to postpone the season to start on 14 August 2021 instead. However, as it stands on 23 July 2021, the COVID-19's situation is getting even worse. Therefore, FA Thailand decided to postpone the opening day for the second time to start on 3 September 2021.

== Squad ==
As of 2 January 2022

Squad No.	Name	Nationality
Goalkeepers
1	Chinnapong Raksri	(Thailand)
18	Anipong Kijkam	(Thailand)
21	Prin Goonchorn	(Thailand)
39	Suracha Nokthong-authai	(Thailand)
Defenders
2	Samerpak Srinon	(Thailand)
3	Rachanon Kanyathong	(Thailand)
5	Tanachat Photcha	(Thailand)
6	Anuwat Matarat	(Thailand)
11	Nattapong Kumnate	(Thailand)
25	Jakkrit Khemnak	(Thailand)
26	Marlon Silva	(Brazil)
29	Worachet Tarasap	(Thailand)
34	Suwat Yadee	(Thailand)
54	Natakorn Soithong	(Thailand)
Midfielders
4	Wattana Klomjit	(Thailand)
7	Kento Nagasaki	(Japan)
8	Suchao Nuchnum (Captain)	(Thailand)
14	Thanawat Ueathanaphaisarn	(Thailand)
17	Panuphong Rungsuree	(Thailand)
19	Jirattikan Vapilai	(Thailand)
30	Pongpat Liorungrueangkit	(Thailand)
31	Anusorn Phrmprasit	(Thailand)
94	Norraseth Lukthong	(Thailand)
Forwards
9	Guntapon Keereeleang	(Thailand)
10	Leandro Assumpção	(Brazil)
13	Supot Jodjam	(Thailand)
20	Jonatan Reis	(Brazil)
22	Jirasak Kumthaisong	(Thailand)
23	Rattasak Wiang-in	(Thailand)
Players loaned out / left during season
24	Martin Steuble	(Philippines) (Switzerland)
16	Koravit Namwiset	(Thailand)
7	Caion	(Brazil)
9	Tatchanon Nakarawong	(Thailand)
17	Patiphan Pinsermsootsri	(Thailand)
36	Sinthaweechai Hathairattanakool	(Thailand)
6	Artyom Filiposyan	(Uzbekistan)
22	Nattayot Pol-yiam	(Thailand)
11	Chitpanya Tisud	(Thailand)
33	Heman Kittiamphaipruek	(Thailand)
4	Nattakrit Thongnoppakun	(Thailand)
38	Amorntep Nilnoy	(Thailand)
15	Phuritad Jarikanon	(Thailand)

== Transfer ==
=== Pre-season transfer ===
==== In ====
Position	Player	Transferred from	Ref
FW	(Brazil) Caion	(Thailand) Suphanburi F.C.	Undisclosed
FW	(Brazil) Leandro Assumpção	(Thailand) Suphanburi F.C.	Undisclosed
DF	(Uzbekistan) Artyom Filiposyan	(Thailand) PT Prachuap F.C.	Undisclosed
MF	(Thailand) Phuritad Jarikanon	(Thailand) PT Prachuap F.C.	Undisclosed
GK	(Thailand) Sinthaweechai Hathairattanakool	(Thailand) Chonburi F.C.	Undisclosed
MF	(Thailand) Tatchanon Nakarawong	(Thailand) Nakhon Ratchasima F.C.	Undisclosed
DF	(Philippines) Martin Steuble	(Thailand) Port F.C.	Undisclosed
MF	(Thailand) Chitpanya Tisud	(Thailand) Ratchaburi Mitr Phol F.C.	Undisclosed
GK	(Thailand) Prin Goonchorn	(Thailand) Sisaket F.C.	Undisclosed
DF	(Thailand) Rachanon Kanyathong	(Thailand) Udon United F.C.	Undisclosed
MF	(Thailand) Jirattikan Vapilai	(Thailand) Sisaket United F.C.	Undisclosed

==== Loan In ====
Position	Player	Transferred from	Ref
DF	(Thailand) Nattayot Pol-yiam	(Thailand) Chonburi F.C.	Season loan
GK	(Thailand) Anipong Kijkam	(Thailand) Police Tero F.C.	Season loan
DF	(Thailand) Suwat Yadee	(Thailand) Kanchanaburi F.C.	Season loan

==== Out ====
Position	Player	Transferred To	Ref
DF	(Thailand) Patipan Un-Op	(Thailand) Sukhothai F.C.	Undisclosed
DF	(France) Zady Moise Gnenegbe	(Thailand) Ubon Kruanapat F.C.	Undisclosed
FW	(Brazil) Stéfano Yuri	Unattached (Note: Later joined Pattani)	End of contract
MF	(Thailand) Thaweekun Thong-on	(Thailand) Ubon Kruanapat F.C.	Undisclosed
GK	(Thailand) Santipab Boonkriang	(Thailand) Songkhla F.C.	Undisclosed
MF	(Thailand) Pollawut Kwasena	Unattached	End of contract
FW	(Thailand) Yuttana Ruangsuksut	Unattached (Note: Later joined Pattaya Dolphins United)	End of contract
FW	(Thailand) Prasert Pattawin	Unattached	End of contract
FW	(Thailand) Santirad Weing-in	Unattached (Note: Later joined Ubon Kruanapat)	End of contract
FW	(Ivory Coast) Bireme Diouf	Unattached	End of contract
GK	(Thailand) Kantaphat Manpati	Unattached (Note: Later joined Kasetsart)	End of contract
DF	(Thailand) Nattapol Boonpluem	Unattached	End of contract
FW	(Thailand) Panudech Suabpeng	Unattached	End of contract
DF	(Thailand) Jiranchai Arnanatiudom	Unattached	End of contract
FW	(Thailand) Naphat Thamrongsupakorn	(Thailand) Phitsanulok F.C.	Undisclosed
FW	(Thailand) Chakrit Rawanprakone	Unattached (Note: Later joined Khon Kaen)	End of contract
DF	(Thailand) Chindanai Wongphasert	(Thailand) Kanchanaburi F.C.	Undisclosed
DF	(Thailand) Dantrai Longjamnong	Unattached	Retired

==== Loan Out ====
Position	Player	Transferred To	Ref

=== Mid-season transfer ===
==== In ====
Position	Player	Transferred from	Ref
MF	(Japan) Kento Nagasaki	(Thailand) Kanchanaburi F.C.	Undisclosed
DF	(Thailand) Jakkrit Khemnak	(Thailand) Muang Loei United F.C.	Undisclosed
FW	(Thailand) Jirasak Kumthaisong	(Thailand) Kanchanaburi F.C.	Undisclosed
MF	(Thailand) Thanawat Ueathanaphaosarn	(Thailand) Kanchanaburi F.C.	Undisclosed
MF	(Thailand) Wattana Klomjit	(Thailand) Kanchanaburi F.C.	Undisclosed
DF	(Thailand) Nattapong Kumnate	(Thailand) Kanchanaburi F.C.	Undisclosed
DF	(Thailand) Anuwat Matarat	(Thailand) Kanchanaburi F.C.	Undisclosed
GK	(Thailand) Jirayut Kaewthong	(Thailand) Kanchanaburi F.C.	Undisclosed
GK	(Thailand) Chinnapong Raksri	(Thailand) Kanchanaburi F.C.	Undisclosed
DF	(Thailand) Natakorn Soithong	(Thailand) Kanchanaburi F.C.	Undisclosed
DF	(Brazil) Marlon Silva	(Thailand) Lampang F.C.	Free
MF	(Thailand) Pongpat Liorungrueangkit	(Thailand) Sukhothai F.C.	Undisclosed
FW	(Thailand) Supot Jodjam	(Thailand) Kasetsart F.C.	Undisclosed
MF	(Thailand) Panuphong Rungsuree	(Thailand) Trang F.C.	Undisclosed
MF	(Thailand) Norraseth Lukthong	(Thailand) Udon Thani F.C.	Undisclosed
DF	(Thailand) Samerpak Srinon	(Thailand) Lampang F.C.	Undisclosed

==== Loan In ====
Position	Player	Transferred from	Ref
FW	(Thailand) Guntapon Keereeleang	(Thailand) Bangkok United F.C.	Season loan

==== Out ====
Position	Player	Transferred To	Ref
DF	(Philippines) Martin Steuble	Unattached (Note: Later joined Port)	Contract terminated
DF	(Thailand) Koravit Namwiset	Unattached (Note: Later joined Police Tero)	Mutual Consent
FW	(Brazil) Caion	Unattached (Note: Later joined Selangor)	Mutual Consent
MF	(Thailand) Tatchanon Nakarawong	Unattached (Note: Later joined Trat)	Mutual Consent
FW	(Thailand) Patiphan Pinsermsootsri	Unattached (Note: Later joined Pattaya Dolphins United)	Mutual Consent
GK	(Thailand) Sinthaweechai Hathairattanakool	Unattached (Note: Later joined Police Tero)	Mutual Consent
DF	(Uzbekistan) Artyom Filiposyan	Unattached	Mutual Consent
MF	(Thailand) Chitpanya Tisud	(Thailand) Uthai Thani F.C.	Free
DF	(Thailand) Heman Kittiamphaipruek	(Thailand) Banbueng F.C.	Undisclosed
DF	(Thailand) Nattakrit Thongnoppakun	Unattached	Mutual Consent
MF	(Thailand) Amorntep Nilnoy	Unattached (Note: Later joined Trat)	Mutual Consent
MF	(Thailand) Phuritad Jarikanon	Unattached	Mutual Consent

==== Loan Out ====
Position	Player	Transferred To	Ref

== Competitions ==
=== Overview ===
Competition	First match	Last match	Starting round	Final position	Record							
Competition	First match	Last match	Starting round	Final position	Pld	W	D	L	GF	GA	GD	Win %
Thai League 2	4 September 2021	30 April 2022	Matchday 1		19	7	6	6	37	34	+3	36.84
FA Cup	29 September 2021	27 October 2021	Qualification Round	First Round	2	1	0	1	4	5	−1	50.00
League Cup	3 November 2021	3 November 2021	Qualification play-off round	Qualification play-off round	1	0	1	0	0	0	+0	0.00
Total					22	8	7	7	41	39	+2	36.36

Last updated: 15 January 2022
Source: Competitions

=== Thai League 2 ===
==== League table ====
Pos	Team	Pld	W	D	L	GF	GA	GD	Pts	Qualification or relegation
5	Chainat Hornbill	34	15	12	7	58	46	+12	57 (Note: The head-to-head record was a tie, Lampang ahead on overall goals difference.)	Qualification for promotion play-offs
6	Phrae United	34	14	12	8	51	35	+16	54	Qualification for promotion play-offs
7	Muangkan United (R)	34	14	10	10	70	62	+8	52	Relegation to 2023 Thailand Amateur League (Note: Muangkan United administratively relegated to 2023 Thailand Amateur League by FA Thailand decision because of the failure about club licensing.)
8	Udon Thani	34	13	8	13	53	58	−5	47	
9	Rayong	34	13	7	14	45	41	+4	46	

Source: Thai League
Rules for classification: 1) Points; 2) Head-to-head points; 3) Head-to-head goal difference; 4) Head-to-head goal scored; 5) Overall goal difference; 6) Overall goal scored; 7) Fair play points; 8) Play-off without extra time).
(R) Relegated

==== Results summary ====
Overall								Home						Away					
Pld	W	D	L	GF	GA	GD	Pts	W	D	L	GF	GA	GD	W	D	L	GF	GA	GD
19	7	6	6	37	34	+3	27	3	3	3	16	15	+1	4	3	3	21	19	+2

==== Results by matchday ====
Matchday	1	2	3	4	5	6	7	8	9	10	11	12	13	14	15	16	17	18	19	20
Ground	A	A	H	A	H	A	H	A	H	H	A	A	H	A	H	H	A	H	A	H
Result	D	L	W	L	L	L	L	D	D	D	W	D	L	W	D	W	W	W	W	
Position	10	12	9	13	13	16	16	17	17	17	14	14	16	14	14	11	10	8		

A = Away; H = Home; W = Win; D = Draw; L = Loss

==== Matches ====
Win Draw Loss

4 September 2021 1	Lampang	1-1	Muangkan United	Lampang
	Weerayut 68'		Caion 1'	Stadium: Lampang Province Stadium; Attendance: 0 Referee: Komgrit Ponpasit

12 September 2021 2	Rayong	3-2	Muangkan United	Chonburi
	Adisak 19'; David Cuerva 31'; Attapong 80'		Caion 24' 90+3'	Stadium: Chonburi Stadium; Attendance: 0 Referee: Putthipong Issising

15 September 2021 3	Muangkan United	2-1	Ayutthaya United	Kanchanaburi
	Assumpção 44'; Patiphan 90+5'		Anuwat 70'	Stadium: Kanchanaburi Province Stadium; Attendance: 0 Referee: U-Sen Yala

18 September 2021 4	Udon Thani	3-1	Muangkan United	Udon Thani
	Kapisoda 7'; Arnold 73'; Kittiphong 90+2'		Caion 90+5'	Stadium: SAT Stadium Udon Thani; Attendance: 970; Referee: Vitsawa Nanchana

26 September 2021 5	Muangkan United	1-2	Kasetsart	Kanchanaburi
	Anusorn 45+1'		Raphael 22'; Komazec 32'	Stadium: Kanchanaburi Province Stadium; Attendance: 0 Referee: Veeraporn Maophaeo

3 October 2021 6	Customs Ladkrabang United	5-2	Muangkan United	Samut Prakan
	Choe 7' 78'; Nattawut 57'; Skraparas 68' (pen.); Elias 79'		Patiphan 28'; Caion 55' (pen.)	Stadium: Lad Krabang 54 Stadium; Attendance: 116; Referee: Kriangsak Keattisongkram

10 October 2021 7	Muangkan United	0-1	Lamphun Warriors	Kanchanaburi
			Anan 57'	Stadium: Kanchanaburi Province Stadium; Attendance: 990; Referee: Pawara Seejen

13 October 2021 8	Sukhothai	2-2	Muangkan United	Sukhothai
	Sow 72' 84'		Caion 4' 41'	Stadium: Thalay Luang Stadium; Attendance: 489; Referee: Natthwut Nammuang

16 October 2021 9	Muangkan United	3-3	Khon Kaen	Kanchanaburi
	Assumpção 34'; Caion 39' 43' (pen.)		Chakrit 51'; Winai 57'; Phattharaphon 89'	Stadium: Kanchanaburi Province Stadium; Attendance: 909; Referee: Chaikrit Inboonsong

23 October 2021 10	Muangkan United	2-2	Grand Andaman Ranong United	Kanchanaburi
	Suchao 16'; Caion 57' (pen.)		Chamsuddeen 65'; Frank 75'	Stadium: Kanchanaburi Province Stadium; Attendance: 675; Referee: U-sen Yala

6 November 2021 11	Chainat Hornbill	0-2	Muangkan United	Chai Nat
			Cyrus 56' (o.g.); Assumpção 88'	Stadium: Khao Plong Stadium; Attendance: 1,120; Referee: Chaiya Moolmanee

14 November 2021 12	Phrae United	2-2	Muangkan United	Phrae
	Maranhão 75' (pen.); Kittisak 90'		Chitpanya 84'; Assumpção 86'	Stadium: Huai Ma Stadium; Attendance: 532; Referee: Ekkachai Phetcham

17 November 2021 13	Muangkan United	1-2	Nakhon Pathom United	Kanchanaburi
	Tanachat 51'		Krissana 45+2'; Neto Santos 90+1'	Stadium: Kanchanaburi Province Stadium; Attendance: 1,190; Referee: Tawatchai Ngampod

20 November 2021 14	Rajpracha	1-4	Muangkan United	Pathum Thani
	Jardel 70'		Caion 23'; Assumpção 45+1' 86'; Reis 78' (pen.)	Stadium: Leo Stadium; Attendance: 0 Referee: Wathanyu Morin

27 November 2021 15	Muangkan United	2-2	Trat	Kanchanaburi
	Reis 40'; Caion 54'		Pornpreecha 19'; Conrado 90+6'	Stadium: Kanchanaburi Province Stadium; Attendance: 1,091; Referee: Ruttapol Kongboonwas

1 December 2021 16	Muangkan United	2-1	Chiangmai	Kanchanaburi
	Reis 56'; Suchao 82'		Meedech 67'	Stadium: Kanchanaburi Province Stadium; Attendance: 1,006; Referee: Thapakorn Thongkon

4 December 2021 17	Navy	1-2	Muangkan United	Chonburi
	Bamba 12'		Assumpção 45+2'; Reis 84'	Stadium: Sattahip Navy Stadium

9 January 2022 18	Muangkan United	3-1	Rayong	Ratchaburi
	Kento 39'; Reis 71'; Assumpção 90+3'		Ramon 57'	Stadium: Mitr Phol Stadium (Note: Due to 2022 Thailand National Games, their Kanchanaburi Province Stadium is used for the competition. Therefore, Muangkan United will temporarily use Mitr Phol Stadium instead during the second half of the season); Attendance: 258; Referee: Satchukorn Saenchu

15 January 2022 19	Ayutthaya United	1-3	Muangkan United	Ayutthaya
	Chananon 63'; Soponwit (red card) 66'		Reis 29' (pen.) 90+5'; Assumpção 52'	Stadium: Ayutthaya Province Stadium; Attendance: 420; Referee: Peeratat Kittikanmetee

23 January 2022 20	Muangkan United	v	Udon Thani	Ratchaburi
				Stadium: Mitr Phol Stadium

=== Thai FA Cup ===
29 September 2021 Qualification Round	Phichit United (TA)	2-4	Muangkan United (T2)	Phitsanulok
	Santisak 17'; Amnart 85' (pen.)		Caion 37' 46'; Assumpção 43'; Reis 89' (pen.)	Stadium: H2H Sport Stadium; Attendance: 0 Referee: Wathanyu Morin

27 October 2021 First Round	Muangkan United (T2)	0-3	Nakhon Ratchasima (T1)	Kanchanaburi
	Filiposyan (red card) 37'		Nattachai 26'; Villanueva 35'; Karikari 43'	Stadium: Kanchanaburi Province Stadium; Attendance: 551; Referee: Akom Charoensuk

=== Thai League Cup ===
3 November 2021 Qualification play-off round	Uthai Thani (T3)	0-0 (a.e.t.) (3-1 p)	Muangkan United (T2)	Uthai Thani
				Stadium: Uthai Thani Province Stadium; Attendance: 621; Referee: Wirot Oupachit
	Penalties
	Santos (penalty missed); Phattharaphon (penalty scored); Jakree (penalty scored); Narong (penalty scored)		(penalty missed) Caion; (penalty missed) Koravit; (penalty missed) Rachanon; (penalty scored) Jirattikan

== Team statistics ==
=== Appearances and goals ===
As of 15 January 2022

No.	Pos.	Player	League		FA Cup		League Cup		Total	
No.	Pos.	Player	Apps.	Goals	Apps.	Goals	Apps.	Goals	Apps.	Goals
1	GK	(Thailand) Chinnapong Raksri	0	0	0	0	0	0	0	0
2	DF	(Thailand) Samerpak Srinon	0	0	0	0	0	0	0	0
3	DF	(Thailand) Rachanon Kanyathong	14+2	0	1	0	1	0	16+2	0
4	MF	(Thailand) Wattana Klomjit	0+2	0	0	0	0	0	0+2	0
5	DF	(Thailand) Tanachat Photcha	8+3	1	0	0	0	0	8+3	1
6	DF	(Thailand) Anuwat Matarat	0	0	0	0	0	0	0	0
7	MF	(Japan) Kento Nagasaki	2	1	0	0	0	0	2	1
8	MF	(Thailand) Suchao Nuchnum	14+2	2	0+1	0	1	0	15+3	2
9	FW	(Thailand) Guntapon Keereeleang	0	0	0	0	0	0	0	0
10	FW	(Brazil) Leandro Assumpção	19	9	2	1	0+1	0	21+1	10
11	DF	(Thailand) Nattapong Kumnate	0	0	0	0	0	0	0	0
13	FW	(Thailand) Supot Jodjam	0+2	0	0	0	0	0	0+2	0
14	MF	(Thailand) Thanawat Ueathanaphaosarn	0	0	0	0	0	0	0	0
17	MF	(Thailand) Panuphong Rungsuree	0	0	0	0	0	0	0	0
18	GK	(Thailand) Anipong Kijkam	0	0	0	0	0	0	0	0
19	MF	(Thailand) Jirattikan Vapilai	5+3	0	0+1	0	0+1	0	5+5	0
20	FW	(Brazil) Jonatan Reis	10+7	7	2	1	0	0	12+7	8
21	GK	(Thailand) Prin Goonchorn	10	0	2	0	1	0	13	0
22	FW	(Thailand) Jirasak Kumthaisong	0	0	0	0	0	0	0	0
23	FW	(Thailand) Rattasak Wiang-in	11+4	0	1+1	0	1	0	13+5	0
25	DF	(Thailand) Jakkrit Khemnak	2	0	0	0	0	0	2	0
26	DF	(Brazil) Marlon Silva	2	0	0	0	0	0	2	0
29	DF	(Thailand) Worachet Tarasap	0	0	0	0	0	0	0	0
30	MF	(Thailand) Pongpat Liorungrueangkit	2	0	0	0	0	0	2	0
31	MF	(Thailand) Anusorn Phrmprasit	11+6	1	2	0	0+1	0	13+7	1
34	DF	(Thailand) Suwat Yadee	3+3	0	2	0	0+1	0	5+4	0
39	GK	(Thailand) Suracha Nokthong-authai	0	0	0	0	0	0	0	0
54	DF	(Thailand) Natakorn Soithong	0	0	0	0	0	0	0	0
94	MF	(Thailand) Norraseth Lukthong	2	0	0	0	0	0	2	0
Players loaned out / left during season
24	DF	(Philippines) Martin Steuble	9+3	0	0	0	1	0	10+3	0
16	DF	(Thailand) Koravit Namwiset	14	0	0+2	0	1	0	15+2	0
7	FW	(Brazil) Caion	15+2	12	2	2	1	0	18+2	14
9	MF	(Thailand) Tatchanon Nakarawong	10+3	0	1+1	0	0+1	0	11+5	0
17	FW	(Thailand) Patiphan Pinsermsootsri	9+5	2	1+1	0	1	0	11+6	2
36	GK	(Thailand) Sinthaweechai Hathairattanakool	9	0	0	0	0	0	9	0
6	DF	(Uzbekistan) Artyom Filiposyan	10+4	0	2	0	1	0	13+4	0
22	DF	(Thailand) Nattayot Pol-yiam	3+9	0	1	0	0	0	4+9	0
11	MF	(Thailand) Chitpanya Tisud	9+5	1	1+1	0	1	0	11+6	1
33	DF	(Thailand) Heman Kittiamphaipruek	2+2	0	1	0	0	0	3+2	0
4	DF	(Thailand) Nattakrit Thongnoppakun	1	0	0	0	0	0	1	0
38	MF	(Thailand) Amorntep Nilnoy	2+10	0	0+2	0	1	0	3+12	0
15	MF	(Thailand) Phuritad Jarikanon	0	0	1	0	0	0	1	0

== Overall summary ==
=== Season summary ===
Games played	22 (19 Thai League 2, 2 FA Cup, 1 League Cup)
Games won	8 (7 Thai League 2, 1 FA Cup, 0 League Cup)
Games drawn	7 (6 Thai League 2, 0 FA Cup, 1 League Cup)
Games lost	7 (6 Thai League 2, 1 FA Cup, 0 League Cup)
Goals scored	41 (37 Thai League 2, 4 FA Cup, 0 League Cup)
Goals conceded	39 (34 Thai League 2, 5 FA Cup, 0 League Cup)
Goal difference	+2
Clean sheets	2 (1 Thai League 2, 0 FA Cup, 1 League Cup)
Best result	4-1 vs Rajpracha (20 November 21)
Worst result	0-3 vs Nakhon Ratchasima (27 October 21)
Most appearances	Leandro Assumpção (22)
Top scorer	Caion (14)
Points	27
