= 2020–21 Thai FA Cup =

Chang FA Cup

Tournament details
- Country: Thailand
- Dates: 30 September 2020 – 11 April 2021
- Teams: 91

Final positions
- Champions: Chiangrai United (3rd title)
- Runners-up: Chonburi

Tournament statistics
- Matches played: 90
- Goals scored: 368 (4.09 per match)
- Top goal scorer(s): Bill, Eliandro (8 goals)

Awards
- Best player: Worachit Kanitsribampen

The 2020–21 Thai FA Cup is the 27th season of a Thailand's knockout football competition, this season is the 50th anniversary since its establishment in 1970. The tournament was sponsored by Chang, and known as the Chang FA Cup (Thai: ช้าง เอฟเอคัพ) for sponsorship purposes. The tournament is organized by the Football Association of Thailand. 91 clubs were accepted into the tournament, and it began with the qualification round on 30 September 2020 and concluded with the final on 11 April 2021. The winner would have qualified for the 2022 AFC Champions League group stage and the 2021 Thailand Champions Cup.

== Calendar ==
Round	Date	Matches	Clubs	New entries this round
Qualification round	30 September 2020	27	8 + 25 + 21 → 27	8 2020–21 Thai League 2; 25 2020–21 Thai League 3; 21 Thailand Amateur League
First round	7–8 November 2020	32	27 + 16 + 5 + 7 + 9 → 32	16 2020–21 Thai League 1; 5 2020–21 Thai League 2; 7 2020–21 Thai League 3; 9 Thailand Amateur League
Second round	5–30 December 2020	16	32 → 16	
Third round	3 February 2021	8	16 → 8	
Quarter-finals	3 April 2021	4	8 → 4	
Semi-finals	7 April 2021	2	4 → 2	
Final	11 April 2021	1	2 → Champions	
Total				91 clubs

== Results ==
Note: T1: Clubs from Thai League 1; T2: Clubs from Thai League 2; T3: Clubs from Thai League 3; T4: Clubs from Thailand Amateur League.

=== Qualification round ===
There were 8 clubs from 2020–21 Thai League 2, 25 clubs from 2020–21 Thai League 3 and 21 clubs from Thailand Amateur League have signed to participate in the 2020–21 Thai FA Cup. The draw took place on 24 February 2020.

30 September 2020	Nongbua Pitchaya (T2)	6–0	Nam Phong United (T4)	Mueang, Nongbua Lamphu
15:30 (UTC+7)	Supot Jodjam 36', 52', 90+2'; Yod Chanthawong 57'; Kansit Premthanakoon 78'; Sakdarin Mingsamorn 90+1'	Report		Stadium: Nongbua Lamphu Provincial Stadium; Attendance: 255; Referee: Vitsawa Nanchana; Assistant referees: Pongsira Phuangket, Narinnart Tiamskun; Fourth official: Somkhid Sarapim

30 September 2020	Surin City (T3)	2–2 (4–5 p)	Techno Sawang (T4)	Mueang, Surin
15:30 (UTC+7)	Watthanapon Chinthong 6', 23'	Report	Siriwat Phamhakun 42'; Worawut Jomsri 82'	Stadium: Sri Narong Stadium; Attendance: 200; Referee: Chaiyarat Phooalai; Assistant referees: Surawut Nuanyoi, Prakasit Chantarasawang; Fourth official: Kasemsan Sakulram
	Penalties
	Chayapon Udornpan (penalty missed); Weeraphan Niratpai (penalty scored); Pichet Mutumachan (penalty scored); Atip Sadabsarn (penalty scored); Watthanapon Chinthong (penalty scored)		(penalty scored) Aphichart Saenpho; (penalty scored) Worawut Jomsri; (penalty scored) Sanchai Laksanapia; (penalty scored) Nitisad Chintawun; (penalty scored) Thibet Amphan

30 September 2020	Kalasin Sauropod (T4)	2–0	Chaiyaphum Chang Suek (T4)	Mueang, Kalasin
15:30 (UTC+7)	Tanapol Kampirom 58', 82'	Report		Stadium: Kalasin Provincial Stadium; Attendance: 398; Referee: Khwanchai Chantayung; Assistant referees: Jarin Yawapee, Pisal Motongsri

30 September 2020	Pakchong SCK (T4)	3–0	Bang Khun Thian United (T4)	Muaklek, Saraburi
15:30 (UTC+7)	Jakkit Chaypimay 19', 60'; Thammanoon Losanthia 61'	Report		Stadium: National Sports Training Center Muaklek Stadium; Attendance: 200; Referee: Uthai Purase; Assistant referees: Thanapon Suwannaket

30 September 2020	Ubon Kids City (T4)	2–2 (5–6 p)	Kranuan (T4)	Mueang, Ubon Ratchathani
15:30 (UTC+7)	Tanyapong Saengsawang 16'; Natcha Phonkham 24'	Report	Thanawat Sodalee 18'; Thawisap Phosri 67' (pen.)	Stadium: UMT Stadium; Attendance: 250; Referee: Sittichai Saramai; Assistant referees: Kroekkiad Laosing, Sirichai Raksaphan; Fourth official: Watcharachat Loumpool
	Penalties
	Chaiwat Kotpanya (penalty scored); Rattanapon Boonpanya (penalty missed); Kasermsit Hannarong (penalty missed); Tanyapong Saengsawang (penalty scored); Panupong Intachumphu (penalty scored); Theerawat Sirijan (penalty scored); Worawut Savaengsai (penalty scored); Thitiwut Nisa (penalty missed)		(penalty scored) Jeerapong Faipitch; (penalty scored) Kritsada Bantao; (penalty missed) Thanawat Sodalee; (penalty missed) Jetarin Sinna; (penalty scored) Thammarat Tathip; (penalty scored) Thanachot Phopsamai; (penalty scored) Thawisap Phosri; (penalty scored) Sitthisak Machan

30 September 2020	Krabi (T3)	7–2	Samut Songkhram Junior (T4)	Mueang, Krabi
15:30 (UTC+7)	Teerawut Churok 6'; George Kelbel 33', 57'; Koné Seydou 43'; Arnon Petwat 47', 89'; Fandee Kaeyiwa 85'	Report	Wuttiporn Chaiyo 46'; Kantorn Maikaew 65'	Stadium: Krabi Provincial Stadium; Attendance: 23; Referee: Mahama Arwae; Assistant referees: Phitsanu Chusi, Phongsiri Chusi; Fourth official: Santi Raknoon

30 September 2020	Saimit Kabin United (T3)	0–0 (4–5 p)	Banbueng (T3)	Kabinburi, Prachinburi
15:30 (UTC+7)		Report		Stadium: Nom Klao Maharaj Stadium; Attendance: 54; Referee: Somsuk Poosomnuek; Assistant referees: Pongsakorn Wisitsri, Wararit Suwanjira; Fourth official: Thawatchai Sangsanit
	Penalties
	Mathee Pungpo (penalty missed); Nithi Sirichan (penalty scored); Worachat Impong (penalty scored); Mathawin Chueanun (penalty scored); Mongkol Worapom (penalty scored)		(penalty scored) Autthagowit Jantod; (penalty scored) Tawan Chanthasen; (penalty scored) Jakkapong Sanmahung; (penalty scored) Nethithorn Kaewcharoen; (penalty scored) Warakorn Thongbai

30 September 2020	Muangkan United (T3)	7–0	Aidin Sport Thailand (T4)	Mueang, Kanchanaburi
15:30 (UTC+7)	Chakrit Rawanprakone 21'; Machado de Souza Rosa 43'; Bireme Diouf 49', 53'; Patiphan Pinsermsootsri 56'; Yuttana Ruangsuksut 89'; Naphat Thamrongsupakorn 90+1'	Report		Stadium: Kanchanaburi Provincial Stadium; Attendance: 420; Referee: Yuttana Sadkrathok; Assistant referees: Tanate Jaithai, Chanayut Kaiwijit; Fourth official: Triphop Banrai

30 September 2020	Kanthararom United (T4)	1–3	Khon Kaen (T2)	Mueang, Sisaket
15:30 (UTC+7)	Artur Jesus Vieira 39' (o.g.)	Report	Thongchai Oampornwiman 16'; Apisit Yutimit 48' (o.g.); Aod Hala 90+3'	Stadium: Sri Nakhon Lamduan Stadium; Attendance: 500; Referee: Kristin Saisombat; Assistant referees: Anupong Sangtopo, Nuttapong Khunlert; Fourth official: Ruttapol Kongboonwas

30 September 2020	Pluakdaeng United (T3)	3–2	Khon Kaen United (T2)	Pluakdaeng, Rayong
15:30 (UTC+7)	Alberto Moreira Gouvea 48', 79'; Prin Prathummet 68'	Report	Phalakon Wokiang 14'; Piyawit Janput 44'	Stadium: CK Stadium; Attendance: 350; Referee: U-sen Yala; Assistant referees: Chaiyos Sripak, Watcharasak Intharak; Fourth official: Pongthep Raipimai

30 September 2020	Suwannaphum United (T4)	6–0	BSB Pakkret City (T4)	Mueang, Roiet
15:30 (UTC+7)	Chinnawat Poomipak 10', 36'; Anuchai Waralert 54'; Vichit Singloilom 72', 81'; Nitipat Aunsamai 75'	Report		Stadium: Roiet Provincial Stadium; Attendance: 40; Referee: Samart Kaikaew; Assistant referees: Seksan Wongkam, Ponlakrit Wangkoon; Fourth official: Suthat Ramom

30 September 2020	Udon United (T3)	4–3	Phitsanulok (T3)	Mueang, Udon Thani
15:30 (UTC+7)	Chawin Thirawatsri 30'; Park Jae-hyeong 34', 90'; Jetsada Batchari 90+2'	Report	Chatchai Narkwijit 23'; Wasan Chomkason 58', 60'	Stadium: Thailand National Sports University Udon Thani Campus Stadium; Attendance: 230; Referee: Patiyut Monthianart; Assistant referees: Nattapong Wadweangcom, Kittikun Soisee; Fourth official: Amnat Makklang

30 September 2020	Maejo United (T3)	2–2 (4–2 p)	Pattaya Discovery United (T3)	San Sai, Chiangmai
15:30 (UTC+7)	Kritsada Tapingyot 42'; Patipoom Jaiboon 79'	Report	Surat Suriyachai 38'; Thamanoon Salee 65'	Stadium: Maejo University Stadium; Attendance: 88; Referee: Natthawut Tasmak; Assistant referees: Bongkod Tiansavang, Teerayut Chantakun
	Penalties
	Kittipong Namsang (penalty scored); Wichaya Pornprasart (penalty scored); Chanwit Takamma (penalty scored); Roongrawin Pasopa (penalty scored)		(penalty scored) Pipat Thonkanya; (penalty missed) Jakkrapong Julkampa; (penalty scored) Woraphon Waeokhao; (penalty missed) Klanarong Mingkhwun

30 September 2020	Khon Kaen Mordindang (T3)	1–1 (5–4 p)	Sisaket (T2)	Mueang, Khon Kaen
15:30 (UTC+7)	Chunakorn Artnukarn 34'	Report	Kento Nagasaki 52'	Stadium: Khon Kaen University Stadium; Attendance: 106; Referee: Manut Pimol; Assistant referees: Kriangsak Pimsanit, Sahatnet Deemongkol; Fourth official: Sataporn Puritang
	Penalties
	Chunakorn Artnukarn (penalty scored); Anansak Joraanan (penalty missed); Sasipong Promduangdee (penalty scored); Kittin Lorjanad (penalty scored); Possawat Wichaiwong (penalty scored); Porramayut Phonchai (penalty scored)		(penalty scored) Kento Nagasaki; (penalty missed) Adisak Sensom-Eiad; (penalty scored) Wanit Chaisan; (penalty scored) Watchara Kaewlamul; (penalty scored) Nirut Jamroensri; (penalty missed) Alongkorn Prathumwong

30 September 2020	Bangkok (T3)	7–0	Roiet (T4)	Khlong Luang, Pathum Thani
15:30 (UTC+7)	Bunlue Thongkliang 1', 75'; Sakda Koomgun 45+2'; Supawit Rompopak 47', 83'; Chaowasit Sapysakunphon 58'; Natdanai Prompan 84' (o.g.)	Report		Stadium: Bangkok University Stadium; Attendance: 70; Referee: Chaikrit Inboonsong; Assistant referees: Manuschai Chawong, Veeraporn Maophaeo

30 September 2020	Hippo FC (T4)	1–2	See Khwae City (T3)	Sai Mai, Bangkok
15:30 (UTC+7)	Kissada Takammee 90+4'	Report	Eke Mbah 66'; Permyot Tokeaw 90'	Stadium: Grakcu United Stadium; Attendance: 55; Referee: Tosapornsil Sittisena

30 September 2020	Assawin Kohkwang United (T3)	0–2	Chiangrai City (T3)	Mueang, Chanthaburi
15:30 (UTC+7)		Report	Suriphat Thaensopa 44'; Trin Roengnapaphon 76'	Stadium: Rambhai Barni Rajabhat University Stadium; Attendance: 300; Referee: Chinnaphat Lablae; Assistant referees: Kamphol Kaewsaard; Fourth official: Suchat Fangmala

30 September 2020	Nakhon Ratchasima United (T3)	2–2 (4–5 p)	Lamphun Warrior (T3)	Mueang, Nakhon Ratchasima
15:30 (UTC+7)	Vinicius Silva Freitas 45+4' (pen.), 70'	Report	Mairon Natan Pereira Maciel Oliveira 29', 45'	Stadium: 80th Birthday Stadium; Referee: Yodsakorn Pakdeesuwan; Assistant referees: Thapornchai Chaowai; Fourth official: Teeramate Pooprang
	Penalties
	John Panoiwong (penalty scored); Nitirat Wiangdindam (penalty missed); Vinicius Silva Freitas (penalty scored); Sirisak Kaykaeo (penalty scored); Teerasak Ngamsaeng (penalty scored); Sakdinon Jumpha (penalty missed)		(penalty scored) Mairon Natan Pereira Maciel Oliveira; (penalty scored) Athit Wisetsilp; (penalty missed) Whitsanusak Ounnoy; (penalty scored) Adul Lahsoh; (penalty scored) Phakin Sinmonthakit; (penalty scored) Anuntachok Yodsangwal

30 September 2020	Sing Ubon (T4)	2–3	Don Mueang MPS (T4)	Bang Sai, Ayutthaya
15:30 (UTC+7)	Thanapol Vetchaya 66'; Sathit Kritsanakan 78'	Report	Intouch Yamyindee 23'; Patcharasit Yapradit 30'; Santipong Vongviboon 45'	Stadium: Ratchakram Stadium; Referee: Sakda Jitsupavorakul; Assistant referees: Seree Kaewprom, Apiwich Mukdahan; Fourth official: Pichit Thongjanmoon

30 September 2020	Kamphaengphet (T3)	5–0	Institute of Entrepreneurial Science Ayothaya (T4)	Mueang, Kamphaengphet
15:30 (UTC+7)	Sittiphong Kanlapaprug 39'; Thanaphat Wutcharasil 61'; Kawin Nuanthat 64', 83'; Thanongsak Duangjaikaew 70'	Report; News		Stadium: Kamphaengphet PAO. Stadium; Referee: Poowasak Sukunt; Assistant referees: Tulakan Khamthai

30 September 2020	Surat Thani City (T3)	1–1 (4–5 p)	Songkhla (T3)	Wiang Sa, Surat Thani
15:30 (UTC+7)	Apiwut Vongsomboon 90+3'	Report	Anusak Laosangthai 8'	Stadium: Ban Song Municipality Stadium; Attendance: 300; Referee: Wichai Pannil; Assistant referees: Sukarnai Beraheng, Prasertsak Santiphithakphakdee; Fourth official: Jiraphan Yodphut
	Penalties
	Patarawee Chaysut (penalty missed); Pongsakorn Klinsaowakon (penalty scored); Suttipong Yaifai (penalty scored); Wachirawit Apinantachat (penalty missed); Emmanuel Nwachi (penalty scored); Sarawut Chitthai (penalty missed); Toloba Aremu Kassim Mouyidine (penalty scored); Kittipong Rongrak (penalty missed)		(penalty missed) Akkarapol Meesawat; (penalty scored) Basree Sanron; (penalty missed) Marlon Henrique Brandão da Silva; (penalty scored) Peerawis Ritsriboon; (penalty scored) Yodsawat Montha; (penalty missed) Thammasak Thammarak; (penalty scored) Khoiree Layeng; (penalty scored) Chanukorn Srirak

30 September 2020	Wat Bot City (T3)	3–0	Siam (T3)	Mueang, Phitsanulok
15:30 (UTC+7)	Phatsaphon Choedvichit 28', 55', 86'	Report		Stadium: Phitsanulok PAO. Stadium; Attendance: 121; Referee: Attapon Bolen; Assistant referees: Teerapong Oma, Chalit Ploypech

30 September 2020	Rajpracha (T3)	2–0	JT (T4)	Thanyaburi, Pathum Thani
17:00 (UTC+7)	Rosalvo Cândido Rosa Júnior 17', 57'	Report; Highlight		Stadium: Leo Stadium; Referee: Virittpol Pleumsilp; Assistant referees: Saravut Suksalee, Chinnaphat N Fourth official: Arun Budtasee

30 September 2020	Nonthaburi United S.Boonmeerit (T3)	8–1	Nakhon Ratchasima Prokick United (T4)	Mueang, Nonthaburi
18:00 (UTC+7)	Natthawut Sukaram 22', 44', 73', 81'; Ahmed Ayman Shamsaldin Abdalazem 47', 59'; Woraphot Somsang 79'; Padungsak Phothinak 85'	Report	Sonthaya Teepumee 90'	Stadium: Nonthaburi Provincial Stadium; Attendance: 80; Referee: Winai Riangwong; Assistant referees: Pathompong Anunluksanakul, Jakkaphan Rinsarn; Fourth official: Samrit Ritkaew

30 September 2020	MOF Customs United (T2)	0–0 (4–1 p)	Uthai Thani (T2)	Bang Phli, Samut Prakan
18:00 (UTC+7)		Report		Stadium: Lad Krabang 54 Stadium; Attendance: 350; Referee: Wichate Tainthong; Assistant referees: Dumrongchai Chuangaroen, Anucha Pinamon; Fourth official: Komgrit Ponpasit
	Penalties
	Kenzo Nambu (penalty scored); Chakrit Buathong (penalty scored); Anders Viktor Löfgren (penalty scored); Nattapon Wolatayanun (penalty scored)		(penalty scored) Suphawit Chusaksakunviboon; (penalty missed) Park Jong-oh; (penalty missed) Suchon Sanguandee

30 September 2020	Chachoengsao Hi-Tek (T3)	3–0	Rasisalai United (T4)	Mueang, Chachoengsao
18:30 (UTC+7)	Sarawut Choenchai 44'; Tiwa Sangsomboon 86'; Lucas Massaro Garcia Gama 90+2'	Report		Stadium: Chachoengsao Municipality Stadium; Attendance: 403; Referee: Suttipong Tepa; Assistant referees: Phumin Lamnamthiang, Chomrat Yukcharoensap; Fourth official: Atthachai Kongkaew

30 September 2020	Nakhon Pathom United (T2)	2–2 (1–3 p)	Chainat Hornbill (T2)	Mueang, Nakhon Pathom
19:00 (UTC+7)	Nantanat Toornee 39' (o.g.); Pummared Kladkleed 75'	Report	Tanasorn Janthrakhot 56'; Nantanat Toornee 72'	Stadium: Nakhon Pathom Municipality Sport School Stadium; Attendance: 338; Referee: Chaiwat Boonsong; Assistant referees: Tussanai Sarobon, Sarayut Sriampri; Fourth official: Boonsong Prachumrak
	Penalties
	Teerayut Ngamlamai (penalty missed); Pummared Kladkleed (penalty scored); Nattanan Biesamrit (penalty missed); Krissana Nontharak (penalty missed)		(penalty scored) Sumet Yooto; (penalty scored) Krailas Panyaroj; (penalty scored) Pongsakorn Poonsamrit

=== First round ===
The first round would be featured by 27 clubs which were the winners of the qualification round including 4 clubs from T2, 17 clubs from T3, and 6 clubs from T4 and the new entries including 16 clubs from 2020–21 Thai League 1, 5 clubs from 2020–21 Thai League 2, 7 clubs from 2020–21 Thai League 3, and 9 clubs from Thailand Amateur League. This round had drawn on 22 October 2020.

7 November 2020	Bangkok (T3)	2–4 (a.e.t.)	Port (T1)	Khlong Luang, Pathum Thani
15:00 (UTC+7)	Supawit Rompopak 17'; Sakda Koomgun 87'	Report	Nelson Bonilla 73'; Sergio Suárez 75'; Charyl Chappuis 92'; Thitathorn Aksornsri 103'	Stadium: Bangkok University Stadium; Attendance: 309; Referee: Niwat Insa-ard; Assistant referees: Rachain Srichai, Natthaphon Mala; Fourth official: Paisan Bendem-alee

7 November 2020	Sawankhalok United (T4)	0–4	Bang Pa-in Ayutthaya (T3)	Sawankhalok, Sukhothai
15:00 (UTC+7)		Report	Sarayut Yoosuebchuea 15', 43'; Kueanun Junumpai 65', 74'	Stadium: Sawankhalok Prachasan Municipal School Stadium; Attendance: 110; Referee: Virittpol Pluemsilp; Assistant referees: Triphop Banrai, Thanet Jairaw; Fourth official: Yuttana Sadkrathok

7 November 2020	Muangkan United (T3)	11–0	Nam Phong City (T4)	Mueang, Kanchanaburi
15:00 (UTC+7)	Bireme Diouf 9', 13'; Ailton Machado 10', 43', 69', 88'; Ekasit Sudsavaht 46', 84'; Rattasak Wiang-in 62'; Amornthep Nilnoy 75'; Peemmawat Cheewayaphan 79'	Report		Stadium: Kanchanaburi Provincial Stadium; Attendance: 306; Referee: Alongkorn Khonwai; Assistant referees: Kittichai Huthip, Chanayut Kaiwijit; Fourth official: Jarun Janeam

7 November 2020	Buengsamphan (T4)	2–3	Navy (T2)	Mueang, Phetchabun
15:00 (UTC+7)	Wirut Mongkhonchatoen 41' (pen.); Kiadtisak Thunsap 66'	Report	Kanokphol Nuchrungrueang 24', 64'; Sirichai Phumpat 68'	Stadium: Phetchabun Provincial Stadium; Attendance: 150; Referee: Peerasan Krataithong; Assistant referees: Nissan Janthep, Apichat Prasasak; Fourth official: Piyapong Thongkhain

7 November 2020	Khon Kaen Mordindang (T3)	0–7	PT Prachuap (T1)	Mueang, Khon Kaen
15:00 (UTC+7)		Report	Weerawut Kayem 9'; Willen Mota 42', 44', 63'; Phanuwat Jinta 49'; Peerawat Akkratum 70'; Amorn Thammanarm 90+2'	Stadium: Khon Kaen University Stadium; Attendance: 250; Referee: Teetichai Nualjan; Assistant referees: Tanin Reunjit, Srisuwan Boonnum; Fourth official: Wiwat Jumpa-on

7 November 2020	Pakchong SCK (T4)	0–1	Don Mueang MPS (T4)	Muaklek, Saraburi
15:00 (UTC+7)		Report	Anuchon Phanduong 77'	Stadium: Stadium of National Sports Training Center, Muaklek; Referee: Tosapornsil Sittisena; Assistant referees: Winai Charoenpong, Haroot Himbenmut; Fourth official: Phadoongkiat Piangdee

7 November 2020	Techno Sawang (T4)	0–1	Dome (T4)	Mueang, Sakon Nakhon
15:00 (UTC+7)		Report	Channarong Ruennetaporn 90+3'	Stadium: Sakon Nakhon Rajabhat University Stadium; Attendance: 350; Referee: Worawut Siriwong; Assistant referees: Watchara Puangmee, Atiwat Yapakdee; Fourth official: Chairat Phooalai

7 November 2020	Nakhon Ratchasima Municipality Sport School (T4)	0–3	MOF Customs United (T2)	Mueang, Nakhon Ratchasima
15:00 (UTC+7)		Report	Armah Ayo Vaikainah 7'; Suradech Thongchai 13'; Jirattikarn Vapilai 33'	Stadium: Nakhon Ratchasima Rajabhat University Stadium; Attendance: 320; Referee: Manut Pimol; Assistant referees: Pramote Boon-in, Narong Hansuk; Fourth official: Jirawit Phonkaew

7 November 2020	Songkhla (T3)	9–0	Suwannaphum United (T4)	Mueang, Songkhla
15:00 (UTC+7)	Khoiree Layeng 4'; Apdussalam Saman 7', 25'; Han Yun-soo 12'; Chanukorn Srirak 33'; Marlon Henrique Brandão da Silva 63'; Kittiphant Chanpho 68'; Akrapol Meesawad 83'; Chairat Madsiri 90'	Report; Highlight		Stadium: Tinsulanon Stadium; Attendance: 212; Referee: Watcharin Nootong; Assistant referees: Mayunai Kueteh, Hasadin Noorid; Fourth official: Nattawut Sangpan

7 November 2020	Nakhon Ratchasima Mazda (T1)	0–1	Samut Prakan City (T1)	Mueang, Nakhon Ratchasima
17:00 (UTC+7)		Report	Teeraphol Yoryoei 15'	Stadium: 80th Birthday Stadium; Attendance: 975; Referee: Sivakorn Pu-udom; Assistant referees: Tanate Chuchuen, Pattarapong Kijsathit; Fourth official: Tastarawut Khantavichai

7 November 2020	Rajpracha (T3)	1–4	Police Tero (T1)	Thanyaburi, Pathum Thani
17:00 (UTC+7)	Rosalvo Cândido Rosa Júnior 89'	Report; Highlight	Kwon Dae-hee 18'; Arthit Boodjinda 58'; Jaturong Pimkoon 75'; Nattawut Munsuwan 87'	Stadium: Leo Stadium; Attendance: 328; Referee: Natee Choosuwan; Assistant referees: Narin Wongprapipak, Sila Jinnigorn; Fourth official: Vitsavet Sangnakorn

7 November 2020	Bangkok United (T1)	5–1	Kasem Bundit University (T3)	Khlong Luang, Pathum Thani
18:00 (UTC+7)	Brenner Marlos 24', 50'; Chananan Pombuppha 41', 44'; Anon Amornlerdsak 77'	Report	Ibrahim Abou Dicko 53'	Stadium: Thammasat Stadium; Attendance: 726; Referee: Akom Charoensuk; Assistant referees: Sumate Peasiri, Yossapon Tongprom; Fourth official: Kotchapoom Meesridaecha

7 November 2020	Nongbua Pitchaya (T2)	1–0	Chiangmai United (T2)	Mueang, Nongbua Lamphu
18:00 (UTC+7)	Kitsana Kasemkulwilai 10'	Report		Stadium: Pitchaya Stadium; Attendance: 784; Referee: Seksan Phansri; Assistant referees: Anupong Sangtopo, Jirauy Bussabok; Fourth official: Anupong Duangsri

7 November 2020	Buriram United (T1)	9–0	Samut Songkhram (T3)	Mueang, Buriram
18:00 (UTC+7)	Marko Šćepović 13'; Apiwat Ngaolamhin 24', 40', 85'; Sarayut Sompim 44'; Supachai Jaided 68'; Gidi Kanyuk 70'; Narubadin Weerawatnodom 80'; Supachok Sarachat 90'	Report		Stadium: Chang Arena; Attendance: 6,153; Referee: Noppadet Mangngam; Assistant referees: Apichit Nophuan, Chotrawee Tongduang; Fourth official: Phairot Bunkamnoed

7 November 2020	Sukhothai (T1)	9–1	Surindra YMA (T4)	Mueang, Sukhothai
18:00 (UTC+7)	Woranat Thongkruea 7', 32'; Muhammadnasay Kolae 18', 57', 85'; Pongpat Liorungrueangkit 39', 53'; Kanpitcha Chanakaree 69'; Ekkasit Chaobut 87'	Report	Kittiphat Deeduangpan 82'	Stadium: Thalay Luang Stadium; Attendance: 680; Referee: Sarayut Jakngoen; Assistant referees: Teerapon Sunyapluem, Waranyoo Chomgoson; Fourth official: Torphong Somsing

7 November 2020	Chiangrai United (T1)	2–1	Nonthaburi United S.Boonmeerit (T3)	Mueang, Chiangrai
18:00 (UTC+7)	Akarawin Sawasdee 57'; Bill 88'	Report	Jedsadaporn Yongyingphoon 41'	Stadium: Singha Stadium; Attendance: 455; Referee: Anusorn Nookaew; Assistant referees: Binla Preeda, Chaiya Sripak; Fourth official: Woottipong Ketkam

8 November 2020	Kranuan (T4)	0–5	Muang Loei United (T3)	Mueang, Khon Kaen
15:00 (UTC+7)		Report	Aboubacar Junior Diarra 41', 47', 89'; Somnuek Singkaree 78'; Amporn Chaipong 90+1'	Stadium: Khon Kaen PAO. Stadium; Attendance: 204; Referee: Patiyut Monthianart; Assistant referees: Kittipong Pholdee, Weerasak Dookkhumnoom; Fourth official: Thanongsak Hinprakob

8 November 2020	Banbueng (T3)	2–3	Udon United (T3)	Mueang, Chonburi
15:00 (UTC+7)	Warakorn Thongbai 56', 65' (pen.)	Report	Jakkrawut Songma 34'; Jardel Capistrano 70'; Wutthichai Marom 79'	Stadium: Chonburi Stadium; Attendance: 200; Referee: Suttipong Tepa; Assistant referees: Wararit Suwanjira, Kamron Jitsom; Fourth official: Palathip Homwarn

8 November 2020	Prachinburi City (T4)	1–3	Ratchaburi Mitr Phol (T1)	Mueang, Prachinburi
15:00 (UTC+7)	Chanin Yantasri 25'	Report	Chitpanya Tisud 12', 44'; Sittichok Kannoo 63'	Stadium: Prachinburi PAO. Stadium; Attendance: 729; Referee: Warintron Sassadee; Assistant referees: Phubes Lekpha, Kanchit Nittayachart; Fourth official: Pongthep Raipimai

8 November 2020	Maejo United (T3)	2–0	Chachoengsao Hi-Tek (T3)	San Sai, Chiangmai
15:00 (UTC+7)	Kittipong Namsang 37'; Kritsada Tapingyot 85'	Report		Stadium: Maejo University Stadium; Attendance: 35; Referee: Sarawut Tawiya; Assistant referees: Duangkaew Duangtawan, Saharat Patison; Fourth official: Nattawut Pornchaiwirun

8 November 2020	Kamphaengphet (T3)	0–1	Chiangrai City (T3)	Mueang, Kamphaengphet
15:00 (UTC+7)		Report	Chaiyahan Aunjit 5'	Stadium: Kamphaengphet PAO. Stadium; Attendance: 100; Referee: Jirapan Thewa-anukhroh; Assistant referees: Natthawut Tasmak, Surasak Phoomiwanna; Fourth official: Suthipong Ontuwong

8 November 2020	Wat Bot City (T3)	3–2 (a.e.t.)	Bankhai United (T3)	Mueang, Phitsanulok
15:00 (UTC+7)	Rafinha 15'; Diarrassouba Hamed de Silci 109'; Phatsaphon Choedvichit 119'	Report; Highlight	Burnel Okana-Stazi 77', 120+2' (pen.)	Stadium: Phitsanulok PAO. Stadium; Attendance: 166; Referee: Wathanyu Morin; Assistant referees: Anurak Nuamhian, Tulakan Khamthai; Fourth official: Panuwat Khutjaiwong

8 November 2020	Pluakdaeng United (T3)	6–1	Nakhon Nayok (T4)	Pluakdaeng, Rayong
15:00 (UTC+7)	Alongkorn Nuekmai 9', 55'; Apirat Heemkhaw 61', 65'; Kritthanaphong Paisanakkarapol 75', 77'	Report	Saharat Kongkunchad 38'	Stadium: CK Stadium; Attendance: 182; Referee: Somsuk Poosomnuek; Assistant referees: Panya Nawasimainam

8 November 2020	See Khwae City (T3)	0–1	Lamphun Warrior (T3)	Mueang, Nakhon Sawan
15:00 (UTC+7)		Report	Tanakorn Navanit 68'	Stadium: Nakhon Sawan Sport School Stadium; Attendance: 177; Referee: Witthaya Kamhem; Assistant referees: Suttinan Kanchana, Chaiwat Mukda; Fourth official: Tanakrit Fuengsakul

8 November 2020	Kalasin Sauropod (T4)	0–7	Chonburi (T1)	Mueang, Kalasin
15:00 (UTC+7)		Report; Highlight	Phanuphong Phonsa 14', 90+3'; Teeratep Winothai 23', 49', 90'; Narathip Kruearanya 43'; Kritsada Kaman 52'	Stadium: Kalasin Provincial Stadium; Attendance: 1,779; Referee: Atiwat Seelalo; Assistant referees: Chaowalit Poonprasit, Kasama Loyma; Fourth official: Kristin Saisombat

8 November 2020	Chiangmai (T2)	3–1 (a.e.t.)	Uttaradit (T3)	Mueang, Chiangmai
17:00 (UTC+7)	Ryo Matsumura 31'; Nattapoom Maya 116', 118'	Report	Anucha Phantong 27'	Stadium: Chiangmai Municipality Stadium; Attendance: 796; Referee: Wachirapan Prasomphon; Assistant referees: Songrit Trakulchai, Nuannid Donjangreed; Fourth official: Puttiphong Isising

8 November 2020	Marines Eureka (T3)	1–4	Suphanburi (T1)	Sattahip, Chonburi
17:00 (UTC+7)	Aittipol Panadee 3'	Report	Ratchanat Arunyapairot 16'; Sirimongkhon Jitbanjong 17'; Eliandro 24', 42' (pen.)	Stadium: Sattahip Navy Stadium; Attendance: 140; Referee: Paisan Bendem-alee; Assistant referees: Komsan Kampan, Banpot Khunhong; Fourth official: Sivakorn Pu-udom

8 November 2020	Lampang (T2)	2–0	Khon Kaen (T2)	Mueang, Lampang
17:00 (UTC+7)	Alex Rafael 70'; Douglas Mineiro 90+3' (pen.)	Report		Stadium: Lampang Provincial Stadium; Attendance: 295; Referee: Wichate Tainthong; Assistant referees: Pakorn Srichumsin, Supawan Hinthong; Fourth official: Wittaya Junejan

8 November 2020	Chainat Hornbill (T2)	0–1	Trat (T1)	Mueang, Chainat
18:00 (UTC+7)		Report	Suttinan Phuk-hom 51'	Stadium: Khao Plong Stadium; Attendance: 641; Referee: Songkran Bunmeekiart; Assistant referees: Suriya Lee-intr, Vichet Getkaew; Fourth official: Suwat Wongsuwan

8 November 2020	Udon Thani (T2)	1–2 (a.e.t.)	BG Pathum United (T1)	Mueang, Udon Thani
18:00 (UTC+7)	Aleksandar Kapisoda 90'	Report	Thitiphan Puangjan 55'; Chaowat Veerachat 97'	Stadium: Stadium of Thailand National Sports University, Udon Thani campus Attendance: 2,475; Referee: Chaireang Ngam-som; Assistant referees: Poonsawat Samransuk, Worapong Prasartsri; Fourth official: Akom Charoensuk

8 November 2020	Rayong (T1)	3–1	Krabi (T3)	Mueang, Rayong
18:00 (UTC+7)	Yordrak Namuangrak 12', 35' (pen.); Sirisak Fufung 67'	Report	Techin Mooktarakosa 28'	Stadium: Rayong Provincial Stadium; Attendance: 240; Referee: Winat Phophat; Assistant referees: Rachan Dawangpa, Ruangsak Nupuak; Fourth official: Satchukorn Saenchu

8 November 2020	SCG Muangthong United (T1)	10–0	Phatthananikhom City (T4)	Pak Kret, Nonthaburi
19:00 (UTC+7)	Poramet Arjvirai 24' (pen.), 44', 69'; Saharat Kanyaroj 51'; Phumin Kaewta 65', 78', 86'; Sundy Wongderree 82'; Sorawit Panthong 84', 90'	Report		Stadium: SCG Stadium; Attendance: 2,405; Referee: Tastarawut Khantavichai; Assistant referees: Kitisak Pikunngoen, Watthana Chonchanakul; Fourth official: Natee Choosuwan

=== Second round ===
The second round would be featured by 32 clubs which were the winners of the first round including 15 clubs from T1, 5 clubs from T2, 10 clubs from T3, and 2 clubs from T4. This round had drawn on 12 November 2020.

5 December 2020	Muangkan United (T3)	3–0	Don Mueang MPS (T4)	Mueang, Kanchanaburi
15:00 (UTC+7)	Yuttana Ruangsuksut 58', 76'; Panudech Suabpeng 71'	Report		Stadium: Kanchanaburi Provincial Stadium; Attendance: 535; Referee: Veeraporn Maophaeo; Assistant referees: Thanet Jairaw, Authen Dansalao; Fourth official: Virittpol Pluemsilp

5 December 2020	Udon United (T3)	2–0	Navy (T2)	Mueang, Udon Thani
15:00 (UTC+7)	Jardel Capistrano 3'; Jakkrawut Songma 47'	Report		Stadium: Thailand National Sports University Udon Thani Campus Stadium; Attendance: 453; Referee: Pongthep Raipimai; Assistant referees: Thitibodi Rumnet, Jirauy Bussabok; Fourth official: Seksan Phansri

5 December 2020	Samut Prakan City (T1)	3–0	Maejo United (T3)	Bang Sao Thong, Samut Prakan
18:00 (UTC+7)	Barros Tardeli 10'; Peeradon Chamratsamee 75', 90+3'	Report		Stadium: Samut Prakan Stadium; Attendance: 603; Referee: Kotchapoom Meesridaecha; Assistant referees: Binla Preeda, Chaiya Sripak; Fourth official: Wiwat Jumpaoon

5 December 2020	Bangkok United (T1)	7–2	Chiangrai City (T3)	Khlong Luang, Pathum Thani
18:00 (UTC+7)	Chananan Pombuppha 9', 73'; Anon Amornlerdsak 19'; Rungrath Poomchantuek 27', 50'; Putthinan Wannasri 40'; Chayathorn Tapsuvanavon 84'	Report	Chaiyahan Aunjit 44'; Nantawat Tansopa 76'	Stadium: Thammasat Stadium; Attendance: 1,238; Referee: Paisan Bendem-alee; Assistant referees: Tanin Reunjit, Natthaphon Mala; Fourth official: Chaiya Moolmanee

5 December 2020	Lamphun Warrior (T3)	1–2	Chonburi (T1)	Mueang, Lamphun
18:00 (UTC+7)	Chayanon Khamkan 63'	Report; Highlight	Caion 36' (pen.); Kroekrit Thaweekarn 40'	Stadium: Lamphun Provincial Stadium; Attendance: 2,173; Referee: Winat Phophat; Assistant referees: Komsan Kampan, Banpot Khunhong; Fourth official: Teetichai Nualjan

5 December 2020	Nongbua Pitchaya (T2)	2–1	PT Prachuap (T1)	Mueang, Nongbua Lamphu
18:00 (UTC+7)	Rakpong Chumuang 38'; Tiago Chulapa 59'	Report; Highlight	William Henrique 90+1'	Stadium: Pitchaya Stadium; Attendance: 934; Referee: Tastarawut Khantavichai; Assistant referees: Chotrawee Tongduang, Sumate Peasiri; Fourth official: Anusorn Nookaew

5 December 2020	Rayong (T1)	1–3	Ratchaburi Mitr Phol (T1)	Mueang, Rayong
19:00 (UTC+7)	Mehti Sarakham 60'	Report; Highlight	Apiwat Pengprakon 11', 64'; Sittichok Kannoo 23'	Stadium: Rayong Provincial Stadium; Attendance: 554; Referee: Vitsavet Sangnakorn; Assistant referees: Apichit Nophuan, Kitisak Pikunngoen; Fourth official: Torphong Somsing

6 December 2020	Muang Loei United (T3)	1–0 (a.e.t.)	Bang Pa-in Ayutthaya (T3)	Mueang, Loei
15:00 (UTC+7)	Célio Guilherme da Silva Santos 115'	Report		Stadium: Loei Provincial Stadium; Attendance: 349; Referee: Teeramate Pooprang; Assistant referees: Nattakit Chaiyakhun, Kittiphan Kunlasing; Fourth official: Yossatorn Srisakhot

6 December 2020	Pluakdaeng United (T3)	2–5	Trat (T1)	Pluakdaeng, Rayong
15:00 (UTC+7)	Alberto Moreira Gouvea 57'; Chayapon Chahveejan 85'	Report; Highlight	Jonatan Ferreira Reis 15', 47', 58'; Sittichok Paso 25', 80'	Stadium: CK Stadium; Attendance: 343; Referee: Panumas Phansamo; Assistant referees: Pattarapong Kijsathit, Yossapon Tongprom; Fourth official: Krisda Luangyos

6 December 2020	Wat Bot City (T3)	3–4 (a.e.t.)	Songkhla (T3)	Mueang, Phitsanulok
15:00 (UTC+7)	Rafinha 6', 66'; Rachen Kunkhong 71'	Report; Highlight	Nasree Dueloh 19'; Thammasak Thammarak 45+1'; Yodsawat Montha 90+3' (pen.); Akkarapol Meesawat 114'	Stadium: Phitsanulok PAO. Stadium; Attendance: 246; Referee: Sarawut Tawiya; Assistant referees: Nonthanan Khanthawong, Teerapong Oma; Fourth official: Direk Kaort

6 December 2020	Lampang (T2)	0–4	Suphanburi (T1)	Mueang, Lampang
15:00 (UTC+7)		Report	Patrick Reichelt 3'; Kasidech Wettayawong 44'; Eliandro 69', 71'	Stadium: Lampang Provincial Stadium; Attendance: 519; Referee: Noppadet Mangngam; Assistant referees: Tanate Chuchuen, Narin Wongprapipak; Fourth official: U-sen Yala

6 December 2020	Dome (T4)	1–4	Chiangmai (T2)	Khlong Luang, Pathum Thani
18:00 (UTC+7)	Panuwit Sriwichai 76'	Report	Meedech Sarayuthpisai 33'; Nattachai Srisuwan 42'; Ryo Matsumura 49', 67'	Stadium: Thammasat Stadium; Attendance: 300; Referee: Kriangsak Keattisongkram; Assistant referees: Tussanai Sarobon, Watcharasak Intharak; Fourth official: Anupong Duangsri

6 December 2020	SCG Muangthong United (T1)	2–1 (a.e.t.)	BG Pathum United (T1)	Pak Kret, Nonthaburi
18:00 (UTC+7)	Sardor Mirzaev 5'; Suporn Peenagatapho 103'	Report	Andrés Túñez 65'	Stadium: SCG Stadium; Attendance: 4,223; Referee: Songkran Bunmeekiart; Assistant referees: Suriya Lee-intr, Srisuwan Boonnum; Fourth official: Niwat Insa-ard

6 December 2020	Buriram United (T1)	4–0	Police Tero (T1)	Mueang, Buriram
18:00 (UTC+7)	Jakkaphan Kaewprom 18'; Supachai Jaided 45', 90'; Supachok Sarachat 90+2'	Report		Stadium: Chang Arena; Attendance: 4,960; Referee: Chaireang Ngam-som; Assistant referees: Poonsawat Samransuk, Watthana Chonchanakul; Fourth official: Atiwat Seelalo

6 December 2020	Port (T1)	6–3	MOF Customs United (T2)	Khlong Toei, Bangkok
18:00 (UTC+7)	Nattawut Sombatyotha 12', 25'; Adisak Kraisorn 75'; Nelson Bonilla 78', 90+3'; David Rochela 90' (pen.)	Report	Deyvison Fernandes de Oliveira 56', 64' (pen.); Rachata Thanaphonmongkhon 90+1'	Stadium: PAT Stadium; Attendance: 1,903; Referee: Sarayut Jakngoen; Assistant referees: Wirot Lokham, Kasama Loyma; Fourth official: Komgrit Ponpasit

30 December 2020	Chiangrai United (T1)	1–0	Sukhothai (T1)	Mueang, Chiangrai
18:00 (UTC+7)	Bill 75' (pen.)	Report; Highlight		Stadium: Singha Stadium; Attendance: 1,011; Referee: Chaireang Ngam-som; Assistant referees: Phubes Lekpha, Worapong Prasartsri; Fourth official: Kotchapoom Meesridaecha

=== Third round ===
The third round would be featured by 16 clubs which were the winners of the second round including 10 clubs from T1, 2 clubs from T2, and 4 clubs from T3. This round had drawn on 15 December 2020.

3 February 2021	Muang Loei United (T3)	2–5	Chiangrai United (T1)	Mueang, Loei
15:00 (UTC+7)	Julius Chukwuma Ononiwu 13'; Diarra Junior Aboubacar 72'	Report; Highlight	Akarawin Sawasdee 12'; Bill 26', 38', 47' (pen.); Chaiyawat Buran 85'	Stadium: Loei Provincial Stadium; Attendance: 0 Referee: Kotchapoom Meesridaecha; Assistant referees: Banpot Khunhong, Sumate Peasiri; Fourth official: Panumas Phansamo

3 February 2021	Udon United (T3)	0–2	Bangkok United (T1)	Mueang, Udon Thani
15:00 (UTC+7)		Report; Highlight	Nattawut Suksum 51', 62'	Stadium: Thailand National Sports University Udon Thani Campus Stadium; Attendance: 0 Referee: Songkran Bunmeekiart; Assistant referees: Rachan Dawangpa, Wirot Lokham; Fourth official: Vitsavet Sangnakorn

3 February 2021	Songkhla (T3)	1–2 (a.e.t.)	Ratchaburi Mitr Phol (T1)	Mueang, Songkhla
15:00 (UTC+7)	Marlon Henrique Brandão da Silva 58'	Report; Highlight	Pravinwat Boonyong 43'; Apiwat Pengprakon 108'	Stadium: Tinsulanon Stadium; Attendance: 0 Referee: Natee Choosuwan; Assistant referees: Binla Preeda, Teerapon Sunyapluem; Fourth official: Atiwat Seelalo

3 February 2021	Muangkan United (T3)	1–0	Nongbua Pitchaya (T2)	Mueang, Kanchanaburi
15:00 (UTC+7)	Stéfano Yuri 27'	Report; Highlight		Stadium: Kanchanaburi Provincial Stadium; Attendance: 0 Referee: Putthipong Issising; Assistant referees: Sadsampan Kunsakoo, Khomchalach Lekhawijit; Fourth official: Boonsong Prachumrak

3 February 2021	Port (T1)	0–0 (a.e.t.) (8–9 p)	Buriram United (T1)	Khlong Toei, Bangkok
18:00 (UTC+7)		Report; Highlight		Stadium: PAT Stadium; Attendance: 0 Referee: Chaireang Ngam-som; Assistant referees: Tanate Chuchuen, Komsan Kampan; Fourth official: Teetichai Nualjan
	Penalties
	David Rochela (penalty scored); Sergio Suárez (penalty scored); Siwakorn Jakkuprasat (penalty scored); Go Seul-ki (penalty scored); Adisak Kraisorn (penalty scored); Tanasith Siripala (penalty missed); Nattawut Sombatyotha (penalty scored); Kevin Deeromram (penalty scored); Nitipong Selanon (penalty scored); Tanaboon Kesarat (penalty missed)		(penalty scored) Ratthanakorn Maikami; (penalty scored) Sasalak Haiprakhon; (penalty scored) Pansa Hemviboon; (penalty scored) Suphanat Mueanta; (penalty scored) Siwarak Tedsungnoen; (penalty missed) Chakkit Laptrakul; (penalty scored) Maicon Marques; (penalty scored) Tinnakorn Asurin; (penalty scored) Jakkaphan Kaewprom; (penalty scored) Narubadin Weerawatnodom

3 February 2021	Trat (T1)	1–0	Chiangmai (T2)	Mueang, Trat
18:00 (UTC+7)	Mongkol Tossakrai 23'	Report; Highlight		Stadium: Trat Provincial Stadium; Attendance: 0 Referee: Warintron Sassadee; Assistant referees: Suriya Lee-intr, Srisuwan Boonnum; Fourth official: Winat Phophat

3 February 2021	Chonburi (T1)	3–0	Suphanburi (T1)	Mueang, Chonburi
19:00 (UTC+7)	Eliandro 12'; Worachit Kanitsribampen 54'; Settawut Wongsai 90+2'	Report; Highlight		Stadium: Chonburi Stadium; Attendance: 0 Referee: Mongkolchai Pechsri; Assistant referees: Pattarapong Kijsathit, Tanin Reunjit; Fourth official: Sivakorn Pu-udom

3 February 2021	SCG Muangthong United (T1)	1–0	Samut Prakan City (T1)	Pak Kret, Nonthaburi
19:00 (UTC+7)	Wattana Playnum 6'	Report; Highlight		Stadium: SCG Stadium; Attendance: 0 Referee: Sarayut Jakngoen; Assistant referees: Poonsawat Samransuk, Rachain Srichai; Fourth official: Anusorn Nookaew

=== Quarter-finals ===
The quarter-finals would be featured by 8 clubs which were the winners of the third round including 7 clubs from T1 and 1 club from T3. This round had drawn on 1 March 2021.

3 April 2021	Chiangrai United (T1)	2–1	Muangkan United (T3)	Mueang, Chiangrai
18:00 (UTC+7)	Bill 45', 73'	Report; Highlight	Chakrit Rawanprakone 13'	Stadium: Singha Stadium; Attendance: 1,563; Referee: Mongkolchai Pechsri; Assistant referees: Vichet Getkaew, Kitisak Pikunngoen; Fourth official: Tastarawut Khantavichai

3 April 2021	Buriram United (T1)	2–0	SCG Muangthong United (T1)	Mueang, Buriram
18:00 (UTC+7)	Samuel Rosa 72' (pen.); Supachok Sarachat 77'	Report; Highlight		Stadium: Chang Arena; Attendance: 16,300; Referee: Wiwat Jumpaoon; Assistant referees: Tanate Chuchuen, Rawut Nakarit; Fourth official: Kotchapoom Meesridaecha

3 April 2021	Bangkok United (T1)	2–1	Ratchaburi Mitr Phol (T1)	Khlong Luang, Pathum Thani
19:00 (UTC+7)	Heberty 24'; Peerapat Notchaiya 84'	Report; Highlight	Simon Dia 54'	Stadium: Thammasat Stadium; Attendance: 3,025; Referee: Chaireang Ngam-som; Assistant referees: Apichit Nophuan, Worapong Prasartsri; Fourth official: Panumas Phansamo

3 April 2021	Chonburi (T1)	5–1	Trat (T1)	Mueang, Chonburi
19:00 (UTC+7)	Eliandro 1', 23', 66'; Chatmongkol Rueangthanarot 18'; Phanuphong Phonsa 90+1'	Report; Highlight	Ricardo Santos 49' (pen.)	Stadium: Chonburi Stadium; Attendance: 3,115; Referee: Niwat Insa-ard; Assistant referees: Komsan Kampan, Suriya Lee-intr; Fourth official: Sahapop Sriboonlue

=== Semi-finals ===
The semi-finals would be featured by 4 clubs which were the winners of the quarter-finals, all were clubs from T1. This round had drawn on 5 April 2021.

7 April 2021	Bangkok United (T1)	1–2	Chiangrai United (T1)	Lak Si, Bangkok
19:00 (UTC+7)	Mika Chunuonsee 74'	Report; Highlight	Chaiyawat Buran 38'; Bill 86'	Stadium: Boonyachinda Stadium; Attendance: 1,132; Referee: Torphong Somsing; Assistant referees: Tanate Chuchuen, Chotrawee Tongduang; Fourth official: Songkran Bunmeekiart

7 April 2021	Chonburi (T1)	2–1	Buriram United (T1)	Khlong Luang, Pathum Thani
19:00 (UTC+7)	Worachit Kanitsribampen 25'; Junior Eldstål 59'	Report; Highlight	Supachok Sarachat 28'	Stadium: Thammasat Stadium; Attendance: 2,267; Referee: Sivakorn Pu-udom; Assistant referees: Apichit Nophuan, Poonsawat Samransuk; Fourth official: Mongkolchai Pechsri

=== Final ===
The final round would be featured by 2 clubs which were the winners of the semi-finals round, both were clubs from T1. This round was played on 11 April 2021 at Thammasat Stadium in Khlong Luang, Pathum Thani.

11 April 2021	Chiangrai United (T1)	1–1 (a.e.t.) (4–3 p)	Chonburi (T1)	Khlong Luang, Pathum Thani
18:00 (UTC+7)	Sivakorn Tiatrakul 40'	Report; Highlight; Full match Ceremony	Chatmongkol Rueangthanarot 30'	Stadium: Thammasat Stadium; Attendance: 0 Referee: Chaireang Ngam-som; Assistant referees: Pattarapong Kijsathit, Komsan Kampan; Fourth official: Songkran Bunmeekiart
	Penalties
	Akarawin Sawasdee (penalty scored); Phitiwat Sukjitthammakul (penalty scored); Wasan Homsan (penalty scored); Shinnaphat Leeaoh (penalty missed); Chotipat Poomkaew (penalty scored)		(penalty scored) Kritsada Kaman; (penalty missed) Eliandro; (penalty scored) Worachit Kanitsribampen; (penalty scored) Phanuphong Phonsa; (penalty missed) Kroekrit Thaweekarn

== Tournament statistics ==
=== Top goalscorers ===
Rank	Player	Club	Goals
1	(Brazil) Bill	Chiangrai United	8
1	(Brazil) Eliandro	Suphanburi (4 goals), Chonburi (4 goals)	8
3	(Thailand) Chananan Pombuppha	Bangkok United	4
3	(Thailand) Supachok Sarachat	Buriram United	4
3	(Brazil) Ailton	Muangkan United	4
3	(Ivory Coast) Bireme Diouf	Muangkan United	4
3	(Thailand) Natthawut Sukaram	Nonthaburi United S.Boonmeerit	4
3	(Thailand) Phatsaphon Choedvichit	Wat Bot City	4

=== Hat-tricks ===
Player	For	Against	Result	Date	Round
(Thailand) Supot Jodjam	Nongbua Pitchaya (T2)	Nam Phong United (T4)	6–0 (H)	30 September 2020	Qualification round
(Thailand) Phatsaphon Choedvichit	Wat Bot City (T3)	Siam (T3)	3–0 (H)	30 September 2020	Qualification round
(Thailand) Natthawut Sukaram^{4}	Nonthaburi United S.Boonmeerit (T3)	Nakhon Ratchasima Prokick United (T4)	8–1 (H)	30 September 2020	Qualification round
(Brazil) Ailton^{4}	Muangkan United (T3)	Nam Phong City (T4)	11–0 (H)	7 November 2020	First round
(Brazil) Willen	PT Prachuap (T1)	Khon Kaen Mordindang (T3)	7–0 (A)	7 November 2020	First round
(Thailand) Apiwat Ngaolamhin	Buriram United (T1)	Samut Songkhram (T3)	9–0 (H)	7 November 2020	First round
(Thailand) Muhammadnasay Kolae	Sukhothai (T1)	Surindra YMA (T4)	9–1 (H)	7 November 2020	First round
(Ivory Coast) Aboubacar Junior Diarra	Muang Loei United (T3)	Kranuan (T4)	5–0 (A)	8 November 2020	First round
(Thailand) Teeratep Winothai	Chonburi (T1)	Kalasin Sauropod (T4)	7–0 (A)	8 November 2020	First round
(Thailand) Poramet Arjvirai	SCG Muangthong United (T1)	Phatthananikhom City (T4)	10–0 (H)	8 November 2020	First round
(Thailand) Phumin Kaewta	SCG Muangthong United (T1)	Phatthananikhom City (T4)	10–0 (H)	8 November 2020	First round
(Brazil) Jonatan Ferreira Reis	Trat (T1)	Pluakdaeng United (T3)	5–2 (A)	6 December 2020	Second round
(Brazil) Bill	Chiangrai United (T1)	Muang Loei United (T3)	5–2 (A)	3 February 2021	Third round
(Brazil) Eliandro	Chonburi (T1)	Trat (T1)	5–1 (H)	3 April 2021	Quarter-finals

== See also ==
- 2020–21 Thai League 1
- 2020–21 Thai League 2
- 2020–21 Thai League 3
- 2020–21 Thai League 3 Northern Region
- 2020–21 Thai League 3 Northeastern Region
- 2020–21 Thai League 3 Eastern Region
- 2020–21 Thai League 3 Western Region
- 2020–21 Thai League 3 Southern Region
- 2020–21 Thai League 3 Bangkok Metropolitan Region
- 2020–21 Thai League 3 National Championship
- 2020 Thai League Cup
- 2020 Thailand Champions Cup
