= 2017 Thai League 4 Champions League =

Thai League 4 Champions League

The champions league round was the next stage from the regional stage of 2017 Thai League 4. Winners and runners-up of each region would qualified to this round to finding 5 clubs promoting to 2018 Thai League 3.

== Teams ==
League positions of the regional stage shown in parentheses.

Group stage
JL Chiangmai United (1st Northern); Sisaket United (1st Northeastern); Chanthaburi (1st Eastern); Satun United (1st Southern); North Bangkok University (1st Bangkok Metropolitan); Muangkan United (2nd Western) (Note: Suphanburi B was the winners of Western region but cannot promoted to champions lesgue round by the rule of FA Thailand about reserve team. So, the next place of Western region would promoted to champions league round.)	Mashare Chaiyaphum (2nd Northeastern); Marines Eureka (2nd Eastern); Samut Prakan (2nd Bangkok Metropolitan); BTU United (3rd Western) (Note: Suphanburi B was the winners of Western region but cannot promoted to champions lesgue round by the rule of FA Thailand about reserve team. So, the next place of Western region would promoted to champions league round.); Muang Loei United (3rd Northeastern)
Play-off round
Chiangrai City (2nd Northern)	Phuket (2nd Southern)

=== Stadium and locations ===
Locations of the 2017 Thai League 4 Champions League
Football clubs in Bangkok Metropolitan Region

13 clubs from all around Thailand would compete in the champions league round. 2 clubs Chiangrai City runners-up from Northern and Phuket runners-up from Southern regions must be play-off to finding one club joining last 12 clubs in group stage.

Team	Location	Stadium	Capacity
BTU United	Bangkok	Bangkokthonburi University Stadium	1,500
Chanthaburi	Chanthaburi	Chanthaburi Provincial Stadium	4,800
Chiangrai City	Chiangrai	Chiangrai Provincial Stadium	5,000
JL Chiangmai United	Chiangmai	Chiangmai Municipality Stadium	2,500
Marines Eureka	Rayong	Klaeng Municipality Stadium	1,000
Mashare Chaiyaphum	Chaiyaphum	Chaiyaphum Provincial Stadium	2,500
Muangkan United	Kanchanaburi	Kleeb Bua Stadium	13,000
Muang Loei United	Loei	Wang Saphung District Stadium	1,000
North Bangkok University	Pathum Thani	North Bangkok University Rangsit Campus Stadium	1,200
Phuket	Phuket	Surakul Stadium	15,000
Samut Prakan	Samut Prakan	Samut Prakarn SAT Stadium (Keha Bang Phli)	5,000
Satun United	Satun	Satun PAO. Stadium	5,000
Sisaket United	Sisaket	Sri Nakhon Lamduan Stadium	10,000

=== Sponsoring ===
Team	Kit manufacturer	Shirt sponsor
BTU United	Made by club	BTU United
Chanthaburi	FBT	Ban Laem Border Market
Chiangrai City	KAKA	Leo Beer
JL Chiangmai United	FBT	Moose Cider
Marines Eureka	Zealver Sport	Zealver Sport
Mashare Chaiyaphum	90 Minute	Mashare
Muangkan United	FBT	Chang
Muang Loei United	Made by club	Yamaha
North Bangkok University	Deffo	Thaisri Insurance Group
Phuket	Deffo	Royal Gems Pavilion
Samut Prakan	Sakka Sport	Phou Phieng Coffee
Satun United	Cadenza	SK ZIC
Sisaket United	Ari Football	Toyota Sisaket

=== Personnel ===
Note: Flags indicate national team as has been defined under FIFA eligibility rules. Players may hold more than one non-FIFA nationality.

Team	Manager	Head coach	Captain	Vice-captain
BTU United	(Thailand) Saichon Boonmeerit	(Thailand) Smath Amarttayakul	(Thailand) Sarawut Natasat	(Thailand) Seranee Pimpa
Chanthaburi	(Thailand) Sakchai Sawas	(Thailand) Athit Onkham	(Thailand) Mongkol Damdod	(Thailand) Panadol Leksuwan
Chiangrai City	(Brazil) Biasi Carlos	(Thailand) Nantawat Tansopa	(Thailand) Nantawat Tansopa	(Thailand) Pannapat Jakeeb
JL Chiangmai United	(Thailand) Wiwat Pongruengkiat	(Thailand) Apichart Mosika	(Paraguay) Anggello Machuca	(Thailand) Phichet Hawkongkaew
Marines Eureka	(Thailand) Wuttikrai Pundee	(Thailand) Nakin Thamsuwan	(Thailand) Chaiyut Baothumma	(Cameroon) Sandjo Jislin
Mashare Chaiyaphum	(Thailand) Siriwat Wettayawetin		(Ghana) Armah Abraham Ayaa	(Thailand) Worawut Termphan
Muangkan United	(Thailand) Prathet Boonyong	(Thailand) Chatree Korabandit	(Thailand) Apiwat Sompan	(Thailand) Anusorn Promprasit
Muang Loei United		(Thailand) Teerapol Thongdee	(Thailand) Kritsana Obma	(Thailand) Weerapong Boonkong
North Bangkok University		(Thailand) Damrongsak Boonmuang	(Thailand) Weerayut Jitkuntod	(Thailand) Sirichai Lamphuttha
Phuket	(Thailand) Thanustup Arjarnyut	(Thailand) Niwat Nuisangar	(Thailand) Jhanawat Arewansuk	(Thailand) Tevarit Junsom
Samut Prakan		(Thailand) Tanaboon Khanato	(Thailand) Issarathorn Punboonchoo	(Thailand) Manasak Jaiton
Satun United	(Thailand) Worasit Liangprasert	(Thailand) Tawatchai Thonghuad	(Thailand) Anan Ya-ngah	(Thailand) Safaree Nansen
Sisaket United	(Thailand) Ittikorn Thaninthornworakul	(Thailand) Suriyan Jamjaeng	(Thailand) Suebsakul Songbundit	(Thailand) Chatree Rattanawong

== Play-off round ==
Runners-up of Northern and Southern regions must be play-off to finding only 1 team qualifying to Thai League 4 champions league group stage. Because both regions have only 9 teams that less than all another regions.

Summary

Team 1	Score	Team 2
Chiangrai City	2–2 (a.e.t.) (3–0 p)	Phuket

Matches

16 September 2017
18:00 UTC+7

Chiangrai City	2–2 (a.e.t.)	Phuket
Nantawat Tansopa 102' (pen.); Maryson Jone dos Santos 105'	Report	Tevarit Junsom 92'; Nattapoom Maya 93'
Penalties
Chayanon Khamkan (penalty scored); Wisoot Boonpeng (penalty scored); Maryson Jone dos Santos (penalty missed); Verdini (penalty scored)	3–0	(penalty missed) Poowapat Netthip; (penalty missed) Tevarit Junsom; (penalty missed) Jhanawat Arewansuk

Nonthaburi Provincial Stadium, Nonthaburi
Attendance: 431
Referee: Terdsak Thongklam (Thailand)

== Group stage ==
The draw for the group stage was held on 12 September 2017, at the Sports Authority of Thailand (SAT) in Bangkok. The 12 teams were drawn to knock out stage, winners would advanced into two groups of three.

In each group, teams play against each other home-and-away in a round-robin format. The group winners, runners-up, and best third place promote to the 2018 Thai League 3.

=== First round ===
==== Knock out line A ====
Summary

Team 1	Agg.	Team 2	1st leg	2nd leg
Sisaket United	5–6	Chiangrai City	4–0	1–6
Mashare Chaiyaphum	3–4	Chanthaburi	3–2	0–2
Satun United	1–1 (6–7 p)	BTU United	0–1	1–0 (a.e.t.)

Matches

23 September 2017
18:00 UTC+7

Sisaket United	4–0	Chiangrai City
Phanuphong Aintachumpho 51'; Chatri Rattanawong 61', 68'; Rattasak Wiang-in 77'	Report

Sri Nakhon Lamduan Stadium, Sisaket
Attendance: 332
Referee: Rattapon Kongbunwas (Thailand)
1 October 2017
18:00 UTC+7

Chiangrai City	6–1	Sisaket United
Nantawat Tansopa 25'; Maryson Jone dos Santos 32', 49'; Eakkanit Punya 34'; Chayanon Khamkan 46'; Verdini 53'	Report	Chatri Rattanawong 48'

Chiangrai Provincial Stadium, Chiangrai
Attendance: 63
Referee: Pathompong Aiewcharoen (Thailand)

Chiangrai City won 6–5 on aggregate.

23 September 2017
16:00 UTC+7

Mashare Chaiyaphum	3–2	Chanthaburi
Watchara Ritkamlang 53'; Ittipol Pol-arj 61'; Kelvin Amdonsah 90+4'	Report	Tirawut Thiwato 6'; Saknarin Pinjaikul 41'

Chaiyaphum Provincial Stadium, Chaiyaphum
Attendance: 780
Referee: Pisit Bunthongpaeng (Thailand)
1 October 2017
18:00 UTC+7

Chanthaburi	2–0	Mashare Chaiyaphum
Nattawut Ngamthuan 26'; Nattapon Saiyasat 90'	Report

Chanthaburi Provincial Stadium, Chanthaburi
Attendance: 892
Referee: Jirawich Pornkaew (Thailand)

Chanthaburi won 4–3 on aggregate.

23 September 2017
16:00 UTC+7

Satun United	0–1	BTU United
	Report	Teerapat Laksameearunothai 69'

Satun PAO. Stadium, Satun
Attendance: 1,050
Referee: Manop Lempan (Thailand)
1 October 2017
18:00 UTC+7

BTU United	0–1 (a.e.t.)	Satun United
	Report	Nattawat Wongsri 28' (o.g.)
Penalties
Sitthinon Ketkaew (penalty scored); Nattawut Namthip (penalty scored); Sarawut Natasat (penalty scored); Wacharaphum Bunyaem (penalty scored); Poowasit Khamkhian (penalty scored); Bernard Kouassi (penalty scored); Thierry Ratsimbazafy (penalty scored)	7–6	(penalty scored) Sirawich Poothaworn; (penalty scored) Chamsuddeen Sohteng; (penalty scored) Abdulrosee Poohad; (penalty scored) Daiki Konomura; (penalty scored) Apichai Madwang; (penalty scored) Thirawat Lertpitchapatch; (penalty missed) Somnuek Kaew-arporn

Bangkokthonburi University Stadium, Bangkok
Attendance: 872
Referee: Teerachai Champa (Thailand)

1–1 on aggregate. BTU United won 7–6 on penalties.

==== Knock out line B ====
Summary

Team 1	Agg.	Team 2	1st leg	2nd leg
Samut Prakan	1–5	JL Chiangmai United	0–1	1–4
Muangkan United	2–1	Muang Loei United	2–0	0–1
Marines Eureka	2–2 (a)	North Bangkok University	1–0	1–2 (a.e.t.)

Matches

24 September 2017
16:00 UTC+7

Samut Prakan	0–1	JL Chiangmai United
	Report	Taku Ito 52'

Samut Prakarn SAT Stadium (Keha Bang Phli), Samut Prakan
Attendance: 653
Referee: Surapol Sawangjit (Thailand)
30 September 2017
18:00 UTC+7

JL Chiangmai United	4–1	Samut Prakan
Chatchai Nakvijit 43' (pen.); Pichet Hawkongkaew 45+3'; Taku Ito 55'; Kittipong Namsang 90+2' (pen.)	Report	Gabriel Mintah 13'

Chiangmai Municipality Stadium, Chiangmai
Attendance: 583
Referee: Peerasan Krataithong (Thailand)

JL Chiangmai United won 5–1 on aggregate.

24 September 2017
16:00 UTC+7

Muangkan United	2–0	Muang Loei United
Pornthep Klaywongpung 53'; Anuson Phamprasit 80'	Report

Kleeb Bua Stadium, Kanchanaburi
Attendance: 531
Referee: Chayanan Tuto (Thailand)
30 September 2017
16:00 UTC+7

Muang Loei United	1–0	Muangkan United
Chutchawal Nanteenpa 11'	Report

Wang Saphung District Stadium, Loei
Attendance: 667
Referee: Somkid Sarapim (Thailand)

Muangkan United won 2–1 on aggregate.

24 September 2017
16:00 UTC+7

Marines Eureka	1–0	North Bangkok University
Noppadon Tornchuay 84'	Report

Klaeng Municipality Stadium, Rayong
Attendance: 200
Referee: Worakrit Panyoo (Thailand)
30 September 2017
15:30 UTC+7

North Bangkok University	2–1 (a.e.t.)	Marines Eureka
Poomipat Kantanet 4'; Weerayut Jitkuntod 99'	Report	Nattakarn Kaewkong 119'

North Bangkok University Rangsit Campus Stadium, Pathum Thani
Attendance: 300
Referee: Jirayut Kasiphol (Thailand)

2–2 on aggregate. Marines Eureka won on away goals.

=== Final round ===
==== Group A ====
Pos	Team	Pld	W	D	L	GF	GA	GD	Pts	Qualification or relegation	BTU	CRC	CTB
1	BTU United (P)	2	2	0	0	8	3	+5	6	Promotion to the 2018 Thai League 3	—	4–2	—
2	Chiangrai City (P)	2	1	0	1	4	4	0	3	Promotion to the 2018 Thai League 3	—	—	2–0
3	Chanthaburi	2	0	0	2	1	6	−5	0		1–4	—	—

Updated to match(es) played on 22 October 2017. Source: Thai League 4
Rules for classification: 1) Points; 2) Overall goals difference; 3) Overall goals scored; 4) Fair play points; 5) Play-off without extra time;).
(P) Promoted
7 October 2017
18:00 UTC+7

Chiangrai City	2–0	Chanthaburi
Nantawat Tansopa 57'; Maryson Jone dos Santos 90+2'	Report

Chiangrai Provincial Stadium, Chiangrai
Attendance: 194
Referee: Thanawit Prompech (Thailand)

15 October 2017
18:00 UTC+7

Chanthaburi	1–4	BTU United
Tirawut Thiwato 63' (pen.)	Report	Diego Oliveira Silva 39'; Sitthinon Ketkaew 67'; Thierry Ratsimbazafy 80'; Nattawut Namthip 81'

Chanthaburi Provincial Stadium, Chanthaburi
Attendance: 913
Referee: Jirayut Kasiphol (Thailand)

22 October 2017
18:00 UTC+7

BTU United	4–2	Chiangrai City
Diego Oliveira Silva 30', 73', 79'; Sitthinon Ketkaew 65'	Report	Jetsada Supharit 82'; Maryson Jone dos Santos 90'

Bangkokthonburi University Stadium, Bangkok
Attendance: 385
Referee: Surapol Sawangjit (Thailand)

==== Group B ====
Pos	Team	Pld	W	D	L	GF	GA	GD	Pts	Qualification or relegation	JCU	MKU	MRE
1	JL Chiangmai United (P)	2	1	1	0	2	0	+2	4	Promotion to the 2018 Thai League 3	—	2–0	—
2	Muangkan United (P)	2	1	0	1	1	2	−1	3	Promotion to the 2018 Thai League 3	—	—	1–0
3	Marines Eureka (P)	2	0	1	1	0	1	−1	1	Promotion to the 2018 Thai League 3	0–0	—	—

Updated to match(es) played on 22 October 2017. Source: Thai League 4
Rules for classification: 1) Points; 2) Overall goals difference; 3) Overall goals scored; 4) Fair play points; 5) Play-off without extra time;).
(P) Promoted
8 October 2017
18:00 UTC+7

JL Chiangmai United	2–0 Awarded	Muangkan United
Chatchai Nakvijit 8'; Pichet Hawkongkaew 56'; Tangeni Shipahu 68'	Report

Chiangmai Municipality Stadium, Chiangmai
Attendance: 623
Referee: Supat Chai-ngam (Thailand)

The match JL Chiangmai United v Muangkan United, originally led 3–0 by JL Chiangmai United, was forfeited and awarded 2–0 to JL Chiangmai United by the FA Thailand on 10 October 2017, as Muangkan United's players had walked out during the match could continue playing after power failure has solved.

14 October 2017
16:00 UTC+7

Muangkan United	1–0	Marines Eureka
Kedi Amang Ghislain Roger 26'	Report

Kleeb Bua Stadium, Kanchanaburi
Attendance: 542
Referee: Jeerawich Pornkaew (Thailand)

22 October 2017
16:00 UTC+7

Marines Eureka	0–0	JL Chiangmai United
	Report

Klaeng Municipality Stadium, Rayong
Attendance: 205
Referee: Thapakorn Thongkon (Thailand)

=== Ranking of third-placed teams ===
The best third-placed team would promoted to 2018 Thai League 3.

Pos	Grp	Team	Pld	W	D	L	GF	GA	GD	Pts	Qualification or relegation
1	B	Marines Eureka	2	0	1	1	0	1	−1	1	Promotion to the 2018 Thai League 3
2	A	Chanthaburi	2	0	0	2	1	6	−5	0	

Updated to match(es) played on 22 October 2017. Source: Thai League 4
Rules for classification: 1) Points; 2) Overall goals difference; 3) Overall goals scored; 4) Fair play points; 5) Play-off without extra time;).

== Teams promoted to 2018 Thai League 3 ==
- BTU United (Group A winners)
- JL Chiangmai United (Group B winners)
- Chiangrai City (Group A runners-up)
- Muangkan United (Group B runners-up)
- Marines Eureka (Best third-placed)

== Goalscorers ==
5 goals

- (Brazil) Maryson Jone dos Santos (Chiangrai City)

4 goals

- (Brazil) Diego Oliveira Silva (BTU United)

3 goals

- (Thailand) Nantawat Tansopa (Chiangrai City)
- (Thailand) Chatri Rattanawong (Sisaket United)

2 goals

- (Thailand) Sitthinon Ketkaew (BTU United)
- (Thailand) Tirawut Thiwato (Chanthaburi)
- (Thailand) Chatchai Nakvijit (JL Chiangmai United)
- (Thailand) Pichet Hawkongkaew (JL Chiangmai United)
- (Japan) Taku Ito (JL Chiangmai United)

1 goal

- (Thailand) Nattawut Namthip (BTU United)
- (Thailand) Teerapat Laksameearunothai (BTU United)
- (Madagascar) Thierry Ratsimbazafy (BTU United)
- (Thailand) Nattapon Saiyasat (Chanthaburi)
- (Thailand) Nattawut Ngamthuan (Chanthaburi)
- (Thailand) Saknarin Pinjaikul (Chanthaburi)
- (Thailand) Chayanon Khamkan (Chiangrai City)
- (Thailand) Eakkanit Punya (Chiangrai City)
- (Thailand) Jetsada Supharit (Chiangrai City)
- (Brazil) Verdini (Chiangrai City)
- (Thailand) Kittipong Namsang (JL Chiangmai United)
- (Namibia) Tangeni Shipahu (JL Chiangmai United)
- (Thailand) Nattakarn Kaewkong (Marines Eureka)
- (Thailand) Noppadon Tornchuay (Marines Eureka)
- (Thailand) Ittipol Pol-arj (Mashare Chaiyaphum)
- (Ghana) Kelvin Amdonsah (Mashare Chaiyaphum)
- (Thailand) Watchara Ritkamlang (Mashare Chaiyaphum)
- (Thailand) Anuson Phamprasit (Muangkan United)
- (Cameroon) Kedi Amang Ghislain Roger (Muangkan United)
- (Thailand) Pornthep Klaywongpung (Muangkan United)
- (Thailand) Chutchawal Nanteenpa (Muang Loei United)
- (Thailand) Poomipat Kantanet (North Bangkok University)
- (Thailand) Weerayut Jitkuntod (North Bangkok University)
- (Thailand) Nattapoom Maya (Phuket)
- (Thailand) Tevarit Junsom (Phuket)
- (Ghana) Gabriel Mintah (Samut Prakan)
- (Thailand) Phanuphong Aintachumpho (Sisaket United)
- (Thailand) Rattasak Wiang-in (Sisaket United)

Own goal

- (Thailand) Nattawat Wongsri (BTU United against Satun United)

Source: thaileague.co.th
