= Samerpak Srinon =

Thai footballer (born 1991)

Personal information
- Full name: Samerpak Srinon
- Date of birth: 1 May 1991 (age 35)
- Place of birth: Thailand
- Height: 1.68 m (5 ft 6 in)
- Position: Left-back

Team information
- Current team: Kongkrailas United
- Number: 2

Youth career
- Sisaket Sport School

Senior career*
Years	Team	Apps	(Gls)
2011–2014	Bangkok		
2015–2016	Sukhothai	7	(0)
2017	Sisaket	4	(0)
2018	Kasetsart		
2019	Navy	6	(0)
2020–2021	Lampang	14	(0)
2022	Muangkan United	12	(0)
2022	Uthai Thani	10	(0)
2023	Krabi	27	(0)
2023–	Kongkrailas United	17	(1)
- * Club domestic league appearances and goals as of 26 February 2024

Samerpak Srinon (Thai: เสมอภาค ศรีนนท์) is a Thai professional footballer who is currently playing as a left-back for Thai League 3 club Kongkrailas United.
