= Nattakrit Thongnoppakun =

Thai footballer (born 1991)

Personal information
- Full name: Nattakrit Thongnoppakun
- Date of birth: 15 December 1991 (age 34)
- Place of birth: Thailand
- Position: Left-back

Team information
- Current team: Rasisalai United
- Number: 6

Senior career*
Years	Team	Apps	(Gls)
2014–2015	Bangkok United	1	(0)
2016	Air Force United		
2017	Udon Thani	7	(1)
2018–2019	Khonkaen	27	(0)
2020–2021	Muangkan United	12	(0)
2022	Rayong	12	(0)
2022–2023	Udon Thani	18	(0)
2024	Krabi	6	(0)
2024–	Rasisalai United	18	(0)
- * Club domestic league appearances and goals as of 30 April 2023

Nattakrit Thongnoppakun (Thai: ณัฐกฤต ทองนพคุณ, born December 15, 1991) is a Thai professional footballer who plays as a left-back for the Thai League 3 club Rasisalai United.
