= Bunyarit Prathomtas =

Thai footballer (born 1986)

Personal information
- Full name: Bunyarit Prathomtas
- Date of birth: 29 April 1986 (age 40)
- Place of birth: Nakhon Pathom, Thailand
- Height: 1.71 m (5 ft 7 1/2 in)
- Position: Midfielder

Team information
- Current team: Krabi
- Number: 75

Senior career*
Years	Team	Apps	(Gls)
2007–2017	Chula United		
2017	Army United		
2018–	Krabi		
- * Club domestic league appearances and goals as of 22 June 2008

Bunyarit Prathomtas (Thai บุญยฤทธิ์ ปฐมทัศน์) is a Thai footballer. He plays for Thai League 2 clubside Krabi.
