= Rachanon Kanyathong =

Thai footballer (born 1992)

Personal information
- Full name: Rachanon Kanyathong
- Date of birth: 3 January 1992 (age 34)
- Place of birth: Udon Thani, Thailand
- Height: 1.76 m (5 ft 9 1/2 in)
- Position: Right back

Youth career
- 2009–2011: Assumption College Sri Racha

Senior career*
Years	Team	Apps	(Gls)
2012–2015	Chonburi	8	(0)
2013–2014	→ Songkhla United (loan)	55	(0)
2015	→ Chainat Hornbill (loan)	9	(0)
2016–2017	PTT Rayong	37	(1)
2018–2019	Chiangrai United	0	(0)
2018	→ Chiangmai (loan)	19	(0)
2019	Samut Sakhon	9	(0)
2019	Rayong	4	(0)
2020	Lampang	1	(0)
2020–2021	Udon United	10	(0)
2021–2022	Muangkan United	27	(1)
2022–2024	Suphanburi	54	(0)
2024	Chanthaburi	1	(0)
- * Club domestic league appearances and goals as of 12 May 2024

Rachanon Kanyathong (Thai: รชานนท์ กันยาทอง) is a Thai professional footballer who plays as a defender.
