= Pol Chomchuen =

Thai footballer and coach (born 1959)

Personal information
- Full name: Pol Chomchuen
- Date of birth: 28 November 1959 (age 66)
- Place of birth: Thailand
- Height: 1.71 m (5 ft 7 in)
- Position: Midfielder

Senior career*
Years	Team	Apps	(Gls)
1978–1979	Raj-Vithi		
1980–1981	Osotspa		
1982	Raj-Vithi		
1983–1984	Army United		
1985–1988	Krung Thai Bank		

International career^{‡}
1979	Thailand U17		
1982–1984	Thailand B		

Managerial career
- 1989–2000: Krung Thai (assistance)
- 2001–2009: Thailand (assistance)
- 2011: Samut Songkhram
- 2012–2015: Muangthong United (assistance)
- 2014: Muangthong United (caretaker)
- 2016: Pattaya United (assistance)
- 2016–2017: Krabi
- * Club domestic league appearances and goals ‡ National team caps and goals as of June 28, 2008

Pol Chomchuen (Thai: พล ชมชื่น, born November 28, 1959) is a Thai football coach and former footballer.
