= Tatchanon Nakarawong =

Thai footballer

Personal information
- Full name: Tatchanon Nakarawong
- Date of birth: 18 November 1996 (age 29)
- Place of birth: Songkhla, Thailand
- Height: 1.77 m (5 ft 10 in)
- Position: Midfielder

Team information
- Current team: Chanthaburi
- Number: 88

Youth career
- 2011–2013: Suankularb Wittayalai School
- 2014–2015: Army United

Senior career*
Years	Team	Apps	(Gls)
2015–2016	Army United	18	(0)
2017–2018	Port	3	(0)
2017–2018	→ Chonburi (loan)	7	(0)
2018	→ Army United (loan)	16	(0)
2019	Trat	24	(0)
2020	Chiangrai United	0	(0)
2020–2021	Nakhon Ratchasima	22	(0)
2021	Muangkan United	13	(0)
2021–2022	Trat	16	(0)
2022–2023	Phrae United	48	(3)
2023–2024	Samut Prakan City	11	(0)
2024	Nakhon Pathom United	13	(1)
2025	Kasetsart	13	(0)
2025–	Chanthaburi	0	(0)
- * Club domestic league appearances and goals as of 26 April 2025

Tatchanon Nakarawong (Thai: ธัชนนท์ นคราวงศ์; born 18 November 1996) is a Thai professional footballer who plays as a midfielder for Chanthaburi in Thai League 2.

== Honours ==
=== Club ===
Chiangrai United

- Thailand Champions Cup (1): 2020
