= Jirattikan Vapilai =

Thai footballer (born 1997)

Personal information
- Full name: Jirattikan Vapilai
- Date of birth: 23 November 1997 (age 28)
- Place of birth: Phetchabun, Thailand
- Height: 1.75 m (5 ft 9 in)
- Position: Attacking midfielder

Team information
- Current team: Chanthaburi
- Number: 66

Youth career
- 2015–2017: Leicester City
- 2018: OH Leuven

Senior career*
Years	Team	Apps	(Gls)
2019	Port	2	(0)
2020–2021	MOF Customs United	7	(0)
2021	Sisaket United	6	(0)
2021–2022	Muangkan United	3	(0)
2022–2023	Customs Ladkrabang United	8	(0)
2024–2025	Lampang	22	(1)
2025	Sisaket United	0	(0)
2025–	Chanthaburi	0	(0)
- * Club domestic league appearances and goals as of 30 August 2025

Jirattikan Vapilai (Thai: จิรัฐติกาล วาพิลัย, born Nov 23, 1997) is a Thai professional footballer who plays as an attacking midfielder for Thai League 2 club Chanthaburi.

== Club career ==
=== Leicester City ===
In youth career he was trained for 2 years and a half at Leicester City in England.
