= Pongpat Liorungrueangkit =

Thai footballer (born 1996)

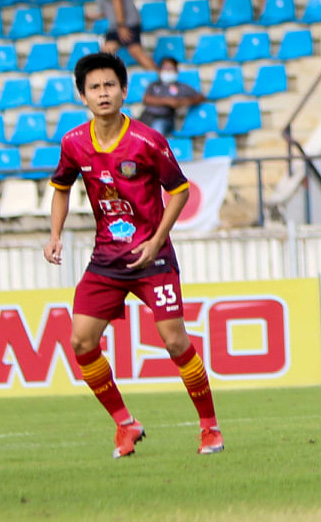

Personal information
- Full name: Pongpat Liorungrueangkit
- Date of birth: 4 October 1996 (age 30)
- Place of birth: Hua Hin, Prachuap Khiri Khan, Thailand
- Height: 1.60 m (5 ft 3 in)
- Position: Attacking midfielder

Team information
- Current team: Kanchanaburi Power
- Number: 18

Senior career*
Years	Team	Apps	(Gls)
2017	Hua Hin City		
2018	Nakhon Si United		
2019	Samut Sakhon	21	(6)
2019–2021	Sukhothai	6	(0)
2020	→ Chainat (loan)	8	(1)
2021	→ Kasetsart (loan)	13	(0)
2022	Muangkan United	29	(4)
2022–2023	Nakhon Pathom United	23	(2)
2023	Dragon Pathumwan Kanchanaburi	12	(1)
2024	Krabi	16	(0)
2024–	Kanchanaburi Power	47	(8)
- * Club domestic league appearances and goals as of 27 April 2026

Pongpat Liorungrueangkit (Thai: พงษ์พัฒน์ หลิวรุ่งเรืองกิจ; born 4 October 1996) is a Thai professional footballer who plays as an attacking midfielder for Thai League 2 club Kanchanaburi Power.

== Honour ==
Nakhon Pathom United

- Thai League 2: 2022–23
