= Prin Goonchorn =

Thai footballer

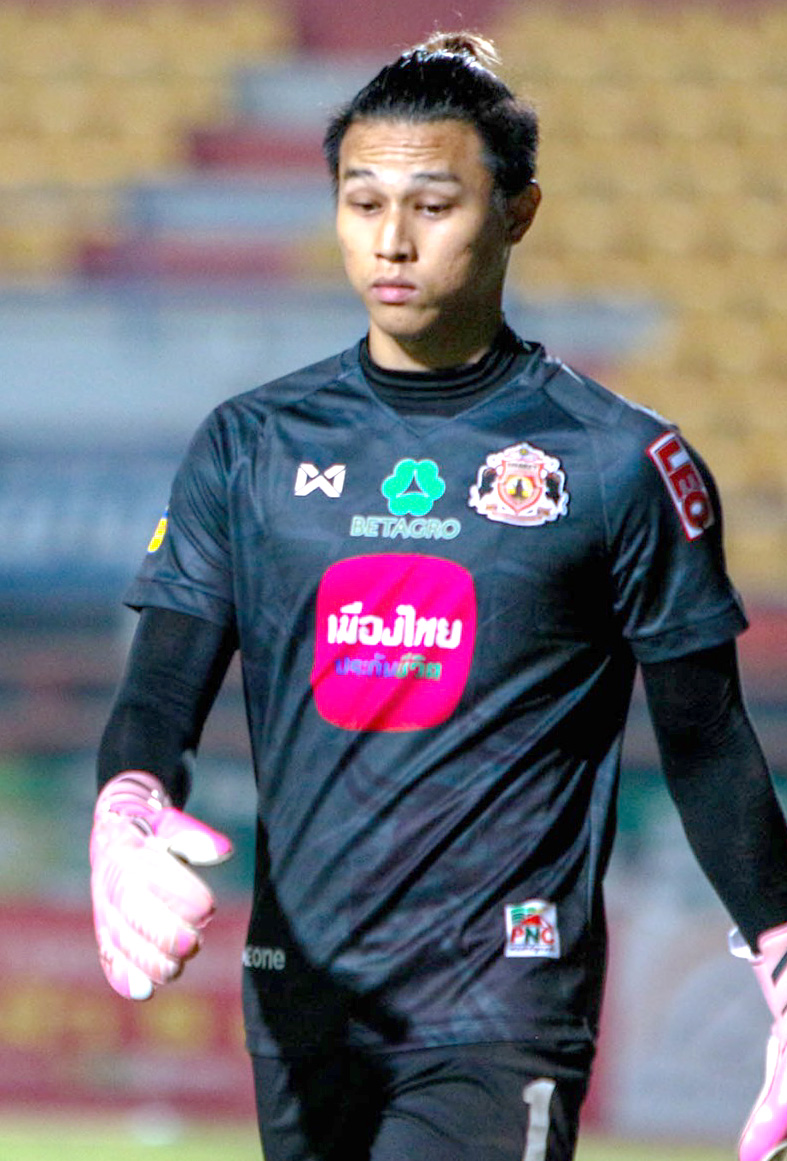
- Prin Goonchorn, in Thai League 2

Personal information
- Full name: Prin Goonchorn
- Date of birth: 21 July 1995 (age 31)
- Place of birth: Bangkok, Thailand
- Height: 1.79 m (5 ft 10 1/2 in)
- Position: Goalkeeper

Team information
- Current team: Kasetsart
- Number: 95

Youth career
- 2011–2012: Chiangmai

Senior career*
Years	Team	Apps	(Gls)
2013–2015	Phayao	30	(0)
2016–2017	Ratchaburi Mitr Phol	0	(0)
2017	→ JL Chiangmai United (loan)	20	(0)
2018–2019	Thai Honda	24	(0)
2020–2021	Sisaket	25	(0)
2021–2022	Muangkan United	23	(0)
2022–2025	Nongbua Pitchaya	14	(0)
2022–2023	→ Ayutthaya United (loan)	31	(1)
2024	→ Trat (loan)	1	(0)
2025–	Kasetsart	31	(0)

International career^{‡}
2017	Thailand U23	0	(0)
- * Club domestic league appearances and goals as of 30 April 2023 (UTC) ‡ National team caps and goals as of 9 June 2022 (UTC)

Prin Goonchorn (Thai: ปริญญ์ กุญชร; born July 21, 1995) is a Thai professional footballer who plays as a goalkeeper for Thai League 2 club Kasetsart. In 2023-2024 he played with Nongbua Pitchya again currently in 2025-2026 he plays with Kasetsart FC in Bangkok, Thailand capital team respectively.

== Early career ==
Prin was born in Bangkok, but grew up in Chiang Mai. He attended Wachirawit School, where he joined the school's football team. He twice represented Chiang Mai for the Prime Minister Cup. After graduating secondary school from Rajavinit Bangkae Pankhum School in Bangkok, he decided to pursue a professional football career and signed with Phayao F.C. in 2013, but spent two seasons as a second substitute goalkeeper.

== Club career ==
He began making appearances in 2015, and became Phayao's primary goalkeeper. His appearances earned him a contract with Ratchaburi Mitr Phol in the Thai League (T1), but again as a second substitute. He made only one appearance for the team, in the Thai League Cup, where the team faced an upset loss 0–2 to Chanthaburi. He transferred back to Phayao for the 2017 season, but was released before the end of the first leg due to the club's financial difficulties. He briefly returned to university studies before being invited to try out for the local Thai League 4 team currently Chiangmai United, with which he signed a six-month contract. Beginning again as a second substitute goalkeeper, he eventually became a starting player toward the end of the 2017 season, which saw JL Chiangmai promoted, as well as entering the semi-finals in the FA Cup (losing 0–3 to Bangkok United). He became the only T4 player to be called up for the U-23 National Team for the M-150 Cup. He has signed with Thai League 2 team Thai Honda F.C. for the 2018 season. In 2022, playing for Ayutthaya United on loan, he scored an amazing goal from long distance in the first match of the season, kicking a free kick and surprising Kasetsart F.C.'s goalkeeper.

Then in 2023-2024 played with Nongbua Pitchya FC again currently in 2025-2026 plays with Kasetsart FC with performed 31 appearances matches respectively.

In 2023-2024 He played with Nongbua Pitchya again, currently in 2025-2026 he plays with Kasetsart FC respectively with 31 performances matches in the field.
