= Somchai Makmool =

Thai football manager

Personal information
- Full name: Somchai Makmool
- Date of birth: 17 November 1980 (age 45)
- Place of birth: Thailand

Managerial career
- Years: Team
- 2014–2015: Sukhothai
- 2016: Songkhla United
- 2016–2017: Sukhothai
- 2018: Kasetsart
- 2018–2019: JL Chiangmai
- 2019: Phitsanulok
- 2019: Samut Sakhon
- 2020–2021: Lampang
- 2021: Khonkaen
- 2021–2022: Muangkan United
- 2022: Uthai Thani
- 2022–2023: Krabi
- 2023–2024: Khon Kaen
- 2024: Kanchanaburi Power
- 2024–2025: Trat
- 2026: Police Tero (assistant)

Somchai Makmool (Thai: สมชาย มากมูล; born 17 November 1980) is a Thai football manager He was most recently the assistant coach of Thai League 2 club Police Tero.

== Managerial statistics ==
As of match played 17 January 2025

Managerial record by team and tenure
Team	From	To	Record				
Team	From	To	P	W	D	L	Win %
Sukhothai	27 September 2016	10 March 2017	6	1	0	5	16.67
Kasetsart	10 January 2018	26 July 2018	3	1	0	2	33.33
JL Chiangmai	21 October 2018	21 April 2019	8	1	2	5	12.50
Lampang	21 November 2020	26 January 2021	5	2	0	3	40.00
Khonkaen	17 February 2021	10 July 2021	12	6	2	4	50.00
Muangkan United	19 October 2021	31 May 2022	26	13	7	6	50.00
Uthai Thani	11 June 2022	16 October 2022	10	3	4	3	30.00
Krabi	7 November 2022	10 July 2023	22	9	8	5	40.91
Kanchanaburi Power	12 February 2024	5 October 2024	23	8	7	8	34.78
Trat	10 October 2024	19 January 2025	12	3	3	6	25.00
Total			127	47	33	47	37.01

== Honours ==
Sukhothai

- Thai FA Cup: 2016 (shared)

Kanchanaburi Power

- Thai FA Cup runner-up: 2023–24
