= Patiphan Pinsermsootsri =

Thai footballer

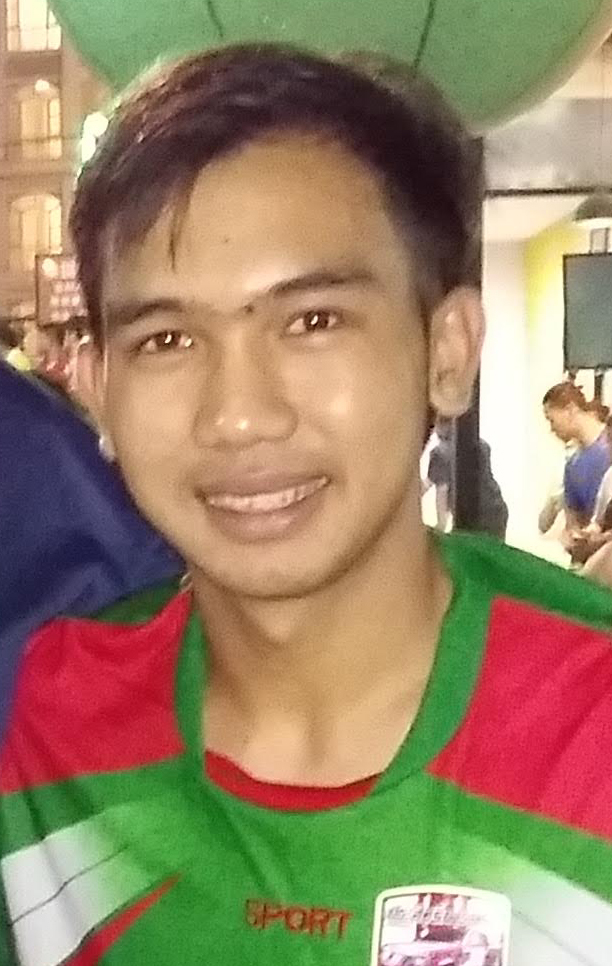

Personal information
- Full name: Patiphan Pinsermsootsri
- Date of birth: 3 October 1996 (age 30)
- Place of birth: Bangkok, Thailand
- Height: 1.62 m (5 ft 4 in)
- Positions: Winger; attacking midfielder

Team information
- Current team: Hua Hin City

Youth career
- 2011–2013: Assumption College Thonburi

Senior career*
Years	Team	Apps	(Gls)
2014–2017	Muangthong United	0	(0)
2015	→ Pattaya United (loan)	15	(4)
2015	→ Assumption United (loan)	16	(4)
2016	→ Pattaya United (loan)	1	(0)
2016	→ BEC Tero Sasana (loan)	2	(0)
2017	→ Nakhon Pathom United (loan)	21	(1)
2018–2019	Chonburi	0	(0)
2018	→ Trang (loan)	13	(2)
2019	→ Customs United (loan)	21	(3)
2020–2021	Muangkan United	35	(6)
2022	Pattaya Dolphins United	22	(2)
2023	Suphanburi	12	(0)
2023–2025	Samut Sakhon City	33	(3)
2025	Fleet		
2026–	Hua Hin City		

International career^{‡}
2013–2014	Thailand U19	8	(5)
- * Club domestic league appearances and goals as of 25 February 2024 ‡ National team caps and goals as of 24 October 2017 (UTC)

Patiphan Pinsermsootsri (Thai :ปฏิภาณ ปิ่นเสริมสูตรศรี; born 3 October 1996) is a Thai professional footballer who plays as a winger or attacking midfielder for Thai League 3 club Hua Hin City.
