= Supot Jodjam =

Thai footballer (born 1990)

Personal information
- Full name: Supot Jodjam
- Date of birth: 2 March 1990 (age 36)
- Place of birth: Kanchanaburi, Thailand
- Height: 1.77 m (5 ft 9 1/2 in)
- Position: Forward

Youth career
- 2004–2007: Srikranuan School
- 2008–2009: Bangkok Glass

Senior career*
Years	Team	Apps	(Gls)
2010–2012	Bangkok Glass	0	(0)
2011	→ Khon Kaen (loan)	12	(6)
2012–2014	Khon Kaen	51	(12)
2015	Nakhon Ratchasima	9	(0)
2015	→ BBCU (loan)	14	(2)
2016–2018	Krabi	42	(32)
2016	→ Surat Thani (loan)	22	(13)
2019–2020	PT Prachuap	17	(2)
2020	Nongbua Pitchaya	4	(0)
2020–2021	Police Tero	13	(0)
2021	Kasetsart	14	(1)
2022	Muangkan United	12	(4)
2022	Udon Thani	3	(1)
2023	Chanthaburi	13	(2)
Total		226	(75)

International career
2017–2018	Thailand	1	(0)
- * Club domestic league appearances and goals as of 21 May 2023

Supot Jodjam (Thai: สุพจน์ จดจำ), born March 2, 1990) is a Thai retired professional footballer who plays as a forward.

== International career ==
After the outstanding performance with Krabi in 2017 season. He received call-up for Thailand in a friendly match against Myanmar and Kenya. In March, 2018 he was in the squad of Thailand for 2018 King's Cup, but did not make an appearance.

=== International ===
As of 5 October 2017

National team	Year	Apps	Goals
Thailand	2017	1	0
Thailand	2018	0	0
Total		1	0

== Honours ==
=== Club ===
PT Prachuap FC

- Thai League Cup (1) : 2019
