= Chitpanya Tisud =

Thai footballer (born 1991)

Personal information
- Full name: Chitpanya Tisud
- Date of birth: 8 February 1991 (age 35)
- Place of birth: Bangkok, Thailand
- Height: 1.75 m (5 ft 9 in)
- Position: Attacking midfielder

Team information
- Current team: Nara United
- Number: 23

Senior career*
Years	Team	Apps	(Gls)
2013	Looktabfah	23	(9)
2014–2016	Chainat Hornbill	48	(10)
2016–2019	Buriram United	13	(1)
2017	→ Bangkok Glass (loan)	17	(3)
2018–2019	→ PT Prachuap (loan)	33	(7)
2020–2021	Ratchaburi Mitr Phol	16	(0)
2021	Muangkan United	15	(1)
2022	Uthai Thani	10	(2)
2022–2023	Nakhon Si United	25	(1)
2023–2024	Nakhon Pathom United	17	(0)
2024–2025	Sukhothai	19	(0)
2026–	Nara United	8	(0)
- * Club domestic league appearances and goals as of 14 June 2026

Chitpanya Tisud (Thai: จิตปัญญา ทิสุด, born 8 February 1991), simply known as Nhong (Thai: หน่อง), is a Thai professional footballer who plays as an attacking midfielder.

== Club career ==
=== Buriram United ===
June 2016, Chitpanya Tisud moved from Chainat Hornbill to Buriram United in the second leg of 2016 season.

== Honours ==
=== Club ===
PT Prachuap

- Thai League Cup (1) : 2019

Uthai Thani

- Thai League 3 (1): 2021–22
- Thai League 3 Northern Region (1): 2021–22
