= Yuttana Ruangsuksut =

Thai footballer

Personal information
- Full name: Yuttana Ruangsuksut
- Date of birth: 29 August 1989 (age 37)
- Place of birth: Surin, Thailand
- Height: 1.77 m (5 ft 9 1/2 in)
- Positions: Forward; winger

Youth career
- 2007–2008: North Bangkok University

Senior career*
Years	Team	Apps	(Gls)
2009–2012	North Bangkok University		
2013–2015	Nakhon Ratchasima	7	(0)
2016–2017	Sisaket	55	(6)
2018–2019	Khon Kaen	20	(2)
2020–2021	Muangkan United	11	(3)
2021–2022	Pattaya Dolphins United	21	(7)
2022	Kanjanapat	3	(2)
2023	Kasem Bundit University	9	(1)
2024	Dragon Pathumwan Kanchanaburi	5	(1)
- * Club domestic league appearances and goals as of 1 July 2024

Yuttana Ruangsuksut (Thai: ยุทธนา เรืองสุขสุด, born 29 August 1989), simply known as Ron (Thai: รอน), is a Thai professional footballer who plays as a forward.

== Honours ==
=== Club ===
Nakhon Ratchasima

- Thai League 2 (1): 2014
