= Chakrit Rawanprakone =

Thai footballer (born 1991)

Personal information
- Full name: Chakrit Rawanprakone
- Date of birth: 3 March 1991 (age 35)
- Place of birth: Buriram, Thailand
- Height: 1.71 m (5 ft 7 1/2 in)
- Position: Forward

Youth career
- 2005–2007: Suankularb Wittayalai School
- 2008: Muangthong United

Senior career*
Years	Team	Apps	(Gls)
2009–2010	Muangthong United	0	(0)
2010	→ Phuket (loan)	19	(4)
2011	Buriram	24	(5)
2012–2013	Ratchaburi Mitr Phol	17	(1)
2014	Nakhon Pathom United	18	(2)
2015	TTM FC	35	(11)
2016–2017	Nakhon Ratchasima	49	(7)
2017–2020	Port	7	(0)
2019	→ Customs United (loan)	23	(4)
2020–2021	Muangkan United	13	(5)
2021–2022	Khon Kaen	32	(7)
2022	Kasetsart	15	(2)
2023	DP Kanchanaburi	15	(2)
2024	Uttaradit Saksiam	8	(0)
- * Club domestic league appearances and goals as of 24 February 2024

Chakrit Rawanprakone (Thai: ชาคริต ระวันประโคน, born 3 March 1991) is a Thai professional footballer who plays as a forward.

== Honours ==
=== Club ===
Muangthong United

- Thai League 1 (1): 2009

Dragon Pathumwan Kanchanaburi

- Thai League 3 Western Region (1): 2022–23
