= Poomphat Sarapisitphat =

Thai footballer (born 1988)

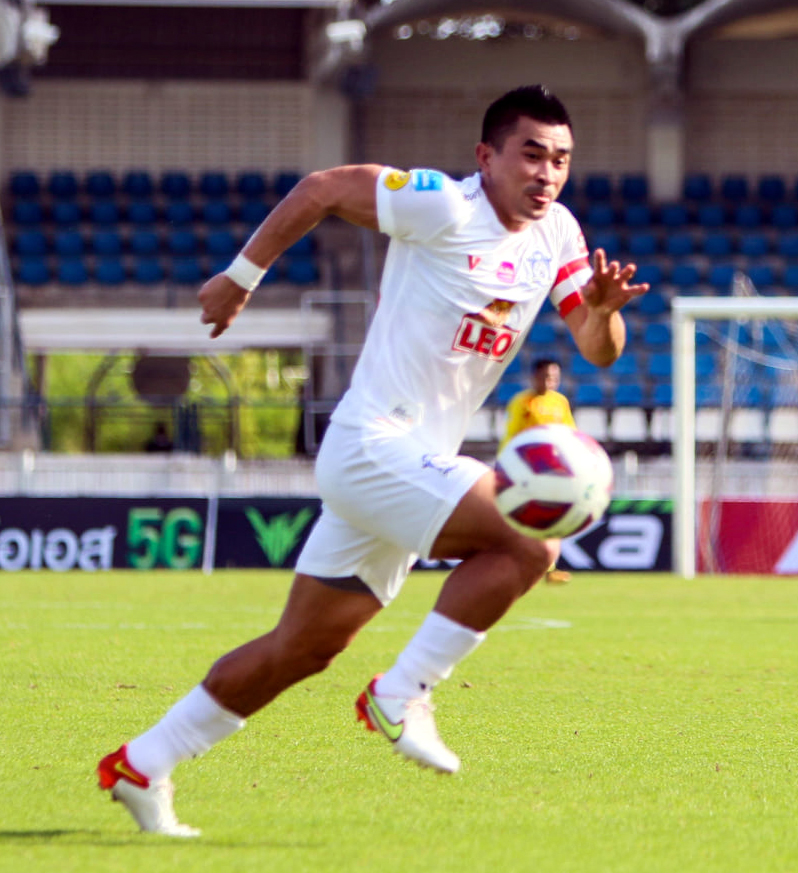

Personal information
- Full name: Poomphat Sarapisitphat
- Birth name: Meedech Sarayuthpisai
- Date of birth: 10 November 1988 (age 38)
- Place of birth: Songkhla, Thailand
- Position: Right-back

Team information
- Current team: Nara United
- Number: 26

Senior career*
Years	Team	Apps	(Gls)
2014	Bangkok		
2015–2016	BEC Tero Sasana		
2017–2019	Thai Honda	30	(0)
2020–2022	Chiangmai	56	(1)
2022–2024	Nakhon Si United	46	(1)
2024	Samut Prakan City	15	(0)
2025	Nakhon Si United	3	(0)
2025–	Nara United	15	(1)
- * Club domestic league appearances and goals as of 30 April 2026

Poomphat Sarapisitphat (Thai: ภูมิพัฒน์ สราพิสิทธิ์ภัทร), formerly Meedech Sarayuthpisai (Thai: มีเดช สรายุทธพิสัย) is a Thai professional footballer who plays for Nara United.

== Honours ==
=== Player ===
Nara United

- Thai League 3: 2025–26
- Thai League 3 Southern Region: 2025–26
