= Kanchanaburi Province Stadium =

Multi-use stadium in Thailand

Kanchanaburi Stadium
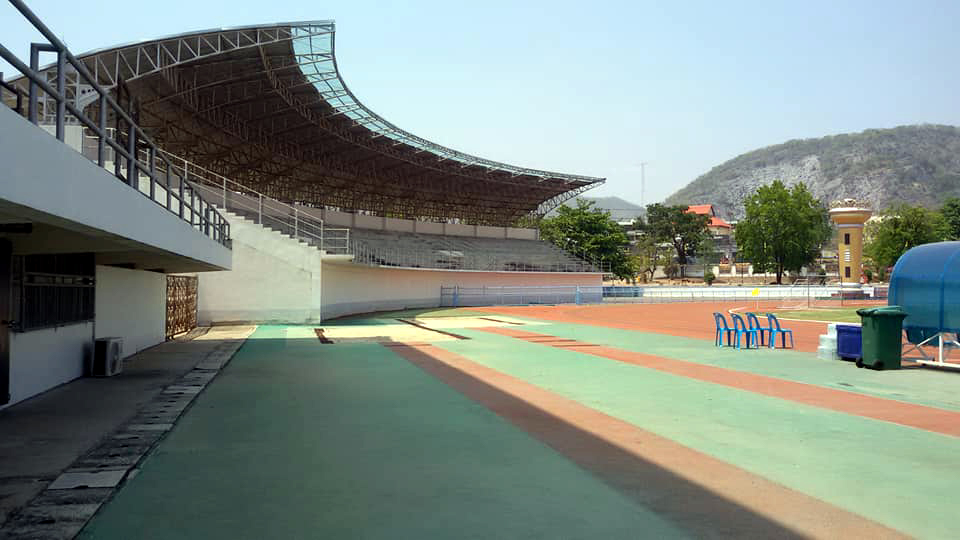
- Interactive map of Kanchanaburi Stadium
- Full name: Kanchanaburi Provincial Stadium
- Location: Mueang Kanchanaburi, Kanchanaburi, Thailand
- Coordinates: 14°02′59″N 99°30′10″E
- Capacity: 13,000
- Surface: Grass

Construction
- Expanded: 2008-2009
- Cost: US$3.5 million

Tenants
- TOT (2009); Muangkan United (2018–2022); Kanchanaburi Power F.C.

Kanchanaburi Stadium or Kleeb Bua Stadium (Thai: สนามกีฬาจังหวัดกาญจนบุรี หรือ สนามกลีบบัว) is a multi-use stadium in Kanchanaburi Province, Thailand. It was redeveloped for the 2009 Thailand National Youth Games and is also the former home stadium of the Thai Premier League's Kanchanaburi Power. The stadium hosted the 2025 King’s Cup

Prior to redevelopment, the stadium was a typical Thai municipal stadium: a pitch surrounded by running track with two small stands on each side. The old stands have been retained as part of the redevelopment, and four new stands have been constructed. At each end of the ground, there are two new stands, each curved as they follow the line of the running track. To the right of the main stand, the two new stands nearly meet in the middle but there is a small gap between them. To the left of the main stand are similar curved stands, but there is a larger gap in the middle. All four new stands have cantilever roofs.
