= Krabi F.C. =

Thai football club

Krabi กระบี่ เอฟซี
- Full name: Krabi Football Club สโมสรฟุตบอลจังหวัดกระบี่
- Nicknames: The Andaman Eagles (อินทรีอันดามัน); The Yellow Blue
- Short name: KRBFC
- Founded: 2009; 17 years ago
- Ground: Prabai Stadium; Krabi, Thailand
- Capacity: 8,000
- Owner(s): Krabi Football Club Co., Ltd.
- Chairman: Sarawut Treephan
- Head coach: Sarawut Treephan
- League: Thai League 3
- 2025–26: Thai League 3, 10th of 10 in the Southern region
- Website: https://web.facebook.com/KRABIFOOTBALLCLUB
Home colours	Away colours

Krabi Football Club (Thai: สโมสรฟุตบอลจังหวัดกระบี่) is a Thai professional football club based in Krabi province. The club is currently playing in the Thai League 3.

== Timeline ==
History of events of Krabi Football Club

Year	Important events
2009	The club is formed as Krabi Football Club, nicknamed The Andaman Eagles; Club admitted to the Regional League South Division; Home games to be played at Krabi Stadium; Nattiwat Raksakij named as the first ever coach of Krabi; Krabi finish their first campaign in 5th position in the 8 team southern league
2010	They finish 6th this time in the newly expanded 13 team league
2011	Krabi win the 2011 Thai Division 2 League Southern Region; The club are then promoted via the playoffs.
2012	Their first season in the first division ends with a respectable 6th-placed finish.

== Stadium and locations ==
Coordinates	Location	Stadium	Capacity	Year
8°06′30″N 98°55′00″E	Krabi	Krabi Provincial Stadium	3,590	2009–2010
8°06′41″N 98°55′13″E	Krabi	Institute of Physical Education Krabi Campus Stadium	?	2011
8°06′30″N 98°55′00″E	Krabi	Krabi Provincial Stadium	8,000	2011–2024
8°02′30″N 98°51′07″E	Krabi	Prabai Stadium	1,000	2025–

== Seasons ==
Season	League									FA Cup	League Cup	T3 Cup	Top scorer	
Season	Division	P	W	D	L	F	A	Pts	Pos	FA Cup	League Cup	T3 Cup	Name	Goals
2009	DIV 2 South	14	5	3	6	17	21	18	5th		—N/a			
2010	DIV 2 South	24	10	5	9	33	32	35	6th					
2011	DIV 2 South	24	14	7	3	37	22	49	1st					
2012	DIV 1	34	17	6	11	49	28	57	6th				(Brazil) Cristiano Lopes (Thailand) Ekkachai Nuikhao (Thailand) Thaweepong Jaroenrup	7
2013	DIV 1	34	11	8	15	44	49	41	9th	R2			(Cameroon) John Mary	10
2014	DIV 1	34	13	8	13	41	38	47	10th	R2			(Brazil) Erivaldo Oliveira	12
2015	DIV 1	38	12	13	13	46	47	49	14th	R4	R2		(Ivory Coast) Labi Kassiaty	10
2016	DIV 1	26	7	8	11	27	26	29	10th	R2	QF		(Namibia) Tangeni Shipahu	8
2017	T2	32	10	8	14	50	62	38	12th	QR	QRP		(Thailand) Supot Jodjam	23
2018	T2	28	7	5	16	26	49	26	14th	R3	R1		(Thailand) Supot Jodjam	9
2019	T3 Lower	26	10	6	10	34	29	36	7th	R2	Opted out		(Argentina) Nicolás Abot	8
2020–21	T3 South	17	10	5	2	43	17	35	2nd	R1	QR2		(Germany) George Kelbel	17
2021–22	T3 South	24	17	3	4	45	11	54	1st	Opted out	R2		(Thailand) Phuchakhen Chandaeng	15
2022–23	T2	34	10	12	12	46	46	42	12th	R2	QR		(Oman) Badar Ali	16
2023–24	T2	34	3	11	20	23	63	20	18th	Opted out	Opted out		(Thailand) Phuchakhen Chandaeng	5
2024–25	T3 South	22	6	4	12	25	32	22	9th	Opted out	Opted out	LP	(Egypt) Abdelrahman Seddik, (Thailand) Sirisak Promduang	4
2025–26	T3 South	18	0	1	17	1	52	1	10th	Opted out	QR2	Opted out	(Thailand) Worawut Sisahwat	1

Champions	Runners-up	Third place	Promoted	Relegated

- P = Played
- W = Games won
- D = Games drawn
- L = Games lost
- F = Goals for
- A = Goals against
- Pts = Points
- Pos = Final position
- TPL = Thai Premier League
- QR = Qualifying Round
- QR1 = First Qualifying Round
- QR2 = Second Qualifying Round
- QR3 = Third Qualifying Round
- QR4 = Fourth Qualifying Round
- QRP = Qualifying Play-off Round
- RInt = Intermediate Round
- R1 = Round 1
- R2 = Round 2
- R3 = Round 3
- R4 = Round 4
- R5 = Round 5
- R6 = Round 6
- GR = Group stage
- QF = Quarter-finals
- SF = Semi-finals
- RU = Runners-up
- S = Shared
- W = Winners

== Players ==
=== Current squad ===
As of 1 October 2024

Note: Flags indicate national team as defined under FIFA eligibility rules; some limited exceptions apply. Players may hold more than one non-FIFA nationality.

No.	Pos.	Nation	Player
1	GK	THA	Krittapas Yimlamai
2	DF	THA	Worawit Doungjit
3	DF	RUS	Alim Zumakulov
4	DF	THA	Chaithat Maneein
6	DF	THA	Thanayos Sophaphon
8	MF	THA	Akkavit Machamni
9	FW	EGY	Abdelrahman Khaled Elsayed Seddik
11	FW	THA	Phanthawat Hatdonla
14	DF	THA	Oatthaphon Chongrak
15	MF	THA	Raksit Duangthong
16	DF	THA	Suchat Chayyai
17	MF	THA	Tanakorn Thongta
18	MF	THA	Sirisak Promduang
19	GK	THA	Narakorn Khonraengdee
21	DF	THA	Poramet Silarak
22	MF	THA	Tharathep Jaksurang

No.	Pos.	Nation	Player
23	FW	THA	Chayaphon Phanwiset
24	MF	THA	Disadorn Phanchan
25	DF	THA	Methus Yutthanarong
26	MF	THA	Korrawit Sewikhan
27	MF	THA	Arthitriw Songsayorm
29	FW	THA	Nawapol Rodkeal
31	MF	THA	Narutchai Piwbunruang
33	DF	THA	Phuriphat Tongfuea
43	MF	THA	Khanatip Phonin
44	MF	THA	Adithep Wongraksa
55	DF	THA	Supachet Nilwong
56	MF	THA	Suepsak Sudsri
69	DF	THA	Yossapat Sakprom
70	FW	EGY	Ezzulddin Al-Bassam
77	FW	THA	Abib-Ali Sikder
98	FW	THA	Natthaphum Khithong

== Club officials ==
Position	Name
Chairman & Head coach	(Thailand) Sarawut Treephan
Assistant coach	(Thailand) Nattapong Kongsuk
Goalkeeping coach	(Thailand) Niwet Kaewsaeng

== Coaches ==
Coaches by Years (2014–present)

Dates	Name	Notes
January 2014 – March 2015	(Thailand) Chayaphon Kotchasarn	
March 2015 – December 2015	(Thailand) Vorawan Chitavanich	
January 2016 – May 2016	(Thailand) Wirat Keayiwa	
May 2016 – April 2017	(Thailand) Pol Chomchuen	
April 2017 – September 2017	(Thailand) Jetniphat Rachatachalermroj	
September 2017 – November 2017	(Thailand) Wirat Keayiwa	
December 2017 – April 2018	(Argentina) Daniel Blanco	
April 2018 – June 2018	(Thailand) Wirat Keayiwa	
June 2018 – December 2018	(Montenegro) Radoslav Batak	
December 2018 – June 2019	(Thailand) Thaweepong Jaroenrup	
June 2019 – December 2019	(Thailand) Ittiphol Pimvong	
January 2020 – November 2020	(Thailand) Amorn Piwdee	
November 2020 – September 2021	(Thailand) Nattapong Kongsuk	
September 2021 – November 2022	(Thailand) Prajak Weangsong	
November 2022 – July 2023	(Thailand) Somchai Makmool	
August 2023 – November 2023	(Thailand) Alongkorn Thongaum	
November 2023 – March 2024	(Thailand) Arnon Bandasak	
March – April 2024	(Thailand) Ittiphol Pimvong	
August 2024 –	(Thailand) Sarawut Treephan	

== Honours ==
=== Domestic leagues ===
- Thai League 3
  - Runners-up (1): 2021–22
- Thai League 3 Southern Region
  - Winners (1): 2021–22
- Regional League South Division
  - Winners (1): 2011
