= Muangkan United F.C. =

Thai football club

Muangkan United เมืองกาญจน์ ยูไนเต็ด
- Full name: Muangkan United Football Club สโมสรฟุบอลเมืองกาญจน์ ยูไนเต็ด
- Nicknames: The Great Bats (ค้างคาวมหากาฬ)
- Short name: MKUFC
- Founded: 2009, as Muangkan F.C. 2012, as Muangkan United
- Dissolved: 2022
- Ground: Kanchanaburi Province Stadium; Kanchanaburi, Thailand
- Capacity: 13,000
Home colours	Away colours

Muangkan United Football Club (Thai: สโมสรฟุตบอลเมืองกาญจน์ ยูไนเต็ด) is a Thai defunct football club based in Kanchanaburi Province.

== History ==
In 2009, Muangkan United Football Club was formed as Muangkan Football Club, nicknamed The Bats. Home games to be played at Kanchanaburi Province Stadium. In 2010 the club join the professional league that was 2010 Regional League Division 2 Central & Eastern Region.

In 2012, the club changed its name to Muangkan United Football Club due to a change of team owner and changed its nickname to The Greats Bats.

Muangkan United was dissolved in 2022 due to financial problem.

== Stadium and locations ==
Coordinates	Location	Stadium	Year
14°02′59″N 99°30′10″E	Kanchanaburi	Kanchanaburi Province Stadium	2010–2017, 2019–2022

== Season-by-season record ==
Season	League									FA Cup	League Cup
Season	Division	P	W	D	L	F	A	Pts	Pos	FA Cup	League Cup
2010	Central & East	30	13	11	6	44	27	50	7th		
2011	Central & East	30	9	7	14	30	40	34	10th		
2012	Central & East	34	10	8	16	30	42	38	11th		
2013	Central & West	24	10	7	7	33	28	37	5th		
2014	Central & West	26	13	9	4	31	16	48	3rd		
2015	Not Enter	–	–	–	–	–	–	–	–		
2016	West	22	6	4	12	18	35	22	10th	R1	QR1
2017	T4 West	27	17	5	5	40	21	56	2nd	QR	Not Enter
2018	T3 Upper	28	7	9	10	34	41	30	8th	Not Enter	Not Enter
2019	T3 Upper	24	4	11	9	24	35	23	10th	Not Enter	Not Enter
2020-21	T3 West	17	13	3	1	50	13	42	1st	QF	QR2
2021–22	T2	34	14	10	10	70	62	52	7th	R1	Qualification play-off

Champions	Runners-up	Promoted	Relegated

- P = Played
- W = Games won
- D = Games drawn
- L = Games lost
- F = Goals for
- A = Goals against
- Pts = Points
- Pos = Final position
- N/A = No answer

- QR1 = First Qualifying Round
- QR2 = Second Qualifying Round
- QR3 = Third Qualifying Round
- QR4 = Fourth Qualifying Round
- RInt = Intermediate Round
- R1 = Round 1
- R2 = Round 2
- R3 = Round 3
- R4 = Round 4
- R5 = Round 5
- R6 = Round 6
- GR = Group stage
- QF = Quarter-finals
- SF = Semi-finals
- RU = Runners-up
- W = Winners

== Honours ==
=== Domestic Leagues ===
- Thai League 3
  - Runners-up (1): 2020–21
- Thai League 3 Western Region
  - Winners (1): 2020–21
