= 2024–25 Nongbua Pitchaya F.C. season =

Nongbua Pitchaya
2024–25 season
- Chairman: Suthep Poomongkolsuriya
- Manager: (Thailand) Sukrit Yothee
- Stadium: Pitchaya Stadium, Nong Bua Lamphu, Thailand
- Thai League T1: 14th (relegated)
- Thai FA Cup: -
- Thai League Cup: -

The 2024–25 season is Nongbua Pitchaya's 15th season in existence and their first season back in the Thai League 1 since the 2022–23 season following their promotion from the Thai League 2 in the previous season. In this season, Nongbua Pitchaya competes in 3 competitions which consisted of the Thai League, FA Cup, and League Cup.

On June 25, 2024, Thai League announced the program for the upcoming 2024–25 Thai League 1 season. The season commenced on August 9, 2024, and will conclude on April 27, 2025.

== Squad ==
As of 15 August 2024

Squad No.	Name	Nationality	Date of birth (age)	Previous club
Goalkeepers
1	Suphakorn Poolphol	(Thailand)	25 September 2008 (age 17)	Youth team
15	Kittikun Jamsuwan (Captain)	(Thailand)	9 June 1984 (age 41)	(Thailand) Sukhothai
31	Prin Goonchorn	(Thailand)	21 July 1995 (age 30)	(Thailand) Muangkan United
83	Suchin Yen-arrom	(Thailand)	21 February 1991 (age 34)	(Thailand) Samut Sakhon City
-	Thanakit Auttharak	(Thailand)	17 March 2006 (age 19)	Youth team
Defenders
3	Teerapong Palachom	(Thailand)	22 November 1996 (age 29)	(Thailand) Lampang
17	Jakkrit Songma	(Thailand)	13 January 1996 (age 30)	(Thailand) Lampang
25	Adisak Waenlor	(Thailand)	7 February 1994 (age 32)	(Thailand) Lampang
26	Worawut Sataporn	(Thailand)	25 October 1997 (age 28)	(Thailand) Ayutthaya United
27	Wutthichai Marom	(Thailand)	24 August 1994 (age 31)	(Thailand) Lampang
29	Anukun Fomthaisong	(Thailand)	2 March 1997 (age 28)	(Thailand) Police Tero
46	Jorge Fellipe	(Brazil)	27 October 1988 (age 37)	(Thailand) Trat
54	Pattaraburin Jannawan	(Thailand)	5 July 2005 (age 20)	(Thailand) Udon United
82	Chaiyapruek Chirachin	(Thailand)	29 July 2000 (age 25)	(Thailand) Kanchanaburi Power
88	Adisak Hantes	(Thailand)	9 February 1992 (age 34)	(Thailand) Chiangmai
Midfielders
6	Wasan Samansin	(Thailand)	13 November 1992 (age 33)	(Thailand) Lampang
7	Norraseth Lukthong	(Thailand)	6 September 1994 (age 31)	(Thailand) Lampang
8	Park Jong-woo	(South Korea)	10 March 1989 (age 36)	(South Korea) Busan IPark
18	Anawin Jujeen	(Thailand)	13 March 1987 (age 38)	(Thailand) Dragon Pathumwan Kanchanaburi
20	Wichit Thanee	(Thailand)	31 March 1993 (age 32)	(Thailand) Lampang
22	Pattaratron Buransuk	(Thailand)	24 October 2007 (age 18)	Youth team
41	Panthakan Ajsomboon	(Thailand)		(Thailand) Udon Banjan United
69	Pakorn Seekaewnit	(Thailand)	26 July 2002 (age 23)	(Thailand) Lampang
Forwards
9	Abo Eisa	(Sudan)	5 January 1996 (age 30)	(England) Grimsby Town
10	Chawin Srichan	(Thailand)	29 February 1992 (age 33)	(Thailand) Lampang
11	Paulo Conrado	(Brazil)	18 July 1991 (age 34)	(Vietnam) Quang Nam
14	Thanawut Phochai	(Thailand)	2 December 2005 (age 20)	Youth team
16	Jakkrawut Songma	(Thailand)	13 January 1996 (age 30)	(Thailand) Lampang
23	Marcus Haber	(Canada)	11 January 1989 (age 37)	(Thailand) Chonburi
30	Weerayut Sriwichai	(Thailand)	1 March 1988 (age 37)	(Thailand) Lampang
77	Peeranan Buakai	(Thailand)	17 June 2005 (age 20)	(Thailand) Udon United
90	Natdanai Chuatlay	(Thailand)	17 May 2006 (age 19)	Youth team
95	Panupong Phukpharap	(Thailand)	9 October 2002 (age 23)	(Thailand) Udon United
99	Jardel Capistrano	(Brazil)	10 October 1989 (age 36)	(Thailand) Dragon Pathumwan Kanchanaburi
-	Thanakrit Jampalee	(Thailand)	20 March 2006 (age 19)	Youth team
Players loaned out / left during season

== Transfer ==
=== Pre-season transfer ===
==== In ====
Position	Player	Transferred from	Fee	Ref
DF	(South Korea) Yoo Young-jae	(South Korea) Pyeongtaek Citizen FC	Free	
MF	(South Korea) Park Jong-woo	(South Korea) Busan IPark	Free	
DF	(Brazil) Jorge Fellipe	(Thailand) Trat F.C.	Free	
DF	(Thailand) Anukun Fomthaisong	(Thailand) Police Tero F.C.	Free	
FW	(Sudan) Abo Eisa	(England) Grimsby Town F.C.	Free	
MF	(Thailand) Wasan Samansin	(Thailand) Lampang F.C.	Free	
MF	(Thailand) Norraseth Lukthong	(Thailand) Lampang F.C.	Free	
DF	(Thailand) Worawut Sataporn	(Thailand) Ayutthaya United F.C.	Free	
DF	(Thailand) Chaiyapruek Chirachin	(Thailand) Kanchanaburi Power F.C.	Free	
DF	(Thailand) Adisak Hantes	(Thailand) Chiangmai F.C.	Free	
GK	(Thailand) Suchin Yen-arrom	(Thailand) Samut Sakhon City F.C.	Free	
FW	(Brazil) Paulo Conrado	(Vietnam) Quang Nam FC	Free	
MF	(Thailand) Panthakan Ajsomboon	(Thailand) Udon Banjan United F.C.	Free	

==== Loan In ====
Position	Player	Loaned From	Fee	Ref
FW	(Canada) Marcus Haber	(Thailand) Chonburi F.C.	Season loan	

==== Out ====
Position	Player	Transferred To	Fee	Ref
FW	(Brazil) José Nilson	Unattached	End of contract	
DF	(Croatia) Aleksandar Kapisoda	Unattached	End of contract	
MF	(Japan) Kento Nagasaki	(Thailand) Nakhon Si United F.C.	Free	
FW	(Brazil) Júnior Batista	(Thailand) Lamphun Warriors F.C.	Free	
DF	(Thailand) Piyaphon Phanichakul	(Thailand) Chiangrai United F.C.	Free	
DF	(Thailand) Anisong Chareantham	(Thailand) Udon United F.C.	Free	
MF	(Thailand) Nuttawut Khamrin	(Thailand) Udon United F.C.	Free	
DF	(Thailand) Thanathip Paengwong	(Thailand) Udon United F.C.	Free	
MF	(Thailand) Narongkorn Buasri	(Thailand) Udon United F.C.	Free	
DF	(Thailand) Apisit Saenseekammuan	(Thailand) Lampang F.C.	Free	
DF	(Thailand) Kidsada Prissa	(Thailand) Lampang F.C.	Free	
DF	(South Korea) Yoo Young-jae	(Thailand) Chainat Hornbill F.C.	Free	

==== Loan Out ====
Position	Player	Loaned To	Fee	Ref

=== Mid-season transfer ===
==== In ====
Position	Player	Transferred from	Fee	Ref

==== Loan In ====
Position	Player	Loaned From	Fee	Ref

==== Out ====
Position	Player	Transferred To	Fee	Ref

==== Loan Out ====
Position	Player	Loaned To	Fee	Ref

== Competitions ==
=== Overview ===
Competition	First match	Last match	Starting round	Record							
Competition	First match	Last match	Starting round	Pld	W	D	L	GF	GA	GD	Win %
Thai League	10 August 2024	30 April 2025	Matchday 1	30	6	9	15	37	62	−25	20.00
FA Cup			First Round	0	0	0	0	0	0	+0	—
League Cup			First Round	0	0	0	0	0	0	+0	—
Total				30	6	9	15	37	62	−25	20.00

Last updated: 30 April 2025
Source: Competitions

=== Thai League 1 ===
==== League table ====
Pos	Team	Pld	W	D	L	GF	GA	GD	Pts	Qualification
12	Rayong	30	8	8	14	41	59	−18	32	
13	Nakhon Ratchasima	30	7	11	12	36	57	−21	32	
14	Nongbua Pitchaya (R)	30	6	9	15	37	62	−25	27	Relegation to Thai League 2
15	Nakhon Pathom United (R)	30	5	8	17	30	59	−29	23	Relegation to Thai League 2
16	Khonkaen United (R)	30	4	6	20	21	68	−47	18	Relegation to Thai League 2

Source: Thai League
Rules for classification: Season in progress: 1) Points; 2) Goal difference; 3) Goals scored; End of season: 1) Points; 2) Head-to-head points; 3) Head-to-head goal difference; 4) Goals scored.
(R) Relegated

==== Results summary ====
Overall								Home						Away					
Pld	W	D	L	GF	GA	GD	Pts	W	D	L	GF	GA	GD	W	D	L	GF	GA	GD
7	2	3	2	9	15	−6	9	2	1	1	5	7	−2	0	2	1	4	8	−4

==== Matches ====
Win Draw Loss

10 August 2024 1	Nongbua Pitchaya	0-4	Buriram United	Nong Bua Lamphu
	Kittikun (red card) 41'		Cools 10'; Crispim 61'; Bissoli 76'; Supachai 83'	Stadium: Pitchaya Stadium; Attendance: 5,955; Referee: Niwat Insa-ard

17 August 2024 2	PT Prachuap	4-0	Nongbua Pitchaya	Prachuap Khiri Khan
	Tauã 45'; Jeong 60' (pen.); Jiraphan 82'; Phanthamit 90+1'			Stadium: Sam Ao Stadium; Attendance: 2,850; Referee: Warintron Sassadee

24 August 2024 3	Nongbua Pitchaya	2-1	Nakhon Pathom United	Nong Bua Lamphu
	Conrado 15' 84'		Tatchanon 54'	Stadium: Pitchaya Stadium; Attendance: 2,191; Referee: Akom Charoensuk

27 August 2024 4	Lamphun Warriors	3-3	Nongbua Pitchaya	Lamphun
	Akarapong 7'; Jefferson 24'; Osman 60'		Fellipe 65'; Conrado 75'; Eisa 90+6'	Stadium: Lamphun Warriors Stadium; Attendance: 4,097; Referee: Satchukorn Saenchu

31 August 2024 5	Nongbua Pitchaya	0-0	Muangthong United	Nong Bua Lamphu
				Stadium: Pitchaya Stadium; Attendance: 4,375; Referee: Wiwat Jumpaoon

14 September 2024 6	BG Pathum United	1-1	Nongbua Pitchaya	Pathum Thani
	Teerasil 49'		Weerayut 70'	Stadium: BG Stadium; Attendance: 7,212; Referee: Songkran Bunmeekiart

21 September 2024 7	Nongbua Pitchaya	3-2	Uthai Thani	Nong Bua Lamphu
	Haber 23' 59' 61'		Agudelo 20'; Dias 41' (pen.)	Stadium: Pitchaya Stadium; Attendance: 2,015; Referee: Wiwat Jumpaoon

24 September 2024 8	Nakhon Ratchasima	v	Nongbua Pitchaya	Nakhon Ratchasima
				Stadium: 80th Birthday Stadium

28 September 2024 9	Nongbua Pitchaya	v	True Bangkok United	Nong Bua Lamphu
				Stadium: Pitchaya Stadium

5 October 2024 10	Rayong	v	Nongbua Pitchaya	Rayong
				Stadium: WHA Rayong Stadium

20 October 2024 11	Nongbua Pitchaya	v	Ratchaburi	Nong Bua Lamphu
				Stadium: Pitchaya Stadium

26 October 2024 12	Nongbua Pitchaya	v	Khonkaen United	Nong Bua Lamphu
				Stadium: Pitchaya Stadium

29 October 2024 13	Sukhothai	v	Nongbua Pitchaya	Sukhothai
				Stadium: Thung Thalay Luang Stadium

3 November 2024 14	Nongbua Pitchaya	v	Singha Chiangrai United	Nong Bua Lamphu
				Stadium: Pitchaya Stadium

10 November 2024 15	Port	v	Nongbua Pitchaya	Bangkok
				Stadium: PAT Stadium

=== Thai FA Cup ===
==== Matches ====
Win Draw Loss

=== Thai League Cup ===
==== Matches ====
Win Draw Loss

== Team statistics ==
=== Appearances and goals ===
As of 21 September 2024

No.	Pos.	Player	League		FA Cup		League Cup		Total	
No.	Pos.	Player	Apps.	Goals	Apps.	Goals	Apps.	Goals	Apps.	Goals
1	GK	(Thailand) Suphakorn Poolphol	0	0	0	0	0	0	0	0
3	DF	(Thailand) Teerapong Palachom	6	0	0	0	0	0	6	0
6	MF	(Thailand) Wasan Samansin	0	0	0	0	0	0	0	0
7	MF	(Thailand) Norraseth Lukthong	4	0	0	0	0	0	4	0
8	MF	(South Korea) Park Jong-woo	5	0	0	0	0	0	5	0
9	FW	(Sudan) Abo Eisa	7	1	0	0	0	0	7	1
10	FW	(Thailand) Chawin Srichan	6	0	0	0	0	0	6	0
11	FW	(Brazil) Paulo Conrado	7	3	0	0	0	0	7	3
14	FW	(Thailand) Thanawut Phochai	1	0	0	0	0	0	1	0
15	GK	(Thailand) Kittikun Jamsuwan	6	0	0	0	0	0	6	0
16	FW	(Thailand) Jakkrawut Songma	7	0	0	0	0	0	7	0
17	DF	(Thailand) Jakkrit Songma	5	0	0	0	0	0	5	0
18	MF	(Thailand) Anawin Jujeen	4	0	0	0	0	0	4	0
20	MF	(Thailand) Wichit Thanee	6	0	0	0	0	0	6	0
22	MF	(Thailand) Pattaratron Buransuk	2	0	0	0	0	0	2	0
23	FW	(Canada) Marcus Haber	6	3	0	0	0	0	6	3
25	DF	(Thailand) Adisak Waenlor	5	0	0	0	0	0	5	0
26	DF	(Thailand) Worawut Sataporn	2	0	0	0	0	0	2	0
27	DF	(Thailand) Wutthichai Marom	7	0	0	0	0	0	7	0
29	DF	(Thailand) Anukun Fomthaisong	0	0	0	0	0	0	0	0
30	FW	(Thailand) Weerayut Sriwichai	7	1	0	0	0	0	7	1
31	GK	(Thailand) Prin Goonchorn	2	0	0	0	0	0	2	0
41	MF	(Thailand) Panthakan Ajsomboon	0	0	0	0	0	0	0	0
46	DF	(Brazil) Jorge Fellipe	5	1	0	0	0	0	5	1
54	DF	(Thailand) Pattaraburin Jannawan	1	0	0	0	0	0	1	0
69	MF	(Thailand) Pakorn Seekaewnit	0	0	0	0	0	0	0	0
77	FW	(Thailand) Peeranan Buakai	0	0	0	0	0	0	0	0
82	DF	(Thailand) Chaiyapruek Chirachin	0	0	0	0	0	0	0	0
83	GK	(Thailand) Suchin Yen-arrom	0	0	0	0	0	0	0	0
88	DF	(Thailand) Adisak Hantes	3	0	0	0	0	0	3	0
90	FW	(Thailand) Natdanai Chuatlay	0	0	0	0	0	0	0	0
95	FW	(Thailand) Panupong Phukpharap	0	0	0	0	0	0	0	0
99	FW	(Brazil) Jardel Capistrano	3	0	0	0	0	0	3	0
	FW	(Thailand) Thanakrit Jampalee	0	0	0	0	0	0	0	0
	GK	(Thailand) Thanakit Auttharak	0	0	0	0	0	0	0	0
Players loaned out / left during season

== Overall summary ==
=== Season summary ===
Games played	7 (7 Thai League, 0 FA Cup, 0 League Cup)
Games won	2 (2 Thai League, 0 FA Cup, 0 League Cup)
Games drawn	3 (3 Thai League, 0 FA Cup, 0 League Cup)
Games lost	2 (2 Thai League, 0 FA Cup, 0 League Cup)
Goals scored	9 (9 Thai League, 0 FA Cup, 0 League Cup)
Goals conceded	15 (15 Thai League, 0 FA Cup, 0 League Cup)
Goal difference	-6
Clean sheets	1 (1 Thai League, 0 FA Cup, 0 League Cup)
Best result	3-2 vs Uthai Thani (21 Sep 24)
Worst result	0-4 (2 games)
Most appearances	
Top scorer	2 players (3)
Points	9
