= 2021–22 Thai League 2 =

Thai League 2
- Season: 2021–22
- Dates: 3 September 2021 — 28 May 2022
- Champions: Lamphun Warriors
- Promoted: Lamphun Warriors; Sukhothai; Lampang
- Relegated: Muangkan United; Khonkaen; Navy
- Matches: 306
- Goals: 869 (2.84 per match)
- Top goalscorer: Thales Lima (22 goals)
- Biggest home win: 6 goals difference Lampang 7–1 Khonkaen (5 March 2022)
- Biggest away win: 6 goals difference Customs Ladkrabang United 3–9 Udon Thani (17 November 2021); Chiangmai 0–6 Lampang (26 March 2022)
- Highest scoring: 12 goals difference Customs Ladkrabang United 3–9 Udon Thani (17 November 2021)
- Longest winning run: 8 matches Lamphun Warriors
- Longest unbeaten run: 21 matches Trat
- Longest winless run: 18 matches Navy
- Longest losing run: 8 matches Navy
- Highest attendance: 4,529; Lamphun Warriors 2–0 Rajpracha (24 April 2022)
- Lowest attendance: 0
- Total attendance: 162,177
- Average attendance: 634
- All statistics correct as of 30 April 2022.

The 2021–22 Thai League 2 is the 24th season of the Thai League 2, the second-tier professional league for Thailand's association football clubs, since its establishment in 1997, also known as M-150 Championship due to the sponsorship deal with M-150. A total of 18 teams will compete in the league. The season is scheduled to begin on 14 August 2021 and is scheduled to conclude on 22 May 2022.

For this season two teams in the final table (champion and runner up) directly promoted to Thai League 1 next season while teams ranked 3rd - 6th qualified in play off for last spot in top tier next season.

The 1st transfer window is from 4 May 2021 to 27 July 2021 while the 2nd transfer window is from 8 December 2021 to 4 January 2022.

== Team changes ==
The following teams have changed division since the 2020–21 season.

=== To Thai League 2 ===
Promoted from Thai League 3

- Lamphun Warriors
- Muangkan United
- Rajpracha

Relegated from Thai League 1

- Sukhothai
- Trat
- Rayong

=== From Thai League 2 ===
Promoted to Thai League 1

- Nongbua Pitchaya
- Chiangmai United
- Khonkaen United

Relegated to Thai League 3

- Samut Sakhon
- Sisaket
- Uthai Thani

=== Renamed Clubs ===
- MOF Customs United renamed to Customs Ladkrabang United

== Teams ==
Locations of the 2021–22 Thai League 2 teams
Football clubs in Bangkok Metropolitan Region

=== Stadium and locations ===
Team	Location	Stadium	Capacity
Ayutthaya United	Ayutthaya	Ayutthaya Provincial Stadium	6,000
Chainat Hornbill	Chainat	Khao Plong Stadium	8,625
Chiangmai	Chiang Mai	700th Anniversary Stadium	25,000
Customs Ladkrabang United	Samut Prakan	Customs Department Stadium, Ladkrabang 54	2,000
Kasetsart	Bangkok	Insee Chantarasatit Stadium	3,275
Khonkaen	Khon Kaen	Khonkaen PAO. Stadium	7,000
Lampang	Lampang	Lampang Provincial Stadium	5,500
Lamphun Warriors	Lamphun (Mueang)	Lamphun Provincial Stadium	3,000
Muangkan United	Kanchanaburi (Mueang)	Kanchanaburi Province Stadium	13,000
Nakhon Pathom United	Nakhon Pathom	Nakhon Pathom Municipality Sport School Stadium	6,000
Navy	Chonburi	Sattahip Navy Stadium	6,000
Phrae United	Phrae	Huai Ma Stadium	2,500
Rajpracha	Pathum Thani (Thanyaburi)	Leo Stadium	10,114
Ranong United	Ranong	Ranong Provincial Stadium	7,000
Rayong	Rayong	Rayong Provincial Stadium	7,500
Sukhothai	Sukhothai	Thung Thalay Luang Stadium	8,000
Trat	Trat	Trat Provincial Stadium	5,000
Udon Thani	Udon Thani	SAT Stadium Udon Thani	10,000

=== Personnel ===
Note: Flags indicate national team as has been defined under FIFA eligibility rules. Players may hold more than one non-FIFA nationality; Club dissolved during season would shown by grey background.

Team	Head coach	Captain	Kit	Sponsor
Ayutthaya United	(Thailand) Jetsada Jitsawad	(Thailand) Nonthawat Klinchampasri	Pegan Sport	Gulf, Chang
Chainat Hornbill	(Thailand) Sumeth Yooto	(Thailand) Anuwat Noicheunphan	Warrix	Wangkanai; AirAsia; Kubota
Chiangmai	(Thailand) Tanongsak Prajakkata (interim)	(Thailand) Poomphat Sarapisitphat	Volt	Leo; Bangkok Airways
Customs Ladkrabang United	(Thailand) Arnon Bundasak	(Thailand) Adisak Ganu	Volt	Nexx Point; Krungthai; GSB; Thai lottery Customs Department
Kasetsart	(Thailand) Itthipol Nonsiri (Thailand) Sarawut Janthapan (interim)	(Brazil) Célio Santos	Shoot	Tanowsri Traditional Chicken; Atlantic
Khonkaen	(Thailand) Pichet Suphomuang (interim)	(Thailand) Phattharaphon Gangsopa	Grand Sport	Leo; Muang Thai Insurance
Lampang	(Thailand) Sukrit Yothee	(Thailand) Wutthichai Marom	Made by club	Bangkok Airways
Lamphun Warrior	(Brazil) Wanderley Junior	(Thailand) Adul Lahsoh	Cadenza	Betagro; Chang
Muangkan United	(Thailand) Somchai Makmool	(Thailand) Suchao Nutnum	Hitman	Mittare Insurance
Nakhon Pathom United	(Thailand) Thongchai Sukkoki	(Thailand) Chokchai Chuchai	Made by club	Deedo; Chang
Navy	(Thailand) Narit Jitpoolphol	(Japan) Goshi Okubo	PB Design	Chang
Phrae United	(Thailand) Thongchai Rungreangles	(Thailand) Prakit Deeprom	Grand Sport	Phrae Sila; SAMART
Rajpracha	(Thailand) Amnaj Kaewkiew (Thailand) Supachai Komsilp	(Paraguay) Anggello Machuca	Warrix	Coca-Cola; Bangkok Glass
Ranong United	(Thailand) Natthawut Rattanaporn	(Thailand) Wattanachai Srathongjan	Eureka	Grand Andaman; PTG; Leo; Air Asia
Rayong	(Japan) Masami Taki	(Thailand) Adisak Srikampang	Warrix	Gulf
Sukhothai	(Germany) Dennis Amato	(Thailand) Sila Srikampang	Mawin	Chang; Carabao; CP
Trat	(Thailand) Somchai Chuayboonchum	(Thailand) Pornpreecha Jarunai	Shoot	CP; Chang
Udon Thani	(Thailand) Chalermwoot Sa-ngapol	(Croatia) Aleksandar Kapisoda	Kelme	Chang; Fitness First

=== Foreign Players ===
Players name in bold indicates the player was registered during the mid-season transfer window.

Club	Player 1	Player 2	Player 3	Asian Player	ASEAN Player 1	ASEAN Player 2	Former
Ayutthaya United	**(Afghanistan) Mustafa Azadzoy**	(Spain) Dennis Nieblas	**(Serbia) Nikola Komazec**	(Japan) Seiya Kojima			(Brazil) Felipe Wallace do Nascimento
Chainat Hornbill	(Brazil) Douglas	(Brazil) Wellington Priori	(Trinidad and Tobago) Daneil Cyrus	(Oman) Badar Al-Alawi			
Chiangmai	(Brazil) Danilo	(Serbia) Veljko Filipović	(Russia) Evgeni Kabaev	(Japan) Seiya Sugishita			
Customs Ladkrabang United	(Brazil) Elias	**(Brazil) Douglas Mineiro**		**(Iran) Abdolreza Zarei**			(Germany) Evangelos Skraparas (South Korea) Choi Ho-ju (Afghanistan) Moshtaq Ahmadi
Kasetsart	(Brazil) Célio	**(France) Simon Dia**	**(France) Greg Houla**	(South Korea) Park Hyun-woo	**(Laos) Soukaphone Vongchiengkham**		(Serbia) Nikola Komazec (Nigeria) Raphael Success
Khonkaen	**(Brazil) Carlos Damian dos Santos Puentes**	**(Brazil) Tiago Chulapa**					(Brazil) Fellipe Veloso (Serbia) Milan Bubalo (Japan) Koki Narita
Lampang	(Brazil) Andrey Coutinho	(Brazil) Deyvison Fernandes	**(Brazil) Lucas Massaro**	**(Japan) Yuki Bamba**			(Brazil) Marlon Da Dilva (Iraq) Selwan Al-Jaberi
Lamphun Warrior	**(Brazil) Thales Lima**	(France) Aly Cissokho	(Venezuela) Jeffrén Suárez	(South Korea) Kwon Dae-hee	(Myanmar) **Maung Maung Lwin**		(Brazil) João Paulo
Muangkan United	(Brazil) **Marlon Da Dilva**	(Brazil) Jonatan Reis		(Japan) **Kento Nagasaki**			(Philippines) Martin Steuble (Brazil) Caion (Uzbekistan) Artyom Filiposyan (Brazil) Leandro Assumpção
Nakhon Pathom United	(Brazil) Neto Santos	(Brazil) **Alberto Moreira Gouvea**	(Liberia) **Keith Nah**	(Iran) Amirali Chegini	(Laos) Phithack Kongmathilath		(El Salvador) Mark Lester Blanco (Japan) Kenzo Nambu
Navy	(Japan) Tatsuya Sakai	(Nigeria) **Adefolarin Durosinmi**		(Japan) Goshi Okubo	(Myanmar) **Suan Lam Mang**	(Timor-Leste) **Pedro Henrique**	(Brazil) Rosalvo (Japan) Yuki Bamba
Phrae United	(Brazil) Carlos Santos	(Brazil) Wellington Adão	(Brazil) Rodrigo Maranhão	(Japan) Taku Ito			(Myanmar) Kyaw Ko Ko
Rajpracha	(Brazil) Jardel Capistrano	(Paraguay) Anggello Machuca	**(South Korea) Choi Ho-ju**	**(South Korea) Yeon Gi-sung**			(Brazil) Douglas Mineiro (Japan) Yuki Nohara
Ranong United	(Cameroon) Frank Touko Nzola	(Japan) **Mitsuhiro Seki**		(Iran) Saeid Chahjouei	(Myanmar) **Aung Kyaw Naing**		(Brazil) Carlos Damian dos Santos Puentes (South Korea) Yeon Gi-sung
Rayong	(Brazil) Adalgisio Pitbull	(Brazil) Ramon Mesquita	(Spain) David Cuerva	**(Japan) Kenzo Nambu**	**(Myanmar) Kyaw Ko Ko**		
Sukhothai	**(Netherlands) Melvin de Leeuw**	(Sweden) Osman Sow	(South Korea) Hwang Do-Yeon	(South Korea) Jeong Woo-geun	**(Philippines) Marco Casambre**	**(Malaysia) Liridon Krasniqi**	(Argentina) Nicolas Velez (Singapore) Zulfahmi Arifin
Trat	(Brazil) Paulo Conrado	(Brazil) Valdo	(Ivory Coast) Marc Landry Babo	(Japan) **Hiromichi Katano**	(Myanmar) Zaw Min Tun		
Udon Thani	(Croatia) Aleksandar Kapisoda	**(Germany) Evangelos Skraparas**	(Germany) Arnold Suew	(South Korea) Lim Chang-gyoon	**(Myanmar) Aung Kaung Mann**		(Brazil) Thales Lima (Laos) Soukaphone Vongchiengkham

== League table ==
=== Standings ===
Pos	Team	Pld	W	D	L	GF	GA	GD	Pts	Qualification or relegation
1	Lamphun Warriors (C, P)	34	22	8	4	66	30	+36	74	Promotion to 2022–23 Thai League 1
2	Sukhothai (P)	34	22	7	5	78	44	+34	73	Promotion to 2022–23 Thai League 1
3	Trat	34	20	8	6	55	33	+22	68	Qualification for promotion play-offs
4	Lampang (O, P)	34	15	12	7	67	38	+29	57 (Note: The head-to-head record was a tie, Lampang ahead on overall goals difference.)	Qualification for promotion play-offs
5	Chainat Hornbill	34	15	12	7	58	46	+12	57	Qualification for promotion play-offs
6	Phrae United	34	14	12	8	51	35	+16	54	Qualification for promotion play-offs
7	Muangkan United (R)	34	14	10	10	70	62	+8	52	Relegation to 2023 Thailand Amateur League (Note: Muangkan United administratively relegated to 2023 Thailand Amateur League by FA Thailand decision because of the failure about club licensing.)
8	Udon Thani	34	13	8	13	53	58	−5	47	
9	Rayong	34	13	7	14	45	41	+4	46	
10	Nakhon Pathom United	34	10	12	12	42	47	−5	42	
11	Ayutthaya United	34	10	11	13	40	50	−10	41 (Note: Ayutthaya United ahead on head-to-head points record; Ayutthaya United 4 pts, Ranong United 1 pt.)	
12	Ranong United	34	10	11	13	35	45	−10	41	
13	Kasetsart	34	9	12	13	32	47	−15	39	
14	Chiangmai	34	10	8	16	39	55	−16	38	
15	Customs Ladkrabang United	34	9	8	17	44	63	−19	35	
16	Rajpracha	34	7	12	15	34	44	−10	33	
17	Khon Kaen (R)	34	5	9	20	32	60	−28	24	Relegation to 2022–23 Thai League 3
18	Navy (R)	34	2	5	27	28	71	−43	11	Relegation to 2022–23 Thai League 3

Source: Thai League
Rules for classification: 1) Points; 2) Head-to-head points; 3) Head-to-head goal difference; 4) Head-to-head goal scored; 5) Overall goal difference; 6) Overall goal scored; 7) Fair play points; 8) Play-off without extra time).
(C) Champions; (O) Play-off winners; (P) Promoted; (R) Relegated

=== Promotion play-offs ===
Semi-finals
5	Chainat Hornbill	1	0	1
4	Lampang	2	2	4
6	Phrae United	1	0	1
3	Trat	1	1	2

Finals
Lampang (a)	2	3	5
Trat	2	3	5

==== Semi-finals ====
8 May 2022
19:00 UTC+7

Chainat Hornbill	1–2	Lampang
Pharanyu Uppala 73'	Report; Highlight	Chawin Thirawatsri 19', 45+2'

Khao Plong Stadium,
Mueang, Chainat
Attendance: 1,613
Referee: Torphong Somsing (Thailand)
14 May 2022
18:00 UTC+7

Lampang	2–0	Chainat Hornbill
Kritsana Kasemkulvilai 3'; Weerayut Srivichai 49'	Report; Highlight

Lampang Provincial Stadium,
Mueang, Lampang
Attendance: 1,215
Referee: Warintron Sassadee (Thailand)

Lampang won 4–1 on aggregate.

8 May 2022
18:00 UTC+7

Phrae United	1–1	Trat
Arsan Pengbanrai 12'	Report; Highlight	Valdo 68'

Huai Ma Stadium,
Mueang, Phrae
Attendance: 1,097
Referee: Sivakorn Pu-udom (Thailand)
14 May 2022
18:00 UTC+7

Trat	1–0	Phrae United
Pornpreecha Jarunai 48'	Report; Highlight

Trat Provincial Stadium,
Mueang, Trat
Attendance: 1,595
Referee: Wiwat Jumpaoon (Thailand)

Trat won 2–1 on aggregate.

==== Finals ====
21 May 2022
18:00 UTC+7

Lampang	2–2	Trat
Chawin Thirawatsri 54'; Amorntep Nilnoy 80' (o.g.)	Report; Highlight	Reungyos Janchaichit 20'; Conrado 51'

Lampang Provincial Stadium,
Mueang, Lampang
Attendance: 1,114
Referee: Mongkolchai Pechsri (Thailand)
28 May 2022
18:00 UTC+7

Trat	3–3	Lampang
Valdo 2'; Conrado 32'; Isariya Marom 45'	Report; Highlight	Lucas Massaro Garcia Gama 15' (pen.); Andrey Coutinho 48'; Weerayut Srivichai 87'

Trat Provincial Stadium,
Mueang, Trat
Attendance: 1,715
Referee: Songkran Bunmeekiart (Thailand)

5–5 on aggregate. Lampang won on away goals.

=== Positions by round ===
The table lists the positions of teams after each week of matches. In order to preserve chronological evolvements, any postponed matches are not included in the round at which they were originally scheduled, but added to the full round they were played immediately afterwards. For example, if a match is scheduled for matchday 13, but then postponed and played between days 16 and 17, it will be added to the standings for day 16.

Team ╲ Round	1	2	3	4	5	6	7	8	9	10	11	12	13	14	15	16	17	18	19	20	21	22	23	24	25	26	27	28	29	30	31	32	33	34
Lamphun Warriors	6	6	4	7	9	11	8	5	5	6	6	6	6	5	5	4	4	4	3	3	3	3	3	3	2	3	3	2	1	1	1	1	1	1
Sukhothai	1	1	5	3	3	3	3	3	3	2	2	2	2	2	3	2	2	2	2	2	2	2	2	2	3	2	2	3	2	2	2	2	2	2
Trat	4	2	1	2	1	1	1	1	1	1	1	1	1	1	1	1	1	1	1	1	1	1	1	1	1	1	1	1	3	3	3	3	3	3
Lampang	9	11	6	4	5	7	9	6	6	4	5	5	4	4	4	6	5	6	5	4	5	4	4	4	4	4	4	5	5	4	4	5	5	4
Chainat Hornbill	11	14	16	11	12	6	5	9	7	7	7	7	7	6	6	5	6	5	6	6	6	5	5	5	5	5	5	4	4	5	5	4	4	5
Phrae United	2	4	2	1	2	2	2	2	2	3	3	4	5	7	7	7	7	7	9	8	8	8	8	8	8	8	8	7	7	7	7	6	7	6
Muangkan United	10	12	9	13	13	16	16	17	17	17	17	14	14	16	14	11	10	8	7	7	7	7	7	7	7	6	6	6	6	6	6	7	6	7
Udon Thani	8	10	8	6	4	4	4	4	4	5	4	3	3	3	2	3	3	3	4	5	4	6	6	6	6	7	7	8	8	8	8	8	8	8
Rayong	13	7	11	14	15	13	10	11	10	8	8	9	9	10	12	9	13	13	10	11	10	9	9	9	9	9	9	9	9	9	10	9	9	9
Nakhon Pathom United	16	15	14	10	11	10	13	14	13	14	14	15	16	14	15	16	15	15	15	15	14	13	14	13	11	10	10	10	12	11	9	10	10	10
Ayutthaya United	18	9	12	16	16	17	17	15	16	13	13	12	12	9	9	10	9	12	13	12	12	12	12	10	10	11	12	11	13	12	12	11	11	11
Ranong United	7	13	13	9	7	8	11	10	11	11	9	8	8	8	8	8	8	9	11	10	11	10	11	12	13	13	11	13	10	13	13	13	13	12
Kasetsart	14	8	10	12	10	12	12	12	14	12	12	11	11	12	11	13	12	11	12	13	13	14	13	14	14	14	13	12	11	10	11	12	12	13
Chiangmai	5	3	3	5	6	9	7	7	9	10	11	13	13	13	13	12	11	10	8	9	9	11	10	11	12	12	14	14	14	14	14	14	14	14
Customs Ladkrabang United	3	5	7	8	8	5	6	8	8	9	10	10	10	11	10	14	14	14	14	14	15	15	15	15	15	16	15	16	15	15	15	15	15	15
Rajpracha	12	16	15	15	14	14	14	16	15	16	15	17	15	17	17	17	17	16	16	16	16	16	16	16	16	15	16	15	16	16	16	16	16	16
Khon Kaen	15	17	17	17	17	15	15	13	12	15	16	16	17	15	16	15	16	17	17	17	17	17	17	17	17	17	17	17	17	17	17	17	17	17
Navy	17	18	18	18	18	18	18	18	18	18	18	18	18	18	18	18	18	18	18	18	18	18	18	18	18	18	18	18	18	18	18	18	18	18

Source: Thai League
= Leader and promotion to 2022–23 Thai League 1; = Promotion to 2022–23 Thai League 1; = Qualification for promotion play-offs; = Relegation to 2022–23 Thai League 3

=== Results by round ===
Team ╲ Round	1	2	3	4	5	6	7	8	9	10	11	12	13	14	15	16	17	18	19	20	21	22	23	24	25	26	27	28	29	30	31	32	33	34
Lamphun Warriors	W	D	W	L	L	L	W	W	W	D	D	D	D	W	D	W	W	W	W	D	W	W	W	D	W	L	W	W	W	W	W	W	W	W
Sukhothai	W	W	L	W	D	W	D	D	W	W	D	W	L	W	W	D	W	W	D	D	W	W	W	L	L	W	W	L	W	W	W	W	W	W
Trat	W	W	W	D	W	W	W	W	W	W	W	D	W	W	D	D	W	W	D	W	D	L	W	D	L	W	L	L	L	W	L	W	W	D
Lampang	D	D	W	W	L	D	W	W	W	D	D	W	D	D	D	L	W	D	D	W	L	W	W	W	D	W	L	L	W	W	D	L	L	W
Chainat Hornbill	D	L	L	W	D	W	W	L	W	W	L	L	W	W	D	W	D	W	D	L	D	W	D	D	W	D	W	W	W	D	D	W	D	L
Phrae United	W	D	W	W	W	D	W	W	L	D	L	D	L	D	D	L	L	L	D	W	D	D	W	D	W	W	L	W	L	D	W	W	D	W
Muangkan United	D	L	W	L	L	L	L	D	D	D	W	D	L	W	D	W	W	W	W	W	D	W	L	W	D	W	W	L	W	D	D	L	W	L
Udon Thani	D	D	W	W	D	W	L	W	W	L	W	D	W	W	W	L	W	L	L	L	D	L	L	W	W	L	D	L	L	D	W	L	D	L
Rayong	L	W	L	L	W	W	L	D	W	W	L	L	L	L	W	D	L	L	W	L	W	W	D	D	W	W	D	L	D	L	L	W	D	W
Nakhon Pathom United	L	D	D	W	D	D	L	L	D	L	D	L	L	W	L	L	W	D	L	W	W	D	D	W	W	W	L	W	L	D	W	L	D	D
Ayutthaya United	L	W	L	L	L	D	L	W	L	W	L	W	D	W	D	D	W	L	L	D	D	D	W	W	D	L	D	W	L	D	L	W	D	L
Ranong United	D	L	D	W	W	L	D	D	L	D	W	W	L	D	W	D	L	D	L	W	L	W	L	D	L	L	W	D	W	L	L	L	D	W
Kasetsart	L	W	D	L	W	L	D	L	L	W	D	D	W	L	D	D	W	D	L	L	D	L	W	D	W	L	W	W	D	D	L	L	D	L
Chiangmai	W	W	D	D	L	L	W	D	L	L	L	L	W	W	L	L	W	D	W	W	D	L	L	D	L	D	L	L	L	L	W	W	D	L
Customs Ladkrabang United	W	D	D	L	W	W	L	L	D	L	L	W	D	L	D	L	L	L	W	D	D	L	L	L	L	L	W	L	W	D	W	L	L	W
Rajpracha	D	L	D	D	D	D	D	L	D	L	D	L	W	L	L	D	L	D	W	L	W	D	L	L	L	W	L	W	L	L	D	W	L	W
Khon Kaen	L	L	L	D	L	W	L	W	D	L	L	D	L	W	L	D	L	L	L	L	D	L	D	L	D	L	D	W	W	L	L	L	D	L
Navy	L	L	L	L	D	L	D	L	L	L	W	L	D	L	L	L	L	L	D	L	L	L	L	L	L	L	L	D	L	W	L	L	L	L

Source: Thai League
W = Won; D = Drawn; L = Lost

=== Results ===
Home \ Away	AYU	CNH	CMI	CLU	KST	KKN	LPG	LPW	MKU	NPU	NVY	PRE	RCA	RNU	RYG	STI	TRT	UDT
Ayutthaya United	—	5–3	2–1	1–1	1–1	1–0	1–1	1–1	1–3	2–2	4–0	2–2	2–0	1–0	1–0	1–2	0–0	1–1
Chainat Hornbill	3–2	—	2–2	2–2	3–2	2–1	1–1	3–3	0–2	3–0	2–0	2–0	0–0	3–1	2–2	2–2	2–0	1–2
Chiangmai	2–0	1–3	—	1–2	2–0	2–1	0–6	1–4	1–3	1–0	2–1	1–0	0–0	0–0	2–1	1–2	0–1	1–1
Customs Ladkrabang United	1–0	1–3	0–0	—	2–1	1–0	1–2	1–1	5–2	0–1	2–1	1–3	3–1	2–0	1–2	1–4	1–2	3–9
Kasetsart	0–2	0–4	0–0	1–1	—	2–1	1–2	0–3	2–2	1–0	1–0	0–1	3–2	1–0	1–1	1–4	2–0	2–2
Khon Kaen	0–0	1–1	1–1	0–2	0–0	—	1–3	0–1	2–2	1–0	3–1	1–1	1–0	1–0	0–0	1–2	1–1	1–3
Lampang	3–0	0–0	1–0	2–0	5–1	7–1	—	0–1	1–1	1–1	2–2	0–1	1–1	2–0	2–1	1–1	1–2	2–0
Lamphun Warriors	2–1	3–0	3–2	2–0	1–0	2–1	3–3	—	3–1	3–1	4–0	1–1	2–0	4–1	2–0	1–1	1–2	2–0
Muangkan United	2–1	0–1	2–1	1–0	1–2	3–3	1–3	0–1	—	1–2	3–2	2–1	2–2	2–2	3–1	3–1	2–2	6–1
Nakhon Pathom United	0–0	0–1	1–2	4–4	1–0	1–0	1–1	0–0	4–4	—	3–2	2–1	1–1	1–2	1–4	1–0	1–1	2–2
Navy	3–4	1–3	1–3	3–0	0–0	3–0	0–3	1–1	1–2	2–3	—	1–3	1–1	1–1	0–1	1–2	0–3	0–1
Phrae United	2–1	2–2	3–0	2–1	0–0	2–1	1–1	3–2	2–2	1–1	4–0	—	1–1	1–2	2–0	1–2	2–0	2–1
Rajpracha	3–0	4–1	0–3	3–0	1–1	2–0	0–2	0–1	1–4	2–1	1–0	0–0	—	1–0	3–3	0–1	1–1	0–1
Ranong United	1–1	0–1	1–1	3–3	0–0	2–1	2–2	3–2	1–2	0–1	2–0	1–0	1–1	—	1–0	1–1	1–0	3–3
Rayong	0–1	1–1	3–2	2–0	1–2	3–1	3–1	0–1	3–2	0–0	1–0	3–2	1–0	0–1	—	1–2	0–1	3–0
Sukhothai	5–0	3–0	4–1	1–0	2–2	3–2	2–1	2–1	2–2	2–1	3–0	0–3	4–2	5–1	2–1	—	2–2	5–0
Trat	4–0	1–0	3–1	2–1	1–0	2–3	4–2	0–1	4–1	2–0	2–0	1–1	1–0	1–0	1–1	4–3	—	2–1
Udon Thani	1–0	1–1	3–1	1–1	1–2	4–1	3–2	1–3	3–1	0–4	1–0	0–0	1–0	0–1	0–2	4–1	1–2	—

Source: Thai League
Legend: Blue = home team win; Yellow = draw; Red = away team win.
For upcoming matches, an "a" indicates there is an article about the rivalry between the two participants.

== Season statistics ==
=== Top scorers ===
As of 30 April 2022.

Rank	Player	Club	Goals
1	(Brazil) Thales Lima	Udon Thani (13 Goals); Lamphun Warriors (9 Goals)	22
2	(Brazil) Deyvison Fernandes	Lampang	20
3	(Brazil) Leandro Assumpção	Muangkan United	17
3	(Brazil) Rodrigo Maranhão	Phrae United	17
3	(Brazil) Paulo Conrado	Trat	17
6	(Sweden) Osman Sow	Sukhothai	16
7	(Brazil) Jardel Capistrano	Rajpracha	14
7	(Japan) Kenzo Nambu	Nakhon Pathom United (5 Goals); Rayong (9 Goals)	14
9	(Thailand) Weerayut Sriwichai	Lampang	13
9	(South Korea) Choi Ho-ju	Customs Ladkrabang United (10 Goals); Rajpracha (3 Goals)	13
9	(Thailand) Chaowasit Sapsakunphon	Sukhothai	13

=== Hat-tricks ===
Player	For	Against	Result	Date
(Brazil) Felipe Wallace	Ayutthaya United	Chainat Hornbill	5–3 (H)	10 September 2021
(Brazil) Thales Lima^{4}	Udon Thani	Customs Ladkrabang United	9–3 (A)	17 November 2021
(Brazil) Leandro Assumpção	Muangkan United	Udon Thani	6–1 (H)	23 January 2022
(Brazil) Thales Lima	Lamphun Warriors	Chainat Hornbill	3–3 (A)	20 February 2022
(Brazil) Jardel Capistrano	Rajpracha	Customs Ladkrabang United	3–0 (H)	20 March 2022
(Brazil) Paulo Conrado	Trat	Lampang	4–2 (H)	23 April 2022

=== Clean sheets ===
As of 30 April 2022.

Rank	Player	Club	Clean sheets
1	(Thailand) Samuel Cunningham	Lamphun Warriors	10
1	(Thailand) Todsaporn Sri-reung	Trat	10
3	(Thailand) Soponwit Rakyart	Ayutthaya United	9
4	(Thailand) Suchin Yen-arrom	Lampang	8
4	(Thailand) Natchanon Jothavorn	Nakhon Pathom United	8
4	(Thailand) Pathomtat Sudprasert	Phrae United	8
7	(Thailand) Jaturong Samakorn	Chiangmai	7
7	(Thailand) Kritsana Klanklin	Kasetsart	7
9	(Thailand) Kiadtiphon Udom	Rajpracha (4) / Chiangmai (2)	6
9	(Thailand) Suppawat Srinothai	Rayong	6
9	(Thailand) Kittipun Saensuk	Sukhothai	6

== Awards ==
=== Monthly awards ===
Month	Player of the Month		Reference
Month	Player	Club	Reference
September	(Brazil) Paulo Conrado	Trat	
October	(Sweden) Osman Sow	Sukhothai	
November	(Brazil) Thales Lima	Udon Thani	
January	(Brazil) Leandro Assumpção	Muangkan United	
February	(Myanmar) Maung Maung Lwin	Lamphun Warriors	
March	(Thailand) Anuwat Noicheunphan	Chainat Hornbill	
April	(Thailand) Anan Yodsangwal	Lamphun Warriors	

== Attendances ==
=== Overall statistical table ===
Pos	Team	Total	High	Low	Average	Change
1	Lamphun Warriors	16,226	4,529	0	1,082	n/a^{†}
2	Muangkan United	15,513	2,712	0	1,034	n/a^{†}
3	Chainat Hornbill	15,303	1,235	0	956	−33.1%
4	Sukhothai	15,288	1,815	204	899	−65.9%
5	Udon Thani	14,601	1,800	545	859	−24.9%
6	Khonkaen	12,378	1,123	485	728	−65.0%
7	Chiangmai	9,324	956	0	717	−38.9%
8	Phrae United	9,809	895	423	577	−24.0%
9	Trat	9,488	855	348	558	−65.5%
10	Kasetsart	6,931	1,458	0	533	−16.6%
11	Rayong	7,198	900	0	514	−71.7%
12	Ranong United	5,268	1,285	0	439	−44.3%
13	Lampang	6,960	782	0	435	−21.2%
14	Nakhon Pathom United	4,871	638	0	375	−57.5%
15	Ayutthaya United	5,297	1,120	0	331	−60.5%
16	Navy	4,038	448	0	311	−60.5%
17	Customs Ladkrabang United	3,714	420	0	248	−45.5%
18	Rajpracha	0	0	0	0	n/a^{†}
	League total	162,177	4,529	0	634	−40.8%

Updated to games played on 30 April 2022
Source: Thai League
Notes:
^{†} Teams played previous season in Thai League 3

=== Attendances by home match played ===
Team \ Match played	1	2	3	4	5	6	7	8	9	10	11	12	13	14	15	16	17	Total
Ayutthaya United	0	150	210	390	215	175	320	250	420	278	383	275	284	347	275	205	1,120	5,297
Chainat Hornbill	0	531	421	657	952	1,120	951	1,090	852	1,090	1,235	1,012	1,055	1,130	1,029	1,123	1,055	15,303
Chiangmai	0	0	0	472	0	956	811	762	688	915	841	675	712	567	642	567	716	9,324
Customs Ladkrabang United	0	0	116	200	250	300	350	350	420	220	215	235	195	190	180	218	275	3,714
Kasetsart	0	0	0	0	432	320	372	380	310	420	720	422	642	520	415	520	1,458	6,931
Khonkaen	732	641	625	836	1,123	545	610	655	485	722	915	844	628	645	638	815	919	12,378
Lampang	0	320	151	420	542	437	572	486	434	312	430	572	314	376	782	218	594	6,960
Lamphun Warriors	0	0	359	353	459	750	628	693	578	1,021	1,220	1,193	1,230	1,021	932	1,230	4,529	16,226
Muangkan United	0	0	990	909	675	1,190	1,091	1,006	258	1,090	1,198	759	1,135	592	1,127	781	2,712	15,513
Nakhon Pathom United	0	0	0	0	350	423	125	372	375	385	278	325	315	421	638	389	475	4,871
Navy	0	0	0	0	261	369	448	269	271	260	290	250	320	350	220	350	380	4,038
Phrae United	478	423	532	634	725	895	562	532	683	616	458	496	697	433	498	583	564	9,809
Rajpracha	0	0	0	0	0	0	0	0	0	0	0	0	0	0	0	0	0	0
Ranong United	0	0	0	100	97	320	467	410	0	1,285	447	358	0	310	352	246	876	5,268
Rayong	0	0	0	256	423	390	326	402	847	900	844	358	621	464	641	361	365	7,198
Sukhothai	204	208	306	273	489	730	980	841	1,015	1,492	1,239	1,196	1,149	1,164	1,035	1,152	1,815	15,288
Trat	595	359	348	495	515	559	695	695	755	595	515	855	595	523	599	395	395	9,488
Udon Thani	845	970	1,030	694	730	753	980	985	785	430	340	750	745	760	545	1,800	1,459	14,601

== See also ==
- 2021–22 Thai League 1
- 2021–22 Thai League 3
- 2021–22 Thailand Amateur League
- 2021–22 Thai FA Cup
- 2021–22 Thai League Cup
- 2021 Thailand Champions Cup
