= 2024–25 PT Prachuap F.C. season =

PT Prachuap
2024-25 season
- Chairman: (Thailand) Songkiet Limarunrak
- Manager: (Thailand) Sasom Pobprasert
- Stadium: Sam Ao Stadium; Prachuap Khiri Khan, Thailand

The 2024-25 season marks PT Prachuap's 7th consecutive year in Thailand's top-flight football, following their promotion from Thai League 2 in 2017. This season, PT Prachuap will compete in three tournaments: the Thai League, FA Cup, and League Cup.

On 25 June 2024, the Thai League announced the schedule for the upcoming 2024-25 Thai League 1 season. The season commenced on 9 August 2024 and will conclude on 27 April 2025.

== Current Squad ==
As of 10 January 2025

Squad No.	Name	Nationality	Date of birth (age)	Previous club / Loan from / Loan for
Goalkeepers
1	Rattanai Songsangchan	(Thailand)	10 June 1995 (age 31)	(Thailand) Port
17	Worawut Sukhuna	(Thailand)	24 June 2000 (age 26)	(Thailand) Samut Prakan City
18	Soponwit Rakyart	(Thailand)	25 January 2001 (age 25)	(Thailand) Muangthong United
Defenders
3	Amir Ali Chegini	(Iran)	11 July 1995 (age 31)	(Thailand) Nakhon Pathom United
5	Airton	(Brazil)	12 March 1990 (age 36)	(Thailand) Port
11	Saharat Pongsuwan	(Thailand)	11 June 1996 (age 30)	(Thailand) BG Pathum United
14	Peerawat Akkratum	(Thailand)	3 December 1998 (age 27)	(Thailand) Buriram United
15	Jesper Nyholm	(Philippines) (Sweden)	10 September 1993 (age 33)	(Malaysia) Perak
25	Pawee Tanthatemee	(Thailand)	22 October 1996 (age 30)	(Thailand) Ratchaburi
27	Nattapon Malapun	(Thailand)	10 January 1994 (age 32)	(Thailand) Suphanburi
40	Saranyu Plangwal	(Thailand)	18 May 1999 (age 27)	(Thailand) Trang
74	Phon-Ek Jensen	(Thailand) (Denmark)	30 May 2003 (age 23)	(Thailand) Pattaya United
77	Khiron Oonchaiyaphum	(Thailand)	21 November 1999 (age 26)	(Thailand) Maraleina
Midfielders
4	Chatmongkol Thongkiri	(Thailand)	5 May 1997 (age 29)	On loan from (Thailand) BG Pathum United
8	Saharat Kanyaroj	(Thailand)	9 June 1994 (age 32)	(Thailand) Muangthong United
9	Chutipol Thongthae	(Thailand)	23 January 1991 (age 35)	On loan from (Thailand) Buriram United
23	Kannarin Thawornsak	(Thailand)	27 May 1997 (age 29)	(Thailand) Muangthong United
24	Sivakorn Tiatrakul	(Thailand)	7 July 1994 (age 32)	On loan from (Thailand) BG Pathum United
30	Jittiphat Wasungnoen	(Thailand)	7 June 2005 (age 21)	(Thailand) Maraleina
70	Prasid Jantum	(Thailand)	30 April 1995 (age 31)	(Thailand) Suphanburi
97	Zopfan Sanron	(Thailand)	-	(Thailand) Debsirin School
Forwards
10	Tauã	(Brazil)	29 December 1993 (age 32)	(Thailand) Lamphun Warriors
13	Yotsakorn Burapha	(Thailand)	8 June 2005 (age 21)	On loan from (Thailand) Chonburi
19	Iklas Sanron	(Thailand)	16 December 2004 (age 21)	(Thailand) Chamchuri United
21	Andrija Filipović	(Croatia)	18 April 1997 (age 29)	(Uzbekistan) Bunyodkor
41	Phanthamit Praphanth	(Thailand)	12 November 2003 (age 23)	(Thailand) Chonburi
48	Jehhanafee Mamah	(Thailand)	24 October 2005 (age 21)	(Thailand) Yala
88	Jiraphan Phasukhan	(Thailand)	8 August 1993 (age 33)	(Thailand) Nongbua Pitchaya
91	Chrigor	(Brazil)	13 November 2000 (age 25)	On loan from (Thailand) Buriram United
99	Jeong Woo-geun	(South Korea)	1 March 1991 (age 35)	(Thailand) Police Tero
Players loaned out / left during season
-	Siwapong Pankaew	(Thailand)	27 December 1996 (age 29)	Loan out to (Thailand) PT Satun
-	Nopphon Ponkam	(Thailand)	19 July 1996 (age 30)	Contract terminated
-	Chatchai Budprom	(Thailand)	4 February 1987 (age 39)	Loan agreement termination
-	Samuel Cunningham	(Thailand) (United States)	18 January 1989 (age 37)	Loan out to (Thailand) Mahasarakham SBT
-	Pathomchai Sueasakul	(Thailand)	10 October 1988 (age 38)	Loan out to (Thailand) Chonburi
-	Thanaset Sujarit	(Thailand)	15 November 1994 (age 31)	Loan out to (Thailand) Chonburi
-	Vander Luiz	(Brazil)	17 April 1990 (age 36)	Contract terminated
-	Barros Tardeli	(Brazil)	2 March 1990 (age 36)	-
-	Chenrop Samphaodi	(Thailand)	2 June 1995 (age 31)	Loan out to (Thailand) Kanchanaburi Power
-	Sanukran Thinjom	(Thailand)	12 September 1993 (age 33)	Loan out to (Thailand) Chiangrai United

== Transfer ==
=== Pre-season transfer ===
==== In ====
Position	Player	Transferred From	Fee	Ref
DF	(Iran) Amir Ali Chegini	(Thailand) Nakhon Pathom United	Free	
FW	(Brazil) Barros Tardeli	(Thailand) Port	Free	
MF	(Thailand) Sanukran Thinjom	(Thailand) Chiangrai United	Free	
DF	(Thailand) Thanaset Sujarit	(Thailand) Trat	Free	
FW	(Brazil) Tauã	(Thailand) Lamphun Warriors	Free	
MF	(Thailand) Kannarin Thawornsak	(Thailand) Muangthong United	Free	
FW	(Brazil) Vander Luiz	(Thailand) Bangkok United	Free	
FW	(Thailand) Chenrop Samphaodi	(Thailand) BG Pathum United	Free	
GK	(Thailand) Samuel Cunningham	(Thailand) Nakhon Si United	Free	
MF	(Thailand) Jittiphat Wasungnoen	(Thailand) Maraleina	Free	
FW	(Thailand) Chitsanuphong Phimpsang	(Thailand) Maraleina	Free	
MF	(Thailand) Phuwadon Thaicharoen	(Thailand) Suankularb Wittayalai School	Free	
FW	(Thailand) Iklas Sanron	(Thailand) Chamchuri United	Free	

==== Out ====
Position	Player	Transferred To	Fee	Ref
FW	(Palestine) Tamer Seyam	Unattached (Note: Later joined Penang)	End of contract	
FW	(Brazil) Samuel Rosa	(Hong Kong) Lee Man	Free	
DF	(Indonesia) Yanto Basna	Unattached	End of contract	
FW	(Brazil) Derley	Unattached (Note: Later joined Chonburi)	Free	
FW	(Thailand) Apichart Denman	(Thailand) Sukhothai	Free	
DF	(Thailand) Sirisak Faidong	(Thailand) Uthai Thani	Free	
MF	(Thailand) Kasidech Wettayawong	(Thailand) Muangthong United	Free	
GK	(Thailand) Abdulfarus Sama-aeh	Unattached	End of contract	

==== Loan Out ====
Position	Player	Loaned To	Fee	Ref
GK	(Thailand) Siwapong Pankaew	(Thailand) PT Satun	Season loan	
MF	(Thailand) Thanawat Namphao	(Thailand) PT Satun	Season loan	
FW	(Thailand) Chitsanuphong Phimpsang	(Thailand) Suphanburi	Season loan	

=== Mid-season transfer ===
==== In ====
Position	Player	Transferred From	Fee	Ref

==== Loan In ====
Position	Player	Loaned To	Fee	Ref

==== Out ====
Position	Player	Loaned To	Fee	Ref

==== Loan Out ====
Position	Player	Loaned To	Fee	Ref

== Competitions ==
=== Overview ===
Competition	Starting round	Record							
Competition	Starting round	Pld	W	D	L	GF	GA	GD	Win %
Thai League	Matchday 1	6	3	1	2	10	5	+5	50.00
FA Cup		0	0	0	0	0	0	+0	—
League Cup		0	0	0	0	0	0	+0	—
Total		6	3	1	2	10	5	+5	50.00

Last updated: 15 September 2024
Source: Competitions

=== Thai League 1 ===
==== League table ====
Pos	Team	Pld	W	D	L	GF	GA	GD	Pts
5	Port	30	13	9	8	52	39	+13	48
6	Muangthong United	30	13	6	11	46	39	+7	45
7	PT Prachuap	30	12	8	10	49	39	+10	44
8	Lamphun Warriors	30	9	10	11	36	39	−3	37 (Note: Lamphun Warriors is ahead on the head-to-head record; Lamphun Warriors 4 pts , Uthai Thani 1 pts.)
9	Uthai Thani	30	9	10	11	37	35	+2	37

Source: Thai League
Rules for classification: Season in progress: 1) Points; 2) Goal difference; 3) Goals scored; End of season: 1) Points; 2) Head-to-head points; 3) Head-to-head goal difference; 4) Goals scored.

==== Results summary ====
Overall								Home						Away					
Pld	W	D	L	GF	GA	GD	Pts	W	D	L	GF	GA	GD	W	D	L	GF	GA	GD
6	3	1	2	10	5	+5	10	3	0	0	8	0	+8	0	1	2	2	5	−3

==== Matches ====
Win Draw Loss

9 August 2024 1	True Bangkok United	2-1	PT Prachuap	Pathum Thani
	Peerapat 45+6'; Thitiphan 79'		Vander 54'	Stadium: Thammasat Stadium; Attendance: 2,004; Referee: Putthipong Issising

17 August 2024 2	PT Prachuap	4-0	Nongbua Pitchaya	Prachuap Khiri Khan
	Tauã 45'; Jeong 60' (pen.); Jiraphan 82'; Phanthamit 90+1'			Stadium: Sam Ao Stadium; Attendance: 2,850; Referee: Warintron Sassadee

24 August 2024 3	Sukhothai	2-0	PT Prachuap	Sukhothai
	Siroch 5' 39'		Iklas (red card) 89'	Stadium: Thalay Luang Stadium; Attendance: 1,761; Referee: Warintron Sassadee

28 August 2024 4	PT Prachuap	3-0	Rayong	Prachuap Khiri Khan
	Tardeli 14'; Chenrop 74'; Saharat 90+8'		Diego (red card) 90+4'	Stadium: Sam Ao Stadium; Attendance: 2,970; Referee: Songkran Bunmeekiart

31 August 2024 5	Singha Chiangrai United	1-1	PT Prachuap	Chiang Rai
	Chinnawat 31'		Victor 80' (o.g.)	Stadium: Singha Chiangrai Stadium; Attendance: 3,180; Referee: Songkran Bunmeekiart

15 September 2024 6	PT Prachuap	1-0	Khonkaen United	Prachuap Khiri Khan
	Tardeli 37' (pen.)			Stadium: Sam Ao Stadium; Attendance: 3,117; Referee: Niwat Insa-ard

22 September 2024 7	Buriram United	6–0	PT Prachuap	Buriram
	Chaided 9'; Hemviboon 14'; Guilherme Bissoli 53'; Bunmathan 79'; Tabinas 86'; Chrigor 89'	Report	Amir Chegini (yellow card) 42'; Thinjom (yellow card) 43'; Tanthatemee (yellow card) 55'	Stadium: Chang Arena; Attendance: 15,282; Referee: (Thailand) Jirawit Phonkaew

28 September 2024 8	PT Prachuap	0–0	Port	Prachuap Khiri Khan
	Tauã (yellow card) 60'	Report	Fandi (yellow card) 82'; Boonlha (yellow card) 89'	Stadium: Sam Ao Stadium; Attendance: 3,471; Referee: (Thailand) Thapakorn Thongkorn

5 October 2024 9	PT Prachuap	2–2	BG Pathum United	Prachuap Khiri Khan
	Barros Tardeli (yellow card) 59'; Thawornsak (yellow card) 71'; Jeong Woo-geun 82' (pen.); Praphanth 90+9' (yellow card) 90+10'	Report	Gomis (yellow card) 12'; Choolthong 29'; Notsuda 59'; Warinthon Jamnongwat (yellow card) 84'; Wonggorn (yellow card) 90+2'; Anuin (yellow card) 90+7'	Stadium: Sam Ao Stadium; Attendance: 3,108; Referee: (Thailand) Natee Choosuwan

20 October 2024 10	Nakhon Pathom United	1–1	PT Prachuap	Nakhon Pathom
	Thanawat Montree (yellow card) 40'; Taku Ito 45+3' (pen.); Sunchai Chaolaokhwan (yellow card) 65'; Jennarong Phupha (yellow card) 79'; Chaiyaphon Otton (yellow card) 89'	Report	Thinjom (yellow card) 16'; Vander (yellow card) 32'; Tauã 76'	Stadium: Nakhon Pathom Sport School Stadium; Attendance: 1,521; Referee: (Thailand) Songkran Bunmeekiart

27 October 2024 11	PT Prachuap	3–0	Uthai Thani	Prachuap Khiri Khan
	Tanthatemee (yellow card) 42'; Praphanth 50'; Jeong Woo-geun 65'; Barros Tardeli 89'; Jittiphat Wasungnoen (yellow card) 90+2'	Report	Weidersjö (yellow card) 37'; Aksornsri (yellow card) 75'; Rattanapoom (yellow card) 90+4'	Stadium: Sam Ao Stadium; Attendance: 3,108; Referee: (Thailand) Sivakorn Pu-udom

2 November 2024 12	Muangthong United	0–2	PT Prachuap	Nonthaburi
	Panthong (yellow card) 58'; Do (yellow card) 69'	Report	Praphanth 17'; Thongkiri (yellow card) 53'; Airton (yellow card) 55'; Jeong Woo-geun 59'; Barros Tardeli (yellow card) 87'	Stadium: Thunderdome Stadium; Attendance: 3,044; Referee: (Thailand) Warintorn Sassadee

9 November 2024 13	PT Prachuap	3–2	Ratchaburi	Prachuap Khiri Khan
	Vander (yellow card) 42'; Thawornsak (yellow card) 45+1'; Airton 52'; Jiraphan Phasukhan (yellow card) 58'; Praphanth 77'; Ornchaiyaphum (yellow card) 78'; Kanyaroj 82' (yellow card) 90'	Report	Depres 29'; Sorada 43'; Jakkuprasat (yellow card) 59' (yellow-red card) 61'; Srisuwan (yellow card) 90'; Kim Ji-min (yellow card) 90+4'	Stadium: Sam Ao Stadium; Attendance: 3,108; Referee: (Thailand) Sivakorn Pu-udom

24 November 2024 14	Lamphun Warriors	v	PT Prachuap	Lamphun
				Stadium: Lamphun Warriors Stadium

29 November 2024 15	PT Prachuap	v	Nakhon Ratchasima	Prachuap Khiri Khan
				Stadium: Sam Ao Stadium

=== Thai FA Cup ===
==== Matches ====
Win Draw Loss

=== Thai League Cup ===
==== Matches ====
Win Draw Loss

30 October 2024 First Round	Police Tero	1-2	PT Prachuap	Lak Si, Bangkok
	Fernando Viana 75'	Report	Barros Tardeli 46' 69' (pen.)	Stadium: Boonyachinda Stadium; Attendance: 521; Referee: (Thailand) Winat Phophat

== Team statistics ==
=== Appearances and goals ===
As of 15 September 2024

No.	Pos.	Player	League		FA Cup		League Cup		Total	
No.	Pos.	Player	Apps.	Goals	Apps.	Goals	Apps.	Goals	Apps.	Goals
1	GK	(Thailand) Rattanai Songsangchan	0	0	0	0	0	0	0	0
3	DF	(Iran) Amir Ali Chegini	6	0	0	0	0	0	6	0
4	MF	(Thailand) Chatmongkol Thongkiri	6	0	0	0	0	0	6	0
5	DF	(Brazil) Airton	5	0	0	0	0	0	5	0
6	MF	(Thailand) Nopphon Ponkam	3	0	0	0	0	0	3	0
8	MF	(Thailand) Saharat Kanyaroj	6	1	0	0	0	0	6	1
9	MF	(Thailand) Chutipol Thongthae	2	0	0	0	0	0	2	0
10	FW	(Brazil) Tauã	6	1	0	0	0	0	6	1
11	DF	(Thailand) Saharat Pongsuwan	4	0	0	0	0	0	4	0
13	GK	(Thailand) Abdulfarus Sama-aeh	0	0	0	0	0	0	0	0
14	DF	(Thailand) Peerawat Akkratum	1	0	0	0	0	0	1	0
17	FW	(Thailand) Chenrop Samphaodi	5	1	0	0	0	0	5	1
18	MF	(Thailand) Sanukran Thinjom	4	0	0	0	0	0	4	0
19	FW	(Thailand) Iklas Sanron	2	0	0	0	0	0	2	0
20	FW	(Brazil) Vander Luiz	6	1	0	0	0	0	6	1
21	FW	(Thailand) Chitsanuphong Phimpsang	0	0	0	0	0	0	0	0
23	MF	(Thailand) Kannarin Thawornsak	4	0	0	0	0	0	4	0
25	DF	(Thailand) Pawee Tanthatemee	6	0	0	0	0	0	6	0
27	DF	(Thailand) Nattapon Malapun	0	0	0	0	0	0	0	0
30	MF	(Thailand) Jittiphat Wasungnoen	0	0	0	0	0	0	0	0
31	MF	(Thailand) Pathomchai Sueasakul	2	0	0	0	0	0	2	0
36	DF	(Thailand) Thanaset Sujarit	3	0	0	0	0	0	3	0
37	FW	(Brazil) Barros Tardeli	6	2	0	0	0	0	6	2
38	GK	(Thailand) Chatchai Budprom	6	0	0	0	0	0	6	0
41	FW	(Thailand) Phanthamit Praphanth	3	1	0	0	0	0	3	1
43	DF	(Thailand) Wanchat Choosong	0	0	0	0	0	0	0	0
44	DF	(Thailand) Jirapat Fuangfoorat	0	0	0	0	0	0	0	0
69	MF	(Thailand) Thanawat Namphao	0	0	0	0	0	0	0	0
70	MF	(Thailand) Prasid Jantum	1	0	0	0	0	0	1	0
74	DF	(Thailand) Phon-Ek Jensen	0	0	0	0	0	0	0	0
77	DF	(Thailand) Khiron Oonchaiyaphum	2	0	0	0	0	0	2	0
88	FW	(Thailand) Jiraphan Phasukhan	4	1	0	0	0	0	4	1
89	GK	(Thailand) Samuel Cunningham	0	0	0	0	0	0	0	0
99	FW	(South Korea) Jeong Woo-geun	3	1	0	0	0	0	3	1
	MF	(Thailand) Phuwadon Thaicharoen	0	0	0	0	0	0	0	0
Players loaned out / left during season
	GK	(Thailand) Siwapong Pankaew	0	0	0	0	0	0	0	0

== Overall summary ==
=== Season summary ===
Games played	5 (5 Thai League, 0 FA Cup, 0 League Cup
Games won	2 (2 Thai League, 0 FA Cup, 0 League Cup
Games drawn	1 (1 Thai League, 0 FA Cup, 0 League Cup
Games lost	2 (2 Thai League, 0 FA Cup, 0 League Cup
Goals scored	9 (9 Thai League, 0 FA Cup, 0 League Cup
Goals conceded	5 (5 Thai League, 0 FA Cup, 0 League Cup
Goal difference	+4
Clean sheets	1 (1 Thai League, 0 FA Cup, 0 League Cup
Best result	4-0 vs Nongbua Pitchaya (17 Aug 24)
Worst result	
Most appearances	
Top scorer	
Points	7
