= Christian Rontini =

Filipino footballer (born 1999)

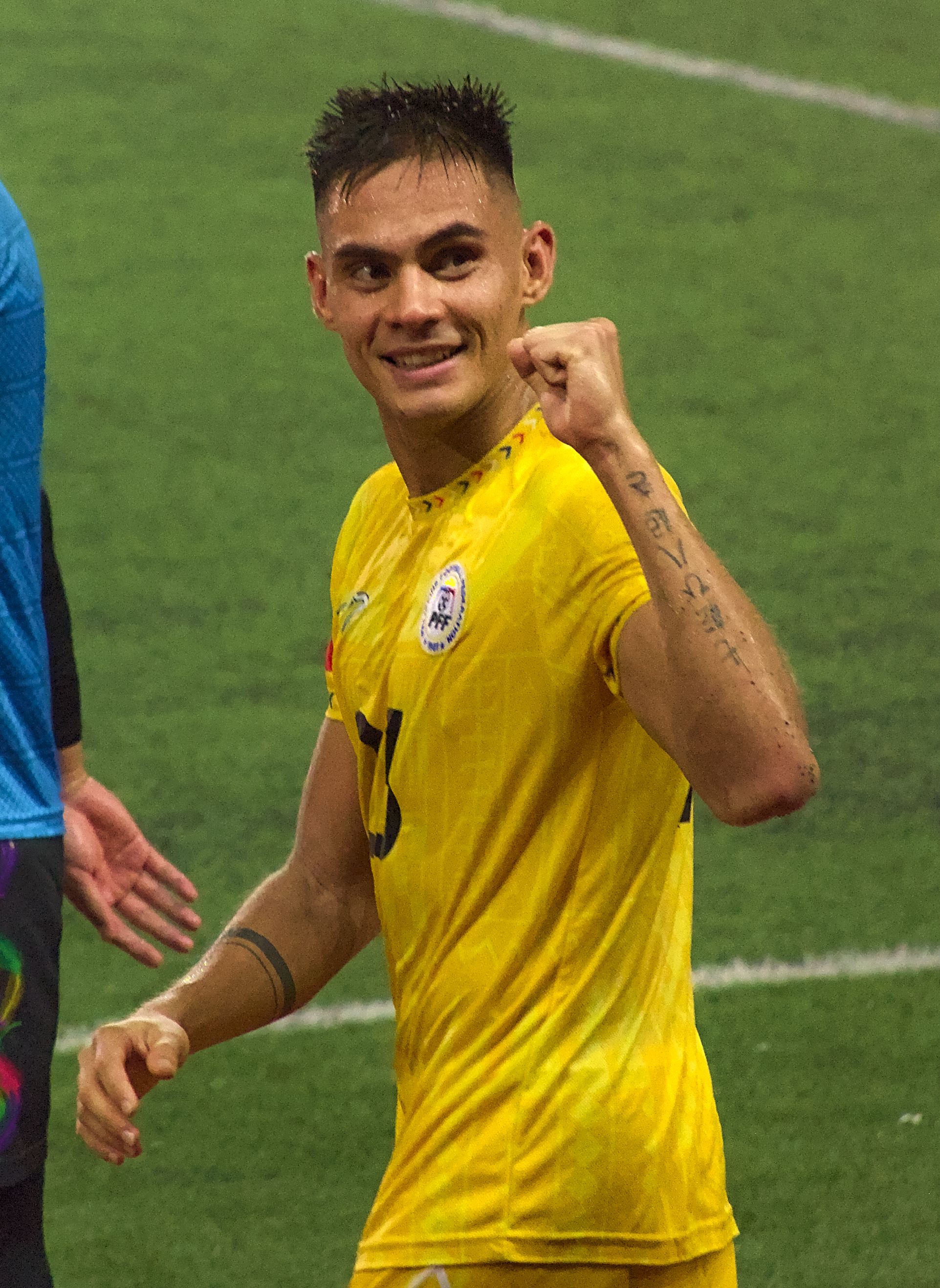
- Rontini with the Philippines in 2023

Personal information
- Full name: Christian Mangaron Rontini
- Date of birth: 20 July 1999 (age 27)
- Place of birth: Bagno a Ripoli, Italy
- Height: 1.87 m (6 ft 2 in)
- Positions: Centre-back; defensive midfielder

Youth career
- Floria 2000

Senior career*
Years	Team	Apps	(Gls)
2016	Verbania	0	(0)
2018–2021	Sangiovannese	37	(3)
2020	→ Azkals Development Club (loan)	5	(0)
2021	Antella	0	(0)
2021–2022	Azkals Development Club	0	(0)
2022–2023	Penang	15	(0)
2023	Kelantan	5	(0)
2023–2024	Persita Tangerang	29	(3)
2024	Madura United	9	(0)
2025	Nongbua Pitchaya	10	(0)
2025–	Antella	0	(0)

International career^{‡}
2019–2021	Philippines U23	7	(2)
2019–	Philippines	26	(1)
2026	Philippines U23	3	(0)
- * Club domestic league appearances and goals as of 30 April 2025 ‡ National team caps and goals as of 22 September 2026

Christian Mangaron Rontini (born 20 July 1999), also known as Yasir Ali, is a professional footballer who plays as a centre-back or defensive midfielder. Born in Italy, he represents the Philippines national team.

== Personal life ==
Rontini decided to convert to Islam on 5 September 2023 at the Al-Azhom Mosque, Tangerang. After converting to Islam, he changed his name to Yasir Ali. Strong support for his conversion to Islam came from Javlon Guseynov, a player from Uzbekistan when both of them played for Persita Tangerang.

On 28 October 2023, Rontini married his girlfriend, Amanda Gonzáles who is the daughter of former Indonesia national team player Cristian Gonzáles. He officially married Amanda in a wedding ceremony held at the Royal Ambarrukmo pavilion, Yogyakarta.

== Club career ==
=== Youth ===
Rontini is a former youth player of Floria 2000.

=== Sangiovannese ===
In 2018, Rontini joined Serie D/E club Sangiovannese on a one-year deal.

After an impressive season, Rontini renewed his contract with Sangiovannese that kept him with the club until June 2020.

=== Azkals Development Club ===
In October 2021, Rontini signed with the Azkals Development Club (ADC) of the Philippines Football League (PFL).

=== Madura United ===
In July 2024, he was officially registered in Madura United squad for the 2024–25 Liga 1 season after playing at Persita Tangerang the previous season.

== International career ==
Rontini was born in Italy to an Italian father and a Filipino mother, which made him eligible to represent either Italy or the Philippines at the international level.

=== Philippines U-22 ===
Rontini was part of the Philippines U-22 squad that competed at the 2019 SEA Games on home soil.

He was included in the 20-man squad for the 2021 SEA Games held in Vietnam. He scored his first goal for the Philippines in a 4–0 win against Timor Leste.

=== Senior team ===
In 2019, it was reported that Rontini received an invitation to train with the Philippines national team.

He received his first call-up for the Philippines in a friendly match against China PR. He replaced Curt Dizon in the 86th minute of the match where the team lost 2–0.

== Career statistics ==
=== Club ===
As of match played 18 May 2025

Appearances and goals by club, season and competition
Club	Season	League			National cup		Continental		Other		Total	
Club	Season	Division	Apps	Goals	Apps	Goals	Apps	Goals	Apps	Goals	Apps	Goals
Verbania	2016–17	Serie D	0	0	—		—		—		0	0
Sangiovannese	2018–19	Serie D	28	3	—		—		1 (Note: Appearance in Coppa Italia Serie D)	0	29	3
Sangiovannese	2019–20	Serie D	9	0	—		—		1	0	10	0
Sangiovannese	Total		37	3	—		—		2	0	39	0
Azkals Development Club (loan)	2020	Philippines Football League	5	0	—		—		—		5	0
Antella	2021–22	—			—		—		—		—	
Azkals Development Club	2021	Philippines Football League	0	0	4	1	—		—		4	1
Penang	2022	Malaysia Super League	15	0	3	0	—		1 (Note: Appearance in Malaysia Cup)	0	19	0
Kelantan	2023	Malaysia Super League	5	0	0	0	—		—		5	0
Persita Tangerang	2023–24	I-League	29	3	—		—		—		29	3
Madura United	2024–25	I-League	6	0	—		1 (Note: Appearance in AFC Challenge League)	0	2 (Note: Appearances in President Cup)	0	9	0
Nongbua Pitchaya	2024–25	Thai League 1	10	0	1	0	—		—		11	0
Antella	2025–26	—			—		—		—		—	
Career total			107	6	8	1	1	0	5	0	121	7

=== International ===
As of match played 9 June 2026

Appearances and goals by national team and year
National team	Year	Apps	Goals
Philippines	2019	1	0
Philippines	2020	0	0
Philippines	2021	0	0
Philippines	2022	2	0
Philippines	2023	6	1
Philippines	2024	12	0
Philippines	2025	3	0
Philippines	2026	2	0
Total		26	1

Scores and results list the Philippines' goal tally first, score column indicates score after each Rontini goal.

List of international goals scored by Christian Rontini
No.	Date	Venue	Opponent	Score	Result	Competition
1	12 September 2023	Rizal Memorial Stadium, Manila, Philippines	Afghanistan	2–1	2–1	Friendly
