= Samuel Cunningham (footballer) =

Thai footballer (born 1989)

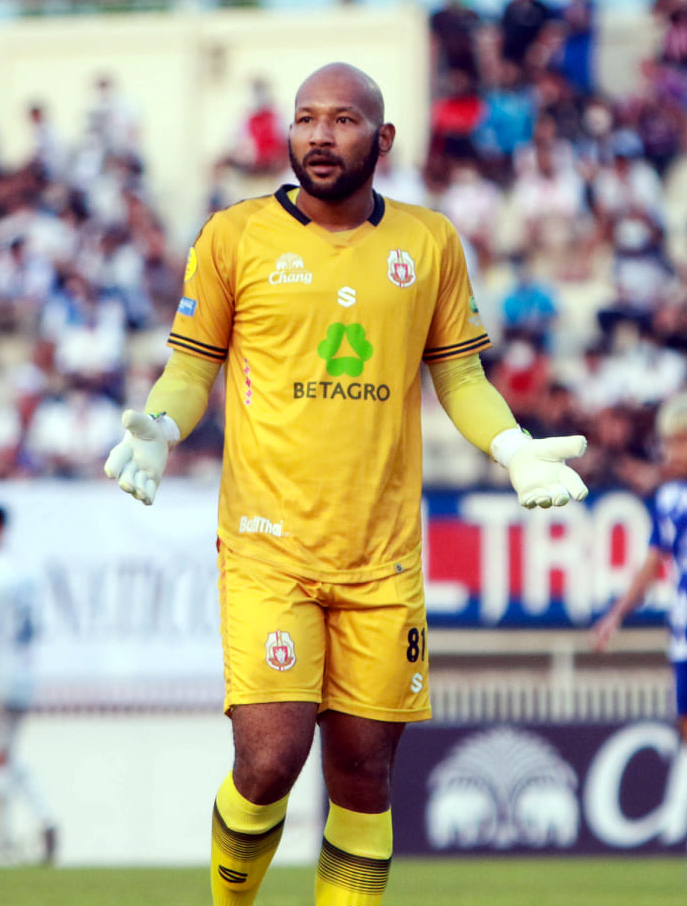
- Cunningham playing for the Lamphun Warriors.

Personal information
- Full name: Samuel Paul Cunningham
- Date of birth: 18 January 1989 (age 37)
- Place of birth: Nonthaburi, Thailand
- Height: 1.85 m (6 ft 1 in)
- Position: Goalkeeper

Team information
- Current team: Mahasarakham SBT
- Number: 89

Youth career
- 2003: Assumption College

Senior career*
Years	Team	Apps	(Gls)
2004–2005	Rajpracha	37	(0)
2006–2008	BEC Tero Sasana	7	(0)
2007–2008	→ Muangthong United (loan)	1	(0)
2009–2010	PEA	24	(0)
2010	TOT-CAT	14	(0)
2010	TTM Phichit	16	(0)
2011–2012	BEC Tero Sasana	2	(0)
2011	→ Suphanburi (loan)	12	(0)
2012–2015	Air Force Central	29	(0)
2016	Sisaket	8	(0)
2017	Air Force Central	16	(0)
2018–2021	Nakhon Ratchasima	66	(0)
2021–2022	Lamphun Warrior	22	(0)
2022	Nongbua Pitchaya	0	(0)
2023–2024	Nakhon Si United	34	(0)
2024–2025	PT Prachuap	1	(0)
2025	Mahasarakham SBT (loan)	11	(0)
2025–	Songkhla	0	(0)

International career
2008	Thailand U19	7	(0)
2010	Thailand U23	2	(0)
- * Club domestic league appearances and goals as of 13 July 2025

Samuel Paul Cunningham (Thai: แซมมวล พอล คันนิงแฮม; RTGS: Saemmuan Po Khaenninghaem, born 18 January 1989) is a Thai professional footballer who plays as a goalkeeper for Thai League 2 club Songkhla.

== Personal life ==
Cunningham was born in Nonthaburi to an African-American father, Samuel Cunningham Sr. (Cincinnati Ohio), and a Thai mother named Pannipa.

== International career ==
Cunningham received his first call-up to the senior Thai national team for the friendlies against India on September 4 and 8, 2010.

== Honours ==
=== Club ===
Muangthong United

- Thailand Division 2 League (1): 2007
- Thailand Division 1 League (1): 2008

Air Force Central

- Thai Division 1 League (1): 2013

Lamphun Warriors

- Thai League 2 (1): 2021–22
