= Natchanon Jothavorn =

Thai footballer

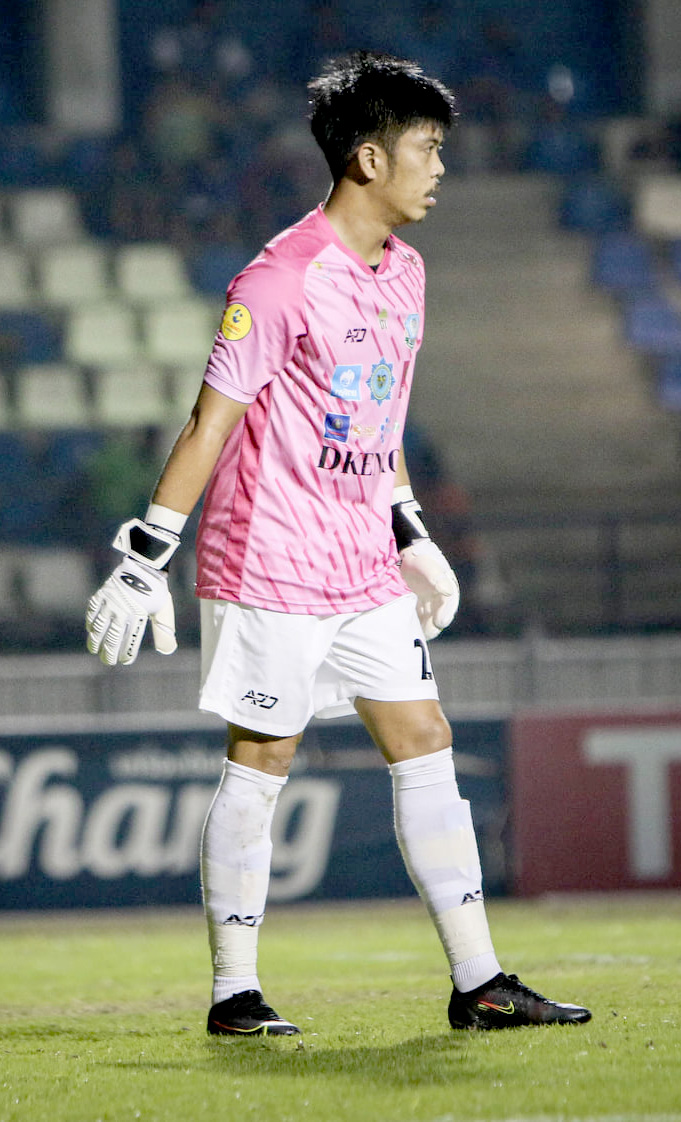

Personal information
- Full name: Natchanon Jothavorn
- Date of birth: 4 February 1989 (age 37)
- Place of birth: Nakhon Si Thammarat, Thailand
- Height: 1.80 m (5 ft 11 in)
- Position: Goalkeeper

Team information
- Current team: Nakhon Pathom United
- Number: 62

Youth career
- Bangkok Sports School

Senior career*
Years	Team	Apps	(Gls)
2013	RBAC		
2014	Samut Prakan United		
2015	Chanthaburi		
2016	Phuket		
2017	Thai Honda	18	(0)
2018–2019	Sisaket		
2020	MOF Customs United	16	(0)
2021–	Nakhon Pathom United	8	(0)
- * Club domestic league appearances and goals

Natchanon Jothavorn (Thai: ณัฐชานนท์ โจถาวร, born 24 January 1992) is a Thai professional footballer who plays as a goalkeeper for Thai League 2 club Nakhon Pathom United. He played for Thai Honda in Thai League 1 in 2017.
