= Weerayut Sriwichai =

Thai footballer

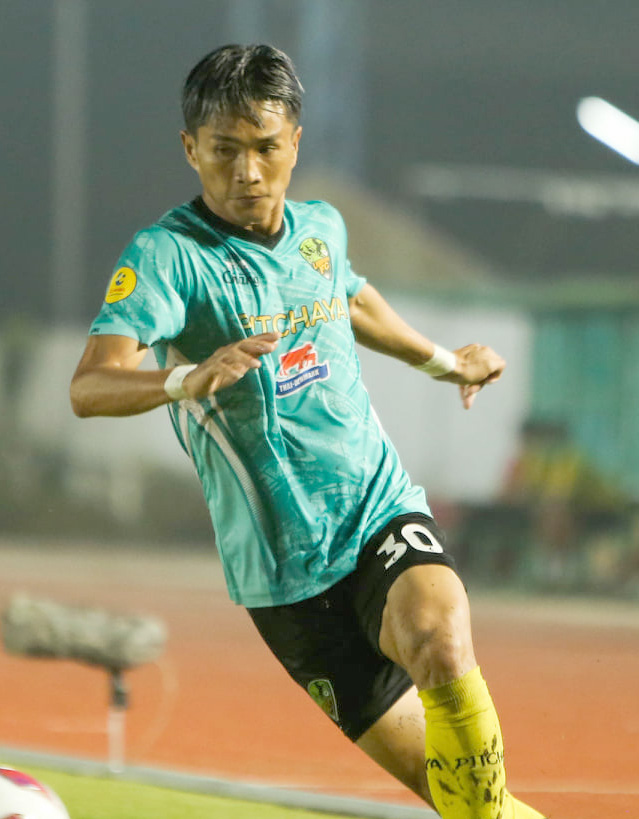
- Lampang FC, 2022 by Lady.Melon

Personal information
- Full name: Weerayut Sriwichai
- Date of birth: 1 March 1988 (age 38)
- Place of birth: Nakhon Phanom, Thailand
- Height: 1.77 m (5 ft 9 1/2 in)
- Position: Left winger

Team information
- Current team: Nongbua Pitchaya
- Number: 30

Senior career*
| Years | Team | Apps | (Gls) |
| 2013 | Nakhon Phanom | | |
| 2014 | PTT Rayong | 5 | (0) |
| 2015 | Krabi | | |
| 2016–2019 | Nongbua Pitchaya | | |
| 2020–2021 | Kasetsart | 3 | (0) |
| 2021 | Udon United | | |
| 2021–2022 | Lampang | 65 | (17) |
| 2023– | Nongbua Pitchaya | 38 | (9) |
- * Club domestic league appearances and goals

Weerayut Sriwichai (Thai: วีรยุทธ ศรีวิชัย, born March 1, 1988), is a Thai professional footballer who plays as a left-winger for Thai League 2 club Nongbua pitchaya.
