= Aleksandar Kapisoda =

Montenegrin footballer (born 1989)

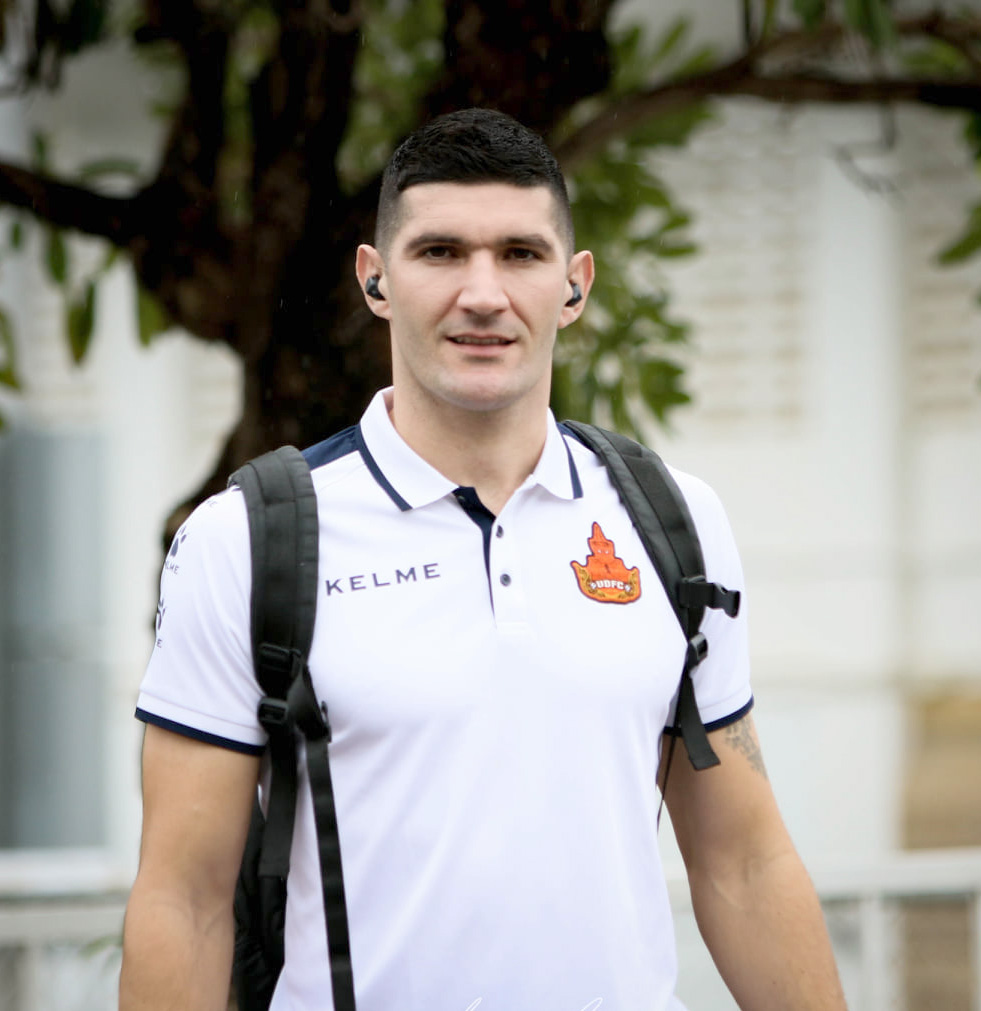
- Aleksandar Kapisoda playing for Udon Thani.

Personal information
- Date of birth: 17 September 1989 (age 37)
- Place of birth: Osijek, SFR Yugoslavia
- Height: 1.90 m (6 ft 3 in)
- Position: Centre-back

Team information
- Current team: Petrovac
- Number: 5

Senior career*
Years	Team	Apps	(Gls)
2009–2015	Mogren	103	(5)
2015–2016	Petrovac	12	(2)
2016–2018	Air Force Central	85	(8)
2019	Thai Honda	29	(5)
2020–2022	Udon Thani	58	(6)
2022–2023	Nakhon Si United	27	(5)
2023–2024	Nongbua Pitchaya	29	(4)
2024–	Petrovac	65	(7)
- * Club domestic league appearances and goals as of 17 June 2026

Aleksandar Kapisoda (born 17 September 1989 in Osijek) is a Montenegrin professional football player who plays for Petrovac.

When he was younger he is two time's karate champion in Serbia and Montenegro. Two time's champion with FK Mogren in Montenegro and one-time winner in Montenegro cup.

== Club career ==
=== Thailand ===
Securing a move to Air Force Central, then of the Thai League 1, in January 2016, Kapisoda was received well by the club, becoming their first foreign captain and even developing a camaraderie with the fans. Despite a poor start to the 2016 season, the Montenegrin defender helped Air Force Central reach fourth place, staying there for another year and gaining the attention of several other Thai teams.
