= Phanthamit Praphanth =

Thai footballer (born 2003)

Personal information
- Full name: Phanthamit Praphanth
- Date of birth: 12 November 2003 (age 23)
- Place of birth: Ubon Ratchathani, Thailand
- Height: 1.81 m (5 ft 11 1/2 in)
- Positions: Winger; forward

Team information
- Current team: PT Prachuap
- Number: 41

Youth career
- 2015–2021: Chonburi

Senior career*
| Years | Team | Apps | (Gls) |
| 2021–2023 | Chonburi | 8 | (1) |
| 2022–2023 | → Samut Prakan City (loan) | 27 | (5) |
| 2023– | PT Prachuap | 30 | (6) |
| 2024 | → DP Kanchanaburi (loan) | 11 | (2) |

International career^{‡}
| 2022 | Thailand U19 | 5 | (0) |
| 2022– | Thailand U23 | 11 | (1) |
| 2024– | Thailand | 1 | (0) |
- * Club domestic league appearances and goals as of 09:10, 17 December 2025 (UTC) ‡ National team caps and goals as of 14 November 2024

Phanthamit Praphanth (Thai: พันธมิตร ประพันธ์, born September 12, 2003) is a Thai professional footballer who plays as a winger or a forward for Thai League 1 club PT Prachuap and the Thailand national team.

== Club career ==
Praphanth came through Chonburi's academy and made his Thai League 1 debut against Suphanburi in February 2022, where his team lost 2-1. He scored his first goal for the club in a 1-2 away win against Samut Prakan City in March 2022.

In 2022, Praphanth was sent out on loan to Samut Prakan City to compete in the Thai League 2.

== International career ==
Praphanth played for Thailand U20 in the 2022 AFF U-19 Youth Championship.

In November 2024, Phanthamit was called up by Thailand national team for friendly match against Lebanon and Laos. He made his debut against Lebanon on 14 November.
