= Suchin Yen-arrom =

Thai footballer

Personal information
- Full name: Suchin Yen-arrom
- Date of birth: 21 February 1991 (age 35)
- Place of birth: Chonburi, Thailand
- Height: 1.90 m (6 ft 3 in)
- Position: Goalkeeper

Senior career*
Years	Team	Apps	(Gls)
2013–2014	Pattaya United	1	(0)
2015	Udon Thani	25	(0)
2016	Nongbua Pitchaya		
2017	Sukhothai	1	(0)
2018–2021	Nongbua Pitchaya	5	(0)
2021–2023	Lampang	31	(0)
2024	Samut Sakhon City	2	(0)
2024–2026	Nongbua Pitchaya	12	(0)
- * Club domestic league appearances and goals as of 12 February 2026

Suchin Yen-arromn (Thai: สุชิน เย็นอารมณ์, born February 21, 1991) is a Thai professional footballer who plays as a goalkeeper.

== Honour ==
Nongbua Pitchaya

- Thai League 2 Champions : 2020–21
