= Conrado (footballer, born 1991) =

Brazilian footballer

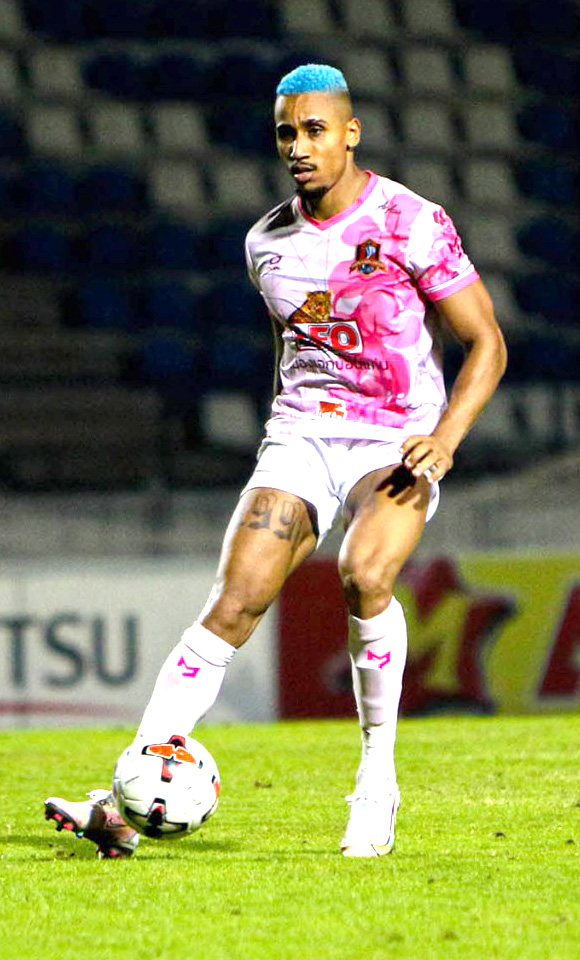
- Conrado with Khon Kaen United in 2021

Personal information
- Full name: Paulo Conrado do Carmo Sardin
- Date of birth: 18 July 1991 (age 35)
- Place of birth: Campinas, Brazil
- Height: 1.78 m (5 ft 10 in)
- Position: Forward

Senior career*
Years	Team	Apps	(Gls)
2016–2018	AC Nagano Parceiro	10	(2)
2019–2021	Khon Kaen United	56	(34)
2021–2022	Trat	33	(19)
2022–2023	BG Pathum United	13	(3)
2023	Dong A Thanh Hoa	13	(3)
2023–2024	Quang Nam	26	(5)
2024–2025	Nongbua Pitchaya	27	(8)
2025–2026	Ayutthaya United	21	(4)
- * Club domestic league appearances and goals as of 27 August 2025

Paulo Conrado do Carmo Sardin (born 18 July 1991), known as just Conrado, is a Brazilian footballer who plays as a forward.

== Career ==
Conrado joined J3 League club AC Nagano Parceiro in 2016.

Conrado joined V.League 1 club Dong A Thanh Hoa in 2023.

== Honours ==
Dong A Thanh Hoa

- Vietnamese National Cup: 2023

Individual

- Thai League 2 Top Scorer: 2020–21
- V.League 1 Player of the Month: April 2023
