= Tauã (footballer, born 1993) =

Brazilian footballer (born 1993)

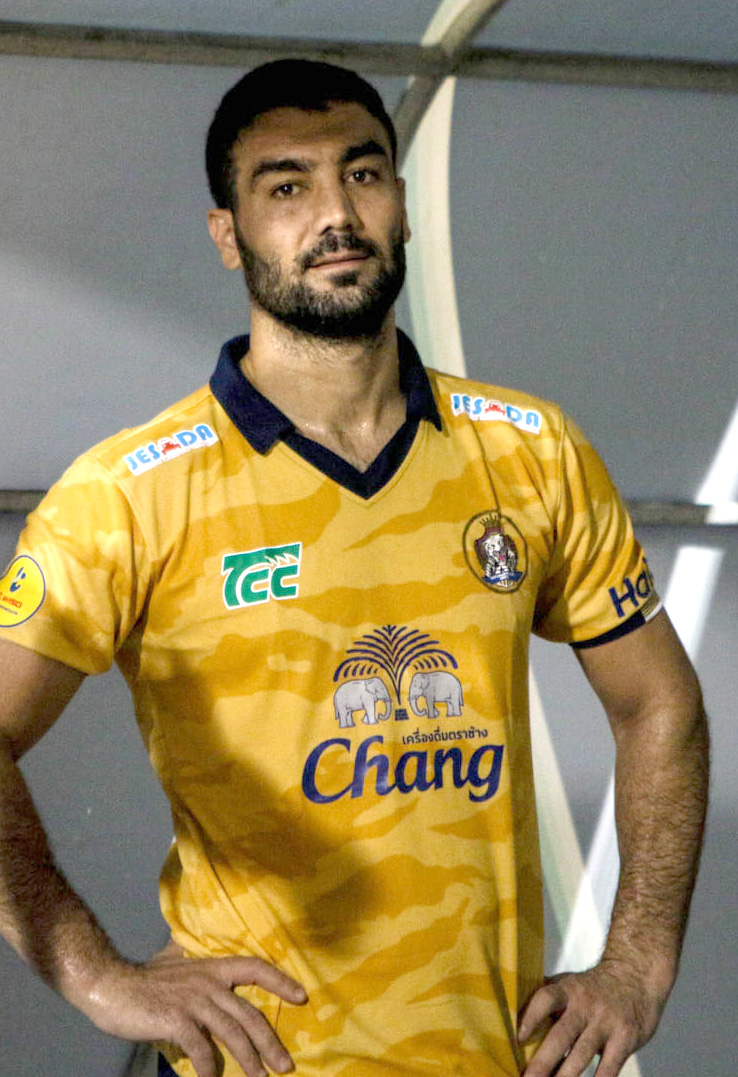
- Tauã in 2021

Personal information
- Full name: Tauã Ferreira dos Santos
- Date of birth: 29 December 1993 (age 32)
- Place of birth: Mongaguá, Brazil
- Height: 1.81 m (5 ft 11 in)
- Position: Striker

Team information
- Current team: PT Prachuap
- Number: 10

Youth career
- 2011–2012: Juventus-SP
- 2012: Avaí

Senior career*
| Years | Team | Apps | (Gls) |
| 2012 | Juventus-SP | 1 | (0) |
| 2012–2016 | Avaí | 41 | (1) |
| 2014 | → Marcílio Dias (loan) | 14 | (1) |
| 2014 | → Guarani de Palhoça (loan) | 6 | (1) |
| 2015 | → Santo André (loan) | 14 | (3) |
| 2016 | → Tombense (loan) | 4 | (0) |
| 2017–2019 | Tombense | 14 | (1) |
| 2018 | → Penapolense (loan) | 7 | (2) |
| 2018 | → Atlético Acreano (loan) | 12 | (1) |
| 2019 | → São Luiz (loan) | 14 | (0) |
| 2020–2021 | Nakhon Pathom United | 31 | (23) |
| 2021–2022 | PT Prachuap | 9 | (1) |
| 2022–2023 | Trat | 28 | (15) |
| 2023–2024 | Lamphun Warriors | 26 | (4) |
| 2024– | PT Prachuap | 49 | (11) |
- * Club domestic league appearances and goals as of 3 May 2026 (UTC)

Tauã Ferreira dos Santos (29 December 1993), also known as Tauã, is a Brazilian professional football plays as a striker for Thai League 1 club PT Prachuap.

== Career ==
Tauã was born in Mongaguá. He received his football training, among others, at Avaí. He made it into the professional squad in 2012. In the league operation of the Série B, he played on 3 November 2012, against Ceará. In the game, he was substituted in the 66th minute. He also appeared in the remaining four games of the season. The player scored his first goal as a professional during the Santa Catarina State Championship in 2013. In the game against Criciúma, he was substituted on 28 April in the 64th minute and scored in the 71st minute to make it 3-2.

At the start of the 2014 season, Tauã was initially loaned to Marcílio Dias, with whom he competed in the Santa Catarina State Championship. The player participated in 14 matches in the competition and scored four goals. He was then further loaned to Guarani de Palhoça. Here he played in the Série D and the Série B of the Santa Catarina State Championship. In both competitions, he played 26 games and scored 12 goals.

Tauã started the year 2015 at Santo André. However, he played only two games here. One in the second league of the São Paulo State Championship and one in the Copa do Brasil. He returned to his parent club Avaí for the league operations, which played in the season in the Série A. In the match against Palmeiras on 9 July 2015, Tauã made his first appearance in the top flight in the 77th minute. He made four more appearances. He was also often on the bench.

The following year, Tauã initially played for Avaí. He made a total of 27 appearances in official competitions for the club until August 2016, including twice in the Primeira Liga, nine times in the Santa Catarina State Championship, four times (one goal) in the Copa do Brasil, and twelve times in the Série B. In mid-August, Tauã was loaned to Tombense. The loan was limited until the end of the year. With the club, he played four more games in the Série C that year. At the end of the loan, Tauã was permanently acquired by Tombense. For the matches in the second league of the São Paulo State Championship in 2018, the player was loaned to Penapolense. After the loan ended, another followed. Tauã joined Atlético Acreano, with whom he competed in Série C. After the competition ended, he returned to Tombense.

After a loan stint at São Luiz, he moved to Thailand at the beginning of 2020. Here he signed a contract with the newly promoted second division club Nakhon Pathom United. The club from Nakhon Pathom played in the second Thai league, the Thai League 2. For Nakhon Pathom, he played 31 matches and scored 23 goals. In June 2021, he signed a contract with the Thai first division club PT Prachuap. On 29 May 2022, he stood with PT in the final of the Thai League Cup. Here they were defeated at the BG Stadium by Buriram United 4-0. He played nine league games for Prachuap. After the season, his contract was not renewed. In July 2022, he signed with the second division club Trat. At the end of the 2022/23 season, he celebrated with the club from Trat the runners-up title and promotion to the first league. He played 28 league games for Trat, scoring 15 goals. After the season, he left the club and joined the first division club Lamphun Warriors in June 2023.

== Honours ==
PT Prachuap

- Thai League Cup: 2021/22

Trat

- Thai League 2: 2022/23
