= 2024 Davao Aguilas F.C. season =

Davao Aguilas
2024 season
- Owner: Mike Atayde
- Head Coach: Aber Ruzgal
- Stadium: University of Makati Stadium
- Philippines Football League: 4th of 15
- Copa Paulino Alcantara: TBD
- All statistics correct as of July 15, 2024.

The 2024 season will be Davao Aguilas' 3rd season in the Philippines Football League and Copa Paulino Alcantara, returning to the league for the first time in over 5 years after abruptly withdrawing in December 2018.

The previous season saw the Davao side, now currently based in the University of Makati Stadium, make a return to the professional scene by participating in the 2023 Copa Paulino Alcantara, where they made a fairytale run to the final before losing in a rematch against Kaya–Iloilo in extra time. The club also reaffirmed their partnership with Japanese side Shonan Bellmare that initially started in 2018. The club's core, including Serge Kaole, Paolo Bugas, and Troy Limbo, were signed to brief tournament-long contracts, and departed the club for other PFL clubs joining in the expanded season. The team made a number of foreign signings including Japanese defender Shoma Sato and midfielder So Omae. The club's biggest acquisition was Philippine national team defender Daisuke Sato, who signed from Persib Bandung with the intention of establishing an academy in the country, called the Sato DAFC UMAK football school.

== Squad ==
As of 8 March 2024

Squad No.	Name	Nationality	Date of birth (age)	Previous club
Goalkeepers
1	Kenneth Guballo	(Philippines)	27 December 1997 (age 28)	(Philippines) Davao Aguilas Academy
16	Dini Ouattara	(Ivory Coast)	21 December 1994 (age 31)	(South Africa) Uthongathi
67	Yosuke Suzuki	(Philippines) (Japan)	25 December 1994 (age 31)	(Philippines) Maharlika Taguig
Defenders
3	Mun Jun-su	(South Korea)	18 August 1998 (age 27)	(Japan) Reilac Shiga
5	Reynald Villareal	(Philippines)	5 July 1988 (age 37)	(Philippines) Stallion Laguna
13	Kart Talaroc	(Philippines)	30 March 2001 (age 24)	(Philippines) Davao Aguilas Academy
18	Romel Catarinin	(Philippines)	27 August 1998 (age 27)	(Philippines) Davao Aguilas Academy
19	Yohann Fofana	(Ivory Coast)	—	—
27	Armageddon Estrellan	(Philippines)	31 July 2003 (age 22)	(Philippines) Davao Aguilas Academy
34	Shoma Sato	(Japan)	6 October 1999 (age 26)	(Austria) Bisamberg
66	Daisuke Sato	(Philippines)	20 September 1994 (age 31)	(Indonesia) Persib Bandung
Midfielders
6	OJ Clarino	(Philippines)	27 July 1990 (age 35)	(Philippines) Maharlika Manila
8	Jhomaray Sapal	(Philippines)	30 July 1999 (age 26)	(Philippines) Davao Aguilas Academy
9	Axel Andres	(Philippines)	27 June 2000 (age 25)	(Philippines) De La Salle–College of Saint Benilde
17	Richard Talaroc	(Philippines)	23 April 1995 (age 30)	(Philippines) Mendiola 1991
20	Marvin Bricenio	(Philippines) (Japan)	7 February 1996 (age 29)	(Philippines) Mendiola 1991
21	Muhammad Esa Siddiq	(Philippines) (Pakistan)	28 April 2004 (age 21)	(Philippines) CF Manila
24	Dosso Lancine	(Ivory Coast)	18 December 1998 (age 27)	—
26	So Omae	(Japan)	3 February 1995 (age 30)	(Cambodia) Prey Veng
31	Raynald Sapal	(Philippines)	16 July 2001 (age 24)	(Philippines) Davao Aguilas Academy
Forwards
4	Santino Rosales	(Philippines)	11 December 2000 (age 25)	(Philippines) Davao Aguilas Academy
7	Mun Te-su	(South Korea)	9 August 1994 (age 31)	(Japan) Osaka City
11	Uriel Dalapo	(Philippines)	8 August 2004 (age 21)	(Philippines) Azkals Development Team
12	Rendon Cielo	(Philippines)	10 August 1999 (age 26)	(Philippines) Davao Aguilas Academy
14	Ibrahima Ndour	(Senegal)	10 January 1995 (age 31)	(Philippines) Maharlika Taguig
23	Yusuke Unoki	(Japan)	30 April 1996 (age 29)	(Japan) Shinagawa CC Yokohama
30	Gino Clarino	(Philippines)	30 December 1993 (age 32)	(Philippines) Maharlika Taguig

== Transfers ==
Note: Flags indicate national team as defined under FIFA eligibility rules. Players may hold more than one non-FIFA nationality.

=== In ===
Date	Pos.	Nat.	Name	From	Ref.
Pre-season
February 10	DF	(Philippines)	Daisuke Sato	(Indonesia) Persib Bandung	
February 17	FW	(Philippines)	Gino Clarino	(Philippines) Maharlika Taguig	
February 17	MF	(Japan)	So Omae	(Cambodia) Prey Veng	
February 17	MF	(Philippines)	Esa Siddiq	(Philippines) CF Manila	
February 17	GK	(Philippines)	Yosuke Suzuki	(Philippines) Maharlika Taguig	
February 19	DF	(Japan)	Shoma Sato	(Austria) Bisamberg	
February 20	DF	(South Korea)	Mun Jun-su	(Japan) Reilac Shiga	
February 20	FW	(South Korea)	Mun Te-su	(Japan) Osaka City SC	
February 25	DF	(Philippines)	Armageddon Estrellan	(Philippines) Davao Aguilas Academy	
February 25	MF	(Philippines)	Raynald Sapal	(Philippines) Davao Aguilas Academy	
February 26	MF	(Philippines)	Marvin Bricenio	Free agent	
February 26	FW	(Senegal)	Ibrahima Ndour	(Philippines) Maharlika Taguig	
March 7	FW	(Japan)	Yusuke Unoki	(Japan) Shinagawa CC Yokohama	

=== Out ===
Date	Pos.	Nat.	Name	To	Ref.
Pre-season
February 12	DF	(Philippines)	Gansmari Antipuesto	(Philippines) Manila Montet	
February 26	MF	(Philippines)	Paolo Bugas	(Philippines) United City	
February 26	DF	(Philippines)	Pete Forrosuelo	(Philippines) United City	
February 28	MF	(Cameroon)	Serge Kaole	(Philippines) United City	
February 28	MF	(Philippines)	Troy Limbo	(Philippines) United City	
March 7	MF	(Philippines)	Marvin Angeles	(Philippines) United City	

== Preseason and friendlies ==
Win Draw Loss

=== Friendlies ===
February 26, 2024 Friendly	Davao Aguilas	2–0	Manila Montet	Makati
				Stadium: University of Makati Stadium

February 28, 2024 Friendly	Davao Aguilas	7–0	Tuloy	Makati
				Stadium: University of Makati Stadium

March 14, 2024 Friendly	Davao Aguilas	3–0	Maharlika Taguig	Makati
				Stadium: University of Makati Stadium

March 14, 2024 Friendly	Davao Aguilas	3–4	Kaya–Iloilo	Makati
	Ndour			Stadium: University of Makati Stadium

== Competitions ==
=== Overview ===
Competition	First match	Last match	Starting round	Final position	Record							
Competition	First match	Last match	Starting round	Final position	Pld	W	D	L	GF	GA	GD	Win %
Philippines Football League	May 4, 2024	July 14, 2024	Matchday 1	4th	14	10	2	2	39	6	+33	71.43
Copa Paulino Alcantara	TBD	TBD	TBD	TBD	0	0	0	0	0	0	+0	—
Total					14	10	2	2	39	6	+33	71.43

Last updated: July 15, 2024
Source: Competitions

=== Philippines Football League ===
==== Standings ====
Pos	Team	Pld	W	D	L	GF	GA	GD	Pts	Qualification
1	Kaya–Iloilo (Note: Assured a place in the AFC Champions League Two Group stage as 2023 Copa Paulino Alcantara Winners) (C)	14	13	1	0	82	5	+77	40	Qualification for 2024–25 AFC Champions League Two Group stage
2	Dynamic Herb Cebu	14	12	0	2	66	9	+57	36	Qualification for 2024–25 AFC Champions League Two Group stage
3	Stallion Laguna	14	10	2	2	65	12	+53	32	
4	Davao Aguilas	14	10	2	2	39	6	+33	32	
5	One Taguig	14	9	4	1	69	14	+55	31	
6	United City	14	9	3	2	51	13	+38	30	
7	Manila Digger	14	8	0	6	35	25	+10	24	

Source: PFL
Rules for classification: 1) Points; 2) Goal difference; 3) Goals scored.
(C) Champions
Notes:

Results summary

Overall								Home						Away					
Pld	W	D	L	GF	GA	GD	Pts	W	D	L	GF	GA	GD	W	D	L	GF	GA	GD
4	4	0	0	13	0	+13	12	3	0	0	8	0	+8	1	0	0	5	0	+5

Last updated: May 5, 2024.
Source: PFL
