= 2024 Philippines Football League =

6th season of the Philippines Football League

Philippines Football League
- Season: 2024
- Dates: April 6 – July 14
- Champions: Kaya–Iloilo; 2nd title
- Champions League Two: Kaya–Iloilo; Dynamic Herb Cebu
- ASEAN Club Championship: Kaya–Iloilo
- Matches: 105
- Goals: 569 (5.42 per match)
- Top goalscorer: Jarvey Gayoso (23 goals)
- Best goalkeeper: Dini Ouattara (9 clean sheets)
- Biggest home win: One Taguig 17–0 DB Garelli United (June 1)
- Biggest away win: Manila Montet 0–14 Kaya–Iloilo (June 15)
- Highest scoring: Dynamic Herb Cebu 16–2 DB Garelli United (June 1)
- Longest winning run: Kaya–Iloilo (May 5 – July 13) (10 matches)
- Longest unbeaten run: Kaya–Iloilo (Apr 7 – July 13) (14 matches)
- Longest winless run: Manila Montet (Apr 7 – July 13) (14 matches)
- Longest losing run: Manila Montet (Apr 7 – July 13) (14 matches)
- Highest attendance: 728 Kaya–Iloilo 9–0 Philippine Air Force (May 8)

The 2024 Philippines Football League was the sixth season of the Philippines Football League (PFL), the professional football league of the Philippines. The PFL was previously under the sponsorship title of Qatar Airways. The league saw the participation of 15 teams, the most ever since the league's inception, and was held in a single round-robin format from April 6 to July 14.

The league was originally planned to feature three phases and culminate in a knockout round format to decide the champion, although plans were changed before the competition started. Liga Futbol Inc. used the shortened format where all teams would play each other once. The season start was also delayed. After the success of the expanded 2023 Copa Paulino Alcantara, the PFL relaxed the requirements for new clubs to apply. Aside from the five current PFL teams and the remaining teams from the Copa, the league welcomed Manila Montet and One Taguig, which was initially registered as Taguig City United. The winners and runners-up of the league would qualify for the revised 2024–25 AFC Champions League Two. Kaya–Iloilo, the defending champions, secured their second consecutive title with one match left to play.

== Format changes ==
The Philippine Football Federation and Liga Futbol Inc. decided on shifting the season back to an intra-year format, starting in February. Due to the sudden withdrawals of Azkals Development Team and United City at the tail-end of the previous season, the league will be looking to increase the number of teams from 5 to a number ranging up to 16, the highest ever in the PFL.

This season would have marked the first change in the league format since 2017, with each team playing every team twice before a second round would split the league table into two, where teams would play the teams in their bracket once more. After the conclusion of those matches, the top eight teams overall would advance to a final series consisting of two-legged quarter- and semi-final ties, after which a champion would be crowned in the final. This plan was later abandoned and a single round robin format was implemented with a transition to an intra-year (spring-to-autumn) schedule, unlike the previous inter-year (autumn-to-spring) schedule from the 2022–23 season.

Though clubs may still play home and away matches, the league would also use a "hybrid home-and-away format", which will see more matches played at centralized venues to alleviate costs.

Important season dates
Date	Event
January 1	Opening of first transfer window
January 15	Deadline for club registration
January 20	Preliminary submission of roster (clubs must submit at least 18 players)
February 20	Second submission of roster (clubs must have a minimum of 25 players in roster with at least 7 players added)
April 6	PFL season start

== Teams ==
The PFL would adopt a hybrid format, allowing clubs with no professional club licenses to participate. Five clubs from the previous season initially confirmed its participation, alongside former participants Davao Aguilas and Loyola (formerly competing as Meralco Manila) who expressed their commitment to the upcoming season in November and December 2023, respectively. DB Garelli United, a team that participated in the Copa, and Manila Montet also confirmed their participation in December. The league initially planned to expand to a number of 12 clubs and invited all the other non-UAAP sides, but due to the overwhelming demand plans were made for further expansion.

In February 2023, United City, who had previously withdrawn midway through the 2022–23 season due to financial and legal issues with the Singaporean group Riau Capital Live, announced their return to the league. The club had previously opted out of participating in the 2023 Copa Paulino Alcantara. On February 5, the league officially announced that the number of participating clubs had grown to 15, the most teams to have participated in a PFL season. The other new clubs included four who had participated in the previous edition of the Copa; Manila Digger, Tuloy, Philippine Army, and 2019 participants Philippine Air Force, as well as a completely new club, One Taguig.

Team	Location (Note: General location where the club is based in. Only select clubs have their own/designated home stadium.)
Davao Aguilas	Tagum, Davao del Norte (Note: Davao Aguilas has designated the University of Makati Stadium in Taguig as its home venue for this season.)
DB Garelli United	Makati, Metro Manila
Dynamic Herb Cebu	Talisay, Cebu (Note: The Dynamic Herb Sports Complex is the home venue of Dynamic Herb Cebu.)
Kaya–Iloilo	Iloilo City, Iloilo (Note: The Iloilo Sports Complex is the home venue of Kaya–Iloilo. Campo Alcantara Stadium in nearby Pavia was used temporarily for this season.)
Loyola	Manila, Metro Manila
Maharlika Taguig	Taguig, Metro Manila (Note: The McKinley Hill Stadium is the home venue of Maharlika Taguig. However no league games were held in the stadium.)
Manila Digger	Taguig, Metro Manila
Manila Montet	Manila, Metro Manila (Note: Manila Montet has named the Rizal Memorial Stadium as its home venue.)
Mendiola 1991	Imus, Cavite
One Taguig	Taguig, Metro Manila
Philippine Air Force	Pasay, Metro Manila
Philippine Army	Taguig, Metro Manila
Stallion Laguna	Biñan, Laguna
Tuloy	Muntinlupa, Metro Manila
United City	Capas, Tarlac

=== Stadiums ===
Most league matches are scheduled to be held at the Rizal Memorial Stadium, a venue which was also explicitly named as Manila Montet's home.

Tagum-based Davao Aguilas, a club which are in partnership with the University of Makati in Taguig, scheduled to play their home matches at the school's stadium.

In January, the club renamed from Maharlika Manila to Maharlika Taguig following their location change. Although they have no matches scheduled in Taguig. The same goes for Mendiola 1991, Stallion Laguna, and United City which also have their designated home stadiums.

2024 Philippines Football League is located in Philippines	Manila	Iloilo City
2024 Philippines Football League is located in Philippines	Rizal Memorial Stadium	Iloilo Sports Complex
2024 Philippines Football League is located in Philippines	Capacity: 12,873	Capacity: 7,000
2024 Philippines Football League is located in Philippines	Taguig	Talisay, Cebu
2024 Philippines Football League is located in Philippines	University of Makati Stadium	Dynamic Herb Sports Complex
2024 Philippines Football League is located in Philippines	Capacity: 3,295	Capacity: 550

=== Personnel and kits ===
Team	Head coach	Captain	Kit manufacturer	Sponsors
Davao Aguilas	(Philippines) Aber Ruzgal	(Philippines) Daisuke Sato	(Philippines) Chronos Athletics	University of Makati^{1}, SpeedRegalo^{2}, Brodo^{2}, Wit.id^{2}
DB Garelli United	(Philippines) Karl Claudio	(Philippines) James Dorego	(Philippines) Chronos Athletics	Smokin' Hills^{2}, Growee^{2}, GSMH Law^{2}, Clink^{4}
Dynamic Herb Cebu	(Turkey) Memiş Özata	(Philippines) Nathanael Villanueva	(Philippines) RAD Apparel	Leylam^{1}, WinZir^{2}, Jpark Island Resort and Waterpark Cebu^{2}
Kaya–Iloilo	(Japan) Yu Hoshide	(Philippines) Audie Menzi	(Philippines) LGR Sportswear	LBC^{1}
Loyola	(Philippines) Roxy Dorlas	(South Korea) Kim Sung-min	(Philippines) RAD Apparel	Popeyes^{1}, Unioil^{2}, VV&Co^{2}
Maharlika Taguig	(Nigeria) Lerche Njang	(Philippines) Anton del Rosario	(Philippines) Blaze Athletics	AIA^{1}, Palaro^{2}
Manila Digger	(Philippines) Pong Liman	(South Korea) Shin Min-ki	(China) UCAN	OKFly^{1}
Manila Montet	(Philippines) Kenneth Arnaldo	(Philippines) Gansmari Antipuesto	(Vietnam) Wika Sport	The Montet Group^{1}
Mendiola 1991	(Philippines) Dan Padernal	(Iran) Hamed Hajimehdi	(Philippines) Ropa	Vill-Mell Trading^{2}, Mr. Freeze^{2}
One Taguig	(Philippines) Jovanie Villagracia	(Philippines) Kevin Ingreso	(Philippines) Azkals Sportswear	Chooks-to-Go^{2}, I Love Taguig^{2}
Philippine Air Force	(Philippines) Joebel Bermejo	(Philippines) Romeo Martinez Jr.	(Philippines) Chronos Athletics	Elan Vita^{1}
Philippine Army	(Philippines) Nestorio Margarse	(Philippines) Ricardo Becite	(Philippines) Chronos Athletics	Elan Vita^{1}
Stallion Laguna	(Philippines) Ernest Nierras	(Philippines) Matthew Nierras	(Philippines) Blaze Athletics	Giligan's Restaurant^{1}, Pythos^{2}, SCID^{2}
Tuloy	(Japan) Taketomo Suzuki	(Philippines) Harry Nuñez	(Philippines) Blaze Athletics	TSL Football Foundation^{1}
United City	(Spain) Ramon Tribulietx	(Canada) Matt Silva	(Indonesia) Almer Apparel	UCFC Fan Token^{1}, Fairmont Makati^{1}

Notes:

1. Located on the front of the shirt.
2. Located on the back of the shirt.
3. Located on the sleeves.
4. Located on the shorts.

=== Coaching changes ===
Team	Outgoing coach	Manner of departure	Date of vacancy	Position in table	Incoming coach	Date of appointment
Kaya–Iloilo	(Japan) Yu Hoshide	Demoted to assistant coach	August 5, 2023	Pre-season	(Northern Ireland) Colum Curtis	August 5, 2023
Dynamic Herb Cebu	(Turkey) Mehmet Kakil	Mutual consent	July 16, 2023	Pre-season	(United States) Joshua Schirmer	August 9, 2023
Maharlika Taguig	(Philippines) Roxy Dorlas	Appointed head coach of Loyola	July 16, 2023	Pre-season	(Nigeria) Lerche Njang	August 12, 2023
Manila Montet	None	N/A		Pre-season	(South Korea) Kim Jeong-il	December 13, 2023
DB Garelli United	(Philippines) Ake Pastoral	Undisclosed	December 17, 2023	Pre-season	(Philippines) Joel Villarino	December 17, 2023
Kaya–Iloilo	(Northern Ireland) Colum Curtis	Mutual consent	December 12, 2023	Pre-season	(Japan) Yu Hoshide	January 13, 2024
Dynamic Herb Cebu	(United States) Joshua Schirmer	Sacked	January 22, 2024	Pre-season	(Turkey) Memiş Özata	January 30, 2024
Manila Montet	(South Korea) Kim Jeong-il	Undisclosed	February 23, 2024	Pre-season	(Philippines) Eliezer Fabroada	February 23, 2024
United City	(Spain) Joan Esteva	Force majeure	February 16, 2023	Pre-season	(Romania) Marian Mihail	March 13, 2024
One Taguig	None	N/A		Pre-season	(Philippines) Jovanie Villagracia	March 21, 2024
Mendiola 1991	(Philippines) Joel Villarino	Appointed head coach of DB Garelli United	December 17, 2023	Pre-season	(Philippines) Christopher Pedimonte	April 6, 2024
Manila Montet	(Philippines) Eliezer Fabroada	Undisclosed	April 2024	12th	(Philippines) Dennis Balbin	April 21, 2024
United City	(Romania) Marian Mihail	Resigned	April 21, 2024	7th	(Spain) Ramon Tribulietx	May 1, 2024
DB Garelli United	(Philippines) Joel Villarino	Mutual consent	May 1, 2024	13th	(Philippines) Karl Claudio	May 1, 2024
Manila Montet	(Philippines) Dennis Balbin	Resigned	May 22, 2024	15th	(Philippines) Kenneth Arnaldo	May 29, 2024
Mendiola 1991	(Philippines) Christopher Pedimonte	Undisclosed	July 2024	10th	(Philippines) Dan Padernal	July 7, 2024

== Foreign players ==
Players name in bold indicates the player was registered during the mid-season transfer window.

Club	Players							Former players^{1}
Davao Aguilas	(Democratic Republic of the Congo) Gary Epesso	(Ivory Coast) Yohann Fofana	(Ivory Coast) Dosso Lancine	(South Korea) Mun Jun-su	(South Korea) Mun Te-su	(Senegal) Ibrahima Ndour	(Japan) So Omae	
Davao Aguilas	(Ivory Coast) Dini Ouattara	(Japan) Shoma Sato	(Japan) Yusuke Unoki					
DB Garelli United	(Liberia) Jangobah Johnson	(Ivory Coast) Jules Koumoin	(Brazil) Leandro	(Ghana) Solomon Obu	(Nigeria) Bode Solomon			
Dynamic Herb Cebu	(Netherlands) Yusuf Çekiç	(Turkey) Göktuğ Demiroğlu	(Japan) Rintaro Hama	(Suriname) Zamoranho Ho-A-Tham	(Ivory Coast) Marius Kore	(Netherlands) Guytho Mijland	(Senegal) Abou Sy	
Dynamic Herb Cebu	(Turkey) Devrim Yanık							
Kaya–Iloilo	(Spain) Walid Birrou	(Ghana) Eric Esso	(Japan) Shuto Komaki	(Mali) Bandiougou Konate	(South Korea) Lee Do-kyung	(Senegal) Robert Lopez Mendy	(South Korea) Park Yi-young	
Kaya–Iloilo	(Japan) Akito Saito	(Japan) Kaishu Yamazaki						
Loyola	(Ghana) Isaac Acheampong	(Ghana) Mohammed Ali	(Ghana) Isaac Annan	(Ivory Coast) **Franck Anoh**	(Ghana) David Asare	(Japan) Takaya Harada	(Cameroon) Boris Kante	
Loyola	(South Korea) Kim Sung-min	(Japan) Daisuke Kobayashi	(Ghana) Emmanuel Osei	(Ivory Coast) Ousmane Sidibé	(Senegal) Alassane Wade			
Maharlika Taguig	(England) Gael Basana	(Morocco) Soufiane Bouazzaoui	(Togo) Mikailou Djibrila	(United States) Jack Gold	(The Gambia) Ousman Jeng	(France) Junior Mailly	(Japan) Yoshio Nakamoto	
Maharlika Taguig	(Cameroon) Victor Nkoa	(Nigeria) Emmanuel Otuyemi	(Senegal) Mamadou Sene					
Manila Digger	(Ghana) Daniel Ashley	(China) Diao Su	(Japan) Daiki Jahana	(The Gambia) Salifu Jatta	(South Korea) Jeon Sang-cheon	(Japan) Yuya Kuriyama	(China) Liu Mengyang	
Manila Digger	(Ghana) Yussif Mubarik	(South Korea) Shin Min-ki	(Nigeria) Ifeanyi Ugwu	(China) Sha Shuo				
Manila Montet	No foreign players registered							
Mendiola 1991	(Lebanon) Ali Ghamloush	(Iran) Hamed Hajimehdi	(Japan) Hiromasa Ishikawa	(Japan) **Hayato Kame**	(Iran) Sajad Mohebizadeh	(Japan) Yusuke Nitta	(Ghana) **David Yeboah**	
One Taguig	(Iran) Milad Behgandom	(Sudan) Izzeldin Elhabib	(Japan) Naoto Hiraishi	(Iran) Taher Jahanbakhsh	(Japan) Tsukasa Shimomura	(Nigeria) Ilemona Usman		
Philippine Air Force	No foreign players registered							
Philippine Army	No foreign players registered							
Stallion Laguna	(Argentina) Ezequiel Cirigliano	(United States) Alfredo Cortez	(Brazil) Magson Dourado	(United States) **Pancho Gomez**	(Japan) Aoi Isami	(Argentina) Cristian Ivanobski	(Cameroon) Junior Ngong Sam	(Japan) Hayato Kame (Ghana) David Yeboah
Stallion Laguna	(Brazil) Leonardo Nogueira	(United States) Abraham Placito	(United States) Jesús Salazar	(Brazil) Gabriel Silva	(United States) Julian Stifano	(Brazil) Théo	(Mexico) Juan Trujillo	(Japan) Hayato Kame (Ghana) David Yeboah
Tuloy	(Northern Mariana Islands) Jerald Aquino	(Northern Mariana Islands) Dev Bachani						
United City	(Cameroon) Henri Bandeken	(Ivory Coast) Koffi Bini	(Cameroon) Darlton Digha	(Cameroon) Serge Kaole	(Sierra Leone) John Kamara	(Cameroon) Ariel Ngueukam	(Indonesia) Nurhidayat	
United City	(Argentina) Ricardo Sendra	(Canada) Matt Silva	(Cameroon) James Sunday					

- **^1** Former players only include players who left after the start of the 2024 season.

Foreign players by confederation
AFC	China (1), Indonesia (1), Iran (4), Japan (18), Lebanon (1), South Korea (7), Northern Mariana Islands (2)
CAF	Cameroon (8), Democratic Republic of the Congo (1), The Gambia (2), Ghana (10), Ivory Coast (8), Liberia (1), Mali (1), Morocco (1), Nigeria (4), Senegal (5), Sierra Leone (1), Sudan (1), Togo (1)
CONCACAF	Canada (1), Mexico (1), Suriname (1), United States (6)
CONMEBOL	Argentina (3), Brazil (5)
UEFA	England (1), France (1), Netherlands (2), Spain (1), Turkey (2)

== League table ==
Pos	Team	Pld	W	D	L	GF	GA	GD	Pts	Qualification
1	Kaya–Iloilo (Note: Assured a place in the AFC Champions League Two Group stage as 2023 Copa Paulino Alcantara Winners) (C)	14	13	1	0	82	5	+77	40	Qualification for 2024–25 AFC Champions League Two Group stage
2	Dynamic Herb Cebu	14	12	0	2	66	9	+57	36	Qualification for 2024–25 AFC Champions League Two Group stage
3	Stallion Laguna	14	10	2	2	65	12	+53	32	
4	Davao Aguilas	14	10	2	2	39	6	+33	32	
5	One Taguig	14	9	4	1	69	14	+55	31	
6	United City	14	9	3	2	51	13	+38	30	
7	Manila Digger	14	8	0	6	35	25	+10	24	
8	Loyola	14	5	1	8	32	45	−13	16	
9	Maharlika Taguig	14	5	1	8	23	53	−30	16	
10	Mendiola 1991	14	4	1	9	27	46	−19	13	
11	DB Garelli United	14	4	0	10	15	85	−70	12	
12	Tuloy	14	3	0	11	28	52	−24	9	
13	Philippine Air Force	14	3	0	11	19	59	−40	9	
14	Philippine Army	14	2	1	11	15	42	−27	7	
15	Manila Montet	14	0	0	14	3	103	−100	0	

Source: PFL
Rules for classification: 1) Points; 2) Goal difference; 3) Goals scored.
(C) Champions

== Positions by round ==
Team ╲ Round	1	2	3	4	5	6	7	8	9	10	11	12	13	14
Stallion Laguna	1	2	1	1	2	5	4	3	3	3	3	3	3	3
Kaya–Iloilo	5	1	2	3	3	1	1	1	1	1	1	1	1	1
One Taguig	4	3	4	4	7	7	7	6	6	5	5	6	5	5
Davao Aguilas	8	6	5	2	1	2	2	4	4	4	4	4	4	4
Manila Digger	6	5	7	7	6	6	6	7	8	9	7	7	7	7
Dynamic Herb Cebu	3	4	3	5	4	3	3	2	2	2	2	2	2	2
United City	11	10	6	6	5	4	5	5	5	6	6	5	6	6
Mendiola 1991	1	7	8	8	8	10	10	10	10	11	11	10	10	10
Maharlika Taguig	6	9	11	12	11	9	9	9	9	8	9	9	8	9
Tuloy	9	8	9	9	10	11	11	11	12	12	13	13	11	12
Loyola	13	13	10	10	9	8	8	8	7	7	8	8	9	8
Philippine Air Force	14	14	14	11	12	12	13	13	13	14	14	14	12	13
DB Garelli United	14	15	12	13	13	13	12	14	14	13	10	11	13	11
Philippine Army	9	11	13	14	14	14	14	12	11	10	12	12	14	14
Manila Montet	12	12	15	15	15	15	15	15	15	15	15	15	15	15

Updated to match(es) played on 10 July 2024. Source: PFL

== Results by round ==
Team ╲ Round	1	2	3	4	5	6	7	8	9	10	11	12	13	14
Davao Aguilas	W	W	W	W	W	D	W	W	L	D	W	W	L	W
DB Garelli United	L	L	W	L	L	L	L	L	L	W	W	L	L	W
Dynamic Herb Cebu	W	W	W	L	W	W	W	W	W	W	W	W	L	W
Kaya–Iloilo	W	W	W	D	W	W	W	W	W	W	W	W	W	W
Loyola	L	L	W	L	W	W	W	L	D	W	L	L	L	L
Maharlika Taguig	W	L	L	L	W	W	L	W	D	W	L	L	L	L
Manila Digger	W	W	L	W	W	L	W	L	L	W	W	W	L	W
Manila Montet	L	L	L	L	L	L	L	L	L	L	L	L	L	L
Mendiola 1991	W	L	L	L	W	D	L	L	L	L	L	W	W	L
One Taguig	W	W	W	D	D	L	D	W	W	W	W	D	W	W
Philippine Air Force	L	L	L	W	L	L	L	L	L	L	L	W	W	L
Philippine Army	L	L	L	L	L	D	L	W	W	L	L	L	L	L
Stallion Laguna	W	W	W	W	D	L	W	W	D	W	W	W	L	W
Tuloy	L	W	L	L	W	L	L	L	L	L	L	L	W	L
United City	L	W	W	W	W	W	L	D	W	D	W	W	D	W

Updated to match(es) played on 7 July 2024. Source: PFL
W = Win; D = Draw; L = Loss

== Results ==
Home \ Away	DAV	DBGU	DHC	KAY	LFC	MAH	MAD	MMF	MEN	TAG	PAF	PAR	STA	TFC	UCC
Davao Aguilas	—	4–0	0–1	0–1	3–0	8–0	1–0	6–0	1–0	1–1	5–2	5–0	1–0	3–1	0–0
DB Garelli United	0–5	—	2–16	0–12	—	—	0–7	4–0	4–2	—	1–0	—	0–7	1–4	—
Dynamic Herb Cebu	2–0	16–2	—	—	5–0	10–0	—	7–0	—	—	4–0	4–0	1–2	—	2–1
Kaya–Iloilo	1–0	—	1–0	—	—	—	3–1	—	9–1	—	9–0	6–0	3–2	9–0	—
Loyola	—	5–1	—	0–3	—	—	—	8–0	4–1	1–7	5–1	—	—	—	0–6
Maharlika Taguig	—	3–1	—	1–10	2–2	—	—	5–0	0–1	—	4–2	—	0–3	—	2–9
Manila Digger	—	—	0–1	—	3–1	2–1	—	—	—	0–3	—	3–2	—	—	2–4
Manila Montet	0–6	0–4	0–7	0–14	0–8	0–5	2–8	—	0–6	1–4	0–8	0–5	0–13	0–5	0–10
Mendiola 1991	—	—	1–5	—	—	—	2–3	—	—	1–9	—	0–0	—	4–2	—
One Taguig	—	17–0	1–3	0–0	—	3–1	—	—	—	—	8–0	—	—	6–1	—
Philippine Air Force	2–5	—	—	—	—	—	1–2	—	0–7	—	—	2–0	—	2–1	1–4
Philippine Army	0–5	0–1	—	—	3–4	1–1	—	5–0	—	0–5	—	—	—	—	1–3
Stallion Laguna	—	—	—	—	5–0	—	2–1	13–0	6–1	3–3	8–0	6–0	—	7–1	—
Tuloy	1–3	—	1–7	—	6–2	2–3	2–3	—	—	—	—	2–4	—	—	—
United City	0–0	7–0	—	0–2	—	—	—	10–0	3–0	2–2	—	—	1–1	1–0	—

Source: PFL
Legend: Blue = home team win; Yellow = draw; Red = away team win.
For upcoming matches, an "a" indicates there is an article about the rivalry between the two participants.

== Season statistics ==
=== Scoring ===
==== Top goalscorers ====
As of 14 July 2024

Rank	Player	Club	Goals
1	(Philippines) Jarvey Gayoso	Kaya–Iloilo	23
2	(Japan) Tsukasa Shimomura	One Taguig	21
3	(Philippines) Griffin McDaniel	Stallion Laguna	17
4	(Cameroon) Ariel Ngueukam	United City	14
5	(Argentina) Ricardo Sendra	United City	13
6	(Japan) Naoto Hiraishi	One Taguig	11
6	(Suriname) Zamoranho Ho-A-Tham	Dynamic Herb Cebu	11
6	(Mexico) Juan Trujillo	Stallion Laguna	11
6	(Japan) Yusuke Unoki	Davao Aguilas	11
10	(Brazil) Magson Dourado	Stallion Laguna	10
10	(Japan) Shuto Komaki	Kaya–Iloilo	10
10	(Japan) Rintaro Hama	Dynamic Herb Cebu	10
10	(Senegal) Ibrahima Ndour	Davao Aguilas	10

==== Top assists ====
As of 14 July 2024

Rank	Player	Club	Assists
1	(Philippines) Stephan Schröck	One Taguig	17
2	(Netherlands) Guytho Mijland	Dynamic Herb Cebu	15
3	(Brazil) Théo	Stallion Laguna	12
4	(Philippines) Paolo Bugas	United City	10
4	(Philippines) Jesus Melliza	Kaya–Iloilo	10
4	(Philippines) Kart Talaroc	Davao Aguilas	10
7	(Philippines) Mark Hartmann	United City	9
7	(Suriname) Zamoranho Ho-A-Tham	Dynamic Herb Cebu	9
7	(Mexico) Juan Trujillo	Stallion Laguna	9
10	(Philippines) Jovin Bedic	Kaya–Iloilo	8
10	(Japan) Naoto Hiraishi	One Taguig	8
10	(Japan) Shuto Komaki	Kaya–Iloilo	8
10	(United States) Abraham Placito	Stallion Laguna	8
10	(Philippines) Yannick Tuason	One Taguig	8

==== Own goals ====
As of 13 July 2024

Rank	Player	Club	Own goals
1	(Philippines) Antonio Albor	Philippine Air Force	1
1	(Ghana) Isaac Annan	Loyola	1
1	(Philippines) Neil Dorimon	Philippine Army	1
1	(Philippines) Keith Edulan	Mendiola 1991	1
1	(Nigeria) Bode Solomon	DB Garelli United	1
1	(Ghana) David Yeboah	Mendiola 1991	1

=== Hat-tricks ===
As of 13 July 2024

Player	Club	Result	Against	Date
(Iran) Sajad Mohebizadeh	Mendiola 1991	7–0 (A)	Philippine Air Force	6 April 2024
(Japan) Tsukasa Shimomura^{4}	One Taguig	8–0 (H)	Philippine Air Force	13 April 2024
(Philippines) Jarvey Gayoso^{4}	Kaya–Iloilo	12–0 (A)	DB Garelli United	13 April 2024
(Ivory Coast) Jules Koumoin	DB Garelli United	4–2 (H)	Mendiola 1991	20 April 2024
(Philippines) Griffin McDaniel^{5}	Stallion Laguna	13–0 (H)	Manila Montet	21 April 2024
(Brazil) Magson Dourado	Stallion Laguna	13–0 (H)	Manila Montet	21 April 2024
(Japan) Shuto Komaki	Kaya–Iloilo	10–1 (A)	Maharlika Taguig	21 April 2024
(Netherlands) Guytho Mijland	Dynamic Herb Cebu	10–0 (H)	Maharlika Taguig	27 April 2024
(Senegal) Ibrahima Ndour	Davao Aguilas	6–0 (H)	Manila Montet	28 April 2024
(Philippines) Griffin McDaniel	Stallion Laguna	6–0 (H)	Philippine Army	28 April 2024
(Philippines) Jon Nebreja	Mendiola 1991	6–0 (A)	Manila Montet	3 May 2024
(Philippines) Jarvey Gayoso^{4}	Kaya–Iloilo	9–0 (H)	Philippine Air Force	8 May 2024
(Cameroon) Ariel Ngueukam	United City	4–2 (A)	Manila Digger	11 May 2024
(France) Junior Mailly	Maharlika Taguig	3–1 (H)	DB Garelli United	18 May 2024
(Mexico) Juan Trujillo	Stallion Laguna	6–1 (H)	Mendiola 1991	18 May 2024
(Philippines) Jarvey Gayoso^{7}	Kaya–Iloilo	9–0 (H)	Tuloy	29 May 2024
(Suriname) Zamoranho Ho-A-Tham	Dynamic Herb Cebu	16–2 (H)	DB Garelli United	1 June 2024
(Senegal) Abou Sy	Dynamic Herb Cebu	16–2 (H)	DB Garelli United	1 June 2024
(Japan) Tsukasa Shimomura	One Taguig	9–1 (A)	Mendiola 1991	1 June 2024
(Mexico) Juan Trujillo^{4}	Stallion Laguna	8–0 (H)	Philippine Air Force	8 June 2024
(South Korea) Lee Do-kyung^{4}	Kaya Iloilo	14–0 (A)	Manila Montet	15 June 2024
(Philippines) Martini Rey^{4}	Kaya Iloilo	14–0 (A)	Manila Montet	15 June 2024
(Argentina) Ricardo Sendra	United City	3–0 (H)	Mendiola 1991	22 June 2024
(Japan) Tsukasa Shimomura^{6}	One Taguig	17–0 (H)	DB Garelli United	29 June 2024
(Iran) Taher Jahanbakhsh	One Taguig	17–0 (H)	DB Garelli United	29 June 2024
(Japan) Naoto Hiraishi	One Taguig	17–0 (H)	DB Garelli United	29 June 2024
(Suriname) Zamoranho Ho-A-Tham	Dynamic Herb Cebu	4–0 (H)	Philippine Army	29 June 2024
(Iran) Hamed Hajimehdi	Mendiola 1991	4–2 (H)	Tuloy	29 June 2024
(Philippines) Jed Delariarte	Philippine Air Force	8–0 (A)	Manila Montet	29 June 2024
(Japan) Yusuke Unoki	Davao Aguilas	8–0 (H)	Maharlika Taguig	30 June 2024
(South Korea) Jeon Sang-cheon	Manila Digger	7–0 (A)	DB Garelli United	6 July 2024
(The Gambia) Salifu Jatta	Manila Digger	8–2 (A)	Manila Montet	13 July 2024
(China) Su Diao	Manila Digger	8–2 (A)	Manila Montet	13 July 2024
(Cameroon) Ariel Ngueukam	United City	9–2 (A)	Maharlika Taguig	13 July 2024
(Argentina) Ricardo Sendra	United City	9–2 (A)	Maharlika Taguig	13 July 2024
(Iran) Taher Jahanbakhsh	One Taguig	6–1 (H)	Tuloy	14 July 2024

Note

(H) – Home; (A) – Away

^{4} Player scored four goals
^{5} Player scored five goals
^{6} Player scored six goals
^{7} Player scored seven goals

=== Clean sheets ===
As of 13 July 2024

Rank	Player	Club	Clean sheets
1	(Ivory Coast) Dini Ouattara	Davao Aguilas	9
2	(Spain) Walid Birrou	Kaya–Iloilo	7
3	(Cameroon) Henri Bandeken	United City	6
3	(United States) Alfredo Cortez	Stallion Laguna	6
5	(Philippines) Florencio Badelic Jr.	Dynamic Herb Cebu	5
6	(Philippines) Quincy Kammeraad	One Taguig	4
6	(Philippines) John Misagal	DB Garelli United	4
8	(Philippines) Kenry Balobo	Kaya–Iloilo	3
8	(Philippines) Mark Bedia	Philippine Army	3
8	(Netherlands) Yusuf Çekıç	Dynamic Herb Cebu	3

=== Discipline ===
==== Red cards ====
As of 13 July 2024

Rank	Player	Team	Red cards
1	(Philippines) Jimuel Ariola	Philippine Army	2
1	(Cameroon) Victor Nkoa	Maharlika Taguig	2
3	(Philippines) Paolo Alovera	DB Garelli United	1
3	(Philippines) Amir Aningalan	Mendiola 1991	1
3	(Philippines) Abrielle Belgira	Philippine Army	1
3	(Netherlands) Yusuf Çekıç	Dynamic Herb Cebu	1
3	(Philippines) John Celiz	Philippine Army	1
3	(Philippines) OJ Clarino	Davao Aguilas	1
3	(Cameroon) Darlton Digha	United City	1
3	(Philippines) Joshua Jalog	Manila Digger	1
3	(Philippines) Kevin Ingreso	One Taguig	1
3	(Cameroon) Boris Kante	Loyola	1
3	(Philippines) Audie Menzi	Kaya–Iloilo	1
3	(Japan) So Omae	Davao Aguilas	1
3	(Philippines) Daisuke Sato	Davao Aguilas	1
3	(Japan) Shoma Sato	Dabao Aguilas	1
3	(Japan) Tsukasa Shimomura	One Taguig	1
3	(Philippines) Jacob Tañamor	Mendiola 1991	1
3	(Philippines) Theodore Travis	Loyola	1
