= List of Philippines Football League goalscorers =

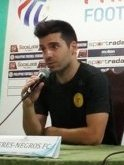
Bienvenido Marañón is the highest-scoring player, scoring 74 goals in only 54 matches for Ceres–Negros.

Since the foundation of the Philippines Football League in 2017, there have been 1033 goals scored in the four seasons of the Philippines Football League. Ceres–Negros and United City striker Bienvenido Marañón has the most goals with 74, with Kaya–Iloilo forwards Jordan Mintah and Robert Lopez Mendy in second and third with 56 and 49 goals, respectively. 8 different players have scored in every single PFL season so far, with three players winning the Golden Boot. Chima Uzoka and Takashi Odawara hold the record for most clubs scored for, having scored for four different clubs across four seasons. Meanwhile, Mintah also holds the record for most goals scored in a single season, scoring 31 during the 2019 season.

== Top goalscorers (all time) ==
Key

- **Bold** shows players still playing in the PFL.
- Italics show players still playing professional football in other leagues.
- The list of teams for individual players include all teams that they have scored for.

As of matches played on 29 March 2026

All-time top goalscorers
Rank	Player	2017	2018	2019	2020	2022–23	2024	2024–25	2025–26	Total	Club(s) (goals scored)
1	(Spain) (Philippines) Bienvenido Marañón (Note: Initially played in the PFL as a foreign import, but was granted Philippine Citizenship in 2021.)	22	15	30	7	–	–	–	–	74	Ceres–Negros (67), United City (7)
2	(Senegal) Robert Lopez Mendy	9	18	17	5	5	7	7	–	68	Kaya–Iloilo (42), Ceres–Negros (22), Davao Aguilas (4)
3	(Philippines) **Jesus Melliza**	13	8	11	1	7	7	6	7	60	Stallion Laguna (33), Kaya–Iloilo (27)
4	(Ghana) Jordan Mintah	18	7	31	–	–	–	–	–	56	Kaya–Iloilo (56)
5	(Philippines) **Griffin McDaniel**	–	–	–	–	5	17	11	22	55	Stallion Laguna (55)
6	(Senegal) **Abou Sy**	–	6	8	–	3	9	10	6	42	Stallion Laguna (17), Dynamic Herb Cebu (25)
7	(Philippines) **Mike Ott**	–	9	14	6	–	–	–	11	40	Ceres–Negros (23), United City (6), Kaya–Iloilo (11)
8	(Philippines) Jarvey Gayoso	–	–	–	4	12	23	–	–	39	ADT (4), Kaya–Iloilo (35)
9	(Philippines) **Jovin Bedic**	4	9	4	1	4	3	3	4	32	Kaya–Iloilo (32)
10	(The Gambia) **Ousman Gai**	–	–	–	–	–	–	10	21	31	Manila Digger (31)
10	(Philippines) Chima Uzoka	8	–	4	2	7	6	–	4	31	Ilocos United (8), Stallion Laguna (3), Global Makati (1), ADT (2), Dynamic Herb Cebu (13), Maharlika (4)
12	(The Gambia) **Saikou Ceesay**	–	–	–	–	–	–	16	14	30	Manila Digger (30)
13	(Philippines) **Patrick Reichelt**	5	7	–	–	–	–	–	17	29	Ceres–Negros (12), One Taguig (17)
13	(Japan) Tsukasa Shimomura	–	–	–	–	–	21	8	–	29	One Taguig (29)
15	(Argentina) **Ricardo Sendra**	–	–	3	–	5	13	3	3	27	Mendiola 1991 (3), United City (18), Stallion Laguna (6)
16	(Philippines) **Fitch Arboleda**	6	7	9	–	1	–	2	1	26	Stallion Laguna (22), Kaya–Iloilo (4)
17	(Japan) **Shuto Komaki**	–	–	–	–	–	10	11	4	25	Kaya–Iloilo (25)
17	(Philippines) **Stephan Schröck**	8	6	5	1	2	–	1	2	25	Ceres–Negros (19), United City (1), ADT (2), Stallion Laguna (2), One Taguig (1)
19	(Philippines) Phil Younghusband	10	13	–	–	–	–	–	–	23	Meralco Manila (6), Davao Aguilas (17)
20	(Cameroon) Junior Ngong Sam	–	–	–	–	6	9	7	–	22	Mendiola 1991 (6), Stallion Laguna (9), One Taguig (7)
20	(Philippines) OJ Porteria	5	6	6	4	–	–	1	–	22	Ceres–Negros (17), United City (4), Stallion Laguna (1)
20	(Mexico) **Juan Trujillo**	–	–	–	–	2	11	5	4	22	Stallion Laguna (22)

== Top goalscorers (per club) ==
As of matches played on 29 March 2026

Top goalscorer per club
Team	Player	Goals	Apps	Ratio
Aguilas–UMak	(Philippines) Phil Younghusband	17	31	0.55
Azkals Development Team	(Philippines) Andres Aldeguer	5	13	0.38
Don Bosco Garelli	(Ivory Coast) Jules Koumoin	7	11	0.64
Ceres–Negros	(Spain) (Philippines) Bienvenido Marañón	67	54	1.24
Dynamic Herb Cebu	(Senegal) Abou Sy	25	44	0.57
Global Cebu	(Trinidad and Tobago) Darryl Roberts	15	34	0.44
Green Archers United	(Ghana) Stephen Appiah	7	13	0.54
Ilocos United	(Philippines) Chima Uzoka	8	18	0.44
JPV Marikina	(Japan) Takumi Uesato	16	19	0.84
Kaya–Iloilo	(Ghana) Jordan Mintah	56	54	1.04
Loyola	(Philippines) Rico Andes	9	14	0.64
Maharlika	(France) Junior Mailly	7	14	0.50
Manila Digger	(The Gambia) Ousman Gai	31	30	1.03
Manila Montet	(Philippines) Mark Ordiz	2	9	0.22
One Taguig	(Japan) Tsukasa Shimomura	29	30	0.97
Philippine Air Force	(Philippines) Jed Delariarte	6	14	0.43
Philippine Army	(Philippines) Jimuel Ariola	8	22	2.75
Stallion Laguna	(Philippines) Griffin McDaniel	55	63	0.87
Tuloy	(Philippines) John Lloyd Jalique	16	29	0.55
United City	(Argentina) Ricardo Sendra	18	24	0.75
Valenzuela PB–Mendiola	(Iran) Hamed Hajimehdi	14	53	0.26

== Top goalscorers (per season) ==
=== 2017 Season ===
Rank	Player	Team	Goals
1	(Spain) Bienvenido Marañón	Ceres–Negros	22
2	(Spain) Fernando Rodríguez	Ceres–Negros	21
3	(Ghana) Jordan Mintah	Kaya–Makati	18
4	(Japan) Takumi Uesato	JPV Marikina	16
5	(Philippines) Jesus Melliza	Stallion Laguna	13
6	(Australia) Harry Sawyer	Davao Aguilas	10
6	(Philippines) Phil Younghusband	Davao Aguilas; Meralco Manila	10
6	(Japan) Takashi Odawara	JPV Marikina	10
6	(Philippines) Iain Ramsay	Ceres–Negros	10
10	(Senegal) Robert Lopez Mendy	Kaya–Makati	9
10	(Philippines) James Younghusband	Davao Aguilas; Meralco Manila	9
10	(Spain) Rufo Sanchez	Global Cebu	9

=== 2018 Season ===
Rank	Player	Club	Goals
1	(Senegal) Robert Lopez Mendy	Kaya–Iloilo	18
2	(Spain) Bienvenido Marañón	Ceres–Negros	15
3	(Philippines) Phil Younghusband	Davao Aguilas	13
4	(Japan) Keigo Moriyasu	JPV Marikina	11
5	(Philippines) James Younghusband	Davao Aguilas	10
6	(Switzerland) Carlo Polli	Stallion Laguna	9
6	(Philippines) Jovin Bedic	Kaya–Iloilo	9
6	(Philippines) Mike Ott	Ceres–Negros	9
9	(Philippines) Jesus Melliza	Stallion Laguna	8
9	(Philippines) J Baguioro	JPV Marikina	8
9	(South Korea) Kim Sung-Min	Davao Aguilas	8

=== 2019 Season ===
Rank	Player	Club	Goals
1	(Ghana) Jordan Mintah	Kaya–Iloilo	31
2	(Spain) Bienve Marañón	Ceres–Negros	30
3	(Senegal) Robert Lopez Mendy	Ceres–Negros	17
4	(Philippines) Mike Ott	Ceres–Negros	14
5	(Philippines) Jesus Melliza	Stallion Laguna	11
6	(Philippines) Ashley Flores	Mendiola 1991	9
6	(Philippines) Fitch Arboleda	Stallion Laguna	9
8	(Senegal) Abou Sy	Stallion Laguna	8
9	(Philippines) John Celiz	Green Archers United	7
9	(Ghana) Stephen Appiah	Green Archers United	7

=== 2020 Season ===
Rank	Player	Club	Goals
1	(Spain) Bienvenido Marañón	United City	7
2	(Philippines) Mike Ott	United City	6
3	(Senegal) Robert Lopez Mendy	United City	5
4	(Philippines) Javier Gayoso	ADT	4
4	(Philippines) OJ Porteria	United City	4
6	(Philippines) Kenshiro Daniels	Kaya–Iloilo	2
6	(Senegal) Ibrahima N'Dour	Stallion Laguna	2
6	(Philippines) Chima Uzoka	ADT	2

== Hat tricks ==
Player	Club	Result	Against	Date	Ref
(Japan) Takumi Uesato	JPV Marikina	4–0 (A)	Stallion Laguna	31 May 2017	
(Spain) Bienvenido Marañón	Ceres–Negros	3–1 (H)	Kaya–Makati	24 June 2017	
(Spain) Fernando Rodríguez	Ceres–Negros	5–1 (H)	Stallion Laguna	28 June 2017	
(Philippines) Iain Ramsay	Ceres–Negros	7–0 (A)	Meralco Manila	15 July 2017	
(Ghana) Jordan Mintah	Kaya–Makati	5–2 (H)	Ilocos United	19 July 2017	
(Japan) Takumi Uesato^{4}	JPV Marikina	5–2 (H)	Global Cebu	13 August 2017	
(Philippines) Jesus Melliza^{4}	Stallion Laguna	5–0 (H)	Ilocos United	10 September 2017	
(Australia) Harry Sawyer	Davao Aguilas	4–2 (A)	Ilocos United	18 October 2017	
(Spain) Rufo Sánchez	Global Cebu	4–3 (H)	Stallion Laguna	2 November 2017	
(Spain) Fernando Rodríguez	Ceres–Negros	5–1 (H)	Davao Aguilas	2 November 2017	
(Spain) Fernando Rodríguez	Ceres–Negros	6–0 (H)	Meralco Manila	5 November 2017	
(Japan) Takumi Uesato	JPV Marikina	6–3 (H)	Davao Aguilas	21 November 2017	
(Philippines) Iain Ramsay	Ceres–Negros	4–1 (H)	Global Cebu	16 December 2017	
(Ghana) Jordan Mintah	Kaya–Iloilo	4–1 (A)	JPV Marikina	5 May 2018	
(Senegal) Robert Lopez Mendy	Kaya–Iloilo	4–2 (H)	Davao Aguilas	20 May 2018	
(Senegal) Robert Lopez Mendy	Kaya–Iloilo	4–2 (H)	JPV Marikina	27 June 2018	
(Philippines) Jovin Bedic	Kaya–Iloilo	4–2 (H)	Stallion Laguna	4 July 2018	
(Spain) Bienvenido Marañón	Ceres–Negros	6–1 (H)	Global Cebu	25 July 2018	
(Japan) Keigo Moriyasu	JPV Marikina	11–1 (A)	Global Cebu	1 August 2018	
(Philippines) Jay Baguioro	JPV Marikina	11–1 (A)	Global Cebu	1 August 2018	
(Ghana) Jordan Mintah	Kaya–Iloilo	4–0 (H)	Green Archers United	25 May 2019	
(Spain) Bienvenido Marañón	Ceres–Negros	5–0 (A)	Philippine Air Force	29 May 2019	
(Spain) Bienvenido Marañón^{4}	Ceres–Negros	8–0 (A)	Global Cebu	1 June 2019	
(Philippines) Chima Uzoka	Stallion Laguna	6–1 (H)	Mendiola 1991	15 June 2019	
(Ghana) Jordan Mintah	Kaya–Iloilo	6–3 (A)	Mendiola 1991	19 June 2019	
(Philippines) Jimuel Ariola	Green Archers United	3–4 (H)	Ceres–Negros	3 July 2019	
(Spain) Bienvenido Marañón	Ceres–Negros	12–0 (H)	Philippine Air Force	13 July 2019	
(Philippines) Stephan Schröck	Ceres–Negros	12–0 (H)	Philippine Air Force	13 July 2019	
(Philippines) Mike Ott^{4}	Ceres–Negros	12–0 (H)	Philippine Air Force	13 July 2019	
(Philippines) John Celiz^{4}	Green Archers United	9–0 (A)	Global Cebu	14 July 2019	
(Philippines) Ashley Flores	Mendiola 1991	5–2 (A)	Green Archers United	24 July 2019	
(Ghana) Jordan Mintah	Kaya–Iloilo	5–0 (H)	Mendiola 1991	27 July 2019	
(Senegal) Robert Lopez Mendy^{4}	Ceres-Negros	5–2 (A)	Mendiola 1991	10 August 2019	
(Senegal) Robert Lopez Mendy	Ceres-Negros	13–0 (A)	Global Cebu	28 August 2019	
(Spain) Bienvenido Marañón^{4}	Ceres-Negros	13–0 (A)	Global Cebu	28 August 2019	
(Philippines) Mike Ott	Ceres-Negros	13–0 (A)	Global Cebu	28 August 2019	
(Philippines) Fitch Arboleda	Stallion Laguna	7–0 (A)	Green Archers United	31 August 2019	
(Ghana) Jordan Mintah	Kaya–Iloilo	5–1 (H)	Global Cebu	7 September 2019	
(Senegal) Robert Lopez Mendy	Ceres-Negros	7–0 (H)	Philippine Air Force	14 September 2019	
(Ghana) Jordan Mintah^{4}	Kaya–Iloilo	5–0 (H)	Philippine Air Force	25 September 2019	
(Philippines) Jesus Melliza	Stallion Laguna	9–1 (H)	Global Cebu	25 September 2019	
(Philippines) Jesus Melliza	Stallion Laguna	4–1 (H)	Philippine Air Force	4 October 2019	
(Ghana) Jordan Mintah^{4}	Kaya–Iloilo	5–1 (H)	Mendiola 1991	9 October 2019	
(Spain) Bienvenido Marañón	United City	6–0 (A)	Mendiola 1991	October 31, 2020	
(Senegal) Robert Lopez Mendy	United City	10–0 (A)	Maharlika Manila	November 3, 2020	
(Philippines) OJ Porteria	United City	10–0 (A)	Maharlika Manila	November 3, 2020	
(Spain) Bienvenido Marañón	United City	10–0 (A)	Maharlika Manila	November 3, 2020	

Note

(H) – Home; (A) – Away

^{4} Player scored four goals
