= Philippines Football League records and statistics =

The Philippines Football League is the top-tier league of Philippine football. The following page details the football records and statistics of the PFL.

== League records ==
=== Titles ===
- Most titles: 4, Ceres–Negros/United City
- Most consecutive title wins: 4, Ceres–Negros/United City, (2017, 2018, 2019, 2020)
- Biggest title-winning margin: 12 points, 2019; Ceres–Negros (68 points) over Kaya–Iloilo (56 points)
- Smallest title-winning margin: 1 point, 2020; United City (12 points) over Kaya–Iloilo (11 points)

=== Points ===
- Most points in a season: 68, Ceres–Negros (2019)
- Most home points in a season: 40, Ceres–Negros (2017)
- Most away points in a season: 34, Ceres–Negros (2019)
- Most points without winning the league: 61, Meralco Manila (2017)
- Fewest points in a season: 0, Manila Montet (2024)
- Fewest home points in a season: 0, Manila Montet (2024)
- Fewest away points in a season: 0, Manila Montet (2024)
- Fewest points while winning the league: 12, United City (2020)

=== Wins ===
- Most wins in total: 95, Kaya–Iloilo
- Most wins in a season: 22, Ceres–Negros (2019)
- Most home wins in a season: 12, Ceres–Negros (2017)
- Most away wins in a season: 11, Ceres–Negros (2019)
- Fewest wins in a season: 0
  - Manila Montet (2024)
  - Stallion Laguna (2020)
- Fewest home wins in a season: 0
  - Ilocos United (2017)
  - Manila Montet (2024)
  - Stallion Laguna (2020)
- Fewest away wins in a season: 0
  - Manila Montet (2024)
  - Stallion Laguna (2020)
- Most consecutive wins: 16, Ceres–Negros (2019)
- Most consecutive wins from the start of the season: 5
  - Ceres–Negros (2018)
  - Davao Aguilas (2024)
  - Kaya–Iloilo (2019, 2022–23)
  - Meralco Manila (2017)
- Most consecutive wins to the end of the season: 10, Kaya–Iloilo (2024)
- Most consecutive games without a win: 21, Global Makati (2018 – 2019)
- Most consecutive games without a win from the start of the season: 14, Manila Montet (2024)
- Most consecutive games without a win to the end of the season: 14, Manila Montet (2024)
- Defeated all league opponents at least once in a season:
  - Ceres–Negros (2017, 2018, 2019)
  - Davao Aguilas (2018)
  - Kaya–Iloilo (2018, 2022–23)
  - Meralco Manila (2017)

=== Defeats ===
- Most defeats in total: 56, Mendiola FC 1991
- Most defeats in a season: 22, Global Cebu (2018)
- Most home defeats in a season: 10, Global Cebu (2018)
- Most away defeats in a season: 12
  - Global Cebu (2018)
  - Ilocos United (2017)
- Fewest defeats in a season: 0
  - Ceres–Negros (2019)
  - Kaya–Iloilo (2024)
- Fewest home defeats in a season: 0
  - Ceres–Negros (2019)
  - Davao Aguilas (2024)
  - Kaya–Iloilo (2024)
- Fewest away defeats in a season: 0
  - Ceres–Negros (2018, 2019)
  - Dynamic Herb Cebu (2022–23)
  - Kaya–Iloilo (2024)
  - One Taguig (2024)
- Most consecutive games undefeated: 30, Ceres–Negros/United City (2018 – 2020)
- Most consecutive games undefeated from the start of the season: 24, Ceres–Negros (2019)
- Most consecutive games undefeated to the end of the season: 24, Ceres–Negros (2019)
- Most consecutive defeats: 16, Global Cebu/Global Makati (2018 – 2019)
- Most consecutive defeats from the start of the season: 14, Manila Montet (2024)
- Most consecutive defeats to the end of the season: 14, Manila Montet (2024)

=== Draws ===
- Most draws in total: 26, Stallion Laguna
- Most draws in a season: 10, Davao Aguilas (2017)
- Most home draws in a season: 6, Davao Aguilas (2017)
- Most away draws in a season: 5, Global Cebu (2017)
- Fewest draws in a season: 0
  - ADT (2020)
  - DB Garelli United (2024)
  - Dynamic Herb Cebu (2024)
  - Maharlika Manila (2020)
  - Manila Digger (2024)
  - Manila Montet (2024)
  - Mendiola 1991 (2022–23)
  - Philippine Air Force (2024)
  - Tuloy (2024)
  - United City (2020)
- Fewest home draws in a season: 0
  - ADT (2020)
  - Ceres–Negros (2018)
  - DB Garelli United (2024)
  - Dynamic Herb Cebu (2024)
  - Kaya–Iloilo (2019)
  - Maharlika Manila (2020)
  - Manila Digger (2024)
  - Manila Montet (2024)
  - Mendiola 1991 (2022–23)
  - Philippine Air Force (2019)
  - Philippine Air Force (2024)
  - Tuloy (2024)
  - United City (2020)
- Fewest away draws in a season: 0
  - ADT (2020)
  - DB Garelli United (2024)
  - Dynamic Herb Cebu (2024)
  - JPV Marikina (2018)
  - Maharlika Manila (2020)
  - Maharlika Manila (2022–23)
  - Manila Digger (2024)
  - Manila Montet (2024)
  - Mendiola 1991 (2022–23)
  - Philippine Air Force (2024)
  - Tuloy (2024)
  - United City (2020)
- Most consecutive draws: 3, Davao Aguilas (2017)
- Most consecutive games without a draw: 29, Mendiola 1991 (2022–23 – 2024)

=== Goals ===
- Most goals scored in a season: 99, Ceres–Negros (2019)
- Fewest goals scored in a season: 2
  - Maharlika Manila (2020)
  - Mendiola 1991 (2020)
- Most goals conceded in a season: 103, Manila Montet (2024)
- Fewest goals conceded in a season: 2
  - ADT (2020)
  - Kaya–Iloilo (2020)
- Best goal difference in a season: 87, Ceres–Negros (2019)
- Worst goal difference in a season: –100, Manila Montet (2024)
- Highest finish with a negative goal difference: 4th, Mendiola 1991 (2020, –6)
- Lowest finish with a positive goal difference: 7th, Manila Digger (2024, +10)
- Most goals scored at home in a season: 41, Dynamic Herb Cebu (2024)
- Fewest goals scored at home in a season: 0
  - Maharlika Manila (2020)
  - Mendiola 1991 (2020)
- Most goals conceded at home in a season: 50, Global Makati (2019)
- Fewest goals conceded at home in a season: 0
  - ADT (2020)
  - Kaya–Iloilo (2020)
- Most goals scored away in a season: 51, Ceres–Negros (2019)
- Fewest goals scored away in a season: 0, Manila Montet (2024)
- Most goals conceded away in a season: 58, Manila Montet (2024)
- Fewest goals conceded away in a season: 0, United City (2020)
- Scored in every game:
  - Ceres–Negros (2019)
  - United City (2020)
- Most consecutive matches scored in: 42, Ceres–Negros/United City (2018 – 2022–23)
- Most goals scored in total: 351, Ceres–Negros/United City
- Most goals conceded in total: 220, Global Cebu/Global Makati

== Player records ==
=== Appearances ===
- Most appearances: 129, Jesus Melliza (6 May 2017 to 14 March 2026)
- Most different clubs played for: 9, Marvin Angeles (for Kaya–Iloilo, Global Cebu, Green Archers United, ADT, Stallion Laguna, Davao Aguilas, United City, Maharlika, Don Bosco Garelli)
- Oldest Player: Nestorio Margarse, 49 years and 10 months (for Philippine Army v. One Taguig, 25 March 2026)
- Youngest Player: Lawrence Binalong, 15 years and 8 months (for Philippine Youth National Team v. Kaya–Iloilo, 12 November 2024)

Players currently playing in the league are highlighted in bold.

Most appearances (career)
Rank	Name	Appearances	Years active	Current/Last PFL Team
1	(Philippines) **Jesus Melliza**	129	2017–	Kaya–Iloilo
2	(Philippines) Jovin Bedic	121	2017–	Kaya–Iloilo
2	(Philippines) **Marwin Angeles**	121	2017–2020, 2022–	Kaya–Iloilo
4	(Philippines) **Fitch Arboleda**	120	2017–	Kaya–Iloilo
5	(Philippines) **Matthew Nierras**	118	2017–	Stallion Laguna
6	(Philippines) **Ruben Doctora**	106	2017–2020, 2022–2025	Valenzuela PB–Mendiola
7	(Philippines) **Reynald Villareal**	102	2017–	Davao Aguilas
8	(Senegal) Robert Lopez Mendy	97	2017–2020, 2022–2025	Davao Aguilas
9	(Philippines) **Eric Giganto**	96	2017–	Maharlika
10	(Philippines) **Stephan Schröck**	95	2017–2020, 2022–	One Taguig

Foreign players with most appearances (career)
Rank	Name	Appearances	Years active	Current/Last PFL Team
1	(Senegal) Robert Lopez Mendy	97	2017–2020, 2022–2025	Davao Aguilas
2	(Senegal) **Abou Sy**	91	2018–2019, 2021–	Dynamic Herb Cebu
3	(Argentina) **Ricardo Sendra**	75	2019–	Stallion Laguna
4	(Japan) Masanari Omura	73	2017–2021	Kaya–Iloilo
5	(Iran) **Hamed Hajimehdi**	66	2019–	One Taguig
6	(Senegal) Alfred Osei	63	2017–2019	Kaya–Iloilo
7	(Ivory Coast) **Marius Koré**	60	2022–	Dynamic Herb Cebu
8	(Spain) Bienvenido Marañón^{1}	59	2017–2020	United City
9	(Mexico) **Juan Trujillo**	57	2021–	Stallion Laguna
10	(Ghana) Jordan Mintah	54	2017–2019	Kaya–Iloilo

Notes

1. Played 59 matches for his club before becoming a citizen of the Philippines through naturalization.

=== Goals ===
- First Philippines Football League goal: Curt Dizon (for Meralco Manila v. Stallion Laguna, 6 May 2017)
- Most goals: 74, Bienvenido Marañón (Ceres–Negros/United City)
- Most at one club: 74, Bienvenido Marañón (Ceres–Negros/United City)
- Most seasons scored in: 8 (2017 – 2025-26)
  - Jovin Bedic
  - Jesus Melliza
- Most goals in a season: 31, Jordan Mintah (Kaya–Iloilo, 2019)
- Most debut goals in a season: 23, Bienvenido Marañón (Ceres–Negros, 2017)
- Most different clubs to score for: 6, Chima Uzoka (for Ilocos United, Stallion Laguna, Global Makati, ADT, Dynamic Herb Cebu, Maharlika)
- Most hat tricks: 8, Bienvenido Marañón (Ceres–Negros/United City)
- Most hat tricks in a season: 5, Jordan Mintah (Kaya–Iloilo, 2019)
- Most goals in a game: 7, Jarvey Gayoso (for Kaya–Iloilo v. Tuloy, 29 May 2024) W 9–0

Players currently playing in the league are highlighted in bold.

Most goals (career)
Rank	Name	Goals	Current/Last PFL Team	Playing position	First goal	Last goal
1	(Spain) Bienvenido Marañón	74	United City	Forward	2017	2020
2	(Senegal) Robert Lopez Mendy	68	Davao Aguilas	Forward	2017	2024–25
3	(Philippines) **Jesus Melliza**	60	Kaya–Iloilo	Forward	2017	2025–26
4	(Ghana) Jordan Mintah	56	Kaya–Iloilo	Forward	2017	2019
5	(Philippines) **Griffin McDaniel**	55	Stallion Laguna	Forward	2022–23	2025–26
6	(Senegal) **Abou Sy**	42	Dynamic Herb Cebu	Forward	2018	2025–26
7	(Philippines) **Mike Ott**	40	Kaya–Iloilo	Midfielder	2018	2025–26
8	(Philippines) Jarvey Gayoso	39	Kaya–Iloilo	Forward	2020	2024
9	(Philippines) Jovin Bedic	32	Kaya–Iloilo	Forward	2017	2025–26
10	(The Gambia) **Ousman Gai**	31	Manila Digger	Midfielder	2024–25	2025–26

=== Assists ===
- Most assists: 57, Stephan Schröck (Ceres–Negros/United City, ADT)
- Most assists in one season: 21, Stephan Schröck (Ceres–Negros, 2019)
- Most assists in a single match: 5
- Guytho Mijland (for Dynamic Herb Cebu v. DB Garelli United, 1 June 2024)
- Jovin Bedic (for Kaya–Iloilo v. Manila Montet, 15 June 2024)
- Stephan Schröck (for One Taguig v. DB Garelli United, 29 June 2024)

Players currently playing in the league are highlighted in bold.

Most assists (career)
Rank	Name	Assists	Current/Last PFL Team	Playing position	First assist	Last assist
1	(Philippines) **Stephan Schröck**	67	One Taguig	Midfielder	2017	2025–26
2	(Philippines) **Jesus Melliza**	40	Kaya–Iloilo	Forward	2017	2025–26
3	(Senegal) Robert Lopez Mendy	32	Davao Aguilas	Forward	2017	2024–25
4	(Philippines) **Jovin Bedic**	27	Kaya–Iloilo	Forward	2017	2025–26
4	(Philippines) **Mark Hartmann**	27	One Taguig	Midfielder	2022–23	2025–26
4	(Mexico) **Juan Trujillo**	27	Stallion Laguna	Midfielder	2022–23	2025–26
7	(Spain) Bienvenido Marañón	28	United City	Forward	2017	2020
7	(Philippines) **Mike Ott**	28	Kaya–Iloilo	Midfielder	2018	2025–26
9	(Philippines) **Eric Giganto**	26	Maharlika	Midfielder	2017	2024–25
10	(Japan) Daizo Horikoshi	24	Kaya–Iloilo	Forward	2020	2024–25

=== Goalkeepers ===
- Most clean sheets: 19, Roland Müller (Ceres–Negros)
- Most clean sheets in one season: 10
- Roland Müller (for Ceres–Negros, 2019 Philippines Football League)
- Miloš Čupić (for One Taguig, 2025–26 Philippines Football League)
- Most clean sheets at one club: 19, Roland Müller (Ceres–Negros)

Players currently playing in the league are highlighted in bold.

Most clean sheets (career)
Rank	Name	Clean sheets	Current/Last PFL Team	First season	Last season
1	(Philippines) Jun Badelic	26	Dynamic Herb Cebu	2017	2024–25
2	(Cameroon) **Henri Bandeken**	22	One Taguig	2019	2025–26
3	(Ivory Coast) **Dini Ouattara**	21	Maharlika	2019	2025–26
4	(Philippines) Roland Müller	19	Ceres–Negros	2017	2019
5	(Philippines) **Patrick Deyto**	16	Kaya–Iloilo	2017	2025–26
6	(United States) Alfredo Cortez	15	Kaya–Iloilo	2024	2025–26
6	(Philippines) Ace Villanueva	15	Dynamic Herb Cebu	2017	2024–25
8	(Philippines) **Kenry Balobo**	14	Maharlika	2020	2025–26
9	(Philippines) Louie Casas	13	Kaya–Iloilo	2017	2020
10	(Philippines) Quincy Kammeraad	12	One Taguig	2020	2024–25

=== Disciplinary ===
- Most red cards: 4, Daniel Gadia (Meralco Manila, Dynamic Herb Cebu)

== Match records ==
=== Scorelines ===
- Biggest home win:
  - One Taguig 17–0 Don Bosco Garelli (29 June 2024)
- Biggest away win:
  - Manila Montet 0–14 Kaya–Iloilo (15 June 2024)
  - Tuloy 0–14 Manila Digger (25 March 2026)
- Biggest aggregate win:
  - Ceres–Negros 27–0 Global Makati
  - Ceres–Negros 27–0 Philippine Air Force
- Biggest loss by reigning champions:
  - Ceres–Negros 0–3 Davao Aguilas (12 August 2018)
- Highest scoring:
  - Dynamic Herb Cebu 16–2 Don Bosco Garelli (1 June 2024)
- Highest scoring draw:
  - Global Cebu 3–3 Ilocos United (15 November 2017)
  - JPV Marikina 3–3 Davao Aguilas (8 July 2018)
  - Dynamic Herb Cebu 3–3 United City (15 October 2022)
  - Stallion Laguna 3–3 One Taguig (25 May 2024)

== All-time Philippines Football League table ==
The all-time Philippines Football League table is a cumulative table of all match results, points and goals of every team that has played in the PFL since its first season in 2017. The table that follows is accurate as of the end of the 2025-26 season. Teams in bold are currently part of the 2025-26 Philippines Football League. Numbers in bold are the record (highest either positive or negative) numbers in each column.

Pos.	Club	Seasons	Pld	Win	Draw	Loss	GF	GA	GD	Pts	1st	2nd	3rd	Best Pos.
1	**Kaya–Iloilo**	**8**	**161**	**110**	20	31	**451**	146	**305**	**350**	3	**3**	1	**1**
2	United City/Ceres–Negros	6	108	78	17	13	344	93	251	251	**4**	0	0	**1**
3	**Stallion Laguna**	**8**	**161**	70	**36**	48	349	225	124	243 (Note: Three points were deducted from Stallion Laguna due to the club's failure to comply with Liga Futbol Inc. Disciplinary Committee’s Decision No. 010318DC03.)	0	0	**3**	3
4	**Dynamic Herb Cebu**	4	79	50	16	13	225	75	150	166	0	2	0	2
5	**Davao Aguilas/Aguilas-UMAK**	5	110	44	26	40	201	151	50	158	0	0	1	3
6	**Manila Digger**	3	57	40	7	10	200	52	148	127	1	1	0	**1**
7	**One Taguig**	3	57	37	11	9	199	42	157	122	0	1	1	2
8	Loyola	3	60	27	10	23	95	117	-22	91	0	0	1	3
9	**Maharlika Football Club**	5	83	25	8	50	115	211	−96	83	0	0	0	5
10	**Mendiola 1991**	6	107	20	12	**75**	117	**368**	−251	72	0	0	0	4
11	Global Cebu	3	77	15	14	48	80	214	–134	59	0	1	0	2
12	JPV Marikina	2	53	16	8	29	88	111	−23	53 (Note: Three points were deducted from JPV Marikina due to the club's failure to comply with Liga Futbol Inc. Disciplinary Committee’s Decision No. 010318DC02.)	0	0	0	5
13	Green Archers United	1	24	10	5	9	42	37	5	35	0	0	0	5
14	**DB Garelli United**	2	38	11	1	26	64	168	-104	34	0	0	0	8
15	Azkals Development Team	2	27	9	3	15	35	41	−6	30	0	0	1	3
16	**Tuloy**	2	38	8	3	27	67	178	-111	27	0	0	0	9
17	Philippine Air Force	2	38	6	2	30	37	145	−108	20	0	0	0	6
18	PFF Youth National Team	1	18	3	4	11	16	49	−33	13	0	0	0	9
19	Ilocos United	1	28	1	6	21	24	73	−49	9	0	0	0	8
20	**Philippine Army**	2	38	2	3	33	34	186	-152	9	0	0	0	11
21	Manila Montet	1	14	0	0	14	3	103	-100	0	0	0	0	15

Club status:

Active
Inactive (not currently participating)
Defunct

== Managers ==
- Most titles: 3,
  - Risto Vidaković (Ceres–Negros) – 2017, 2018, 2019;
  - Yu Hoshide (Kaya–Iloilo) – 2022–23, 2024, 2024–25
- Most clubs managed: 2
  - Dan Padernal (JPV Marikina, Mendiola 1991)
  - Jeongil Kim (Maharlika Manila, Manila Montet)
  - Roxy Dorlas (Maharlika Manila, Loyola)
  - Jovanie Villagracia (Azkals Development Team, One Taguig)
- Longest spell as manager: 9 years, 93 days, Ernest Nierras (Stallion Laguna, 1 January 2017 – 2 April 2025; ongoing )
- Shortest spell as manager: 32 days, Mark Dennis Balbin (Manila Montet, 21 April 2024 – 22 May 2024)
- Oldest manager: Marian Mihail, 65 years, 350 days (for United City v. Philippine Air Force, 21 April 2024)
- Youngest manager: Kenneth Arnaldo, 23 years, 60 days (for Manila Montet v. Philippine Army, 29 May 2024)

== Notes ==
- ^1 Regular season for 2017
- ^2 Won by series for 2017
