= List of Maharlika Taguig F.C. seasons =

Maharlika Taguig is a professional football club based in Taguig, Philippines. The club currently competes in the Philippines Football League, the top-tier of Filipino football. Nicknamed "Koponan ng Masa" or "Team of the mass".

The club was originally founded in 2019 as an all-star seven-a-side team that competed in the 7's Football League.

On 27 July 2020, Maharlika Taguig FC were rumoured by fans as a new club that will compete in the upcoming 2020 Philippines Football League season filling in the gap for the league after Global's suspension. It was led by former Azkals defender Anton del Rosario. The club played their first-ever PFL match on 28 October 2020 at the PFF National Training Center, where they lost to Kaya–Iloilo 1–0 after conceding at the 29th minute mark against Kaya–Iloilo player Jason Panhay. On their following match, on 31 October 2020, Maharlika scored their first-ever goal in the PFL, with Jose Montelibano scoring against Stallion Laguna at the 53rd minute mark due to a rebound, consequently; also getting their first-ever win in the PFL.

== Key ==
Key to divisions:

- PFL = Philippines Football League

Key to rounds:

- GS = Group Stage
- QF = Quarter-finals

== Seasons ==
Correct as of the end of the 2024–25 Philippines Football League regular season.

Seasons of Maharlika Taguig F.C.
Season	League										Copa Paulino Alcantara	Top goalscorer(s)	
Season	Division	Tier	P	W	D	L	GF	GA	Pts	Pos	Copa Paulino Alcantara	Player(s)	Goals
2020	PFL	1	5	1	0	4	2	19	3	5th	Cancelled due to the COVID-19 pandemic.	Jose Montelibano, Jeremy Theuer	1 goal each
2021	PFL	1	Cancelled due to enhanced community quarantine.								Did not participate.	–	
2022	PFL	1	22	2	1	19	14	60	7	5th	GS (6th)	Kim Sung-min (Note: Only goals from 2022 Copa Paulino Alcantara are counted.)	2
2023	PFL	1	22	2	1	19	14	60	7	5th	QF	Ibrahima Ndour	3
2024	PFL	1	14	5	1	8	23	53	16	9th	–	Junior Mailly	7
2024–25	PFL	1	18	5	3	10	21	37	18	7th Regular season	–	Ahmad Saidy, Serge Kaole	5 goals each
