= 2024 in Philippine football =

Football in Philippines
- Season: 2024

Men's football
- Philippines Football League: Kaya–Iloilo

Women's football
- PFF Women's Cup: Stallion Laguna

The following article is a summary of the 2024 football season in the Philippines.

== National teams ==
=== Men's senior ===
==== FIFA World Cup qualification ====
March 21 Second round	Iraq	1–0	Philippines	Basra, Iraq
22:00 UTC+3	Ali 84'	Report (AFC)		Stadium: Basra International Stadium; Attendance: 63,750; Referee: Abdullah Jamali (Kuwait)

March 26 Second round	Philippines	0–5	Iraq	Manila, Philippines
19:00 UTC+8		Report (FIFA); Report (AFC)	Hussein 14' (pen.), 36'; Al-Ammari 30'; Iqbal 62'; Tahseen 77'	Stadium: Rizal Memorial Stadium; Attendance: 10,014; Referee: Nazmi Nasaruddin (Malaysia)

June 6 Second round	Vietnam	3–2	Philippines	Hanoi, Vietnam
19:00 UTC+7	Nguyễn Tiến Linh 65', 76'; Phạm Tuấn Hải 90+5'	Report (FIFA); Report (AFC)	Reichelt 62'; Ingreso 89'	Stadium: Mỹ Đình National Stadium; Referee: Hanna Hattab (Syria)

June 11 Second round	Indonesia	2–0	Philippines	Jakarta, Indonesia
19:30 UTC+7	Haye 31'; Ridho 56'	(FIFA) (AFC)		Stadium: Gelora Bung Karno Stadium; Attendance: 64,942; Referee: Rustam Lutfullin (Uzbekistan)

==== Friendlies ====
September 4 Merdeka Tournament	Philippines	1–2	Malaysia	Kuala Lumpur, Malaysia
21:00 UTC+8	Tabinas 27'	Report	Syamer 43'; Safawi 73' (pen.)	Stadium: Bukit Jalil National Stadium; Attendance: 3,658; Referee: Yudi Nurcahya (Indonesia)

September 8 Merdeka Tournament	Philippines	0–0 (4–3 p)	Tajikistan	Kuala Lumpur, Malaysia
16:30 UTC+8				Stadium: Bukit Jalil National Stadium; Referee: Razlan Joffri Ali (Malaysia)
	Penalties
	Nazarov (penalty scored); Umarbayev (penalty missed); Sharipov (penalty scored); Safarov (penalty scored); Shukurov (penalty scored)		(penalty missed) J. Tabinas; (penalty missed) Gayoso; (penalty scored) P. Tabinas; (penalty scored) Monis; (penalty scored) Rontini

October 11 King's Cup	Thailand	3–1	Philippines	Songkhla, Thailand
20:00 UTC+7	Chanathip 53'; Suphanat 68', 87'		Kristensen 63'	Stadium: Tinsulanon Stadium; Attendance: 24,000

October 14 King's Cup	Tajikistan	0–3	Philippines	Songkhla, Thailand
16:30 UTC+7			Holtmann 47'; J. Tabinas 58'; Bailey 62'	Stadium: Tinsulanon Stadium

November 14 Friendly	Hong Kong	3–1	Philippines	So Kon Po, Hong Kong
20:00 UTC+8	Orr 45', 90+5'; Everton 83'		Kristensen 48'	Stadium: Hong Kong Stadium; Attendance: 4,966; Referee: Warintorn Sassadee (Thailand)

==== ASEAN Championship ====
Philippines advanced to the semifinals of the ASEAN Championship for the first time since 2018 after a 1–0 win against Indonesia on December 21, 2024. Six days later, on December 27, they also achieved their first victory over Thailand in 52 years by winning 2–1 in the first leg of the semifinals.

December 12 GS	Philippines	1–1	Myanmar	Manila, Philippines
18:30 UTC+8	Kristensen 72' (pen.)	Report	Maung Maung Lwin 25'	Stadium: Rizal Memorial Stadium; Attendance: 1,589; Referee: Kim Dae-yong (South Korea)

December 15 GS	Laos	1–1	Philippines	Vientiane, Laos
17:30 UTC+7	Mi. Baldisimo 34' (o.g.)	Report	Reyes 77'	Stadium: New Laos National Stadium; Attendance: 6,389; Referee: Ryo Tanimoto (Japan)

December 18 GS	Philippines	1–1	Vietnam	Manila, Philippines
21:00 UTC+8	Gayoso 68'	Report	Doãn Ngọc Tân 90+7'	Stadium: Rizal Memorial Stadium; Attendance: 3,346; Referee: Akobirxuja Shukurullaev (Uzbekistan)

December 21 GS	Indonesia	0–1	Philippines	Surakarta, Indonesia
20:00 UTC+7		Report	Kristensen 63' (pen.)	Stadium: Manahan Stadium; Attendance: 17,390; Referee: Koji Takasaki (Japan)

December 27 SF Leg 1	Philippines	2–1	Thailand	Manila, Philippines
21:00 UTC+8	Reyes 21'; Linares 90+5'	Report	Suphanan 45'	Stadium: Rizal Memorial Stadium; Attendance: 10,087; Referee: Kim Dae-yong (South Korea)

December 30 SF Leg 2	Thailand	3–1 (a.e.t.) (4–3 agg.)	Philippines	Bangkok, Thailand
20:00 UTC+7	Peeraldol 37'; Gustavsson 54'; Suphanat 116'	Report	Kristensen 84'	Stadium: Rajamangala Stadium; Attendance: 31,876; Referee: Kimura Hiroyuki (Japan)

=== Men's under-20 ===
==== ASEAN U-19 Boys Championship ====
July 17 GS	Indonesia	6–0	Philippines	Surabaya, Indonesia
19:30 UTC+7	Abdulmanan 13', 50'; Gwijangge 22', 43'; Arel 32'; Raven 87'			Stadium: Gelora Bung Tomo Stadium; Referee: Faisal Sulaiman Albalawi (Saudi Arabia)

July 20 GS	Philippines	2–0	Timor-Leste	Surabaya, Indonesia
15:00 UTC+7	Bisong 12', 61'			Stadium: Gelora Bung Tomo Stadium; Referee: Choi Hyun-jai (South Korea)

July 23 GS	Cambodia	1–0	Philippines	Surabaya, Indonesia
19:30 UTC+7	Sovannara 11'			Stadium: Gelora 10 November Stadium; Referee: Jin Jingyuan (China)

==== AFC U-20 Asian Cup qualification ====
September 25 Group H	Thailand	5–0	Philippines	Buriram, Thailand
	Thanakrit 14'; Caelan 16', 24', 45'; Thanawut 75'	Report (AFC)		Stadium: Chang Arena; Attendance: 1,359; Referee: Sultan Mohamed Al Hammadi (United Arab Emirates)

September 27 Group H	Philippines	0–2	Iraq	Buriram, Thailand
		Report	Faisal 10' (pen.); Haji 63'	Stadium: Chang Arena; Attendance: 69; Referee: Chen Hsin-chuan (Chinese Taipei)

September 29 Group H	Philippines	4-0	Brunei	Buriram, Thailand
				Stadium: Chang Arena

=== Men's under-17 ===
==== ASEAN U-16 Boys Championship ====
June 21 GS	Laos	3–0	Philippines	Surakarta, Indonesia
15:00 UTC+7	Daophahad 39'; Fabela 49' (o.g.); Vongdeuan 90+10'	Report		Stadium: Manahan Stadium; Referee: Poon Chun Kit (Hong Kong)

June 24 GS	Philippines	0–3	Indonesia	Surakarta, Indonesia
19:30 UTC+7		Report	Evandra 65'; Mierza 71', 90+2'	Stadium: Manahan Stadium; Referee: Du Jianxin (China)

June 27 GS	Philippines	0–4	Singapore	Surakarta, Indonesia
19:30 UTC+7			Harith 16'; Helmi 66'; Rae Peh 82', 85'	Stadium: Sriwedari Stadium

==== AFC U-17 Asian Cup qualification ====
October 19 Group B	Macau	0–7	Philippines	Phnom Penh, Cambodia
--:-- UTC+7		Report	Omitade 34'; Steen 37' (pen.); Moutzouris 43' (pen.); Webster 55'; Moleje 79'; Abrenica 85'; Amann 86'	Stadium: Olympic Stadium; Attendance: 258; Referee: Veronika Bernatskaya (Kyrgyzstan)

October 21 Group B	Philippines	0–8	Afghanistan	Phnom Penh, Cambodia
--:-- UTC+7		Report	Shirzai 6', 41'; Ahmadi 57', 69'; Safi 63'; Mahbobi 75'; Ibrahimi 81'; Sarwari 90+1' (pen.)	Stadium: Olympic Stadium; Referee: Chuang En-yir (Chinese Taipei)

October 23 Group B	Bangladesh	1-0	Philippines	Phnom Penh, Cambodia
--:-- UTC+7				Stadium: Olympic Stadium

October 27 Group B	Philippines	2-0	Cambodia	Phnom Penh, Cambodia
--:-- UTC+7				Stadium: Olympic Stadium

=== Women's senior ===
==== Friendlies ====
February 21 Friendly	Finland	4–0	Philippines	San Pedro del Pinatar, Spain
15:00 UTC+1	Sevenius 24', 43', 72'; Nyström 28'	Report		Stadium: Pinatar Arena; Attendance: 300; Referee: Katalin Sipos (Hungary)

February 24 Pinatar Cup	Philippines	0–2	Scotland	San Pedro del Pinatar, Spain
		Report	Martha Thomas 23', 36'	Stadium: Pinatar Arena; Attendance: 200; Referee: Jana Adámková (Czech Republic)

February 27 Pinatar Cup	Philippines	0–1	Slovenia	San Pedro del Pinatar, Spain
20:30 UTC+1			Golob 5'	Stadium: Pinatar Arena; Attendance: 30; Referee: Katalin Sipos (Hungary)

April 5 Friendly	South Korea	3–0	Philippines	Icheon, South Korea
19:00 UTC+9	Yu-ri 73'; So-yun 76'; Sel-gi 88'	Report		Stadium: Icheon Sports Complex; Referee: Azusa Sugino (Japan)

April 8 Friendly	South Korea	2–1	Philippines	Icheon, South Korea
19:00 UTC+9	Choo Hyo-joo 1'; Choe Yu-ri 33'	Report	Beard 74'	Stadium: Icheon Sports Complex

October 26 Pink Ladies Cup	Philippines	3–0	Jordan	Antalya, Turkey
16:00 UTC+3	Bolden 2', 68' (pen.); Guillou 77' (pen.)	Report		Stadium: Emirhan Sports Complex

October 30 Pink Ladies Cup	Philippines	1–4	Kenya	Antalya, Turkey
16:00 UTC+3	Bolden 67' (pen.)	Report	Wambui 8'; Long 37' (o.g.); Alukwe 68'; Adhiambo 82'	Stadium: Emirhan Sports Complex

=== Women's under-17 ===
==== Friendlies ====
February 5 MIMA Cup	Philippines	0–2	England	San Pedro del Pinatar, Spain
16:00 UTC+1		Report	Fisher 35'; Cassap 56'	Stadium: Pinatar Arena

February 8 MIMA Cup	Philippines	0–1	Sweden	San Pedro del Pinatar, Spain
			Rolfsson 88'	Stadium: Pinatar Arena

April 25 Unofficial friendly	Philippines	1-0	Kaya-Iloilo	Imus
20:00	Alamo 86'			Stadium: Ayala Vermosa Sports Hub

April 28 Unofficial friendly	Philippines	6-0	Ang Liga selection	Imus
	Mathelus 15'; Villapando 24'; Collins 28'; Alamo 33'; Saludares 45'; K. Bradley 54'			Stadium: Ayala Vermosa Sports Hub

April 28 Unofficial friendly	Philippines	3-0	Manila Digger	Imus
	Preston 36', 40'; Alamo 56'			Stadium: Ayala Vermosa Sports Hub

==== AFC U-17 Women's Asian Cup ====
The Filipinas U17 made their debut in the 2024 AFC U-17 Women's Asian Cup with a 6-1 win over host Indonesia on May 6, 2024. They finished their campaign in the group stage after a 1–1 draw with South Korea.

===== Group A =====
Pos	Team	Pld	W	D	L	GF	GA	GD	Pts	Qualification
1	North Korea	3	3	0	0	22	0	+22	9	Knockout stage
2	South Korea	3	1	1	1	13	8	+5	4	Knockout stage
3	Philippines	3	1	1	1	7	8	−1	4	
4	Indonesia (H)	3	0	0	3	1	27	−26	0	

Source: AFC
Rules for classification: Group stage tiebreakers
(H) Hosts

May 6 GS	Indonesia	1–6	Philippines	Bali, Indonesia
19:00	Scheunemann 12'	Report	Pino 6', 35'; Guy 22'; Markey 29'; Collins 54', 62'	Stadium: Kapten I Wayan Dipta Stadium; Referee: Supiree Testhomya (Thailand)

May 9 GS	Philippines	0–6	North Korea	Bali, Indonesia
16:00		Report	Jon Il-chong 17', 27'; Kang Ryu-mi 24'; Pak Il-sim 31'; Choe Chong-gum 48'; Son Jo-ye 90+3'	Stadium: Bali United Training Center; Referee: Azusa Sugino (Japan)

May 12 GS	South Korea	1–1	Philippines	Bali, Indonesia
16:00	Beom Ye-ju 74'	Report	Markey 38'	Stadium: Bali United Training Center; Referee: Veronika Bernatskaia (Kyrgyzstan)

=== Women's futsal ===
==== ASEAN Women's Futsal Championship ====
The Philippines hosted the inaugural edition of the ASEAN Women's Futsal Championship. The team finished the tournament in 5th place.

November 16 GS	Philippines	2–2	Myanmar	Pasig, Philippines
19:00	Bandoja 12'; Danton 33'	Report	Lwin Lwin Thet 25'; Yoon Mie Mie Lwin 32'	Stadium: Philsports Arena

November 17 GS	Thailand	7–0	Philippines	Pasig, Philippines
19:00	Sangrawee 6', 29'; Sawitree 8'; Paerploy 13'; Arriya 17'; Lalida 24'; Nattamon 40'	Report		Stadium: Philsports Arena; Referee: Qingyun Liang (China)

November 19 GS	Vietnam	6–1	Philippines	Pasig, Philippines
19:00	Trần Thị Lan Mai 13', 28'; Lê Thị Thanh Ngân 21'; Nguyễn Phương Anh 26'; Trần Thị Thu Xuân 29'; K'Thủa 31'		del Campo 24'	Stadium: Philsports Arena

November 20 GS	Philippines	1–2	Indonesia	Pasig, Philippines
19:00	Bandoja 12'	Report	Hendrita 7'; Rusdiana 39'	Stadium: Philsports Arena

== AFC competitions ==
=== AFC Champions League Two ===
==== Group E ====
Pos	Team	Pld	W	D	L	GF	GA	GD	Pts	Qualification	SFR	SYD	KAY	EAS
1	(Japan) Sanfrecce Hiroshima	6	5	1	0	14	5	+9	16	Advance to round of 16	—	2–1	3–0	4–1
2	(Australia) Sydney FC	6	4	0	2	17	6	+11	12	Advance to round of 16	0–1	—	3–1	5–0
3	(Philippines) Kaya–Iloilo	6	1	1	4	6	14	−8	4		1–1	1–4	—	1–2
4	(Hong Kong) Eastern	6	1	0	5	7	19	−12	3		2–3	1–4	1–2	—

Source: AFC
Rules for classification: Tiebreakers

==== Group H ====
Pos	Team	Pld	W	D	L	GF	GA	GD	Pts	Qualification	JBH	MTU	SEL	DHC
1	(South Korea) Jeonbuk Hyundai Motors	6	4	0	2	16	4	+12	12	Advance to round of 16	—	4–1	1–0	4–0
2	(Thailand) Muangthong United	6	3	2	1	16	10	+6	11	Advance to round of 16	1–0	—	1–1	2–2
3	(Malaysia) Selangor	6	3	1	2	9	5	+4	10		2–1	1–2	—	1–0
4	(Philippines) DH Cebu	6	0	1	5	4	26	−22	1		0–6	2–9	0–4	—

Source: AFC
Rules for classification: Tiebreakers

=== ASEAN Club Championship ===
August 22 GS	Kuala Lumpur City (Malaysia)	1–0	(Philippines) Kaya–Iloilo	Kuala Lumpur
21:00 UTC+8	Haqimi Azim 12'	Report		Stadium: Kuala Lumpur Stadium; Referee: Qasim Al-Hatmi (Oman)

September 26 GS	Buriram United (Thailand)	7–0	(Philippines) Kaya–Iloilo	Buriram
19:00 UTC+7	Lucas Crispim 8', 50', 53'; Chaided 15'; Athit Berg 77'; Ratree 84'; Chrigor Moraes 90+1' (pen.)	Report		Stadium: Chang Arena; Referee: Rustam Lutfullin (Uzbekistan)

=== AFC Women's Champions League ===
==== Group B ====
Pos	Team	Pld	W	D	L	GF	GA	GD	Pts	Qualification
1	(Australia) Melbourne City	3	3	0	0	9	1	+8	9	Advance to Quarter-finals
2	(Iran) Bam Khatoon	3	1	1	1	4	4	0	4	Advance to Quarter-finals
3	(Philippines) Kaya–Iloilo	3	0	2	1	1	5	−4	2	
4	(Thailand) College of Asian Scholars (H)	3	0	1	2	1	5	−4	1	

Source: AFC
Rules for classification: Tiebreakers
(H) Hosts

== Leagues ==
=== Philippines Football League ===
Pos	Team	Pld	W	D	L	GF	GA	GD	Pts	Qualification
1	Kaya–Iloilo (Note: Assured a place in the AFC Champions League Two Group stage as 2023 Copa Paulino Alcantara Winners) (C)	14	13	1	0	82	5	+77	40	Qualification for 2024–25 AFC Champions League Two Group stage
2	Dynamic Herb Cebu	14	12	0	2	66	9	+57	36	Qualification for 2024–25 AFC Champions League Two Group stage
3	Stallion Laguna	14	10	2	2	65	12	+53	32	
4	Davao Aguilas	14	10	2	2	39	6	+33	32	
5	One Taguig	14	9	4	1	69	14	+55	31	
6	United City	14	9	3	2	51	13	+38	30	
7	Manila Digger	14	8	0	6	35	25	+10	24	
8	Loyola	14	5	1	8	32	45	−13	16	
9	Maharlika Taguig	14	5	1	8	23	53	−30	16	
10	Mendiola 1991	14	4	1	9	27	46	−19	13	
11	DB Garelli United	14	4	0	10	15	85	−70	12	
12	Tuloy	14	3	0	11	28	52	−24	9	
13	Philippine Air Force	14	3	0	11	19	59	−40	9	
14	Philippine Army	14	2	1	11	15	42	−27	7	
15	Manila Montet	14	0	0	14	3	103	−100	0	

Source: PFL
Rules for classification: 1) Points; 2) Goal difference; 3) Goals scored.
(C) Champions

== Domestic cups ==
=== PFF Women's Cup ===
Stallion Laguna won their first PFF Women's Cup title. Filipinas Chandler McDaniel and Olivia McDaniel were named Most Valuable Player and Best Goalkeeper of the tournament, respectively.

==== Preliminary round ====
Pos	Team	Pld	W	D	L	GF	GA	GD	Pts	Qualification	STA	KAY	MDG	BHT	TLY	AZR
1	Stallion Laguna (C)	5	4	0	1	33	3	+30	12 (Note: Head-to-head points: Stallion Laguna 1–0 Kaya–Iloilo, Manila Digger 1–2 Kaya–Iloilo Manila Digger's matches against Azzurri and Beach Hut are considered as wins. It is uncertain if the goal in the Azzurri match is recognized or if there are any goals awarded in both cancelled games for the purpose of the standings.)	Semifinals	—	1–0	2–1	—	—	—
2	Kaya–Iloilo	5	4	0	1	27	5	+22	12	Semifinals	—	—	—	11–0	6–3	8–0
3	Manila Digger	5	4	0	1	8	4	+4	12	Semifinals	—	1–2	—	—	4–1	~~Nov 10~~
4	Beach Hut	5	2	0	3	8	23	−15	6	Semifinals	0–9	—	—	—	—	5–1
5	Tuloy	5	1	0	4	15	20	−5	3		1–7	—	—	2–3	—	—
6	Azzurri	5	0	0	5	1	37	−36	0		0–15	—	—	—	0–8	—

Source: PFFWL
(C) Champions

==== Knockout stage ====
Semifinals
1	Stallion Laguna	w/o
4	Beach Hut
2	Kaya–Iloilo	2
3	Manila Digger	1

Finals
1	Stallion Laguna	1
2	Kaya–Iloilo	0
Third place
4	Beach Hut
3	Manila Digger	w/o

== Retirements ==
- December 29, 2024: Tahnai Annis, 35, Filipinas captain, retiring from international football.

== See also ==
- Football in Philippines
