= Jahana (surname) =

Jahana (Kanji: 謝花) is a Ryukyuan surname. Notable people with the surname include:

- Daiki Jahana (謝花 大喜, born 1997), Japanese professional footballer
- Kiichiro Jahana (謝花 喜一郎, born 1957), Japanese politician, vice governor of Okinawa Prefecture
- Noboru Jahana (謝花 昇, 1865–1908), Okinawan rights activist and politician

== See also ==
- Okinawan name
