= Leandro (footballer, born 1995) =

Brazilian footballer (born 1995)

Personal information
- Full name: Leandro Fonteles de Queiroz
- Date of birth: September 13, 1995 (age 31)
- Place of birth: Manaus, Brazil
- Height: 1.78 m (5 ft 10 in)
- Position: Attacking midfielder

Team information
- Current team: Don Bosco Garelli
- Number: 9

Youth career
- ASA de Amazonia

College career
Years	Team	Apps	(Gls)
2014–2015	Blackurn College	7	(4)
2015–2016	Talladega College		
2017–2019	Webber International University	11	(5)

Senior career*
Years	Team	Apps	(Gls)
2020–2022	Winter Haven United		
2022–2023	Hippo FC		
2023–2024	BCH Lions		
2024	Don Bosco Garelli	0	(0)
- * Club domestic league appearances and goals as of 9:52, March 26, 2024 (UTC)

Leandro Fonteles de Queiroz (born 13 September 1995), also known as Leandro, is a Brazilian former professional footballer who last plays as an attacking midfielder for Don Bosco Garelli of the Philippines Football League.

== Personal life ==
Leandro was born in Manaus, Brazil, to parents Renato and Andreia. He studied at Pensi-Ponto de Ensino, and played his youth football for ASA de Amazonia.

== Career ==
=== College career ===
After high school, Leandro got a scholarship to study and play football in the United States. He studied in Louisiana State University of Alexandria but first played for Blackurn College in 2014–2015 and racked up 4 goals in 7 matches, and also played for Talladega College in 2015–16. His longest stint came with Webber International University, as he scored 5 goals in 11 matches before graduating in 2019.

=== Early pro career ===
Leandro signed his first contract with Winter Haven United FC, although his stint was interrupted by the COVID-19 pandemic. In 2022, he accepted an offer from Thailand and played for Hippo FC in the Bangkok Premier League.

=== Don Bosco Garelli ===
After playing for one season in the Mongolian Premier League with BCH Lions, he signed with Philippine club Don Bosco Garelli as part of their preparations for the 2024 Philippines Football League season.
