= So Omae =

Japanese footballer (born 1995)

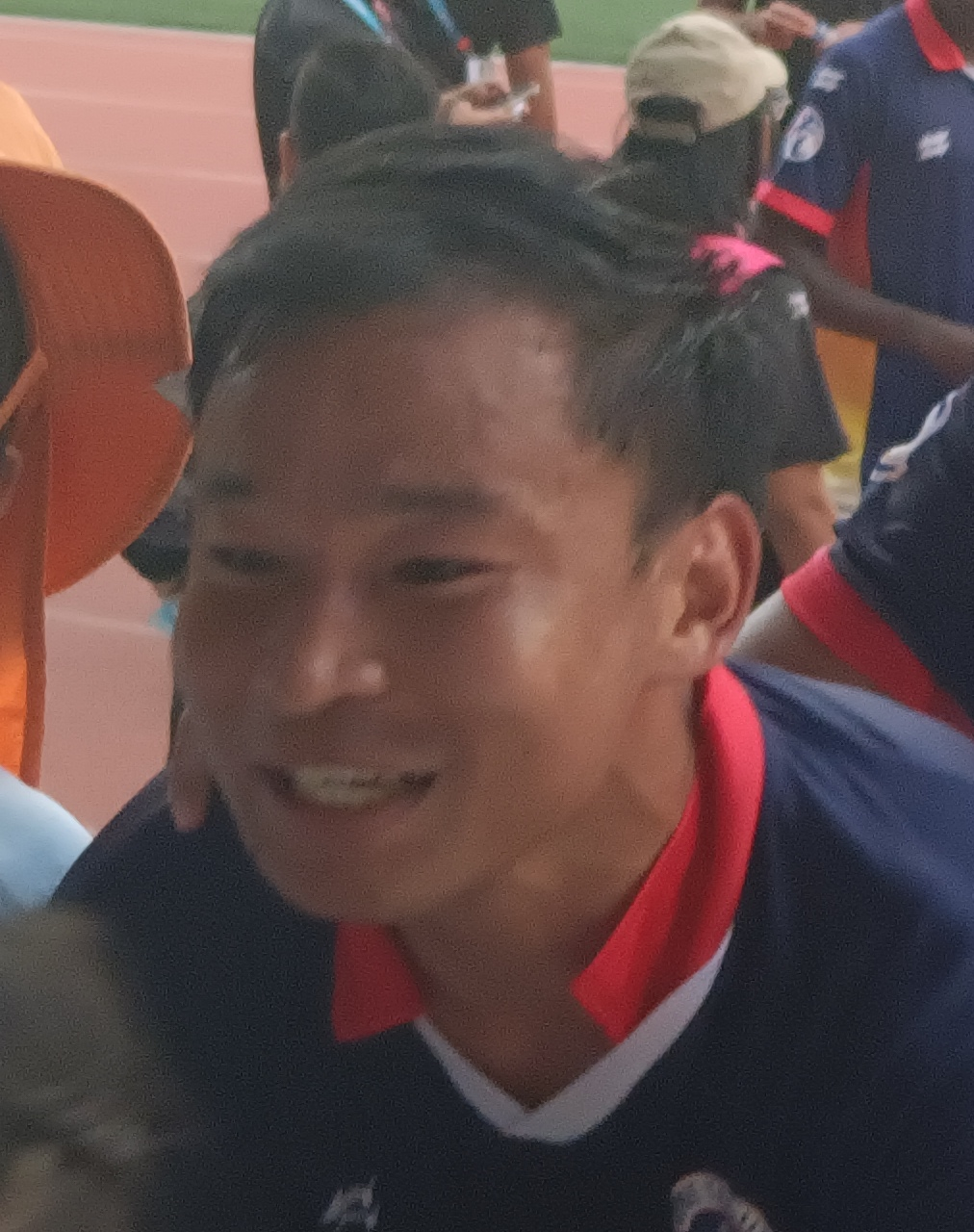
- Omae in 2025

Personal information
- Date of birth: 3 February 1995 (age 31)
- Place of birth: Osaka, Japan
- Height: 1.63 m (5 ft 4 in)
- Position: Defensive midfielder

Team information
- Current team: One Taguig
- Number: 15

Youth career
- Sessel Kumatori
- 2012–2014: Higashiyama High School

College career
Years	Team	Apps	(Gls)
2012–2015	Otemae University		

Senior career*
Years	Team	Apps	(Gls)
–2019	Hokoku FC		
2020–2021	Sakon Nakhon		
2021–2022	Prime Bangkok	2	(1)
2022–2023	Muang Loei United	1	(0)
2023–2024	Prey Veng	18	(4)
2024	Davao Aguilas	5	(0)
2024–	One Taguig	7	(0)
- * Club domestic league appearances and goals as of 26 January 2025

So Omae (大前 壮, Ōmae Sō; born 3 February 1995) is a Japanese professional footballer who plays as a defensive midfielder for Philippines Football League club One Taguig.

== Youth career ==
Omae was born in Osaka in Japan. In his youth, he played for Sessel Kumatori SC alongside players such as Takumi Minamino. He also played high school football for Higashiyama High School in Kyoto. Afterwards, he played for the football club of his college, Otemae University.

== Club career ==
=== First pro contract ===
After graduating from college, he played amateur football with Hokoku FC in the Japanese lower leagues before leaving to pursue a pro career abroad. In December 2019, he tried out for Thai side Sakon Nakhon, where he was praised for his left foot and tactical eye. He was signed by the Thai club in early 2020 before his stint at the club was interrupted by the COVID-19 pandemic. The year after, he moved to Thai League 3 club Prime Bangkok. He would remain in the country for another year, signing with Muang Loei United for one season in 2022. While in Thailand, he also pursued a coaching career with a youth team named Good Morning FC.

=== Prey Veng ===
In 2023, Omae would travel to Cambodia, where he signed for Cambodian Premier League side Prey Veng alongside fellow countryman Ryo Kato. He had a successful season at the club and scored 4 goals from 18 matches as a midfielder, including a free-kick against ISI Dangkor Senchey. During his time at the club, he was also named captain for the remainder of the season until his departure in early 2024.

=== Davao Aguilas ===
Omae would then move to the Philippines, where he signed with Davao Aguilas of the Philippines Football League, a team who were competing in the league for the first time in 6 years. He played there alongside Japanese players Yusuke Unoki and Shoma Sato, as well as Filipino-Japanese captain Daisuke Sato. He made his debut on the opening matchday, a 1–0 win over Mendiola 1991, and assisted the winning goal in the next game against Manila Digger.
