= Joel Villarino =

Filipino football coach (born 1965)

Personal information
- Date of birth: February 4, 1965 (age 61)
- Place of birth: San Carlos, Negros Occidental Philippines

International career
Years	Team	Apps	(Gls)
1996	Philippines		

Managerial career
- 2008–2009: Philippines (women)
- –: Pasargad
- –: Laos
- –: Global (women)
- –: Miriam College
- –: Ateneo Futsal Club
- 2015–2017: Don Bosco
- 2016–: Pasargad
- 2016: Kaya (AFC Cup)
- 2019: Green Archers United
- 2023: Mendiola
- 2023–2024: Don Bosco

Joel Villarino (born February 4, 1965 in San Carlos, Negros Occidental, Philippines) is a Filipino football coach. He is the current head coach of Don Bosco Garelli in the Philippines Football League. He was also a former member of the Philippines national football team.

== Competitive career ==
Villarino played for the Philippines national football team. He made an appearance at the 1998 FIFA World Cup qualifiers playing in the 0–5 loss to Qatar in September 1996.

== Coaching career ==
=== Club ===
Joel Villarino has coached various teams having coached Pasargad F.C., the women's squad of Global F.C., Miriam College varsity team, and the Ateneo Futsal Club by 2013.

==== Pasargad ====
Villarino worked with Pasargad F.C. again as their head coach debuting in a United Football League match against Stallion for Pasargad in July 2016.

==== Kaya (2016 AFC Cup) ====
Serving as head coach Kaya FC only for the 2016 AFC Cup, Villarino led his team in the 0-1 loss to Kitchee SC in their first fixture, hosting Maldivian club New Radiant in their second, the first AFC Cup match Kaya hosted. This was followed by a 1-0 win over Balestier Khalsa in their third game, Villarino exuberant with the victory. The Filipino coach eventually led the club to book their place in the knockout stages, euphoric with results. However, in the round-of-16, his charges were defeated by Johor Darul Takzim 7-2; in spite of the scoreline, Villarino claimed it was 'an honor' to play against JDT.

=== Philippines women's national team ===
Villarino was appointed as the head coach of the Philippines women's national football team in September 2008 and was tasked to mentor the squad that will compete at the 2008 AFF Women's Championship.
