= Junior Mailly =

French footballer (born 1998)

Personal information
- Full name: Junior Mailly
- Date of birth: December 18, 1998 (age 27)
- Place of birth: Paris, France
- Height: 1.78 m (5 ft 10 in)
- Position: Winger

Youth career
- 2010–2014: Boulogne-Billancourt

Senior career*
Years	Team	Apps	(Gls)
2021–2022	Battle Born FC		
2022–2024	San Francisco Glens		
2024	Maharlika Taguig	14	(7)
- * Club domestic league appearances and goals as of 9:34, July 13, 2024 (UTC)

Junior Mailly (born 18 December 1998) is a French professional footballer who plays as a winger.

== Career ==
=== Youth career ===
Mailly grew up in Paris, France, and played for various club academies in Europe, including the youth team of Boulogne-Billancourt. In 2018, his family moved to Nevada in the United States.

=== Early club career ===
After moving to the US, Mailly lived in Reno, Nevada. There, he played football for Battle Born FC, a developmental football team, for one season.

In 2022, he tried out for the San Francisco Glens of the USL League Two, and was the only player from tryouts that day to make it to the team. In his first season with the club, he netted five goals in nine matches. He would renew for another season before departing in early 2024.

=== Maharlika Taguig ===
In late 2023, Mailly participated in a combine led by Anton del Rosario, aimed at giving US-based players a chance to play for teams in the Philippines Football League. Mailly signed with del Rosario's team Maharlika Taguig shortly after as a foreign reinforcement for the 2024 season.

He made his debut for the club in the opening matchday against Tuloy, where Maharlika won 3–2. He scored his first goal for the club in a 4–2 win over Philippine Air Force, and scored a hat-trick the following matchday in a 3–1 win over Don Bosco Garelli.
