= Daiki Jahana =

Japanese footballer (born 1997)

Personal information
- Date of birth: 24 August 1997 (age 29)
- Place of birth: Uruma, Okinawa, Japan
- Height: 1.69 m (5 ft 7 in)
- Position: Attacking midfielder

Team information
- Current team: Manila Digger
- Number: 69

Youth career
- Kawasaki AFC
- Agena Junior High School
- Gushikawa High School

Senior career*
| Years | Team | Apps | (Gls) |
| 2016–2017 | Siesta Yomitan | | |
| 2018–2019 | Fitzroy City | | |
| 2019–2020 | Dainava | | |
| 2020–2021 | Saturday Football International | 7 | (4) |
| 2022 | Kaiho Bank SC | 5 | (0) |
| 2022–2023 | Khaan Khuns-Erchim | | |
| 2023 | Khovd | | |
| 2023–2024 | Kirivong Sok Sen Chey | 7 | (0) |
| 2024– | Manila Digger | 13 | (5) |
- * Club domestic league appearances and goals as of 3:55, July 11, 2024 (UTC)

Daiki Jahana (謝花 大喜, Jahana Daigi; born 24 August 1997) is a Japanese professional footballer who plays as an attacking midfielder for Philippines Football League club Manila Digger.

== Youth career ==
Jahana was born in the city of Uruma in Okinawa Prefecture, Japan. In his youth, he played high school football for both Agena Junior High School and Gushikawa High School. He also played for the youth team of Kawasaki AFC.

== Club career ==
=== Playing abroad ===
After finishing school, Jahana played for Japanese club Siesta Yomitan for one year. In 2018, he moved to Australia and played for several clubs in Melbourne, most notably Fitzroy City. After a brief season there, he moved to Lithuania and played for DFK Dainava, in the second tier of Lithuanian Football called the Pyrma Liga. In 2020, he transferred to Taiwanese side Saturday Football International, and departed the club early the next year.

=== Mongolia ===
In 2022, after a brief stint back in Japan with Kaiho Bank SC, he moved to Mongolia and played for Khaan Khuns-Erchim FC as an Asian import, as the club won the 2021–22 title in his first season. However, midway through the season he transferred clubs, staying in Mongolia and instead playing for Khovd FC.

=== Cambodia ===
Jahana ended his short stay at Khovd and signed again within Asia, playing as an AFC player for Cambodian Premier League side Kirivong Sok Sen Chey. Over the first half of the season, he would make 7 appearances before departing in the transfer window at the end of the year.

=== Manila Digger ===
In March 2024, it was reported that Jahana had signed a contract with Manila Digger, a club entering the Philippines Football League for the first time for the 2024 season. He was included in the club's roster for the season, and scored his first goal on his debut, a match winner against Philippine Army. He had a successful stint at the club, making double digits in appearances and registering multiple goals and assists.
