= Tsukasa Shimomura =

Japanese footballer

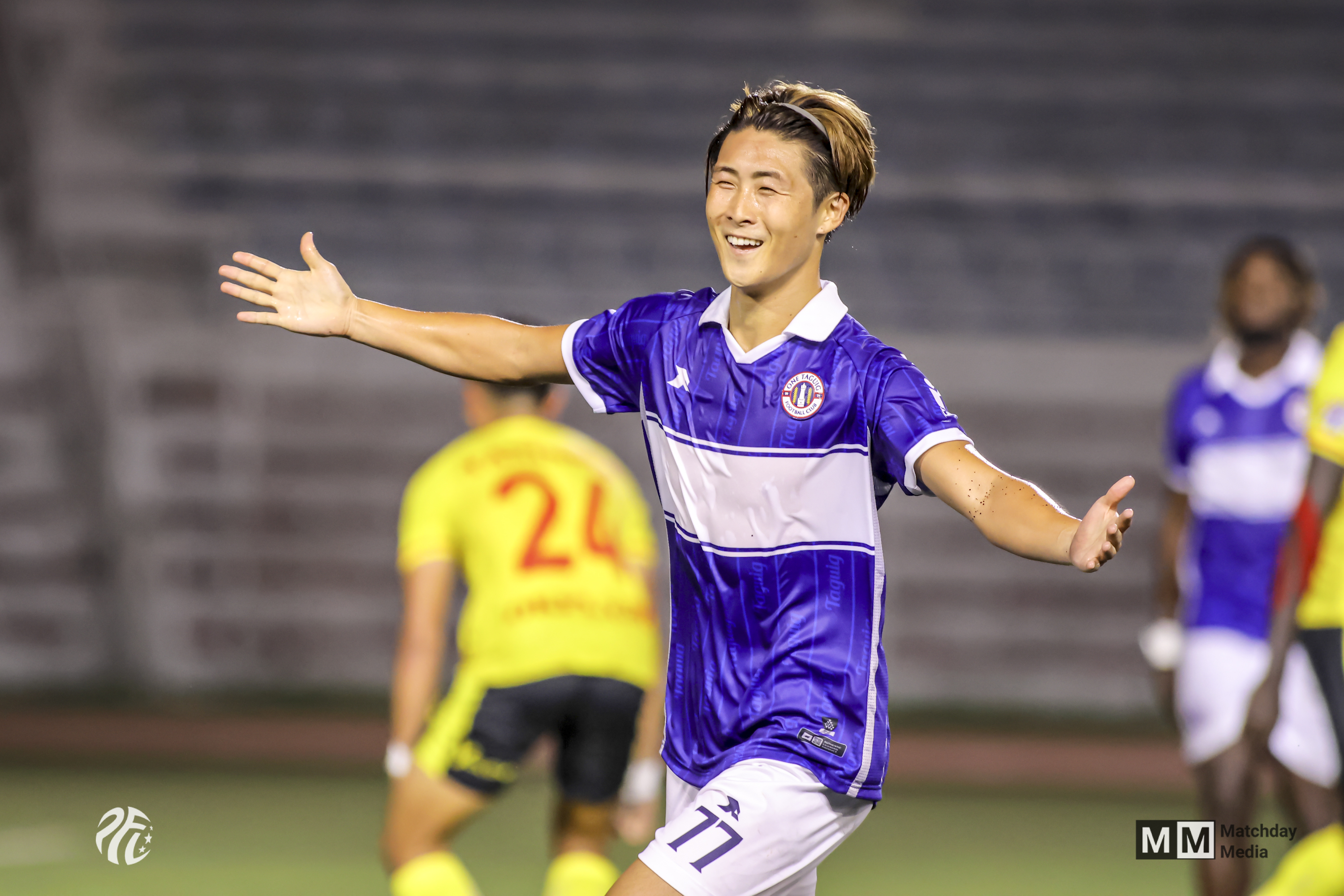
- Shimomura with One Taguig in 2024

Personal information
- Date of birth: 26 September 1997 (age 29)
- Place of birth: Tokyo, Japan
- Position: Forward

Youth career
- Tokyo Verdy
- 2013–2015: Ichiritsu Funabashi High School

College career
Years	Team	Apps	(Gls)
2016–2020	Toin University of Yokohama		

Senior career*
Years	Team	Apps	(Gls)
2020–2021	Veertien Mie		
2021–2023	Hokkaido Tokachi Sky Earth	8	(3)
2023–2024	Tokyo 23	1	(0)
2024–2025	One Taguig	29	(29)
2025	Salavan United	9	(7)
2026–	Young Elephants	8	(6)
- * Club domestic league appearances and goals as of 9:45, June 29, 2024 (UTC)

Tsukasa Shimomura (下村 司, Shimomura Tsukasa; born 26 September 1997) is a Japanese professional footballer who plays as a forward for Lao League 1 club Young Elephants.

== Personal life ==
Shimomura was born in the Tokyo area. He is the fourth of five siblings, and began playing football at an early age. His father was a football coach at the local training center.

== Career ==
=== Youth career ===
As a kid, Shimomura played for the youth academy of J1 League club Tokyo Verdy. Later, he went on to study and play for Funabashi Municipal High School where he won the national championship.

=== College career ===
After graduating high school, Shimomura played college football for the varsity team of Toin University of Yokohama in 2016. He graduated from the college in 2020.

=== Club career in Japan ===
After college, Shimomura played for a number of lower-tier Japanese clubs. He signed his first professional contract with Veertien Mie, before leaving after 1 year to join Hokkaido Tokachi Sky Earth. After renewing his contract for 1 more season, he joined hometown club Tokyo 23 FC.

=== One Taguig ===
In 2024, the announcement was made that Shimomura would leave Tokyo 23 to play abroad, signing with new club One Taguig of the Philippines Football League as an international reinforcement. He scored in his first game for the club against Manila Montet, scoring 4 in his next game against the Philippine Air Force.

=== Salavan United ===
In August 2025, Shimomura joined Salavan United, a club competing in Lao League 1. The move marked his first time playing in Laos. Shimomura was assigned the number 77 shirt and continued in his role as a centre forward. During the first half of the season, he recorded 7 goals and 4 assists, establishing himself as one of the league’s most productive attacking players. His performances earned him 4th highest goal scorer.

=== Young Elephants FC ===
In December 2025, he moved to Young Elephants FC ahead of the 2026 season. He made an immediate impact by scoring two goals on his debut and was named Player of the Match.
