= Naoto Hiraishi =

Japanese footballer

Naoto Hiraishi 平石 直人
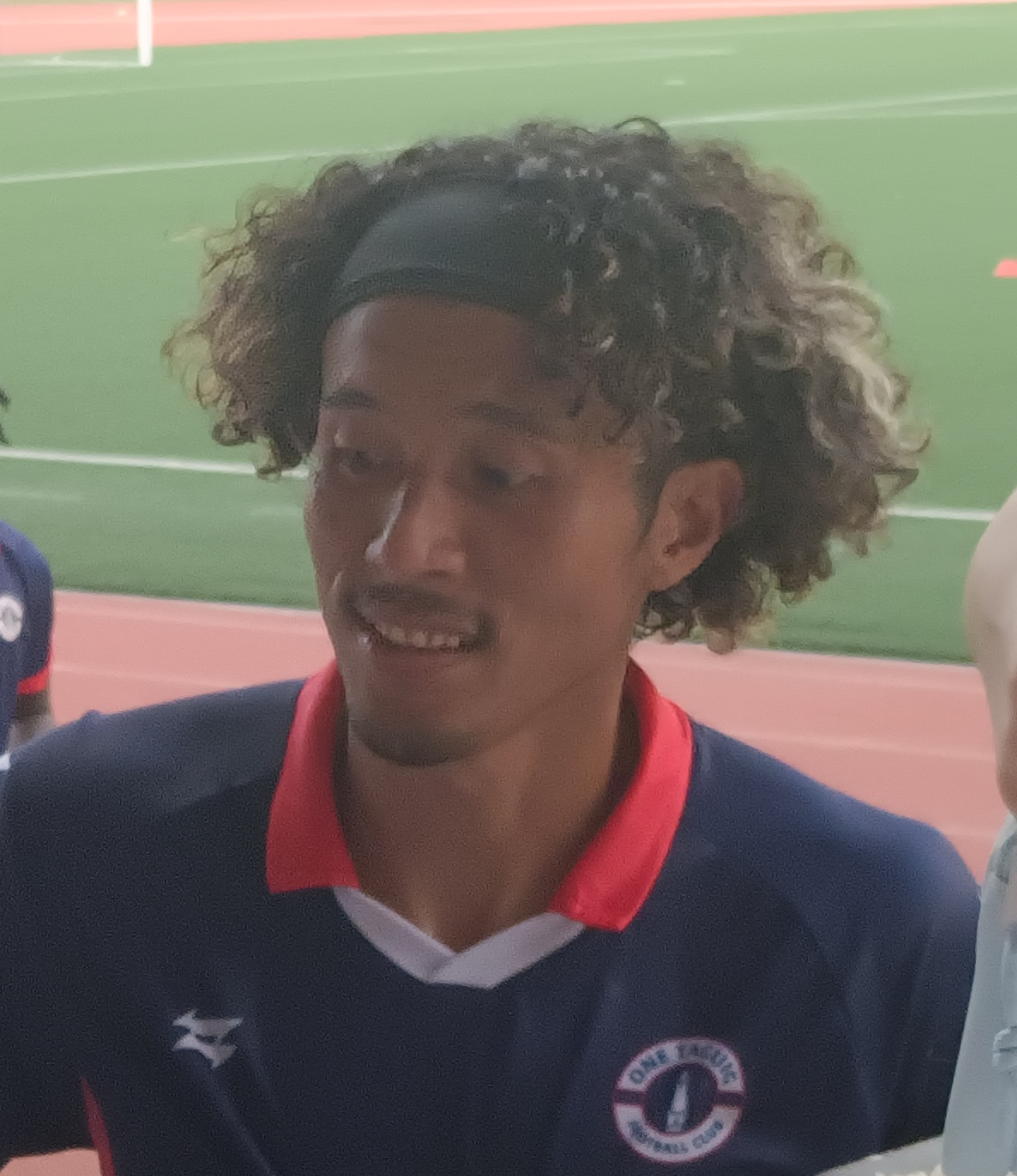
- Hiraishi in 2025

Personal information
- Full name: Naoto Hiraishi
- Date of birth: June 23, 1992 (age 34)
- Place of birth: Kanagawa, Japan
- Height: 1.76 m (5 ft 9 1/2 in)
- Position: Midfielder

Team information
- Current team: One Taguig
- Number: 29

Youth career
- 2008–2010: Teikyo High School

College career
Years	Team	Apps	(Gls)
2011–2014	Toyo University		

Senior career*
Years	Team	Apps	(Gls)
2015	FC Machida Zelvia	0	(0)
2016–2017	Fujieda MYFC	54	(4)
2018	Blaublitz Akita	21	(1)
2019	SC Sagamihara		
2021	Ococias Kyoto AC		
2024–	One Taguig		
- * Club domestic league appearances and goals

Naoto Hiraishi (平石 直人, Hiraishi Naoto; born June 23, 1992) is a Japanese professional footballer who plays for One Taguig of the Philippines Football League.

== Career ==
Naoto Hiraishi joined J3 League club; FC Machida Zelvia in 2015. He moved to Fujieda MYFC in 2016.

== Club statistics ==
Updated to 23 February 2019.

Club performance			League		Cup		Total	
Season	Club	League	Apps	Goals	Apps	Goals	Apps	Goals
Japan			League		Emperor's Cup		Total	
2015	Machida Zelvia	J3 League	0	0	0	0	0	0
2016	Fujieda MYFC	J3 League	26	3	–		26	3
2017	Fujieda MYFC	J3 League	28	1	–		28	1
2018	Blaublitz Akita	J3 League	21	1	0	0	21	1
Total			75	5	0	0	75	5
