= Yusuke Unoki =

Japanese footballer (born 1996)

Personal information
- Full name: Yusuke Unoki
- Date of birth: 30 April 1996 (age 30)
- Place of birth: Tokyo, Japan
- Height: 1.80 m (5 ft 11 in)
- Position: Forward

Youth career
- –2014: Kashiwa Reysol

College career
Years	Team	Apps	(Gls)
2014–2016	Kanto Gakuin University		

Senior career*
Years	Team	Apps	(Gls)
2016–2017	VfB Homberg	8	(0)
2018–2019	1. FC Kleve	27	(8)
2020	Kajaani	7	(0)
2020–2021	Kultsu	7	(1)
2022	NK Krk		
2023–2024	Shinagawa CC Yokohama		
2024	Davao Aguilas	12	(11)
2024	Hong Kong Rangers	1	(0)
- * Club domestic league appearances and goals as of 24 December 2024

Yusuke Unoki (宇野木 悠佑, Unoki Yūsuke; born 30 April 1996) is a Japanese professional footballer who plays as a forward.

== Youth career ==
Unoki was born in the Tokyo area, and played for the youth team of J-League Kashiwa Reysol all the way until the Under 18 Level. In college, he played for the football team of Kanto Gakuin University.

== Club career ==
=== Germany ===
After graduating, he travelled to Germany to play football for lower league side VfB Homberg. He was moderately successful and stayed there for one season, before moving to another German side, 1. FC Kleve. He had his most successful stint yet, scoring 8 goals across 27 appearances in his only season at the club.

=== Finland ===
In mid-2020, Unoki moved to Finnish side AC Kajaani. However, his time at the club was less productive, marred by the COVID-19 pandemic and various injuries. In the latter half of the year he transferred to another Finnish side, Kultsu FC, but likewise struggled for goals, being played on the wing rather than up front.

=== Shinagawa CC ===
Unoki returned to his home country of Japan a year after having another brief stint abroad with Croatian side NK Krk. He signed for Shinagawa CC Yokohama, playing with them for a full season before departing in early 2024.

=== Davao Aguilas ===
In early 2024, it was reported that Unoki had signed a contract with Davao Aguilas of the Philippines Football League, who were returning to the league after 6 years away. Unoki made his debut in the opening matchday, a 1–0 win over Mendiola, scoring his first two goals in a 6–0 win over Manila Montet. He had a successful season scoring over 10 goals for the club, including a hat-trick against Maharlika Taguig.

=== Rangers ===
On 2 October 2024, Unoki joined Hong Kong Premier League club Rangers.
