= Ibrahima Ndour =

Senegalese footballer (born 1995)

Personal information
- Full name: Ibrahima Ndour
- Date of birth: 10 January 1995 (age 31)
- Place of birth: Senegal
- Position: Striker

Senior career*
Years	Team	Apps	(Gls)
–2020	Mbour Petite-Côte		
2020–2021	Stallion Laguna	4	(2)
2022–2024	Maharlika Manila	14	(5)
2024	Davao Aguilas	14	(10)
- * Club domestic league appearances and goals as of 12:58, July 14, 2024 (UTC)

Ibrahima "Endo" Ndour (born 10 January 1995) is a Senegalese professional footballer who plays as a striker.

== Club career ==
=== Stallion Laguna ===
Before moving to the Philippines, Ndour was playing football for Senegalese Ligue 1 club Mbour Petite-Côte. He tried out for PFL club Stallion Laguna, but the club's season was interrupted by the COVID-19 pandemic.

He finally made his debut for the club in late 2020, scoring in the opening game against Maharlika Manila, though the club ended up losing 2–1. He would score one more goal in the brief 5-game season as Stallion lost 7–1 to eventual champions United City.

=== Maharlika Manila ===
Ndour left Stallion in early 2021 and remained clubless, though during that time he played 7s football for Maharlika's 7s team. In 2022, he joined the senior team as a mid-season signing, finishing the season with two goals.

In 2023, he was retained by Maharlika as a reinforcement for the 2023 Copa Paulino Alcantara. The club made it to the quarter-finals, with Ndour scoring 3 goals during the campaign.

=== Davao Aguilas ===
In 2024, Ndour switched to Davao Aguilas, who were returning to the league for the first time in 6 years. He made his debut against Mendiola 1991 on the 2nd matchday and scored the winning goal. The season would be his most prolific yet as he tallied 8 goals so far, including a hat trick against Manila Montet.
