= Shoma Sato (footballer) =

Japanese footballer (born 1999)

Personal information
- Date of birth: 6 October 1999 (age 27)
- Place of birth: Yonezawa, Yamagata, Japan
- Height: 1.86 m (6 ft 1 in)
- Position: Centre-back

Team information
- Current team: One Taguig
- Number: 21

Youth career
- Yonezawa Phoenix
- Abeeca Yonezawa
- 2016–2018: Yonezawa Chuo High School

Senior career*
Years	Team	Apps	(Gls)
2018–2019	Thespakusatsu Challengers		
2019–2020	SC Sagamihara		
2020–2021	Albirex Niigata (S)	0	(0)
2021–2022	FC Awaji-shima	7	(1)
2023–2023	Vonds Ichihara		
2023	Favoritner AC	9	(2)
2023–2024	Bisamberg	18	(0)
2024	Davao Aguilas	13	(1)
2024–	One Taguig	6	(0)
- * Club domestic league appearances and goals as of 4:24, January 26, 2025 (UTC)

Shoma Sato (佐藤 彰真, Satō Akimasa; born 6 October 1999) is a Japanese professional footballer who plays as a centre-back for Philippines Football League club One Taguig.

== Personal life ==
Sato was born in Yonezawa in the prefecture of Yamagata. He began playing football at a very young age and is currently a Yamagata Oshoshina Tourism Ambassador.

== Career ==
=== Youth career ===
Sato played youth football for his high school, Yonezawa Chuo HS, as well as for Yonezawa Phoenix and Abeeca Yonezawa. At the age of 19, he played for the U21 of lower league team SC Sagamihara.

=== Career in Japan ===
Sato left Sagamihara and played professionally for a number of lower tier Japanese sides. From 2018 to 2019, he played for the challengers team of Thespa Kusatsu.

After returning to Japan two years later, he played for one season at FC Awaji-shima where he made 7 appearances, playing for Vonds Ichihara the following season.

=== Albirex Niigata Singapore ===
In between his stints at Japanese clubs, Sato signed his first professional contract abroad with Albirex Niigata of the Singapore Premier League, a club then composed of mostly Japanese nationals. Albirex ended the season as champions of the 2020 Singapore Premier League, though Sato remained on the bench for most of the season and didn't play a competitive match, before departing early the next year.

=== Playing in Austria ===
Sato next played in Austria, signing for Austrian fourth-tier side Favoritner AC where he scored two goals. After a brief spell, he had a more successful stint with FC Bisamberg, making 18 appearances across two seasons.

=== Davao Aguilas ===
In 2024, Sato left Austria to sign a contract in the Philippines. He signed with Davao Aguilas, a club returning to the PFL for the first time in 6 years. He made his first start in a 1–0 win over Mendiola, scoring his first goal for the club in a 1–0 win against Manila Digger.
