= Daisuke Sato (footballer) =

Filipino footballer (born 1994)

Daisuke Sato 佐藤 大介
- Sato after participating in a FIFA international friendly match for the Philippines in 2023.

Personal information
- Full name: Daisuke Caumanday Sato
- Date of birth: September 20, 1994 (age 32)
- Place of birth: Davao City, Philippines
- Height: 1.70 m (5 ft 7 in)
- Position: Left-back

Team information
- Current team: One Taguig
- Number: 66

Youth career
- 2007–2012: Urawa Red Diamonds
- 2012–2013: Sendai University

Senior career*
Years	Team	Apps	(Gls)
2014–2016	Global	31	(5)
2016–2017	Politehnica Iași	24	(0)
2017	Horsens	3	(0)
2018–2019	Sepsi OSK	44	(0)
2019–2021	Muangthong United	17	(1)
2021	Suphanburi	14	(0)
2022	Ratchaburi	14	(0)
2022–2024	Persib Bandung	44	(2)
2024	Davao Aguilas	10	(0)
2024–	One Taguig	34	(8)

International career^{‡}
2014	Philippines U21	3	(0)
2014–	Philippines	67	(4)
Medal record
Men's football
Representing Philippines
AFC Challenge Cup
Silver medal – second place	2014 Maldives
- * Club domestic league appearances and goals as of May 20, 2026 ‡ National team caps and goals as of October 2, 2026

Daisuke Caumanday Sato (Japanese: 佐藤 大介, romanized: Satō Daisuke; born September 20, 1994) is a Filipino professional footballer who plays as a left-back for Filipino club One Taguig, which he captains, and the Philippines national team.

== Early life ==
Sato was born in Davao City, Philippines to a Filipino mother and a Japanese father. He was a member of the youth team of the Urawa Red Diamonds.

== Club career ==
Global announced on March 7, 2014, that it had signed Daisuke Sato.

=== Politehnica Iași ===
In June 2016, he went on trial with Romanian Liga I side Politehnica Iași. He also featured in five pre-season training matches where he started one match and came on as a substitute on the other four. The team won one and drew four. He was able to impress coach Nicolò Napoli and was signed permanently on a four-year contract.

On September 17, 2016, Sato played the whole match against Dinamo Bucuresti as CSM Politehnica Iași lost 3–1, thus becoming the first Filipino-born to play in Romania.

=== Horsens ===
In late June 2017, it was announced that Sato had signed for Danish Super League outfit Horsens on a three-year deal. However, on 6 December 2017, it was announced that Sato terminated his contract with Horsens. He played a total of four matches for the club.

=== Sepsi OSK ===
After his stint in Denmark, Daisuke Sato returned to Romania to play in Liga I. On January 5, 2018, it was reported that Sato has signed in with Sepsi OSK. Sato left the club in May 2019. Sato had 44 appearances for Sepsi over two seasons.

=== Muangthong United ===
Thai League side Muangthong United in June 2019 announced that they have signed Sato.

=== Suphanburi ===
On July 7, 2021, after Sato's contract with Muangthong United has ended. He decided to join another Thai League side Suphanburi on a free transfer.

=== Persib Bandung ===
On June 11, 2022, Sato joined a Liga 1 team Persib Bandung. He made his league debut on July 24 in a match against Bhayangkara at the Wibawa Mukti Stadium, Cikarang. In November 2023, Persib announced that he would be placed on loan to another club. Persib announced Sato's release from the club on 31 January 2024.

=== Davao Aguilas ===
Sato would return to the Philippines in early 2024, to join Philippines Football League returnee club Davao Aguilas. Aside from being a player, he was tasked to be teach at the club's football youth academy in coordination of the University of Makati.

=== One Taguig ===
On September 11, 2024, Sato joined Filipino side One Taguig.

== International career ==
Sato made his international debut in a friendly match against Nepal in April 2014 and assisted a goal from his club mate. The footballer was part of the Philippine squad that played at the 2014 AFC Challenge Cup, where the team finished in second place.

Sato scored his first international goal in a 2–3 loss against Myanmar during the 2014 Philippine Peace Cup. He scored his second goal for his country with a long range strike in an exhibition match against Cambodia.

== Career statistics ==
=== Club ===
As of 1 October 2023

Club	Season	League			Cup (Note: Includes the UFL Cup, Cupa României, and Danish Cup.)		Continental		Other (Note: Includes Singapore Cup and UFL FA League Cup.)		Total	
Club	Season	Division	Apps	Goals	Apps	Goals	Apps	Goals	Apps	Goals	Apps	Goals
Global	2014	UFL Div 1	14	3	—		—		?	1 (Note: Goal scored in UFL FA League Cup.)	14	4
Global	2015	UFL Div 1	14	1	?	1	6	0	5	0	25	2
Global	2016	UFL Div 1	3	1	?	0	—		1	1	4	2
Global	Total		31	5	?	1	6	0	6	2	43	8
Politehnica Iași	2016–17	Liga I	24	0	2	0	—		—		26	0
Politehnica Iași	Total		24	0	2	0	—		—		26	0
AC Horsens	2017–18	Superliga	3	0	1	0	—		—		4	0
AC Horsens	Total		3	0	1	0	—		—		4	0
Sepsi OSK	2017–18	Liga I	16	0	—		—		—		16	0
Sepsi OSK	2018–19	Liga I	28	0	1	0	—		—		29	0
Sepsi OSK	Total		44	0	1	0	—		—		45	0
Muangthong United	2019	Thai League 1	7	1	—		—		—		7	1
Muangthong United	2020	Thai League 1	10	0	0	0	—		—		10	0
Muangthong United	Total		17	1	0	0	—		—		17	1
Suphanburi	2021–22	Thai League 1	14	0	—		—		—		14	0
Ratchaburi Mitr Phol	2021–22	Thai League 1	14	0	0	0	—		—		14	0
Persib Bandung	2022–23	Liga 1	31	2	0	0	—		—		31	2
Persib Bandung	2023–24	Liga 1	13	0	0	0	—		—		13	0
Career total			191	8	4	1	6	0	6	2	207	11

=== International ===
As of September 29, 2026

Appearances and goals by year
National team	Year	Apps	Goals
Philippines	2014	16	2
Philippines	2015	8	0
Philippines	2016	4	0
Philippines	2017	6	1
Philippines	2018	7	0
Philippines	2019	8	0
Philippines	2020	0	0
Philippines	2021	4	0
Philippines	2022	1	0
Philippines	2023	6	0
Philippines	2024	0	0
Philippines	2025	0	0
Philippines	2026	7	1
Total		67	4

Scores and results list the Philippines' goal tally first.

#	Date	Venue	Opponent	Score	Result	Competition
2014
1.	September 6	Rizal Memorial Stadium, Manila, Philippines	Myanmar	1–1	2–3	2014 Philippine Peace Cup
2.	November 14	Rizal Memorial Stadium, Manila, Philippines	Cambodia	1–0	3–0	Friendly
2017
3.	June 13	Pamir Stadium, Dushanbe, Tajikistan	Tajikistan	4–2	4–3	2019 AFC Asian Cup qualification
2026
4.	August 1	New Laos National Stadium, Vientiane, Laos	Laos	4–1	4–1	2026 ASEAN Championship

== Honours ==
Philippines

- AFC Challenge Cup runner-up: 2014
