= Alfredo Cortez =

American soccer player

Personal information
- Full name: Alfredo Cortez
- Date of birth: September 12, 1998 (age 28)
- Place of birth: Monrovia, California, United States
- Height: 6 ft 5 in (1.96 m)
- Position: Goalkeeper

Youth career
- –2016: Golden State Force

College career
| Years | Team | Apps | (Gls) |
| 2016–2019 | Cal State Fullerton | 7 | (0) |
| 2019–2020 | Loyola Marymount University | 6 | (0) |

Senior career*
| Years | Team | Apps | (Gls) |
| 2021 | Golden State Force | | |
| 2021–2023 | San Diego 1904 | 11 | (0) |
| 2023–2024 | Chiriaco FC | | |
| 2024–2025 | Stallion Laguna | 13 | (0) |
| 2025–2026 | Kaya F.C.–Iloilo | 18 | (0) |
- * Club domestic league appearances and goals as of March 19, 2026

Alfredo "Freddy" Cortez (born September 12, 1998) is an American professional soccer player who plays as a goalkeeper.

== College career ==
=== Cal State Fullerton ===
As a kid, Cortez lived in Monrovia, California. He played for the academy team of Golden State Force.

In 2016, he committed to the soccer team of the Cal State Fullerton Titans, though he didn't appear in any matches as a freshman. As a sophomore he made 5 appearances, making a crucial penalty save in the Big West Conference championship. He would play again for the Titans as a junior in 2018.

=== Loyola Marymount University ===
Cortez joined the Loyola Marymount Lions in 2019. He made his first start in a match against Western Michigan, and went on to make four appearances for the Lions.

== Club career ==
=== United States ===
After his college career was cut short due to the COVID-19 pandemic, Cortez signed with his former academy club Golden State Force, being included in that year's Conference and Regional selections. In 2021 he played for San Diego 1904 FC before the club was absorbed and subsequently became Albion San Diego. In 2023, he was on the roster of UPSL champions, Chiriaco FC.

=== Stallion Laguna ===
On January 12, 2024, Stallion Laguna of the Philippines Football League teased the signing of Cortez. His transfer to the Philippine club was confirmed a day later, where he played as one of the club's foreign reinforcements.
