= Serge Kaole =

Cameroonian footballer

Personal information
- Full name: Louis Serge Kaole
- Date of birth: 17 June 1990 (age 36)
- Place of birth: Yaounde, Cameroon
- Height: 1.71 m (5 ft 7 1/2 in)
- Position: Defender

Team information
- Current team: Maharlika F.C.

Youth career
- 1998–2004: ÉF Brasseries
- 2004–2010: Vogt AC

Senior career*
Years	Team	Apps	(Gls)
2010–2011	Fovu Club		
2015	Stallion Laguna		
2016–2017	Global Cebu		
2018–2020	Kaya–Iloilo		
2020	Maharlika Manila		
2022–2023	Mendiola 1991	13	(0)
2023	Davao Aguilas	3	(3)
2024	United City		
- * Club domestic league appearances and goals

Louis Serge Kaole (born 17 June 1990) is a Cameroonian professional footballer who plays as a defender for Maharlika F.C.
