= One Taguig F.C. =

Football club in Metro Manila, Philippines

One Taguig
- Full name: One Taguig Football Club
- Short name: 1TFC
- Founded: February 5, 2024; 2 years ago
- Owner: City Government of Taguig
- Head coach: Arvin Soliman
- League: Philippines Football League
- 2025–26: Philippines Football League, 2nd of 10
Home colours	Away colours

One Taguig Football Club is a professional football club based in Taguig, Metro Manila, Philippines. The club last played in the Philippines Football League, the top-flight league of football in the Philippines.

== History ==
In February 2024, One Taguig was announced to be one of the new clubs of the Philippines Football League (PFL) and would be provisionally known as the City of Taguig. They received support from the local city government of Taguig. Having no social media presence for the next two months, the club's players would train and prepare for their Philippines Football League debut.

Shortly prior to the start of the 2024 season, their first, the club would brand itself as One Taguig. The club would have Ace Bright as its club manager. On 4 April 2024, the club play it first ever professional match in their history in a 4–1 league win against Manila Montet. In the next league match on 13 April, the club recorded their highest ever win in their history in a 8–0 win against Philippine Air Force with Japanese player, Tsukasa Shimomura becoming the first ever player to scored a hat-trick for the club. One Taguig finished the 2025–26 Philippines Football League as runners-up and qualified for the 2026–27 AFC Challenge League group stage.

While the club was set to appear in the AFC Challenge League, One Taguig was not among the announced list for the 2026–27 PFL season in August. The PFL and the Philippine Football Federation did issue a statement in October 2026, that One Taguig failed to submit its participation requirements in time. One Taguig went to Bali a week ahead of its scheduled AFC Challenge League matches to conduct a training camp. However, the AFC communicated that One Taguig has withdrawn from the competition on October 15. One Taguig released a statement that they were forced to withdraw. The PFF and PFL denied manufacturing a situation which led to its withdrawal. The PFF withdrew One Taguig's club license after it learned of outstanding wage issues based from documents submitted by the club to the AFC in September 2026.

== Team image ==
=== Crest ===
The club's crest features the historic Napindan Lighthouse, with the old structure used as a meeting point by the revolutionary group Katipunan during the Philippine Revolution. The 38 leaves of the two stalks represents the barangays of Taguig as well as the development of the club's home city.

== Players (2026) ==
Note: Flags indicate national team as defined under FIFA eligibility rules; some limited exceptions apply. Players may hold more than one non-FIFA nationality.

No.	Pos.	Nation	Player
4	MF	PHI	John Lucero
5	DF	GAM	Lamin Samateh
7	MF	CMR	Darlton Digha
8	MF	PHI	Marwin Angeles
9	FW	PHI	Andres Aldeguer
10	MF	JPN	Naoto Hiraishi
12	GK	PHI	Arjun Lasco
13	DF	CMR	James Sunday
15	DF	BRA	Pablo Andrade
16	MF	COL	Kevin Lopez
18	MF	JPN	So Omae

No.	Pos.	Nation	Player
17	MF	PHI	Marvin Angeles
19	MF	PHI	Ryen Lim
21	MF	PHI	Oliver Bias
22	MF	JPN	Ichiro Aoki
27	MF	COL	Santiago Ramírez
29	FW	PHI	Patrick Reichelt (Vice-captain)
30	GK	CMR	Henri Bandeken
31	DF	PHI	Christian Schaffner
66	DF	PHI	Daisuke Sato (Captain)
77	MF	SLE	Kwame Quee
98	GK	USA	Alfredo Cortez

== Club staff (2026) ==
Position	Name
Technical director	(Germany) Michael Weiß
Sporting director	(Iran) Shahryar Dastan
Head coach	(Philippines) Arvin Soliman
Assistant coach	(Philippines) Darren Hartmann
Goalkeeping coach	(Philippines) Eduard Sacapaño

== Head coaches ==
- (Philippines) Jovanie Villagracia (2024–2025)
- (Philippines) Arvin Soliman (2025)
- (Republic of Ireland) Scott Cooper (2025)

== Honors ==
- Philippines Football League
  - Runners-up: 2025–26

== Records ==
=== Domestic tournament records ===
Season	Division	League position	Copa Paulino Alcantara
2024	PFL	5th	—
2024–25	PFL	3rd (League)	—
2024–25	PFL	Semi-final (Finals Series)	—
2025–26	PFL	—	—

== Continental record ==
Season	Competition	Round	Opponent	Home	Away	Aggregate
2026–27	AFC Challenge League	Group stage	(Indonesia) Borneo	n/p	n/p	—
2026–27	AFC Challenge League	Group stage	(Chinese Taipei) Tainan City	n/p	n/p	—
2026–27	AFC Challenge League	Group stage	(Myanmar) Yangon United	n/p	n/p	—
