= Don Bosco Garelli F.C. =

Don Bosco – Garelli
- Full name: Don Bosco – Garelli United Football Club
- Nickname: The Greywolves
- Short name: Don Bosco; Garelli United; Garelli
- Founded: 2013; 13 years ago
- Chairman: Karl Mark Claudio
- Head coach: Karl Claudio
- League: Philippines Football League
- 2025–26: Philippines Football League, 8th of 15
Home colours	Away colours	Third colours

Don Bosco – Garelli United Football Club, also known as Don Bosco Garelli or DB Garelli United, is a professional football club based in Makati, Manila, Philippines. The club last played in the Philippines Football League, the top flight league of football in the Philippines.

== History ==
Don Bosco Garelli United was established by ex-seminarians and former Don Bosco students as a mean to provide boys education through football. It was named after Bartholomew Garelli, the first student of Italian priest and Roman Catholic saint John Bosco in 1841.

Don Bosco Garelli has fielded a 7-a-side team in the AIA 7's Football League. DB Garelli United debuted in the 2023 Copa Paulino Alcantara. In late 2023, DB Garelli United announced that they would be joining the 2024 Philippines Football League, the top-flight league of football in the Philippines. The league confirmed their participation in February 2024, making debut in the top-flight competition.

== Players (2026) ==
Note: Flags indicate national team as defined under FIFA eligibility rules; some limited exceptions apply. Players may hold more than one non-FIFA nationality.

No.	Pos.	Nation	Player
1	GK	PHI	Reignold Reaso
2	DF	PHI	Ian Eadie
5	DF	PHI	Eugene Arriola
6	FW	KOR	Kim Min-kap
8	FW	CMR	Desmond Ngai
10	MF	ENG	Daniel Stokoe
11	MF	BRA	Felipe Melgaço
12	FW	PHI	Gino Clarino
13	DF	PHI	Romel Catarinin
14	DF	SEN	Babacar Ndiaye
16	MF	GHA	Michael Brobbey
17	FW	GHA	Ernest Quaye
18	DF	PHI	Michael Simms
19	MF	NGR	Solomon Okereke

No.	Pos.	Nation	Player
22	FW	AUS	Samuel Crowford
23	MF	JPN	Yuta Yamaguchi
25	MF	PHI	Banjo Mahinay
28	DF	SEN	Pape Malang Traore
31	GK	JPN	Shotaro Ishii
34	FW	PHI	Jerome Abarca
37	FW	JPN	Kai Kimura
44	MF	JPN	Hayato Kame
47	GK	IRI	Matin Mohtasham
56	DF	PHI	McKevitt Bacon
80	DF	PHI	Isaac Johnson
81	DF	LBN	Karim Chahine
93	MF	JPN	Renante Bangi

== Head coaches ==
- (Philippines) Karl Claudio (2024)

== Domestic tournament records ==
Season	Division	League position	Copa Paulino Alcantara
2023	Did not participate		Group stage
2024	PFL	11th	—
