= Manila Montet FC =

Manila Montet
- Seal during its participation in the 2024 PFL season.
- Full name: Manila Montet Football Club
- Founded: December 2023; 2 years ago
- Ground: Rizal Memorial Stadium
- Capacity: 12,873
- Owner: The Montet Group
- President: Thomas Vivian Montet
- League: Philippines Football League
- 2024: Philippines Football League, 15th of 15
- Website: https://www.manilamontet.com/
Home colours	Away colours

Manila Montet Football Club is a Philippine professional football club based in Metro Manila. The club once played in the Philippines Football League, the top-flight league of football in the Philippines, competing in the 2024 season, its only season in the league to date.

== History ==
=== Foundation and 2024 PFL campaign ===
Manila Montet FC is owned by The Montet Group, under the management of Thomas Vivian Montet, a French businessman who moved to the Philippines. The club itself was established around December 2023. Manila Montet applied for a license to be able to join the Philippines Football League (PFL) for the 2024 season. In February 2024, the league confirmed Manila Montet's participation making their first ever debut in the top-flight league. The club designated the Rizal Memorial Stadium as their home venue for the 2024 season.

The club was accused of mismanagement, and providing insufficient financial compensation for its players. Head coach Eliezer Fabroada left after their 1–4 loss in their first game against One Taguig. His deputy, Mark Dennis Balbin was promoted, and later left his position for a new role in futsal in Tondo.

Manila Montet lost all 14 of their league matches, finishing last among the 15 clubs that competed that season.

=== Post-PFL ===
Manila Montet initially expressed its intent to continue competing in the PFL and was reportedly set to participate in a planned Division 2 competition. However, the club did not compete in the succeeding 2024–25 PFL season, which retained a single-division format.

In early 2025, Manila Montet established the Manila Montet Challenge Series, an independently organized football competition featuring matches between the club and invited teams. In 2026, the organization now known as Manila Montet Sports Club launched its volleyball program.

== Management ==
Position	Name
Chairman	(France) Thomas Vivian Montet
Team managers	(Philippines) Jericho Tingzon (Philippines) Nixon Paez
Media manager	(Philippines) Ricci Parcia
Marketing managers	(Philippines) Cristine Roberto (Philippines) Lorry Orqueza
Kitman	(Philippines) Rich Balla

== Head coaches ==
Dates	Name
January – February 2024	(South Korea) Kim Jeong-il
February – April 2024	(Philippines) Eliezer Fabroada
April – May 2024	(Philippines) Mark Dennis Balbin

== Domestic records ==
Season	Division	League position	Copa Paulino Alcantara
2024	PFL	15th	—
