= 2025–26 Manila Digger F.C. season =

Manila Digger
2025–26 season
- Head Coach: (China) Haijun Li
- Stadium: Rizal Memorial Stadium
- Philippines Football League: Regular season: 1st Championship Round: 1st
- Champions League Two: Qualifying play-offs
- AFC Challenge League: Semi-finals
- Top goalscorer: League: Ousman Gai (29); All: Ousman Gai (35)
- Biggest win: 14–0 v Tuloy (Away); March 25, 2026 (Philippines Football League)
- Biggest defeat: 0–3 v PKR Svay Rieng (Home); April 16, 2026 (AFC Challenge League)

The 2025–26 season of Manila Digger is the club's 4th competitive season in the top-flight. This season, Manila Digger is set to participate in the AFC Challenge League after losing in the qualifying play-offs of the AFC Champions League Two. This season is also their debut in the continental stage.

== Transfers ==
=== Pre-season transfer ===
==== In ====
Position	Player	Transferred from	Fee	Source
GK	(The Gambia) Omar Njie	(The Gambia) BST Galaxy	Free	
DF	(United States) Christian Schaffner	(Philippines) Stallion Laguna	Free	
DF	(The Gambia) David Sambou	(The Gambia) Real de Banjul	Free	
DF	(Philippines) OJ Clarino	(Philippines) Davao Aguilas	Free	
FW	(The Gambia) Baboucarr Tourray	(The Gambia) Real de Banjul	Free	
FW	(Philippines) Troy Limbo	(Philippines) Davao Aguilas	Free	

==== Out ====
Position	Player	Transferred To	Fee	Source
GK	(Brazil) Johnny Wesley	(Malta) Nadur Youngsters	Free	
GK	(Philippines) Aries Palabrica	(Philippines) Philippine Air Force	Free	
DF	(Philippines) Dean Ebarle	(Philippines) Maharlika	Free	
DF	(Philippines) Jimson Crestal	(Philippines) Valenzuela PB–Mendiola	Free	
DF	(Philippines) Giap Bongolan	(Philippines) Aguilas–UMak	Free	
MF	(Philippines) Dylan De Bruycker	(Thailand) Ayutthaya United	Free	
FW	(Cameroon) Kevin Ebene Moukouta	Free agent	N/A	
FW	(Philippines) Jim Ashley Flores	Free agent	N/A	
FW	(Brazil) Abner Dos Santos	Free agent	N/A	
FW	(Philippines) Eric Giganto	(Philippines) Maharlika	Free	
FW	(Philippines) Earl Piñero	(Philippines) Maharlika	Free	
FW	(Philippines) Kintaro Miyagi	(Philippines) Maharlika	Free	

=== Mid-season transfers ===
==== In ====
Position	Player	Transferred from	Fee	Source
MF	(Japan) Yuga Watanabe	(Mongolia) Khovd Khuleguud	Free	
MF	(Sweden) Lars William Kvist	(Thailand) Prime Bangkok	Free	
FW	(Philippines) Jeremiah Borlongan	(Philippines) Dynamic Herb Cebu	Free	
DF	(Philippines) Charles Dabao III	(Malaysia) Melaka	Free	
MF	(The Gambia) Assan Badjie	(The Gambia) Team Rhino FC	Free	
FW	(The Gambia) Mustapha Jallow	(The Gambia) Fortune FC	Free	
MF	(Philippines) Justin Baas	(Malaysia) Melaka	Free	

==== Out ====
Position	Player	Transferred To	Fee	Source
MF	(Japan) Hayato Kame	(Philippines) Don Bosco Garelli United	Free	
DF	(Philippines) Darwin Regala	(Philippines) Philippine Army	Free	

== Squad ==
No.	Name	Nat.	Date of Birth (Age)	Signed in	Signed from
Goalkeepers
1	Michael Asong	(Philippines)	October 3, 1998 (age 27)	2025	(Canada) Vic West
16	Omar Njie	(The Gambia)	September 27, 2004 (age 21)	2025	(The Gambia) BST Galaxy
28	Nelson Gasic	(Philippines)	May 14, 1993 (age 33)	2023	(Philippines) Stallion Laguna
Defenders
2	Jordan Jarvis	(Philippines)	April 17, 1998 (age 28)	2024	(Philippines) One Taguig
6	Daniel Ashley	(Ghana)	February 22, 1994 (age 32)	2024	–
19	Johnmar Barsanilla	(Philippines)	January 28, 2002 (age 24)	2024	(Philippines) One Taguig
20	Modou Joof	(The Gambia)	October 1, 2002 (age 23)	2024	(Morocco) CR Bernoussi
22	Zachary Taningco	(Philippines)	October 8, 2004 (age 21)	2024	(Philippines) United City
23	David Sambou	(The Gambia)	November 2, 2002 (age 23)	2025	(The Gambia) Real de Banjul
27	OJ Clarino	(Philippines)	July 27, 1990 (age 36)	2025	(Philippines) Davao Aguilas
30	Charles Dabao III	(Philippines)	September 30, 1997 (age 28)	2026	(Malaysia) Melaka
31	Christian Schaffner	(United States)	September 25, 2000 (age 25)	2025	(Philippines) Stallion Laguna
Midfielders
4	Assan Badjie	(The Gambia)	May 11, 2003 (age 23)	2026	(The Gambia) Team Rhino
7	Lars William Kvist	(Sweden)	August 25, 1994 (age 32)	2025	(Thailand) Prime Bangkok
8	Ifeanyi Ugwu	(Nigeria)	April 12, 1991 (age 35)	2023	(Philippines) Manila Nomads
12	Modou Manneh	(The Gambia)	February 13, 2001 (age 25)	2024	(The Gambia) Real de Banjul
14	Kenji Nishioka	(Philippines)	June 9, 2001 (age 25)	2024	(Japan) Edo All United
15	Ousman Gai	(The Gambia)	March 6, 2000 (age 26)	2024	(The Gambia) Banjul United
29	Shirmar Felongco	(Philippines)	April 27, 1993 (age 33)	2024	(Mongolia) Bavarians FC
70	Justin Baas	(Philippines)	March 16, 2000 (age 26)	2026	(Malaysia) Melaka
Forwards
3	Shou Sha	(China)	December 20, 1988 (age 37)	2023	–
5	Dilane Wamba	(Cameroon)	August 21, 2002 (age 24)	2024	–
9	Yuga Watanabe	(Japan)	May 15, 1996 (age 30)	2025	(Mongolia) Khovd Khuleguud
10	Saikou Ceesay	(The Gambia)	April 8, 2000 (age 26)	2024	(The Gambia) BK Milan
11	Baboucarr Tourray	(The Gambia)	December 19, 2005 (age 20)	2025	(The Gambia) Real de Banjul
77	Diao Su	(China)	December 20, 1988 (age 37)	2023	–
98	Troy Limbo	(Philippines)	November 17, 1998 (age 27)	2025	(Philippines) Davao Aguilas
99	Mustapha Jallow	(The Gambia)	September 26, 2004 (age 21)	2026	(The Gambia) Fortune
–	Jeremiah Borlongan	(Philippines)	August 12, 1998 (age 28)	2026	(Philippines) Dynamic Herb Cebu

== Competitions ==
=== Overview ===
Competition	Record								Started round	Final position / round	First match	Last match
Competition	G	W	D	L	GF	GA	GD	Win %	Started round	Final position / round	First match	Last match
Philippines Football League	20	17	3	0	103	13	+90	85.00	Matchday 1	TBC	August 30, 2025	May 30, 2026
AFC Champions League Two	1	0	0	1	1	2	−1	0.00	Qualifying play-offs		August 13, 2025	
AFC Challenge League	7	3	3	1	11	9	+2	42.86	Group Stage	Semi-finals	October 26, 2025	April 16, 2026
Total	28	20	6	2	115	24	+91	71.43				

Updated to match played May 8, 2026
Source: Competitions

=== Philippines Football League ===
==== League table ====
===== Regular season =====
Pos	Team	Pld	W	D	L	GF	GA	GD	Pts	Qualification
1	Manila Digger	20	17	3	0	103	13	+90	54	Championship round
2	One Taguig	20	17	1	2	84	9	+75	52	Championship round
3	Dynamic Herb Cebu	20	13	3	4	70	21	+49	42	Championship round
4	Kaya–Iloilo	20	13	2	5	68	13	+55	41	Championship round
5	Stallion Laguna	20	9	6	5	58	22	+36	33	Championship round
6	Aguilas–UMak	20	10	2	8	45	28	+17	32	Championship round
7	Maharlika	20	9	2	9	43	35	+8	29	Classification round
8	Don Bosco Garelli United	20	5	0	15	32	74	−42	15	Classification round
9	Tuloy	20	3	2	15	27	119	−92	11	Classification round
10	Valenzuela PB-Mendiola	20	2	1	17	13	99	−86	7	Classification round
11	Philippine Army	20	0	2	18	14	124	−110	2	Classification round

Source: PFF

==== Results summary ====
Overall								Home						Away					
Pld	W	D	L	GF	GA	GD	Pts	W	D	L	GF	GA	GD	W	D	L	GF	GA	GD
20	17	3	0	103	13	+90	54	8	2	0	46	8	+38	9	1	0	57	5	+52

Last updated: 8 May 2026.
Source: Competitive matches

==== Results by matchday ====
Matchday	1	2	3	4	5	6	7	8	9	10	11	12	13	14	15	16	17	18	19	20
Ground	A	H	H	H	H	H	A	A	A	H	H	H	H	A	A	H	A	A	A	A
Result	W	D	W	W	W	D	W	W	D	W	W	W	W	W	W	W	W	W	W	W
Position	2	3	2	2	2	3	3	2	2	2	2	2	3	2	2	2	2	2	1	1

Updated to match(es) played on May 2, 2026. Source: Matches
A = Away; H = Home; W = Win; D = Draw; L = Loss; P = Postponed

==== Matches ====
Win Draw Loss

August 30, 2025 1	Valenzuela PB–Mendiola	2–9	Manila Digger	Manila
19:00 UTC+8	Nkoa 22'; Fofana (yellow card) 35'; Doctora 45+2' (pen.); Naingallan (red card) 72'		Ceesay 4', 31', 45+4', 80'; Joof 30' (pen.); Nishioka 51', 90+1'; Gai 54'; Wamba 57'; Felongco (yellow card) 72'	Stadium: Rizal Memorial Stadium

September 14, 2025 2	Manila Digger	1–1	Stallion Laguna	Manila
19:00 UTC+8	Gai (yellow card) 45+1'; Sambou (yellow card) 72'; Watanabe 90+8'		Diallo 48'; Shibab (yellow card) 65'; McMillan (yellow card) 69'; Schröck (red card) 80'; Zang (yellow card) 90+5'	Stadium: Rizal Memorial Stadium

September 20, 2025 3	Manila Digger	3–2	Maharlika	Manila
19:45 UTC+8	Ceesay (yellow card) 28'; Tourray 37'; Joof 43'; Wamba (yellow card) 65'; Schaffner (yellow card) 72'; Asong (red card) 78'; Gai 90+3'		Uzoka 12', 90+7'; McLeod (yellow card) 30'; Rilloraza (yellow card) 42'; Ebarle (yellow card) 62'; Menzi (yellow card) 73'	Stadium: Rizal Memorial Stadium

September 27, 2025 4	Manila Digger	1–0	One Taguig	Manila
20:30 UTC+8	Ceesay 10'; Sambou (yellow card) 50'		Sato (yellow card) 45+1'; Halm (yellow card) 66'	Stadium: Rizal Memorial Stadium

October 5, 2025 5	Manila Digger	8–2	Tuloy	Manila
19:00 UTC+8	Nishioka 18'; Schaffner 29'; Tourray 33', 43', 54'; Ceesay 45+1'; Gai 47'; Kvist 82'		C. Saut 30'; Jalique 45+3'; S. Saut (yellow card) 85'	Stadium: Rizal Memorial Stadium

October 19, 2025 6	Manila Digger	1–1	Dynamic Herb Cebu	Manila
19:00 UTC+8	Touray 25'; Gai (yellow card) 60'; Kvist (yellow card) 64'; Joof (red card) 68'		Corsame 53'; Amirul (red card) 60'; Khamis (yellow card) 69'	Stadium: Rizal Memorial Stadium

November 22, 2025 7	Kaya–Iloilo	0–2	Manila Digger	Manila
20:30 UTC+8	Diano (yellow card) 36'; Ott (yellow card) 42'; Rey (yellow card) 88'; Basindanan (yellow card) 90+10'		Touray 18'; Gai (yellow card) 75' (goal) 89'; Manneh (yellow card) 83'; Sambou (yellow card) 90+16'	Stadium: Rizal Memorial Stadium

November 29, 2025 8	Philippine Army	0–8	Manila Digger	Manila
15:00 UTC+8	Celiz (yellow card) 11'		Ceesay 3', 50', 72', 80'; Manneh 5'; Wamba 45+1', 45+2'; Nishioka 76'	Stadium: Rizal Memorial Stadium

January 17, 2026 9	Aguilas–UMak	0–0	Manila Digger	Manila
20:30 UTC+8	Gai (yellow card) 7'		Fujihira (yellow card) 11'; Amita (yellow card) 18'; Talaroc (yellow card) 33'	Stadium: Rizal Memorial Stadium

February 11, 2026 10	Manila Digger	12–0	Valenzuela PB–Mendiola	Manila
15:00 UTC+8	Touray 29', 45+3', 48'; Ceesay 34'; Jallow 52', 57', 59', 73'; Manneh 55'; Nishioka 67', 84'; Wamba 89'			Stadium: Rizal Memorial Stadium

February 25, 2026 (Note: Match originally scheduled on November 9, 2025, but was postponed due to Typhoon Uwan.) 11	Manila Digger	6–1	Don Bosco Garelli	Manila
19:00 UTC+8	Gai 17', 53', 70'; Nishioka 59'; Jallow 90+1'; Touray 90+3'		Ngai 45+5'; Eadie (yellow card) 84'	Stadium: Rizal Memorial Stadium

February 28, 2026 12	Manila Digger	1–0	Kaya–Iloilo	Manila
19:00 UTC+8	Manneh (yellow card) 24'; Touray 33'; Jarvis (yellow card) 77'; Baas (yellow card) 87'		Zambrano (yellow card) 20'; Rey (yellow card) 76'	Stadium: Rizal Memorial Stadium

March 8, 2026 13	Manila Digger	3–1	Aguilas–UMak	Manila
19:00 UTC+8	Baas (yellow card) 15'; Joof (yellow card) 36'; Touray 38'; Gai 45+2'; Nishioka 55'		Diallo (yellow card) 5'; Djibrila 13'; Villareal (yellow card) 35'	Stadium: Rizal Memorial Stadium

March 21, 2026 14	Don Bosco Garelli	2–6	Manila Digger	Manila
15:00 UTC+8	Yamaguchi 13', 45+2'; Clarino (yellow card) 76'; Crowford (yellow card) 87'		Jallow 2'; Sambou 26'; Manneh 28', 89' (yellow card) 71'; Wamba 57'; Gai 60'; Barsanilla (yellow card) 90+1'	Stadium: Rizal Memorial Stadium

March 25, 2026 15	Tuloy	0–14	Manila Digger	Manila
20:00 UTC+8			Touray 19', 45'; Gai 22', 45+3', 51', 55', 59', 60'; Badjie 29'; Nishioka 57', 90+2'; Ceesay 65', 80'; Su 90+1'	Stadium: Rizal Memorial Stadium

March 29, 2026 16	Manila Digger	10–0	Philippine Army	Manila
16:00 UTC+8	Manneh 3'; Gai 22', 34', 54', 57', 63', 66'; Touray 56'; Jarvis 74'; Ceesay 90+1'		Celiz (yellow card) 7'	Stadium: Rizal Memorial Stadium

=== AFC Champions League Two ===
==== Qualifying stage ====
August 13, 2025 Playoff	Persib (Indonesia)	2–1	(Philippines) Manila Digger	Bandung, Indonesia
	Putra (yellow card) 35'; Asong 38' (o.g.); Barros 73'; Matricardi (yellow card) 77'	AFC Report	Sambou (yellow card) 42'; Joof 66'; Manneh (yellow card) 81'; Clarino (yellow card) 88'	Stadium: Gelora Bandung Lautan Api (Note: Match originally scheduled in Philippines changed to neutral ground at Bandung due to lack of ground available to Manila.)

=== AFC Challenge League ===
==== Group Stage ====
Pos	Team	Pld	W	D	L	GF	GA	GD	Pts	Qualification	SVR	MDF	SPF	EZR
1	(Cambodia) PKR Svay Rieng (H)	3	2	1	0	8	2	+6	7	Advance to Quarter-finals		2–2	3–0	3–0
2	(Philippines) Manila Digger	3	2	1	0	7	3	+4	7	Advance to Quarter-finals			2–0	3–1
3	(Mongolia) SP Falcons	3	1	0	2	3	6	−3	3					3–1
4	(Laos) Ezra	3	0	0	3	2	9	−7	0					

Source: AFC
Rules for classification: Tiebreakers
(H) Hosts

October 26, 2025 Match 1	Manila Digger (Philippines)	3–1	(Laos) Ezra	Svay Rieng, Cambodia
19:00 UTC+7	Gai 14'; Wamba 21'; Touray 56'	AFC	Phanthavong 29'; Nakamura (yellow card) 81'	Stadium: Morodok Techo National Stadium; Attendance: 777; Referee: Ali Reda (Lebanon)

October 29, 2025 Match 2	SP Falcons (Mongolia)	0–2	(Philippines) Manila Digger	Svay Rieng, Cambodia
16:00 UTC+7	Ferreira (yellow card) 53'; Otgonbaatar (yellow card) 56'	AFC	Gai (yellow card) 27' (goal) 61'; Ceesay 39'; Wamba (yellow card) 45'; Felongco (yellow card) 58'	Stadium: Morodok Techo National Stadium; Attendance: 461; Referee: Virendha Rai (Bhutan)

November 1, 2025 Match 3	Manila Digger (Philippines)	2–2	(Cambodia) PKR Svay Rieng	Svay Rieng, Cambodia
19:00 UTC+7	Gai 39', 62'; Nishioka (yellow card) 65'	AFC	Ogawa (yellow card) 29'; Peprah 47'; Sosidan 85'	Stadium: Morodok Techo National Stadium; Referee: Ali Reda (Lebanon)

==== Knockout stage ====
===== Quarter finals =====
March 5, 2026 First leg	Manila Digger (Philippines)	1–0	(Indonesia) Dewa United Banten	Manila, Philippines
20:30 UTC+8	Nishioka 21'; Touray (yellow card) 45+4'	AFC	Lowe (yellow card) 45+2'	Stadium: Rizal Memorial Stadium; Attendance: 1,471; Referee: Du Jianxin (China)

March 12, 2026 Second leg	Dewa United Banten (Indonesia)	2–2	(Philippines) Manila Digger	Tangerang, Indonesia
20:30 UTC+7	Prasetyo (yellow card) 46'; Lowe 66', 81'; Setiawan (yellow card) 89'	AFC	Gai 35' (yellow card) 60'; Joof 52'	Stadium: Sports Centre Kelapa Dua; Referee: Daniel Elder (Australia)

===== Semi finals =====
April 9, 2026 First leg	PKR Svay Rieng (Cambodia)	1–1	(Philippines) Manila Digger	Svay Rieng, Cambodia
19:00 UTC+7	Alves 4'	Report	Gai 85'	Stadium: Morodok Techo National Stadium; Attendance: 16,602; Referee: Chae Sang-hyeop (South Korea)

April 16, 2026 Second leg	Manila Digger (Philippines)	0–3	(Cambodia) PKR Svay Rieng	Manila, Philippines
20:00 UTC+8		Report	Krya 11'; Peprah 39', 68'	Stadium: Rizal Memorial Stadium; Attendance: 2,065; Referee: Sadullo Gulmurodi (Tajikistan)

== Statistics ==
=== Appearances ===
As of match played March 29, 2026

Players with no appearances are not included on the list Players on Italic left the club mid-season

No.	Player	Pos.	Philippines Football League	AFC Champions League Two	AFC Challenge League	Total
1	(Philippines) Michael Asong	GK	6	1	1	8
2	(Philippines) Jordan Jarvis	DF	14	0+1	0+4	19
3	(China) Shou Sha	CF	0+1			1
4	(The Gambia) Assan Badjie	MF	6+1		2	9
5	(Cameroon) Dilane Wamba	FW	5+3	1	5	14
6	(Ghana) Daniel Ashley	DF	1+2		5	8
7	(Sweden) Lars William Kvist	MF	0+2		0+1	3
8	(Nigeria) Ifeanyi Ugwu	MF	0+2		0+1	3
9	(Japan) Yuga Watanabe	MF	3+7		0+5	14
10	(The Gambia) Saikou Ceesay	FW	9+6	1	3+2	21
11	(The Gambia) Baboucarr Touray	FW	13+2	1	5	21
12	(The Gambia) Modou Manneh	MF	10+1	1	5	17
14	(Philippines) Kenji Nishioka	MF	13+2	0+1	5	21
15	(The Gambia) Ousman Gai	MF	13+1	1	5	20
16	(The Gambia) Omar Njie	GK	9+1		4	14
18	(Philippines) Darwin Regala	DF	0+3	0+1		4
19	(Philippines) Johnmar Barsanilla	DF	5+5			10
20	(The Gambia) Modou Joof	DF	10	1	5	16
21	(Philippines) Jeremiah Borlongan	DF	1+1			2
22	(Philippines) Zachary Taningco	DF	7+2	1	5	15
23	(The Gambia) David Sambou	DF	9+4	1	5	19
27	(Philippines) OJ Clarino	DF	5+5	0+1	0+3	12
28	(Philippines) Nelson Gasic	GK	1			1
29	(Philippines) Shirmar Felongco	MF	11+1	1	0+2	15
30	(Philippines) Charles Dabao III	DF	5+1		0+1	7
31	(United States) Christian Schaffner	DF	6+1	1		8
44	(Japan) Hayato Kame	MF	0+1			1
70	(Philippines) Justin Baas	MF	5		0+2	7
77	(China) Diao Su	FW	0+6		0+1	7
98	(Philippines) Troy Limbo	FW	11+4	0+1	0+1	17
99	(The Gambia) Mustapha Jallow	FW	1+2			3

=== Goalscorers ===
As of match played March 29, 2026

Rank	No.	Pos.	Player	Philippines Football League	AFC Champions League Two	AFC Challenge League	Total
1	15	MF	(The Gambia) Ousman Gai	21	0	5	26
2	11	FW	(The Gambia) Baboucarr Tourray	15	0	1	16
3	10	FW	(The Gambia) Saikou Ceesay	14	0	1	15
4	14	MF	(Philippines) Kenji Nishioka	10	0	1	11
5	5	FW	(Cameroon) Dilane Wamba	5	0	1	6
6	12	MF	(The Gambia) Modou Manneh	5	0	0	5
6	99	FW	(The Gambia) Mustapha Jallow	5	0	0	5
7	5	DF	(The Gambia) Modou Joof	2	1	1	4
9	2	DF	(Philippines) Jordan Jarvis	1	0	0	1
9	4	MF	(The Gambia) Assan Badjie	1	0	0	1
9	7	MF	(Sweden) Lars William Kvist	1	0	0	1
9	9	MF	(Japan) Yuga Watanabe	1	0	0	1
9	23	DF	(The Gambia) David Sambou	1	0	0	1
9	31	DF	(United States) Christian Schaffner	1	0	0	1
9	77	FW	(China) Diao Su	1	0	0	1
Totals				85	1	10	96

=== Assists ===
As of match played March 29, 2026

Rank	No.	Pos.	Player	Philippines Football League	AFC Champions League Two	AFC Challenge League	Total
1	9	MF	(Japan) Yuga Watanabe	11	0	0	11
2	14	MF	(Philippines) Kenji Nishioka	9	0	1	10
3	10	FW	(The Gambia) Saikou Ceesay	7	0	1	8
3	11	FW	(The Gambia) Baboucarr Tourray	6	0	1	8
5	15	MF	(The Gambia) Ousman Gai	5	0	2	7
6	12	MF	(The Gambia) Modou Manneh	3	0	2	5
7	2	DF	(Philippines) Jordan Jarvis	4	0	0	4
8	12	MF	(The Gambia) Modou Manneh	3	0	0	3
9	4	MF	(The Gambia) Assan Badjie	2	0	0	2
9	5	FW	(Cameroon) Dilane Wamba	2	0	0	2
9	19	DF	(Philippines) Johnmar Barsanilla	2	0	0	2
9	20	DF	(The Gambia) Modou Joof	2	0	0	2
9	30	DF	(Philippines) Charles Dabao III	2	0	0	2
9	70	MF	(Philippines) Justin Baas	2	0	0	2
9	98	FW	(Philippines) Troy Limbo	2	0	0	2
16	22	DF	(Philippines) Zachary Taningco	1	0	0	1
16	77	CF	(China) Diao Su	1	0	0	1
16	99	FW	(The Gambia) Mustapha Jallow	1	0	0	1
Totals				68	0	7	75

=== Clean Sheets ===
As of match played March 29, 2026

Rank	No.	Nat.	Player	Matches played	Goals against	Clean sheets				
Rank	No.	Nat.	Player	Matches played	Goals against	Philippines Football League	AFC Champions League Two	AFC Challenge League	Total	Clean sheet %
1	16	(The Gambia)	Omar Njie	14	12	5	0	2	6	50.0%
2	1	(Philippines)	Michael Asong	8	8	2	0	0	2	25.0%
3	28	(Philippines)	Nelson Gasic	1	0	1	0	0	1	100.0%
Totals				23	20	8	0	2	9	45.5%

=== Disciplinary Record ===
As of match played March 21, 2026

Rank	No.	Pos.	Player	Philippines Football League			AFC Champions League Two			AFC Challenge League			Total		
Rank	No.	Pos.	Player	Booked	(yellow card) (yellow-red card)	Sent off (straight red)	Booked	(yellow card) (yellow-red card)	Sent off (straight red)	Booked	(yellow card) (yellow-red card)	Sent off (straight red)	Booked	(yellow card) (yellow-red card)	Sent off (straight red)
1	15	MF	(The Gambia) Ousman Gai	4	0	0	0	0	0	2	0	0	6	0	0
2	20	DF	(The Gambia) David Sambou	3	0	0	1	0	0	0	0	0	4	0	0
3	12	MF	(The Gambia) Modou Manneh	3	0	0	0	0	0	0	0	0	3	0	0
4	5	DF	(The Gambia) Modou Joof	1	0	1	0	0	0	0	0	1	0	0	1
4	21	FW	(Cameroon) Dilane Wamba	1	0	0	0	0	0	1	0	0	2	0	0
4	29	MF	(Philippines) Shirmar Felongco	1	0	0	0	0	0	1	0	0	2	0	0
4	70	MF	(Philippines) Justin Baas	2	0	0	0	0	0	0	0	0	2	0	0
8	1	GK	(Philippines) Michael Asong	0	0	1	0	0	0	0	0	0	0	0	1
8	2	DF	(Philippines) Jordan Jarvis	1	0	0	0	0	0	0	0	0	1	0	0
8	7	MF	(Sweden) Lars Williiam Kvist	1	0	0	0	0	0	0	0	0	1	0	0
8	10	FW	(The Gambia) Saikou Ceesay	1	0	0	0	0	0	0	0	0	1	0	0
8	11	FW	(The Gambia) Baboucarr Touray	0	0	0	0	0	0	1	0	0	1	0	0
8	14	MF	(Philippines) Kenji Nishioka	0	0	0	0	0	0	1	0	0	1	0	0
8	16	GK	(The Gambia) Omar Njie	1	0	0	0	0	0	0	0	0	1	0	0
8	19	DF	(Philippines) Johnmar Barsanilla	1	0	0	0	0	0	0	0	0	1	0	0
8	27	DF	(Philippines) OJ Clarino	0	0	0	1	0	0	0	0	0	1	0	0
8	31	DF	(United States) Christian Schaffner	1	0	0	0	0	0	0	0	0	1	0	0

=== Hat-tricks ===
As of match played March 29, 2026

Player	Against	Result	Date	Competition
(The Gambia) Saikou Ceesay4	Valenzuela PB–Mendiola	9–2 (A)	August 30, 2025	Philippines Football League
(The Gambia) Baboucarr Touray	Tuloy	8–2 (H)	October 5, 2025	Philippines Football League
(The Gambia) Saikou Ceesay4	Philippine Army	8–0 (A)	November 29, 2025	Philippines Football League
(The Gambia) Baboucarr Touray	Valenzuela PB–Mendiola	12–0 (H)	February 11, 2026	Philippines Football League
(The Gambia) Mustapha Jallow4	Valenzuela PB–Mendiola	12–0 (H)	February 11, 2026	Philippines Football League
(The Gambia) Ousman Gai	Don Bosco Garelli United	6–1 (H)	February 25, 2026	Philippines Football League
(The Gambia) Ousman Gai6	Tuloy	14–0 (A)	March 25, 2026	Philippines Football League
(The Gambia) Ousman Gai6	Philippine Army	10–0 (H)	March 29, 2026	Philippines Football League

4 - Player scored 4 goals 6 - Player scored 6 goals
