= 2024–25 Philippines Football League Finals Series =

2024–25 PFL Finals Series
Tournament details
- Country: Philippines
- Dates: April 26 – May 4, 2025
- Teams: 4

Final positions
- Champions: Dynamic Herb Cebu; 1st title
- Runners-up: Manila Digger
- Semifinalists: Kaya–Iloilo; One Taguig

Tournament statistics
- Matches played: 3
- Goals scored: 7 (2.33 per match)
- Top goal scorer: Abou Sy (2 goals)

The 2024–25 Philippines Football League Finals Series was a post-season tournament of the Philippines Football League (PFL). It is a distinct tournament which followed the 2024–25 PFL season. This was in contrast to the Finals Series of the 2017 PFL season, which was held to determine the inaugural league champions.

The 2024–25 league champions Kaya–Iloilo, along with the three next highest-placed teams in the league table, qualified for this tournament which began on April 26, 2025, and concluded on May 4, 2025. Dynamic Herb Cebu defeated Manila Digger 1–0 in the final to win its first PFL Finals Series, and will represent the Philippines at the 2025–26 ASEAN Club Championship.

== Qualified teams ==
The Final Series was contested by four teams. Dynamic Herb Cebu was the last team to secure qualification on April 12, 2025.

- Kaya–Iloilo
- Manila Digger
- One Taguig
- Dynamic Herb Cebu

== League table ==
Top 4
Pos	Team	Pld	W	D	L	GF	GA	GD	Pts	Qualification
1	Kaya–Iloilo (C)	18	14	2	2	48	15	+33	44	Qualification for the 2025–26 AFC Champions League Two Group stage
2	Manila Digger	18	14	1	3	56	10	+46	43	Qualification for the 2025–26 AFC Champions League Two Qualifying play-offs
3	One Taguig	18	10	3	5	39	13	+26	33	
4	Dynamic Herb Cebu	18	9	4	5	33	18	+15	31	Qualification for the 2025–26 ASEAN Club Championship Qualifying play-offs (Note: Qualified for 2025–26 ASEAN Club Championship Qualifying play-offs as the 2024–25 Philippines Football League Finals Series winners.)

Source: Matchday+
(C) Champions

== Finals Series ==
External videos
- 2024–25 Philippines Football League Golden Ticket Final
- PFL Season 2024-2025 - Manila Digger vs. Dynamic Herb Cebu (Part 1 and 2) by the Philippines Football Federation

The top-seeded team in the regular season played the fourth-seeded team in the semifinal. The second-seeded team played the third-seeded team in the other semifinal. The winners of both semifinals played in the "Golden Ticket Final".

Semi-finals
1	Kaya–Iloilo	1
4	Dynamic Herb Cebu	2
2	Manila Digger	2
3	One Taguig	1

PFL Golden Ticket Final
4	Dynamic Herb Cebu	1
2	Manila Digger	0

=== Semifinals ===
April 26, 2025
17:00

Kaya–Iloilo	1–2	Dynamic Herb Cebu
Bedic 66' (pen.)	Report	Sy 32', 53'

MOA Football Pitch, Pasay
April 26, 2025
20:00

Manila Digger	2–1	One Taguig
Ceesay 63'; Gai 83'	Report	Gai 45+3' (o.g.)

MOA Football Pitch, Pasay

=== Golden Ticket Final ===
May 4, 2025
21:17

Dynamic Herb Cebu	1–0	Manila Digger
Mijland 15'

MOA Football Pitch, Pasay
Referee: Clifford Daypuyat

Dynamic Herb Cebu	Manila Digger

GK	1	(Philippines) Jun Badelic (c)
DF	3	(Philippines) Charles Dabao
DF	37	(Turkey) Göktuğ Demiroğlu
DF	14	(Philippines) Jaime Rosquillo	(yellow card) 90+10'
DF	4	(Philippines) Kamil Amirul
MF	12	(Philippines) Kainoa Bailey
MF	55	(Brazil) Gabriel Silva
MF	80	(Ivory Coast) Marius Kore	(substituted off) 63'
MF	20	(Philippines) Roberto Corsame	(yellow card) 30'
FW	7	(Netherlands) Guytho Mijland	(substituted off) 63'
FW	77	(Cameroon) Abou Sy	(substituted off) 79'
Substitutes:
	17	(Japan) Ryoo Togashi	(substituted on) 63'
	21	(Japan) Rintaro Hama	(substituted on) 79'
	88	(Brazil) Magson Dourado	(substituted on) 63'
Head Coach:
(Philippines) Glenn Ramos

GK	1	(Philippines) Michael Asong
DF	20	(Philippines) Dean Ebarle (c)	(yellow card) 90+8'
DF	5	(The Gambia) Modou Joof	(yellow card) 62'
DF	17	(Philippines) Jordan Jarvis	(substituted off) 85'
DF	24	(Philippines) Zachary Taningco
MF	12	(The Gambia) Modou Manneh
MF	23	(Philippines) Kenji Nishioka
MF	15	(The Gambia) Ousman Gai	(yellow card) 8'
FW	13	(Philippines) Eric Giganto	(substituted off) 35'
FW	30	(Cameroon) Kevin Ebene Moukouta	(substituted off) 85'
FW	4	(Cameroon) Dilane Wamba	(substituted off) 73'
Substitutes:
	6	(Ghana) Daniel Ashley	(substituted on) 85'
	7	(Philippines) Jim Ashley Flores	(substituted on) 85'
	8	(Nigeria) Ifeanyi Ugwu	(substituted on) 73'
	57	(Philippines) Dylan de Bruycker	(yellow card) 80'	(substituted on) 35'
Head Coach:
(Philippines) Kim Versales

== Statistics ==
=== Goalscorers ===
Rank	Player	Team	SF	F	Total
1	(Senegal) Abou Sy	Dynamic Herb Cebu	2		2
2	(Philippines) Jovin Bedic	Kaya–Iloilo	1		1
2	(The Gambia) Saikou Ceesay	Manila Digger	1		1
2	(The Gambia) Ousman Gai	Manila Digger	1		1
2	(Netherlands) Guytho Mijland	Dynamic Herb Cebu		1	1
