= 2024–25 Philippines Football League =

Philippines Football League
- Season: 2024–25
- Dates: September 28, 2024 – April 13, 2025
- Champions: Kaya–Iloilo; 3rd title
- Champions League Two: Kaya–Iloilo; Manila Digger
- ASEAN Club Championship: Dynamic Herb Cebu
- Matches: 90
- Goals: 307 (3.41 per match)
- Top goalscorer: Saikou Ceesay (16 goals)
- Best goalkeeper: Jun Badelic (7 clean sheets)
- Biggest home win: Kaya–Iloilo 9–1 Mendiola 1991 (November 23)
- Biggest away win: Mendiola 1991 0–10 Manila Digger (February 17)
- Highest scoring: Kaya–Iloilo 9–1 Mendiola 1991 (November 23); Philippine YNT 1–9 Manila Digger (February 2); Mendiola 1991 0–10 Manila Digger (February 17)
- Longest winning run: Kaya–Iloilo (Oct 19 – Feb 9) (8 matches)
- Longest unbeaten run: Kaya–Iloilo (Oct 6 – Apr 14) (9 matches)
- Longest winless run: Mendiola 1991 (Sept 29 – Feb 17) (11 matches)
- Longest losing run: Philippine YNT (Jan 19 – Mar 11) (7 matches)

The 2024–25 Philippines Football League was the seventh season of the Philippines Football League (PFL), the professional football league of the Philippines. Ten teams participated this season which began on September 28, 2024 and ended on April 13, 2025. The Finals Series, a distinct competition featuring the top 4 teams in the league table was held after the conclusion of the season.

Defending champions Kaya–Iloilo won their third consecutive league title.

== Format changes ==
The league would shift once more to an inter-year format, reverting to a double round-robin that would see the teams play each other twice. The season would also see the return of the Finals Series that was previously implemented in the 2017 season, with the top four qualifying for a knockout round series that would culminate in a final. However, in contrast to the 2017 season, the table topper at the end of league play is the league champion and will earn automatic qualification for the group stage of the 2025–26 AFC Champions League Two, with second place also earning a qualifying play-off spot in the same tournament.

Qualification for the 2025–26 ASEAN Club Championship will be determined through the Finals Series.

== Teams ==
Ten teams from the previous season were set to participate for the 2024–25 season. Don Bosco Garelli, Manila Montet, Philippine Air Force, Philippine Army, and Tuloy would not participate in the season. Furthermore, before the season began, United City withdrew from the competition citing financial issues.

The league announced the roster of teams in early September, also announced the participation of the Philippine national youth team as the PFF Developmental Team, similar to the previous Azkals Development Team that had participated in the PFL from 2020 to 2023.

| Team | Location (Note: General location where the club is based in. Only select clubs have their own/designated home stadium.) |
|---|---|
| Davao Aguilas | Tagum, Davao del Norte |
| Dynamic Herb Cebu | Talisay, Cebu |
| Kaya–Iloilo | Iloilo City, Iloilo |
| Loyola | Manila, Metro Manila |
| Maharlika Taguig | Taguig, Metro Manila |
| Manila Digger | Taguig, Metro Manila |
| Mendiola 1991 | Imus, Cavite |
| One Taguig | Taguig, Metro Manila |
| Philippine YNT | Carmona, Cavite |
| Stallion Laguna | Biñan, Laguna |

== Stadiums ==
For the first round of the league, matches were mainly held at the Rizal Memorial Stadium, with the Dynamic Herb Sports Complex, the home venue of Dynamic Herb Cebu, also hosting the club's match against One Taguig on November 3.

In January 2025, Rizal Memorial Stadium went under pitch renovation in preparation for the AFC Asian Cup qualifiers, with the league subsequently splitting the hosting of matches between the UP Diliman Football Field and the Biñan Football Stadium. The Iloilo Sports Complex of Kaya–Iloilo also held matches during the season.

| 2024–25 Philippines Football League is located in Philippines | Manila | Quezon City | Iloilo City |
| 2024–25 Philippines Football League is located in Philippines | Rizal Memorial Stadium | UP Diliman Football Field | Iloilo Sports Complex |
| 2024–25 Philippines Football League is located in Philippines | Capacity: 12,873 | Capacity: 300 | Capacity: 7,000 |
| 2024–25 Philippines Football League is located in Philippines | Biñan | Talisay, Cebu | |
| 2024–25 Philippines Football League is located in Philippines | Biñan Football Stadium | Dynamic Herb Sports Complex | |
| 2024–25 Philippines Football League is located in Philippines | Capacity: 2,580 | Capacity: 550 | |

== Personnel and kits ==
| Team | Head coach | Captain | Kit manufacturer | Sponsors |
|---|---|---|---|---|
| Davao Aguilas | (Philippines) Aber Ruzgal | (Ivory Coast) Dini Ouattara | Chronos Athletics | University of Makati^{1}, SpeedRegalo^{2}, BRODO^{2}, Wit.id^{2} |
| Dynamic Herb Cebu | (Philippines) Glenn Ramos | (Philippines) Florencio Badelic | RAD Apparel | Leylam^{1} |
| Kaya–Iloilo | (Japan) Yu Hoshide | (Philippines) Audie Menzi | LGR Sportswear | LBC^{1} |
| Loyola | (Portugal) Paulo Jorge Silva | (Philippines) Curt Dizon | Chronos Athletics | Elan Vita^{1} |
| Maharlika Taguig | (South Korea) Jung Dong-gyu | (Cameroon) Serge Kaole | Chronos Athletics | AIA^{1} |
| Manila Digger | (Spain) Juan Manuel Saez | (Philippines) Dean Ebarle | UCAN | Zealand Metal Corporation^{1}, OKFly^{2} |
| Mendiola 1991 | (Japan) Yuki Matsuda | (Iran) Hamed Hajimehdi | Ropa | Vill-Mell Trading^{2}, Mr. Freeze^{2} |
| One Taguig | (Philippines) Arvin Soliman | (Philippines) Arnel Amita | Azkals Sportswear | Chooks-to-Go^{2}, PAGSS^{2}, I Love Taguig^{3} |
| Philippine YNT | (Spain) Sergi Mascarell | (Philippines) Harry Nuñez | Skechers | Skechers^{1} |
| Stallion Laguna | (Philippines) Ernest Nierras | (Philippines) Matthew Nierras | Blaze Athletics | Giligan's Restaurant^{1}, Pythos^{2}, SCID^{2} |

Notes:

1. Located on the front of the shirt.
2. Located on the back of the shirt.
3. Located on the sleeves.
4. Located on the shorts.

=== Coaching changes ===
| Team | Outgoing coach | Manner of departure | Date of vacancy | Position in table | Incoming coach | Date of appointment |
|---|---|---|---|---|---|---|
| Manila Digger | (Philippines) Pong Liman | | August 31, 2024 | Pre-season | (Spain) Oriol Mohedano | September 1, 2024 |
| Dynamic Herb Cebu | (Turkey) Memiş Özata | Mutual consent | August 23, 2024 | Pre-season | (Turkey) Mustafa Göksu | September 5, 2024 |
| Maharlika Taguig | (Nigeria) Lerche Njang | | August 2024 | Pre-season | (Romania) Marian Mihail | September 26, 2024 |
| Loyola | (Philippines) Roxy Dorlas | Demoted to assistant manager | September 2024 | Pre-season | (South Korea) Kim Chul-soo | September 28, 2024 |
| Mendiola 1991 | (Philippines) Dan Padernal | | September 2024 | Pre-season | (Japan) Yuki Matsuda | September 29, 2024 |
| Manila Digger | (Spain) Oriol Mohedano | | November 16, 2024 | 2nd | (Spain) Juan Manuel Saez | November 16, 2024 |
| Maharlika Taguig | (Romania) Marian Mihail | Change of club ownership | January 21, 2025 | 9th | (South Korea) Jung Dong-gyu | January 21, 2025 |
| Dynamic Herb Cebu | (Turkey) Mustafa Göksu | End of contract | January 15, 2025 | 3rd | (Philippines) Glenn Ramos | February 1, 2025 |
| Loyola | (South Korea) Kim Chul-soo | Mutual consent | November 2024 | 9th | (Portugal) Paulo Jorge Silva | February 8, 2025 |
| One Taguig | (Philippines) Jovanie Villagracia | Resigned | April 1, 2025 | 3rd | (Philippines) Arvin Soliman | April 6, 2025 |

== Foreign players ==
Players name in bold indicates the player was registered during the mid-season transfer window.

| Team | Players | | | | | | | Former players^{1} |
|---|---|---|---|---|---|---|---|---|
| Davao Aguilas | (Brazil) **Victor Cabral** | (Brazil) Gabriel Costa | (Mali) **Issa Diallo** | (Indonesia) **Syendio Fernanda** | (Ivory Coast) Yohann Fofana | (Senegal) **Robert Lopez Mendy** | (Nigeria) **Lukman Hussein** | (Brazil) Bruno Krenkel (Brazil) Lucas Reis (The Gambia) Salifu Jatta (Indonesia) Dino Tri Laksana (Japan) Takuto Miki (Canada) Alessandro Riggi |
| Davao Aguilas | (South Korea) Mun Jun-su | (Ivory Coast) Dini Ouattara | (Mexico) Salvador Pliego | (Lithuania) **Mantvydas Tikstinskis** | (Indonesia) Zavier Zakarya | | | (Brazil) Bruno Krenkel (Brazil) Lucas Reis (The Gambia) Salifu Jatta (Indonesia) Dino Tri Laksana (Japan) Takuto Miki (Canada) Alessandro Riggi |
| Dynamic Herb Cebu | (Netherlands) Yusuf Çekiç | (Turkey) **Göktuğ Demiroğlu** | (Brazil) **Magson Dourado** | (Japan) Rintaro Hama | (Japan) **Hiromasa Ishikawa** | (Ivory Coast) Marius Kore | (Netherlands) Guytho Mijland | (Brazil) Daniel Alemão (Suriname) Zamoranho Ho-A-Tham (Japan) Masaya Kobayashi (United States) Sam Strong (Turkey) Berke Önde (Turkey) Ali Yanık |
| Dynamic Herb Cebu | (Brazil) **Gabriel Silva** | (Senegal) Abou Sy | (Japan) Ryoo Togashi | | | | | (Brazil) Daniel Alemão (Suriname) Zamoranho Ho-A-Tham (Japan) Masaya Kobayashi (United States) Sam Strong (Turkey) Berke Önde (Turkey) Ali Yanık |
| Kaya–Iloilo | (Ghana) **Ernest Barfo** | (United States) **Alfredo Cortez** | (Ghana) Eric Esso | (Mali) Bandiougou Konate | (Japan) Kaishu Yamazaki | (Japan) Shuto Komaki | (Japan) Akito Saito | (Spain) Walid Birrou (Japan) Daizo Horikoshi (Senegal) Robert Lopez Mendy (South Korea) Park Yi-young |
| Loyola | (Netherlands) Djumaney Burnet | (Mongolia) Filip Chinzorig | (Guam) Leon Morimoto | (Japan) **Koki Narita** | (Japan) **Natsu Okamoto** | (Portugal) Anderson Pinto | (Japan) **Kazuha Sudo** | (Canada) Matt Silva (Netherlands) Nino de Leeuw (Senegal) Alassane Wade |
| Maharlika Taguig | (Ivory Coast) **Franck Anoh** | (United States) **Shayan Charalaghi** | (Chinese Taipei) **Chen Ting-hao** | (Cameroon) Darlton Digha | (Cameroon) Serge Kaole | (Chinese Taipei) **Kai Hsiang-lin** | (Cameroon) **Desmond Ngai** | (Ivory Coast) Koffi Bini (Sierra Leone) John Kamara (South Korea) Mun Te-su (Cameroon) James Sunday |
| Maharlika Taguig | (Denmark) **Sebastian Nielsen** | (Australia) **Cooper Ross** | (The Gambia) Ahmad Saidy | (Barbados) **Terence Smith** | (Chinese Taipei) **Yu Chun-hsiang** | | | (Ivory Coast) Koffi Bini (Sierra Leone) John Kamara (South Korea) Mun Te-su (Cameroon) James Sunday |
| Manila Digger | (Brazil) Abner | (Ghana) Daniel Ashley | (The Gambia) Saikou Ceesay | (China) Diao Su | (Cameroon) **Kevin Ebene Moukouta** | (The Gambia) Ousman Gai | (The Gambia) Modou Joof | (Japan) Yuya Kuriyama (Israel) Robert Gingichashvili |
| Manila Digger | (Japan) Hayato Kame | (The Gambia) Modou Manneh | (Nigeria) Ifeanyi Ugwu | (Cameroon) Dilane Wamba | (Brazil) **Johnny Wesley** | | | (Japan) Yuya Kuriyama (Israel) Robert Gingichashvili |
| Mendiola 1991 | (Iran) Milad Behgandom | (United States) **Edison Castro** | (Canada) **Nick Fuzesi** | (Israel) **Robert Gingichashvili** | (Iran) **Behnam Habibi** | (Ghana) **Marlle Habila** | (Uganda) **Allan Kiggundu** | (Italy) Léo Anthony (Iran) Mohammad Darabi (Lebanon) Ali Ghamloush (Brazil) Gustavo (Lebanon) Jangobah Johnson (Iran) Kourosh Manesh (Iran) Amir Memari (Iran) Amir Moayedizadeh (Iran) Peyman Nasirizadeh |
| Mendiola 1991 | (Iran) Hamed Hajimehdi | (Jordan) **Habes Mubarak** | (Uganda) **Isaac Doka** | (Spain) **Tarsicio Onyebuchi** | (South Korea) **Park Seo-yeom** | (Iran) **Shabab Pira** | (Japan) **Yuta Tochigi** | (Italy) Léo Anthony (Iran) Mohammad Darabi (Lebanon) Ali Ghamloush (Brazil) Gustavo (Lebanon) Jangobah Johnson (Iran) Kourosh Manesh (Iran) Amir Memari (Iran) Amir Moayedizadeh (Iran) Peyman Nasirizadeh |
| One Taguig | (Argentina) Nahuel Amarilla | (Cameroon) Henri Bandeken | (Japan) Naoto Hiraishi | (Ghana) **Kofi Kordzi** | (Switzerland) **Patrick Lingg** | (Norway) Peter Nergaard | (Cameroon) Junior Ngong Sam | |
| One Taguig | (Nigeria) Solomon Okereke | (Japan) So Omae | (Japan) Shoma Sato | (Japan) Tsukasa Shimomura | (Australia) **Nicholas Simpson** | (Japan) **Yusuke Unoki** | | |
| Philippine YNT | No foreign players registered | | | | | | | |
| Stallion Laguna | (United States) **Gabriel Claudio** | (Mexico) Alonzo del Mundo | (Ghana) Stephen Halm | (United States) Fahmi Ibrahim | (South Korea) Lee Seung-won | (United States) Roberto Llamas | (United States) Victor Parra | (Brazil) Magson Dourado (Cameroon) Kevin Ebene Moukouta (Argentina) Cristián Ivanobski (Australia) Nicholas Simpson (Barbados) Terence Smith (Brazil) Johnny Wesley (United States) Brandon Zambrano |
| Stallion Laguna | (United States) Abraham Placito | (Argentina) Ricardo Sendra | (Japan) **Yuji Takatoku** | (Mexico) Juan Trujillo | (Ghana) **David Yeboah** | | | (Brazil) Magson Dourado (Cameroon) Kevin Ebene Moukouta (Argentina) Cristián Ivanobski (Australia) Nicholas Simpson (Barbados) Terence Smith (Brazil) Johnny Wesley (United States) Brandon Zambrano |

- **^1** Former players only include players who left after the start of the 2024–25 season.

== League table ==
| Pos | Team | Pld | W | D | L | GF | GA | GD | Pts | Qualification |
|---|---|---|---|---|---|---|---|---|---|---|
| 1 | Kaya–Iloilo (C) | 18 | 14 | 2 | 2 | 48 | 15 | +33 | 44 | Qualification for the 2025–26 AFC Champions League Two Group stage |
| 2 | Manila Digger | 18 | 14 | 1 | 3 | 56 | 10 | +46 | 43 | Qualification for the 2025–26 AFC Champions League Two Qualifying play-offs |
| 3 | One Taguig | 18 | 10 | 3 | 5 | 39 | 13 | +26 | 33 | |
| 4 | Dynamic Herb Cebu | 18 | 9 | 4 | 5 | 33 | 18 | +15 | 31 | Qualification for the 2025–26 ASEAN Club Championship Qualifying play-offs (Note: Qualified for 2025–26 ASEAN Club Championship Qualifying play-offs as the 2024–25 Philippines Football League Finals Series winners.) |
| 5 | Stallion Laguna | 18 | 8 | 3 | 7 | 36 | 25 | +11 | 27 | |
| 6 | Davao Aguilas | 18 | 7 | 4 | 7 | 24 | 16 | +8 | 25 | |
| 7 | Maharlika Taguig | 18 | 5 | 3 | 10 | 21 | 37 | −16 | 18 | |
| 8 | Loyola | 18 | 5 | 2 | 11 | 20 | 39 | −19 | 17 | |
| 9 | Philippine YNT | 18 | 3 | 4 | 11 | 16 | 49 | −33 | 13 | |
| 10 | Mendiola 1991 | 18 | 1 | 2 | 15 | 14 | 85 | −71 | 5 | |

Source: Matchday+
(C) Champions

== Positions by round ==
| Team ╲ Round | 1 | 2 | 3 | 4 | 5 | 6 | 7 | 8 | 9 | 10 | 11 | 12 | 13 | 14 | 15 | 16 | 17 | 18 |
|---|---|---|---|---|---|---|---|---|---|---|---|---|---|---|---|---|---|---|
| Davao Aguilas | 3 | 4 | 6 | 6 | 6 | 6 | 6 | 6 | 7 | 7 | 7 | 6 | 6 | 6 | 6 | 6 | 6 | 6 |
| Dynamic Herb Cebu | 1 | 1 | 3 | 4 | 4 | 4 | 3 | 5 | 3 | 3 | 3 | 5 | 5 | 5 | 4 | 5 | 4 | 4 |
| Kaya–Iloilo | 5 | 3 | 2 | 1 | 1 | 1 | 1 | 1 | 1 | 1 | 1 | 1 | 1 | 1 | 1 | 1 | 1 | 1 |
| Loyola | 9 | 8 | 8 | 9 | 9 | 8 | 7 | 7 | 6 | 6 | 6 | 7 | 7 | 7 | 7 | 7 | 7 | 8 |
| Maharlika Taguig | 8 | 6 | 7 | 7 | 7 | 9 | 9 | 9 | 8 | 8 | 8 | 8 | 8 | 8 | 8 | 8 | 8 | 7 |
| Manila Digger | 6 | 5 | 4 | 2 | 2 | 2 | 2 | 2 | 2 | 2 | 2 | 2 | 2 | 2 | 2 | 2 | 2 | 2 |
| Mendiola 1991 | 10 | 10 | 10 | 10 | 10 | 10 | 10 | 10 | 10 | 10 | 10 | 10 | 10 | 10 | 10 | 10 | 10 | 10 |
| One Taguig | 4 | 7 | 5 | 5 | 3 | 3 | 4 | 3 | 4 | 4 | 4 | 3 | 3 | 3 | 3 | 3 | 3 | 3 |
| Philippine YNT | 7 | 9 | 9 | 8 | 8 | 7 | 8 | 8 | 9 | 9 | 9 | 9 | 9 | 9 | 9 | 9 | 9 | 9 |
| Stallion Laguna | 2 | 2 | 1 | 3 | 5 | 5 | 5 | 4 | 5 | 5 | 5 | 4 | 4 | 4 | 5 | 4 | 5 | 5 |

| Finals Series |

Source: PFL

== Results by round ==
| Team \ Round | 1 | 2 | 3 | 4 | 5 | 6 | 7 | 8 | 9 | 10 | 11 | 12 | 13 | 14 | 15 | 16 | 17 | 18 |
|---|---|---|---|---|---|---|---|---|---|---|---|---|---|---|---|---|---|---|
| Davao Aguilas | W | D | L | L | W | L | L | W | L | L | W | W | W | D | L | D | W | D |
| Dynamic Herb Cebu | W | W | L | D | W | W | D | L | W | L | W | L | D | W | W | L | W | D |
| Kaya–Iloilo | D | W | W | W | W | W | W | W | W | L | W | W | L | W | W | W | D | W |
| Loyola | L | L | W | L | L | W | D | W | W | W | L | L | L | D | L | L | L | L |
| Maharlika Taguig | L | W | L | D | L | L | D | L | W | D | L | L | L | W | L | W | L | W |
| Manila Digger | L | W | W | W | W | W | L | W | W | W | W | W | L | W | W | W | D | W |
| Mendiola 1991 | L | L | L | L | L | L | D | L | L | L | L | W | L | D | L | L | L | L |
| One Taguig | W | L | W | D | W | W | L | W | L | W | L | W | D | W | D | L | W | W |
| Philippine YNT | L | L | D | W | L | W | L | L | L | L | L | L | L | D | D | D | W | L |
| Stallion Laguna | W | W | W | L | L | L | W | W | D | L | W | W | D | D | L | W | L | L |

== Results ==
| Home \ Away | DAV | DHC | KAY | LFC | MAH | MAD | MEN | PYT | TAG | STA |
|---|---|---|---|---|---|---|---|---|---|---|
| Davao Aguilas | — | 2–3 | 1–1 | 0–1 | 0–2 | 0–1 | 3–0 | 0–0 | 1–2 | 1–1 |
| Dynamic Herb Cebu | 1–1 | — | 1–2 | 3–1 | 3–0 | 0–1 | 3–1 | 4–0 | 0–0 (Note: Match was originally scheduled for October 27 but was postponed to November 3 due to Tropical Storm Trami (Kristine).) | 1–0 |
| Kaya–Iloilo | 0–1 | 3–1 | — | 3–2 (Note: Match was originally scheduled for October 27 but was postponed to November 13 due to Tropical Storm Trami (Kristine).) | 4–1 | 1–1 | 9–1 | 4–1 | 2–0 | 2–0 |
| Loyola | 0–3 (Note: Match was initially scheduled for September 28 as the opening match of the league, but was postponed. The league later deemed the result a 3–0 win in favor of Davao.) | 2–2 | 0–1 | — | 1–4 | 0–5 | 0–1 | 2–0 | 0–2 | 2–2 |
| Maharlika Taguig | 0–4 | 0–1 | 1–2 | 0–1 | — | 1–5 (Note: Match was originally scheduled for October 26 but was postponed to November 12 due to Tropical Storm Trami (Kristine).) | 3–3 | 0–0 | 0–5 | 1–4 |
| Manila Digger | 1–0 | 2–1 | 1–0 | 4–0 | 0–1 | — | 4–0 | 7–1 | 1–3 | 0–1 |
| Mendiola 1991 | 0–3 | 0–6 | 2–6 | 2–3 | 0–5 | 0–10 | — | 2–2 | 0–5 | 0–6 |
| Philippine YNT | 3–1 | 0–2 | 0–2 | 2–1 | 1–2 | 1–9 | 3–1 (Note: Match was originally scheduled for October 26 but was postponed to November 12 due to Tropical Storm Trami (Kristine).) | — | 1–1 | 2–3 |
| One Taguig | 0–2 | 0–0 | 0–1 | 5–1 | 3–0 | 0–1 | 7–0 | 1–0 | — | 0–2 |
| Stallion Laguna | 0–1 (Note: Match was originally scheduled for October 27 but was postponed to November 13 due to Tropical Storm Trami (Kristine).) | 3–1 | 1–5 | 0–3 | 0–0 | 0–3 | 8–1 | 4–0 | 1–2 | — |

Source: PFL
Legend: Blue = home team win; Yellow = draw; Red = away team win.
For upcoming matches, an "a" indicates there is an article about the rivalry between the two participants.

== Season statistics ==
=== Top goalscorers ===
As of 13 April 2025

| Rank | Player | Team | Goals |
|---|---|---|---|
| 1 | (The Gambia) Saikou Ceesay | Manila Digger | 16 |
| 2 | (The Gambia) Modou Manneh | Manila Digger | 12 |
| 3 | (Japan) Shuto Komaki | Kaya–Iloilo | 11 |
| 3 | (Philippines) Griffin McDaniel | Stallion Laguna | 11 |
| 5 | (Philippines) Rico Andes | Loyola | 9 |
| 5 | (The Gambia) Ousman Gai | Manila Digger | 9 |
| 7 | (Brazil) Gabriel Costa | Davao Aguilas | 8 |
| 7 | (Japan) Tsukasa Shimomura | One Taguig | 8 |
| 7 | (Senegal) Abou Sy | Dynamic Herb Cebu | 8 |
| 10 | (Senegal) Robert Lopez Mendy | Kaya–Iloilo; Davao Aguilas | 7 |
| 10 | (Cameroon) Junior Ngong Sam | One Taguig | 7 |

=== Top assists ===
As of 13 April 2025

| Rank | Player | Team | Assists |
|---|---|---|---|
| 1 | (The Gambia) Ousman Gai | Manila Digger | 10 |
| 2 | (Cameroon) Junior Ngong Sam | One Taguig | 9 |
| 3 | (Philippines) Oliver Bias | One Taguig | 7 |
| 3 | (Japan) Shuto Komaki | Kaya–Iloilo | 7 |
| 5 | (The Gambia) Modou Manneh | Manila Digger | 6 |
| 5 | (Philippines) Griffin McDaniel | Stallion Laguna | 6 |
| 5 | (Philippines) Zachary Taningco | Manila Digger | 6 |
| 8 | (Philippines) Pocholo Bugas | Kaya–Iloilo | 5 |
| 8 | (Philippines) Dean Ebarle | Manila Digger | 5 |
| 8 | (Philippines) Eric Giganto | Manila Digger | 5 |
| 8 | (Japan) Naoto Hiraishi | One Taguig | 5 |
| 8 | (Netherlands) Guytho Mijland | Dynamic Herb Cebu | 5 |

=== Own goals ===
As of 13 April 2024

| Rank | Player | Team | Own goals |
|---|---|---|---|
| 1 | (Philippines) Pete Forrosuelo | Loyola | 1 |
| 1 | (Cameroon) James Sunday | Maharlika Taguig | 1 |

=== Hat-tricks ===
As of 1 March 2025

| Player | Team | Result | Against | Date |
|---|---|---|---|---|
| (The Gambia) Saikou Ceesay | Manila Digger | 4–0 (H) | Loyola | 9 November 2024 |
| (Japan) Shuto Komaki | Kaya–Iloilo | 9–1 (H) | Mendiola 1991 | 23 November 2024 |
| (The Gambia) Ahmad Saidy | Maharlika Taguig | 3–3 (H) | Mendiola 1991 | 30 November 2024 |
| (Philippines) Griffin McDaniel^{4} | Stallion Laguna | 8–1 (H) | Mendiola 1991 | 1 February 2025 |
| (The Gambia) Saikou Ceesay^{6} | Manila Digger | 9–1 (A) | Philippine YNT | 2 February 2025 |
| (Cameroon) Dilane Wamba | Manila Digger | 10–0 (A) | Mendiola 1991 | 17 February 2025 |
| (Cameroon) Kevin Ebene Moukouta^{4} | Manila Digger | 7–1 (H) | Philippine YNT | 1 March 2025 |

Note

(H) – Home; (A) – Away ^{4} Player scored four goals
^{6} Player scored six goals

=== Clean sheets ===
As of 13 April 2025

| Rank | Player | Team | Clean sheets |
|---|---|---|---|
| 1 | (Philippines) Florencio Badelic | Dynamic Herb Cebu | 7 |
| 2 | (Philippines) Michael Asong | Manila Digger | 6 |
| 2 | (Ivory Coast) Dini Ouattara | Davao Aguilas | 6 |
| 4 | (Philippines) Quincy Kammeraad | One Taguig | 5 |
| 4 | (United States) Roberto Llamas | Stallion Laguna | 5 |
| 6 | (Philippines) Kenry Balobo | Maharlika Taguig | 4 |
| 6 | (Cameroon) Henri Bandeken | One Taguig | 4 |
| 6 | (Japan) Yuya Kuriyama | Manila Digger | 4 |
| 6 | (Philippines) Jessie Semblante | Loyola | 4 |
| 10 | (Philippines) Jhon Betanio | Davao Aguilas | 3 |
| 10 | (United States) Alfredo Cortez | Kaya–Iloilo | 3 |

=== Red cards ===
As of 6 April 2025

| Rank | Player | Team | Red cards |
|---|---|---|---|
| 1 | (Philippines) Roberto Corsame | Dynamic Herb Cebu | 2 |
| 1 | (Ghana) Eric Esso | Kaya–Iloilo | 2 |
| 1 | (Iran) Hamed Hajimehdi | Mendiola 1991 | 2 |
| 4 | (Philippines) James Demate | Philippine YNT | 1 |
| 4 | (The Gambia) Ousman Gai | Manila Digger | 1 |
| 4 | (Philippines) Daniel Gadia | Dynamic Herb Cebu | 1 |
| 4 | (Philippines) Pete Forrosuelo | Loyola | 1 |
| 4 | (Ghana) Marlle Habila | Mendiola 1991 | 1 |
| 4 | (Ghana) Stephen Halm | Stallion Laguna | 1 |
| 4 | (United States) Fahmi Ibrahim | Stallion Laguna | 1 |
| 4 | (Brazil) Allan Machado | Davao Aguilas | 1 |
| 4 | (The Gambia) Modou Manneh | Manila Digger | 1 |
| 4 | (South Korea) Mun Jun-su | Davao Aguilas | 1 |
| 4 | (Iran) Shabab Pira | Mendiola 1991 | 1 |
| 4 | (United States) Abraham Placito | Stallion Laguna | 1 |
| 4 | (Brazil) Lucas Reis | Davao Aguilas | 1 |
| 4 | (Philippines) John Renz Saldivar | Maharlika Taguig | 1 |
| 4 | (Australia) Nicholas Simpson | Stallion Laguna | 1 |
| 4 | (Philippines) Kart Talaroc | Davao Aguilas | 1 |
| 4 | (Japan) Ryoo Togashi | Dynamic Herb Cebu | 1 |
| 4 | (Mexico) Juan Trujillo | Stallion Laguna | 1 |
| 4 | (Philippines) Reynald Villareal | Davao Aguilas | 1 |

== Awards ==
The following awards were given to players after the conclusion of the regular season. The awardees were presented large placards in lieu of the customary trophies, a move which received negative reception online.

| Award | Winner | Club |
|---|---|---|
| Golden Ball | (Japan) Shuto Komaki | Kaya–Iloilo |
| Golden Boot | (The Gambia) Saikou Ceesay | Manila Digger |
| Golden Glove | (Philippines) Florencio Badelic | Dynamic Herb Cebu |
