= 2025–26 AFC Challenge League group stage =

Asia tertiary club football tournament

The 2025–26 AFC Challenge League group stage was played from 25 October to 1 November 2025. The top two teams from each group qualified for the knockout stage.

== Draw ==
The draw for the group stage took place on 28 August at the AFC House in Kuala Lumpur, Malaysia. The 20 teams were drawn into five groups: three comprising four teams from the West each (Groups A–C) and two involving four teams from the East each (Groups D–E). Teams were seeded into pots: four pots for West region and East region, and drawn into the relevant positions within each group, based on their association ranking. Teams from the same association could not be drawn into the same group.

The following 20 teams entered the group stage draw, which included the 11 direct entrants, three losers from the AFC Champions League Two qualifying play-offs and the two winners of the preliminary stage.

Region	Groups	Pot 1	Pot 2	Pot 3	Pot 4
West Region	A–C	(Bhutan) Paro^{PS}	(Oman) Al-Seeb^{ACL2}	(Oman) Al-Shabab	(Kuwait) Al-Arabi^{PS}
West Region	A–C	Al-Kuwait	(Tajikistan) Regar-TadAZ Tursunzoda^{ACL2}	(Lebanon) Al-Ansar	(Kyrgyzstan) Abdysh-Ata Kant^{PS}
West Region	A–C	(Kyrgyzstan) Muras United^{PS}	(Turkmenistan) Altyn Asyr	(Lebanon) Safa	(Bangladesh) Bashundhara Kings^{PS}
East Region	D–E	(Indonesia) Dewa United Banten	(Philippines) Manila Digger^{ACL2}	(Chinese Taipei) Tainan City^{PS}	(Cambodia) Phnom Penh Crown^{PS}
East Region	D–E	(Cambodia) PKR Svay Rieng	(Myanmar) Shan United	(Mongolia) SP Falcons^{PS}	(Laos) Ezra^{PS}

Legend

- ACL2: AFC Champions League Two qualifying play-off losers
- PS: Preliminary stage winners

== Format ==
In the group stage, each group will be played in a single round-robin format on a centralised venue. Eight teams will progress to the quarter-finals of the knockout stage : the three group winners and best-ranked runners-up from the West, and the group winners and runner-ups of each group from the East.

=== Tiebreakers ===
The teams were ranked according to points (3 points for a win, 1 point for a draw, 0 points for a loss). If tied on points, tiebreakers were applied in the following order (Regulations Article 8.3):

1. Points in head-to-head matches among tied teams;
2. Goal difference in head-to-head matches among tied teams;
3. Goals scored in head-to-head matches among tied teams;
4. If more than two teams were tied, and after applying all head-to-head criteria above, a subset of teams were still tied, all head-to-head criteria above were reapplied exclusively to this subset of teams;
5. Goal difference in all group matches;
6. Goals scored in all group matches;
7. Penalty shoot-out if only two teams playing each other in the last round of the group are tied;
8. Disciplinary points (yellow card = 1 point, red card as a result of two yellow cards = 3 points, direct red card = 3 points, yellow card followed by direct red card = 4 points);
9. Drawing of lots.

== Schedule ==
The schedule of the group stage is as follows.

Round	Dates (West region)	Dates (East region)
Matchday 1	25 October 2025	26 October 2025
Matchday 2	28 October 2025	29 October 2025
Matchday 3	31 October 2025	1 November 2025

== Groups ==
The detailed schedule was announced on 28 August 2025 after the draw ceremony.

=== West Region ===
==== Group A ====
Pos	Team	Pld	W	D	L	GF	GA	GD	Pts	Qualification	ALS	ATA	AAK	PAR
1	(Oman) Al-Shabab	3	3	0	0	6	2	+4	9	Advance to Quarter-finals		3–1	2–1	1–0
2	(Turkmenistan) Altyn Asyr	3	2	0	1	5	4	+1	6				1–0	3–1
3	(Kyrgyzstan) Abdysh-Ata Kant	3	0	1	2	4	6	−2	1					3–3
4	(Bhutan) Paro (H)	3	0	1	2	4	7	−3	1					

Source: AFC
Rules for classification: Tiebreakers
(H) Hosts
25 October 2025
15:00 UTC+6

Altyn Asyr (Turkmenistan)	1–0	(Kyrgyzstan) Abdysh-Ata
Annayew 58'	Report

Changlimithang Stadium, Thimphu
Attendance: 432
Referee: Firdavs Norsafarov (Uzbekistan)
25 October 2025
18:00 UTC+6

Al-Shabab (Oman)	1–0	(Bhutan) Paro
Markneh 26' (pen.)	Report

Changlimithang Stadium, Thimphu
Attendance: 4,933
Referee: Yudi Nurcahya (Indonesia)

28 October 2025
15:00 UTC+6

Abdysh-Ata (Kyrgyzstan)	1–2	(Oman) Al-Shabab
Bilyi 9'	Report	Al-Saadi 44'; Al-Ghafri 77'

Changlimithang Stadium, Thimphu
Attendance: 125
Referee: Saud Al Samhan (Kuwait)
28 October 2025
18:00 UTC+6

Paro (Bhutan)	1–3	(Turkmenistan) Altyn Asyr
Ichimura 15'	Report	Myratberdiyew 9', 37'; Rovshenmyradov 73'

Changlimithang Stadium, Thimphu
Attendance: 2,038
Referee: Tam Ping Wun (Hong Kong)

31 October 2025
15:00 UTC+6

Altyn Asyr (Turkmenistan)	1–3	(Oman) Al-Shabab
Babajanow 29'	Report	Markneh 45'; Al-Rushadi 53', 90+2'

Changlimithang Stadium, Thimphu
Attendance: 93
Referee: Firdavs Norsafarov (Uzbekistan)
31 October 2025
18:00 UTC+6

Paro (Bhutan)	3–3	(Kyrgyzstan) Abdysh-Ata
Asante 33'; Ichimura 45', 90+5'	Report	Bilyi 5'; Taalaybek 17'; Abduzhaparov 84'

Changlimithang Stadium, Thimphu
Attendance: 395
Referee: Feras Taweel (Syria)

==== Group B ====
Pos	Team	Pld	W	D	L	GF	GA	GD	Pts	Qualification	ALK	ALA	ASB	BSK
1	Al-Kuwait (H)	3	2	1	0	6	3	+3	7	Advance to Quarter-finals		3–2	1–1	2–0
2	(Lebanon) Al-Ansar	3	2	0	1	7	4	+3	6	Advance to Quarter-finals			2–1	3–0
3	(Oman) Al-Seeb	3	1	1	1	5	5	0	4					3–2
4	(Bangladesh) Bashundhara Kings	3	0	0	3	2	8	−6	0					

Source: AFC
Rules for classification: Tiebreakers
(H) Hosts
25 October 2025
16:00 UTC+3

Al-Seeb (Oman)	3–2	(Bangladesh) Bashundhara
Al-Rawahi 7'; Al-Aghbari 60'; Al-Muqbali 77'	Report	Augusto 41'; Rakib 53'

Jaber Al-Mubarak Al-Hamad Stadium, Sulaibikhat
Attendance: 2,840
Referee: Wong Wai Lun (Hong Kong)
25 October 2025
19:00 UTC+3

Al-Ansar (Lebanon)	2–3	Al-Kuwait
Khalfallah 7'; Hebous 63' (pen.)	Report	Al-Dhefiri 21'; Daham 52'; Nasser 53'

Jaber Al-Mubarak Al-Hamad Stadium, Sulaibikhat
Attendance: 1,326
Referee: Yousif Saeed Hasan (Iraq)

28 October 2025
16:00 UTC+3

Bashundhara (Bangladesh)	0–3	(Lebanon) Al-Ansar
	Report	Akuki 43'; Khalfallah 76' (pen.); Hebous 90+3'

Jaber Al-Mubarak Al-Hamad Stadium, Sulaibikhat
Attendance: 314
Referee: Khash-Erdene Bold (Mongolia)
28 October 2025
19:00 UTC+3

Al-Kuwait	1–1	(Oman) Al-Seeb
Amoory 43'	Report	Al-Muqbali 34'

Jaber Al-Mubarak Al-Hamad Stadium, Sulaibikhat
Attendance: 637
Referee: Abdullo Davlatov (Tajikistan)

31 October 2025
16:00 UTC+3

Al-Seeb (Oman)	1–2	(Lebanon) Al-Ansar
Al-Muqbali 16'	Report	Hebous 66'; Konney 71'

Jaber Al-Mubarak Al-Hamad Stadium, Sulaibikhat
Attendance: 347
Referee: Yousif Saeed Hasan (Iraq)
31 October 2025
19:00 UTC+3

Al-Kuwait	2–0	(Bangladesh) Bashundhara
Nasser 1'; Khenissi 45+3'	Report

Jaber Al-Mubarak Al-Hamad Stadium, Sulaibikhat
Attendance: 1,971
Referee: Zayniddin Alimov (Kyrgyzstan)

==== Group C ====
Pos	Team	Pld	W	D	L	GF	GA	GD	Pts	Qualification	MRU	AAR	SSC	RTT
1	(Kyrgyzstan) Muras United (H)	3	1	2	0	3	1	+2	5	Advance to Quarter-finals		1–1	2–0	0–0
2	(Kuwait) Al-Arabi	3	1	2	0	5	4	+1	5				2–2	2–1
3	(Lebanon) Safa	3	1	1	1	4	5	−1	4					2–1
4	(Tajikistan) Regar-TadAZ Tursunzoda	3	0	1	2	2	4	−2	1					

Source: AFC
Rules for classification: Tiebreakers
(H) Hosts
25 October 2025
16:00 UTC+6

Safa (Lebanon)	2–2	(Kuwait) Al-Arabi
Camara 42'; Mehanna 45'	Report	Iwuala 53' (pen.); Hayek 68' (o.g.)

Dolen Omurzakov Stadium, Bishkek
Attendance: 315
Referee: Morteza Mansourian (Iran)
25 October 2025
20:00 UTC+6

Regar-TadAZ (Tajikistan)	0–0	(Kyrgyzstan) Muras United
	Report

Dolen Omurzakov Stadium, Bishkek
Attendance: 7,442
Referee: Baraa Aisha (Palestine)

28 October 2025
16:00 UTC+6

Al-Arabi (Kuwait)	2–1	(Tajikistan) Regar-TadAZ
Nasari 39'; Majed 70'	Report	Mabatshoev 33'

Dolen Omurzakov Stadium, Bishkek
Attendance: 244
Referee: Axrol Riskullayev (Uzbekistan)
28 October 2025
20:00 UTC+6

Muras United (Kyrgyzstan)	2–0	(Lebanon) Safa
Yunusov 17'; Toktonaliev 90+6'	Report

Dolen Omurzakov Stadium, Bishkek
Attendance: 9,075
Referee: Ammar Abo Alo (Syria)

31 October 2025
16:00 UTC+6

Regar-TadAZ (Tajikistan)	1–2	(Lebanon) Safa
Panzhiev 9'	Report	Shweikh 40'; Camara 50'

Dolen Omurzakov Stadium, Bishkek
Attendance: 205
Referee: Morteza Mansourian (Iran)
31 October 2025
20:00 UTC+6

Al-Arabi (Kuwait)	1–1	(Kyrgyzstan) Muras United
Iwuala 21'	Report	Gomez 55'

Dolen Omurzakov Stadium, Bishkek
Attendance: 12,757
Referee: Ahmed Kadhim Gatea (Iraq)

==== Ranking of runners-up teams ====
Pos	Grp	Team	Pld	W	D	L	GF	GA	GD	Pts	Qualification
1	B	(Lebanon) Al-Ansar	3	2	0	1	7	4	+3	6	Advance to Quarter-finals
2	A	(Turkmenistan) Altyn Asyr	3	2	0	1	5	4	+1	6	
3	C	(Kuwait) Al-Arabi	3	1	2	0	5	4	+1	5	

Source: AFC
Rules for classification: 1) points; 2) goal difference; 3) number of goals scored; 4) fair play ranking; 5) drawing of lots

=== East Region ===
==== Group D ====
Pos	Team	Pld	W	D	L	GF	GA	GD	Pts	Qualification	SVR	MDF	SPF	EZR
1	(Cambodia) PKR Svay Rieng (H)	3	2	1	0	8	2	+6	7	Advance to Quarter-finals		2–2	3–0	3–0
2	(Philippines) Manila Digger	3	2	1	0	7	3	+4	7	Advance to Quarter-finals			2–0	3–1
3	(Mongolia) SP Falcons	3	1	0	2	3	6	−3	3					3–1
4	(Laos) Ezra	3	0	0	3	2	9	−7	0					

Source: AFC
Rules for classification: Tiebreakers
(H) Hosts
26 October 2025
16:00 UTC+7

PKR Svay Rieng (Cambodia)	3–0	(Mongolia) SP Falcons
Peprah 17', 32'; Odawara 90+1'	Report

Morodok Techo National Stadium, Phnom Penh
Attendance: 10,369
Referee: Sanzhar Zhakypbekov (Kyrgyzstan)
26 October 2025
19:00 UTC+7

Manila Digger (Philippines)	3–1	(Laos) Ezra
Gai 14'; Tafem 21'; Touray 56'	Report	Phanthavong 29'

Morodok Techo National Stadium, Phnom Penh
Attendance: 777
Referee: Ali Reda (Lebanon)

29 October 2025
16:00 UTC+7

SP Falcons (Mongolia)	0–2	(Philippines) Manila Digger
	Report	Ceesay 39'; Gai 61'

Morodok Techo National Stadium, Phnom Penh
Attendance: 461
Referee: Virendha Rai (Bhutan)
29 October 2025
19:00 UTC+7

Ezra (Laos)	0–3	(Cambodia) PKR Svay Rieng
	Report	Patrick 20'; Odawara 45+2'; Ogawa 50'

Morodok Techo National Stadium, Phnom Penh
Attendance: 5,606
Referee: Chen Hsin-chuan (Chinese Taipei)

1 November 2025
16:00 UTC+7

SP Falcons (Mongolia)	3–1	(Laos) Ezra
Ayvazov 11'; Ferreira 43' (pen.); Baatartsogt 53'	Report	Chony 19'

Morodok Techo National Stadium, Phnom Penh
Attendance: 225
Referee: Lakmal Weerakkody (Sri Lanka)
1 November 2025
19:00 UTC+7

Manila Digger (Philippines)	2–2	(Cambodia) PKR Svay Rieng
Gai 39', 62'	Report	Peprah 47'; Sosidan 85'

Morodok Techo National Stadium, Phnom Penh
Attendance: 5,310
Referee: Ali Reda (Lebanon)

==== Group E ====
Pos	Team	Pld	W	D	L	GF	GA	GD	Pts	Qualification	DUB	PPC	TNC	SNU
1	(Indonesia) Dewa United Banten (H)	3	2	1	0	9	2	+7	7	Advance to Quarter-finals		1–1	4–0	4–1
2	(Cambodia) Phnom Penh Crown	3	2	1	0	7	4	+3	7	Advance to Quarter-finals			3–2	3–1
3	(Chinese Taipei) Tainan City	3	1	0	2	4	8	−4	3					2–1
4	(Myanmar) Shan United	3	0	0	3	3	9	−6	0					

Source: AFC
Rules for classification: Tiebreakers
(H) Hosts
26 October 2025
15:00 UTC+7

Shan United (Myanmar)	1–2	(Chinese Taipei) Tainan City
Ye Min Thu 69'	Report	Sakkouh 39'; Gory 43'

Sports Centre Kelapa Dua, Tangerang
Attendance: 50
Referee: Ammar Ashkanani (Kuwait)
26 October 2025
19:00 UTC+7

Dewa United (Indonesia)	1–1	(Cambodia) Phnom Penh Crown
Egy 70'	Report	Dyer 75'

Sports Centre Kelapa Dua, Tangerang
Attendance: 871
Referee: Clarence Leow (Singapore)

29 October 2025
15:00 UTC+7

Phnom Penh Crown (Cambodia)	3–1	(Myanmar) Shan United
Dyer 48', 88'; Tellez 80'	Report	Myat Kaung Khant 11'

Sports Centre Kelapa Dua, Tangerang
Attendance: 30
Referee: Sajëçon Zajniddinov (Tajikistan)
29 October 2025
19:00 UTC+7

Tainan City (Chinese Taipei)	0–4	(Indonesia) Dewa United
	Report	Messidoro 7', 28'; Egy 38'; Mbarga 57'

Sports Centre Kelapa Dua, Tangerang
Attendance: 447
Referee: Ali Al Ashkar (Lebanon)

1 November 2025
15:00 UTC+7

Tainan City (Chinese Taipei)	2–3	(Cambodia) Phnom Penh Crown
Aranda 13'; Estama 66'	Report	Dyer 27', 46'; Devit 57'

Sports Centre Kelapa Dua, Tangerang
Attendance: 97
Referee: Lê Thị Ly (Vietnam)
1 November 2025
19:00 UTC+7

Dewa United (Indonesia)	4–1	(Myanmar) Shan United
Egy 10'; Jajá 20'; Messidoro 58' (pen.); Struick 61'	Report	M. Souza 42'

Sports Centre Kelapa Dua, Tangerang
Attendance: 676
Referee: Ali Al Ashkar (Lebanon)

== See also ==
- 2025–26 AFC Champions League Elite league stage
- 2025–26 AFC Champions League Two group stage
