= Ousman Gai =

Gambian footballer (born 2000)

Personal information
- Full name: Pa Ousman Gai
- Date of birth: 6 March 2000 (age 26)
- Place of birth: Gambia
- Height: 1.83 m (6 ft 0 in)
- Position: Midfielder

Team information
- Current team: Visakha
- Number: 15

Senior career*
| Years | Team | Apps | (Gls) |
- Stade de Mbour
| 2021–2022 | Teungueth | | |
| 2022–2024 | Banjul United | | |
| 2024–2026 | Manila Digger | 36 | (41) |
| 2026– | Visakha | 7 | (3) |
- * Club domestic league appearances and goals as of 9 November 2026

Pa Ousman Gai (born 6 March 2000) is a Gambian professional footballer who plays as a midfielder for Visakha.

== Club career ==
=== Early club career ===
Gai started his career at Stade de Mbour in Senegal. Gai would then move to Teungueth in 2021. After a brief stint at the club, Gai would return to Gambia and earned a move to Banjul United in 2024.

=== Manila Digger ===
==== 2024–25 season ====
Gai signed for Filipino club Manila Digger in 2024 alongside Gambian compatriots Modou Manneh, Modou Joof, and Saikou Ceesay. Gai made his debut in the Philippines Football League against One Taguig playing as a starter in a 3–1 loss. His big break arrived in his second match in the league against Mendiola 1991 where he would score a brace in a 4–0 win.

In his match against Dynamic Herb Cebu on 22 February 2025, he would be sent off in the match after receiving two yellow cards and would get suspended for three matches.

In the 2024–25 PFL Finals Series Gai would score an own goal against One Taguig in the semi-finals, but would redeem himself, as he scored the game-winning goal enough for Manila Digger to advance to the final of the Finals Series.

==== 2025–26 season ====
Gai stayed at the club for another season and would be part of Digger's starting squad in their match against Persib in the 2025–26 AFC Champions League Two Qualification Play-offs.

Gai made his continental debut on 13 August 2025 in the AFC Champions League Two against Persib in a 2–1 loss.

In the 2025–26 AFC Challenge League, Gai became one of the important players for Manila Digger in their campaign scoring against teams: Ezra from Laos and SP Falcons from Mongolia, he would also get an assist in the match, assisting fellow Gambian compatriot Saikou Ceesay in the first half of the match.

== International career ==
While playing for Stade de Mbour, Gai was part of the Gambia U20 squad in the WAFU U-20 Championship in 2018. Gai was also part of the squad that won against hosts Liberia in the final to secure their first international title.

== Career statistics ==
=== Club ===
As of 30 May 2026

| Club | Season | League | | | National cup | | Continental (Note: combined stats from AFC Champions League Two and AFC Challenge League.) | |
| Club | Season | Division | Apps | Goals | Apps | Goals | Apps | Goals |
|---|---|---|---|---|---|---|---|---|
| Manila Digger | 2024–25 | Philippines Football League | 14 | 9 | – | | | |
| Manila Digger | 2025–26 | Philippines Football League | 22 | 32 | – | | 7 | 6 |

== Honours ==
Gambia U20

- WAFU U-20 Championship: 2018

Manila Digger

- Philippines Football League: 2025–26

Individual

- Philippines Football League: 2025–26 top scorer
