= 2025–26 AFC Challenge League knockout stage =

The 2025–26 AFC Challenge League knockout stage began on 5 March with the quarter-finals, and ended on 13 May 2026 with the final being hosted by the West region finalist. A total of eight teams competed in the knockout stage to decide the champions of the 2025–26 AFC Challenge League.

== Qualified teams ==
The following teams advanced from the group stage:

- The winners of the groups and the best runner-up in the West Region (Groups A–C).
- The winners and runner-ups of each group in the East Region (Groups D–E).

Region	Group	Winners	Runners-up
West Region	A	(Oman) Al-Shabab	—N/a
West Region	B	Al-Kuwait	(Lebanon) Al-Ansar
West Region	C	(Kyrgyzstan) Muras United	—N/a
East Region	D	(Cambodia) PKR Svay Rieng	(Philippines) Manila Digger
East Region	E	(Indonesia) Dewa United Banten	(Cambodia) Phnom Penh Crown

== Format ==
In the knockout stage, the eight teams will play a single-elimination tournament. Each tie will be played on a home-and-away two-legged basis, except the final which is played as a single match. Extra time and penalty shoot-out will be used to decide the winners if necessary. (Regulations Article 10).

Round	Matchups
Quarter-finals	West Region (Matchups and order of legs determined by identity of best runners-up: first team listed host first leg, second team listed host second leg): If best runners-up from Group A; QF1: Group A runners-up vs. Group B winners; QF2: Group C winners vs. Group A winners; If best runners-up from Group B; QF1: Group B runners-up vs. Group C winners; QF2: Group A winners vs. Group B winners; If best runners-up from Group C; QF1: Group C runners-up vs. Group A winners; QF2: Group B winners vs. Group C winners; East Region (First team listed host first leg, second team listed host second leg): QF3: Group E runners-up vs. Group D winners; QF4: Group D runners-up vs. Group E winners
Semi-finals	(First team listed host first leg, second team listed host second leg) West Region: SF1: Winners of QF1 vs. Winners of QF2; East Region: SF2: Winners of QF3 vs. Winners of QF4
Final	(Winners of West Region semi-finals host match): Winners of SF1 vs. Winners of SF2

== Schedule ==
The quarter-finals for the West region was postponed due to the impacts from the 2026 Iran war. On March 24, AFC announced that all West Region quarter-finals and semi-finals matches would be changed to single-leg ties at a centralized venue.

The schedule of each round is as follows.

Stage	Round	East Region	West Region
Knockout stage	Quarter-finals	5 March 2026 (First leg); 12 March 2026 (Second leg)	19 April 2026
Knockout stage	Semi-finals	9 April 2026 (First leg); 16 April 2026 (Second leg)	22 April 2026
Knockout stage	Final	13 May 2026	

== Bracket ==
Quarter-finals
(Lebanon) Al-Ansar	0
(Kyrgyzstan) Muras United	3
West Region
(Oman) Al-Shabab	3
Al-Kuwait	5
(Cambodia) Phnom Penh Crown	1	1	2
(Cambodia) PKR Svay Rieng	4	2	6
East Region
(Philippines) Manila Digger	1	2	3
(Indonesia) Dewa United Banten	0	2	2

Semi-finals
(Kyrgyzstan) Muras United	1
Al-Kuwait	2
(Cambodia) PKR Svay Rieng	1	3	4
(Philippines) Manila Digger	1	0	1

Final
Al-Kuwait (a.e.t.)	4
(Cambodia) PKR Svay Rieng	3

== Quarter-finals ==
=== Summary ===
The West regions quarter-finals fixtures were postponed indefinitely by the AFC due to the impacts from the 2026 Iran war. The first legs for the East Region were scheduled to be played on 5 March, with the second legs on 12 March. Later, the fixtures in the West Region were shortened to a single leg to be played on 19 April.

Team 1	Score	Team 2
West Region
Al Ansar (Lebanon)	0–3	(Kyrgyzstan) Muras United
Al-Shabab (Oman)	3–5	Al-Kuwait

Team 1	Agg.	Team 2	1st leg	2nd leg
East Region
Phnom Penh Crown (Cambodia)	2–6	(Cambodia) PKR Svay Rieng	1–4	1–2
Manila Digger (Philippines)	3–2	(Indonesia) Dewa United Banten	1–0	2–2

=== West Region ===
19 April 2026
15:00 UTC+6

Al-Shabab (Oman)	3–5	Al-Kuwait
Al-Ghafri 72'; Markneh 75', 88'	Report	Lwaliwa 34' (o.g.); Khenissi 39'; Amoory 48'; Marhoon 63'; Zayid 90'

Dolen Omurzakov Stadium, Bishkek (Note: Due to the impacts from the 2026 Iran war, the AFC decided to play a one-legged tie at a neutral venue.)
Attendance: 214
Referee: Ahmad A'Qashah (Singapore)

19 April 2026
20:00 UTC+6

Al Ansar (Lebanon)	0–3	(Kyrgyzstan) Muras United
	Report	Yaskovich 41'; Shukurov 45'; Batsula 74'

Dolen Omurzakov Stadium, Bishkek
Attendance: 5,552
Referee: Hiroki Kasahara (Japan)

=== East Region ===
5 March 2026
19:00 UTC+7

Phnom Penh Crown (Cambodia)	1–4	(Cambodia) PKR Svay Rieng
Dyer 3'	Report	Peprah 29', 67', 82'; Patrick 75' (pen.)

Olympic Stadium, Phnom Penh
Attendance: 20,249
Referee: Venkatesh Ramachandran (India)
12 March 2026
19:00 UTC+7

PKR Svay Rieng (Cambodia)	2–1	(Cambodia) Phnom Penh Crown
Odawara 51', 60'	Report	Dyer 45+3'

Morodok Techo National Stadium, Phnom Penh
Attendance: 12,173
Referee: Tuan Yaasin (Malaysia)

Preah Khan Reach Svay Rieng won 6–2 on aggregate.

5 March 2026
20:30 UTC+8

Manila Digger (Philippines)	1–0	(Indonesia) Dewa United Banten
Nishioka 21'	Report

Rizal Memorial Stadium, Manila
Attendance: 1,471
Referee: Du Jianxin (China)
12 March 2026
20:30 UTC+7

Dewa United Banten (Indonesia)	2–2	(Philippines) Manila Digger
Lowe 66', 81'	Report	Gai 35'; Joof 52'

Sports Centre Kelapa Dua, Tangerang
Attendance: 1,231
Referee: Daniel Elder (Australia)

Manila Digger won 3–2 on aggregate.

== Semi-finals ==
=== Summary ===
The first legs for the East Region were played on 9 April, with the second legs on 16 April 2026. The single-legged fixture for the West Region was played on 22 April.

Team 1	Score	Team 2
West Region
Muras United (Kyrgyzstan)	1–2	Al-Kuwait

Team 1	Agg.	Team 2	1st leg	2nd leg
East Region
PKR Svay Rieng (Cambodia)	4–1	(Philippines) Manila Digger	1–1	3–0

=== West Region ===
22 April 2026
20:00 UTC+6

Muras United (Kyrgyzstan)	1–2	Al-Kuwait
Zhaparov 36'	Report	Marhoon 45+3'; Barrahma 47'

Dolen Omurzakov Stadium, Bishkek
Attendance: 12,453
Referee: Shen Yinhao (China)

=== East Region ===
9 April 2026
19:00 UTC+7

PKR Svay Rieng (Cambodia)	1–1	(Philippines) Manila Digger
T. Alves 4'	Report	Gai 85'

Morodok Techo National Stadium, Phnom Penh
Attendance: 16,602
Referee: Chae Sang-hyeop (South Korea)
16 April 2026
20:00 UTC+8

Manila Digger (Philippines)	0–3	(Cambodia) PKR Svay Rieng
	Report	Krya 11'; Peprah 39', 68'

Rizal Memorial Stadium, Manila
Attendance: 2,065
Referee: Sadullo Gulmurodi (Tajikistan)

Preah Khan Reach Svay Rieng won 4–1 on aggregate.

== Final ==
The final took place on 13 May 2026, with the team from the West Region hosting the final. The winners also qualified for the 2026–27 AFC Champions League Two group stage, unless they have already qualified for the Champions League Two through their league performance.

13 May 2026
19:45 UTC+3

Al-Kuwait	4–3 (a.e.t.)	(Cambodia) PKR Svay Rieng
Barrahma 48'; Marhoon 56'; Amoory 99'; Nasser 110'	Report	T. Alves 3'; Fujii 9'; Roque 96'

Jaber Al-Ahmad International Stadium, Ardiya
Attendance: 43,366
Referee: Qasim Al-Hatmi (Oman)
