= 2026 AFC Challenge League final =

Football match

- Jaber Al-Ahmad International Stadium in Kuwait City hosted the final
- Event: AFC Challenge League
Al-Kuwait	PKR Svay Rieng
(Kuwait)	(Cambodia)
4	3
- After extra time
- Date: 13 May 2026
- Venue: Jaber Al-Ahmad International Stadium, Ardiya, Kuwait
- Referee: Qasim Al-Hatmi (Oman)
- Attendance: 43,366
- Weather: Light thunderstorms 36 °C (97 °F)

The 2026 AFC Challenge League final was the final match of the 2025–26 AFC Challenge League, the 12th season of Asia's tertiary club football tournament organised by the Asian Football Confederation. It was played on 13 May 2026 in Ardiya, Kuwait, between local club Al-Kuwait and Cambodian side PKR Svay Rieng.

The winners were given an indirect preliminary stage slot for the 2026–27 AFC Champions League Two, if they had not already qualified through their domestic performance.

== Teams ==
Team	Region (Federation)	Previous finals appearances (bold indicates winners)
Al-Kuwait	West (WAFF)	None
(Cambodia) PKR Svay Rieng	East (AFF)	1 (2025)

== Venue ==
The final venue was pre-determined on a rotation basis, with the match hosted by the Al-Kuwait in Ardiya, Kuwait.

== Route to the final ==
Al-Kuwait		Round	(Cambodia) PKR Svay Rieng			
Opponent	Result	Group stage	Opponent	Result		
(Lebanon) Al-Ansar	3–2	Matchday 1	(Mongolia) SP Falcons	3–0		
(Oman) Al-Seeb	1–1	Matchday 2	(Laos) Ezra	3–0		
(Bangladesh) Bashundhara Kings	3–0	Matchday 3	(Philippines) Manila Digger	2–2		
**Group B winners**: Pos / Team / Pld / Pts; **1** / Al-Kuwait (H) / **3** / **7**; 2 / (Lebanon) Al-Ansar / 3 / **6**; 3 / (Oman) Al-Seeb / 3 / **4**; 4 / (Bangladesh) Bashundhara Kings / 3 / **0**; Source: AFC (H) Hosts		Final standings	**Group D winners**: Pos / Team / Pld / Pts; **1** / (Cambodia) PKR Svay Rieng (H) / **3** / **7**; 2 / (Philippines) Manila Digger / 3 / **7**; 3 / (Mongolia) SP Falcons / 3 / **3**; 4 / (Laos) Ezra / 3 / **0**; Source: AFC (H) Hosts			
Opponent	Result	Knockout stage	Opponent	Agg.	1st leg	2nd leg
(Oman) Al-Shabab	5–3 (N)	Quarter-finals	(Cambodia) Phnom Penh Crown	6–2	4–1 (A)	2–1 (H)
(Kyrgyzstan) Muras United	2–1 (A)	Semi-finals	(Philippines) Manila Digger	4–1	1–1 (H)	3–0 (A)

== Match details ==
13 May 2026
19:45 UTC+3

Al-Kuwait	4–3 (a.e.t.)	(Cambodia) PKR Svay Rieng
Barrahma 48'; Marhoon 56'; Amoory 99'; Nasser 110'	Report	T. Alves 3'; Fujii 9'; Roque 96'

Jaber Al-Ahmad International Stadium, Ardiya
Attendance: 43,366
Referee: Qasim Al-Hatmi (Oman)

**Al-Kuwait**	**PKRSR**

GK	27	(Kuwait) Khaled Al-Rashidi
RB	23	(Kuwait) Mohammad Frieh		(substituted off) 46'
CB	66	(Morocco) El Mehdi Barrahma
CB	35	(Democratic Republic of the Congo) Arsène Zola
LB	21	(Iran) Ali Pourdara (c)
CM	8	(Kuwait) Ahmed Al-Dhefiri		(substituted off) 105'
CM	4	(Kuwait) Redha Abujabarah		(substituted off) 97'
RW	11	(Kuwait) Mohammad Daham
AM	26	(Bahrain) Mohamed Marhoon		(substituted off) 113'
LW	10	(Egypt) Amr Abdelfattah		(substituted off) 120+2'
CF	27	(Tunisia) Taha Yassine Khenissi		(substituted off) 90'
Substitutes:
GK	33	(Kuwait) Saud Al Hoshan
DF	2	(Kuwait) Sami Al-Sanea	(yellow card) 120+1'	(substituted on) 97'
DF	5	(Kuwait) Fahed Al Hajri
DF	6	(Kuwait) Yousif Al-Khebizi
DF	12	(Kuwait) Mohsen Falah
DF	13	(Kuwait) Fahad Hamoud
MF	9	(Kuwait) Faisal Zayid	(yellow card) 120'	(substituted on) 105'
MF	22	(Ivory Coast) Idrissa Doumbia		(substituted on) 46'
MF	29	(Kuwait) Ahmad Zanki		(substituted on) 120+2'
MF	72	(Kuwait) Humoud Al-Sanousi
FW	7	(Kuwait) Ebrahim Kameel		(substituted on) 114'
FW	20	(Kuwait) Yousef Nasser		(substituted on) 90'
Manager:
(Montenegro) Nebojša Jovović

GK	7	(Cambodia) Vireak Dara
RB	13	(Cambodia) Sareth Krya	(yellow card) 47'
CB	4	(Morocco) Faris Hammouti
CB	5	(Cambodia) Soeuy Visal (c)
LB	61	(Japan) Takashi Odawara		(substituted off) 105'
DM	28	(Japan) Ryo Fujii
RM	97	(Scotland) Connor Shields		(substituted off) 67'
CM	21	(Brazil) Cristian Roque	(yellow card) 90+7'	(substituted off) 98'
CM	77	(Portugal) Tiago Alves		(substituted off) 83'
LM	98	(Brazil) Patrick	(yellow card) 80'
CF	46	(Ghana) Kwame Peprah
Substitutes:
GK	18	(Cambodia) Aim Sovannarath
DF	19	(Cambodia) Seut Baraing
DF	35	(Cambodia) Sophal Dimong
MF	8	(Cambodia) Yudai Ogawa	(yellow card) 116'	(substituted on) 105'
MF	11	(Cambodia) Min Ratanak		(substituted on) 83'
MF	16	(Cambodia) Kim Sokyuth		(substituted on) 67'	(substituted off) 113'
FW	9	(Cambodia) Sieng Chanthea		(substituted on) 113'
FW	14	(Cambodia) Sovan Dauna
FW	22	(Cambodia) Chantha Chanteaka
FW	30	(Cambodia) Nhean Sosidan		(substituted on) 98'
FW	45	(Cambodia) Narong Kakada
Manager:
(Northern Ireland) Mattew McConkey

== See also ==
- 2026 AFC Champions League Elite final
- 2026 AFC Champions League Two final
- 2026 AFC Women's Champions League final
