= Christian Schaffner =

American soccer player (born 2000)

Personal information
- Full name: Christian John Eizmendi Schaffner
- Date of birth: September 25, 2000 (age 26)
- Place of birth: Palo Alto, California, United States
- Height: 1.70 m (5 ft 7 in)
- Position: Defender

Team information
- Current team: One Taguig

Youth career
- Junipero Serra High School
- 2016–2017: CF Hernán Cortés
- 2017–2018: Alpine Strikers
- 2018–2019: CF Hernán Cortés

College career
Years	Team	Apps	(Gls)
2019–2021	Ithaca College	4	(1)
2021–2022	Academy of Art University	33	(2)

Senior career*
Years	Team	Apps	(Gls)
2021–2022	Bay Cities		
2022–2023	San Francisco Glens		
2023	Maharlika Manila	7	(0)
2023–2025	Stallion Laguna	39	(1)
2025–2026	Manila Digger	6	(1)
2026–	One Taguig		
- * Club domestic league appearances and goals as of 15:24, September 18, 2023 (UTC)

Christian John Eizmendi Schaffner (born September 25, 2000) is a professional soccer player who plays a defender for Philippines Football League team One Taguig. Born in the United States, he is eligible to represent the Philippines internationally.

== Youth career ==
Schaffner was born in Palo Alto, California, and played soccer for Junipero Serra High School. In 2016, he temporarily moved to Zaragoza, Spain to learn the language and culture and played for the youth team of CF Hernán Cortés, returning for another year in 2018.

== Club career ==
=== College career ===
After spending time in Spain, Schaffner first played college soccer at Ithaca College in 2019, playing four matches in only one season due to the COVID-19 pandemic. In 2021, he transferred to Academy of Art University, playing two years and making 33 appearances before graduating.

=== Early club career ===
While playing soccer at both Ithaca and Academy of Art, he played club soccer for Bay Cities, who were at the time participating in the National Independent Soccer Association. After graduating, he played for the San Francisco Glens.

=== Philippines Football League ===
In 2023, the Philippines Football League clubs held a combine in the San Francisco Bay Area to scout for trialists for their clubs. Schaffner made it to the first team of Maharlika Manila. He made his debut in the second half of the season, captaining the team in a 1–0 win over Mendiola, the team's first of the season. After the season's conclusion, he signed for Stallion Laguna as a reinforcement for the club's campaign in the 2023–24 AFC Cup, scoring in the 2023 Copa Paulino Alcantara.

== Honors ==
Manila Digger

- Philippines Football League: 2025–26
