= Habes Mubarak =

Jordanian footballer (born 2001)

Personal information
- Birth name: Habes Mubarak
- Date of birth: 18 April 2001 (age 25)
- Place of birth: New York City, New York, U.S.
- Height: 1.85 m (6 ft 1 in)
- Position: Midfielder

Team information
- Current team: Al-Salt
- Number: 25

Youth career
- –2019: Jacksonville Armada

Senior career*
Years	Team	Apps	(Gls)
2020–2023	AD Alcorcón C		
2025	Mendiola 1991	5	(0)
2025–	Al-Salt	0	(0)
- * Club domestic league appearances and goals as of 27 July 2025 ‡ National team caps and goals as of 9 January 2025

Habes Mubarak (Arabic: حابس مبارك; born 18 April 2001) is a professional footballer who plays as a midfielder for Jordanian Pro League club Al-Salt. Born in the United States, he represents Jordan at international level.

== Early life ==
Mubarak was born in New York City and raised in Jacksonville, Florida, where he attended Sandalwood High School. He was named in the All-Gateway Conference at Duval County in 2019.

== Club career ==
=== Early career ===
Mubarak was a part of Jacksonville Armada's youth system. He participated in a winter camp at FC St. Pauli's U17 team in 2018.

=== Alcorcón C ===
On 17 January 2020, Mubarak joined AD Alcorcón's U23 team.

=== Mendiola 1991 ===
On 11 December 2024, Mubarak signed with Philippines Football League club Mendiola 1991.

=== Al-Salt ===
On 27 July 2025, Mubarak joined Jordanian Pro League club Al-Salt on a two-year contract.

== International career ==
On 2 January 2025, Mubarak was called up to the Jordan national football team for a training camp held in Amman.
