= Baboucarr Touray =

Gambian footballer (born 2005)

Personal information
- Full name: Baboucarr Touray
- Date of birth: 19 December 2005 (age 20)
- Place of birth: Kartung, The Gambia
- Height: 1.75 m (5 ft 9 in)
- Position: Winger

Team information
- Current team: Manila Digger
- Number: 11

Youth career
- 2018–2020: White Croc Academy
- 2020–2021: Folonko Real Estate

Senior career*
Years	Team	Apps	(Gls)
2021–2022	Gambia Armed Forces		
2022–2025	Real de Banjul	9+	(8+)
2025–	Manila Digger	12	(11)
- * Club domestic league appearances and goals as of 5:57, 4 March 2026 (UTC)

Baboucarr Touray (born 19 December 2005) is a Gambian professional footballer who plays as a winger for Philippines Football League club Manila Digger.

== Club career ==
=== Youth and early club career ===
Touray first played youth football for White Croc Academy in his hometown of Kartung, also playing for various other clubs in the following years including Folonko Real Estate FC. In 2021, he joined GFA League First Division club Armed Forces, helping the club to a ninth-place finish in 2023.

=== Real de Banjul ===
Touray departed the Gambian Armed Forces for league heavyweights Real de Banjul. Though playing for the team at such a young age he established himself as one of the team's important players on the wing, where he won three consecutive titles from 2023 to 2025. He also won the GFF Super Cup in 2024, defeating Medina United.

=== Manila Digger ===
In mid-2025, Touray signed for Manila Digger of the Philippines Football League ahead of the club's campaign in the AFC Challenge League, joining the club alongside Real teammate David Sambou. He played for the club in their playoff loss to Persib Bandung in the AFC Champions League Two.

In his first twelve appearances in the PFL Touray scored 11 goals, including hat tricks against Tuloy and Valenzuela PB–Mendiola. He also scored for Digger in the Challenge League, in a 3–1 win over Ezra FC of Laos.

== International career ==
Following his performances for Real De Banjul, Touray was first called up to the Gambia U23 national team in 2023 at only 17 years old. A year later he was called up once more for the U20 national team, joining a screening exercise with other locally based players.

== Honours ==
Manila Digger

- Philippines Football League: 2025–26
