= Yuga Watanabe =

Japanese footballer (born 1996)

Personal information
- Date of birth: 15 May 1996 (age 30)
- Place of birth: Tokyo, Japan
- Height: 1.70 m (5 ft 7 in)
- Position: Winger

Team information
- Current team: Rasisalai United
- Number: 7

Youth career
- Meiji University

Senior career*
| Years | Team | Apps | (Gls) |
| 2019–2023 | Kamatamare Sanuki | 74 | (0) |
| 2023–2025 | Brunswick City | | |
| 2025 | Khovd | | |
| 2025–2026 | Manila Digger | 12 | (1) |
| 2026– | Rasisalai United | 0 | (0) |
- * Club domestic league appearances and goals as of 2 August 2026

Yuga Watanabe (渡辺 悠雅, Watanabe Yūga; born 15 May 1996) is a Japanese footballer who plays as a winger for Thai League 1 club Rasisalai United.

== Honors ==
Manila Digger

- Philippines Football League: 2025–26
