= Michael Asong =

Filipino footballer (born 1998)

Personal information
- Full name: Michael Cangco Asong
- Date of birth: 3 October 1998 (age 28)
- Position: Goalkeeper

Team information
- Current team: Manila Digger
- Number: 1

College career
Years	Team	Apps	(Gls)
2015–2019	San Beda University		

Senior career*
Years	Team	Apps	(Gls)
2020–2022	Mendiola 1991	7	(0)
2022–2023	Stallion Laguna	7	(0)
2023	Mendiola 1991	7	(0)
2023–2025	Vic West		
2025–	Manila Digger	12	(0)

International career^{‡}
2013	Philippines U17	4	(0)
2015–2016	Philippines U19	11	(0)
2015–2019	Philippines U23	3	(0)
- * Club domestic league appearances and goals as of 04:54, 16 August 2025 (UTC) ‡ National team caps and goals as of 04:54, 16 August 2025 (UTC)

Michael Cangco Asong (born 3 October 1998) is a Filipino professional footballer who plays as a goalkeeper for Philippines Football League club Manila Digger.

== College career ==
From 2015 to 2019, he played as goalkeeper for the Red Lions of San Beda University, winning two NCAA championships within that span. In early 2020, he left San Beda to pursue professional football with San Beda-based club Mendiola 1991.

== Club career ==
In 2020, Asong joined Mendiola 1991 of the Philippines Football League. However, the club's season was abruptly cut short by the COVID-19 pandemic. He would play several matches for the club in the 2021 Copa Paulino Alcantara and the following season of the PFL.

Before the start of the 2022–23 season, he transferred to Stallion Laguna, where he made seven appearances as the first-team keeper and helped the club finish third. He returned to Mendiola to conclude the season. However, later that year, he would move to Canada and play amateur football with Vic West.

He would return to the Philippines two years later, signing with Manila Digger to fill in after the departure of Yuya Kuriyama. The club finished second in both the 2024–25 PFL and the succeeding Finals Series, qualifying for AFC Competitions for the first time. He made a first-team appearance in the 2025–26 AFC Champions League Two qualifying rounds as Manila Digger lost 2–1 to Persib Bandung of Indonesia.

== International career ==
=== Philippines U17 ===
Asong received his first national team call up for the Philippines U17 national team in 2013, making his debut in the 2013 AFF U-16 Youth Championship in a 4–0 loss to Malaysia. He would represent the country again in the qualifiers for the 2014 AFC U-16 Championships later that year.

=== Philippines U19 ===
Two years later, Asong would get a call-up to the under-19 national team, competing in the 2015 AFF U-19 Youth Championship. He made his debut in the opening matchay, a 2–1 win over Brunei. He would later participate in the qualifiers for the 2016 AFC U-19 Championship, and also the 2016 edition of the AFF U-19 Championship.

=== Philippines U23 ===
While playing for the U19 team, Asong was also called up to the under-23 national team in 2015 for the 2016 AFC U-23 Championship qualifiers. He would get further call-ups for the under-23s until 2019, participating in the 2018 AFC U-23 Championship qualifiers, the 2019 AFF U-22 Youth Championship, and the 2019 Merlion Cup. His last stint with the youth team would be at the 2019 Southeast Asian Games in the Philippines.

== Honors ==
Manila Digger

- Philippines Football League: 2025–26
