= Glenn Ramos =

Filipino football coach

Personal information
- Date of birth: 1964 or 1965 (age 61–62)
- Place of birth: Cebu City, Philippines

Managerial career
- Years: Team
- 2009 – 2011: Philippines U16
- 2012: Philippines U22 (assistant)
- 2018: Global Cebu (assistant)
- 2022: Philippines U16 (assistant)
- 2024: Philippines U20 (assistant)
- 2024: Loyola (assistant)
- 2025 –: Cebu

Tomasito "Glenn" Ramos is a Filipino football coach who is the head coach of Philippines Football League club Dynamic Herb Cebu.

== Early life and education ==
Tomasito "Glenn" Ramos was born in 1964 or 1965 in Cebu City. He pursued a course in marine engineering at the University of the Visayas. While living with his wife in Baguio, Ramos attended the Benguet State University to study physical education. He also took extra units at the University of San Jose-Recoletos to become a PE teacher.

== Managerial career ==
=== Early coaching career ===
In 1987, Ramos started his coaching career with the under-16 team of the University of the Philippines Cebu. While residing in Baguio he coached the Philippine Military Academy as well as a men's and women's selection teams of the city. He was also technical director of the Baguio Football Association. He stopped coaching after he and his wife returned to Cebu City.

=== Don Bosco and Cebu ===
Catholic priest Jun Paradiang of Don Bosco Technical College (DBTC) in Cebu convinced Ramos to coach again an offer he accepted. Ramos coached the Cebu under-16 team to a national title leading him to a permanent role with Don Bosco.

Ramos became known for his coaching role with the football teams of DBTC. DBTC boys have represented Central Visayas at the Palarong Pambansa under Ramos' mentorship.

=== Dynamic Herb Cebu ===
Ramos coached Philippines Football League (PFL) club Loyola during the first round of the 2024–25 season.

In January 2025, Ramos was appointed as head coach of another PFL club Dynamic Herb Cebu, succeeding Turkish coach Mustafa Göksu. The team finished among the top four teams in the 2024–25 regular PFL season earning a place in the 2025 Finals Series, a distinct tournament. Cebu won the Finals Series earning a berth as the Philippines' representative in the 2025–26 ASEAN Club Championship.

== Managerial statistics ==
As of match played 4 February 2026

Managerial record by team and tenure
Team	Nat.	From	To	Record								Ref.
Team	Nat.	From	To	G	W	D	L	GF	GA	GD	Win %	Ref.
DH Cebu	(Philippines)	1 January 2025	Present	30	15	4	11	61	36	+25	50.00	
Career Total				30	15	4	11	61	36	+25	50.00	
