= Philippines Football League Finals Series =

- Organiser(s): Philippines Football League
- Founded: 2017; 2025 (as a standalone tournament)
- Teams: 4
- Current champions: Dynamic Herb Cebu
- Most championships: Dynamic Herb Cebu; Ceres–Negros (1 title each)

The Philippines Football League Finals Series is a post-season tournament for clubs in the Philippines Football League (PFL). In the 2017 season, it was held to determine the inaugural league champions. It was not held from the 2018 season to the 2024 season. The Finals Series associated with the 2024–25 season was a separate competition, apart from league play in which the top team in the league table were crowned champions.

This tournament serves as qualification for the Philippines' representatives to the ASEAN Club Championship.

== Qualification ==
At the conclusion of the PFL season, the team at the top of the league table is the league champion. They, and along with the three next highest-placed teams, will qualify for the Finals Series. It consists of a single-leg semi-finals and final. The #1 seed will play the #4 seed, and the #2 seed will play the #3 seed. The winners of the semi-finals will meet in the "Golden Ticket Final".

== Teams ==
Former teams

PFL Finals Series appearances
Club	Appearances
Kaya–Iloilo^{a}	2 (2017, 2025)
Ceres–Negros	1 (2017)
Dynamic Herb Cebu	1 (2025)
Global Cebu	1 (2017)
Loyola^{b}	1 (2017)
Manila Digger	1 (2025)
One Taguig	1 (2025)

- ^Note a - As Kaya–Makati in 2017.
- ^Note b - As Meralco Manila in 2017.

== Results ==
Year	Final			Third-place play-off			No. of teams	
Year	Champion	Score	Runner-up	Third	Score	Fourth	RS	FS
2017	Ceres–Negros	4–1	Global Cebu	Meralco Manila	3–1	Kaya–Makati	8	4
Year	Final			Losing semifinalists			No. of teams	
Year	Champion	Score	Runner-up	Third	Score	Fourth	RS	FS
2025	Dynamic Herb Cebu	1–0	Manila Digger	Kaya–Iloilo and One Taguig			10	4
