= Jordan Jarvis =

Filipino footballer

Personal information
- Full name: Jordan Blair Daydora Jarvis
- Date of birth: 17 April 1998 (age 28)
- Place of birth: Sai Ying Pun, Hong Kong
- Height: 1.80 m (5 ft 11 in)
- Position: Centre back

Team information
- Current team: Manila Digger F.C.
- Number: 17

Youth career
- Pegasus

College career
Years	Team	Apps	(Gls)
2016–2017	Ateneo de Manila University		

Senior career*
Years	Team	Apps	(Gls)
2017–2018	Davao Aguilas		
2018–2019	Global Cebu	10	(3)
2019	Eastern		
2019–2020	Resources Capital	5	(1)
2020	Global Makati		
2020–2023	United City		
2023	Tai Po	9	(0)
2023	Stallion Laguna		
2024–2025	One Taguig		

International career
2015–2016	Philippines U19	6	(1)
2017–2019	Philippines U22	4	(0)
2017–2019	Philippines U23	3	(0)
- * Club domestic league appearances and goals

Jordan Blair Daydora Jarvis (Chinese: 佐敦查維斯; born 17 April 1998) is a professional footballer who plays as a centre back for Philippines Football League club Manila Digger F.C. Born in Hong Kong, he has represented the Philippines at youth level.

== Early life ==
Jarvis was born in Sai Ying Pun, Hong Kong to an English father and a Filipina mother. He studied in YMCA of Hong Kong Christian College for his secondary school life. His father Mark Jarvis was the owner of Philippine Premier League club United Makati.

== Career ==
=== Youth ===
Jarvis is a former youth player of Hong Kong Premier League club Pegasus.

=== Collegiate career ===
Jarvis played for the football team of his college, the Ateneo Blue Eagles.

=== Davao Aguilas ===
After playing one season with Ateneo in the UAAP, Jarvis joined Philippines Football League club Davao Aguilas.

=== Global Cebu ===
In 2018, in the second season of the PFL, he joined Global Cebu. The club was previously owned by Philippines manager Dan Palami, but after 18 years of owning the club, he sold it to Jarvis' father, Mark Jarvis, who promptly signed his son.

=== Eastern ===
In 2019, after playing two seasons as a professional footballer, Jarvis returned to his country of birth, signing for Hong Kong Premier League club Eastern.

=== United City ===
In August 2020, he was signed by United City F.C. for the 2020 PFL season.

=== Tai Po ===
Jarvis returned to the Hong Kong Premier League on 28 January 2023, signing for Tai Po.

== International career ==
Jarvis was born in Sai Ying Pun, Hong Kong to an English father and a Filipina mother which made him eligible to play for England, Philippines and Hong Kong.

=== Philippines youth ===
In 2015, Jarvis played for the Philippines U-19 team at the 2016 AFC U-19 Championship qualifiers.

Jarvis was called up for the Philippines U-23 team in 2017, ahead of the 2018 AFC U-23 Championship qualifiers against Japan, China, and Cambodia.

=== Philippines ===
Jarvis was called up for the Philippines senior team in October 2018 for the Bangabandhu Cup. He did not play a game, so remains uncapped for his country.

== Honors ==
Manila Digger

- Philippines Football League: 2025–26
