= Kartung =

- Location in the Gambia
- Coordinates: 13°6′N 16°46′W
- Country: The Gambia
- Division: West Coast Region
- District: Kombo South

Population (2009)
  - Total: 5,213 (est.)
- Website: Website

Kartung or Kartong is a coastal village in south-western Gambia on the border with Senegal. It is located approximately 60 kilometres from Banjul and 9.5 kilometres from Gunjur. It is located in Kombo South District in the Western Division. As of 2009, it has an estimated population of 5213.

The village stands on the bank of the Hallahin Bolong River and is accessed by canoes.

Kartung is a multi-ethnic and religious village, but the most dominant religion is Islam that gave rise to the sacred place Folonko.

== Climate ==
Kartong has a tropical savanna climate (Aw) with no rainfall from November to May and heavy to very heavy rainfall from June to October.

Climate data for Kartong
Month	Jan	Feb	Mar	Apr	May	Jun	Jul	Aug	Sep	Oct	Nov	Dec	Year
Mean daily maximum °C (°F)	31.5 (88.7)	32.9 (91.2)	33.8 (92.8)	32.8 (91.0)	32.0 (89.6)	31.5 (88.7)	30.4 (86.7)	29.9 (85.8)	30.4 (86.7)	31.8 (89.2)	32.3 (90.1)	31.1 (88.0)	31.7 (89.0)
Daily mean °C (°F)	23.5 (74.3)	24.5 (76.1)	25.7 (78.3)	25.7 (78.3)	26.3 (79.3)	27.0 (80.6)	26.9 (80.4)	26.4 (79.5)	26.5 (79.7)	27.0 (80.6)	26.0 (78.8)	23.7 (74.7)	25.8 (78.4)
Mean daily minimum °C (°F)	15.5 (59.9)	16.1 (61.0)	17.6 (63.7)	18.7 (65.7)	20.6 (69.1)	22.5 (72.5)	23.4 (74.1)	23.0 (73.4)	22.7 (72.9)	22.3 (72.1)	19.7 (67.5)	16.3 (61.3)	19.9 (67.8)
Average rainfall mm (inches)	0 (0)	0 (0)	0 (0)	0 (0)	2 (0.1)	65 (2.6)	240 (9.4)	390 (15.4)	263 (10.4)	77 (3.0)	2 (0.1)	1 (0.0)	1,040 (41)
Source: Climate-Data.org
