= Kenji Nishioka =

Filipino footballer (born 2001)

Personal information
- Full name: Kenji Manangan Nishioka
- Date of birth: 9 June 2001 (age 25)
- Place of birth: Quezon City, Philippines
- Height: 1.75 m (5 ft 9 in)
- Position: Attacking midfielder

Team information
- Current team: Isenmulang Kalteng
- Number: 14

Youth career
- 2008–2014: Omiya Taisei Sports Club
- 2014–2016: Club Yono
- 2017–2019: Seibudai High School

College career
Years	Team	Apps	(Gls)
2020–2023	Josai University		

Senior career*
Years	Team	Apps	(Gls)
2024	Edo All United		
2025–2026	Manila Digger	37	(17)
2026–	Isenmulang Kalteng	3	(0)

International career^{‡}
2026–	Philippines	2	(0)
- * Club domestic league appearances and goals as of 19 September 2026 ‡ National team caps and goals as of 9 June 2026

Kenji Manangan Nishioka (西岡 健二, Nishioka Kenji; born 9 June 2001) is a Filipino footballer who plays as an attacking midfielder for Super League club Isenmulang Kalteng and the Philippines national team.

== Personal life ==
Nishioka was born in Quezon City in Metro Manila, but played his youth football in Japan.

== Youth career ==
Nishi first played youth football in Saitama, playing for Club Yono in his junior high school years. In 2017, he started playing for Seibudai High School, participating in the 2019 National High School Athletic Meet Soccer Tournament.

After graduating in 2020, he entered Josai University and played for the school's football team, including matches in the 2nd division of the Kantō Soccer League.

== Career ==
=== Edo All United ===
After graduating from college, Nishioka would play for Edo All United in the Kanto Soccer League's top division. However, at the end of the year he left the club after his contract expired, looking for more playing time.

=== Manila Digger ===
Nishioka would sign with Manila Digger of the Philippines Football League in his home country, helping the team finish runner-up in the PFL and qualify for the AFC Challenge League.

At the start of the 2025–26 season Nishioka became a first-team fixture, playing for the team in their AFC Champions League Two playoff against Persib Bandung and in the Challenge League. In the knockouts, he scored his first continental goal in a win over Dewa United.

=== Isenmulang Kalteng ===
On 22 July 2026, Nishioka officially completed a transfer to Super League club Isenmulang Kalteng, marking his first venture into Indonesian football following his extensive career in Japan, and the Philippines. Nishioka made his league debut for Isenmulang Kalteng on 4 September 2026, playing as a substituted in a 4–0 away lose over Arema at the Kanjuruhan Stadium.

== International career ==
Nishioka was born in the Philippines to a Filipino father and a Japanese mother. He was called up to the Philippines national team for a set of friendlies in June 2026.

== Honors ==
Manila Digger

- Philippines Football League: 2025–26
