= Dean Ebarle =

Filipino footballer (born 1998)

Personal information
- Full name: Major Dean Dungog Ebarle
- Date of birth: April 20, 1998 (age 28)
- Place of birth: Cebu City, Philippines
- Position: Left-back

Team information
- Current team: Maharlika
- Number: 20

Youth career
- Kaya Elite
- Abellana National School

College career
Years	Team	Apps	(Gls)
–2018	College of Saint Benilde		

Senior career*
Years	Team	Apps	(Gls)
2018–2019	Kaya–Iloilo	2	(0)
2019–2020	Mendiola 1991	8	(0)
2020–2021	ADT	3	(0)
2021–2022	Stallion Laguna	3	(0)
2022–2023	United City	12	(0)
2023–2025	Manila Digger	31	(1)
2025–	Maharlika	9	(0)

International career^{‡}
2012–2013	Philippines U17	3	(0)
2015–2016	Philippines U19	2	(1)
2019	Philippines U23	6	(0)
- * Club domestic league appearances and goals as of 05:57, March 11, 2026 (UTC) ‡ National team caps and goals as of 07:01, July 25, 2024 (UTC)

Major Dean Dungog Ebarle (born 20 April 1998) is a Filipino professional footballer who plays as a full-back for Philippines Football League club Maharlika, which he co-captains.

== Personal life ==
Ebarle was born in Cebu City in the Philippines. At the age of six, he started playing football for Abellana National School, first trying out for the school's football team as it was near City Central School where he studied. Though his father wanted him to try basketball, he persisted with the team until he got to play at the club level and for the youth teams of the Philippines. In college, he took up Human resource management before pursuing football.

== College career ==
Ebarle played college football for the team of the College of Saint Benilde, where he emerged as one of the stars of the team. In 2018, his senior year, he scored a crucial equalizer for Benilde in the NCAA finals, where he scored in the penalty shootout to help them win their first title in 8 years.

== Club career ==
=== Debut for Kaya and early pro career ===
While also playing for Benidle, he also played football for the U19 team of Kaya–Iloilo of the Philippines Football League. In February 2018, he was promoted to the senior team, and played two matches that season, including the closing fixture against Global, where he was a starter in 1–0 win. He later transferred to San Beda-based team Mendiola FC 1991 for the 2019 PFL season, making 8 appearances.

=== Career in the PFL ===
After the 2019 SEA Games, Ebarle played for a number of clubs in the PFL. 2020 saw him play with the Azkals Development Team with a lot of his former U23 teammates. On the third matchday of the 2020 PFL, he assisted Jarvey Gayoso to score the club's first-ever goal in the competition. The season after, he signed with Stallion Laguna, though the season was subsequently cancelled due to the COVID-19 pandemic. He played for the club in the latter half of the year in the 2021 Copa Paulino Alcantara, where Stallion finished third.

In 2022, he signed for league heavyweights United City and was a part of a massive recruitment of players for the 2022 AFC Champions League. He started the club's opening matchday, a narrow 1–0 loss against Jeonnam Dragons. He played for them for the first half of the 2022–23 PFL season, though his stint at the club was cut short as United City withdrew from the league, citing investor issues with Riau Capital Live.

=== Return to pro football ===
In 2023, after a short career break, Ebarle would make his return to professional football with Manila Digger, a club who were competing in the expanded 2023 Copa Paulino Alcantara. Though the club had an unsuccessful campaign and finished bottom of their group, he continued on with the club as they strengthened ahead of the 2024 PFL season. On the 12th matchday, he scored his first professional goal in a 7–0 rout of Don Bosco Garelli, as Digger finished 7th overall.

== International career ==
=== Philippines U17 ===
Ebarle first experienced national team football in March 2012, when he was selected by coach Oliver Colina to be a part of the team dubbed the "Little Azkals", participating in a training camp in Cebu. He played there alongside players such as Kintaro Miyagi, Marco Casambre, and Mark Winhoffer. The next year would see the team and participate in the 2013 AFF U16 Championship.

=== Philippines U19 ===
He would get another call-up, this time for the Philippines U19 team, for the 2015 AFF U19 Championship. The Philippines would finish 4th in the group stage with one win over Brunei. A year later he would get another call up, this time for the 2016 edition of the AFF U19 Championship. Though the Philippines would finish bottom, he scored his first goal for the team in the penultimate matchday, a late goal against Vietnam in a 4–3 thriller.

=== Philippines U23 ===
His next stint was with the Philippine National U23 team, where he received his first call-up for the 2019 AFF U22 Championship, where the country finished last once more. He made his debut coming off the bench for Ray Sanciangco in the opening match against Vietnam in a 2–1 loss. He was called up again for the 2020 AFC U23 Championship Qualifiers. He also joined the country for the 2019 Merlion Cup in preparation for the 2019 SEA Games that the Philippines would be hosting later that year, though he didn't make the final squad for the tournament.
