= Modou Joof =

Gambian footballer (born 2002)

Personal information
- Full name: Modou Joof
- Date of birth: 1 October 2002 (age 24)
- Place of birth: Essau, The Gambia
- Position: Centre-back

Team information
- Current team: Manila Digger
- Number: 20

Youth career
- 2010–2016: Gambia Ports Authority

Senior career*
Years	Team	Apps	(Gls)
2016–2021	Gambia Ports Authority		
2021–2022	Guédiawaye		
2022–2023	CR Bernoussi		
2023–2024	BST Galaxy		
2024–	Manila Digger	26	(4)

International career
2020	Gambia U20		
- * Club domestic league appearances and goals as of 5:44, 5 March 2026 (UTC)

Modou Joof (born 1 October 2002) is a Gambian professional footballer who plays as a centre-back for Philippines Football League club Manila Digger.

== Club career ==
=== Gambia ===
Joof was born in Essau in northwestern Gambia. Starting at 8 years old, he played youth football for Gambia Ports Authority before continuing to play for their senior team in 2016, which got him noticed by national team coaches. In 2021, he moved to Senegal to play for Guédiawaye.

=== Morocco ===
In August 2022, Joof signed for Botola Pro 2 side CR Bernoussi. Though he signed a three-year contract with the Moroccan team, he departed in 2023, returning to Gambia to play for BST Galaxy.

=== Philippines ===
it was announced in mid 2024 that Joof would be departing BST Galaxy, joining fellow Gambian players Saikou Ceesay and Modou Manneh in signing for Manila Digger of the Philippines Football League.

After a solid first season at the club, Joof stayed with Digger for the next PFL season. He would also see action in the club's continental campaigns, representing them in the AFC Challenge League and scoring a goal as Digger lost to Persib Bandung of Indonesia in the AFC Champions League Two.

== International career ==
=== Gambia U20 ===
While playing for GPA, Joof was called up to the Gambia under-20 national team in October 2020 as part of the preparation ahead of the 2020 WAFU U-20 tournament. In November, Gambia won, qualifying for the 2021 U-20 Africa Cup of Nations.

== Honours ==
Manila Digger

- Philippines Football League: 2025–26
