= Modou Manneh =

Gambian footballer (born 2001)

Personal information
- Full name: Modou Manneh
- Date of birth: 13 February 2001 (age 25)
- Place of birth: Janjanbureh, The Gambia
- Position: Midfielder

Team information
- Current team: Isenmulang Kalteng
- Number: 12

Youth career
- Centermass FC

Senior career*
Years	Team	Apps	(Gls)
2019	Brikama United		
2020–2024	Real de Banjul	4+	(4+)
2024–2026	Manila Digger	35	(19)
2026–	Isenmulang Kalteng	3	(0)

International career^{‡}
2020–2021	Gambia U20	6	(0)
- * Club domestic league appearances and goals as of 22:00, 19 September 2026 (UTC) ‡ National team caps and goals as of 6 January 2026

Modou Manneh (born 13 February 2001) is a Gambian professional football player who currently plays as a midfielder for Super League club Isenmulang Kalteng. He has also represented Gambia at the U20 level.

== Club career ==
=== Career in Gambia ===
Manneh was born in the town of Janjanbureh (formerly known as Georgetown) in the Gambia, and grew up in the nearby village of Yoro Beri Kunda. He played youth football in the village streets, and later played for local youth team Centermass FC.

At the end of 2020, Manneh signed for Real de Banjul of the GFA League First Division, then playing as a full-back for the team. Over the next four years, he won three titles with the club, also receiving a special recognition award for representing the country internationally.

=== Manila Digger ===
In 2025, Manneh was signed by Manila Digger of the Philippines Football League ahead of the 2024–25 season. Now playing as a midfielder, that season he contributed 12 goals and 6 assists as Digger narrowly lost the title on the final day to Kaya–Iloilo, being recognized as the team's best midfielder.

On March 29, 2025, Manneh was involved in a scuffle after scoring in a match against Stallion Laguna. He was sent off after an altercation with Stallion's assistant coach, which prompted a review by the PFF's Disciplinary and Ethics Committee.

Manneh stayed with Manila Digger for the 2025–26 season as the club competed in AFC competitions for the first time. He started in their AFC Champions League Two playoff defeat to Persib Bandung of Indonesia, and was a starter in the club's campaign in the AFC Challenge League, where they qualified for the knockout rounds.

== International career ==
=== Gambia U20 ===
In 2019, Manneh represented the Gambia under-20 national team at the WAFU Zone A U-20 Championship, where Gambia won in the final over Senegal, qualifying for the Africa U-20 Cup of Nations. At the tournament, Gambia finished third after beating Tunisia in the third place match.

=== Gambia U23 ===
A year later, Manneh was called up to the Gambia under-23 team for qualifiers for the 2023 U-23 Africa Cup of Nations, but did not play a match.

== Honours ==
Manila Digger

- Philippines Football League: 2025–26

Individual

- Philippines Football League: Golden Ball 2025–26
