= Saikou Ceesay =

Gambian footballer (born 2000)

Personal information
- Full name: Saikouba Ceesay
- Date of birth: 8 April 2000 (age 26)
- Place of birth: The Gambia
- Height: 1.80 m (5 ft 11 in)
- Position: Striker

Team information
- Current team: Manila Digger
- Number: 10

Senior career*
Years	Team	Apps	(Gls)
–2016	Brikama United		
2017–2022	Gambia Armed Forces		(13)
2022–2024	BK Milan		
2023–2024	→ Guédiawaye (loan)		
2024–	Manila Digger	18	(17)
- * Club domestic league appearances and goals as of 26 April 2025

Saikouba Ceesay (born 8 April 2000) is a Gambian professional footballer who plays as a striker for Manila Digger in the Philippines Football League.

== Club career ==
=== Gambia Armed Forces ===
As a teenager, Ceesay played for Gambian lower division club Brikama United. In 2016, he scored to help them get promoted to the GFA League First Division. He would play for the team again in 2022.

In 2017, he signed for Gambia Armed Forces in the same league, where he stayed there for 5 seasons until 2022. In 2021, he won the golden boot in the Gambian First Division, scoring 13 goals.

=== BK Milan ===
In 2022, Ceesay transferred to BK Milan, a side in the Gambian second division. He was also subsequently loaned out to Guédiawaye FC of the Senegal Ligue 1 a year later in 2023, scoring his first goal against Stade de Mbour. His team would finish that season in 4th, with Ceesay returning to Milan at the season's end.

=== Manila Digger ===
Ceesay next signed with Manila Digger in the Philippines Football League, playing alongside Gambian compatriots Modou Manneh, Modou Joof, and Pa Ousman Gai. On his debut against One Taguig he scored a goal to make it 2–1, though Digger ended up losing the match 3–1. He scored his second goal in two games with a header against Mendiola 1991.

== International career ==
=== Gambia U23 ===
While playing for Gambian Armed Forces, Ceesay was included in the list of players called up to the Gambia U23 National Team for friendlies against Morocco in 2018.

== Honours ==
Manila Digger

- Philippines Football League: 2025–26
