= Manila Digger F.C. =

Manila Digger
- Full name: Manila Digger Football Club
- Nickname: The Golden Miners
- Short name: MND
- Founded: 2018; 8 years ago
- Ground: Rizal Memorial Stadium
- Capacity: 12,873
- Owner: Shuo Sha
- Head coach: Joan Esteva
- League: Philippines Football League
- 2025–26: Philippines Football League, 1st of 11 (champion)
- Website: maniladiggerfc.com
Home colours	Away colours	Third colours

Manila Digger Football Club is a Filipino professional football club based in Taguig, Manila which currently plays in the Philippines Football League, the top flight division in the country. The club was founded in 2018.

The club won its first major honours after winning the 2025–26 Philippines Football League.

== History ==
=== Foundation and early years (2018–2022) ===
Manila Digger's foundation can be traced back in 2017 when a community of Chinese migrants in Manila who were working and studying in the Philippines formed an amateur football club. In 2018, a group led by Chinese investor Sha Shuo splintered from this amateur team over internal disagreements to form Manila Digger Football Club. The team was named "digger" to reflect the Chinese founders' aspiration to make a good living in the country.

Manila Digger competed in the weekend amateur leagues during its early years playing both in the standard 11-a-side and the 7-a-side formats. A women's team was also formed. Originally an all-Chinese team, Manila Digger began recruiting Filipinos and non-Chinese foreigners.

=== Entry to the top flight division (2017–2024) ===
Manila Digger began their journey in professional football in the 2023 edition of the Copa Paulino Alcantara. They did not advanced from the group stage.

The club then earned a license on 17 January 2024 as documented on Sha's Bilibili account "Caogen Zuqiu Jingli" (Chinese: 草根足球经理, lit. 'Grassroots Football Manager') where he paid the relevant registration fee, for his club be eligible to compete in the Philippines Football League (PFL). The account was used to build a fanbase for Manila Digger.

The Diggers' starting lineup against Persib in the AFC Champions League Two qualifying play-offs

Manila Digger made their PFL debut in the 2024 season. In the leadup to their eventual debut in March, Sha and Diao Su recruited players through their personal connections with scouts and relied on informal methods such as leads the club got through social media. A WeChat fan group was also instrumental to Manila Digger's recruitment. Diao himself was also a player and became the first Chinese player to debut in the PFL in April 2024. The team finished eight out of fifteen teams in the league table.

During the 2024–25 season, Manila Digger fell one point away to eventual league champions Kaya–Iloilo, but nonetheless qualified for the 2025–26 AFC Champions League Two qualifying play-off against Indonesian champions Persib Bandung. The club also participated in the Finals Series, beating One Taguig in the semi-final following a late goal from Ousman Gai in the 83rd minute winning 2–1. The club would eventually lose to Cebu 0–1 missing out on the ASEAN Club Championship.

=== First league title and continental breakthrough (2025–present) ===
On 13 August 2025, Manila Digger made their continental debut against Persib Bandung in the AFC Champions League Two qualification play-off round where they would eventually lose 2–1, but Modou Joof made history becoming the first Digger player to score in a continental competition. Following AFC's continental competition format, Manila Digger qualified in the AFC Challenge League as the losers of the qualification play-off in AFC Champions League Two where they were drawn in group D, alongside Laotian club Ezra, Mongolian club SP Falcons and Cambodian club Preah Khan Reach Svay Rieng. Manila Diggers manage to win 3–1 against Ezra, 2–0 against SP Falcons and a 2–2 draw against Preah Khan Reach Svay Rieng thus seeing the team finishing as runners-up and qualifying to the knockout stages. In the quarter-finals, Manila Diggers faced off against Indonesian club Dewa United where they managed to defeat them 3–2 on aggregate thus advancing to the semi-finals. However in the next round against Preah Khan Reach Svay Rieng, the club suffered a 4–1 on aggregated defeat thus knocking out from the competition.

==== 2025–26 AFC Challenge League ====

Manila Diggers 2025–26 Philippines Football League season champions starting line-ups.

On 26 October 2025, the club made history by winning their first AFC Challenge League match against Ezra 3–1, becoming the first Filipino side to win a match in the AFC competition since Ceres in 2014. Ousman Gai and Dilane Wamba scored in the first half and Baboucarr Touray would follow up a third goal for Manila Digger in the second half. Manila Digger would win their second match against Mongolian side SP Falcons 2–0 with a goal from Saikou Ceesay in the first half and then followed by a final goal by fellow Gambian compatriot Gai in the second half to finish off the game. Manila Digger qualified for the knockout stage. Manila Digger finished runners up in group D after drawing 2–2 against Preah Khan Reach Svay Rieng. The club faced Indonesian Dewa United Banten in the knockout stage and hosted the first leg, where Manila Digger went on to win 1–0. Manila Digger would secure a 2–2 draw in Indonesia, winning on a 3–2 aggregate score to advance in the semi-finals, where they lost to Preah Khan Reach Svay Rieng.

Manila Digger entered the 2025–26 Philippines Football League season seeking to establish itself among the leading clubs in Philippine football. The team finished first in the regular season before maintaining its position during the championship round. On 17 June 2026, Manila Digger secured its first PFL title after drawing 1–1 against One Taguig in its final match of the campaign. Manila Digger finished the championship round with 60 points from 25 matches, two points ahead of One Taguig, to claim its maiden top-flight championship. The club's attacking performance was led by Gambian Ousman Gai, who finished as the league's top scorer with 29 goals.

== Team image ==
=== Crest and colors ===
The club traditionally plays in yellow and red kits, the colors of the Chinese flag, to signify its Chinese roots. The club's crest features a shield shape with yellow and red base colors and a monicker of the club's name is placed in the center.

== Kit manufacturers and shirt sponsors ==
Period	Kit manufacturer	Sponsor
2023–2024	(China) UCAN	(Philippines) OKFly^{1}
2024–2025	(China) UCAN	(Philippines) Zealand Metal^{1} (Philippines) OKFly^{2}
2025–present	(China) UCAN	(Philippines) Zealand Metal^{1} (Philippines) Prime Rehabilitation, (Netherlands) Starbalm^{2} (Philippines) Yison^{3}

- ^{1} Major sponsor
- ^{2} Secondary sponsor
- ^{3} Sleeves

== Players ==
=== Current squad ===
As of 29 August 2026

Note: Flags indicate national team as defined under FIFA eligibility rules; some limited exceptions apply. Players may hold more than one non-FIFA nationality.

No.	Pos.	Nation	Player
1	GK	PHI	Michael Asong
2	DF	GAM	Ansumana Gomez
4	MF	GAM	Assan Badjie
5	FW	CMR	Dilane Wamba
6	DF	GHA	Daniel Ashley
8	MF	NGR	Ifeanyi Ugwu
10	FW	GAM	Saikou Ceesay
11	FW	GAM	Baboucarr Touray
14	FW	PHI	Rico Andes
16	GK	GAM	Omar Njie
17	MF	PHI	Dylan De Bruycker
18	MF	GAM	Edward Ndecky

No.	Pos.	Nation	Player
19	DF	PHI	Johnmar Barsanilla
20	DF	GAM	Modou Joof
21	GK	CIV	Dini Ouattara
22	DF	PHI	Zachary Taningco
23	DF	GAM	David Sambou
24	MF	PHI	Denzel Vasquez
26	DF	PHI	Ken Pryde
27	MF	PHI	Justin Kihm
30	DF	PHI	Charles Dabao
41	MF	GAM	Modou Kanteh
98	FW	PHI	Troy Limbo

== Management and staff ==
As of July 2026

Position	Staff
Team manager	(China) Ying Chen
Head coach	(Spain) Joan Esteva
Assistant coach	(China) Mengyang Liu
Assistant coach	(China) Shuo Sha
Assistant coach	(China) Su Diao
Assistant coach	(Spain) Joan Esteva Jr.
Goalkeeper coach	(Philippines) Kim Versales
Chief analyst	(China) Shengyang Song

== Honours ==
=== League ===
- Philippines Football League
  - Winners (1): 2025–26
  - Runners-up (1): 2024–25

=== Cup ===
- Philippines Football League Finals Series
  - Runners-up (1): 2024–25

== Notable players ==
Since 2024, Manila Digger has recruited several Gambian players as part of its squad-building strategy, including Ousman Gai, Saikou Ceesay, Baboucarr Touray, Modou Joof and Modou Manneh. The Gambian contingent played a significant role in the club's development and the club has bought in more Gambian players in the later season to strengthen their squad.

=== International capped players ===
AFC/OFC.: –NIL–	CAF.: (The Gambia) Modou Joof; (The Gambia) Modou Manneh	UEFA.: –NIL–	CONMEBOL/ CONCACAF.: –NIL–

== Managerial history ==
Name	Period	Achievements
(Nigeria) Lerche Njang	2023	
(Philippines) Pong Liman	2023–2024	
(Spain) Oriol Mohedano	2024	
(Spain) Juan Manuel Saez	2024–2025	
(Philippines) Kim Versales	2025	
(China) Li Haijun	2025–2026	2025–26 Philippines Football League
(Spain) Joan Esteva	2026–present	

== Club captains ==
Years	Captain
2024	(South Korea) Shin Min-ki
2024–2025	(Philippines) Dean Ebarle
2025–2026	(Philippines) Shirmar Felongco
2026–present	(The Gambia) Modou Joof

== Season by season record ==
Season	Division	League Position	Copa Paulino Alcantara
2023	Did not participate		Group stage
2024	PFL	7th	–
2024–25	PFL	Runner-ups (League)	–
2024–25	PFL	Runner-ups (Final series)	–
2025–26	PFL	Champions	–

== Continental record ==
Competition	Q	Pld	W	D	L	GF	GA	GD	W %
AFC Champions League Two	2	2	0	0	2	1	3	−2	0.00
AFC Challenge League	2	10	5	4	1	21	10	+11	50.00
ASEAN Club Championship	1	3	2	0	1	9	3	+6	66.67
Total	5	15	7	4	4	31	16	+15	46.67

Season	Competition	Round	Club	Home	Away	Aggregate
2025–26	AFC Champions League Two	Preliminary stage	(Indonesia) Persib	1–2		
2025–26	AFC Challenge League	Group stage	(Laos) Ezra	3–1		2nd
2025–26	AFC Challenge League	Group stage	(Mongolia) SP Falcons	2–0		2nd
2025–26	AFC Challenge League	Group stage	(Cambodia) PKR Svay Rieng	2–2		2nd
2025–26	AFC Challenge League	Quarter finals	(Indonesia) Dewa United Banten	1–0	2–2	3–2
2025–26	AFC Challenge League	Semi finals	(Cambodia) PKR Svay Rieng	0–3	1–1	1–4
2026–27	AFC Champions League Two	Preliminary stage	(Indonesia) Persib	0–1		
2026–27	AFC Challenge League	Group stage	(Brunei) Kasuka	5–0		1st
2026–27	AFC Challenge League	Group stage	(Chinese Taipei) Hang Yuan	1–1		1st
2026–27	AFC Challenge League	Group stage	(Myanmar) Shan United	4–0		1st
2026–27	AFC Challenge League	Quarter finals	(Chinese Taipei) Tainan City			
2026–27	ASEAN Club Championship	Qualifying play-offs	(Brunei) Kasuka	5–1	4–1	9–2
2026–27	ASEAN Club Championship	Group A	(Indonesia) Borneo		0–1	TBC
2026–27	ASEAN Club Championship	Group A	(Thailand) Ratchaburi			TBC
2026–27	ASEAN Club Championship	Group A	(Thailand) Buriram United			TBC
2026–27	ASEAN Club Championship	Group A	(Singapore) Tampines Rovers			TBC
2026–27	ASEAN Club Championship	Group A	(Malaysia) Kuching City			TBC
2026–27	ASEAN Club Championship	Group A	(Vietnam) Cong An Ho Chi Minh City			TBC

== See also ==
- Manila Digger (women)
