= Mendiola F.C. 1991 =

Filipino association football club based in Imus City

- Full name: Mendiola Football Club 1991
- Nicknames: Los Valientes Hijos de Mendiola (The Brave Sons of Mendiola)
- Short name: MEN
- Founded: 1991; 35 years ago as Mendiola 1991
- Ground: City of Imus Grandstand and Track Oval
- Capacity: 4,800
- President: Ramoncito Inocencio
- Head coach: Dan Padernal
- League: Philippines Football League
- 2025–26: Philippines Football League, 10th of 11
Home colours	Away colours	Third colours

Mendiola Football Club 1991 is a Philippine professional football club. The club is named after the Mendiola Street, a short thoroughfare in the San Miguel district of Manila. It is one of the founding members of United Football League, which was last competing in the 2009–10 season. The club currently plays in the Philippines Football League, the top-flight league of football in the Philippines.

== History ==
Mendiola 1991's roots can be traced back to the football program of San Beda College (now San Beda University). It all began in the summer of 1991, the San Beda senior football team based in Mendiola Street joined a prestigious league held in Manila which was composed of the armed forces teams, various clubs and universities. Due to lack of available players, they decided to invite more players from different universities, thus forming the Mendiola Football Club, which resulted to a respectable 4th-place finish in the said tournament.

Following the success, the club has grown and became one of the pioneering teams joining the first semi-professional league in 1997, Manila Premier Football League.

In 1997, Mendiola joined the U19 Adidas Cup clinching the tournament's title.

Since then, the club has been consistently participating in first and second division football leagues throughout the country, such as Globe Super Cup 2001, Filipino Premier League 2008, United Football League from 2009 to 2011 and in the 2011 Smart National Football Club Championship under the banner Smart-San Beda FC where they finished 2nd overall.

=== PFF National Men's Club Championship ===
At the 2011 PFF National Men's Club Championship, Mendiola played under the name Smart San Beda F.C. for sponsorship reasons. Global Teknika emerged the champions after defeating them in a 3–2 aggregate score in the finals.

In 2012, the club resurgent by joining the 2012–13 UFL Cup and defeating FC Masbate 4–0 in Stage 1.

=== Philippine Premier League ===
Mendiola was announced by the Philippine Premier League organizers as one of the seven teams of the league's inaugural season in 2019. However Mendiola was ruled ineligible to play for the 2019 season by the Philippine Football Federation due to licensing issues. The start of the league was delayed to April 2019 to allow Mendiola and Philippine Air Force settle their licensing issues. However, the league itself folded after the Philippine Football Federation (PFF) revoked its sanction.

=== Philippines Football League ===
After the dissolution of the short-lived PPL, Mendiola along with Philippine Air Force joined the revived Philippines Football League. They debuted in the 2019 season under a provisional license and placed fifth out of seven clubs.

Prior to the start of the 2020 season, the club announced that Ricardo Penson, a sponsor, is funding the construction of a stadium in San Beda's campus in Taytay, Rizal which will serve as the home venue of the club. The venue is part of the club's final requirement to acquire a full club license from the PFF. However, for most of the 2020 season, the club held home matches at the Rizal Memorial Stadium in Manila and is negotiation with the local government of Imus, Cavite to host later matches at the Imus Grandstand.

In 2021, Mendiola secured an AFC club license for the first time making them eligible to qualify for the AFC Cup.

In 2025, Mendiola underwent a rebrand after receiving sponsorship from Pureblends Corporation of Bryann Calantoc.

== Personnel ==
As of 3 March 2020

Position	Name
Team manager	(Philippines) Erwin Isla
Head coach	(Philippines) Dan Padernal
Assistant head coach	(Philippines) Nhiboy Pedimonte
Assistant head coach	(Philippines) Jake Cuaycong
Goalkeeping coach	(Philippines) Anton Albao

== Players ==
As of 10 September 2026

Note: Flags indicate national team as defined under FIFA eligibility rules; some limited exceptions apply. Players may hold more than one non-FIFA nationality.

No.	Pos.	Nation	Player
2	MF	UGA	Joshua Ssentambule
3	DF	PHI	Reggie Sulit
4	DF	UGA	Bakali Magumda
7	MF	PHI	Nicolai Abalos
8	MF	ENG	Rhys Williams
9	FW	NGA	Divine Uguafakwu
10	FW	PHI	Nikko Arañas (Captain)
11	FW	ENG	Yash Rai Vij
12	FW	PHI	Zach Valeria
13	MF	UGA	Hussein Ssajjabbi
14	DF	PHI	Victor Felicia
15	DF	USA	Giovanni Martino
16	MF	USA	Remedy Zlehwolo
17	FW	ITA	Léo Anthony
18	FW	USA	Brian Chang
20	GK	PHI	Marc Pellejo

No.	Pos.	Nation	Player
21	MF	JPN	Yuya Kashiwabara
22	DF	PHI	Isaac Johnson
23	GK	JPN	Kaede Kosaka
28	DF	PHI	Amir Aningalan
30	FW	PHI	Tristan Mendoza
32	FW	PHI	Keezer Oquias
33	MF	BEL	Najmedine El Hallabi
37	DF	ENG	Luke Bishop
38	MF	PHI	Dunne Banagodos
47	FW	JPN	Kai Kimura
70	FW	NGA	Onyeka Obi
71	FW	PHI	David Pusing
76	DF	ENG	Tom Unsworth
88	MF	PHI	Julian Perilla
99	MF	CAN	Ryan Tahmasebi

== Crest ==
Mendiola crest history
As Mendiola 1991 (1991–2025; 2026–present)

As Valenzuela PB–Mendiola (2025–2026)

== Kit manufacturers and shirt sponsors ==
Period	Kit Manufacturer	Shirt Partner
2019–	FAT Indonesia	Penson & Company Inc.^{1} Focus Athletics ^{2}

- ^{1} Major shirt sponsor (names located at the front of the shirt).
- ^{2} Secondary sponsor (names mostly located at the sleeves and at the back of the shirt).

=== Kit evolution ===
==== Home ====
2019

==== Away ====
2019	2020

== Honors ==
=== Domestic ===
==== Cups ====
- PFF National Men's Club Championship
  - Runners-up: 2011

== Records ==
Season	Division	Tms.	Pos.	National cup (Note: PFF National Men's Club Championship (2011–2015) and Copa Paulino Alcantara (2018–present))	League cup	AFC Champions League	AFC Cup	Other cups
1995	Did not participate							
1996	No national league							
1997	1	8	7th					
1998–2007	No national league							
2008–09	1	8	4th					
2009–10	1	8	8th		Quarter-finals			
2010–11	Did not participate			2nd				
2011–12	3	18	2nd		—			
2012–13	3	8	3rd	DNQ	Group stage			
2013–14	3	8	3rd	DNQ	Withdrew			1st
2014–15	2	7	5th	Group stage	Round of 16			
2015–16	Did not participate				—	—		
2016–17	Did not participate							First round
2017–18	5	7	3rd	—				
2019	1	7	5th	Semi-final				
2020	1	6	4th	Canceled				
2021	1	7	Canceled	5th				
2022	—	—	—	7th				
2022–23	1	5	4th	Quarter-finals				
2024	1	15	10th	—	—	—	—	—
2024–25	1	10	10th	—	—	—	—	—
This record list is updated as of May 8, 2025

Key

- Tms. = Number of teams
- Pos. = Position in league
- TBD = To be determined
- DNQ = Did not qualify

Note: Performances of the club indicated here was after the Philippine Football League created (as a semi-pro league) in 1995.
