= 2023 Copa Paulino Alcantara final =

- Event: 2023 Copa Paulino Alcantara
Kaya–Iloilo	Davao Aguilas
1	1
- After extra time Kaya–Iloilo won 4–3 on penalties
- Date: December 9, 2023
- Venue: Rizal Memorial Stadium, Manila
- Man of the Match: Dini Ouattara (Davao Aguilas)
- Referee: Mick Jon Pineda
- Attendance: 1,107

The final of the fifth season of the Copa Paulino Alcantara was contested by Kaya–Iloilo and Davao Aguilas at the Rizal Memorial Stadium in Manila. It was the first time the two teams have faced each other since the inaugural final in 2018, where Kaya won 1–0.

== Background ==
Due to the restructuring of the PFL by the Philippine Football Federation and Liga Futbol Inc. and the withdrawals of the Azkals Development Team and United City from the league, the 2023 season of the Copa Paulino Alcantara was planned to act as a preview of the upcoming PFL season, with 17 teams participating in the group stages of the tournament that could potentially join the PFL after the tournament's conclusion. All five remaining PFL teams, including Kaya, were the first to confirm their participation in the tournament. Davao, who withdrew from the PFL at the end of the 2018 season, made their return to professional football in the Philippines.

Kaya, who lost the previous year's final to United City, were placed in Group A with teams such as UAAP champions Far Eastern University and rivals Loyola, and swept the group, scoring 40 goals and conceding 2. Kaya would also win all their knockout stage matches, including an 11–0 beating of the University of the Philippines and a close 4–2 aggregate win over fellow PFL team Stallion Laguna. Davao were placed in Group C and finished second behind Stallion, where they faced fellow new team CF Manila in the quarter-finals, beating them 2–0. In the semi-finals, Davao upset 2022–23 PFL runners-up Dynamic Herb Cebu through a long range strike by midfielder Paolo Bugas, winning the tie 2–1.

The final, which was initially scheduled for November 12, was rescheduled to December 9, and will be held at the Rizal Memorial Stadium, the stadium used for the majority of the tournament's matches. The 2023 final marks the first meeting between Kaya and Davao since the latter lost 1–0 in the final 5 years prior, after which Davao withdrew from the professional football scene for 5 years. Of those who played in the final, Kaya captain Jovin Bedic, defenders Audie Menzi and Camelo Tacusalme, midfielders Marwin Angeles and Arnel Amita, and striker Robert Lopez Mendy are the only players remaining, while none of Davao's 2018 roster are still with the squad. Serge Kaole, who came off the bench for Kaya in extra-time, now captains the Davao side while Marco Casambre, who played as full-back for the Aguilas in 2018, now plays for Kaya. Davao will be without the services of striker Ealwhine Dalam due to a red card the player received during stoppage time in the club's 1–1 semi-final draw with Dynamic Herb Cebu.

Due to the Asian Football Confederation's overhaul of the AFC club competitions, the winner of the final will qualify for the qualifying rounds of the 2024–25 AFC Champions League Two, potentially dropping down to the 2024–25 AFC Challenge League should they fail to qualify.

== Route to the final ==
Kaya–Iloilo				Round	Davao Aguilas			
Opponent	Result			Group stage	Opponent	Result		
Loyola	7–0			Matchday 1	Adamson University	2–0		
Don Bosco Garelli	11–0			Matchday 2	Tuloy	5–0		
Philippine Air Force	9–1			Matchday 3	Philippine Army	4–3		
CF Manila	8–0			Matchday 4	Mendiola 1991	3–3		
Far Eastern University	5–1			Matchday 5	Stallion Laguna	0–4		
Group A winners: Pos / Team / Pld / Pts; 1 / Kaya–Iloilo / 5 / 15; 2 / CF Manila / 5 / 10; 3 / Philippine Air Force / 5 / 7; 4 / Far Eastern University / 5 / 6; 5 / Loyola / 5 / 4; 6 / Don Bosco Garelli / 5 / 0; Source:				Final standings	Group C runners-up: Pos / Team / Pld / Pts; 1 / Stallion Laguna / 5 / 12; 2 / Davao Aguilas / 5 / 10; 3 / Mendiola 1991 / 5 / 9; 4 / Tuloy / 5 / 7; 5 / Philippine Army / 5 / 3; 6 / Adamson University / 5 / 1; Source:			
Opponent	Agg.	1st leg	2nd leg	Knockout phase	Opponent	Agg.	1st leg	2nd leg
University of the Philippines	11–0	3–0	8–0	Quarter-finals	CF Manila	2–0	1–0	1–0
Stallion Laguna	4–2	2–1	2–1	Semi-finals	Dynamic Herb Cebu	2–1	1–0	1–1

== Match summary ==
External videos
- 2022 Copa Paulino Alcantara Final
- Copa Paulino Alcantara 2023 Final - Kaya FC-Iloilo vs. Davao Aguilas UMak FC by the Philippines Football League

The final of the 2023 Copa Paulino Alcantara was held on neutral ground in Rizal Memorial Stadium in Manila, marking the first final to be played at the stadium since the inaugural final in 2018. Despite being based in Mindanao, Davao had been based in Makati since their reemergence as a professional club, and played their games at the University of Makati Stadium. Due to yellow card accumulations, Davao would be missing defender Pete Forrosuelo and attacker OJ Clariño. Ealwhine Dalam, who received a red card during stoppage time in the club's previous match against Dynamic Herb Cebu, would also be unavailable, while Ivorian defender Yohann Fofana returned from suspension after getting a red card as an unused substitute in the club's first leg match against Cebu. Kaya would be missing the services of national team forward Jarvey Gayoso, who had scored against Chinese side Shandong Taishan in the AFC Champions League a week prior. The match marked the first meeting between the two sides since the 2018 final, which saw Kaya captain Jovin Bedic score the winner in the dying minutes of the game, after which Davao withdrew from the PFL due to then-owner Jefferson Cheng's disagreements on the direction of the league.

Kaya nearly took the lead in the 10th minute, but Audie Menzi's header hit the post. Serge Kaole would forge Davao's first chance of the game 16 minutes later, but Quincy Kammeraad made a vital save. In the 30th minute Dini Ouattara chased down a loose pass and clattered into Arnel Amita, but the penalty shouts were waved off. Davao then took a surprise lead just before halftime as a free kick from Paolo Bugas caught the Kaya defense sleeping, with Yannick Tuason heading home. Kaya would up the tempo in the second half, and eventually got their reward in the 64th minute when Amita sneakily stole the ball off of Ouattara and chipped the ball over the keeper into the net to equalize. Kaya would nearly take the lead 8 minutes later as Yohann Fofana nearly poked the ball into his own net, while Davao defender Nicolas Ferrer Jr. would respond with a long range effort that hit the base of the post with 12 minutes remaining. In the 88th minute, substitute Robert Lopez Mendy, who provided the game-winning assist the last time the two teams met, thought he had scored the winner, but was flagged for offside.

The game ticked over into extra-time, the second time in Copa history that a final had done so, and Kaya would once again find themselves calling for another penalty for a handball on Fofana that was again dismissed. Davao were tiring due to the absence of key players and found themselves on the receiving end of most of the chances, but Ouattara was there to keep them from conceding, first denying an effort from Daizo Horikoshi in the 100th minute, then another effort from Mar Diano through a sea of bodies in the 120th minute. Desperate for a goal, Kaya subbed on captain Jovin Bedic, who scored the winner against Davao 5 years before, and would nearly do so again in the 2nd minute of stoppage time, but his header hit the crossbar and was cleared away by Axel Andres. The match went to penalties, where Paolo Bugas would score the first for Davao, while Ouattara again foiled Kaya and saved Lopez Mendy's penalty. Not to be outdone, Quincy Kammeraad would save two penalties from Tuason and Kaole, giving Kaya midfielder and national team player Justin Baas the opportunity to win a third title for the club. Ouattara again saved the penalty, but was found to be off his line and a retake was ordered, which Baas converted.

The match ended with Kaya triumphing over Davao once again, this time on penalties, to win their third title and first since 2021. Kaya players Audie Menzi and Jovin Bedic broke the record that they set last year of playing in the most finals, having appeared in every single one since 2018. Dini Ouattara, due to his excellent performance, was awarded the "Man of the Match" award, while Kaya forward Abou Sy won the Golden Boot, scoring 10 goals. Kaya's victory capped off a triumphant year for the club, having also won the PFL title in June, the 2023 PFF Women's League in November, and the PFF U18 Boys National Championship Division 2 title earlier that day against Palawan FA.

December 9, 2023
19:00 UTC+8

Kaya–Iloilo	1–1 (a.e.t.)	Davao Aguilas
Amita 64'		Tuason 45+2'
Penalties
Lopez Mendy (penalty missed); Bedic (penalty scored); Horikoshi (penalty scored); Menzi (penalty scored); Baas (penalty scored)	4–3	(penalty scored) Bugas; (penalty missed) Tuason; (penalty missed) Kaole; (penalty scored) K. Talaroc; (penalty scored) Limbo

Rizal Memorial Stadium, Manila
Attendance: 1,107
Referee: Mick Jon Pineda

Kaya–Iloilo	Davao Aguilas

GK	1	(Philippines) Quincy Kammeraad
44	(Philippines) Audie Menzi	(yellow card) 85'
3	(Japan) Akito Saito
23	(Philippines) Simone Rota	(substituted off) 75'
22	(Philippines) Fitch Arboleda (c)	(substituted off) 46'
21	(Argentina) Ricardo Sendra	(substituted off) 75'
16	(Philippines) Justin Baas
13	(Philippines) Jesus Melliza	(substituted off) 109'
20	(Japan) Daizo Horikoshi
77	(Senegal) Abou Sy	(substituted off) 67'
10	(Philippines) Arnel Amita	(substituted off) 91'
Substitutes:
GK	2	(Philippines) Kenry Balobo
5	(Philippines) Camelo Tacusalme
6	(Philippines) Mark Swainston
7	(Philippines) Jovin Bedic	(substituted on) 109'
8	(Philippines) Marwin Angeles	(substituted on) 75'
9	(Philippines) Eric Giganto
12	(Philippines) Mar Diano	(substituted on) 46'
15	(Philippines) Marco Casambre	(substituted on) 75'
17	(Senegal) Robert Lopez Mendy	(substituted on) 67'
19	(Philippines) Curt Dizon	(substituted on) 91'
Head Coach:
(Northern Ireland) Colum Curtis

GK	16	(Ivory Coast) Dini Ouattara
	14	(Philippines) Nicolas Ferrer Jr.		(substituted off) 120+1'
	5	(Philippines) Reynald Villareal	(yellow card) 40'
	19	(Ivory Coast) Yohann Fofana	(yellow card) 112'
	13	(Philippines) Kart Talaroc
	11	(Philippines) Marvin Angeles		(substituted off) 86'
	8	(Philippines) Jhomaray Sapal
	39	(Philippines) Paolo Bugas
	98	(Philippines) Troy Limbo
	9	(Philippines) Yannick Tuason
	15	(Cameroon) Serge Kaole (c)
Substitutes:
GK	1	(Philippines) Kenneth Guballo
	2	(Philippines) Joshua Jalog
	3	(Philippines) John Daohog
	4	(Philippines) Santino Rosales
	10	(Philippines) Billy Alcantara
	12	(Philippines) Rendon Cielo
	17	(Philippines) Richard Talaroc		(substituted on) 86'
	18	(Philippines) Romel Catarinin
	20	(Philippines) Francis Villa
	21	(Philippines) Christian Bacara
	27	(Philippines) Axel Andres		(substituted on) 120+1'
	29	(Philippines) Gansmari Antipuesto
Head Coach:
(Philippines) Aber Ruzgal
