= 2023 Copa Paulino Alcantara knockout stage =

Knockout stage of Copa Paulino Alcantara 2023

The knockout stage of the 2023 Copa Paulino Alcantara, the domestic cup competition of the Philippines, began on 29 September with the quarter-finals, and concluded on 9 December 2023 with the final played at Rizal Memorial Stadium. Eight teams competed in the knockout stage, which included six teams which played in the Philippines Football League along with the University of the Philippines and CF Manila, which had never played in the said league.

== Schedule ==
The draw for both the group and knockout stage was held on 17 June 2023.

Stage	Round	First leg	Second leg
Knockout stage	Quarter-finals	29–30 September 2023	8–9 October 2023
Knockout stage	Semi-finals	21 October 2023	3 November 2023
Knockout stage	Final	9 December 2023	

== Format ==
Each tie in the knockout stage, apart from the final, was played over two legs. The team that scored more goals on aggregate over the two legs advanced to the next round. If the aggregate score was level, then 30 minutes of extra time were played. If the score was still level at the end of extra time, the winners were decided by a penalty shoot-out. In the final, which was played as a single match, if the score was still level at the end of normal time, extra time was played, followed by a penalty shoot-out if the score was still level.

== Bracket ==
The bracket was decided during the main draw held on 17 June 2023. A third place match was supposed to be held on the same day as the final, but was later cancelled due to scheduling conflicts.

Quarter-finals
Kaya–Iloilo	3	8	11
UP	0	0	0
Stallion Laguna	5	4	9
Maharlika Manila	0	0	0
Dynamic Herb Cebu	2	4	6
Mendiola 1991	0	1	1
CF Manila	0	0	0
Davao Aguilas	1	1	2

Semi-finals
Kaya–Iloilo	2	2	4
Stallion Laguna	1	1	2
Dynamic Herb Cebu	0	1	1
Davao Aguilas	1	1	2

Final
Kaya–Iloilo	1(4)
Davao Aguilas	1(3)

== Quarter-finals ==
=== Summary ===
Team 1	Agg.	Team 2	1st leg	2nd leg
Kaya–Iloilo	11–0	University of the Philippines	3–0	8–0
Stallion Laguna	9–0	Maharlika Manila	5–0	4–0
Dynamic Herb Cebu	6–1	Mendiola 1991	2–0	4–1
CF Manila	0–2	Davao Aguilas	0–1	0–1

=== Matches ===
September 29, 2023
16:00 UTC+8

Kaya–Iloilo	3–0	University of the Philippines
Gayoso 13', 53'; Lopez Mendy 83'

Rizal Memorial Stadium
Referee: John Mike Basinang
October 8, 2023
16:00 UTC+8

University of the Philippines	0–8	Kaya–Iloilo
		Diano 40'; Sy 42', 45+1'; Baas 44'; Lopez Mendy 64'; Dizon 86'; Giganto 88', 90'

Rizal Memorial Stadium
Referee: Meliton Pelayo

Kaya–Iloilo won 11–0 on aggregate.

September 29, 2023
19:30 UTC+8

Stallion Laguna	5–0	Maharlika Manila
Ivanobski 26', 40' (pen.); Nomura 32'; Ford 63'; Doctora 79'

Rizal Memorial Stadium
Referee: Krizmark Nañola
October 9, 2023
19:00 UTC+8

Maharlika Manila	0–4	Stallion Laguna
		Trujillo 15'; Ivanobski 19', 41'; Doctora 83'

Rizal Memorial Stadium
Referee: John Mike Basinang

Stallion Laguna won 9–0 on aggregate.

September 30, 2023
16:00 UTC+8

Dynamic Herb Cebu	2–0	Mendiola 1991
Togashi 30'; Çınkır 81'

Rizal Memorial Stadium
Referee: Mick Jon Pineda
October 9, 2023
16:00 UTC+8

Mendiola 1991	1–4	Dynamic Herb Cebu
Marquez 87'		Hama 20'; Togashi 27'; Çınkır 71', 90'

Rizal Memorial Stadium
Referee: Clifford Daypuyat

Dynamic Herb Cebu won 6–1 on aggregate.

September 30, 2023
19:00 UTC+8

CF Manila	0–1	Davao Aguilas
		Limbo 58'

Rizal Memorial Stadium
Referee: Meliton Pelayo
October 8, 2023
19:00 UTC+8

Davao Aguilas	1–0	CF Manila
Kaole 49'

Rizal Memorial Stadium
Referee: Mick Jon Pineda

Davao Aguilas won 2–0 on aggregate.

== Semi-finals ==
=== Summary ===
Team 1	Agg.	Team 2	1st leg	2nd leg
Kaya–Iloilo	4–2	Stallion Laguna	2–1	2–1
Dynamic Herb Cebu	1–2	Davao Aguilas	0–1	1–1

=== Matches ===
October 21, 2023
16:00 UTC+8

Kaya–Iloilo	2–1	Stallion Laguna
Amita 58'; Baas 62'		Nomura 69'

Rizal Memorial Stadium
Referee: Mick Jon Pineda
November 3, 2023
16:00 UTC+8

Stallion Laguna	1–2	Kaya–Iloilo
Ford 28'		Sendra 18'; Placito 48' (o.g.)

Rizal Memorial Stadium
Referee: Clifford Daypuyat

Kaya–Iloilo won 4–2 on aggregate.

October 21, 2023
19:00 UTC+8

Dynamic Herb Cebu	0–1	Davao Aguilas
		Limbo 37'

Rizal Memorial Stadium
Referee: Meliton Pelayo
November 3, 2023
19:00 UTC+8

Davao Aguilas	1–1	Dynamic Herb Cebu
Bugas 78'		Ouano 90+11'

Rizal Memorial Stadium
Referee: Mick Jon Pineda

Davao Aguilas won 2–1 on aggregate.

== Final ==
December 9, 2023
19:00 UTC+8

Kaya–Iloilo	1–1 (a.e.t.)	Davao Aguilas
Amita 65'		Tuason 45+2'
Penalties
(penalty missed) Lopez Mendy; (penalty scored) Bedic; (penalty scored) Horikoshi; (penalty scored) Menzi; (penalty scored) Baas	4–3	(penalty scored) Bugas; (penalty missed) Tuason; (penalty missed) Kaole; (penalty scored) K. Talaroc; (penalty scored) Limbo

Rizal Memorial Stadium
Attendance: 1,107
Referee: Mick Jon Pineda
