= 2026–27 Philippines Football League =

Philippines Football League
- Season: 2026–27
- Dates: August 31, 2026 – TBA
- Country: Philippines
- Matches: 31
- Goals: 126 (4.06 per match)
- Biggest home win: Aguilas-UMak 10–0 Tuloy (November 8)
- Biggest away win: Tuloy 0–6 Dynamic Herb Cebu (October 18)
- Highest scoring: Aguilas-UMak 10–0 Tuloy (November 8)
- Longest winning run: Manila Digger (6 matches)
- Longest unbeaten run: Manila Digger (6 matches)
- Longest winless run: Philippine Army (6 matches)
- Longest losing run: Philippine Army (6 matches)
- All statistics correct as of 8 November 2026.

The 2026–27 Philippines Football League is the ninth season of the Philippines Football League (PFL), the professional football league of the Philippines.

Ten teams are participating this season, which began on August 31, 2026. The start of the league was postponed by a day due to monsoon rains.

== Teams ==
The 2026–27 season has ten teams participating. Last season's second and eighth place teams, One Taguig and the Don Bosco, will not participate this season. The Azkals Development Club would rejoin the league since 2023.

Team	Location (Note: General location where the club is based in. Only select clubs have their own/designated home stadium.)
Aguilas–UMak	Makati, Metro Manila
Azkals Development Club	Carmona, Cavite
Dynamic Herb Cebu	Talisay, Cebu
Kaya–Iloilo	Iloilo City, Iloilo
Maharlika	Taguig, Metro Manila
Manila Digger	Taguig, Metro Manila
Philippine Army	Taguig, Metro Manila
Stallion Laguna	Biñan, Laguna
Tuloy	Muntinlupa, Metro Manila
Mendiola 1991	Valenzuela, Metro Manila

== Stadiums ==
All games in the first round were held at the Rizal Memorial Stadium in Manila.

2025–26 PFL venue	Manila
2025–26 PFL venue	Rizal Memorial Stadium
2025–26 PFL venue	Capacity: 12,873

== Personnel and kits ==
Team	Head coach	Captain	Kit manufacturer	Sponsors
Aguilas–UMak	(South Korea) Jang Min-suk	(Philippines) Arnel Amita	Primal	2World International^{1}, The Nineteen Studio^{2}, NMN Lifestyle^{4}
Azkals Development Club	(Philippines) Ernani Regis	(Philippines) Stephan Schrock	Azkals Sportswear	E-Tech Asia^{1}, Caldero Kawali^{1}
Dynamic Herb Cebu	(Philippines) Glenn Ramos	(Senegal) Abou Sy	RAD Apparel	Nature's Spring^{1}, Herb Food Solutions^{2}, Prime Rehabilitation^{2}
Kaya–Iloilo	(South Korea) Park Bo-bae	(Philippines) Audie Menzi	LGR Sportswear	LBC^{1}
Maharlika	(South Korea) Moon Hong	(Philippines) Jorrel Aristorenas	Chronos Athletics	M1 International^{1}, 2XU^{2}, Purple Cow^{2}
Manila Digger	(Spain) Joan Esteva	(The Gambia) Modou Joof	UCAN	Zealand Metal^{1}, Prime Rehabilitation^{2}, Starbalm^{2}, Yison^{3}
Mendiola 1991	(Uganda) Dudu Bosco	(Philippines) Nikko Arañas	Ropa	None
Philippine Army	(Philippines) Roel Gener	(Philippines) Jalsor Soriano	Chronos Athletics	Cherry Turf^{2}
Stallion Laguna	(Philippines) Matthew Nierras	(Philippines) Nicolas Ferrer, Jr.	Blaze Athletics	Giligan's Restaurant^{1}, Pythos^{3}
Tuloy	(Japan) Taketomo Suzuki	(Philippines) Harry Nuñez	Skechers	Luenthai ^{1}, Tuloy Foundation^{4}

Notes:

1. Located on the front of the shirt.
2. Located on the back of the shirt.
3. Located on the sleeves.
4. Located on the shorts.

== Regular season ==
=== League table ===
The ten teams will play in a double round robin consisting of 20 games

Pos	Team	Pld	W	D	L	GF	GA	GD	Pts	Qualification
1	Manila Digger	6	6	0	0	17	0	+17	18	Championship round
2	Maharlika	8	4	2	2	15	10	+5	14	Championship round
3	Aguilas–UMak	5	4	1	0	22	3	+19	13	Championship round
4	Kaya–Iloilo	5	3	1	1	12	3	+9	10	Championship round
5	Stallion Laguna	7	3	1	3	16	15	+1	10	Championship round
6	Azkals Development Club	7	2	1	4	6	15	−9	7	Classification round
7	Mendiola 1991	7	2	2	3	10	13	−3	8	Classification round
8	Dynamic Herb Cebu	4	2	0	2	9	3	+6	6	Classification round
9	Tuloy	6	1	0	5	13	34	−21	3	Classification round
10	Philippine Army	6	0	0	6	6	30	−24	0	Classification round

Updated to match(es) played on 8 November 2026. Source: PFF

=== Positions by round ===
Team ╲ Round	1	2	3	4	5	6	7	8	9	10	11	12	13	14	15	16	17	18	19	20
Aguilas–UMak	1	1	3	2	2															
Azkals Development Club	10	10	8	9	8															
Dynamic Herb Cebu	8	7	5	5																
Kaya–Iloilo	4	1	1	3	3															
Maharlika	5	4	4	4	4															
Manila Digger	3	3	2	1	1	1														
Mendiola 1991	5	6	9	7	7															
Philippine Army	7	9	10	10	10															
Stallion Laguna	1	5	6	6																
Tuloy	9	8	7	8	9															

Championship round
Classification round

Updated to match(es) played on 8 November 2026. Source: PFF

=== Results by round ===
Team ╲ Round	1	2	3	4	5	6	7	8	9	10	11	12	13	14	15	16	17	18	19	20
Aguilas–UMak	W	W	D	W	W															
Azkals Development Club	L	L	W	L	D	L	W													
Dynamic Herb Cebu	L	L	W	W																
Kaya–Iloilo	W	W	W	L	D															
Maharlika	D	W	W	L	W	W	D	L												
Manila Digger	W	W	W	W	W	W														
Mendiola 1991	D	L	D	W	L	W														
Philippine Army	L	L	L	L	L	L														
Stallion Laguna	W	L	L	W	D	W	L													
Tuloy	L	L	W	L	L	L	L	L												

Updated to match(es) played on 8 November 2026. Source: PFF
W = Win; D = Draw; L = Loss

=== Results ===
Team	AUM	ADC	DHC	KAY	MAH	MAD	MEN	ARM	STA	TUL
Aguilas–UMak	—		Dec 5	Dec 2		Nov 28		10–0	Nov 22	2–1
Azkals Development Club	0–4	—	Dec 2	1–3	2–0		1–1			
Dynamic Herb Cebu			—							
Kaya–Iloilo				—		0–1		5–0	1–1	
Maharlika	2–2		1–0	Nov 28	—	0–3		5–0		4–2
Manila Digger		2–0	2–0			—	Dec 2	Dec 5		6–0
Mendiola 1991	0–4		0–3	Nov 22	1–1 (Note: Match originally scheduled on Aug 30 but was postponed due to adverse weather conditions.)		—	Nov 29		
Philippine Army		1–2	Nov 22					—	4–2	3–4
Stallion Laguna		4–0	Nov 29		0–2	0–3	2–3		—	
Tuloy		Nov 29	0–6	0–3			2–5		4–5	—

Updated to match(es) played on 15 November 2026. Source: PFF
Legend: Blue = left column team win; Yellow = draw; Red = top row team win.
For upcoming matches, an "a" indicates there is an article about the rivalry between the two participants.

== Season statistics ==
=== Top goalscorers ===
As of 8 November 2026

Rank	Player	Team	Goals
1	(South Korea) Choi Ju-hyuk	Aguilas–UMak	6
2	(Suriname) Zamoranho Ho-A-Tham	Stallion Laguna	5
2	(Japan) Ryuta Iwai	Aguilas–UMak	5
2	(Philippines) Martini Rey	Kaya–Iloilo	5
2	(Philippines) Cyrelle Saut	Tuloy	5
2	(The Gambia) Baboucarr Touray	Manila Digger	5
7	(Philippines) Rico Andes	Manila Digger	4
7	(Japan) Ren Nagamatsu	Maharlika	4
7	(Nigeria) Onyeka Obi	Mendiola 1991	4
10	(Philippines) Lucas del Rosario	Aguilas–UMak	3
10	(Philippines) John Lloyd Jalique	Tuloy	3

=== Top assists ===
As of 8 November 2026

Rank	Player	Team	Assists
1	(Ghana) Edmond Appiah	Aguilas–UMak	5
2	(Philippines) John Lloyd Jalique	Tuloy	4
2	(South Korea) Kim Sung-jin	Kaya–Iloilo	4
2	(Afghanistan) Omid Musawi	Stallion Laguna	4
5	(Philippines) Arnel Amita	Aguilas–UMak	3
5	(Trinidad and Tobago) Michael Kedman	Maharlika	3
5	(Philippines) Harry Nuñez	Tuloy	3
5	(The Gambia) Baboucarr Touray	Manila Digger	3
9	14 players		2

=== Own goals ===
As of 8 November 2026

Rank	Player	Team	Own goals
1	(Philippines) Charles Pickering	Stallion Laguna	1

=== Hat-tricks ===
As of 8 November 2026

Player	Teami	Result	Against	Date
(Suriname) Zamoranho Ho-A-Tham^{4}	Stallion Laguna	4–2 (A)	Philippine Army	25 October 2026
(South Korea) Choi Ju-hyuk^{4}	Aguilas–UMak	10–0 (H)	Philippine Army	8 November 2026

Note

(H) – Home; (A) – Away
^{4} Player scored four goals
^{5} Player scored five goals

=== Clean sheets ===
As of 8 November 2026

Rank	Player	Team	Clean sheets
1	(The Gambia) Omar Njie	Manila Digger	5
2	(United States) Adam Braman	Maharlika	3
3	(Philippines) Patrick Deyto	Kaya–Iloilo	2
3	(South Korea) Jang Tae-yang	Aguilas–UMak	2
3	(South Korea) Kim Yu-sung	Aguilas–UMak	2
3	(Japan) Timothy Shiraoka	Dynamic Herb Cebu	2
7	(Philippines) Michael Asong	Manila Digger	1
7	(Philippines) Mark Bedia	Philippine Army	1
7	(United States) Maxson Dunphy	Mendiola 1991	1
7	(Philippines) Nelson Gasic	Stallion Laguna	1
7	(United States) Roberto Llamas	Stallion Laguna	1
7	(Philippines) Enrico Mangaoang	Aguilas–UMak	1
7	(Philippines) Hayeson Pepito	ADC	1

=== Discipline ===
As of 8 November 2026

==== Player ====
- Most yellow cards: 3
  - (Philippines) Arnel Amita (Aguilas–UMak)
  - (Japan) Ryuta Iwai (Aguilas–UMak)
  - (Morocco) Abdelhamid Lachhab (ADC)
  - (Philippines) MJ Libre (ADC)
  - (Philippines) Kier Napolitano (Philippine Army)
- Most red cards: 1
  - (United States) Max Brown (Stallion Laguna)
  - (Philippines) Jan Delariarte (Philippine Army)
  - (Philippines) Jayvee Kallukaran (Aguilas–UMak)
  - (Philippines) Caelan McLeod (Stallion Laguna)
  - (Philippines) Charles Pickering (Stallion Laguna)
  - (Philippines) Jalsor Soriano (Philippine Army)
  - (Senegal) Abou Sy (Dynamic Herb Cebu)

==== Club ====
- Most yellow cards: 18
  - ADC
- Fewest yellow cards: 4
  - Dynamic Herb Cebu
- Most red cards: 3
  - Stallion Laguna
- Fewest red cards: 0
  - 6 teams
