= 2023 Copa Paulino Alcantara =

5th season of the Copa Paulino Alcantara

Tournament details
- Country: Philippines
- Dates: July 15 – December 9
- Teams: 17

Final positions
- Champions: Kaya–Iloilo (3rd title)

Tournament statistics
- Matches played: 53
- Goals scored: 226 (4.26 per match)
- Top goal scorer(s): Abou Sy (10 goals)

The 2023 Copa Paulino Alcantara was the fifth edition of the Copa Paulino Alcantara, the domestic football cup competition of the Philippines. The 2023 edition marks the second time that the cup includes non-PFL teams, with the first being the inclusion of the Philippines U22 as a guest team in 2019.

== Scheduling ==
The league is set to begin on July 15, 2023. Prior to 2023, the typical schedule would see the Copa being played after the conclusion of that year's Philippines Football League season, with the league shifting to an inter-year format.

On June 17, the PFL confirmed the venues for the competition, namely Rizal Memorial Stadium in Manila, University of Makati Stadium in Makati, and Biñan Football Stadium in Biñan, Laguna, marking the competition's first time to do so since the 2019 edition, as the other two were primarily held in the PFF National Training Center due to the COVID-19 pandemic.

== Participating teams ==
Seventeen teams entered the 2023 Copa Paulino Alcantara. All seven clubs of the ongoing Philippines Football League were expected to participate. Before the resumption of the PFL season, United City withdrew from the season in February 2023. The Azkals Development Team also withdrew prior to the end of the season.

Philippines Football League; 5 teams from the 2022–23 season	Former PFL teams 3 teams	University Athletic Association of the Philippines; 3 teams	Other guest teams 6 teams
Dynamic Herb Cebu; Kaya–Iloilo; Maharlika Manila; Mendiola 1991; Stallion Laguna	Davao Aguilas; Loyola; Philippine Air Force	Adamson University; Far Eastern University; University of the Philippines	Don Bosco Garelli; CF Manila; Manila Digger; Philippine Army; Pilipinas Dragons; Tuloy

== Format ==
=== Competition ===
The PFL confirmed the participation of 17 teams just before the draw on June 17, 2023, the most in the competition's history. The 17 teams would be split into three groups (two groups of six and one group of five) with clubs from three pots. The format of the group stage would see teams play a single round robin just as in previous editions, before the group winners and runners-up, as well as the two best third-placers, qualify for the knockout stage.

The knockout stage of the 2023 edition comprises the quarterfinals, semifinals, and finals. The quarterfinals and semifinals would be two-legged, marking a difference from the previous editions, while the final would be held over a single match. The league had also established beforehand which teams would play each other based on the positions they finished in, eliminating the need for a knockout stage draw. The quarterfinals would see 1st place in group A taking on the 2nd-best third-placed team, the 1st place of group B taking on the best third-placed team, 1st place in group C taking on 2nd place of group B, and the 2nd-placed teams in group A and C facing off.

=== Draw ===
The group stage draw took place on June 17, 2023, with 17 teams confirmed to be competing from the 20-team shortlist. The 5 teams from the Philippines Football League were pre-allocated slots in the three groups, while the other 12 teams were separated into three pots. Pot 1 contained the amateur teams, including youth teams Tuloy and Don Bosco Garelli, former PFL club Loyola (then known as Meralco Manila), 7's Football League clubs Manila Digger and Pilipinas Dragons, as well as newly established Inter Manila (renamed CF Manila after the draw). Pot 2 contained teams from the University Athletic Association of the Philippines, with only three - Adamson University, Far Eastern University, and University of the Philippines - comprising the final participants. Pot 3 contained the teams from the Armed Forces of the Philippines, with former PFL club and UFL champions Philippine Air Force and once-UFL third placers Philippine Army competing. The pots are shown below:

Bye (seeded teams)	Pot 1	Pot 2	Pot 3
Dynamic Herb Cebu; Kaya–Iloilo; Maharlika Manila; Mendiola 1991; Stallion Laguna	Davao Aguilas; Don Bosco Garelli; Inter Manila (Note: Renamed CF Manila after the draw); Loyola; Manila Digger; Pilipinas Dragons; Tuloy	Adamson University; Far Eastern University; University of the Philippines	Philippine Air Force; Philippine Army

== Group stage ==
Key to colours in group tables
Advancing to the knockout stage
Possible knockout stage

=== Group A ===
Pos	Team	Pld	W	D	L	GF	GA	GD	Pts	Qualification	KAY	CFM	PAF	FEU	LOY	GAR
1	Kaya–Iloilo	5	5	0	0	40	2	+38	15	Quarter-finals	—	8–0	9–1	—	—	11–0
2	CF Manila	5	3	1	1	9	12	−3	10	Quarter-finals	—	—	3–1	—	—	3–2
3	Philippine Air Force	5	2	1	2	8	14	−6	7		—	—	—	2–2	3–0	—
4	Far Eastern University	5	1	3	1	10	10	0	6		1–5	1–1	—	—	—	4–0
5	Loyola	5	1	1	3	8	15	−7	4		0–7	0–2	—	2–2	—	—
6	Don Bosco Garelli	5	0	0	5	3	25	−22	0		—	—	0–1	—	1–6	—

July 15, 2023 1	Don Bosco Garelli	0–1	Philippine Air Force	Manila
16:00 UTC+8			Poderoso 46'	Stadium: Rizal Memorial Stadium; Referee: Mick Jon Pineda

July 16, 2023 2	Loyola	0–2	CF Manila	Manila
18:30 UTC+8			Umilin 75'; Panotes 82'	Stadium: Rizal Memorial Stadium; Referee: Meliton Pelayo

July 22, 2023 3	Loyola	2–2	Far Eastern University	Manila
18:30 UTC+8	Montelibano 58'; Baña 63'		Ae 27' (o.g.); Rey 44'	Stadium: Rizal Memorial Stadium; Referee: John Mike Basinang

July 23, 2023 4	CF Manila	3–2	Don Bosco Garelli	Manila
16:00 UTC+8	Almohjili 10' (pen.); Locsin 34'; Ali 41'		Bedia 13'; Dela Cruz 82'	Stadium: Rizal Memorial Stadium; Referee: Krizmark Nanola

July 31, 2023 5	Philippine Air Force	3–0	Loyola	Manila
17:00 UTC+8	Ja. Delariarte 21'; Je. Delariarte 28', 90+5'			Stadium: Rizal Memorial Stadium; Referee: John Mike Basinang

August 5, 2023 6	Don Bosco Garelli	1–6	Loyola	Manila
16:00 UTC+8	Mahinay 28'		Baña 13'; Montelibano 29', 60', 75' (pen.); Anoh 82', 89'	Stadium: Rizal Memorial Stadium; Referee: Clifford Daypuyat

August 6, 2023 7	CF Manila	3–1	Philippine Air Force	Manila
18:30 UTC+8	Almohjili 35' (pen.); Grogg 88', 90+3'		Albor 9'	Stadium: Rizal Memorial Stadium; Referee: Mick Jon Pineda

August 9, 2023 8	Far Eastern University	1–1	CF Manila	Manila
20:00 UTC+8	Basindahan 1'		Alon 90+5'	Stadium: Rizal Memorial Stadium

August 12, 2023 9	Loyola	0–7	Kaya–Iloilo	Manila
18:30 UTC+8			Sendra 11'; Arboleda 31', 42'; Baas 33', 50'; Sy 58'; Swainston 89'	Stadium: Rizal Memorial Stadium; Referee: Michael Barajas

August 13, 2023 10	Far Eastern University	4–0	Don Bosco Garelli	Manila
20:00 UTC+8	Rey 34', 56'; Mamon 75', 83'			Stadium: Rizal Memorial Stadium

August 19, 2023 11	Kaya–Iloilo	11–0	Don Bosco Garelli	Manila
16:00 UTC+8	Sendra 9', 46'; Amita 10'; Melliza 15'; Angeles 47', 73', 79'; Sy 62', 65'; Horikoshi 67', 80'			Stadium: Rizal Memorial Stadium; Referee: Mick Jon Pineda

August 26, 2023 12	Kaya–Iloilo	9–1	Philippine Air Force	Manila
17:30 UTC+8	Horikoshi 16', 23'; Sy 30', 32'; Amita 40'; Sendra 43'; Baas 48'; Gayoso 50', 75'		Ja. Delariarte 85'	Stadium: Rizal Memorial Stadium; Referee: Rodney Leyble

September 2, 2023 13	Philippine Air Force	2–2	Far Eastern University	Manila
16:00 UTC+8	Ja. Delariarte 85' (pen.), 90+2'		Basindanan 5'; Pescadera 60'	Stadium: Rizal Memorial Stadium

September 3, 2023 14	Kaya–Iloilo	8–0	CF Manila	Manila
18:30 UTC+8	Sendra 12'; Gayoso 44'; Horikoshi 45+1', 55'; Amita 56', 88'; Sy 83'; Baas 89'			Stadium: Rizal Memorial Stadium; Referee: Mick Jon Pineda

September 23, 2023 15	Far Eastern University	1–5	Kaya–Iloilo	Manila
16:00 UTC+8	Mamon 45+3'		Diano 5'; Bedic 12'; Melliza 14'; Sy 74', 77'	Stadium: Rizal Memorial Stadium

=== Group B ===
Pos	Team	Pld	W	D	L	GF	GA	GD	Pts	Qualification	CEB	MAH	UPH	DRA	DIG
1	Dynamic Herb Cebu	4	4	0	0	16	3	+13	12	Quarter-finals	—	2–1	2–0	—	—
2	Maharlika Manila	4	2	1	1	5	3	+2	7	Quarter-finals	—	—	1–0	—	1–1
3	University of the Philippines	4	2	0	2	6	5	+1	6	Quarter-finals	—	—	—	2–1	4–1
4	Pilipinas Dragons	4	1	0	3	3	12	−9	3		1–8	0–2	—	—	—
5	Manila Digger	4	0	1	3	3	10	−7	1		1–4	—	—	0–1	—

July 22, 2023 1	University of the Philippines	4–1	Manila Digger	Manila
18:30 UTC+8	Fornis 4'; Galsim 37'; Tidor 82'; Tacardon 85' (pen.)		Cauyong 45+1' (pen.)	Stadium: Rizal Memorial Stadium; Referee: Michael Barajas

August 6, 2023 2	Manila Digger	0–1	Pilipinas Dragons	Manila
16:00 UTC+8			Gonzales 21'	Stadium: Rizal Memorial Stadium; Referee: John Mike Basinang

August 9, 2023 3	University of the Philippines	2–1	Pilipinas Dragons	Manila
17:00 UTC+8	Bation 31'; Tobias 90+1'		Caraig 25'	Stadium: Rizal Memorial Stadium; Referee: Mick Jon Pineda

August 12, 2023 4	Maharlika Manila	1–1	Manila Digger	Manila
16:00 UTC+8	Ndour 62'		Azares 39'	Stadium: Rizal Memorial Stadium; Referee: Samuel Mendoza

August 20, 2023 5	Dynamic Herb Cebu	2–0	University of the Philippines	Talisay
15:00 UTC+8	Uzoka 4', 71'			Stadium: Dynamic Herb Sports Complex; Referee: Lindon Talaver

August 20, 2023 6	Pilipinas Dragons	0–2	Maharlika Manila	Manila
17:00 UTC+8			John 21'; Ndour 46'	Stadium: Rizal Memorial Stadium

August 27, 2023 7	Manila Digger	1–4	Dynamic Herb Cebu	Manila
16:00 UTC+8	Stuart 90+4'		Çınkır 14'; Hama 61'; Miyagi 90+2'; Demiroğlu 90+6'	Stadium: Rizal Memorial Stadium; Referee: John Mike Basinang

August 27, 2023 8	Maharlika Manila	1–0	University of the Philippines	Manila
18:30 UTC+8	Ndour 90+4'			Stadium: Rizal Memorial Stadium; Referee: Clifford Daypuyat

September 3, 2023 9	Pilipinas Dragons	1–8	Dynamic Herb Cebu	Manila
16:00 UTC+8	Milo 12'		Ouano 27', 37'; Hama 30', 83'; Uzoka 32', 50'; Togashi 34'; Çınkır 58'	Stadium: Rizal Memorial Stadium; Referee: Clifford Daypuyat

September 9, 2023 10	Dynamic Herb Cebu	2–1	Maharlika Manila	Manila
18:30 UTC+8	Uzoka 3'; Çınkır 16'		Canicosa 53'	Stadium: Rizal Memorial Stadium; Referee: Meliton Pelayo

=== Group C ===
Pos	Team	Pld	W	D	L	GF	GA	GD	Pts	Qualification	STA	DAV	MEN	TLY	PAR	ADU
1	Stallion Laguna	5	4	0	1	28	4	+24	12	Quarter-finals	—	—	0–1	9–1	6–1	—
2	Davao Aguilas	5	3	1	1	14	10	+4	10	Quarter-finals	0–4	—	3–3	—	—	2–0
3	Mendiola 1991	5	2	3	0	10	8	+2	9	Quarter-finals	—	—	—	4–4	1–0	—
4	Tuloy	5	2	1	2	11	20	−9	7		—	0–5	—	—	3–2	—
5	Philippine Army	5	1	0	4	9	15	−6	3		—	3–4	—	—	—	3–1
6	Adamson University	5	0	1	4	3	18	−15	1		1–9	—	1–1	0–3	—	—

July 15, 2023 1	Tuloy	3–2	Philippine Army	Manila
18:30 UTC+8	Sajor 14', 47'; Demate 88'		Ariola 22', 26'	Stadium: Rizal Memorial Stadium; Referee: Krizmark Nañola

July 16, 2023 2	Davao Aguilas	2–0	Adamson University	Manila
16:00 UTC+8	Kaole 58'; Cielo 73'			Stadium: Rizal Memorial Stadium; Referee: Mick Jon Pineda

July 23, 2023 3	Tuloy	0–5	Davao Aguilas	Manila
18:30 UTC+8			K. Talaroc 40' (pen.); Tuason 42', 63'; Limbo 65'; Dalapo 90+4'	Stadium: Rizal Memorial Stadium

July 29, 2023 4	Philippine Army	3–4	Davao Aguilas	Makati
15:00 UTC+8	Simpron 37', 62' (pen.); Celiz 90+2'		Kaole 17', 28'; Limbo 53'; Tuason 58'	Stadium: University of Makati Stadium; Referee: Krizmark Nañola

July 29, 2023 5	Adamson University	0–3	Tuloy	Manila
17:15 UTC+8			Jalique 2'; Nuñez 12' (pen.); Demate 83'	Stadium: Rizal Memorial Stadium; Referee: Meliton Pelayo

August 5, 2023 6	Philippine Army	3–1	Adamson University	Manila
18:30 UTC+8	Ariola 7'; Gatinao 26'; Becite 58'		Francisco 36'	Stadium: Rizal Memorial Stadium; Referee: Samuel Mendoza

August 12, 2023 7	Davao Aguilas	3–3	Mendiola 1991	Manila
20:00 UTC+8	Tuason 27', 77'; Angeles 90+4'		Abalos 17'; Rozal 35'; Rasonable 84'	Stadium: Rizal Memorial Stadium; Referee: Clifford Daypuyat

August 13, 2023 8	Stallion Laguna	6–1	Philippine Army	Manila
16:00 UTC+8	McDaniel 5', 57', 88'; Trujillo 15', 31'; Schaffner 77'		Ariola 65'	Stadium: Rizal Memorial Stadium; Referee: Mick Jon Pineda

August 19, 2023 9	Adamson University	1–1	Mendiola 1991	Makati
18:00 UTC+8	Buenaobra 85'		Ngong Sam 88' (pen.)	Stadium: University of Makati Stadium; Referee: Meliton Pelayo

August 26, 2023 10	Mendiola 1991	1–0	Philippine Army	Manila
15:00 UTC+8	Sison 77'			Stadium: Rizal Memorial Stadium; Referee: Mick Jon Pineda

August 26, 2023 11	Davao Aguilas	0–4	Stallion Laguna	Makati
20:00 UTC+8			Nomura 7', 29', 74'; Placito 90+4'	Stadium: University of Makati Stadium

August 30, 2023 10	Stallion Laguna	9–1	Tuloy	Manila
16:00 UTC+8	McDaniel 24'; Felongco 26'; Placito 29', 79'; Aristorenas 43'; Ivanobski 49'; Nakamura 63', 88'; Pickering 82'		Jalique 16'	Stadium: Rizal Memorial Stadium; Referee: Meliton Pelayo

September 2, 2023 13	Mendiola 1991	4–4	Tuloy	Manila
16:00 UTC+8	Escosora 29'; Ngong Sam 38'; Hajimehdi 73' (pen.), 90' (pen.)		Jalique 4', 54', 80'; Grizola 8'	Stadium: Rizal Memorial Stadium; Attendance: John Mike Basinang

September 9, 2023 14	Stallion Laguna	0–1	Mendiola 1991	Manila
18:30 UTC+8			Jarvis 82' (o.g.)	Stadium: Rizal Memorial Stadium; Referee: John Mike Basinang

September 24, 2023 15	Adamson University	1–9	Stallion Laguna	Biñan
16:00 UTC+8	Villanueva 50'		Nomura 8', 20', 39'; McDaniel 27', 47'; Doctora 57'; Felongco 64'; Nakamura 72'; Bedia 90'	Stadium: Biñan Football Stadium

=== Ranking of third-placed teams ===
The two best third-placed teams from the three groups advance to the knockout stage along with the three group winners and runners-up. Due to Group B only having 5 teams, results against the last-placed team in Groups A and C will not be counted when determining the ranking of runners-up.

Pos	Team	Pld	W	D	L	GF	GA	GD	Pts	Qualification
1	Mendiola 1991	4	2	2	0	9	7	+2	8	Advance to Quarter-finals
2	University of the Philippines	4	2	0	2	6	5	+1	6	Advance to Quarter-finals
3	Philippine Air Force	4	1	1	2	7	14	−7	4	

== Knockout stage ==
The teams that qualify for the knock-out stage are allocated a spot based on their position within the group and as a third placer, as determined by the draw on June 17. A third place match was supposed to be held on the same day as the final, but was later cancelled due to scheduling conflicts.

Quarter-finals
Kaya–Iloilo	3	8	11
UP	0	0	0
Stallion Laguna	5	4	9
Maharlika Manila	0	0	0
Dynamic Herb Cebu	2	4	6
Mendiola 1991	0	1	1
CF Manila	0	0	0
Davao Aguilas	1	1	2

Semi-finals
Kaya–Iloilo	2	2	4
Stallion Laguna	1	1	2
Dynamic Herb Cebu	0	1	1
Davao Aguilas	1	1	2

Final
Kaya–Iloilo	1(4)
Davao Aguilas	1(3)

=== Quarter-finals ===
The first quarter-final legs were played on September 29 and 30, with the second legs played on October 8 and 9.

Team 1	Agg.	Team 2	1st leg	2nd leg
Kaya–Iloilo	11–0	University of the Philippines	3–0	8–0
Stallion Laguna	9–0	Maharlika Manila	5–0	4–0
Dynamic Herb Cebu	6–1	Mendiola 1991	2–0	4–1
CF Manila	0–2	Davao Aguilas	0–1	0–1

=== Semi-finals ===
The first semi-final legs were played on October 19 while the second legs were played on November 3.

Team 1	Agg.	Team 2	1st leg	2nd leg
Kaya–Iloilo	4–2	Stallion Laguna	2–1	2–1
Dynamic Herb Cebu	1–2	Davao Aguilas	0–1	1–1

=== Final ===
The 2023 final was played on 9 December at Rizal Memorial Stadium, the site of the 2018 final.

December 9, 2023
19:00 UTC+8

Kaya–Iloilo	1–1 (a.e.t.)	Davao Aguilas
Amita 65'		Tuason 45+2'
Penalties
(penalty missed) Lopez Mendy; (penalty scored) Bedic; (penalty scored) Horikoshi; (penalty scored) Menzi; (penalty scored) Baas	4–3	(penalty scored) Bugas; (penalty missed) Tuason; (penalty missed) Kaole; (penalty scored) K. Talaroc; (penalty scored) Limbo

Rizal Memorial Stadium
Attendance: 1,107
Referee: Mick Jon Pineda

== Top scorers ==
Team eliminated / inactive for this round.

Rank	Player	Team	MD1	MD2	MD3	MD4	MD5	QF1	QF2	SF1	SF2	F	Total
1	(Senegal) Abou Sy	Kaya–Iloilo	1	2	2	1	2		2				10
2	(Japan) Yuta Nomura	Stallion Laguna		3			3	1		1			8
3	(Philippines) Arnel Amita	Kaya–Iloilo		1	1	2				1		1	6
3	(Philippines) Justin Baas	Kaya–Iloilo	2		1	1			1	1			6
3	(Turkey) Arda Çınkır	Dynamic Herb Cebu		1	1	1		1	2				6
3	(Japan) Daizo Horikoshi	Kaya–Iloilo		2	2	2							6
3	(Philippines) Griffin McDaniel	Stallion Laguna	3		1		2						6
3	(Argentina) Ricardo Sendra	Kaya–Iloilo	1	2	1	1					1		6
3	(Philippines) Yannick Tuason	Davao Aguilas		2	1	2						1	6
10	(Philippines) Jarvey Gayoso	Kaya–Iloilo			2	1		2					5
10	(Argentina) Cristian Ivanobski	Stallion Laguna			1			2	2				5
10	(Philippines) John Lloyd Jalique	Tuloy			1	1	3						5
10	(Philippines) Chima Uzoka	Dynamic Herb Cebu	2		2	1							5

== Awards ==
Award	Winner	Club
Golden Ball	(Japan) Daizo Horikoshi	Kaya–Iloilo
Golden Boot	(Senegal) Abou Sy	Kaya–Iloilo
Golden Glove	(Philippines) Quincy Kammeraad	Kaya–Iloilo
Best Defender	(Philippines) Simone Rota	Kaya–Iloilo
Best Midfielder	(Philippines) Paolo Bugas	Davao Aguilas
