= 2022 Azkals Development Team season =

Azkals Development Team
2022–23 season
- Owner: Philippine Football Federation
- Head coach: Norman Fegidero
- Philippines Football League: Withdrew
- Copa Paulino Alcantara: Withdrew
- All statistics correct as of March 20, 2022.

The 2022 season is the Azkals Development Team's 2nd season in both the Philippines Football League and Copa Paulino Alcantara, and it was during the 2021 Copa Paulino Alcantara where the club reached its best ever finish, losing to Kaya in the final. Most of the members of the ADT are also competing in the 2022 AFF U-23 Championship and the 2021 Southeast Asian Games.

The 2022 season marked the first time many of the club's players were let go by the club in order to play with other clubs in the Philippines Football League and abroad, which was the original goal when the club was formed. There was a lot of change within the Azkals' management and coaching staff, with previous coach Giovanni Villagracia leaving his post as head coach and being replaced by Norman Fegidero, who would be in charge of the team for all competitions this year, both local and international. Stewart Hall, who had last been involved with the team in the AFF U-23 Championship, was also named the PFF's technical director. Dynamic Herb Cebu's coach Oliver Colina also left the club to pursue an assistant coaching role within the ADT. Christian Rontini became the first player of the ADT to move abroad as he secured a move to Penang in Malaysia, while Mar Diano, Jarvey Gayoso, Oskari Kekkonen, and Sandro Reyes signed for Kaya–Iloilo. Ivan Ouano, Pete Forrosuelo, and Mathew Custodio were signed by United City, and Troy Limbo and Kainoa Bailey signed for Stallion Laguna. The club signed three players on loan in order to strengthen the squad as well as build chemistry before the SEA Games, namely Charles Pickering and Jayvee Kallukaran from Stallion Laguna, and Jaime Rosquillo from Dynamic Herb Cebu.
