= Azkals 7s =

Azkals
- Full name: Philippine Azkals
- Founded: 2024
- General manager: Patrick Ace Bright
- Head coach: Hamed Hajimehdi
- League: 7's Football League
- 2024: 2nd, Asia 7s
First colors	Second colors

The Azkals are a seven-a-side football team in the Philippines.

== History ==
The Philippine national eleven-a-side football team was known after the moniker, the Azkals or the street dogs in Filipino as a reference to the team's mixed-heritage lineage and its perceived lackluster reception. The moniker was officially in use until 2023 when team manager Dan Palami left the national team staff.

With consent from the Philippine Football Federation, the Azkals name was adopted by an independent 7-a-side club launched in August 2024. It is led by Palami and former national team players.

They had an exhibition game against personalities from the Philippine entertainment industry in the Azkals Celebrity Cup. The Azkals made their competitive debut at the 2024 Asia 7s Championship in Malaysia. They finished as runners-up losing 1–2 to Japan Football 7 Society Association's team.

== Honors ==
- Asia 7s Championship:
  - Second place: 2024

== Notable players ==
2024 Asia 7s

- Andres Aldeguer (U23 player)
- Arnel Amita
- Misagh Bahadoran
- Kenry Balobo (U23 player)
- Yrick Gallantes
- Patrick Grogg (U23 player)
- Mark Hartmann
- Ivan Ouano (U23 player)
- Daisuke Sato
- Stephan Schröck
