= Patrick Grogg =

Filipino footballer

Personal information
- Full name: Patrick Russel Navarro Grogg
- Date of birth: November 27, 2002 (age 23)
- Place of birth: Angeles City, Philippines
- Height: 1.72 m (5 ft 8 in)
- Position: Winger

Team information
- Current team: Davao Aguilas
- Number: 6

Youth career
- Bangkok F.C.
- Ceres
- –2020: Westfields International School

Senior career*
Years	Team	Apps	(Gls)
2020–2022	FC Küttigen		(17)
2022–2023	FC Rothrist		
2023	ADT	4	(1)
2023–2024	CF Manila	2	(2)
2024–	One Taguig	12	(4)

International career^{‡}
2023–	Philippines U23	4	(0)
- * Club domestic league appearances and goals as of 7:55, July 27, 2024 (UTC) ‡ National team caps and goals as of 7:55, July 27, 2024 (UTC)

Patrick Russel Navarro Grogg (born 27 November 2002) is a Filipino professional footballer who plays as a winger for Philippines Football League club One Taguig and the Philippines U23 national team.

== Personal life ==
Grogg was born in Angeles City in the province of Pampanga to a Filipino mother and Swiss father. In his youth, he played for the youth team of Thai club Bangkok F.C. from the under-7 to the under-15 level, also playing for the youth team of the club then known as Ceres–Negros up until the under-19 level. He also played high school football for Westfields International School in Pampanga, whose team he co-captained.

== Club career ==
=== Switzerland ===
Grogg moved to his father's country of Switzerland after graduating to play for lower league Swiss teams. He first signed for FC Küttigen, where he tallied 17 goals by October 2020. He stayed with Kúttigen for another season, before transferring to FC Rothrist in August 2022.

=== Azkals Development Team ===
As part of the preparation of the Philippine U23 national team for the 2023 SEA Games, Grogg returned to the Philippines in early 2023 to play for the Azkals Development Team of the Philippines Football League. He came off the bench in a game against Maharlika Manila and tallied 1 goal and 1 assist, though he didn't make the SEA Games squad. After his stint with the ADT was cut short when the team abruptly withdrew from the league in May, he joined CF Manila, a team composed mainly of members of the Azkals Development Academy, for the 2023 Copa Paulino Alcantara. He scored two goals on his debut against Philippine Air Force including a match winner, as well as providing a crucial assist for a late equalizer against the Far Eastern University Tamaraws.

=== One Taguig ===
After his spell with CF Manila, Grogg signed with One Taguig of the Philippines Football League, a new team entering the PFL for the 2024 season. He made his debut off the bench in the opening matchday against Manila Montet but became a starter for the team, scoring in the game to make it 3–1 as well as goals against Philippine Air Force and Stallion Laguna.

== International career ==
=== Philippines U23 ===
Although he didn't make the Philippines' squad for the SEA Games, he was called up for the first time to the U23 team for the 2023 AFF U23 Championship. He made his debut in a 2–2 draw with Laos, coming on in the 62nd minute for Harry Nuñez. He was called up to the team once more for the qualifiers of the 2024 AFC U-23 Asian Cup.

=== Philippines ===
His performances with One Taguig in the PFL were also watched closely by Philippine National Team coach Tom Saintfiet. He was called up in July after the league's conclusion for the team's locally based training camp for the Merdeka Cup.
