= Santino Rosales =

Filipino footballer (born 2000)

Personal information
- Full name: Santino Gabriel Palomares Rosales
- Date of birth: 11 December 2000 (age 25)
- Place of birth: Makati, Philippines
- Height: 1.86 m (6 ft 1 in)
- Position: Centre-back

Team information
- Current team: Maharlika
- Number: 4

Youth career
- 2014–2017: Kaya
- 2018–2019: Global
- 2021: Pilipinas Dragons
- 2022–2023: Davao Aguilas

College career
Years	Team	Apps	(Gls)
2019–2023	De La Salle University		

Senior career*
Years	Team	Apps	(Gls)
2023–2024	Davao Aguilas	3	(0)
2024–	Maharlika	6	(0)
- * Club domestic league appearances and goals as of 03:27, 17 August 2025 (UTC) ‡ National team caps and goals as of 03:27, 17 August 2025 (UTC)

Santino Gabriel Palomares Rosales (born 11 December 2000) is a Filipino professional football player and model. He currently plays as a centre-back for Maharlika of the Philippines Football League.

== Personal life ==
Rosales was born in Makati to actor Jericho Rosales and model Kai Palomares. He spent his high school years in Colegio San Agustin – Makati, where he also played football.

In his teenage years, Rosales also took up modeling, In 2020, he signed for Viva Artists Agency.

== Career ==
=== Youth career ===
Rosales played youth football for a number of clubs, first playing with the youth team of Kaya in 2014 as well as for his high school. He would also play for Global and UMak-based Davao Aguilas, as well as Pilipinas Dragons. From 2019 to 2023, he also played college football for the De La Salle Archers.

=== Davao Aguilas ===
In 2023, Rosales made the jump from Davao's youth team to their senior team, first playing for the club in the 2023 Copa Paulino Alcantara. There, the club upset Dynamic Herb Cebu to reach the finals, where they lost to Kaya–Iloilo on penalties.

In 2024, Rosales was retained by Davao for the shortened 2024 PFL season, the club's first in the top flight since 2018. He made 2 appearances in 14 games.

=== Maharlika ===
Before the start of the 2024–25 PFL season, Rosales left Davao and signed with Maharlika Taguig. Over the course of the season he made 6 appearances at center-back, and was retained by the club for another year.
