= John Lloyd Jalique =

Filipino footballer

Personal information
- Full name: John Lloyd Odtojan Jalique
- Date of birth: February 4, 2004 (age 22)
- Place of birth: Philippines
- Position: Forward

Team information
- Current team: Tuloy
- Number: 17

Youth career
- Tuloy Foundation

Senior career*
Years	Team	Apps	(Gls)
2022–2023	Azkals Development Team	7	(0)
2023–	Tuloy	7	(9)

International career^{‡}
2019	Philippines U16	3	(3)
2022	Philippines U19	2	(0)
2023–	Philippines U23	5	(0)
- * Club domestic league appearances and goals as of 3:58, April 20, 2024 (UTC) ‡ National team caps and goals as of 3:58, April 20, 2024 (UTC)

John Lloyd Odtojan Jalique (born 4 February 2004) is a Filipino professional footballer who plays as a forward for Tuloy of the Philippines Football League and the Philippines national under-23 team.

== Personal life ==
Jalique was born in Bacoor, Cavite. As a street child, he was taken up by the Tuloy sa Don Bosco Foundation under Father Rocky Evangelista and would take part in the school's football program.

== Club career ==
=== Azkals Development Team ===
In 2022, Jalique, alongside four other boys from Tuloy, signed for the Azkals Development Team of the Philippines Football League, a club aimed at cultivating young Filipino footballers. He made seven appearances before the club suddenly withdrew from the league in early 2023.

=== Tuloy FC ===
After the ADT, Jalique would return to Tuloy as the club participated in the 2023 Copa Paulino Alcantara, scoring 5 goals in 5 matches. In 2024, the club would participate in the PFL for the first time. Leading the line for Tuloy, he scored four goals in his first two games.

== International career ==
=== Philippines U16 ===
Jalique was first called up to the Philippine U16 team for the 2019 AFF U15 Championship. After getting called up again for the 2020 AFC U16 Championship qualifiers, he scored his first-ever hat trick against the Northern Mariana Islands, though the Philippines narrowly missed out on qualification.

=== Philippines U19 ===
Jalique was called up again to the Philippine U19 National Team to participate in the 2022 AFF U19 Championship. He made his debut against Thailand, coming on for Andres Aldeguer.

=== Philippines U23 ===
In August 2023, he was called up to the Philippines U23 National Team to participate in the 2023 AFF U-23 Championship, making his debut off the bench in a 2–2 draw with Laos. He was subsequently called up to the team again in the AFC U23 Asian Cup Qualifiers.
