= Harry Nuñez =

Filipino footballer

Personal information
- Full name: Harry James Pracullos Nuñez
- Date of birth: December 16, 2004 (age 21)
- Place of birth: Philippines
- Position: Midfielder

Youth career
- Tuloy Foundation

Senior career*
Years	Team	Apps	(Gls)
2022–2023	Azkals Development Team	11	(1)
2023–2024	Tuloy	16	(2)
2024	→ PFF Developmental Team (loan)		

International career
2019	Philippines U15	6	(1)
2022–	Philippines U19	4	(0)
2023–	Philippines U23	7	(0)
2022–	Philippines	2	(0)
- * Club domestic league appearances and goals

Harry James Pracullos "Noti" Nuñez (born 16 December 2004) is a Filipino professional footballer who plays as a midfielder for the Philippines national team. He has also represented the various youth teams of the country.

== Early life ==
Nuñez is a former street child living in Muntinlupa. He would start playing football at age 6 upon the encouragement of Catholic priest Rocky Evangelista of the Tuloy sa Don Bosco Foundation. He would be admitted as a resident at the foundation at age 12.

== Club career ==
=== Tuloy FC ===
Nuñez was under and played football for the Tuloy sa Don Bosco Foundation in Muntinlupa, which helped street kids in the area pursue an education. Nuñez, along with several others, took part in the school's futsal and football program. Several of the Tuloy kids alongside Nuñez would represent the Philippines in various international youth tournaments.

After leaving Tuloy in 2021, he would rejoin with the foundation once more by captaining their club team, Tuloy F.C., to participate in the 2023 Copa Paulino Alcantara, where he scored one goal.

=== Azkals Development Team ===
In 2022, Nuñez left Tuloy and signed with the Azkals Development Team of the Philippines Football League, a team captain by Stephan Schröck and aimed at developing promising youth footballers for the national team. He joined alongside Tuloy teammates John Jalique, Cyrelle Saut, and Haren de Gracia.

He made 11 appearances during the season and scored one goal, but his season was interrupted when the club unexpectedly and suddenly withdrew from the league before the season's end.

== International career ==
=== Philippines U15 ===
Nuñez was first called up to a national team when he represented the Philippine U15 in the 2019 AFF U-15 Championship, making his debut in a 7–1 loss to Timor Leste. He would score his first international goal in a 3–1 loss to Vietnam. Two months later, he represented the team again in the 2020 AFC U-16 Championship Qualifiers.

=== Philippines U19 ===
After the U15 team, his next international experience was with the Philippine U19 team, where he was called up for the squad in the 2022 AFF U-19 Championship alongside other national team players like Jaime Rosquillo and Sandro Reyes. He made four caps with the U19s.

=== Philippines U23 ===
Nuñez got his first call-up for the Philippines U23 team in 2023, when he was included in the final squad for the 2023 Southeast Asian Games held in Cambodia. In the second match, he notched an assist to Dov Cariño in the last minutes of the game to rescue a point against Cambodia. He would subsequently represent the U23s in the AFF U23 Championship and AFC U23 Qualifiers that same year.

=== Philippines ===
Backed by good performances for the ADT, Nuñez made the jump from youth to senior team when he was included in the Philippines' final 23-man squad for the 2022 AFF Championship. He made his debut on the second matchday in a 5–1 win against Brunei, making him one of the youngest debutants for the Philippines at just over 18 years old.
