= Tyler John =

American soccer player

Personal information
- Full name: Tyler Malik John
- Date of birth: December 30, 1995 (age 30)
- Place of birth: Tacoma, Washington, United States
- Height: 1.83 m (6 ft 0 in)
- Position: Center-back

Team information
- Current team: Tacoma Stars
- Number: 14

Youth career
- 2012–2014: Federal Way

College career
Years	Team	Apps	(Gls)
2014–2016	Highline Thunderbirds		
2016–2018	Seattle Redhawks	27	(3)

Senior career*
Years	Team	Apps	(Gls)
2017–2018	Seattle Sounders 2	0	(0)
2022–	Tacoma Stars (indoor)	61	(31)
–2023	Crossfire Redmond		
2023	Maharlika Taguig		
2024–	Tacoma Stars	9	(1)
- * Club domestic league appearances and goals as of May 12, 2025

Tyler Malik John (born 30 December 1995) is an American professional soccer player who currently plays as a defender for the Tacoma Stars of the Major Arena Soccer League and USL League Two.

== Personal life ==
John was born in Tacoma, Washington. He grew up and studied in Bonney Lake.

== Career ==
=== Youth career ===
In his youth, John played for the youth team of Federal Way FC of the Southern Premier Soccer League, winning the San Diego Surf College Cup in 2012.

=== College career ===
John first played college football for the Thunderbirds of Highline College, initially starting as a midfielder but finding his place as a defender. In 2014, he won the 2014 Northwestern Athletic Conference with Highline in a 3–0 win over the North Idaho Cardinals.

In 2016, he transferred to the Redhawks of Seattle University, becoming an important first-team player and winning another title in 2017, the Western Athletic Conference.

=== Early club career ===
After graduating from Seattle University, he signed with the reserve team of MLS side Seattle Sounders FC. At the same time, he would also go on to play indoor football for the Tacoma Stars of the NPSL. Later on, he signed for Crossfire Redmond until July 2023, when he departed the club.

=== Far East United ===
While playing in the US, he was invited by former Philippines international Anton del Rosario to play for Far East United in The Soccer Tournament in North Carolina, alongside other Southeast Asian legends such as Safee Sali, Charyl Chappuis, and current Azkals player and all-time PFL goalscorer Bienvenido Marañón. In a 4–2 win over West Ham Legends, John scored the opening goal.

=== Maharlika Manila ===
After impressing with Far East United, he moved abroad for the first time, linking up with Anton del Rosario once again as a foreign reinforcement for Maharlika Manila of the Philippines Football League. He made his debut in a 1–1 draw against Manila Digger, scoring his first goal in a 2–0 win over Pilipinas Dragons as Maharlika qualified for the knockouts. He would also play for the club in the 7's Football League.
