= 2018 Copa Paulino Alcantara final =

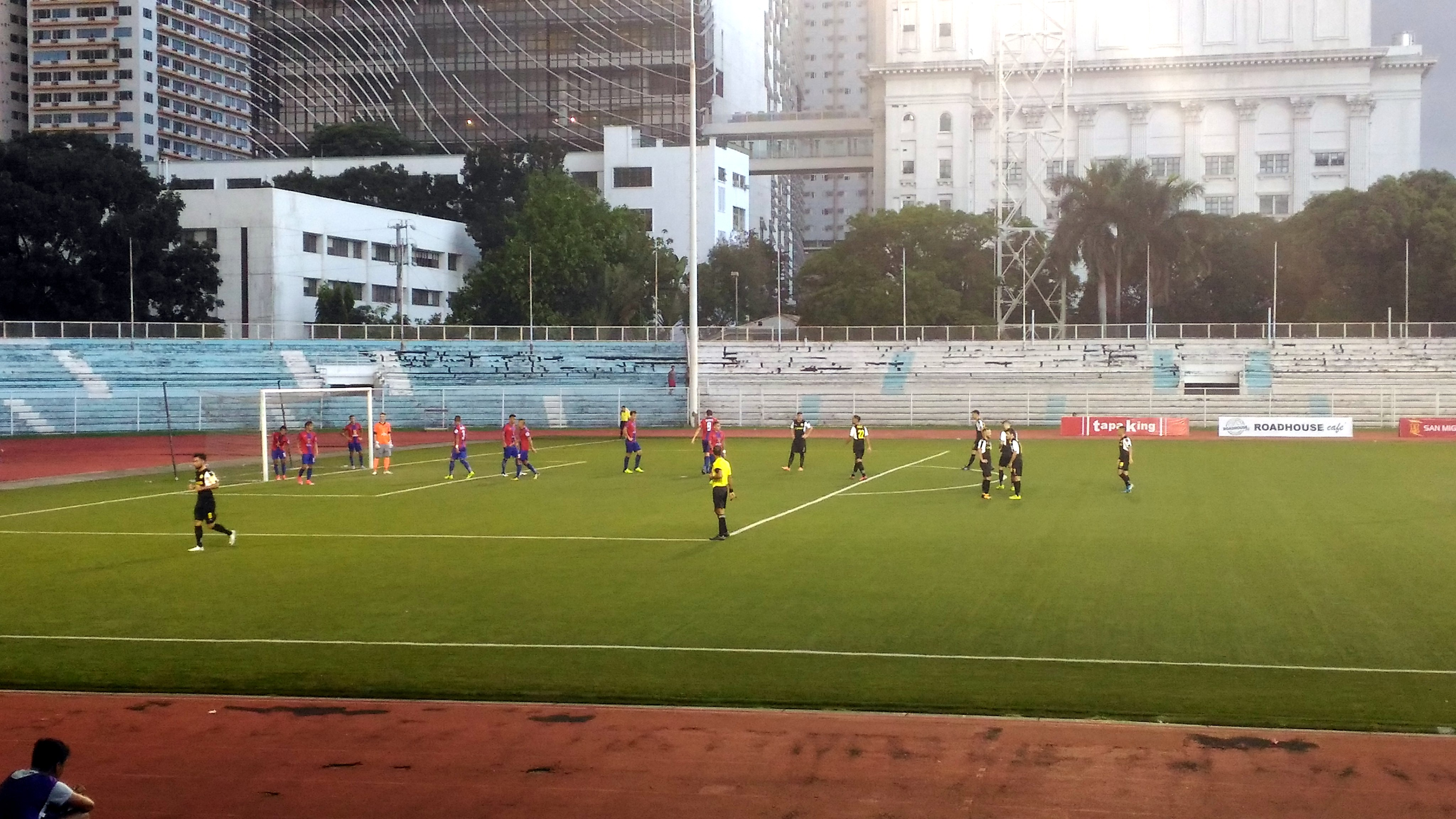
- Rizal Memorial Stadium the venue of the final.
- Event: 2018 Copa Paulino Alcantara
Davao Aguilas	Kaya–Iloilo
0	1
- After extra time
- Date: 27 October 2018
- Venue: Rizal Memorial Stadium, Manila
- Referee: Mongkolchai Pechsri (Thailand)
- Attendance: 1,230

The final of the inaugural season of the Copa Paulino Alcantara was contested by Davao Aguilas F.C. and Kaya F.C.–Iloilo on 27 October 2018 on a neutral ground at the Rizal Memorial Stadium in Manila.

The match also determined the second qualifying team which would represent the Philippines at the 2019 AFC Cup with Ceres-Negros F.C. earlier qualified through winning the 2018 Philippines Football League.

Kaya–Iloilo won in extra time through a solitary goal and qualifies for the 2019 AFC Cup.

== Background ==
Both Davao Aguilas F.C. and Kaya F.C.–Iloilo topped their group in the group stage and advanced to the semi-final. In the knock-out stage, the Aguilas won 6-1 over JPV Marikina on 27 October at the Rizal Memorial Stadium, the same venue of the final, while Kaya overcame Stallion Laguna by winning 3-2 in their semifinal tie at home at the Iloilo Sports Complex. In the 2018 Philippines Football League, Kaya has won over the Aguilas while the Aguilas is coming from an undefeated streak of at least eleven matches heading into the final.

Kaya were also aiming for the title to honor the namesake of the club, Paulino Alcántara who is a native of their home locality, Iloilo.

Ceres–Negros F.C. the winners of the 2018 Philippines Football League fail to advance from the group stage.

== Route to the final ==
Davao Aguilas		Round	Kaya-Iloilo	
Opponent	Result	Group stage	Opponent	Result
Ceres–Negros	3–1	Matchday 1	Global Cebu	4–0
Ceres–Negros	2–1	Matchday 2	JPV Marikina	1–0
Stallion Laguna	0–0	Matchday 3	Global Cebu	3–3
Stallion Laguna	4–0	Matchday 4	JPV Marikina	1–0
Group A winners: Pos / Team / Pld / Pts; 1 / Davao Aguilas / 4 / 10; 2 / Stallion Laguna / 4 / 4; 3 / Ceres–Negros / 4 / 3; Source: LFI		Final standings	Group B winners: Pos / Team / Pld / Pts; 1 / Kaya–Iloilo / 4 / 10; 2 / JPV Marikina / 4 / 6; 3 / Global Cebu / 4 / 1; Source: LFI	
Opponent	Result	Knockout phase	Opponent	Result
JPV Marikina	6–1	Semi-finals	Stallion Laguna	3–2

== Match summary ==
The final was contested in a neutral venue at the Rizal Memorial Stadium in Manila. The match held on 27 October 2018 was attended by 1,230 people. Thai referee, Mongkolchai Pechsri officiated the final.

Kaya–Iloilo and the Davao Aguilas was unable to score a goal against each other in regular time of the final. Both teams had at least two goal scoring attempts that was denied by the crossbar. Wesley Dos Santos, a center back of the Davao Aguilas was sent off in added time in the 98th minute after he incurred a second yellow card by fouling Connor Tacagni of the opposing team. The first yellow card was given to Dos Santos in the first half of the final. The draw in regular time meant that the match had to go extra time. Iloilo-native Jovin Bedic scored the winning goal for Kaya near the end of the second half of extra time benefiting from an assist made by Robert Lopez Mendy.

The match ended with a scoreline of 1–0 in favor of Kaya–Iloilo which earned a slot in the 2019 AFC Cup. The Iloilo-based club previously qualified for the 2016 AFC Cup play-offs by winning the 2015 UFL Cup. Davao Aguilas meanwhile earned standby team designation for the same tournament meaning that they will be able to participate in the Asian club competition if Ceres-Negros advance to the 2019 AFC Champions League group stage.

27 October 2018
17:00 UTC+8

Davao Aguilas	0–1 (a.e.t.)	Kaya–Iloilo
		Bedic 119'

Rizal Memorial Stadium, Manila
Attendance: 1,230
Referee: Mongkolchai Pechsri (Thailand)

Davao Aguilas	Kaya–Iloilo

GK	1	(Philippines) Patrick Deyto
	15	(Philippines) Walter Hall
	30	(Brazil) Wesley Dos Santos (red card) 98'
	28	(Philippines) Marco Casambre
	5	(Papua New Guinea) Brad McDonald
	23	(Philippines) Adam Reed
	10	(Philippines) Phil Younghusband (c)
	6	(Philippines) Jason de Jong
	7	(Philippines) James Younghusband
	24	(South Korea) Kim Sungmin
	3	(Philippines) Matthew Hartmann
Substitutes:
GK	2	(Philippines) Ronilo Bayan Jr.
	22	(Philippines) Dennis Villanueva
	13	(Philippines) Joshua Grommen
	20	(Philippines) Dylan de Bruycker
	18	(Philippines) Julian Clariño
	11	(Australia) Tahj Minniecon
	26	(Philippines) Daniel Gadia
Head Coach:
(Philippines) Melchor Anzures

GK	25	(Philippines) Nathanael Villanueva
	6	(Philippines) Jalsor Soriano
	4	(Japan) Masanari Omura
	5	(Philippines) Camelo Tacusalme
	27	(Philippines) Shirmar Felongco
	24	(Philippines) Marwin Angeles
	10	(Philippines) Miguel Tanton
	16	(Ghana) Alfred Osei
	7	(Philippines) Jovin Bedic (c)
	29	(Philippines) Connor Tacagni
	17	(Senegal) Robert Lopez Mendy
Substitutes:
GK	1	(Philippines) Ref Cuaresma
	23	(Philippines) Audie Menzi
	13	(Philippines) Janrick Soriano
	3	(Philippines) Chy Villaseñor
	21	(Philippines) Arnel Amita
	8	(Philippines) Anton Ugarte
	18	(Cameroon) Serge Kaole
Head Coach:
(Philippines) Noel Marcaida
