= Stephan Schröck =

Footballer (born 1986)

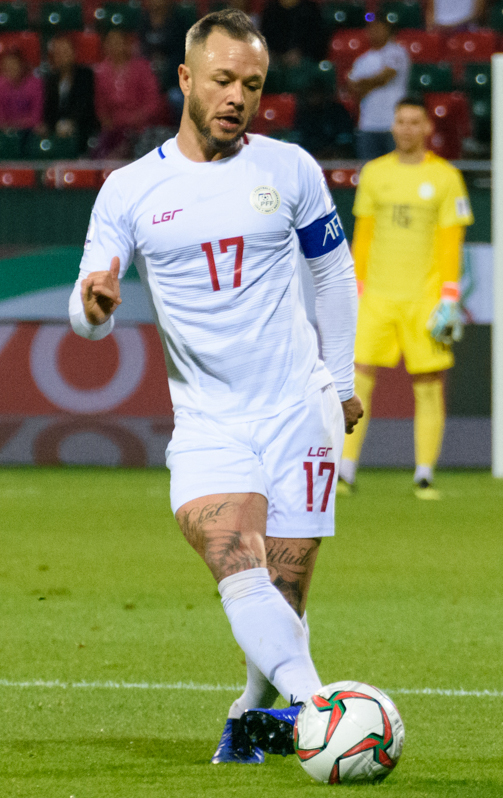
- Schröck playing for Philippines at the 2019 Asian Cup

Personal information
- Full name: Stephan Markus Cabizares Schröck
- Date of birth: 21 August 1986 (age 40)
- Place of birth: Schweinfurt, West Germany
- Height: 1.70 m (5 ft 7 in)
- Positions: Attacking midfielder; winger

Team information
- Current team: One Taguig
- Number: 17

Youth career
- 1991–2001: DJK Schweinfurt
- 2001–2004: Greuther Fürth

Senior career*
Years	Team	Apps	(Gls)
2004–2012	Greuther Fürth	183	(7)
2012–2013	TSG Hoffenheim	10	(0)
2013–2014	Eintracht Frankfurt	12	(0)
2014–2017	Greuther Fürth	42	(0)
2016	→ Ceres (loan)	28	(19)
2017–2022	United City	60	(22)
2022–2023	Azkals Development Team	16	(1)
2023	CF Manila		
2024	One Taguig	10	(0)
2025	Stallion Laguna	14	(2)
2026–	One Taguig	3	(1)

International career
2004	Germany U18	2	(0)
2004–2005	Germany U19	12	(1)
2005	Germany U20	2	(0)
2019–2022	Philippines U23	6	(2)
2011–2024	Philippines	61	(6)
Medal record
Men's football
Representing Philippines
AFC Challenge Cup
Silver medal – second place	2014 Maldives
Bronze medal – third place	2012 Nepal
- * Club domestic league appearances and goals

Stephan Markus Cabizares Schröck (German: [ˈʃʁøːk]; born 21 August 1986) is a professional football player who plays as an attacking midfielder or winger for Philippines Football League club One Taguig. Born in Germany, he was a Germany youth international but switched to the Philippines at senior level.

Schröck began his professional career in Germany with Greuther Fürth and was part of the squad that won the 2011–12 2. Bundesliga. He then played in the Bundesliga with TSG Hoffenheim and Eintracht Frankfurt before returning to Greuther Fürth in 2014. He joined Filipino club Ceres (later United City) on loan in 2016, with a permanent transfer the following season. Schröck helped Ceres/United City win four consecutive Philippines Football League titles from 2017 to 2020, and received the Golden Ball award in the last two seasons.

He made his debut for the Philippines in 2011 and captained the team from 2019 until 2023.

== Early life ==
Schröck was born on 21 August 1986 in Schweinfurt, West Germany to a German father and a Filipina mother. His mother is from Parang, Maguindanao del Norte but grew up in Cebu.

Schröck's parents separated when he was six years old, leaving him and sister with his mother. His mother had to simultaneously do two to three jobs in order to support their family. Growing up in Schweinfurt, Schröck turned to football as a means to cope with their difficult situation. Prior to taking up football, Schröck tried boxing since his father was a boxer.

== Club career ==
=== Greuther Fürth ===
Schröck started at Greuther Fürth in 2001, going through the junior teams and made the leap into the professional squad in the 2004–05 season. In April 2008, Schröck signed a two-year contract extension with Greuther Fürth. Two years later, in March 2010, Schröck again extended his contract for another two years. Although he revealed that he could have gone to five other clubs with better financial benefits, he chose to stay to repay the backing that the club has always shown him. He also wanted to reach the Bundesliga with the club and believed it would be an achievable target before his contract expired. In the 2011–12 season, his final year at the club, he helped the team win the league title and gain promotion to the Bundesliga.

=== 1899 Hoffenheim ===
In late March 2012, Schröck signed a three-year deal with Bundesliga side TSG 1899 Hoffenheim. He made his debut in a 4–0 home defeat to Eintracht Frankfurt but was sent off after 74 minutes. Schröck started and put up a great performance against league leaders Bayern Munich on 3 March 2013. He came as close as anyone to scoring for Hoffenheim with a lovely shot which Starke saved well.

=== Eintracht Frankfurt ===
On 27 June 2013, Bundesliga club Eintracht Frankfurt announced that they had signed Schröck on a two-year deal. He made his debut against champions Bayern Munich and received a yellow card after a foul on Franck Ribéry. Schröck scored his first goal for Frankfurt in a Europa League match against APOEL Nicosia.

=== Return to Greuther Fürth ===
After only a season with Frankfurt, Schröck returned to Greuther Fürth. However, in January 2016, it was reported that Fürth allowed Schröck to look for a new club, excusing him from two weeks of training. He was set to leave the club and prematurely end his contract. Schröck wanted to play as an attacking midfielder instead of a right back; however, the position was contested among other players of the club such as Sebastian Freis.

On 15 April 2017, Greuther Fürth and Schröck reported having mutually agreed to release Schröck, as confirmed by an official post by the club on its website and Schröck himself through a Facebook post.

=== Loan to Ceres ===
On 13 January 2016, United Football League side Ceres announced that they signed Schröck to play for the club on a loan basis at least until August. Ceres' rival, Global reportedly tried to get Schröck to play for them.

Schröck made his UFL debut for Ceres at the 2016 UFL Cup in a 2–1 win over Loyola Meralco Sparks Schröck was played as a winger in the front but did not score a single goal despite numerous attempts. Prior to his Ceres stint, he was often played as a midfielder or defender while playing in Germany. Ceres coach Ali Go remarked that the club was still exploring what position is the best for Schröck adding that with a few more games, the footballer would get used to the Philippine and Asian-style of play.

Schröck's loan agreement to Ceres, originally to be ended in August, was extended until January 2017.

=== United City ===
Schröck returned to Ceres, who renamed themselves as Ceres–Negros when they joined the Philippines Football League (PFL). The move was announced by the club on 27 April 2017, and Schröck went on to become a key player of the club, helping them clinch three straight PFL titles and one trophy in the Copa Paulino Alcantara.

Ceres–Negros underwent a change in management and was reorganized as United City when MMC Sportz Asia took over the club. The new management had to secure Schröck's continued service with the club. Schröck also received offers from clubs outside the Philippines which reportedly include Bundesliga side TSG 1899 Hoffenheim and sides from Thailand and South Korea. On 28 July 2020, it was announced that Schröck would remain in the newly renamed club and was also designated captain and playing assistant coach.

Due to logistical issues caused by the COVID-19 pandemic in mid-2020, Schröck was left stranded in Germany where he joined TV Königsberg, a lower division club, as a guest player in order to maintain his fitness. He was able to return to the Philippines by October 2020.

On 26 June 2021, he scored his and the club's first-ever AFC Champions League goal in their first-ever match in the tournament, a 1–1 draw against Beijing Guoan.

In March 2022, after a 5-year stint with the club, Schröck and United City mutually agreed on the termination his contract.

=== ADT ===
Schröck moved to the Azkals Development Team for the 2022–23 PFL season which kicked off in August 2022. A veteran among the roster filled with prospect national team players, Schröck was named captain of the club. He was also made part of ADT's coaching staff led by coach Norman Fegidero. He set up the Azkals Development Academy (ADA), which is affiliated with the club.

ADT would leave the PFL after withdrawing in the middle of the 2022–23 season.

=== CF Manila ===
Schröck would form CF Manila from players from ADA. The club entered the 2023 Copa Paulino Alcantara. Schröck himself would feature for the club as a player.

=== One Taguig ===
Schröck joined the then-newly formed One Taguig in 2024 which debuted at the PFL. On 21 August 2024, his 38th birthday, Schröck announced his retirement from playing.

=== Azkals 7s ===
Schröck briefly joined the seven-a-side football team Azkals 7s which played in the 2024 Asia 7s Championship in Malaysia. They finished as runners-up losing 1–2 to Japan Football 7 Society Association's team.

=== Stallion Laguna ===
Schröck returned to standard 11-a-side football, joining Stallion Laguna of the PFL in February 2025.

=== Return to One Taguig ===
Schröck returned to One Taguig in January 2026.

=== Azkals Development Club ===
Schröck took up the role of player-coach of the Azkals Development Club (ADC) futsal team in the inaugural 2026 PFF Futsaliga. He helped ADC won the inaugural men's open cup title.

== International career ==
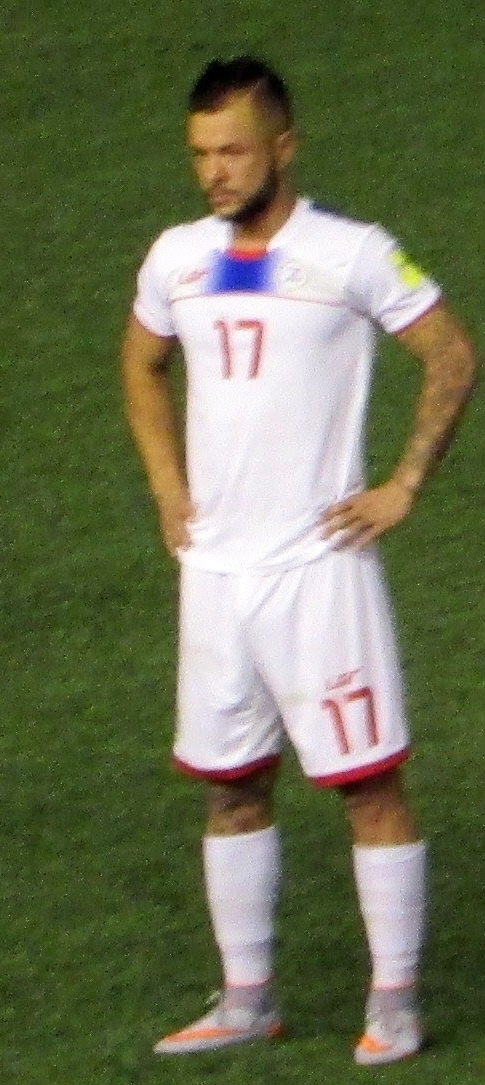
Schröck with the Philippine national team 2015.

Schröck was born to a German father and a Filipina mother, making him eligible to represent Germany or the Philippines at the international level. He initially chose Germany, as he has represented the country at U-18, U-19 and U-20 levels.

Under previous FIFA statutes, Schröck could have switched to the Philippines until his 21st birthday but he did not take that option, neither was he called up during this time. In early October 2008, the Philippine Football Federation wanted to get him to play for the Philippines in 2008 AFF Championship qualification tournament. However, he was not able to as he was already over the age of 21. FIFA eventually removed the age limit on players switching nations in early June 2009, making him eligible again to switch to the Philippines. In July 2010, Schröck announced his intention to play for the Philippines in the 2010 AFF Championship qualification tournament in Laos, but was ultimately left out of the squad as his documents had not been processed in time.

=== 2014 FIFA World Cup qualifiers ===
It is a great honor to play for the country of my mother. It makes me really proud. I owe everything to her and all I have is because of my mother. Playing for the Philippines is my way of saying thank you to my mum.

— Schröck

It was only in March 2011 when he went to the Philippines to finalize his documents and was tipped to be ready for the 2014 FIFA World Cup qualification first round. He eventually made his full international debut for the Philippines in the first leg of the first round of the World Cup qualifiers on 29 June 2011 against Sri Lanka, playing the full 90 minutes in a 1–1 draw and also receiving a yellow card. In the second leg on 3 July 2011, he again played the full 90 minutes in a 4–0 win. However, he received another yellow card and was suspended along with team captain Alexander Borromeo for the first leg of the second round qualifiers against Kuwait. The Philippine Football Federation appealed to FIFA to rescind his suspension, but was unsuccessful.

Without Schröck, the Philippines lost 3–0 to Kuwait in the first-leg. Believing the deficit could be overturned, he came back for the second leg against the wishes of his club. He would score the opening goal from 25 yards deep into the first half injury time, but it was not enough to help the Philippines make a comeback as they eventually lost 2–1.

=== 2014 AFC Challenge Cup ===
Schröck scored his second international goal less than a minute into the second half of the 2014 AFC Challenge Cup qualifier against Cambodia. The Philippines would go on to win 8–0. Two days later, he was awarded by the Asian Football Confederation (AFC) as the MVP in the 1–0 win over Turkmenistan, helping the Philippines qualify for the 2014 AFC Challenge Cup.

On 4 August 2014, Schröck announced he was "resigning" from the Philippines national team, effectively announcing his international retirement to "pursue new challenges". He then revealed that he resigned as a protest against coach Thomas Dooley and was effectively giving an ultimatum, saying he would no longer play for the country while Dooley remained coach. Schröck went on to criticize the team management, claiming there were internal problems in the Philippine Football Federation and labelled the team a "chicken farm", a German expression meaning highly disorganized, before saying he felt the veteran players were not being respected.

The dispute seemed to have been finally settled on 10 March 2015, when reports indicated that Schröck had apologized to Dooley. This was later confirmed by the player on his official Facebook page.

On 12 November 2015, he played his first game for the team as captain against Yemen. Schröck's relationship with Dooley worsened after the 2016 AFF Championship, and he never received a call up to the national team for the rest of Dooley's tenure as coach which lasted until 2018.

=== 2019 AFC Asian Cup ===
Schröck received a call up to the Philippine national team for a training camp in Bahrain under new head coach Scott Cooper, and was part of the squad that played in the 2018 AFF Championship where the Philippines, mentored by Sven-Göran Eriksson, finished as semifinalists for the fourth time.

He also played in the 2019 AFC Asian Cup as captain of the team. The Philippines lost all three of their matches. The Philippines' lone goal at the tournament was scored by Schröck in the last match against Kyrgyzstan. It was scored from a far away free kick; the ball was meant to be head-butted in but no player reached it—and to the goalie's surprise—it bounced and made it into the back of the net.

After the AFC Asian Cup, Schröck expressed his intention to retire from the national team, citing his age and plans to focus on his family and club career. Schröck would continue to play for the national team, featuring for the Philippines at the 2020 AFF Championship in December 2021.

=== 2019 Southeast Asian Games ===
In late November 2019, Schröck was one of the two over-age players to be included in the Philippines U-22 squad for the 2019 Southeast Asian Games, hosted by the Philippines.

=== 2021 Southeast Asian Games ===
Schröck was named as one of the over-aged players for the Philippines under-23 team at the 31st Southeast Asian Games, which was held in Vietnam.

=== 2022 AFF Championship ===
Schröck was called up to the national team for the 2022 AFF Championship tournament. He was the oldest outfield player in the tournament at the age of 36. With his team eliminated early from the group stage, Schröck announced the tournament would be his last appearance for the national team. His final match was against Indonesia on 2 January 2023, where he provided an assist for Sebastian Rasmussen in a 2–1 defeat.

=== Return from retirement ===
Schröck came out of retirement and featured on 15 June 2023 friendly match against Nepal. He came in as a substitute in the game which ended with 1–0 win. He was urged to play by returning coach Michael Weiß. He was once again called up to play against Vietnam and Indonesia in the November 2023 window of the 2026 FIFA World Cup qualifiers.

He has represented the Philippines in the 7's Football League since 2024.

== Personal life ==
On 28 May 2011, Schröck married Pina in Germany, whom he knew since childhood.

== Career statistics ==
=== International ===
Appearances and goals by national team and year
National team	Year	Apps	Goals
Philippines	2011	3	1
Philippines	2012	3	0
Philippines	2013	6	2
Philippines	2014	6	0
Philippines	2015	6	1
Philippines	2016	5	0
Philippines	2017	0	0
Philippines	2018	7	0
Philippines	2019	9	2
Philippines	2020	0	0
Philippines	2021	6	0
Philippines	2022	6	0
Philippines	2023	4	0
Total		61	6

Scores and results list the Philippine's goal tally first, score column indicates score after each Schröck goal.

List of international goals scored by Stephan Schröck
No.	Date	Venue	Opponent	Score	Result	Competition	Ref.
1	28 July 2011	Rizal Memorial Stadium, Manila, Philippines	Kuwait	1–0	1–2	2014 FIFA World Cup qualification	
2	24 March 2013	Rizal Memorial Stadium, Manila, Philippines	Cambodia	5–0	8–0	2014 AFC Challenge Cup qualification	
3	15 October 2013	Panaad Stadium, Bacolod, Philippines	Pakistan	3–1	3–1	2013 Philippine Peace Cup	
4	8 September 2015	Philippine Sports Stadium, Bocaue, Philippines	Uzbekistan	1–4	1–5	2018 FIFA World Cup qualification	
5	16 January 2019	Rashid Stadium, Dubai, United Arab Emirates	Kyrgyzstan	1–3	1–3	2019 AFC Asian Cup	
6	10 September 2019	GFA National Training Center, Dededo, Guam	Guam	3–1	4–1	2022 FIFA World Cup qualification	

== Honours ==
=== Club ===
Azkals Development Club (futsal)

- PFF Futsaliga: 2026

Greuther Fürth

- 2. Bundesliga: 2011–12

United City

- Philippines Football League: 2017, 2018, 2019, 2020
- Copa Paulino Alcantara: 2019
- United Football League Cup runner-up: 2016

=== International ===
Philippines

- AFC Challenge Cup runner-up: 2014

=== Individual ===
- PSA Annual Awards Mr. Football: 2013, 2019
- Philippines Football League Golden Ball: 2019, 2020
- ASEAN Football Federation Best XI: 2019
- Singapore Cup top scorer: 2016 (7 goals)
