= Kart Talaroc =

Filipino footballer

Personal information
- Full name: Kart Pitogo Talaroc
- Date of birth: March 30, 2001 (age 25)
- Place of birth: Manticao, Philippines
- Positions: Full-back; midfielder

Team information
- Current team: Davao Aguilas
- Number: 13

Youth career
- 2018–2020: FEU Baby Tamaraws

College career
Years	Team	Apps	(Gls)
- University of Makati

Senior career*
Years	Team	Apps	(Gls)
2023–	Davao Aguilas	9	(1)

International career^{‡}
2023–	Philippines U23	2	(0)
- * Club domestic league appearances and goals as of 14:49, March 25, 2024 (UTC) ‡ National team caps and goals as of 14:49, March 25, 2024 (UTC)

Kart Pitogo Talaroc (born 30 March 2001) is a Filipino professional footballer who plays as a full-back or midfielder for Davao Aguilas of the Philippines Football League and the Philippine U23 National Team.

== Personal life ==
Talaroc was born in the municipality of Manticao in Misamis Oriental in the Philippines. His brother, Richard, also plays football for the Aguilas.

== Career ==
=== Youth career ===
Talaroc played high school football for the Baby Tamaraws of Far Eastern University, winning two titles in between 2018 and 2020. In 2019, he won the award for UAAP Junior Rookie of the Year. However, his stint at FEU was cut short due to restrictions imposed by the COVID-19 pandemic. In 2021, he was playing for the college team of the University of Makati while playing for Davao Aguilas academy.

=== Davao Aguilas ===
Talaroc made his professional and senior debut for Davao in 2023, as the club participated in the 2023 Copa Paulino Alcantara and returned to pro football. He scored his first goal, a penalty, in a 5–0 win over Tuloy FC. He remained in Davao's starting XI as the club went on a fairytale run to the final, losing to Kaya–Iloilo on penalties.

== International career ==
=== Philippines U23 ===
In August 2023, Talaroc got his first call-up to the national team as he joined the Philippine U23 team for the 2023 AFF U-23 Championship. He made his debut in the second match, a 1–0 loss to Vietnam, as a starter. He would be called up again for the team in the AFC U23 Asian Cup Qualifiers.
