= Pilipinas Dragons F.C. =

Pilipinas Dragons
- Crest used in the 2023 Copa Paulino Alcantara
- Full name: Pilipinas Dragons Football Club
- Nickname: The Dragons
- Short name: PDFC
- Founded: 2013; 13 years ago
Home colours	Away colours

Pilipinas Dragons Football Club, also known as Dragons Elite, is a Philippine developmental football club from Taguig, Metro Manila.

== Background ==
The Pilipinas Dragons have participated in the United Football League (UFL) Youth League and were the U15 champions in 2015.

They made their Copa Paulino Alcantara debut in the 2023 edition.

== Domestic tournament records ==
Season	Division	League Position	Copa Paulino Alcantara
2023	Did not participate		Group stage
