= Paolo Bugas =

Filipino association football player

Personal information
- Full name: Paolo Arellano Bugas
- Date of birth: October 22, 1994 (age 32)
- Place of birth: Nabunturan, Davao de Oro, Philippines
- Height: 1.65 m (5 ft 5 in)
- Position: Right winger

Team information
- Current team: Kaya–Iloilo

College career
Years	Team	Apps	(Gls)
- Far Eastern University

Senior career*
Years	Team	Apps	(Gls)
2012–2014	Loyola	8	(0)
2014–2018	Global	43	(3)
2018–2019	Stallion Laguna	1	(1)
2019	Green Archers United	21	(3)
2020	Global	0	(0)
2023	Davao Aguilas	5	(0)
2024	United City	14	(2)
2024–2025	Davao Aguilas	0	(0)
2025–	Kaya–Iloilo		

International career^{‡}
2014–2015	Philippines U23	4	(0)
2014–2016	Philippines	5	(0)
- * Club domestic league appearances and goals as of 00:03, August 20, 2024 (UTC) ‡ National team caps and goals as of 12:32, March 30, 2022 (UTC)

Paolo Bugas (born October 22, 1994) is a Filipino footballer who plays as a forward for Philippines Football League club Kaya F.C.–Iloilo. He has also played for the Philippines national team.

== College career ==
Bugas was born at Nabunturan, Compostela Valley (now Davao de Oro) and a player for the FEU Tamaraws football team of the Far Eastern University. He was named Most Valuable Player at UAAP Season 76 in 2014.

== Club career ==
=== Loyola ===
On 8 March 2014, Bugas made his debut for the Sparks as a substitute, replacing Simon Greatwich at the 62nd minute against Global.

=== Global ===
On 18 July 2015, Bugas made his debut for Global in a 2–2 draw against Manila Jeepney. He came in as a substitute replacing OJ Clariño on the 67th minute.

=== Davao Aguilas ===
He is a part of the Davao Aguilas squad for the 2023 Copa Paulino Alcantara season.

=== United City ===
In January 2024, Bugas has signed with United City F.C. in the Philippines Football League.

== International career ==
He made his first International cap for the Philippines in a 3-nil home victory against Cambodia

Bugas came in as a substitute in the 66th minute replacing Daisuke Sato in a friendly match against the Maldives on September 3, 2015.

== Coaching career ==
Bugas started his coaching career in 2024 with Far Eastern University Diliman as part of the coaching staff of the high school football team.
