= Yannick Tuason =

Philippine footballer (born 1989)

Personal information
- Date of birth: 4 January 1989 (age 37)
- Place of birth: Manila, Philippines
- Height: 1.75 m (5 ft 9 in)
- Position: Forward

Team information
- Current team: One Taguig
- Number: 11

College career
Years	Team	Apps	(Gls)
- University of Santo Tomas

Senior career*
Years	Team	Apps	(Gls)
2008–2012	Kaya		
2013	Pasargad	2	(0)
2013–2016	Manila Jeepney	0	(0)
2016–2019	Stallion Laguna	26	(7)
2019–2020	Kaya–Iloilo	9	(1)
2020	Global	0	(0)
2020	Maharlika Manila	5	(0)
2021–2023	Stallion Laguna		
2023–2024	Davao Aguilas	5	(5)
2024–	One Taguig		

International career
2011–	Philippines	4	(0)
- * Club domestic league appearances and goals

Yannick Tuason (born January 4, 1989) is a Filipino footballer who plays as a forward for One Taguig and the Philippines national team. He played college football for the University of Santo Tomas in the UAAP and began his professional career with Kaya in 2008.

== Club career ==
Tuason transfers to PSG at the middle of 2013 United Football League season.

He was part of the Maharlika Manila squad for the 2020 Philippines Football League season. After a stint with Stallion FC, he is now a part of the Davao Aguilas squad for the 2023 Copa Paulino Alcantara season.

== International career ==
Tuason was called up for the Philippine team since late 2010. He made his international debut as a substitute to winger Emelio Caligdong during the 2012 AFC Challenge Cup qualifiers against Myanmar.

In November 2017, After his 6 years absence in the national team, Tuason was included in the Philippines squad for 2017 CTFA International Tournament in Taiwan.
