= Tuloy F.C. =

Tuloy
- Full name: Tuloy Football Club
- Owner: Tuloy Foundation
- Head coach: Taketomo Suzuki
- League: Philippines Football League
- 2025–26: Philippines Football League, 9th of 11
Home colours	Away colours	Third colours

Tuloy Football Club is a Philippine professional football club based in Alabang, Muntinlupa. The club plays in the Philippines Football League, the top-flight league of football in the Philippines. They are affiliated with the Tuloy Foundation.

== History ==
Tuloy Football Club's majority of players initially came from the Tuloy Foundation, a street children village.

The Tuloy Foundation itself was established in 1996, with Salesian priest Rocky Evangelista as its founder. Evangelista would start Tuloy's football program in 2001. A bona fide football club by Tuloy would be established later.

Tuloy entered its first major tournament, the 2023 edition of the Copa Paulino Alcantara. In late 2023, Tuloy announced that they would be joining the 2024 Philippines Football League, the top-flight league of football in the Philippines The league confirmed the club's participation in February 2024 making their first ever debut in the top-flight league. On 14 April 2024, Tuloy recorded their first ever league win in the top-flight in a 5–0 win against Manila Montet.

In January 2026, Tuloy entered into an agreement with the Clark Development Corporation to develop a home pitch at the Clark Parade Grounds for the club's grassroots program.

== Players ==
As of 16 September 2026

Note: Flags indicate national team as defined under FIFA eligibility rules; some limited exceptions apply. Players may hold more than one non-FIFA nationality.

No.	Pos.	Nation	Player
1	GK	PHI	Michael Antilo
2	DF	PHI	Rocky Grizola
3	FW	PHI	Bryant Sidney
6	MF	PHI	Cyrus Gamboa
7	FW	PHI	Cyrelle Saut
8	DF	PHI	Syron Saut
9	DF	PHI	Gabriel Vergara
10	MF	PHI	Harry Nuñez (Captain)
11	FW	PHI	JastIn Lupango
12	DF	PHI	Jhon Diaz
13	DF	PHI	Razel Aguila
14	DF	PHI	Denmark Uracoy
15	DF	PHI	Jian Capistrano

No.	Pos.	Nation	Player
16	GK	PHI	Zyrel Randing
17	FW	PHI	John Lloyd Jalique (Captain)
19	FW	PHI	Everth Farnazo
23	MF	PHI	Alvin Quidores
24	MF	PHI	Lawrence Binalong
25	DF	PHI	Clark Gobuyan
28	DF	PHI	Rommy Dayandayan
29	MF	PHI	Nelboy Panuman
42	FW	NMI	Markus Toves
51	GK	PHI	Chrisjan Tambilawan
—	GK	PHI	Zaijan Delicana
—	FW	PHI	Hamdani Nor
—	FW	PHI	Prince Amancio

== Personnel (2026) ==
Position	Name
Head coach	(Japan) Taketomo Suzuki
Team Manager	(Philippines) Michelle Rabaya
Assistant coaches	(Philippines) Jerico Aniciete
Assistant coaches	(Philippines) Jayson Turco
Assistant coaches	(Philippines) Bryan Capistrano
Assistant coaches	(Philippines) James Demate
Assistant coaches	(Philippines) Ivan Caiña
Assistant coaches	(Philippines) Francis Punla

== Domestic tournament records ==
Season	Division	League position	Copa Paulino Alcantara
2023	Did not participate		Group stage
2024	PFL	12th	—
2024-25	Did not participate		—
2025-26	PFL	9th	
