= Cristián Ivanobski =

Argentine footballer

Personal information
- Full name: Cristián Nicolás Ivanobski
- Date of birth: 2 November 1990 (age 36)
- Place of birth: Tigre, Argentina
- Height: 1.69 m (5 ft 7 in)
- Position: Winger

Team information
- Current team: Muang Trang United

Senior career*
| Years | Team | Apps | (Gls) |
| 2012–2013 | Tigre | 0 | (0) |
| 2013–2014 | Santiago Morning | 38 | (8) |
| 2014–2015 | Barnechea | 29 | (4) |
| 2015–2016 | Deportes Antofagasta | 15 | (1) |
| 2016–2017 | Cimarrones de Sonora | 36 | (1) |
| 2017–2018 | Zacatepec | 25 | (2) |
| 2018 | Cobreloa | 14 | (2) |
| 2020–2021 | Puerto Montt | 15 | (2) |
| 2021 | Los Angeles Force | 13 | (3) |
| 2023–2024 | Stallion Laguna | 13 | (1) |
| 2025–2026 | Stallion Laguna | 19 | (1) |
| 2026– | Muang Trang United | 0 | (0) |
- * Club domestic league appearances and goals as of 2 July 2024

Cristián Nicolás Ivanobski (born 11 February 1990) is an Argentine professional footballer who plays for Thai League 3 club Muang Trang United.
