= CF Manila =

Filipino association football club based in Manila

- Team crest used during 2023 Copa Paulino Alcantara
- Full name: Club de Fútbol Manila
- Short name: CFM
- Founded: 2023; 3 years ago
- Ground: Rizal Memorial Stadium
- Capacity: 12,873
Home colours	Away colours

Club de Fútbol Manila (CF Manila) is a Philippine professional football club. Affiliated with former Philippines international Stephan Schröck, CF Manila was formed from the Azkals Development Team (ADT).

== History ==
CF Manila is an offshoot of the Azkals Development Team (ADT) led by former Philippines international and coach Stephan Schröck. Despite ADT's departure mid-season from the 2022–23 Philippines Football League, the club expressed intention of joining the 2023 iteration of the Copa Paulino Alcantara. ADA itself would not be part of the draw.

Instead, Schröck formed a new club from the core players of ADA named Inter Manila to compete in the cup tournament. Days prior to the start of the tournament, Inter Manila changed their name to Club de Fútbol Manila, after a namesake club released a statement in early July 2023. The other club clarified they would not be joining the Copa and noted usage of its name "without authorization".

A women's side took part in the 2025 iteration of the PFF Women's Cup.

== Domestic tournament records ==
Season	Division	League position	Copa Paulino Alcantara
2023	Did not participate		Quarter-finals
2024	Did not participate		
