= Audie Menzi =

Filipino footballer (born 1994)

Personal information
- Full name: Audie Bantas Menzi
- Date of birth: October 11, 1994 (age 32)
- Place of birth: La Trinidad, Benguet, Philippines
- Height: 1.72 m (5 ft 8 in)
- Positions: Right-back; centre-back

Team information
- Current team: Kaya–Iloilo
- Number: 44

Youth career
- 2011–2014: FEU Baby Tamaraws

College career
| Years | Team | Apps | (Gls) |
| 2014–2018 | Far Eastern University | | |

Senior career*
| Years | Team | Apps | (Gls) |
| 2016 | Kaya | 9 | (0) |
| 2017–2018 | Kaya Elite | | |
| 2018– | Kaya–Iloilo | 35 | (2) |

International career^{‡}
| 2022– | Philippines | 7 | (2) |
- * Club domestic league appearances and goals as of 4:24, August 26, 2023 (UTC) ‡ National team caps and goals as of 14:15; 14 November 2024 (UTC)

Audie Bantas Menzi (born 11 October 1994) is a Filipino professional footballer who plays as a defender for Philippines Football League club Kaya–Iloilo and the Philippines national team.

== Personal life ==
Menzi was born in La Trinidad, Benguet. He is of Igorot descent. His brother, Michael, was also his teammate at Kaya and now plays with fellow PFL side Stallion Laguna. His favorite footballer is David Beckham.

== Career ==
=== Far Eastern University ===
Prior to college, he had played with the high school team of Far Eastern University, named the Baby Tamaraws, and won four straight UAAP football titles. As a baby Tamaraw, Menzi won Rookie of the Year, Best Defender, and MVP. In 2012, he represented the National Capital Region in the 2012 Palarong Pambansa, where they finished as 2nd runner-up. In 2014, he graduated to the college team of FEU and played for four years, while simultaneously playing in the United Football League. In 2015, he was part of the FEU side that won a college football title in Season 77 over the De La Salle Green Archers.

=== Kaya Elite ===
In 2016, while still in college, he was signed by United Football League team Kaya. Due to the UFL being a semi-professional league, he was allowed to play despite also playing for FEU. In 2017, however, the Philippines Football League was established and became fully professional, which prompted him to be temporarily demoted to Kaya's B-Team, named "Kaya Elite".

=== Kaya–Iloilo ===
Before the start of the 2018 PFL season, he graduated from FEU and signed for the first team of Kaya, now named Kaya–Iloilo, along with his brother Michael.

He would go on to play in the final of that year's Copa Paulino Alcantara, with Kaya triumphing over Davao Aguilas 1–0. In 2021, he was in the starting XI for Kaya's AFC Champions League playoff match against Shanghai Port of China, scoring a header in the 17th minute that would end up being the winning goal. In 2023, he won his first league title for Kaya.

== International career ==
=== Philippines ===
In July 2022, Menzi was called up to the senior team of the Philippines for the first time in a closed-doors friendly vs. Timor-Leste. He scored in the first half as the Philippines won 4–1. Later that year, he was included in the final squad for the 2022 AFF Championship, making his debut in a 1–0 loss to Vietnam. The Philippines would go on to finish fourth in their group.

He also played in a friendly against Kyrgyzstan on 15 October 2023 in Bahrain, scoring the only goal in a 0–1 win during the Philippines training camp ahead of the second round of the 2026 FIFA World Cup qualifiers.

=== International goals ===
Scores and results list the Philippines' goal tally first.

| # | Date | Venue | Opponent | Score | Result | Competition |
2022
| 1. | 16 July 2022 | Kapten I Wayan Dipta Stadium, Bali | Timor-Leste | 2–0 | 4–1 | Friendly |
2023
| 2. | 15 October 2023 | Al Muharraq Stadium, Arad | Kyrgyzstan | 0–1 | 0-1 | Friendly |

== Honours ==
Kaya–Iloilo

- Philippines Football League: 2022–23
- Copa Paulino Alcantara: 2018, 2021; runner-up: 2019, 2022
