= Marwin Angeles =

Italian footballer (born 1991)

- Angeles after playing for the Philippines against Afghanistan in 2023

Personal information
- Full name: Marwin Janver Malinay Angeles
- Date of birth: 9 January 1991 (age 35)
- Place of birth: Venice, Italy
- Height: 1.75 m (5 ft 9 in)
- Position: Midfielder

Team information
- Current team: One Taguig

Youth career
- 2008-2010: Edo Mestre
- 2010–2011: Venezia

Senior career*
Years	Team	Apps	(Gls)
2011–2012	Laos		
2012–2014	Global		
2014–2017	Ceres		
2017–2022	Kaya–Iloilo	62	(2)
2022	Persik Kediri	12	(0)
2022–2026	Kaya–Iloilo	59	(7)
2026–	One Taguig		

International career^{‡}
2012	Philippines U21	3	(0)
2012	Philippines U22	5	(0)
2011	Philippines U23	2	(0)
2012–	Philippines	27	(1)
- * Club domestic league appearances and goals as of 20:15, 21 February 2026 (UTC) ‡ National team caps and goals as of 16:05, 12 January 2022 (UTC)

Marwin Janver Malinay Angeles (born 9 January 1991) is a professional footballer who plays as a midfielder for Philippines Football League club One Taguig. Born in Italy, he plays for the Philippines national team.

Angeles represented the Philippines at the 2011 Southeast Asian Games and 2012 AFF Championship.

== Club career ==
Angeles started his youth career at Venezia, and eventually moved to the Philippines in August 2011 to play for Laos FC, currently playing in the United Football League Division 2. In March 2012, he and his twin brother moved to Global FC in the middle of the season. In March 2014 left his club Global FC and joined to Ceres F.C.

Angeles joined Kaya in 2017 for the first season of the Philippines Football League (PFL). On 26 June 2021, he became the first player from a Filipino club to score in the AFC Champions League proper—a consolation goal in their 4–1 loss to BG Pathum United.

== International career ==
In May 2011, he joined the national team training pool, and by September 2011 he was named in the provisional Philippines under-23 squad for the 2011 Southeast Asian Games. He made his first appearance as a substitute in the 3–2 win against Laos.

He was also part of the under-21 national team that participated in the 2012 Hassanal Bolkiah Trophy, making a debut in a 2–8 loss against Myanmar on 24 February 2012.

On 24 January 2012, he featured for the senior national team in a friendly match against Icheon Citizen FC, wherein he scored the equalizer to end the match 1–1 in regulation time, forcing a penalty shoot-out that eventually led them to a 2–4 loss. On 29 February 2012, he then made his first full international appearance as a substitute in the 1–1 draw against Malaysia. On 15 November 2012, he scored his full international goal for the Philippines resulting a 1–0 win over Singapore Lions.

=== International goals ===
Scores and results list the Philippines' goal tally first.

#	Date	Venue	Opponent	Score	Result	Competition
2012
1.	15 November 2012	Cebu City Sports Complex, Cebu City	Singapore	1–0	1–0	Friendly

== Personal life ==
Angeles was born to Filipino parents in Venice, Italy. He has a twin brother, Marvin Angeles, who is also a professional footballer who plays for Stallion Laguna and as well a Philippines international. He is currently on leave from studying for an Electronics Engineering degree at the Istituto Livio Sanudo while on national team duty.

== Honours ==
=== Club ===
Global

- UFL Division 1: 2012; Runner-up 2013

=== National team ===
- AFC Challenge Cup: Third 2012
- Philippine Peace Cup: 2013

== Career statistics ==
=== Club ===
As of 7 August 2022.

Club	Season	League			Cup		Continental		Total	
Club	Season	Division	Apps	Goals	Apps	Goals	Apps	Goals	Apps	Goals
Kaya–Iloilo	2017	PFL	25	2	–		–		25	2
Kaya–Iloilo	2018	PFL	12	0	6	0	–		18	0
Kaya–Iloilo	2019	PFL	20	0	3	1	6	1	29	2
Kaya–Iloilo	2020	PFL	5	0	–		3	0	8	0
Kaya–Iloilo	2021	PFL	–		4	0	6	1	10	1
Persik Kediri	2021–22	Liga 1	12	0	–		–		12	0
Kaya–Iloilo	2022–23	PFL	1	0	0	0	0	0	1	0
Career total			75	2	13	1	15	2	103	5
