= Ricardo Sendra =

Argentinian association football player

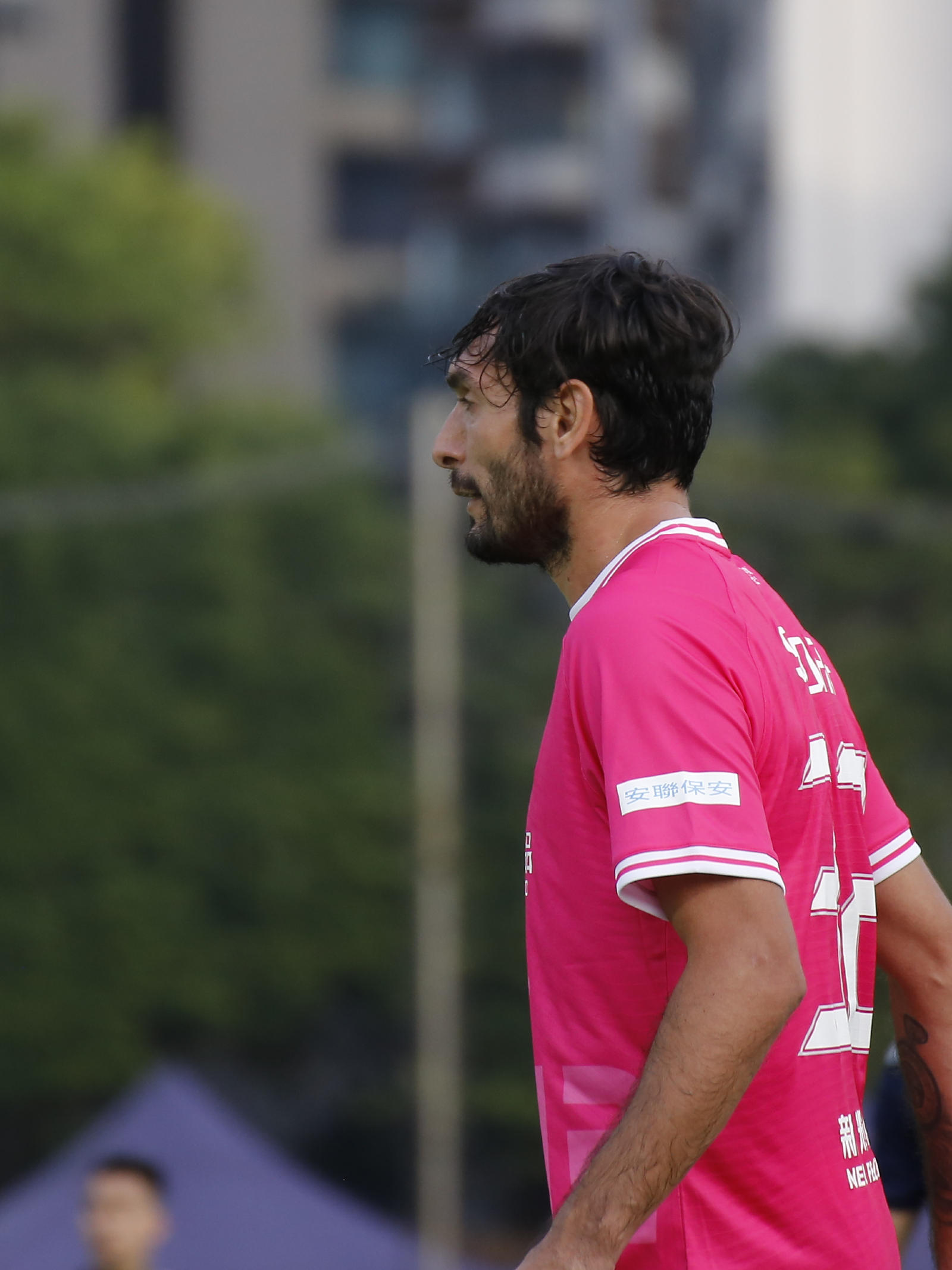

Personal information
- Full name: Ricardo Iván Sendra
- Date of birth: 4 October 1987 (age 39)
- Place of birth: Mar del Plata, Argentina
- Height: 1.78 m (5 ft 10 in)
- Positions: Midfielder; defender

Team information
- Current team: Stallion Laguna
- Number: 29

Senior career*
Years	Team	Apps	(Gls)
2014	Kimberley		
2015	Alvarado	21	(0)
2016	America de Piran		
2017	Geylang International	21	(4)
2018	Perseru Serui	5	(0)
2019–2020	Mendiola 1991	20	(3)
2020	Stallion Laguna	3	(0)
2021	Cebu		
2022	United City	6	(3)
2023	Resources Capital	10	(0)
2023	Kaya–Iloilo		
2024	United City	14	(13)
2024–	Stallion Laguna	7	(1)
- * Club domestic league appearances and goals as of 30 November 2024

Ricardo Iván Sendra (born 4 October 1987) is an Argentine professional footballer who plays as a midfielder for Philippines Football League club Stallion Laguna.

== Club career ==
=== Kimberley ===
In preparation of the 2014-15 Torneo Argentino B, Kimberley de Mar del Plata announced that they would sign Sendra; he left them some months later.

=== Alvarado ===
Club Atlético Alvarado signed 5 players, including Sendra, in February 2015 in a bid to bolster their squad.

=== Geylang International ===
Sendra was handed a trial with S.League side, Geylang International and played in a pre-season friendly against the Singapore U22. After signing for Geylang, he featured for them in friendlies in Malaysia and Thailand. He had a slow start to the season, making only one appearance in the Eagles' first four games due to a small injury. However, in Geylang's 5th game of the season, Sendra was handed his first start of the season. He finally completed his first competitive 90 minutes for the Eagles and injected much needed creativity in the final third in a 2–0 win over the Garena Young Lions.

=== Perseru Serui ===
Sendra decided not to continue with GeylangVInternational and decided to accept a lucrative offer from Indonesian Liga 1 club Perseru Serui. He only completed two months with the team and left after economic conditions were not satisfied by Perseru. As a consequence Ricardo could not sign for any other team in Indonesia and had to settle training with other players without a team for a few months until he accepted an offer to play again in Spain 3rd division team Inter Ibiza CD.

=== Mendiola ===
Sendra moved to the Philippines to play in the Philippines Football League, joining Mendiola.

=== Stallion Laguna ===
After a season with Mendiola, he joined Stallion Laguna.

=== Dynamic Herb Cebu ===
In 2021, Sendra joined newly-formed club Dynamic Herb Cebu. He made his debut for Cebu in a 1–0 against his former club, Stallion Laguna in the Copa Paulino Alcantara.

=== United City ===
In March 2022, Sendra signed for United City, seeking a chance of playing in the AFC Champions League.

=== Resources Capital ===
On 3 February 2023, Sendra signed for Resources Capital.

=== Kaya–IloIlo ===
On 9 August 2023, Sendra signed for Kaya–Iloilo . He scored a goal at his debut match with Kaya–Iloilo in a match against former Kaya rivals Loyola and scored 2 goals and winning a man of the match award after beating Don Bosco Garelli in a dominating 11-0 display win.

=== United City ===
On 12 March 2024, Sendra returned to United City.
