= Abou Sy =

Senegalese footballer (born 1996)

Personal information
- Full name: Abou Mouhamed Sy
- Date of birth: 2 February 1996 (age 30)
- Place of birth: Nioro du Rip, Senegal
- Height: 1.88 m (6 ft 2 in)
- Position: Striker

Team information
- Current team: Dynamic Herb Cebu
- Number: 77

Senior career*
| Years | Team | Apps | (Gls) |
| 2016–2018 | Jamono Fatick | | |
| 2018–2023 | Stallion Laguna | 63 | (22) |
| 2023–2024 | Kaya–Iloilo | 10 | (10) |
| 2024– | Dynamic Herb Cebu | 41 | (25) |
- * Club domestic league appearances and goals as of 11 March 2026

Abou Mouhamed Sy (born 2 February 1996) is a Senegalese professional footballer who plays as a striker for Philippines Football League club Cebu.

== Personal life ==
Sy was born in the city of Nioro du Rip in Senegal. At 20 years old, he played for first team of Senegalese Ligue 1 club Jamono Fatick.

== Club career ==
=== Stallion Laguna ===
In 2018, Sy went to the Philippines to trial for PFL club Stallion Laguna, where he made the cut for the first-team. He stayed with the club for 5 years until departing in 2023, leading the club to two third-place finishes in the Copa Paulino Alcantara and an AFC Cup spot in the PFL.

=== Kaya–Iloilo ===
Sy signed with 2022–23 PFL champions Kaya–Iloilo in the offseason as a foreign reinforcement for the club's 2023–24 AFC Champions League campaign. In the 2023 edition of the Copa Paulino Alcantara, he won the golden boot by scoring 10 goals in 10 matches and was in the starting XI that won the title.

=== Cebu ===
In early 2024, Kaya announced Sy's departure from the club, having been with them for only half a season. Sy signed with another PFL side, Dynamic Herb Cebu.
