= Justin Baas =

Filipino footballer (born 2000)

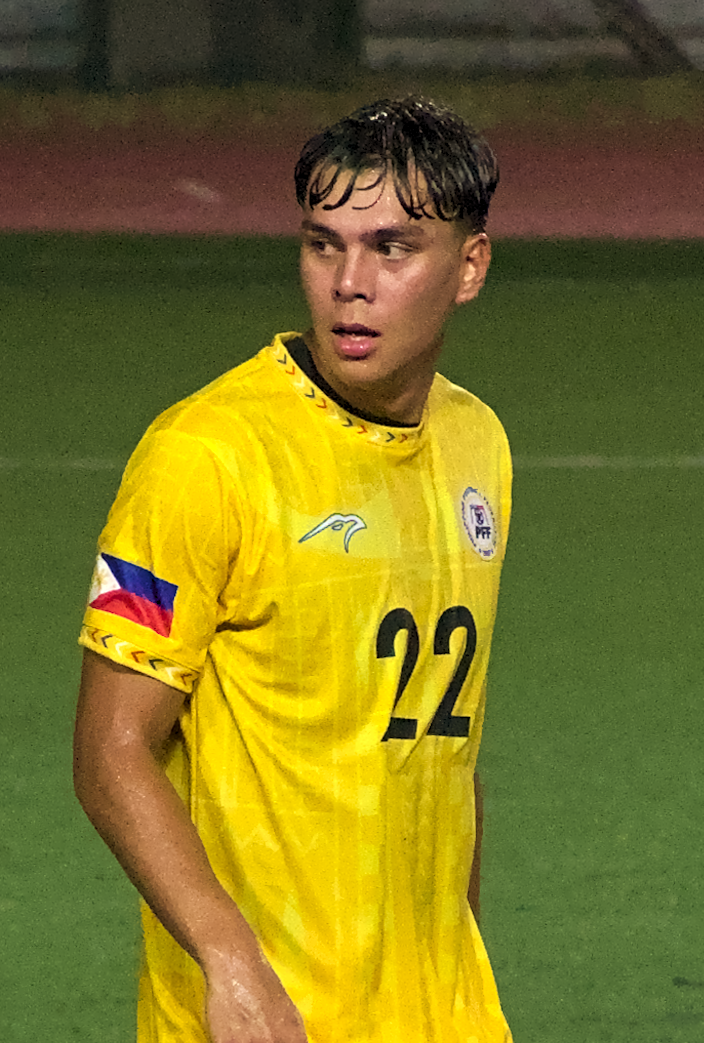
- Baas playing for Philippines in 2023

Personal information
- Full name: Mikel Justin Cagurangan Baas
- Date of birth: 16 March 2000 (age 26)
- Place of birth: Quezon City, Philippines
- Height: 1.85 m (6 ft 1 in)
- Position: Midfielder

Team information
- Current team: Manila Digger
- Number: 70

Youth career
- –2012: Always Forward
- 2012–2016: Volendam
- 2016–2017: Always Forward
- 2017–2019: AZ

Senior career*
Years	Team	Apps	(Gls)
2018–2020	Jong AZ	5	(0)
2020–2021	Ratchaburi Mitr Phol	7	(0)
2021–2022	United City	5	(0)
2022	Melaka United	14	(2)
2023–2024	Kaya–Iloilo	7	(2)
2024–2025	Uthai Thani	24	(1)
2025	Melaka	3	(0)
2026–	Manila Digger	2	(0)

International career^{‡}
2014	Netherlands U15	3	(1)
2019–2022	Philippines U23	7	(1)
2019–	Philippines	17	(0)
- * Club domestic league appearances and goals as of 6:18; 11 March 2026 (UTC) ‡ National team caps and goals as of 22:00; 26 March 2024 (UTC)

Mikel Justin Cagurangan Baas (Dutch pronunciation: [baːs]; born 16 March 2000) is a Filipino professional footballer who plays as a midfielder for Philippines Football League club Manila Digger and the Philippines national team.

== Club career ==
=== Youth ===
Raised in Netherlands, Baas had his youth career at Always Forward, Volendam, and AZ.

=== Jong AZ ===
During the 2018–19 season, Baas was promoted to the B-team of AZ. Baas made his debut with Jong AZ as a substitute, replacing Léon Bergsma at the 90th minute of the match in a 1–2 away victory against TOP Oss.

=== Ratchaburi Mitr Phol ===
In September 2020, Baas joined Ratchaburi Mitr Phol, during the middle of the 2020 Thai League 1 season which was temporarily suspended due to the COVID-19 pandemic. He signed a three-year contract with the club.

== International career ==
Baas was born in the Philippines and raised in the Netherlands to a Dutch father and a Filipino mother, making him eligible to play for Netherlands or the Philippines. He initially chose the Netherlands as he was a U-15 national team member, playing a total of 3 games and scoring 1 goal.

=== Philippines U-22 Olympic ===
Baas was part of the Philippines U-22 Olympic squad that competed in the 2019 Southeast Asian Games held in the Philippines. On the second group match on 27 November, he scored the Philippines' only goal in a 2–1 loss to Myanmar.

=== Philippines ===
Baas received his first call-up for the Philippines senior team in August 2019 when he was named in the squad for the 2022 FIFA World Cup qualifiers against Syria and Guam. On 10 September, the 19-year-old Baas made his senior debut in a 4–1 away win against the latter.

== Honors ==
Manila Digger

- Philippines Football League: 2025–26
