= Troy Limbo =

Filipino footballer

Personal information
- Full name: Dimitri Lionel Uy Limbo
- Date of birth: 17 November 1998 (age 27)
- Place of birth: Cagayan de Oro, Philippines
- Height: 1.70 m (5 ft 7 in)
- Position: Midfielder

Team information
- Current team: Manila Digger
- Number: 98

Youth career
- Rosevale School
- Abbas Orchard School
- 2011: Little Azkals
- La Salle Green Hills
- 2015: Kaya
- 2016–2017: Chesterfield

College career
Years	Team	Apps	(Gls)
2017–2019	Sunderland College		

Senior career*
Years	Team	Apps	(Gls)
2018–2019	Sunderland RCA		
2020–2022	ADT	8	(0)
2022–2023	Stallion Laguna	21	(0)
2023–2024	Davao Aguilas	5	(3)
2024	United City	14	(4)
2024–2025	Davao Aguilas	17	(2)
2025–	Manila Digger	12	(0)

International career
2015	Philippines U19	7	(0)
2017–2019	Philippines U23	13	(0)
- * Club domestic league appearances and goals as of 22 August 2024

Dimitri Lionel "Troy" Uy Limbo (born 17 November 1998) is a Filipino professional footballer who plays as a midfielder for Philippines Football League club Manila Digger. He represented the Philippines at youth level.

== Early career ==
=== Youth ===
Limbo first started playing football at the age of six at the Rosevale School in his native Philippines. He played for the Little Azkals team in 2011, having left the Rosevale School for the Abbas Orchard School. After studying at La Salle Green Hills, and playing for Kaya in 2015, Limbo moved to England to pursue a football career.

Having not been able to find any clubs to go on trial with, he signed with a local team in Stamford, before being scouted by League One side Chesterfield. He signed a 12-month contract in 2016.

=== College ===
Prior to returning to the Philippines, Limbo studied at Sunderland College, playing for their football team. During his time at the college, he was called up to the Philippines national under-23 side.

== Club career ==
=== Sunderland RCA ===
During his time in England, he also played for Sunderland RCA.

=== Azkals Development Team ===
In 2020, Limbo joined Philippines Football League club Azkals Development Team. He made his league debut for the club in a 0–1 defeat against his former club Kaya–Iloilo.

=== Stallion Laguna ===
In March 2022, he joined Stallion Laguna.

=== Davao ===
He is part of the Davao Aguilas squad for the 2023 Copa Paulino Alcantara season.

== International career ==
=== Philippines U19 ===
In 2015, Limbo was called up to the Philippines U19 team for the 2015 AFF U-19 Youth Championship held at Laos National Stadium, Vientiane, Laos. He made his debut for Philippines U-19 in a 1−2 win against Brunei U19.

=== Philippines U22/U23 ===
In 2017, Limbo received his first call up to the Philippines U22 team for the 2017 Southeast Asian Games in Malaysia. He made his debut for Philippines U22 in a 0−2 win against Cambodia U22.

== Career statistics ==
=== Club ===
As of 17 September 2023.

Club	Season	League			Cup		Continental		Other		Total	
Club	Season	Division	Apps	Goals	Apps	Goals	Apps	Goals	Apps	Goals	Apps	Goals
ADT	2020	PFL	4	0	–		–		0	0	4	0
ADT	2021	PFL	–		4	0	–		0	0	4	0
Stallion Laguna	2022–2023	PFL	13	0	8	0	–		0	0	21	0
Davao Aguilas	2023	–			5	3	–		0	0	4	2
Career total			17	0	17	3	0	0	0	0	34	3

== Honors ==
Manila Digger

- Philippines Football League: 2025–26
