= Arnel Amita =

Filipino footballer (born 1995)

Personal information
- Full name: Arnel Abuloc Amita
- Date of birth: 10 January 1995 (age 31)
- Place of birth: Davao de Oro, Philippines
- Height: 1.60 m (5 ft 3 in)
- Position: Midfielder

Team information
- Current team: One Taguig
- Number: 22

Senior career*
Years	Team	Apps	(Gls)
2014	Loyola Meralco Sparks F.C.		
2014-2015	Manila Jeepney		
2015–2016	Manila Jeepney		
2016–2017	Loyola Meralco Sparks F.C.	1	
2018–2024	Kaya–Iloilo	40	(3)
2024–2025	One Taguig	27	(8)
2025–	Aguilas–UMak	10	(0)

International career
- Philippines U23
2022–	Philippines	4	(0)
- * Club domestic league appearances and goals

Arnel Abuloc Amita (born 10 January 1995) is a Filipino professional footballer who plays as a midfielder for Philippines Football League club Aguilas–UMak and the Philippine national team.

== Club career ==
=== Loyola Meralco Sparks ===
In 2014, he joined the Loyola Meralco Sparks of the United Football League in a short stint. He returned to Loyola in 2016.

=== Manila Jeepney ===
Amita transferred to Manila Jeepney until January 2015, He then joined again in April 2015 until January 2016 before returning to loyola.

=== Kaya FC ===
In July 2018, Amita joined Philippines Football League club Kaya FC. He left Kaya after 6 years.

=== One Taguig ===
In 2024, Amita joined the newly formed One Taguig FC for the 2024 Philippines Football League.

== International career ==
Amita was called up for the Philippine team in 2022, He debuted in a 4-1 Friendly match against Timor-Leste.

Amita was included in the Philippines squad for 2022 AFF Championship.

== Honours ==
Kaya FC

- Philippine Football League
  Champion: 2022–23
  Runner up: 2019, 2020
- Copa Paulino Alcantara
  Champion: 2023
  Runner up: 2019, 2022
