= Azkals Development Club =

Filipino association football club

- Azkals Development Team 2020 logo
- Full name: Azkals Development Team (2020)
- Short name: ADC
- Founded: 2020; 6 years ago
- Ground: PFF National Training Center
- Capacity: 1,000
- Owner: Philippine Football Federation
- League: Philippines Football League
Home colours	Away colours	Third colours

The Azkals Development Club, commonly referred to as ADC, is a Philippine developmental football and futsal club that competes in the Philippines Football League.

Founded in 2020, the team was named the Azkals Development Team and is under the jurisdiction of the Philippine Football Federation (PFF), while being managed similar to a professional club. Most of the club's players are members of the Philippines' youth national teams. The team has a youth academy, called the Azkals Development Academy (ADA).

== History ==
As preparation for the 2019 Southeast Asian Games in the Philippines, the Philippine Football Federation decided to let the Philippines U-22 team, composed of players such as Yrick Gallantes, Chima Uzoka, and Elias Mordal compete against the clubs of the Philippines Football League in the 2019 Copa Paulino Alcantara. The team won their first match, 1–0, against Green Archers United, but ultimately finished 3rd and failed to qualify for the semifinals. In the aftermath of the team's success at the SEA Games, it was reported that there were plans to have the national youth team participate in the 2020 season of the Philippines Football League (PFL) as a guest team. However, such plans were dropped and reportedly a full-fledged professional club under the name "Azkals Development Team" would enter the league instead. The formation of the club is an initiative of the National Teams Committee of the Philippine Football Federation. The coaching staff of the Philippine senior national team will be involved with ADT with Scott Cooper as head coach.

The ADT was formed after it was observed that other countries participating in the games already had many players participating in professional leagues while Filipino players of the same age still involved in collegiate football. The development team is intended give "professional club environment" exposure to mainly youth players as well as select overage players from the senior national team such as individuals who recently recovered from an injury. According to national team manager Dan Palami, ADT is a platform to develop "homegrown" players for the national team.

=== Philippines Football League ===
==== 2020 season ====
By January 2020, the club had begun signing its first set of players. ADT played their first friendly match against Philippine Army on March 5, 2020, as part of Philippine Army's 123rd founding anniversary. ADT won 6–0. ADT's debut in the PFL was delayed due to the COVID-19 pandemic. The pandemic forced the postponement of the 2020 PFL season. In preparation for the possible resumption of the season, ADT's players went to Balesin Island in September 2020. While by this time the government through Games and Amusements Board and the Inter-Agency Task Force for the Management of Emerging Infectious Diseases has allowed PFL teams to conduct team trainings, ADT's status as a guest team and non-professional side of the PFL meant that it had to secure a separate permission from the government.

The club participated in the 2020 PFL season that was postponed due to the COVID-19 Pandemic, boasting a roster with former PFL and UAAP players such as Jarvey Gayoso, Mar Diano, Marvin Angeles, and Mathew Custodio. ADT played their first-ever PFL match on October 28, 2020, at the PFF National Training Center, where they lost to defending champions United City, 1–0. On their third match of the season, on November 3, they clinched their first-ever PFL win, 2–0 over Mendiola. Jarvey Gayoso scored the team's first-ever PFL goal. The club ended up winning the next 3 games to secure 3rd place overall.

==== 2021 season ====
In 2021, the club brought in many new faces as well as let go of old players to other league clubs, in keeping with the club's values. The club's biggest departures were Jarvey Gayoso, who went to Kaya–Iloilo, Anthony Pinthus, who transferred to United City, and Chima Uzoka, who went to Stallion Laguna, The club brought in Oskari Kekkonen and Sandro Reyes, two prospects who had played for the Philippines U23 team. On the team's list were Mark Winhoffer, Lloyd Fagerlie, Niko de Vera, and Mark Swainston, although none of them played a match for the club. The club participated in the 2021 Copa Paulino Alcantara due to the cancellation of the 2021 PFL season. In the group stage they thrashed Mendiola 1991 9–0, their biggest-ever victory, and narrowly won 2–1 in the semifinals against Stallion, setting up a final with Kaya-Iloilo, where they lost 1–0. A number of their players would go on to play in the 2020 AFF Championship later that year.

==== 2022–23 season ====
During the club's 2022 preseason, the team let go of many of its players who were vital in last season's cup run. Mathew Custodio and Ivan Ouano went to United City, Sandro Reyes, Oskari Kekkonen, Mar Diano, and Quincy Kammeraad departed for Kaya, Troy Limbo and Kainoa Bailey went to Stallion Laguna, while Christian Rontini became the first player of the club to transfer overseas, going to Penang in the Malaysia Super League. The new-look club, as preparation for the 2022 Southeast Asian Games, participated in the 2022 Copa Paulino Alcantara, bringing in reinforcements such as Scott Woods, Jaime Rosquillo, and Mateo Alegre, as well as hiring experienced coach and former Azkal Norman Fegidero. The club ended up with two wins, one draw, and three loses, finishing fourth but having to forfeit their semifinal slot due to their commitments in the ASEAN competition. After the SEA Games, Philippine National Team veteran Stephan Schröck was brought in and the club saw another overhaul, letting go most of its oldest players and bringing in majority of the Philippine U-19 National Team. With Schrock maintaining a playing coach role and acting as captain, the club impressed despite the players' young ages. The ADT finished fourth in the mid-season table, with a number of their players playing in the 2022 AFF Championship.

On 23 May 2023, ADT announced its withdrawal from the PFL, forfeiting its remaining games in the season due to unspecified "recent events", although it has committed to continue its Azkals Development Academy.

==== 2026–27 season ====
On 27 August 2026, ADC will rejoin the PFL with their first game on 6 September 2026.

== Youth academy ==
Azkals Development Academy
- Short name: ADA
- Founded: 2023; 3 years ago
- League: PFF Futsaliga (Azkals Development Club); High 5 Futsal League (CF Manila partnership)
- CEO: Stephan Schröck
- Parent group: Azkals Development Team

The formation of the Azkals Development Academy (ADA), which is associated with ADT, was first announced in November 2022 by Stephan Schröck. The academy was launched by May 2023.

It remains operational following ADT's withdrawal from the 2022–23 PFL season. The academy was set to send a team in the 2023 Copa Paulino Alcantara. However, a new club CF Manila entered the Copa from the core of ADA players.

== Futsal ==
The ADT competed as the Azkals Development Club (ADC) for both the men's and women's open divisions of the inaugural 2026 PFF Futsaliga.

== Players ==
As of 16 September 2026

Note: Flags indicate national team as defined under FIFA eligibility rules; some limited exceptions apply. Players may hold more than one non-FIFA nationality.

No.	Pos.	Nation	Player
1	GK	PHI	Joshua Jalog
3	DF	CMR	Franck Behema
6	FW	USA	Gautam Kollabathula
7	MF	BRA	Victor Luis
8	MF	JPN	Kotaro Terasaka
9	FW	PHI	MJ Libre
10	FW	PHI	Mark Unabia
11	FW	PHI	Erman Mangano
12	GK	PHI	Hayeson Pepito
13	DF	MAR	Salaheddine Lachhab
14	MF	PHI	Charles Unabia
15	DF	PLE	Ahmed Hassan Al-Arqan
17	MF	PHI	Stephan Schröck (Captain)
19	FW	PHI	Gab Abo
20	DF	NGR	Ilemona Usman

No.	Pos.	Nation	Player
21	MF	CAN	Benaiah Tesfaye
22	FW	PHI	Earl Piñero
25	DF	GHA	David Yeboah
26	FW	USA	Josue Baraka
27	MF	PHI	Christian Vendiola
33	MF	PHI	Julian Romero
40	DF	SEN	Alassane Wade
44	MF	IRI	Milad Behgandom
58	GK	USA	Aidan Hay
73	FW	GHA	Robert Quaye
80	FW	CIV	Ousmane Sidibé
90	FW	ESP	Hasdriell Torres
97	MF	MAR	Abdelhamid Lachhab
99	MF	MAR	Mohamed Arammaz

== Head coaches ==
Name	Year(s)
(Republic of Ireland) Scott Cooper	2020–2021
(Philippines) Jovanie Villagracia	2021
(Philippines) Norman Fegidero	2022
(Philippines) Jovanie Villagracia	2022
(Philippines) Stephan Schröck	2023
(Philippines) Jovanie Villagracia	2023
(Philippines) Ernani Regis	2026-

== Honors ==
- Copa Paulino Alcantara
  - Runners-up: 2021

== See also ==
- Young Lions
