= Copa Paulino Alcantara =

Football tournament for clubs in the Philippines

- Organiser(s): Philippine Football Federation
- Founded: March 2018; 8 years ago
- Region: Philippines
- Teams: Various
- Current champions: Kaya–Iloilo (3rd title)
- Most championships: Kaya–Iloilo (3 titles)
- Broadcaster(s): PFL (Facebook and YouTube live stream)

The Copa Paulino Alcantara, also known as the PFL Cup, is a football tournament in the Philippines, organized by the Philippine Football Federation (PFF). It is contested by the clubs of the Philippines Football League (PFL), along with guest clubs. Participating clubs play in a round-robin group stage followed by a knockout phase and concluded by a final. Until 2023, winners would qualify for the following season's AFC Champions League qualifying play-offs preliminary round; failure to advance to the AFC Champions League group stage would have transferred them to the AFC Cup.

The cup's first edition was held in 2018. It was established as the country's domestic cup and is named after Paulino Alcántara, a Filipino-Spanish footballer who notably played in the 1910s–20s for FC Barcelona as well as the Philippines and Spain national teams.

The most successful club is Kaya–Iloilo with three titles, followed by United City with two. Kaya–Iloilo are the current champions, defeating the Davao Aguilas in the 2023 final. Kaya–Iloilo have also appeared in every final since the cup's inaugural edition.

== History ==
=== Background and planning ===
Following the Philippines national team's best record so far in the 2010 AFF Championship, football in the Philippines experienced a renaissance. However, the country had no true national league nor a cup competition (the national cup competition was last held in 2007, to celebrate the Philippine Football Federation's centennial). To help address this issue, Smart Communications in January 2011, approached the PFF with an offer to finance a new local football competition. The proposed partnership was set to last 10 years, with Smart releasing ₱80 million in funds with the aim of providing more playing opportunities for skilled football players, and the eventual creation of a national league. Newly installed PFF president Mariano Araneta subsequently approved the proposal. In March 2011, the new tournament commenced under the name PFF–Smart National Men's Club Championship. However, the competition only lasted for four years, with the last edition being held in 2014–15.

After the PFF announced the creation of a new national league, the federation confirmed that a new domestic cup competition was also to be formed. The proposed competition was tentatively named as the PFL Cup, but was ultimately changed into "Copa Paulino Alcantara" in March 2018, in commemoration of the FC Barcelona legend Paulino Alcántara who also represented the Philippines national team. It was planned that the cup will be held simultaneously with the Philippines Football League (PFL) regular season. However, in the PFL's inaugural season in 2017, the cup was not played. Instead, a playoff for the top teams of the regular season, called the Finals Series, was held in its place. Ceres–Negros won the only edition of the Finals Series.

=== 2018 inaugural edition ===
During the 2018 PFL season, the league announced in February that the cup competition will proceed, but instead of taking place in the middle of the regular season, it was set to be held after it.

On July 15, 2018 during the PFL Fans Day, it was announced that non-franchise clubs were eligible to join the Copa Paulino Alcantara, provided they satisfy the licensing requirements. However, no non-PFL club joined the inaugural edition. The first Copa Paulino Alcantara was held on September and October 2018. The six PFL clubs were divided into two groups that played each other in a double round-robin format. The top two teams from each group faced off in the single-elimination semi-finals, followed by the final. The winners then qualify for the following year's AFC Cup.

The first Copa Paulino Alcantara match took place on September 1, 2018 at the Rizal Memorial Stadium. Kaya–Iloilo defeated Global Cebu 4–0, wherein Robert Lopez Mendy scored the tournament's first-ever goal and hat-trick. In the final on October 27, Kaya–Iloilo defeated Davao Aguilas 1–0 in extra time through a last-minute goal by Jovin Bedic.

=== 2019–present ===
In 2019, when the Philippine Premier League was launched to supplant the PFL, it was announced that the Copa Paulino Alcantara would be retained. However, the PPL was short-lived and PFL was relaunched within the year. The 2019 Copa Paulino Alcantara featured the first guest team, Philippines U22, who were preparing for the upcoming 2019 Southeast Asian Games. The 2020 edition was cancelled due to the COVID-19 pandemic, while the 2021 edition was held in a bio-secure bubble at the PFF National Training Center. It was also the first edition to feature the third place playoff. In the 2022 edition, instead of being divided into groups, all participating clubs played a single-round robin elimination round wherein the top four clubs advanced to the semi-finals.

The 2023 edition features 17 teams (5 from the PFL and 12 guests)—the most to date in the competition's history. It is also the first to feature more than two groups in the group stage, and the first to hold quarter-finals.

== Branding ==
The Copa Paulino Alcantara logo was chosen from a design competition organized by Liga Futbol Inc. in May 2018. On July 27, 2018, the winning logo was announced as the one designed by Joel Alejo, which was chosen from more than 150 entries.

== Format ==
Clubs from the Philippines Football League (PFL), along with invited guest clubs, are qualified for the Copa Paulino Alcantara. The format consists of a round-robin group stage followed by a knockout phase leading to the final.

As of the 2023 edition, the tournament begins with a group stage wherein clubs are drawn into three groups with five or six clubs each. The group stage consists of a single round-robin format. The top two teams from each group along with the two best third-placed teams advance to the quarter-finals. The semi-finals are played in a two-legged format; the losing semi-finalists play the third-place match, while the winning semi-finalists face-off in the final.

The Copa Paulino Alcantara has always consisted of a round-robin phase followed by a knockout phase. The number of teams participating has varied over the years causing minor adjustments in the tournament format. Most of the group stages held featured two groups, with the top two teams of each group advancing to the semi-finals. The 2022 edition is the only one to date that did not distribute teams into groups; instead they all played each other in a single round-robin format with the top four advancing to the semi-finals. The inaugural edition was the only one to feature a double round-robin group stage; all subsequent editions used a single round-robin format in the group stage. The third place play-off was introduced in 2021, while the quarter-finals and two-legged semi-finals were introduced in 2023.

=== Schedule ===
The Copa Paulino Alcantara is usually held after its respective PFL season. The first three editions were held within the months of September, October, and November. Following the PFL's adoption of an inter-year calendar in 2022–23 to coincide with international competitions, the Copa Paulino Alcantara's schedule was adjusted; the fourth edition was held from March to May 2022 while the fifth edition started in July 2023.

== Qualification for Asian competitions ==
From its launch in 2018 until 2020, the winners of the Copa Paulino Alcantara qualified for the following season's AFC Cup group stage. From 2021 onwards, Copa Paulino Alcantara winners qualify for the preliminary round of following season's AFC Champions League qualifying play-offs. If they qualify for the AFC Champions League group stage, they have to renounce to their berth in the AFC Cup. Conversely, failure to qualify for the former tournament transfers them to the AFC Cup group stage.

== Results ==
Keys

- aet: result/match won after extra time
- pen: match won after penalty shoot-out
- TBD: to be determined

Ed.	Year	Final			Third-place play-off			No. of teams
Ed.	Year	Champion	Score	Runner-up	Third	Score	Fourth	No. of teams
1	2018	Kaya–Iloilo	1–0 (a.e.t.); Rizal Memorial Stadium, Manila	Davao Aguilas	Not yet introduced			6
2	2019	Ceres–Negros^{1}	2–1; Biñan Football Stadium, Biñan	Kaya–Iloilo	Not yet introduced			7
–	2020	Cancelled due to the COVID-19 pandemic						
3	2021	Kaya–Iloilo	1–0; PFF National Training Center, Carmona	Azkals Development Team	Stallion Laguna	0–0 (a.e.t.) (5–4 p); PFF National Training Center, Carmona	Dynamic Herb Cebu	5
4	2022	United City	3–2; PFF National Training Center, Carmona	Kaya–Iloilo	Stallion Laguna	2–1; PFF National Training Center, Carmona	Dynamic Herb Cebu	7
5	2023	Kaya–Iloilo	1–1 (4–3 pen.); Rizal Memorial Stadium, Manila	Davao Aguilas	Not held			17

Notes

1. United City were known as Ceres–Negros until 2020

=== Performance by club ===
Club	Winners	Runners-up	Winning Years
Kaya–Iloilo	3	2	2018, 2021, 2023
United City	2	0	2019, 2022
Davao Aguilas	0	2	–
ADT	0	1	–

== Awards ==
Starting from the second edition (2019) the Copa Paulino Alcantara introduced the following post-tournament awards: the Golden Ball for best player, the Golden Boot for top goalscorer, and the Golden Glove for best goalkeeper.

Note: Flags indicate nationality as defined under FIFA eligibility rules. Players may hold more than one non-FIFA nationality.

Year	Golden Ball	Golden Boot	Goals	Golden Glove
2019	(Japan) Takashi Odawara; Ceres–Negros	(Senegal) Robert Lopez Mendy; Ceres–Negros	5	(Philippines) Roland Müller; Ceres–Negros
2021	(Philippines) Jovin Bedic; Kaya–Iloilo	(Philippines) Jarvey Gayoso; Azkals Development Team	6	(Philippines) Louie Casas; Kaya–Iloilo
2022	(Philippines) Mike Ott; United City	(Japan) Daizo Horikoshi; Kaya–Iloilo	6	(Philippines) Anthony Pinthus; United City
2023	(Japan) Daizo Horikoshi; Kaya–Iloilo	(Senegal) Abou Sy; Kaya–Iloilo	10	(Philippines) Quincy Kammeraad; Kaya–Iloilo

== Media coverage ==
The Copa Paulino Alcantara has been livestreamed on Facebook, from the first matches of the 2018 edition. In addition, the inaugural final was broadcast live by ESPN5 on AksyonTV, as well as on YouTube. In the 2021 edition, One Sports covered the whole tournament, while One Sports and Pilipinas Live also covered the 2023 final.

== See also ==
- PFF National Men's Club Championship
- Football in the Philippines
