= 2024 United City F.C. season =

United City
2024 season
- Owner: United City Football Company Inc.
- Chairperson: Esti Lestari
- Head Coach: Marian Mihail (Until 1 May); Ramon Tribulietx (From 1 May)
- Stadium: Rizal Memorial Stadium
- Philippines Football League: 6th of 15
- All statistics correct as of March 28, 2024.

The 2024 season will be United City's 3rd season in both the Philippines Football League and Copa Paulino Alcantara, and 7th overall as a club. The club would make a return to the Philippines after abstaining from the 2023 Copa Paulino Alcantara.

The club were previously competing in the 2022–23 season of the PFL, but suddenly withdrew from the league having been in third place due to financial issues with one of the club's investors, Riau Capital Live. The club subsequently abstained from participating in the 2023 Copa Paulino Alcantara. In late 2023, however, the club announced their return to the league benchmarked by a new managerial staff, including chairman Esti Lestari and manager Maya Montecillo. Joan Esteva, who left after the club's withdrawal, was replaced by Romanian manager Marian Mihail. Several players who were part of the club before withdrawal such as Ivan Ouano, Ricardo Sendra, Curt Dizon, and Mark Hartmann rejoined, as well as a string of foreigners like John Kamara, Ariel Ngueukam, and PFL veteran Serge Kaole. The club also promoted two players from its Central Luzon-based academy.

== Squad ==
As of 28 March 2024

Squad No.	Name	Nationality	Date of birth (age)	Previous club
Goalkeepers
1	Matt Silva (captain)	(Canada) (Portugal)	28 March 1991 (age 35)	(Portugal) Espinho
3	Alvin Rebadulla	(Philippines)	22 July 2002 (age 24)	(Philippines) CF Manila
29	Henri Bandeken	(Cameroon)	14 February 1990 (age 36)	(Philippines) Kaya–Iloilo
88	Aries Palabrica	(Philippines)	29 June 2003 (age 23)	(Philippines) United City Academy
Defenders
5	Koffi Bini	(Ivory Coast)	10 December 2001 (age 24)	(Oman) Al-Rustaq
12	Miguel Clarino	(Philippines)	1 February 1997 (age 29)	(Thailand) Customs United
13	James Sunday	(Cameroon)	21 August 2000 (age 26)	(Equatorial Guinea) Malabo United
21	Jericho Delos Reyes	(Philippines)	9 July 1999 (age 27)	(Philippines) United City Academy
22	Zachary Taningco	(Philippines)	8 October 2004 (age 21)	(Philippines) Azkals Development Team
32	Nurhidayat	(Indonesia)	5 April 1999 (age 27)	(Indonesia) Persiraja Banda Aceh
44	Michael Menzi	(Philippines)	14 May 1993 (age 33)	(Philippines) Stallion Laguna
99	Pete Forrosuelo	(Philippines)	6 July 1999 (age 27)	(Philippines) Davao Aguilas
Midfielders
6	John Kamara	(Sierra Leone)	5 December 1988 (age 37)	(Greece) Egaleo
7	Darlton Digha	(Cameroon)	9 April 1998 (age 28)	(Philippines) Adamson University
8	Ricardo Sendra (vice-captain)	(Argentina)	4 October 1987 (age 38)	(Philippines) Kaya–Iloilo
11	Marvin Angeles	(Philippines) (Italy)	9 January 1991 (age 35)	(Philippines) Davao Aguilas
19	Serge Kaole	(Cameroon)	17 June 1990 (age 36)	(Philippines) Davao Aguilas
39	Paolo Bugas	(Philippines)	22 October 1994 (age 31)	(Philippines) Davao Aguilas
66	Diego Aspiras	(Philippines)	28 May 2004 (age 22)	(Philippines) Stallion Laguna Academy
98	Troy Limbo	(Philippines)	17 November 1998 (age 27)	(Philippines) Davao Aguilas
Forwards
10	Mark Hartmann	(Philippines) (England)	20 January 1992 (age 34)	(Thailand) Nakhon Si United
17	Ivan Ouano	(Philippines)	6 March 2000 (age 26)	(Philippines) Dynamic Herb Cebu
20	Curt Dizon	(Philippines) (England)	4 February 1994 (age 32)	(Philippines) Kaya–Iloilo
24	Jemar Andrade	(Philippines)	10 July 2004 (age 22)	(Philippines) CF Manila
25	Chester Pabualan	(Philippines)	29 April 1999 (age 27)	(Philippines) Philippine Air Force
77	Ariel Ngueukam	(Cameroon)	15 November 1988 (age 37)	(Sweden) IFK Mariehamn

== Transfers ==
Note: Flags indicate national team as defined under FIFA eligibility rules. Players may hold more than one non-FIFA nationality.

=== In ===
Date	Pos.	Nat.	Name	From	Ref.
Pre-season
February 26	MF	(Philippines)	Paolo Bugas	(Philippines) Davao Aguilas	
February 26	DF	(Philippines)	Pete Forrosuelo	(Philippines) Davao Aguilas	
February 28	GK	(Philippines)	Alvin Rebadulla	(Philippines) CF Manila	
February 28	FW	(Philippines)	Ivan Ouano	(Philippines) Dynamic Herb Cebu	
February 28	MF	(Philippines)	Troy Limbo	(Philippines) Davao Aguilas	
February 28	MF	(Cameroon)	Serge Kaole	(Philippines) Davao Aguilas	
February 28	DF	(Philippines)	Jericho Delos Reyes	(Philippines) United City Academy	
March 1	DF	(Philippines)	Michael Menzi	(Philippines) Stallion Laguna	
March 1	FW	(Philippines)	Jemar Andrade	(Philippines) CF Manila	
March 1	GK	(Cameroon)	Henri Bandeken	(Philippines) Kaya–Iloilo	
March 1	FW	(Philippines)	Curt Dizon	(Philippines) Kaya–Iloilo	
March 5	FW	(Philippines)	Chester Pabualan	(Philippines) Philippine Air Force	
March 5	GK	(Philippines)	Aries Palabrica	(Philippines) United City Academy	
March 5	MF	(Cameroon)	Darlton Digha	(Philippines) Adamson University	
March 7	MF	(Philippines)	Marvin Angeles	(Philippines) Davao Aguilas	
March 7	DF	(Philippines)	Miguel Clarino	(Thailand) Customs United	
March 7	DF	(Cameroon)	James Sunday	(Equatorial Guinea) Malabo United	
March 7	MF	(Philippines)	Diego Aspiras	(Philippines) Stallion Laguna Academy	
March 12	FW	(Philippines)	Mark Hartmann	(Thailand) Nakhon Si United	
March 12	GK	(Canada)	Matt Silva	(Portugal) Espinho	
March 12	MF	(Argentina)	Ricardo Sendra	(Philippines) Kaya–Iloilo	
March 12	DF	(Philippines)	Zachary Taningco	(Philippines) Azkals Development Team	
March 14	DF	(Ivory Coast)	Koffi Bini	(Oman) Al-Rustaq	
March 15	FW	(Cameroon)	Ariel Ngueukam	(Sweden) IFK Mariehamn	
March 21	MF	(Sierra Leone)	John Kamara	(Greece) Egaleo	
March 24	DF	(Indonesia)	Nurhidayat	(Indonesia) Persiraja Banda Aceh	

== Preseason and friendlies ==
Win Draw Loss

=== Friendlies ===
March 15, 2024 Friendly	Manila Digger	0–1	United City	Manila
				Stadium: Rizal Memorial Stadium

March 20, 2024 Friendly	Taguig	0–2	United City	Manila
			Hartmann; Sendra	Stadium: Rizal Memorial Stadium

March 27, 2024 Friendly	United City	1–2	Stallion Laguna	Manila
			McDaniel	Stadium: Rizal Memorial Stadium

June 26, 2024 Friendly	Philippines U19	1–6	United City	Manila
	Bisong		Ngueukam; Dizon; Taningco; Sendra; Ouano	Stadium: Rizal Memorial Stadium

== Competitions ==
=== Overview ===
Competition	First match	Last match	Starting round	Final position	Record							
Competition	First match	Last match	Starting round	Final position	Pld	W	D	L	GF	GA	GD	Win %
Philippines Football League	April 7, 2024	July 13, 2024	Matchday 1	TBD	13	8	3	2	42	11	+31	61.54
Total					13	8	3	2	42	11	+31	61.54

Last updated: July 4, 2024
Source: Competitions

=== Philippines Football League ===
==== Standings ====
Pos	Team	Pld	W	D	L	GF	GA	GD	Pts
3	Stallion Laguna	14	10	2	2	65	12	+53	32
4	Davao Aguilas	14	10	2	2	39	6	+33	32
5	One Taguig	14	9	4	1	69	14	+55	31
6	United City	14	9	3	2	51	13	+38	30
7	Manila Digger	14	8	0	6	35	25	+10	24
8	Loyola	14	5	1	8	32	45	−13	16
9	Maharlika Taguig	14	5	1	8	23	53	−30	16

Source: PFL
Rules for classification: 1) Points; 2) Goal difference; 3) Goals scored.

Results summary

Overall								Home						Away					
Pld	W	D	L	GF	GA	GD	Pts	W	D	L	GF	GA	GD	W	D	L	GF	GA	GD
13	8	3	2	42	11	+31	27	4	3	1	24	5	+19	4	0	1	18	6	+12

Last updated: July 4, 2024.
Source: PFL

==== Results by round ====
Round	1	2	3	4	5	6	7	8	9	10	11	12	13	14
Ground	H	A	A	H	A	H	A	H	H	H	H	A	H	A
Result	L	W	W	W	W	W	L	D	W	D	W	W	D	
Position	11	10	6	6	5	4	5	5	5	6	6			

Updated to match(es) played on July 4, 2024. Source: PFL
A = Away; H = Home; W = Win; D = Draw; L = Loss

==== Matches ====
April 7, 2024 1	United City	0–2	Kaya–Iloilo	Manila
17:30 UTC+8			Esso 4'; Melliza 81'	Stadium: Rizal Memorial Stadium

April 14, 2024 2	Philippine Army	1–3	United City	Manila
20:30 UTC+8	Celiz (yellow card) 68'; Acedo 90+2'		Dizon 54'; Ngueukam 64'; Sendra 71'	Stadium: Rizal Memorial Stadium

April 21, 2024 3	Philippine Air Force	1–4	United City	Manila
17:45 UTC+8	Lestingio (yellow card) 38'; Delariarte 45'; Abraham (yellow card) 90+1'		Ouano 40'; Kamara 45+3'; Angeles (yellow card) 45+4'; Pabualan 67'; Ngueukam 70'	Stadium: Rizal Memorial Stadium

May 5, 2024 4	United City	7–0	DB Garelli United	Manila
15:30 UTC+8	Sendra 8'; Pabualan 12'; Forrosuelo (yellow card) 27'; Ngueukam 34', 53'; Andrade 64'; Digha 76'; Nurhidayat 81'; Taningco (yellow card) 89'		Obu (yellow card) 34'	Stadium: Rizal Memorial Stadium

May 11, 2024 5	Manila Digger	2–4	United City	Manila
18:15 UTC+8	Ebarle (yellow card) 58'; Jatta 70', 71'		Ngueukam 1', 45', 84'; Nurhidayat (yellow card) 55'; Bini 90'	Stadium: Rizal Memorial Stadium

May 19, 2024 6	United City	10–0	Manila Montet	Manila
15:00 UTC+8	Sendra 12', 58'; Ngueukam 17', 60'; Bini 25'; Digha 54'; Hartmann 63', 68'; Bugas 74'; Nurhidayat 83'			Stadium: Rizal Memorial Stadium

May 25, 2024 7	Dynamic Herb Cebu	2–1	United City	Talisay
17:30 UTC+8	Gadia 27'; Amirul (yellow card) 43'; Rosquillo (yellow card) 64'; Corsame 74', (yellow card) 75'; Kore (yellow card) 90+1'		Sendra (yellow card) 41'; Digha (yellow card) 45' (yellow-red card) 61'; Hartmann 52'	Stadium: Dynamic Herb Sports Complex

June 1, 2024 8	United City	1–1	Stallion Laguna	Manila
17:30 UTC+8	Limbo 39'; Menzi (yellow card) 47'		Magson 84'; Schaffner (yellow card) 71'; Silva (yellow card) 90+1'	Stadium: Rizal Memorial Stadium

June 9, 2024 9	United City	1–0	Tuloy	Manila
15:00 UTC+8	Ngueukam 66'; Digha (yellow card) 89'		Lupango (yellow card) 61'	Stadium: Rizal Memorial Stadium

June 16, 2024 10	United City	0–0	Davao Aguilas	Manila
19:30 UTC+8	Clarino (yellow card) 31'; Menzi (yellow card) 45+2'; Nurhidayat (yellow card) 74'		K. Talaroc (yellow card) 45+2'; S. Sato (yellow card) 71'; Villareal (yellow card) 82'	Stadium: Rizal Memorial Stadium

June 22, 2024 11	United City	3–0	Mendiola 1991	Manila
20:30 UTC+8	Sendra 33', 81', 90+6' (pen.)		Edulan (yellow card) 62'; Aningalan (yellow card) 62'	Stadium: Rizal Memorial Stadium

June 30, 2024 12	Loyola	0–6	United City	Manila
15:00 UTC+8			Ngueukam 8'; Sendra 12', 39'; Menzi (yellow card) 51'; Bugas 63'; Hartmann 65'; Limbo 68'	Stadium: Rizal Memorial Stadium

July 6, 2024 13	United City	2–2	One Taguig	Manila
20:30 UTC+8	Limbo 11'; Digha (yellow card) 32'; Sendra 63'; Clarino (yellow card) 80'		Shimomura 2'; Amita (yellow card) 42'; Ingreso (red card) 51'; Hiraishi 76'	Stadium: Rizal Memorial Stadium

July 13, 2024 14	Maharlika Taguig	2–9	United City	Manila
20:30 UTC+8				Stadium: Rizal Memorial Stadium
