= UAAP Season 78 Men's Football Final =

- Event: UAAP Season 78 football tournaments
UP Fighting Maroons	Ateneo Blue Eagles
4	1
- Date: 5 May 2016
- Venue: Rizal Memorial Stadium, Manila
- Attendance: 9,000
- Weather: Fine

The UAAP Season 78 Men's Football Final took place on 5 May 2016 at the Rizal Memorial Stadium, featuring a matchup between UP Fighting Maroons and Ateneo Blue Eagles. UP won 4–1, with one goal from Daniel Gadia and a hat-trick from Kintaro Miyagi, to claim their sixth UAAP Football Championship final victory; Ateneo's goal was scored by Mikko Mabanag.

The men's and women's Final matches were on May 5, 2016, which was exactly eight months after the start of the season on September 5, 2015.

The UP Fighting Maroons dedicated their win for their teammate Rogie Maglinas who had just died of cancer.

== Route to the Final ==
From the elimination round, Ateneo Blue Eagles and UP Fighting Maroons made to the Final Four with De La Salle Green Archers and UST Growling Tigers. In the playoffs, the number 1 seeded UP Fighting Maroons beat the number 4 UST Growling Tigers by a score of 3–0, while in the other match, number 2 seeded De La Salle Green Archers was beaten by their arch-rival and number 3 seeded Ateneo Blue Eagles via penalty shoot-out that makes Ateneo meet UP in the Championship match.

Pos	Team	Pld	W	D	L	GF	GA	GD	Pts	Qualification
1	UP Fighting Maroons	14	9	3	2	16	5	+11	30	Semifinals
2	De La Salle Green Archers	14	9	2	3	26	10	+16	29	Semifinals
3	Ateneo Blue Eagles (H)	14	8	1	5	32	21	+11	25	Semifinals
4	UST Growling Tigers	14	7	4	3	21	21	0	25	Semifinals
5	FEU Tamaraws	14	7	3	4	28	10	+18	24	
6	NU Bulldogs	14	4	5	5	26	18	+8	17	
7	Adamson Soaring Falcons	14	1	2	11	3	42	−39	5	
8	UE Red Warriors	14	0	2	12	4	29	−25	2	

Source: ABS-CBN Sports
(H) Hosts

=== Bracket ===
Semifinals
1	**UP**	**3**
4	UST	0
2	La Salle	1(4)
3	**Ateneo**	**1(5)**

Finals
1	**UP**	**4**
3	Ateneo	1

- **Bold** = winner
- * = after extra time, ( ) = penalty shootout score

=== Semifinals ===
April 28, 2016
1500

UP Fighting Maroons	3–0	UST Growling Tigers
Kyle Magdato 22'; Kintaro Miyagi 37'; Raphael Resuma 90+1'	Report

Rizal Memorial Stadium
April 28, 2016
1700

De La Salle Green Archers	1–1 (a.e.t.)	Ateneo Blue Eagles
Gelo Diamante 75'	Report	Carlo Liay 36'
Penalties
Jhoguev Ybañez (penalty scored); Darius Diamante (penalty scored); Jan Cruz (penalty scored); Gelo Diamante (penalty scored); Jose Montelibano (penalty missed)	4–5	Jeremiah Rocha (penalty scored); Julian Roxas (penalty scored); Mikko Mabanag (penalty scored); Paolo Gabriel Alilam (penalty scored); Carlo Liay (penalty scored)

Rizal Memorial Stadium

== Match ==
=== Summary ===
In the first half, at the 28th minute Kintaro Miyagi scored the first goal that gives UP a 1–0 lead, at the 34th minute Daniel Gadia gave UP a 2–0 lead, and at the 36th minute Mikko Mabanag scored a goal from a free kick for Ateneo.

Ihe second half, Kintaro Miyagi scored his second goal that gave UP a 3–1 lead, and in the 80th minute Miyagi made a hat trick to give UP a 4–1 lead, which was the final score.

=== Details ===
May 5, 2016
15:00 UTC+8

UP Fighting Maroons	4–1	Ateneo Blue Eagles
Kintaro Miyagi 28' 70' 80'; Daniel Gadia 34'		Mikko Mabanag 36'

Rizal Memorial Stadium
Attendance: 9,000

UP Fighting Maroons	Ateneo Blue Eagles

GK	1	(Philippines) Nathanael Ace Villanueva
RB	3	(Philippines) Feb Baya
CB	22	(Philippines) Francisco Jose Primo Santos
CB	11	(Philippines) Julian Clarino
LB	14	(Philippines) Lou Adrian Rafanan
DM	12	(Philippines) Nino Muros
CM	17	(Philippines) Sebastian Patangan
CM	23	(Philippines) Daniel Gadia
LF	21	(Philippines) Jeremiah Borlongan
CF	31	(Philippines) Kintaro Miyagi
RF	27	(Philippines) Kyle Magdato
Manager:
(Philippines) Anto Gonzales

GK	26	(Philippines) Kenneth James
RB	31	(Philippines) Jose Rafael Lipardo
CB	29	(Philippines) Jeremiah Rocha
CB	24	(Philippines) Xavier Alcuaz
LB	4	(Philippines) Kendal Colet
LDM	27	(Philippines) Joseph Gerard Poe
RDM	7	(Philippines) Julian Roxas
LW	11	(Philippines) Jarvey Gayoso
CM	18	(Philippines) Carlo Liay
RW	19	(Philippines) Mikko Mabanag
CF	33	(Philippines) (Japan) Mashu Yoshioka
Manager:
(Philippines) Jaypee Merida

Match rules

- 90 minutes.
- 30 minutes of extra-time if necessary.
- Penalty shoot-out if scores still level.
- Seven named substitutes.
- Maximum of three substitutions.

== Broadcasting ==
The match was broadcast live on ABS-CBN Sports+Action on regular channel and ABS-CBN Sports+Action HD via cable TV and livestream.

== Attendance ==
More than 9,000 watched this championship match in Rizal Memorial Stadium.
