= UAAP Season 81 football tournaments =

Philippine college football tournament

UAAP Season 81 Football
- Host school: University of Santo Tomas
Men's Finals	G1	Wins
Ateneo Blue Eagles	2	1
De La Salle Green Archers	1	0
- Finals MVP: Jarvey Gayoso
- Winning coach: JP Merida
- TV network(s): ABS-CBN Sports+Action

Women's tournament
- TV network(s): ABS-CBN Sports+Action
Juniors' Finals	G1	Wins
FEU–D Baby Tamaraws	1	1
NUNS Bullpups	0	0
- Arena(s): Moro Lorenzo Football Field
- Finals MVP: Mark Jessar Tobias
- Winning coach: Bobae Park

The UAAP Season 81 seniors division football tournament started on February 17, 2019, with the Men's tournament played at the FEU-Diliman Football Field in Quezon City, some matches were played in Moro Lorenzo Football Field inside Ateneo as the Rizal Memorial Stadium is under renovation. While the women's division started on March 3, 2019 at Circulo Verde.

In the Finals of the Juniors Division, FEU Diliman successfully defended their crown for a record 9 consecutive title after defeating Nazareth School Nation University Bullpups 1 nil at Moro Lorenzo Football Field in the Ateneo de Manila University campus.

== Men's tournament ==
=== Elimination round ===
==== Team standings ====
Pos	Team	Pld	W	D	L	GF	GA	GD	Pts	Qualification
1	Ateneo Blue Eagles	14	8	2	4	37	12	+25	26	Qualified to the semifinals
2	UP Fighting Maroons	14	8	2	4	24	17	+7	26	Qualified to the semifinals
3	De La Salle Green Archers (H)	14	8	1	5	21	17	+4	25	Qualified to the semifinals
4	FEU Tamaraws	14	7	3	4	22	18	+4	24	Qualified to the semifinals
5	UST Growling Tigers	14	6	5	3	21	21	0	23	
6	Adamson Soaring Falcons	14	2	6	6	13	27	−14	12	
7	NU Bulldogs	14	2	4	8	14	27	−13	10	
8	UE Red Warriors	14	2	3	9	8	21	−13	9	

(H) Hosts

==== First round ====
17 February 2019
09:00 UTC+8

NU Bulldogs	1–1	Adamson Soaring Falcons
Mike Arbela 79'	Report	Jackson Ramos 85' (p.k.)

FEU Diliman
17 February 2019
13:00 UTC+8

De La Salle Green Archers	1–3	UST Growling Tigers
John Rey Lagura 14'	Report	Conrad Dimacali 17'; Juan Villanueva 36'; Glen Ramos 69'

FEU Diliman
17 February 2019
15:00 UTC+8

FEU Tamaraws	4–1	UE Red Warriors
Jermi Darapan 30'; Chester Pabualan 49'; Nicky Canonigo 61'; Alex Rayos 67'	Report	Champ Marin 51'

FEU Diliman

21 February 2019
09:00 UTC+8

Adamson Soaring Falcons	1–1	UST Growling Tigers
Allen Lozano 57'	Report	Steven Anotado 54'

Moro Lorenzo
21 February 2019
13:00 UTC+8

UE Red Warriors	1–0	Ateneo Blue Eagles
Louie Polinag 7'	Report

Moro Lorenzo

24 February 2019
09:00 UTC+8

Ateneo Blue Eagles	1–1	FEU Tamaraws
Julian Roxas 85'	Report	Poi Saldivar 45'

FEU Diliman
24 February 2019
13:00 UTC+8

Adamson Soaring Falcons	0–1	De La Salle Green Archers
	Report	Mohammad Almohjili 51'

FEU Diliman
24 February 2019
15:00 UTC+8

UST Growling Tigers	2–2	NU Bulldogs
Conrado Dimacali 27'; Dexter Benecio 90+6'	Report	Ivan Ouano 15', 19'

FEU Diliman

27 February 2019
09:00 UTC+8

FEU Tamaraws	2–2	UST Growling Tigers
Poi Saldivar 53'; Chester Pabualan 82'	Report	Conrado Dimacali 28'; AJ Pasion 90+?'

FEU Diliman
27 February 2019
13:00 UTC+8

De La Salle Green Archers	0–1	UE Red Warriors
	Report	Mark Lerion 51'

FEU Diliman
27 February 2019
15:00 UTC+8

UP Fighting Maroons	0–3 Awarded (Note: UP originally won the game with Kyle Magdato and JB Borlongan scoring for UP while Joshua Broche scored for NU.)	NU Bulldogs
	Report

FEU Diliman

3 March 2019
09:00 UTC+8

UP Fighting Maroons	2–1	Ateneo Blue Eagles
Daniel Saavedra 41' (p.k.); Kintaro Miyagi 49'	Report	Rupert Baña 79'

FEU Diliman
3 March 2019
13:00 UTC+8

De La Salle Green Archers	2–0	NU Bulldogs
Mateo Alegre 1'; Mikio Umilin 31'	Report

FEU Diliman
3 March 2019
15:00 UTC+8

UE Red Warriors	0–0	Adamson Soaring Falcons
	Report

FEU Diliman

7 March 2019
09:00 UTC+8

De La Salle Green Archers	2–1	UP Fighting Maroons
Shanden Vergara 36', 65'	Report	Kyle Magdato 66'

FEU Diliman
7 March 2019
13:00 UTC+8

FEU Tamaraws	2–1	NU Bulldogs
Gilbert Mendoza 20'; Poi Saldivar 34'	Report	Ivan Ouano 88'

FEU Diliman
7 March 2019
15:00 UTC+8

UST Growling Tigers	0–5	Ateneo Blue Eagles
	Report	Jarvey Gayoso 45+5' (p.k.), 50'; Julian Roxas 59'; Rupert Baña 59'; Luka Alleje 84'

FEU Diliman

10 March 2019
09:00 UTC+8

UST Growling Tigers	3–2	UE Red Warriors
Steven Anotado 60', 64'; Conrado Dimacali 82'	Report	Krysler Opeña 10'; Mason Vergara 71'

FEU Diliman
10 March 2019
13:00 UTC+8

FEU Tamaraws	2–1	UP Fighting Maroons
Anthony Decena 2'; Jermi Darapan 83'	Report	Kim Minsu 86' (o.g.)

FEU Diliman
10 March 2019
15:00 UTC+8

Adamson Soaring Falcons	0–4	Ateneo Blue Eagles
	Report	Jarvey Gayoso 45+1'; Mark Nacional 67', 80'; Luka Alleje 86'

FEU Diliman

14 March 2019
09:00 UTC+8

UE Red Warriors	0–2	NU Bulldogs
	Report	Ivan Ouano 47'}, 88'}

FEU Diliman
14 March 2019
13:00 UTC+8

UP Fighting Maroons	1–1	UST Growling Tigers
Daniel Saavedra 50'	Report	Steven Anotado 54'

FEU Diliman
14 March 2019
15:00 UTC+8

FEU Tamaraws	1–1	Adamson Soaring Falcons
Chester Pabualan 61'	Report	Kim Bardaje 65'

FEU Diliman

17 March 2019
09:00 UTC+8

De La Salle Green Archers	1–2	FEU Tamaraws
Rafael Montelibano 22'}	Report	Kim Minsu 1'} Nicky Canonigo 83'

FEU Diliman
17 March 2019
13:00 UTC+8

Ateneo Blue Eagles	4–0	NU Bulldogs
Rupert Baña 5', 58'; Mark Nacional 8'; Martin Ordoñez 82'	Report

FEU Diliman
17 March 2019
15:00 UTC+8

UE Red Warriors	1–2	UP Fighting Maroons
Jasper Absalon 42'	Report	Christian Lapas 62'; Kintaro Miyagi 90+?'

FEU Diliman

21 March 2019
13:00 UTC+8

UP Fighting Maroons	1–2	Adamson Soaring Falcons
Kintaro Miyagi 33'	Report	Allen Lozano 61', 68'

FEU Diliman
21 March 2019
15:00 UTC+8

Ateneo Blue Eagles	1–2	De La Salle Green Archers
Rupert Baña 26'	Report	Rael Montelibano 13', 24'

FEU Diliman

==== Second round ====
24 March 2019
13:30 UTC+8

Adamson Soaring Falcons	1–1	NU Bulldogs
Ricardo Ortinez 64'	Report	Ivan Ouano 18'

FEU Diliman
24 March 2019
15:30 UTC+8

UST Growling Tigers	1–1	De La Salle Green Archers
Miguel Mercader 90+?'	Report	Shanden Vergara 74'

FEU Diliman

28 March 2019
09:00 UTC+8

NU Bulldogs	0–0	UE Red Warriors
	Report

FEU Diliman
28 March 2019
13:00 UTC+8

UP Fighting Maroons	2–1	Adamson Soaring Falcons
Kintaro Miyagi 81'; John Abraham 90+6'	Report	Jesus Cadayong 49',

FEU Diliman
28 March 2019
15:00 UTC+8

FEU Tamaraws	1–4	Ateneo Blue Eagles
Kim Minsu 11'	Report	Jacob Liao 28', 77'; Rupert Baña 38'; Jarvey Gayoso 73'

FEU Diliman

31 March 2019
09:00 UTC+8

Adamson Soaring Falcons	1–7	Ateneo Blue Eagles
Jackson Ramos 31' (p.k.)	Report	Jarvey Gayoso 11', 41', 69'; Jeremiah️ Rocha 22'; Julian Roxas 45+2'; Mark Nacional 66'; Jabez Setters 76'

FEU Diliman
31 March 2019
13:00 UTC+8

UST Growling Tigers	1–0	FEU Tamaraws
Alijreh Fuchigami ?'	Report

FEU Diliman
31 March 2019
15:00 UTC+8

De La Salle Green Archers	0–2	UP Fighting Maroons
	Report	Karl Bugayong 8'; Kintaro Miyagi 58'

FEU Diliman

4 April 2019
09:00 UTC+8

NU Bulldogs	1–2	FEU Tamaraws
Angelo Paring 36'	Report	Chester Pabualan 48'; Nicky Canonigo 59'

FEU Diliman
4 April 2019
13:00 UTC+8

UE Red Warriors	1–2	UST Growling Tigers
Krysler Opeña 59'	Report	Ian De Castro 45'; Steven Anotado 87'

FEU Diliman
4 April 2019
15:00 UTC+8

De La Salle Green Archers	1–3	Ateneo Blue Eagles
Mauro Acot 10'	Report	Jarvey Gayoso 16', 83'; Rupert Baña 42'

FEU Diliman

7 April 2019
09:00 UTC+8

Adamson Soaring Falcons	2–4	De La Salle Green Archers
Jusuel Pilarca 13', 87'	Report	Mateo Alegre 45+?' (p.k.); John Rhey Lagura 63'; Shanden Vergara 67', 68'

FEU Diliman
7 April 2019
13:00 UTC+8

UST Growling Tigers	1–2	UP Fighting Maroons
Dexter Benecio 36'	Report	Kintaro Miyagi 12'; Kyle Magdato 55'

FEU Diliman
7 April 2019
15:00 UTC+8

NU Bulldogs	0–2	Ateneo Blue Eagles
	Report	Andreas Maniquis 12'; Mark Nacional 16'

FEU Diliman

11 April 2019
09:00 UTC+8

UE Red Warriors	0–2	De La Salle Green Archers
	Report	John Rey Lagura 76'; Jovan Marfiga 90+2'

FEU Diliman
11 April 2019
13:00 UTC+8

NU Bulldogs	1–4	UP Fighting Maroons
Ivan Ouano 54'	Report	Vince Parpan 64'; Daniel Saavedra 71' (p.k.); Jeremiah Borlongan 79'; John Abraham 88'

FEU Diliman
11 April 2019
15:00 UTC+8

Adamson Soaring Falcons	1–3	FEU Tamaraws
Allen Lozano 57'	Report	Nicky Canonigo 43'; Poi Saldivar 47'; Alex Rayos 73'

FEU Diliman

14 April 2019
09:00 UTC+8

Ateneo Blue Eagles	1–1	UP Fighting Maroons
Rupert Baña 9'	Report	Kintaro Miyagi 6'

FEU Diliman
14 April 2019
13:00 UTC+8

UE Red Warriors	0–1	FEU Tamaraws
	Report	Jermi Darapan 79'

FEU Diliman
14 April 2019
15:00 UTC+8

UST Growling Tigers	0–1	Adamson Soaring Falcons
	Report	Rey Poncardas 64'

FEU Diliman

=== Playoffs ===
Semifinals
1	**Ateneo**	**1**
4	FEU	0
2	UP	1
3	**La Salle**	**2**

Finals
1	**Ateneo** (a.e.t.)	**2**
3	La Salle	1

- **Bold** = winner
- * = after extra time, ( ) = penalty shootout score

=== Semifinals ===
May 9, 2019
16:00 UTC+8

UP Fighting Maroons	1–2	De La Salle Green Archers
Kintaro Miyagi 38'	Report	Jovan Marfiga 20'; Shanden Vergara 77'

Rizal Memorial Stadium
May 9, 2019
14:00 UTC+8

Ateneo Blue Eagles	1–0	FEU Tamaraws
Jarvey Gayoso 70'	Report

Rizal Memorial Stadium

=== Finals ===
May 16, 2019
15:00 UTC+8

Ateneo Blue Eagles	2–1 (a.e.t.)	De La Salle Green Archers
Jarvey Gayoso 90+1'; Julian Roxas 100'	Report	Mohammad Almohjili 77'

Rizal Memorial Stadium

=== Awards ===
UAAP Season 81 men's football champions
Ateneo Blue Eagles
Eighth title

- Most Valuable Player: Jarvey Gayoso (Ateneo De Manila University)
- Rookie of the Year: Shanden Vergara (De La Salle University)
- Best Striker: Jarvey Gayoso (Ateneo De Manila University)
- Best Midfielder: Jed Diamante (De La Salle University)
- Best Defender: Yoshi Koizumi (De La Salle University)
- Best Goalkeeper: Jae Arcilla (Ateneo De Manila University)
- Fairplay Award: University of Santo Tomas

== See also ==
- UAAP Season 81
