= UAAP Season 80 Men's Football Final =

- Event: UAAP Season 80 football tournaments
UP Fighting Maroons	UST Growling Tigers
1	0
- Date: 3 May 2017
- Venue: Rizal Memorial Stadium, Manila
- Man of the Match: Ian Clarino
- Weather: Fine

The UAAP Season 80 Men's Football Final took place on 3 May 2017 at the Rizal Memorial Stadium. It was the final match of the UAAP Season 80 and was contested between the UP Fighting Maroons and the UST Growling Tigers. UP won 1-0, with Ian Clarino's 21st minute goal to claim their eighteenth UAAP Football Championship title.

== Route to the Final ==
The Final Four of the tournament were #1 seed Ateneo Blue Eagles, #2 UP Fighting Maroons, #3 FEU Tamaraws, and #4 UST Growling Tigers who just finished from the Elimination Round. UP finished the season undefeated with 10 wins and 4 draws, and defeated 4th seed De La Salle, 1 - 0. The goal came from confusion with the La Salle defenders clearing the ball, which ended up with Kyle Magdato who easily converted a few feet from the spot kick area. This proved to be the needed goal for UP to advance to the final. UP overpowered La Salle 13 shots, with 6 on goal, against 4 shots.

On the other side of the draw, third seed UST Growling Tigers upset second seed and reigning champs Ateneo Blue Eagles, 1 - 0, which needed extra time after a scoreless draw after 90 minutes. The goal came from a corner kick by Austin Alianza in the 105th minute, initially cleared by Ateneo's goalkeeper Alex Arcilla which ended up with a UST player. A scramble ensued as Ateneo tried to clear the ball, however UST's Conrado Dimacali stood tall as the substitute headed the ball into the Ateneo net. UST avenged their season 79 defeat from Ateneo and headed to their first UAAP Men's Football finals since season 74 meeting, coincidentally against the same team, UP.

=== Team standings ===
Pos	Team	Pld	W	D	L	GF	GA	GD	Pts	Qualification
1	UP Fighting Maroons	14	10	4	0	32	6	+26	34	Qualified to the semifinals
2	Ateneo Blue Eagles	14	10	2	2	34	13	+21	32	Qualified to the semifinals
3	UST Growling Tigers	14	7	4	3	23	12	+11	25	Qualified to the semifinals
4	De La Salle Green Archers	14	6	2	6	16	17	−1	20	Qualified to the semifinals
5	UE Red Warriors	14	6	1	7	13	24	−11	19	
6	NU Bulldogs	14	5	1	8	12	15	−3	16	
7	FEU Tamaraws (H)	14	3	4	7	25	27	−2	13	
8	Adamson Soaring Falcons	14	0	0	14	4	45	−41	0	

(H) Hosts

=== Playoffs ===
Semifinals
1	**UP**	**1**
4	La Salle	0
2	Ateneo	0
3	**UST** (a.e.t.)	**1**

Finals
1	**UP**	**1**
3	UST	0

- **Bold** = winner
- * = after extra time, ( ) = penalty shootout score

=== Semifinals ===
April 26, 2018
16:00 UTC+8

UP Fighting Maroons	1–0	De La Salle Green Archers
Kyle Magdato 47'	Report

Rizal Memorial Stadium
April 26, 2018
14:00 UTC+8

Ateneo Blue Eagles	0–1 (a.e.t.)	UST Growling Tigers
	Report	Conrado Dimacali 106'

Rizal Memorial Stadium

== Match ==
The two teams last met in the Finals on UAAP Season 74 and UAAP Season 73 both going on the side of the Maroons. UST led by OJ Clarino, UP's Ian Clarino's older brother, suffered consecutive defeats in the finals against a stacked UP lineup then led by Jinggoy Valmayor, Ayii Nii, and Nathan Octavio.

With a cruel twist of fate, it was Ian Clarino who kept UST from tasting their first championship since Season 69. Coming from a set piece delivered by JB Borlongan a few yards from the penalty area, Ian Clarino was kept onside by a UST defender and left alone against the season's UAAP Best Keeper Zaldy Abraham. Clarino, who was named UAAP's Most Valuable Player, easily volleyed the ball straight to the net in the 21st minute. It was the difference as the championship went to the other side of Katipunan for the 2nd time in 3 years, giving UP its 18th UAAP football crown.

=== Details ===
May 3, 2018
15:00 UTC+8

UP Fighting Maroons	1–0	UST Growling Tigers
Ian Clarino 21'	Report

Rizal Memorial Stadium

UP Fighting Maroons	UST Growling Tigers

GK	1	(Philippines) Jose Anton Yared
RB	31	(Philippines) Ray Vincent Sanciangco
CB	12	(Philippines) Miguel Clarino
CB	11	(Philippines) Julian Clarino
LB	2	(Philippines) John William Abraham
DM	16	(Philippines) Christian Lapas
DM	28	(Philippines) Roland Saavedra
RF	10	(Philippines) Kyle Magdato	(yellow card) 43'
CM	29	(Philippines) Fidel Tacardon
LF	8	(Philippines) Jeremiah Borlongan
RF	9	(Philippines) Kintaro Miyagi
Manager:
(Philippines) Anto Gonzales

GK	24	(Philippines) Zaldy Abraham
LB	15	(Philippines) Darwin Busmion
CB	23	(Philippines) Dionisio Busmion
CB	6	(Philippines) Ian De Castro
LB	2	(Philippines) Juan Villanueva
LDM	19	(Philippines) Aljireh Fuchigami
RDM	14	(Philippines) Austin Alianza
CM	12	(Philippines) Jean Clarino
CM	10	(Philippines) Marvin Bricenio
CM	11	(Philippines) AJ Pasion
CF	33	(Philippines) Steven Anotado
Manager:
(Philippines) Marjo Allado

Match rules

- 90 minutes.
- 30 minutes of extra-time if necessary.
- Penalty shoot-out if scores still level.
- Seven named substitutes.
- Maximum of three substitutions.

== Broadcasting ==
The match was broadcast live on ABS-CBN Sports+Action for regular channel and ABS-CBN Sports+Action HD via livestream and Cable TV. The match commentators were Bob Guerrero and Miguel Carrion.
