= Jeremiah Borlongan =

Filipino footballer (born 1998)

Personal information
- Full name: Jeremiah Chabon Borlongan
- Date of birth: December 8, 1998 (age 27)
- Place of birth: Cagayan de Oro, Philippines
- Height: 1.68 m (5 ft 6 in)
- Position: Winger

Youth career
- Abba's Orchard School

College career
Years	Team	Apps	(Gls)
2015–2020	University of the Philippines		

Senior career*
Years	Team	Apps	(Gls)
2021–2026	Cebu	59	(8)
2026	Manila Digger	4	(0)

International career^{‡}
2013	Philippines U15		
2015–2016	Philippines U19	10	(1)
2017–2019	Philippines U23	9	(1)
2024	Philippines	1	(0)
- * Club domestic league appearances and goals as of March 11, 2026 ‡ National team caps and goals as of 17:05, 4 September 2024 (UTC)

Jeremiah Chabon "JB" Borlongan (born 8 December 1998) is a Filipino former professional footballer who played as a winger. He represented the Philippines national team in 2024.

== Personal life ==
Borlongan was born in Cagayan de Oro. He played youth football for Abba's Orchard School at age 10, and was also a member of the team dubbed the "Little Azkals", a group of gifted kids chosen to undergo special football training and form the eventual core of the Philippine Men's Football Team. The team was coached by coaches such as Anto Gonzales and Oliver Colina. His brother, Jethro, is also a footballer, and has also played for the various youth teams of the Philippines.

== Collegiate career ==
In 2016, Borlongan played for the college football team of the University of the Philippines alongside future teammates Kintaro Miyagi, Ace Villanueva, and Daniel Gadia. In his freshman year, UP would go on to win their first title in 5 years, defeating Ateneo 4–1 in the UAAP Season 78 final. In his third year, UP won again, topping the table at the end of the regular season and defeating University of Santo Tomas 1–0 in the Season 80 Final. Aside from that, UP also won another collegiate tournament, the Ang Liga trophy. Borlongan was planning to play one more year with UP after graduating, but plans fell through after UAAP Season 82 was cancelled due to the COVID-19 pandemic.

== Club career ==
=== Dynamic Herb Cebu ===
In 2021, Borlongan signed for Dynamic Herb Cebu, a newly-formed team that would start to compete in the 2021 Copa Paulino Alcantara. He would make his first appearance for the club in the opening game, a 1–0 loss to Stallion Laguna. Cebu officially joined the Philippines Football League a year later, and Borlongan scored his first goal for the club in a 2–1 win over Maharlika Manila in the 2022 edition of the Copa Paulino Alcantara. He would rack up 20 games, 4 goals, and 8 assists in his first full season with the club, after which they qualified for the 2023–24 edition of the AFC Cup.

== International career ==
=== Philippines U19 ===
After playing matches for the Azkals' U13 and U15 teams, Borlongan was called up for the Philippines' U19 squad for the 2015 AFF U-19 Youth Championship, making his debut in the opening match, a 2–1 win over Brunei. He would go on to play in the 2016 edition of the same championship and the 2018 AFC U-19 Championship qualifiers the next year.

=== Philippines U23 ===
In 2017, he got his first call-up for the Philippines' U-23 team for the 2017 Southeast Asian Games in Cambodia, alongside some of his fellow UP teammates Christian Lapas and Marco Casambre. He made his debut in the opening game, subbing on for Dylan de Bruycker in a 2–0 win over Cambodia. He would go on to play in the 2019 AFF U-22 Youth Championship and in two editions of the qualifiers for the AFC U-23 Asian Cup. He scored his first goal in a 2–1 loss to Vietnam in the 2019 AFF Championship. His last tournament representing the team was the 2019 SEA Games held in his home country the Philippines.

=== Philippines ===
In November 2022, after his recent performances for Cebu, Borlongan was included in the preliminary pool for the Philippines for the upcoming 2022 AFF Championship alongside teammates Daniel Gadia and Ace Villanueva, but didn't make the final roster.

In August 2024, Borlongan was not initially part of the roster for the 2024 Merdeka Tournament but eventually got called up alongside Sandro Reyes to replace injured Oskari Kekkonen and Jesse Curran. He made his senior national team debut in the 82nd minute of the match against Malaysia, where he replaced Alex Monis.

== Honors ==
Manila Digger

- Philippines Football League: 2025–26
