= 2026–27 Geylang International FC season =

Geylang International
2026–27 season
- Chairman: Thomas Gay
- Head coach: Mohd Noor Ali
- Stadium: Our Tampines Hub, Tampines
- Singapore Premier League: TBA
- Singapore Cup: TBA
- Top goalscorer: League: TBA; All: TBA
Home colours	Away colours

The 2026–27 season is Geylang International's 31th consecutive season in the top flight of Singapore football and in the Singapore Premier League. Along with the Singapore Premier League, the club will also compete in the Singapore Cup.

== Squad ==
=== Singapore Premier League ===
No.	Name	Nationality	Date of birth (age)	Previous club	Contract since	Contract end
Goalkeepers
1	Miloš Čupić	(Serbia)	24 April 1999 (age 27)	(Philippines) One Taguig (P1)	2026	2027
13	Aniq Zulfadli Matin	(Singapore)	11 May 2007 (age 19)	(Singapore) Geylang International U21	2023	2027
25	Dylan Pereira	(Singapore)	31 July 2000 (age 26)	(Singapore) FC Jurong	2026	2027
35	Hamzah Azizi	(Singapore)		(Singapore) Geylang International U17	2023	2027
83	Isa Faisal ^{SPL2 & U19}	(Singapore)		(Singapore) Geylang International U19	2025	2026
85	Raian Anaqi ^{SPL2 & U19}	(Singapore)		(Singapore) Geylang International U17	2023	2027
Defenders
2	Darren Teh	(Singapore)	9 September 1996 (age 30)	(Singapore) Balestier Khalsa	2026	2027
3	Cho Eun-su	(South Korea)	12 March 2004 (age 22)	(Singapore) FC Jurong	2026	2027
4	Kim Tae-uk	(North Korea) (Japan)	20 June 1998 (age 28)	(Singapore) FC Jurong	2026	2027
11	Harith Kanadi	(Singapore)	1 August 2000 (age 26)	(Singapore) Balestier Khalsa	2026	2027
15	SC Denilson	(Singapore)		(Singapore) Geylang International U21	2023	2027
19	Raiyan Noor	(Singapore)	20 January 2006 (age 20)	(Singapore) Geylang International U21	2023	2027
20	Shafrel Ariel	(Singapore)	6 April 2008 (age 18)	(Singapore) Tampines Rovers	2026	2027
23	Nazrul Nazari	(Singapore)	11 February 1991 (age 35)	(Singapore) Hougang United	2025	2027
26	Alessandro Mika Lura ^{SPL2 & U19}	(Singapore)		(Singapore) Geylang International U17	2024	2027
31	Azirul Aziq ^{SPL2 & U19}	(Singapore)		(Singapore) Geylang International U17	2024	2027
33	Mustaqim Mulyadi	(Singapore)	1 August 2003 (age 23)	(Singapore) FC Jurong	2026	2027
36	Irfan Rifqi ^{SPL2 & U19}	(Singapore)	22 May 2006 (age 20)	(Singapore) Tampines Rovers U21	2024	2027
37	Daniel Serrano	(United States)	8 May 2003 (age 23)	(Portugal) SC Rio Tinto (P3)	2026	2027
38	Adrian Danish ^{SPL2 & U19}	(Singapore)		(Singapore) Geylang International U17	2023	2027
42	Hanan Hadi ^{SPL2 & U19}	(Singapore)		(Singapore) Geylang International U17	2024	2027
44	Syabil Hisham	(Singapore)	20 September 2002 (age 24)	(Singapore) Balestier Khalsa	2026	2027
48	Sho Gamoh	(Singapore) (Japan)	1 May 2008 (age 18)	(Singapore) Geylang International U21	2024	2026
78	Ryan Afshan Juraimi	(Singapore)		(Singapore)	2026	2027
	Nizwan Izzairie	(Singapore)	26 January 2005 (age 21)	(Singapore) Geylang International U21	2023	2026
	Shaquille Danish ^{SPL2 & U19}	(Singapore)		(Singapore) Geylang International U21	2023	2027
Midfielders
5	Naoki Yoshioka	(Japan)	6 April 2002 (age 24)	(Singapore) FC Jurong	2026	2027
6	Anumanthan Kumar	(Singapore)	14 July 1994 (age 32)	(Thailand) Kanchanaburi Power (T1)	2026	2027
7	Kaisei Ogawa	(Japan)	25 February 2001 (age 25)	(Singapore) Young Lions	2025	2027
8	Joshua Pereira	(Singapore)	10 October 1997 (age 29)	(Singapore) SAFSA	2020	2027
21	Ryu Hardy Yussri	(Singapore)	20 April 2005 (age 21)	(Singapore) Young Lions	2025	2027
22	Nur Ikhsanuddin	(Singapore)	15 October 2005 (age 21)	(Singapore) Geylang International U21	2022	2026
24	Diego Aspiras	(Philippines)	28 May 2004 (age 22)	(Philippines) One Taguig (P1)	2026	2027
29	Paythn Banesh ^{SPL2 & U19}	(Singapore)		(Singapore) Geylang International U17	2024	2027
30	Milan Landreman	(United States)	13 August 2005 (age 21)	(Portugal) SC Rio Tinto (P3)	2026	2027
33	Kyan Neo	(Singapore)		(Singapore) Geylang International U21	2023	2026
34	Sachin Dev Balamurali ^{SPL2 & U19}	(Singapore)	16 December 2007 (age 18)	(Singapore) Geylang International U21	2024	2027
50	Raoul Hadid ^{SPL2 & U19}	(Singapore)		(Singapore) Geylang International U21	2024	2027
54	Aqil Chan	(Singapore)		(Singapore) Geylang International U17	2023	2027
55	Adwyn Halish ^{SPL2 & U19}	(Singapore)		(Singapore) Geylang International U17	2023	2027
77	Riz Ilhan Ashriq ^{SPL2 & U19}	(Singapore)		(Singapore) Geylang International U17	2024	2027
79	Irfan Haziq Izhar ^{SPL2 & U19}	(Singapore)		(Singapore) Geylang International U17	2023	2027
82	Owen Ng Jun Yu ^{SPL2 & U19}	(Singapore)		(Singapore) Lion City Sailors U17	2024	2027
88	Damien Chow Shan Yeow ^{SPL2 & U19}	(Singapore)	1 March 2008 (age 18)	(Singapore) Geylang International U17	2023	2027
89	Aqif Ariyan Saifuddin	(Singapore)	25 February 2008 (age 18)	(Singapore) FC Jurong U19	2026	2027
92	Chia Wayne hon	(Singapore)		(Spain) Alcobendas	2026	2027
93	Harris Ilhan ^{SPL2 & U19}	(Singapore)		(Singapore) Geylang International U17	2024	2027
	Andry Akimi ^{SPL2 & U19}	(Singapore)	18 July 2008 (age 18)	(Singapore) Geylang International U17	2023	2027
	Yusril Hanapi	(Singapore)	7 May 2006 (age 20)	(Singapore) Tampines Rovers U21	2026	2026
	Abdusukur Abduryim	(Norway)	5 October 2002 (age 24)	(Norway) Lambertseter IF	2026	2026
Forwards
9	Dejan Račić	(Montenegro) (Serbia)	15 July 1998 (age 28)	(Indonesia) Persita Tangerang (I1)	2026	2027
10	Ryoya Tanigushi	(Japan)	31 August 1999 (age 27)	(Singapore) Balestier Khalsa	2024	2027
14	Ali Manaf	(Singapore)	6 January 2005 (age 21)	(Singapore) Geylang International U21	2026	2027
16	Putera Irfan ^{SPL2 & U19}	(Singapore)		(Spain) Alcobendas	2026	2027
17	Prince Rio Rifae'i	(Singapore)	27 January 2008 (age 18)	(Singapore) Geylang International U21	2024	2027
18	Ryang Hyon-ju	(North Korea) (Japan)	31 May 1998 (age 28)	(Singapore) FC Jurong	2026	2027
27	Arihaan Bose ^{SPL2 & U19}	(Australia)		(Singapore) ActiveSG U17	2026	2027
32	Sahil Suhaimi	(Singapore)	8 July 1992 (age 34)	(Singapore) Tanjong Pagar United	2026	2027
39	David Sassarak ^{SPL2 & U19}	(Singapore) (Thailand)		(Singapore) Geylang International U17	2023	2027
86	Kiran Valentin Raab	(Singapore) (Germany)		(Japan) FC Jurong U17	2026	2026
90	Vedant Raj	(Singapore)		(Singapore) Geylang International U19	2024	2027
94	Karan Rao	(Singapore)		(Singapore) Balestier Khalsa U17	2026	2027
95	Azeem Hassan	(Singapore)		(Singapore) Tampines Rovers U19	2026	2027
	Adam Irfan	(Singapore) (Indonesia)		(Singapore) Geylang International U21	2023	2026
Players who left during season
Players loaned out
Players left for NS
25	Ahmad Munthaha Sriwaluya	(Singapore) (Indonesia)		(Singapore) Tampines Rovers U21	2025	2026
27	Hud Ismail	(Singapore)	6 April 2005 (age 21)	(Singapore) Geylang International U21	2024	2026
28	Uday Ghoshal ^{SPL2 & U19}	(Singapore)	9 January 2008 (age 18)	(Singapore) Geylang International U17	2025	2027
49	Syafi Suhaimi	(Singapore)	13 October 2006 (age 20)	(Singapore) Geylang International U21	2023	2026
	Christos Chua	(Singapore) (Greece)	29 October 2004 (age 22)	(Singapore) Geylang International U21	2022	2025

Remarks:
^{FP U21} These players are registered as U21 foreign players.

== Coaching staff ==
First Team

Position	Name	Ref.
Chairman	(Singapore) Desmond Gay	
Vice-chairman	(China) Shi Kan	
General manager		
Team Manager	(Singapore) Imran Zainal	
Head coach	(Singapore) Mohd Noor Ali	(Note: 2 years contract till 2024)
Assistant Coach	(Singapore) Hasrin Jailani	
SPL2 Coach	(Singapore) Nor Azli Yusoff	
Goalkeeping Coach	(Singapore) Rezal Hassan	
Fitness Coach	(Singapore) Sofiyan Abdul Hamid	
Fitness and Conditioning Coach	(Malaysia) Khairulanwar Isa	
Physiotherapist	(Singapore)	
Sports Trainer	(Singapore) Nurhaizal Sufri	
First Team Opposition & Set Piece Analysis Consultant	(Singapore) Rudie Imran Masih	
Kitman	(Singapore) Abdul Latiff	
Sports Scientist		

== Transfers ==
=== In ===
Pre-season

Date (Note: Date of club's announcement, will be either date of club announcement or 1 Jun-2025, the date which the free agent start due to lapse of previous contract)	Position	Player	Transferred from	Ref
First team
20 June 2026	DF	(North Korea) (Japan) Kim Tae-uk	(Singapore) FC Jurong	Free
20 June 2026	FW	(North Korea) (Japan) Ryang Hyon-ju	(Singapore) FC Jurong	Free
21 June 2026	GK	(Singapore) Dylan Pereira	(Singapore) FC Jurong	Free
21 June 2026	DF	(South Korea) Cho Eun-su	(Singapore) FC Jurong	Free
21 June 2026	MF	(Japan) Naoki Yoshioka	(Singapore) FC Jurong	Free
22 June 2026	GK	(Serbia) Miloš Čupić	(Philippines) One Taguig (PFL)	Free
22 June 2026	FW	(Montenegro) Dejan Račić	(Indonesia) Bhayangkara (Liga 1)	Free
23 June 2026	DF	(Singapore) Harith Kanadi	(Singapore) Balestier Khalsa	Free
24 June 2026	DF	(Singapore) Darren Teh	(Singapore) Balestier Khalsa	Free
25 June 2026	MF	(Singapore) Anumanthan Kumar	(Thailand) Kanchanaburi Power	Free
1 July 2026	DF	(Singapore) Syabil Hisham	(Singapore) Balestier Khalsa	Free
1 August 2026	FW	(Singapore) Sahil Suhaimi	(Singapore) Tanjong Pagar United	Free
29 August 2026	MF	(Philippines) Diego Aspiras	(Philippines) One Taguig (PFL)	Free
5 September 2026	MF	(United States) Milan Landreman	(Portugal) SC Rio Tinto (P3)	Free
12 September 2026	MF	(United States) Daniel Serrano	(Portugal) SC Rio Tinto (P3)	Free
17 October 2026	FW	(Singapore) Syazwan Latiff	(Singapore) SAFSA	End of NS

=== Out ===
Preseason

Date (Note: Date of club's announcement, will be either date of club announcement or 1 Jun-2025, the date which the free agent start due to lapse of previous contract)	Position	Player	Transferred To	Ref
First team
9 May 2026	FW	(Japan) Shuhei Hoshino	Retired	N.A.
10 May 2026	MF	(France) Vincent Bezecourt	Retired	N.A.
31 May 2026	DF	(Singapore) Iqram Rifqi	(Singapore)	Free
31 May 2026	FW	(Singapore) Amy Recha	(Singapore) Frenz GDT Circuit FC	Free
4 June 2026	GK	(Japan) Yu Kanoshima	(Japan)	Free
4 June 2026	DF	(South Korea) Kim Tae-ho	(South Korea)	Free
9 June 2026	DF	(Serbia) Nikola Ignjatovic	(Malta) Balzan	Free
9 June 2026	MF	(Japan) Shodai Yokoyama	(Singapore) BG Tampines Rovers	Free
9 June 2026	FW	(Japan) Riku Fukashiro	(Singapore) Tanjong Pagar United	Free
30 June 2026	GK	(Singapore) Rudy Khairullah	(Singapore) Tanjong Pagar United	Free
30 June 2026	DF	(Singapore) Shakir Hamzah	(Singapore) Balestier Khalsa	Free
30 June 2026	DF	(Singapore) Faisal Shahril	(Singapore) PVOSC	Free
30 June 2026	MF	(Norway) (East Turkestan) Abdusukur Abduryim	(Singapore)	Free
30 June 2026	MF	(Singapore) Gareth Low	(Singapore)	Free
30 June 2026	MF	(Singapore) Shahdan Sulaiman	(Singapore) Gymkhana FC	Free
30 June 2026	MF	(Singapore) Danie Hafiy	(Singapore) Lion City Sailors	End of loan
18 August 2026	MF	(Singapore) Josh Tan	(Singapore) Young Lions	Free
31 August 2026	DF	(South Korea) Ko Jae-hyun	(Mongolia) Hunters FC	Free
8 September 2026	DF	(Singapore) (Scotland) (Canada) Danial Crichton	(Singapore) Balestier Khalsa	Free
9 September 2026	MF	(Singapore) Ethan Henry Pinto	(Singapore) Balestier Khalsa	Free
9 September 2026	FW	(Singapore) (Hong Kong) (England) Timothy Cheng	(Singapore) Balestier Khalsa	Free
18 October 2026	FW	(Singapore) Syazwan Latiff	(Singapore) Tampines Rovers	Free

== Friendly ==
=== Pre-season ===
Win Draw Loss

30 July 2026 1	Geylang International (Singapore)	9–0	(Singapore) Jungfrau Punggol	Geylang
				Stadium: Geylang Training Centre; Referee: Jansen Foo

7 August 2026 2	Johor Darul Ta'zim II (Malaysia)	0–2	(Singapore) Geylang International	Johor
			Dejan Račić; Ryoya Taniguchi	Stadium: Larkin Stadium

Cambodia Tour (10–21 Aug)

12 August 2026 1	PKR Svay Rieng (Cambodia)	2–1	(Singapore) Geylang International	Svay Rieng
	Johannes Andreas Tartarotti 21', 42'		Dejan Račić 60'	Stadium: Morodok Techo National Stadium; Referee: Yong Sela

15 August 2026 2	Eastern District SA (Hong Kong)	3–1	(Singapore) Geylang International	Svay Rieng
	Lucas Silva 14', 83'; Luzinho 60' (pen.)		1' (o.g.)	Stadium: Morodok Techo National Stadium

== Team statistics ==
=== Appearances and goals ===
As of 22 Nov 26

No.	Pos.	Player	SPL		Singapore Cup		Total	
No.	Pos.	Player	Apps.	Goals	Apps.	Goals	Apps.	Goals
1	GK	(Serbia) Miloš Čupić	7	0	0	0	7	0
2	DF	(Singapore) Darren Teh	7	0	0	0	7	0
3	DF	(South Korea) Cho Eun-su	7	0	0	0	7	0
4	DF	(North Korea) (Japan) Kim Tae-uk	7	1	0	0	7	1
5	MF	(Japan) Naoki Yoshioka	7	0	0	0	7	0
6	MF	(Singapore) Anumanthan Kumar	3+3	0	0	0	6	0
7	MF	(Japan) Kaisei Ogawa	7	1	0	0	7	1
8	DF	(Singapore) Joshua Pereira	7	0	0	0	7	0
9	FW	(Montenegro) Dejan Račić	5+2	2	0	0	7	2
10	FW	(Japan) Ryoya Taniguchi	2+3	0	0	0	5	0
11	DF	(Singapore) Harith Kanadi	3+4	0	0	0	7	0
13	GK	(Singapore) Aniq Zulfadli Matin	0	0	0	0	0	0
14	FW	(Singapore) Ali Manaf	0	0	0	0	0	0
15	DF	(Singapore) SC Denilson	0	0	0	0	0	0
16	FW	(Singapore) Putera Irfan	0	0	0	0	0	0
17	MF	(Singapore) Prince Rio Rifae'i	0	0	0	0	0	0
18	FW	(North Korea) (Japan) Ryang Hyon-ju	7	4	0	0	7	4
19	DF	(Singapore) Raiyan Noor	0+2	0	0	0	2	0
20	DF	(Singapore) Shafrel Ariel	0	0	0	0	0	0
21	MF	(Singapore) Ryu Hardy Yussri	0	0	0	0	0	0
22	MF	(Singapore) Nur Ikhsanuddin	0+2	0	0	0	2	0
23	DF	(Singapore) Nazrul Nazari	6	0	0	0	6	0
24	MF	(Philippines) Diego Aspiras	0	0	0	0	0	0
25	GK	(Singapore) Dylan Pereira	0	0	0	0	0	0
26	DF	(Singapore) Alessandro Mika Lura	0+1	0	0	0	1	0
30	MF	(United States) Milan Landreman	0+4	0	0	0	4	0
32	MF	(Singapore) Sahil Suhaimi	2+4	2	0	0	6	2
37	MF	(United States) Daniel Serrano	0	0	0	0	0	0
44	DF	(Singapore) Syabil Hisham	0	0	0	0	0	0
Players who have played this season but had left the club or on loan to other club
Players who have played this season but had left the club permanently

== Competitions ==
=== Overview ===
Results summary (SPL)

Overall								Home						Away					
Pld	W	D	L	GF	GA	GD	Pts	W	D	L	GF	GA	GD	W	D	L	GF	GA	GD
0	0	0	0	0	0	0	0	0	0	0	0	0	0	0	0	0	0	0	0

=== Singapore Premier League ===
Win Draw Loss

14 September 2026 1	Geylang International (Singapore)	1–0	(Singapore) Tanjong Pagar United	Tampines
	Kim Tae-uk 33'		Madhu Mohana (red card) 41'; Marvin Anieboh (red card) 55'; Jared Gallagher (yellow card) 80'; Miki Llado (yellow card) 80'; Alex Masogo (yellow card) 87'; Masahiro Sugita (yellow card) 90'	Stadium: Our Tampines Hub; Referee: Hilmi Fuad; Man of the Match: (North Korea) (Japan) Kim Tae-uk

19 September 2026 2	Young Lions (Singapore)	1–5	(Singapore) Geylang International	Jalan Besar
	Hisatoshi Nishido 10'; Luth Harith (yellow card) 63'		Fairuz Fazli Koh 12' (o.g.); Ryang Hyon-ju 22', 90+2'; Dejan Račić 38'; Sahil Suhaimi 90+9'; Nazrul Nazari (yellow card) 73'	Stadium: Jalan Besar Stadium; Referee: Muhammad Zulfiqar; Man of the Match: (North Korea) (Japan) Ryang Hyon-ju

10 October 2026 3	Geylang International (Singapore)	3–1	(Singapore) FC Jurong	Tampines
	Hassan Sunny 8' (o.g.); Dejan Račić 78'; Sahil Suhaimi 68'		Akram Azman 3'; Mizuki Ando (yellow card) 63'	Stadium: Our Tampines Hub; Referee: Clarence Leow; Man of the Match: (North Korea) (Japan) Ryang Hyon-ju

17 October 2026 4	Balestier Khalsa (Singapore)	0–0	(Singapore) Geylang International	Bishan
			Dejan Račić (yellow card) 74'; Darren Teh (yellow card) 77'	Stadium: Bishan Stadium; Referee: Taufik Thana; Man of the Match: (Croatia) Mario Mustapić

26 October 2026 5	Geylang International (Singapore)	3–0	(Singapore) Hougang United	Tampines
	Ryang Hyon-ju 45+2', 90+2'; Kaisei Ogawa 53'; Harith Kanadi (yellow card) 65'	Report	Miloš Drinčić (yellow card) 47' (yellow-red card) 75'; Mahamé Siby (yellow card) 61'	Stadium: Our Tampines Hub; Referee: Ahmad A'Qashah; Man of the Match: (North Korea) (Japan) Ryang Hyon-ju

1 November 2026 6	Tampines Rovers (Singapore)	0–0	(Singapore) Geylang International	Tampines
		Report	Nazrul Nazari (yellow card) 37'	Stadium: Our Tampines Hub; Referee: Muhammad Taqi; Man of the Match: (Serbia) Miloš Čupić

22 November 2026 7	Lion City Sailors (Singapore)	5–0	(Singapore) Geylang International	Jalan Besar
	Toni Datković 45' (yellow card) 39'; Matthias Phaëton 47'; Lennart Thy 52' (pen.), 60'; Ilhan Fandi 80'; Kyoga Nakamura (yellow card) 39'; Hugo Gomes (yellow card) 74'; Giovanni Haag (yellow card) 82'; Lionel Tan (yellow card) 86'		Kim Tae-uk (yellow card) 51'	Stadium: Jalan Besar Stadium; Referee: Hilmi Fuad

27 November 2026 8	Geylang International (Singapore)	–	(Singapore) Tanjong Pagar United	Tampines
				Stadium: Our Tampines Hub

13 February 2027 9	Hougang United (Singapore)	–	(Singapore) Geylang International	Bishan
				Stadium: Bishan Stadium

21 February 2027 10	Geylang International (Singapore)	–	(Singapore) Tampines Rovers	Tampines
				Stadium: Our Tampines Hub

26 February 2027 11	FC Jurong (Singapore)	–	(Singapore) Geylang International	Jurong East
				Stadium: Jurong East Stadium

5 March 2027 12	Balestier Khalsa (Singapore)	–	(Singapore) Geylang International	Bishan
				Stadium: Bishan Stadium

14 March 2027 13	Geylang International (Singapore)	–	(Singapore) Lion City Sailors	Tampines
				Stadium: Our Tampines Hub

23 January 2027 14 (Rescheduled)	Geylang International (Singapore)	–	(Singapore) Young Lions	Tampines
				Stadium: Our Tampines Hub

4 April 2027 15	Lion City Sailors (Singapore)	–	(Singapore) Geylang International	Jalan Besar
				Stadium: Jalan Besar Stadium

30 January 2027 16 (Rescheduled)	Geylang International (Singapore)	–	(Singapore) Balestier Khalsa	Tampines
				Stadium: Our Tampines Hub

16 April 2027 17	Geylang International (Singapore)	–	(Singapore) Hougang United	Tampines
				Stadium: Our Tampines Hub

24 April 2027 18	Tanjong Pagar United (Singapore)	–	(Singapore) Geylang International	Jurong East
				Stadium: Jurong East Stadium

30 April 2027 19	Geylang International (Singapore)	–	(Singapore) Tampines Rovers	Tampines
				Stadium: Our Tampines Hub

9 May 2027 20	Geylang International (Singapore)	–	(Singapore) Young Lions	Tampines
				Stadium: Our Tampines Hub

14 May 2027 21	FC Jurong (Singapore)	–	(Singapore) Geylang International	Jurong East
				Stadium: Jurong East Stadium

Pos	Teams	Pld	W	D	L	GF	GA	GD	Pts
1	Lion City Sailors	6	5	1	0	25	3	+22	16
2	Tampines Rovers	6	5	1	0	18	3	+15	16
3	Geylang International	7	4	2	1	12	7	+5	14
4	FC Jurong	7	3	1	3	14	11	+3	10
5	Tanjong Pagar United	7	3	1	3	11	18	−7	10
6	Balestier Khalsa	7	2	1	4	9	15	−6	7
7	Young Lions (Note: Young Lions are not eligible to represent Singapore in AFC club competitions.)	7	1	0	6	8	25	−17	3
8	Hougang United	7	0	1	6	4	19	−15	1

Updated to match(es) played on 22 November 2026. Source: Singapore Premier League
Rules for classification: 1) Points; 2) goal difference; 3) goals scored; 4) wins

== Competition (SPL2) ==
Win Draw Loss

25 August 2026 1	Balestier Khalsa (Singapore)	2–1	(Singapore) Geylang International	Tampines
	Alessandro Lura 44' (o.g.); Timothy Cheng 70' (pen.); Irfan Mika'il (yellow card) 11'; Danial Scott Crichton (yellow card) 72'; Shaddiq Mansor (yellow card) 76'		Harith Kanadi 13'; Ryoya Taniguchi (yellow card) 90+3'	Stadium: Our Tampines Hub

29 August 2026 2	Hougang United (Singapore)	0–1	(Singapore) Geylang International	Bishan
	Brant Tan (yellow card) 18'; Lin Zhen hao (yellow card) 30'		Sahil Suhaimi 71'; Putera Muhammad (yellow card) 76'	Stadium: Bishan Stadium

3 September 2026 3	Geylang International (Singapore)	4–0	(Singapore) Lion City Sailors	Bedok
	Ryoya Taniguchi 27'; Sahil Suhaimi 84'; Ryang Hyon-ju 87', 90'		Caden Pereira (yellow card) 82'	Stadium: Bedok Stadium

7 September 2026 4	Geylang International (Singapore)	3–0	(Singapore) FC Jurong	Tampines
	Dejan Račić 6'; Ryang Hyon-ju 28'; Sahil Suhaimi 90'; Raiyan Noor (yellow card) 41'; Alessandro Lura (yellow card) 77'		Izz Anaqi (yellow card) 16'; Tyler Matthew Ho Zheng Yu (yellow card) 63'	Stadium: Our Tampines Hub

6 November 2026 5	Tanjong Pagar United (Singapore)	0–7	(Singapore) Geylang International	Jurong East
				Stadium: Jurong East Stadium

23 November 2026 6	Young Lions (Singapore)	–	(Singapore) Geylang International	Bedok
				Stadium: Bedok Stadium

6 December 2026 7	Geylang International (Singapore)	–	(Singapore) Tampines Rovers	Bedok
				Stadium: Bedok Stadium

12 December 2026 8	Geylang International (Singapore)	–	(Singapore) Balestier Khalsa	Bedok
				Stadium: Bedok Stadium

16 December 2026 9	Hougang United (Singapore)	–	(Singapore) Geylang International	Tampines
				Stadium: Our Tampines Hub

20 September 2026 10 (Rescheduled)	Geylang International (Singapore)	3–0	(Singapore) Lion City Sailors	Bedok
	Ryoya Taniguchi 19', 45'; Milan Landreman 33'; Diego Aspiras (yellow card) 31'; Sahil Suhaimi (yellow card) 32'		Caden Pereira (yellow card) 51'; Aiman Eszuan (yellow card) 90'; Aryan Bahadur Chhetri (yellow card) 90+1'	Stadium: Bedok Stadium; Referee: Thawfeek Ahamad

5 January 2027 11	FC Jurong (Singapore)	–	(Singapore) Geylang International	Choa Chu Kang
				Stadium: Choa Chu Kang Stadium

8 January 2027 12	Geylang International (Singapore)	–	(Singapore) Young Lions	Bedok
				Stadium: Bedok Stadium

12 January 2027 13	Geylang International (Singapore)	–	(Singapore) Tanjong Pagar United	Bedok
				Stadium: Bedok Stadium

16 January 2027 14	Tampines Rovers (Singapore)	–	(Singapore) Geylang International	Tampines
				Stadium: Our Tampines Hub

20 January 2027 15	Balestier Khalsa (Singapore)	–	(Singapore) Geylang International	Bedok
				Stadium: Bedok Stadium

24 January 2027 16	Geylang International (Singapore)	–	(Singapore) Hougang United	Bedok
				Stadium: Bedok Stadium

30 January 2027 17	Lion City Sailors (Singapore)	–	(Singapore) Geylang International	Bedok
				Stadium: Bedok Stadium

3 February 2027 18	Geylang International (Singapore)	–	(Singapore) FC Jurong	Bedok
				Stadium: Bedok Stadium

22 February 2027 19	Young Lions (Singapore)	–	(Singapore) Geylang International	Bedok
				Stadium: Bedok Stadium

1 March 2027 20	Geylang International (Singapore)	–	(Singapore) Tanjong Pagar United	Bedok
				Stadium: Bedok Stadium

5 April 2027 21	Tampines Rovers (Singapore)	–	(Singapore) Geylang International	Tampines
				Stadium: Our Tampines Hub

Pos	Team	Pld	W	D	L	GF	GA	GD	Pts	Qualification or relegation
1	Geylang International II	6	5	0	1	19	2	+17	15	Champion
2	Balestier Khalsa II	6	4	1	1	10	7	+3	13	
3	Tampines Rovers II	5	4	0	1	18	5	+13	12	
4	Young Lions B	3	2	0	1	10	7	+3	6	
5	FC Jurong II	5	1	1	3	11	12	−1	4	
6	Hougang United II	5	1	1	3	5	13	−8	4	
7	Tanjong Pagar United II	6	1	1	4	8	24	−16	4	
8	Lion City Sailors II	6	1	0	5	7	18	−11	3	

First match(es) will be played: 6 November 2026. Source: Singapore Premier League 2
Rules for classification: 1) points; 2) goal difference; 3) number of goals scored; 4) number of wins
