= OJ Clarino =

Filipino footballer (born 1990)

Personal information
- Full name: Mario Javier Noda Clarino
- Date of birth: July 27, 1990 (age 36)
- Place of birth: Quezon City, Philippines
- Height: 1.75 m (5 ft 9 in)
- Positions: Full-back; midfielder

Team information
- Current team: Manila Digger
- Number: 27

College career
Years	Team	Apps	(Gls)
2009–2012	University of Santo Tomas		

Senior career*
Years	Team	Apps	(Gls)
2012–2013	Stallion		
2013	Pachanga Diliman		
2013–2015	Stallion	26	(1)
2015–2018	Global	33	(3)
2018–2020	Stallion Laguna	13	(0)
2020–2021	Kaya–Iloilo	2	(0)
2022–2023	Maharlika Manila	9	(1)
2024–2025	Davao Aguilas	29	(1)
2025–	Manila Digger	7	(0)

International career^{‡}
2011	Philippines U23		
- * Club domestic league appearances and goals as of 6:12, March 11, 2026 (UTC) ‡ National team caps and goals as of 10:19, July 24, 2024 (UTC)

Mario Javier Noda Clarino (born 27 July 1990), commonly known as Ojay Clarino, is a Filipino professional footballer who plays as both a full-back and midfielder for Philippines Football League club Manila Digger.

== Personal life ==
Clarino was born in Quezon City in the Philippines. He comes from a family of footballers, being one of 12 children who played football. His older brother Popoy is currently coaching the men's team of the University of the Philippines Diliman in the UAAP, while his younger brother Julian plays abroad in Australia with Bulli FC. Two of his other younger brothers, Gino and Miguel, currently play for Philippine clubs Davao Aguilas and United City, respectively.

== Collegiate career ==
Clarino played college football for the University of Santo Tomas Growling Tigers, first entering as a freshman in 2009. During his stint at UST he became one of the team's star players, leading the team to the final in 2012, where they lost to the University of the Philippines.

== Club career ==
=== Stallion and Pachanga ===
In 2012, after graduating from UST, he joined Stallion FC of the United Football League. In his first year at the club, he came on as a sub in the final of the 2012 UFL Cup, where Stallion upset Global to win their first-ever title. He would rejoin Stallion twice more, with one stint taking place from 2013 to 2015 and the other spanning the 2018 and 2019 Philippines Football League seasons.

In 2013, after Stallion won the title, he left the club for a brief spell to join Quezon City-based club Pachanga Diliman, who had gotten newly promoted to the UFL. Pachanga finished the season in 7th, 14 points above relegation, while his former club won their first-ever league title. He would return to Stallion after the season finished.

=== Global ===
After a successful Stint with Stallion, Clarino moved to defending UFL champions Global, finishing 2nd with them in 2015 and winning the last edition of the United Football League in 2016. He would stay with Global as the club played in the newly formed Philippines Football League, and was a fixture of the club during its run in the 2017 AFC Cup. He would leave in early 2018 after the club encountered financial difficulties.

=== Kaya–Iloilo ===
Another PFL club in Kaya–Iloilo signed Clarino after his last stint with Stallion. However, his time at the club was at first delayed due to the COVID-19 pandemic, with Clarino making his debut in October on the opening matchday against Maharlika Manila. Kaya would end up finishing second that season.

=== Maharlika Manila ===
Clarino joined Maharlika Taguig (then known as Maharlika Manila) in early 2022, in time for the club's campaign in the 2022 Copa Paulino Alcantara, where they almost qualified for the semi-finals. He would play with the Manila-based club until early 2023, where he would leave the team and embark on a short career break.

=== Davao Aguilas ===
In early 2023, Clarino was signed by Davao Aguilas, a club that had departed the PFL in 2018 and were making a comeback in the 2023 Copa Paulino Alcantara. He was a regular for the team as they went on a fairytale run to the final, ultimately losing to Kaya on penalties. He would stick with Davao as they made a full return to the league during the 2024 PFL season, finishing 3rd.

== International career ==
=== Philippines U23 ===
While playing for UST in 2011, Clarino would get a call-up to the Philippines U23 National Team under coach Michael Weiß. He would be with the squad for the 2011 SEA Games, though the Philippines would finish bottom with 1 win and 4 losses.

=== Philippines ===
Clarino was called up to the Philippine senior team a year later in 2012 for a friendly against Malaysia, though over the course of the next year he would not get a senior team cap. He would get further national team callups by coach Thomas Dooley in 2016 and 2017, but to this date has still not made a national team appearance.
