= Darlton Digha =

Cameroonian footballer

Personal information
- Full name: Darlton Digha
- Date of birth: April 9, 1998 (age 28)
- Place of birth: Bamenda, Cameroon
- Height: 1.66 m (5 ft 5 in)
- Position: Attacking midfielder

Team information
- Current team: Maharlika Taguig
- Number: 7

Youth career
- 2006–2010: CEFOJET Academy

College career
Years	Team	Apps	(Gls)
2018–2023	Adamson University		

Senior career*
Years	Team	Apps	(Gls)
2024	United City	11	(2)
2024–	Maharlika Taguig	3	(1)

Managerial career
- 2023–: Adamson University
- * Club domestic league appearances and goals as of 09:51, November 3, 2024 (UTC)

Darlton Digha (born 9 April 1998) is a Cameroonian professional footballer who plays as both an attacking midfielder and winger for Philippines Football League club Maharlika Taguig. He is also the current head coach of the Adamson University football team.

== Personal life ==
Digha was born in the city of Bamenda in northwestern Cameroon. He played youth football for CEFOJET Academy before leaving for the Philippines to play college football.

== Career ==
=== Adamson University ===
After moving to the Philippines, Digha was initially supposed to play college football for the varsity team of De La Salle University, but transferred in 2018 to the Adamson Soaring Falcons. Though his college career would be hampered by the COVID-19 pandemic, he played football for Adamson for 5 years before graduating in July 2024.

=== United City ===
Before the onset of the 2024 Philippines Football League season, Digha was snapped up by United City, one of the league's former champions. He made his debut on the second matchday in a 3–1 win over Philippine Army and scored two goals in the short 14-game season. He scored his first in a 7–0 rout of Don Bosco Garelli United, scoring another in a dominant 10–0 win over Manila Montet. During a heated match against Dynamic Herb Cebu, he was shown a red card.

=== Maharlika Taguig ===
After the conclusion of the 2024 season, United City announced their withdrawal once more from the league while citing financial difficulties as the reason, leaving Digha without a club. He then signed with Maharlika Taguig also of the PFL, under former United City coach Marian Mihail. He scored in his third match for the club in a 4–1 loss to Kaya–Iloilo.

== Coaching career ==
In 2023, Digha participated in the 'C' Diploma Course held by the Philippine Football Federation in Carmona, Cavite, alongside other PFL players. During the duration of the course, he was also one of the coaches of the youth team of Kaya FC.

Before Digha graduated from Adamson in 2023, he was approached by Father Aldrin Suan, the sporting director of Adamson, regarding the coaching job of the football team, which he accepted, seeing it as a "good opportunity to give back to the community". That 2023, he led Adamson in their first-ever participation in the 2023 Copa Paulino Alcantara, and won his first-ever coaching trophy as Adamson won the 2023 Ang Liga in November, where he was sent off during the final. His coaching duties would continue during UAAP Season 87.
