= Miguel Clarino =

Filipino footballer (born 1997)

Personal information
- Full name: Jose Miguel Noda Clarino
- Date of birth: February 1, 1997 (age 29)
- Place of birth: Mandaluyong, Philippines
- Height: 1.85 m (6 ft 1 in)
- Position: Centre-back

College career
Years	Team	Apps	(Gls)
2016–2020	University of the Philippines		

Senior career*
Years	Team	Apps	(Gls)
2020–2021	United City	2	(0)
2021	Mendiola 1991	2	(0)
2022	Maharlika Manila	6	(1)
2022–2023	Customs United	7	(0)
2024	United City	11	(1)
2024–2025	Davao Aguilas	16	(0)
2026	Nongbua Pitchaya	10	(0)

International career^{‡}
2015–2016	Philippines U19	2	(0)
2019	Philippines U23	8	(0)
- * Club domestic league appearances and goals as of 10:13, August 7, 2024 (UTC) ‡ National team caps and goals as of 10:13, August 7, 2024 (UTC)

Jose Miguel Noda Clarino (born 1 February 1997) is a Filipino professional footballer who plays for Thai League 2 club, Nongbua Pitchaya, mainly as a centre-back but occasionally as a full-back. He has also represented the Philippines internationally at youth level.

== Personal life ==
Clarino was born in Mandaluyong City to parents Randy and Maien. He comes from a family of footballers, having played at the university level with his brother Ian. His brother, Popoy, is currently coaching the UP football team, while his brother OJ is his teammate at Davao Aguilas.

== Collegiate career ==
Following in the footsteps of his older brother Ian, Clarino played college football for the Fighting Maroons of the University of the Philippines in the UAAP starting in 2016. In his third year, UP won the UAAP Season 80 championship, where he played alongside Ian, with older brother Gino on the opposing side playing for the UST Growling Tigers. He would choose to play an extra year for UP and became captain of the team, though due to the break in the calendar caused by the COVID-19 pandemic, he would be among those to forgo his last year of eligibility.

== Club career ==
=== First pro contract ===
After leaving UP, he was snapped up by United City, a club reformed from the old Ceres–Negros, to play in the 2020 PFL bubble. He would make his debut on the second matchday, a 6–0 win over Mendiola 1991, as United City won the PFL that year. He would again play for United City during their first campaign in the 2021 AFC Champions League, though the club would subsequently withdraw from the 2021 Copa Paulino Alcantara later that year. The club's sudden withdrawal prompted Clarino to move from United City to competing club Mendiola, with the club finishing in the group stages that edition.

=== Maharlika ===
In 2022, he would transfer to Maharlika Manila to play in the 2022 edition of the Copa Paulino Alcantara, where his brothers OJ and Gino were playing. On the club's second matchday, Maharlika would win 2–1 against Clarino's former club Mendiola, courtesy of an equalizer by his brother Gino, with Clarino himself scoring the winning goal.

=== Thailand ===
Shortly before the start of the 2022–23 PFL season, Maharlika announced Clarino's departure from the club, as he moved abroad to play for Thai League 2 club Customs United. He had a short stint at the club, racking up 7 appearances before departing in early 2023, including matches in the Thai FA Cup.

=== Return to United City ===
Clarino would take a short break from football, returning in 2024 to play once more for United City as the club ramped up preparations for the 2024 Philippines Football League season. Under coach Ramon Tribulietx, he became a fixture at the club that season, making 11 appearances in a shortened season as United City finished 6th.

== International career ==
=== Philippines U19 ===
Clarino would make his international debut for the Philippines in 2015, as he was called up to the Philippines U19 team while still in college for the 2015 AFF U19 Championship, but didn't make an appearance. He would receive another call-up a year later for the 2016 edition of the same tournament, where he made his debut in a 2–1 loss to Timor Leste.

=== Philippines U23 ===
He would get called up again, this time for the country's U23 team, in the 2019 AFF U23 Championship. He would get further call-ups to the 2020 AFC U23 Championship qualifiers, as well as the 2019 edition of the Merlion Cup, where he would captain the team.
