= Zachary Taningco =

Filipino footballer (born 2004)

Personal information
- Full name: Zachary Cagaanan Taningco
- Date of birth: 8 October 2004 (age 22)
- Place of birth: Philippines
- Height: 1.70 m (5 ft 7 in)
- Positions: Full-back; midfielder

Team information
- Current team: Manila Digger
- Number: 22

Youth career
- British School Manila
- GOM Academy
- Stallion Laguna

Senior career*
Years	Team	Apps	(Gls)
2022–2023	Azkals Development Team	2	(0)
2024	United City	12	(0)
2024–	Manila Digger	19	(0)

International career^{‡}
2019	Philippines U17	9	(0)
2022	Philippines U19	6	(0)
2025–	Philippines U23	5	(0)
- * Club domestic league appearances and goals as of 03:27, 17 August 2025 (UTC) ‡ National team caps and goals as of 03:27, 17 August 2025 (UTC)

Zachary Cagaanan "Ziggy" Taningco (born 8 October 2004) is a Filipino professional footballer who plays as a midfielder and full-back for Philippines Football League club Manila Digger and the Philippines under-23 national team.

== Youth career ==
Taningco was born in Manila, Philippines. He studied at British School Manila and played youth football for Great Oaks Manor (GOM) Academy and for the youth team of PFL club Stallion Laguna. He also studies in Ateneo de Manila University.

== Club career ==
In 2022, Taningco, played for the Azkals Development Team of the Philippines Football League during the 2022–23 season. He made his debut in a 2–0 loss to Stallion.

Before the start of the 2024 season, Taningco was signed by local heavyweight United City, making his debut in the league's opening matchday in a 2–0 loss to Kaya–Iloilo. He became the team's starting right-back that season, though United City withdrew from the league at the season's end.

Taningco would sign for Manila Digger before the 2024–25 season, becoming a first-team starter as the club finished as runners-up in both the PFL and the Finals Series. In 2025, Digger played their first-ever AFC match in the AFC Champions League Two qualifiers, where Taningco played right back as the team lost 2–1 to Persib Bandung.

== International career ==
=== Philippines U16 ===
Taningco received his first call-up to the Philippines under-17 national team in 2019 for the 2019 AFF U-15 Championship, making his debut in a 7–1 loss against Timor Leste. He was called up again later that year for the 2020 AFC U-16 Championship Qualifiers.

=== Philippines U19 ===
Three years later, Taningco was called up to the under-19 national team to participate in the 2022 AFF U-19 Championship, debuting in a narrow 1–0 loss to Thailand. He represented the country once more later that year in the 2023 AFC U-20 Asian Cup qualifiers.

=== Philippines U23 ===
For the 2025 ASEAN U-23 Championship, Taningco was once again called up for the under-23 team, and made his debut on the opening matchday as the Philippines upset Malaysia 2–0. He played at right-back as the country clinched its first-ever semifinal in the competition, eventually finishing fourth.

== Honors ==
Manila Digger

- Philippines Football League: 2025–26
