= Henri Bandeken =

Cameroonian footballer (born 1984)

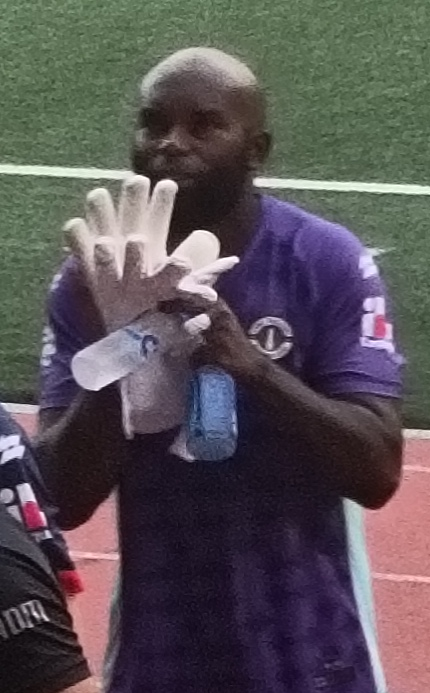
- Bandeken in 2025

Personal information
- Full name: Henri Bandeken Fong
- Date of birth: 14 February 1990 (age 36)
- Place of birth: Cameroon
- Position: Goalkeeper

Team information
- Current team: One Taguig
- Number: 30

Senior career*
Years	Team	Apps	(Gls)
–2008	Vogt AC		
2008–2009	Canon Yaoundé		
2009–2010	Kousseri FC		
2015–2016	Stallion Laguna	19	(0)
2016–2020	Green Archers United	19	(0)
2020–2022	Maharlika Manila	5	(0)
2022–2023	Mendiola 1991	6	(0)
2023–2024	Kaya–Iloilo		
2024	United City	11	(0)
2024–	One Taguig	2	(0)
- * Club domestic league appearances and goals as of 14:08, 26 January 2025 (UTC)

Henri Bandeken Fong (born 14 February 1990) is a Cameroonian professional footballer who plays as a goalkeeper for Philippines Football League club One Taguig.

== Club career ==
=== Early career ===
Bandeken played a large part of his early professional career in his home country of Cameroon, first with Vogt AC and later with Kousseri FC. In between, however, he played as keeper for Elite One club Canon Yaoundé, representing them in the CAF Champions League playoffs.

=== United Football League ===
In 2015, he moved from Cameroon to sign with Stallion of the United Football League alongside Serge Kaole, playing with them for one season, finishing fifth. In 2016, he moved to Green Archers United.

=== Philippines Football League ===
Bandeken would stay with Green Archers United for the Weekend Futbol League after the club declined to participate in the newly-formed PFL. However, he remained with the squad when they did join, keeping second-most clean sheets with 8.

He moved to new club Maharlika Manila in 2020 for their debut season, displaying more top-drawer performances.

In 2022, he moved to Mendiola 1991 for the upcoming 2022–23 season.

=== Kaya–Iloilo ===
In 2023, after a short break, he would sign with PFL champions Kaya–Iloilo as a goalkeeping reinforcement for the 2023–24 AFC Champions League.

== International career ==
While playing football for Vogt AC, he was called up to the Cameroon national team for the 2007 CEMAC Cup in Chad, though the country did not send an official first-team but one composed of amateurs.
