= Marvin Angeles =

Footballer

Personal information
- Full name: Marvin Janwer Malinay Angeles
- Date of birth: 9 January 1991 (age 35)
- Place of birth: Venezia, Italy
- Height: 1.75 m (5 ft 9 in)
- Position: Central midfielder

Team information
- Current team: Maharlika
- Number: 17

Senior career*
Years	Team	Apps	(Gls)
2011–2012	Laos F.C.		
2012–2014	Global	7	(1)
2014–2017	Ceres–La Salle	14	(1)
2017–2018	Kaya–Iloilo	5	(0)
2018–2019	Global Cebu	17	(2)
2019–2020	Green Archers United	20	(6)
2020–2022	Azkals Development Team	5	(0)
2022–2023	Stallion Laguna	8	(0)
2023–2024	Davao Aguilas	8	(1)
2024	United City	1	(0)
2024–	Maharlika Taguig	13	(0)

International career
	Philippines U23		(0)
2012	Philippines	6	(0)
- * Club domestic league appearances and goals

Marvin Janwer Malinay Angeles (born 9 January 1991) is a professional footballer who plays as a midfielder for Philippines Football League club United City F.C. Born in Italy, he represented the Philippines national football team.

== Career ==
=== Global FC ===
Angeles joined Global in 2012. He returned to Global in 2018 after his Ceres Stint.

=== Ceres FC ===
In 2014, He joined Ceres FC.

=== Green Archers United FC ===
Angeles joined Green Archers United in 2019. He scored twice in a 3–0 victory against Philippine Air Force FC

=== Azkals Development Team ===
Angeles was included in ADT squad for the 2020 PFL season.

=== Stallion FC ===
in 2022 Stallion signs veteran Angeles for the 2022 CPA edition.

=== Davao Aguilas ===
Angeles joined Davao Aguilas in 2023, as they set to joined in 2023 Copa Paulino Alcantara and returned to pro football. Angeles scored an equalizer against Mendiola United F.C. at 2023 CPA.

=== United City FC ===
In 2024, he joined UCFC after his Davao Aguilas stint.

== International career ==
Angeles represented the Philippines national football team in 2012.
