= Chester Pabualan =

Filipino footballer

Personal information
- Full name: Chester Gio Angeles Pabualan
- Date of birth: April 29, 1999 (age 27)
- Place of birth: Manolo Fortich, Bukidnon, Philippines
- Height: 1.65 m (5 ft 5 in)
- Position: Winger

Team information
- Current team: United City
- Number: 25

Youth career
- Del Monte School
- 2015–2018: FEU Baby Tamaraws

College career
Years	Team	Apps	(Gls)
2019–2023	Far Eastern University		

Senior career*
Years	Team	Apps	(Gls)
2022	Azkals Development Team	8	(1)
2023–2024	Philippine Air Force	0	(0)
2024–	United City	3	(2)

International career^{‡}
2013	Philippines U17	1	(0)
2018	Philippines U19	5	(1)
2023–	Philippines	1	(0)
- * Club domestic league appearances and goals as of 5:35, 5 May 2024 (UTC) ‡ National team caps and goals as of 5:35, August 30, 2023 (UTC)

Chester Gio Angeles Pabualan (born 29 April 1999) is a Filipino professional footballer who plays as a winger for United City and the Philippines national team.

== Personal life ==
Pabualan was born in Manolo Fortich in the province of Bukidnon. Before joining FEU, he played high school football for Del Monte School in Manolo Fortich. His favorite footballers are Cristiano Ronaldo and Mesut Özil.

== Career ==
=== Far Eastern University ===
In 2015, Pabualan played for the High School team of Far Eastern University nicknamed the Baby Tamaraws, winning 4 straight UAAP titles while winning multiple MVPs, Best Midfielder, and Best Striker awards. At the 2016 Palarong Pambansa, he won Gold with the NCR region. In 2019, he joined the college team of FEU.

While also playing for the ADT of the Philippines Football League, he captained them to their first UAAP title in 8 years in 2023, winning the awards for both best striker and best midfielder, and finishing as the tournament's top scorer with 8 goals. In a single game against University of the East, he notched 5 goal contributions, scoring two and assisting three.

=== Azkals Development Team ===
In 2022, he signed with the Azkals Development Team of the PFL, since the UAAP had yet to resume after being cancelled due to the COVID-19 pandemic in early 2020. He made his debut in the club's opening match in the 2022 Copa Paulino Alcantara, a 3–0 win over Mendiola 1991. He would go on to stay with the club despite a number of changes due to a change in ownership before the 2022–23 PFL season, scoring his first goal in a 4–0 win over Maharlika Manila.

=== Philippine Air Force ===
In 2023, after finishing his college career with FEU, he joined former UFL champions and current Ang Liga side Philippine Air Force, suiting up alongside former Azkals players like Yanti Barsales. He made his debut in the opening match of the cup, a 1–0 win over Don Bosco Garelli.

== International career ==
=== Philippines U17 ===
Before officially playing for the youth teams of the Philippines, Pabualan was part of a group nicknamed the "Little Azkals" that had training camps in other countries, with players that were meant to be the future of the Philippine team. He officially played for the Philippines U17 in the 2013 AFF U16 Championship, making his debut in a 6–0 loss to Myanmar as a substitute in the 57th minute.

=== Philippines U19 ===
Pabualan was called up again, this time to the Philippines U19, for the 2018 AFF U19 Championship in Surabaya. He played all five matches, and scored a free kick to put the Philippines ahead against Indonesia before eventually succumbing 5–1.

=== Philippines ===
Pabualan was first called up to the Philippines senior team in November 2022, when he was part of the provisional squad for the 2022 AFF Championship, though he did not make the cut. In June 2023, he was called up by returning Azkals coach Michael Weiß for the Azkals' friendlies against Nepal and Chinese Taipei, making his debut in the second half against the latter, replacing Jarvey Gayoso in the 2nd half.
