= 2023 Ang Liga season =

19th season of Ang Liga

Ang Liga Season 19

Tournament details
- Country: Philippines
- Dates: August 13 – November 4, 2023
- Teams: 12

Final positions
- Champions: Adamson Soaring Falcons (1st title)
- Runners-up: Ateneo Blue Eagles
- Third place: Benilde Blazers

Tournament statistics
- Matches played: 23
- Goals scored: 112 (4.87 per match)
- Top goal scorer(s): Isaac Anoh; Clyde Vitualla (7 goals each)

The 2023 Ang Liga season was the nineteenth edition of Ang Liga, an inter-collegiate pre-season football tournament in the Philippines. This was the first season of Ang Liga under the sponsorship of Adidas. The season started on August 13, 2023, and concluded on November 4, 2023. The league's first division was contested by twelve teams, while each team played a minimum of 5 matches in total, the most since the 2019 season.

On July 24, the league announced that matches would be held at the new PALMS Arena in Quezon City. However, due to issues with the field, all Division 1 matches were held at the UP Diliman Football Field.

The league's return to an all-collegiate lineup of teams marked the end of its temporary admission of guest teams back in Season 18, where non-collegiate club teams participated due to a lack of entrants following the pandemic.

This season marked the first championship of the Adamson Soaring Falcons and the first time that the Ateneo Blue Eagles clinched a finals berth since 2016. The league partnered with the FPJ Panday Bayanihan foundation throughout the entirety of the season while Adidas was the title sponsor of the knockout round.

== Participating teams ==
All collegiate squads from the previous season, with the exception of the University of Makati, returned for the nineteenth edition of the league. This includes the Ateneo de Manila University, De La Salle University, De La Salle–College of Saint Benilde, Far Eastern University, and the University of Batangas.

Twelve teams entered the 2023 Ang Liga season's first division (collegiate). This includes seven teams from the UAAP, three teams from the NCAA, one team from the NCAA South, and one unattached team. On the other hand, twelve teams also entered for the season's second division (high school and secondary teams).

=== Division I ===
UAAP; 7 teams	NCAA; 3 teams	Other schools 2 teams
Adamson University; Ateneo de Manila University; De La Salle University; Far Eastern University; University of the East; University of the Philippines; University of Santo Tomas	De La Salle–College of Saint Benilde; Emilio Aguinaldo College; San Beda University	Mapúa Malayan Colleges Laguna; University of Batangas

=== Division II ===
UAAP; 4 teams	NCAA; 3 teams	Other schools 5 teams
Adamson University – B; Ateneo de Manila – High School; De La Salle University – B; University of Santo Tomas – High School	La Salle Green Hills; University of Perpetual Help System DALTA; San Beda University – High School	Claret School of Quezon City; De La Salle Lipa; De La Salle University – Integrated School; PAREF Southridge School; Xavier School

== Venues ==
Venues within Metro Manila.

In contrast to the previous season, which was held between FEU Diliman and DLSU Integrated School in Biñan, all first division matches were held at the UP Diliman Football Pitch, the same stadium where the UAAP Season 85 group stage matches were held. Fixtures were initially slated to be played at the newly opened PALMS Arena in Quezon City, but following issues with the pitch which resulted in the season opening date being pushed back, the venue remained unused for the rest of the season.

For the second division matches, the DLSU Biñan pitch was used in rotation with new venues around Metro Manila.

Stadium	Location	Tournament	
Stadium	Location	D1	D2
UP Diliman Football Field	Quezon City	check	check
Claret Football Field	Quezon City		check
Xavier School Football Field	San Juan City		check
La Salle Green Hills Football Field	Mandaluyong		check
DLSU Biñan Football Field	Biñan, Laguna		check

== Division I ==
=== Group stage ===
==== Group A ====
Pos	Team	Pld	W	D	L	GF	GA	GD	Pts	Qualification
1	De La Salle University	5	4	0	1	10	3	+7	12	Qualified to the semifinals
2	Adamson University	5	4	0	1	10	3	+7	12	Qualified to the semifinals
3	San Beda University	5	3	1	1	5	3	+2	10	Qualified to the semifinals
4	De La Salle–College of Saint Benilde	5	1	2	2	3	2	+1	5	Qualified to the semifinals
5	Emilio Aguinaldo College	5	1	1	3	3	10	−7	4	
6	University of Batangas	5	0	0	5	5	15	−10	0	

Updated to match(es) played on October 20, 2023. Source: Ang Liga

==== Group B ====
Pos	Team	Pld	W	D	L	GF	GA	GD	Pts	Qualification
1	University of Santo Tomas	5	3	2	0	15	5	+10	11	Qualified to the semifinals
2	Ateneo de Manila University	5	3	2	0	13	7	+6	11	Qualified to the semifinals
3	University of the East	5	2	2	1	7	8	−1	8	Qualified to the semifinals
4	University of the Philippines	5	2	1	2	7	7	0	7	Qualified to the semifinals
5	Far Eastern University	5	0	3	2	5	13	−8	3	
6	Mapúa Malayan Colleges Laguna	5	0	1	4	5	12	−7	1	

Updated to match(es) played on October 20, 2023. Source: Ang Liga

=== Knock-out stage ===
Quarterfinals
A1	La Salle	0(3)
B4	UP	0(2)
B2	Ateneo	4
A3	San Beda	3
B1	UST	3
A4	Benilde	4
A2	Adamson	1
B3	UE	0

Semifinals
A1	La Salle	0
B2	Ateneo	2
A4	Benilde	0
A2	Adamson	2

Finals
B2	Ateneo	0
A2	Adamson	2
Third place
A1	La Salle	2(2)
A4	Benilde	2(4)

==== Quarterfinals ====
21 October 2023
1:00 p.m.

UE Red Warriors	0–1	Adamson Soaring Falcons
		Buenaobra 84'

UP Diliman Football Field, Quezon City

21 October 2023
3:00 p.m.

UST Golden Booters	3–4	Benilde Blazers
Belluga 33'; Valderama 87'; Alegre 90+1'	Report	Borja 12'; Tolentino 57'; Vitualla 64'; Semilla 84'

UP Diliman Football Field, Quezon City

22 October 2023
1:00 p.m.

Ateneo Blue Eagles	4–3	San Beda Red Booters
Agyei 12'; Agyei 49'; Abaa 55'; Maquiling 70'	Report	Reña 8'; Mapula 74'; Encaya 84'

UP Diliman Football Field, Quezon City

22 October 2023
3:00 p.m.

UP Fighting Maroons	0–0 (a.e.t.)	De La Salle Green Booters
	Report
Penalties
Parpan (penalty scored); Calayag (penalty missed); Evangelista (penalty scored); Regino (penalty missed); Velasquez (penalty missed)	2–3	(penalty missed) Andan; (penalty scored) Suarez; (penalty scored) Lozano; (penalty missed) Vecin; (penalty scored) Dela Cruz

UP Diliman Football Field, Quezon City

==== Semifinals ====
28 October 2023
12:30 p.m.

Adamson Soaring Falcons	2–0	Benilde Blazers
Jayaon 38'; Jayaon 45'

UP Diliman Football Field, Quezon City

28 October 2023
3:00 p.m.

Ateneo Blue Eagles	2–0	De La Salle Green Booters
Maquiling 37'; Aspiras 45+1'	Report

UP Diliman Football Field, Quezon City

==== Battle for Third ====
4 November 2023
12:30 p.m.

De La Salle Green Booters	2–2 (a.e.t.)	Benilde Blazers
Elnas 14'; Elnas 39'		Vitualla 50'; Vitualla 76'
Penalties
	2–4

UP Diliman Football Field, Quezon City

==== Finals ====
4 November 2023
3:00 p.m.

Adamson Soaring Falcons	2–0	Ateneo Blue Eagles
Jayaon 45+2'; Jayaon 90+10'	Report

UP Diliman Football Field, Quezon City

=== Final standing ===
Rank	Team
1st place, gold medalist(s)	Adamson Soaring Falcons
2nd place, silver medalist(s)	Ateneo Blue Eagles
3rd place, bronze medalist(s)	Benilde Blazers
4	De La Salle Green Booters
5	UST Golden Booters
6	San Beda Red Booters
7	UE Red Warriors
8	UP Fighting Maroons
9	EAC Generals
10	FEU Tamaraw Booters
11	MMCL Wizards
12	UB Brahmans

2023 Ang Liga Division 1 champions
Adamson Soaring Falcons
1st title

== Division II ==
=== Final standing ===
Rank	Team
1st place, gold medalist(s)	UST Junior Golden Booters
2nd place, silver medalist(s)	San Beda Red Cubs
3rd place, bronze medalist(s)	De La Salle Green Booters – 2
4	Adamson Soaring Falcons – 2

== Awards ==
=== Individual awards ===
Award	Player/s	Team	Ref
Golden Glove	Andrew Nalog	Adamson Soaring Falcons	
Golden Ball	Leo Maquiling	Ateneo Blue Eagles	
Golden Boot	Isaac Anoh	De La Salle Green Booters	
Golden Boot	John Clyde Vitualla	Benilde Blazers	
Best Defender	Arjay Buenaobra	Adamson Soaring Falcons	
Best Coach	Darlton Digha	Adamson Soaring Falcons	

=== Team of the Tournament ===
Award	Player	Team	Ref
Keeper	Andrew Nalog	Adamson Soaring Falcons	
Defenders	Arjay Buenaobra	Adamson Soaring Falcons	
Defenders	Dexter John Chasing	Adamson Soaring Falcons	
Defenders	Jethro Flores	Ateneo Blue Eagles	
Defenders	Jet Gabriel Dela Cruz	Ateneo Blue Eagles	
Midfielders	Leo Maquiling	Ateneo Blue Eagles	
Midfielders	Fernando Suarez	De La Salle Green Booters	
Midfielders	Roque Empledo	Adamson Soaring Falcons	
Forwards	Kofi Agyei	Ateneo Blue Eagles	
Forwards	Isaac Anoh	De La Salle Green Booters	
Forwards	John Clyde Vitualla	Benilde Blazers	

== Media ==
For the first time, the league inked a one-year deal with a broadcast partner, as all Division 1 matches were broadcast and livestreamed via Smart Sports. Meanwhile, Division 2 matches were sporadically streamed on the league's page.

Sports commentators

- Patrick Maramara
- Paolo del Rosario
- Luis Licas
- Ivan Gayares
- Denis Lucindo

== See also ==
- UAAP Season 86
