= Ang Liga =

- Organiser(s): Karl Francis M. Tan; Patrick Maramara; Paolo Del Rosario
- Founded: 2003; 23 years ago
- Region: Philippines
- Teams: 12 (Division 1); 12 (Division 2)
- Current champions: Men's Open: Philippine Air Force; Division 1: Adamson University
- Most championships: De La Salle University; San Beda University (2 titles each)

Ang Liga (transl. The League) is an inter-collegiate football tournament based in the Philippines. It serves as a pre-season tourney for competing football varsity teams from the National Collegiate Athletic Association (NCAA), UAAP and other similar collegiate leagues, before the regular football tournaments begin within the second semester of the academic year.

Ang Liga, was founded in 2003 by Philippine Football Federation (PFF) Technical Director and Philippines national football team assistant coach Jose Ariston Caslib and Marlon Maro, who served as the head coach of the Philippines national under-23 football team.

The league changed the tournament format in 2015. 12 collegiate teams were placed under the first division and divided into two groups for the elimination round, while the remaining 7 teams played in the second division. The top four teams from the two groups moved on in the knock-out quarterfinals, while the top four teams of the second division advanced into the semifinals.

The tournament now caters to Men's Open, Women's (Ang Liga Filipina), Men's U19, among others.

It is currently being organized by Karl Francis M. Tan, Patrick Maramara and Paolo Del Rosario.

== Tournament results ==
Key
*	Match was won on a penalty shoot-out

=== Division I ===
Season	Finals			Third-place game		
Season	Champion	Score	Final opponent	Third place	Score	Fourth place
11 (2013)	San Beda (NCAA)	3–2	Benilde (NCAA)	No third place game		
12 (2014)	UP (UAAP)	1–0	UE (UAAP)	No third place game		
13 (2015)	FEU (UAAP)	3–0	UP (UAAP)	Ateneo (UAAP)		San Beda (NCAA)
14 (2016)	UST (UAAP)	1–0	Ateneo (UAAP)	No third place game		
15 (2017)	San Beda (NCAA)	2–0	UP (UAAP)	NU (UAAP)		LPU (NCAA)
16 (2018)	La Salle (UAAP)	5–4	Benilde (NCAA)	UST (UAAP)	4–1	UP (UAAP)
17 (2019)	Tournament abandoned due to COVID-19 pandemic			Tournament abandoned due to COVID-19 pandemic		
18 (2022)	La Salle–B (UAAP)	1–1 (5–4)^{*}	Air Force (PFL)	FEU (UAAP)	4–2	Ateneo (UAAP)
19 (2023)	Adamson (UAAP)	2–0	Ateneo (UAAP)	Benilde (NCAA)	0–0 (4–2)^{*}	La Salle (UAAP)

=== Division II ===
Season	Champion
15	NU Nazareth School (UAAP)
16	La Salle Green Hills (NCAA)
18	Army
19	UST High School (UAAP)

=== Men's Open ===
Season	Champion
2024-25	DB Garelli United
2025	Philippine Air Force
