= Diego Aspiras =

Filipino footballer (born 2004)

Personal information
- Full name: Jose Diego Aspiras
- Date of birth: May 28, 2004 (age 22)
- Place of birth: Philippines
- Height: 1.77 m (5 ft 10 in)
- Position: Defensive midfielder

Team information
- Current team: One Taguig
- Number: 41

Youth career
- 2011–2021: Kaya–Iloilo
- 2021–2023: GOM Academy
- 2023–2024: Stallion Laguna

College career
Years	Team	Apps	(Gls)
- Ateneo de Manila University

Senior career*
Years	Team	Apps	(Gls)
2024	United City	9	(0)
2024	Manila Digger	6	(0)
2025	PFF Youth NT	9	(0)
2025	Barcelona City		
2025–2026	Aguilas–UMak	6	(0)
2026–	One Taguig	1	(0)
- * Club domestic league appearances and goals

Jose Diego Aspiras (born May 28, 2004) is a Filipino professional footballer who plays as a defensive midfielder for Philippine club One Taguig.

== Personal life ==
Born on May 28, 2004 , Aspiras is the son of Filipino actor and politician Edu Manzano and celebrity chef Reggie Aspiras. While playing football as a kid he studied at Xavier School, and is studying in Ateneo de Manila University as of October 2024.

== Youth career ==
In 2011, Aspiras began playing football for the academy of Kaya FC, a club then participating in the United Football League. He was a member of the club's under 11 team and continued to play for them until 2021. While playing for Kaya, he also played high school football for Xavier School. He would also play for the youth team of Stallion Laguna in the PFF U19 Boys National Championship.

Aspiras also played college football for Ateneo, first playing in the intercollegiate 2023 Ang Liga Tournament, where Ateneo reached the final before losing to Adamson University. He did not play in the University Athletic Association of the Philippines.

== Club career ==
=== United City ===
Before the 2024 edition of the Philippines Football League, Aspiras signed his first professional contract with league giants United City, who were returning to the league after a two-year break. He made his debut on the third matchday, coming on for Ricardo Sendra in a 4–1 win over Philippine Air Force. He notched 9 appearances during the shortened season, also assisting Sendra in a 9–2 win against Maharlika Taguig.

=== Manila Digger ===
After the conclusion of the 2024 season, Aspiras was left without a club after United City withdrew from the league due to financial difficulties. He later signed with Manila Digger, featuring in the starting eleven on the first day as they lost 3–1 to One Taguig.

=== Barcelona City ===
In April 2025, Barcelona City of the Quarta Catalana announced that it have signed in Aspiras for its then ongoing 2024–25 season. Ramon Tribulietx, his coach back in United City, helped realize Aspiras' move to the club-academy which was founded in 2024. Barcelona City lost their promotion match which marked the end of Aspiras' three-month stint with the club.

=== Aguilas–UMak ===
Aspiras returned to the Philippines to join the Aguilas–UMak F.C. of the PFL for the 2025–26 season.
