= Kintaro Miyagi =

Filipino footballer

Personal information
- Full name: Kintaro Miyagi
- Date of birth: April 14, 1998 (age 28)
- Place of birth: Tokyo, Japan
- Position: Forward

Team information
- Current team: Maharlika
- Number: 24

Youth career
- –2015: Sacred Heart School – Ateneo de Cebu

College career
Years	Team	Apps	(Gls)
2015–2020	University of the Philippines		

Senior career*
Years	Team	Apps	(Gls)
2021–2024	Cebu	24	(3)
2024–2025	Manila Digger	6	(0)
2025–	Maharlika	8	(1)

International career^{‡}
2011	Philippines U14		
2012	Philippines U15		
2013	Philippines U16		
2016	Philippines U19		
2017–	Philippines	3	(1)
- * Club domestic league appearances and goals as of 11 March 2026 ‡ National team caps and goals as of 5 December 2017

Kintaro Miyagi (born April 14, 1998) is a Filipino professional footballer who plays as a forward for Philippines Football League club Maharlika. He has played for the Philippines national football team.

== Amateur career ==
=== Youth ===
While attending Sacred Heart School-Ateneo de Cebu, Miyagi played for the Magis Eagles his school's varsity team which he helped win various titles. He was also represented Mandaue in local inter-city tournaments as well as Central Visayas in regional meets such as the Palarong Pambansa.

=== Collegiate career ===
He decided to move to Metro Manila from Cebu after he graduated from high school to study at the University of the Philippines Diliman to take up a bachelor's degree in Physical Education. The university's football head coach, Anto Gonzales offered him a scholarship to study at the school so he could become part of UP's football team. Miyagi helped lead the Maroons to two UAAP Football Championship titles in Seasons 78 and 80, as well as four Philippine University Games (Unigames) championships, before deciding to forgo his final collegiate playing year to pursue a football career professionally.

== Professional career ==
Miyagi was signed by his hometown Philippines Football League club Cebu F.C., who are to make their debut in 2021.

== International ==
Miyagi became part of the youth program of the Philippine national team in 2011. He was part of the country's U13/U14 squad representing the country in youth tournaments. He played as a defender as a national youth player. As part of the U15 team which was coached by Anto Gonzales, he played at the 2013 Football Association of Malaysia (FAM)-Frenz U-15 ASEAN Champions Trophy. In 2016, he was part of the U19 squad coached by Dan Padernal for the 2016 AFC U-19 Championship qualifiers.

His first call up to the senior national team was in 2017. He was part of a squad which participated at the 2017 CTFA International Tournament, a friendly tournament in Taiwan. The national team is led by Marlon Maro in lieu of regular coach, Thomas Dooley since the national federation was supposed to send an under-23 team which Maro coaches.

Miyagi earned his first cap in the 3–1 win against Laos on December 1, 2017. He came in as a substitute for Phil Younghusband in the 70th minute. Playing for the senior team as a striker, Miyagi scored the third goal for the Philippines in the 81st minute.
