= Julian Clarino =

Filipino footballer

Personal information
- Full name: Julian Mariano Noda Clarino
- Date of birth: August 15, 1995 (age 31)
- Place of birth: San Juan, Metro Manila, Philippines
- Height: 1.77 m (5 ft 10 in)
- Positions: Center back; left back

Team information
- Current team: Bulli

College career
Years	Team	Apps	(Gls)
- University of the Philippines

Senior career*
Years	Team	Apps	(Gls)
2015–2016	Global	1	(0)
2016–2018	Meralco Manila	5	(0)
2018–2019	Davao Aguilas	0	(0)
2019	Stallion Laguna	0	(0)
2020–	Bulli	0	(0)

International career^{‡}
2014	Philippines U21	4	(0)
2015–2018	Philippines U23	22	(0)
2017–2018	Philippines	6	(0)
- * Club domestic league appearances and goals as of 07:05, August 25, 2019 (UTC) ‡ National team caps and goals as of 07:41, August 25, 2019 (UTC)

Julian Mariano Noda Clarino (born August 15, 1995) is a Filipino professional footballer who plays as a defender for Illawarra Premier League club Bulli and the Philippines national team.

== Collegiate career ==
Clarino played for the football team of his college, University of the Philippines Diliman in the UAAP. The team was mentored by Anto Gonzales.

== Club career ==
=== Global ===
Together with his brother OJ, Clarino played for Global in the 2015 United Football League season.

Clarino made his league debut for Global in a 6–0 victory against Team Socceroo coming in as a substitute, replacing Izzeldin El Habib in the 88th minute of the match.

=== Meralco Manila ===
In 2016, Clarino was released by Global, he then joined fellow United Football League club, Meralco Manila (formerly Loyola Meralco Sparks).

Clarino made his debut for Meralco in an 11–0 victory against Agila MSA playing the whole 90 minutes.

In January 2018, it was announced that Meralco Manila have ceased operations. The management stated that they attempted to find investors to keep the club running but were unable to do so.

=== Davao Aguilas ===
In July 2018, during the mid-season transfer window, Clarino signed for Mindanao-based Philippines Football League club Davao Aguilas.

After the 2018 season, it was reported on December 14, 2018, that Davao Aguilas has withdrawn from the PFL. Reasons for the withdrawal is yet to be officially disclosed by club owner Jefferson Cheng who iterated continued support for infrastructure and grassroots development in Davao. He is set to discuss with the club's stakeholders over the fate of the club itself. Cheng has also cited the decision to hire Bernie Sumayao to manage the PFL despite his volunteering to take over the management of the league.

=== Stallion Laguna ===
In January 2019, Clarino joined Stallion Laguna after the folding of Davao Aguilas.

== International career ==
=== Philippines U-21 ===
In August 2014, Clarino received a call-up for Philippines U-21 to compete at the 2014 Hassanal Bolkiah Trophy that was held in Brunei.

=== Philippines U-23 ===
In March 2015, Clarino received a call-up for Philippines U-23 to compete at the 2016 AFC U-23 Championship qualification that was held in Thailand. On 31 March 2015, he made his debut for the Philippines U-23 team in a 3–1 defeat against Cambodia U-23.

Clarino was part of the Philippines U-23 squad that competed in the 2015 SEA Games.

In July 2017, Clarino received a call-up for Philippines U-23 to compete at the 2018 AFC U-23 Championship qualification that was held in Cambodia.

Clarino was part of the Philippines U-22 squad that competed in the 2017 Southeast Asian Games held in Malaysia. Philippines finished fourth out of six in the group stage and failed to advance to the knockout rounds.

=== Philippines ===
In December 2017, he took part at the 2017 CTFA International Tournament though the squad that played in the friendly tournament in Taiwan was mentored by Marlon Maro in lieu of regular head coach Thomas Dooley. Clarino made his debut for the Philippines in a 3–1 win against Laos.

In October 2018, Clarino was once again called up for the Philippines, he was included in the final 21-man squad that will participate in the 2018 Bangabandhu Cup.
