= Daniel Gadia =

Filipino footballer

Personal information
- Full name: Daniel Bernan Reyes Gadia
- Date of birth: July 3, 1995 (age 31)
- Place of birth: Manila, Philippines
- Position: Defensive midfielder

Team information
- Current team: Cebu
- Number: 6

College career
Years	Team	Apps	(Gls)
2013–2016	University of the Philippines		

Senior career*
Years	Team	Apps	(Gls)
2013–2016	Pachanga Diliman	15	(0)
2016–2018	Meralco Manila	26	(3)
2018	Global Cebu	11	(0)
2018	Davao Aguilas	6	(1)
2019–2020	Stallion Laguna	7	(0)
2021–	Cebu	69	(8)

International career^{‡}
2013	Philippines U19		
2015–2017	Philippines U23	10	(0)
2016–	Philippines	2	(0)
- * Club domestic league appearances and goals as of 11 March 2026 ‡ National team caps and goals as of November 9, 2016

Daniel Bernan Reyes Gadia (born July 3, 1995) is a Filipino professional footballer who plays as a defensive midfielder for Philippines Football League club Cebu and the Philippines national team.

== Early life ==
Daniel Gadia was born to Annaliza and Bernanieto Gadia, and has two other siblings. Gadia was introduced to football in a futsal court in the Dapitan Sports Complex (Dapitan Football Club) in Sampaloc, Manila, where he was scouted by people from his eventual high school. He attended San Beda College, Rizal for his high school studies and entered the University of the Philippines Diliman for his collegiate studies.

== Collegiate career ==
Gadia played for the University of the Philippines Diliman at the UAAP. For his efforts during UAAP Season 78, Gadia was named as the Most Valuable Player for the season. By October 2016, he was already on his last playing year with his collegiate team.

== Club career ==
By 2014, Gadia already had experience playing for Pachanga Diliman at the UFL Cup. In May 2016, Gadia made his league debut at the United Football League for the Loyola Meralco Sparks in a match against Global.

The club then joined the Philippines Football League and changed their name to FC Meralco Manila. They played in the inaugural season in 2017 before the league was dissolved in January 2018, which left Gadia club-less.

Gadia was picked up by Stallion Laguna, playing two years for the club, in 2019 and 2020.

Gadia was signed by expansion club Cebu F.C. for the 2021 season, which would be his second Cebu-based club, after a brief stint with Global Cebu.

== International career ==
=== Youth ===
In 2013, Gadia played for the Philippines U-19 team at the 2013 AFF U-19 Youth Championship and the 2014 AFC U-19 Championship qualifiers. He is credited for the last minute goal against Laos in the AFC qualifiers, which prevented the national team from ending at the bottom of their group.

=== Senior ===
Gadia debuted for the Philippine national football team in a friendly match against Australian club Perth Glory FC in July 2016. However, his first official international cap was made about two months later on October 8, 2016, when he came in as substitute in the 82nd minute for Phil Younghusband in a friendly match against Bahrain. The match ended in a 1–3 defeat.
