= Anto Gonzales =

Filipino footballer

Personal information
- Full name: Andrés Crisanto Santos Gonzales
- Date of birth: 1 May 1981 (age 45)
- Place of birth: Biñan, Laguna
- Height: 1.69 m (5 ft 7 in)
- Position: Midfielder

Senior career*
Years	Team	Apps	(Gls)
2013–2015	Pachanga Diliman		
2012	→ Loyola Meralco Sparks (loan)		
2015–2018	Meralco Manila		

International career
c. 2012	Philippines		

Managerial career
- 2013–2017: University of the Philippines
- 2018: Philippines (Note: Head coach on a temporary basis. Gonzales only coached the team that took part at the 2018 Bangabandhu Cup in Bangladesh which was held in October 2018. Cooper remained the head coach.)
- 2019: Philippines U-22 (assistant)
- * Club domestic league appearances and goals

Andrés Crisanto "Anto" Santos Gonzales is a former Filipino footballer. He is the current head coach of University of the Philippines women's football team.

== Playing career ==
=== Club ===
Gonzales played for Diliman Victory Liner until 2012 when he was loan by Diliman to Loyola Meralco Sparks and played for the club in the 2012 UFL season. Diliman and Loyola agreed that the former will recall Gonzales in the following season if Diliman gets promoted to the 1st division which they managed to do so. Diliman later bought by Pachanga F.C. and became Pachangca Diliman F.C. Gonzales returned to the newly merged club.

On December 7, 2015, Loyola announced that they have signed in Gonzales.

=== International ===
He was also a former player for the Philippine national football team. He was part of the squad that won the 2012 Philippine Peace Cup.

== Coaching career ==
Gonzales coaches both the men's and women's team of the University of the Philippines since at least UAAP 76. In 2016 at UAAP Season 78, he led both the women's and men's team of UP to win the UAAP Championships. The 2016 win of the women's team under his watch was the first ever for the squad in their history in playing at UAAP.

In 2019, Gonzales was appointed as assistant coach of the Philippines U-23.

== Career as an educator ==
In November 2012, it was reported that Gonzales is teaching at the Physical Education and Sports Science subjects at the UP College of Human Kinetics simultaneously while playing competitively and coaching in football.
