= 2021–22 Muangthong United F.C. season =

Muangthong United
2021–22 season
- Chairman: Wilak Lohtong
- Manager: Mario Gjurovski
- Stadium: Thunderdome Stadium, Pak Kret, Nonthaburi, Thailand
Home colours	Away colours	Third colours

The 2021–22 season is Muangthong United Football Club's 15th existence in the new era since they took over from Nongchok Pittaya Nusorn Football Club in 2007. It is the fifth season in the Thai League and the club's 13th consecutive season in the top flight of the Thai football league system since promoted in the 2009 season.

== Squad ==
As of 4 January 2022

Squad No.	Name	Nationality	Date of birth (age)	Previous club
Goalkeepers
1	Somporn Yos (3rd captain)	(Thailand)	23 June 1993 (age 33)	(Thailand) PT Prachuap F.C.
30	Peerapong Ruennin	(Thailand)	14 September 1995 (age 30)	(Thailand) Sukhothai F.C.
Defenders
2	Jesper Nyholm	(Philippines)	10 September 1993 (age 32)	(Sweden) Djurgården
3	Lucas Rocha (4th captain)	(Brazil)	19 June 1995 (age 31)	(Brazil) Atlético Clube Goianiense
4	Chatchai Saengdao	(Thailand)	11 January 1997 (age 29)	(Thailand) Udon Thani F.C.
5	Suporn Peenagatapho (Captain)	(Thailand)	12 July 1995 (age 30)	(Thailand) BEC Tero F.C.
23	Marco Ballini	(Thailand)	12 June 1998 (age 28)	(Thailand) Chainat Hornbill F.C.
33	Wattanakorn Sawatlakhorn	(Thailand)	23 May 1998 (age 28)	(Thailand) Bangkok F.C.
39	Boontawee Theppawong	(Thailand)	2 January 1996 (age 30)	Youth team
45	Chutikom Klinjumpasri	(Thailand)	21 June 2002 (age 24)	(Thailand) Bang Pa-in Ayutthaya F.C.
Midfielders
6	Teeraphol Yoryoei	(Thailand)	25 October 1994 (age 31)	(Thailand) Samut Prakan City F.C.
7	Sorawit Panthong	(Thailand)	20 February 1997 (age 29)	(Thailand) Police Tero F.C.
10	Sardor Mirzaev	(Uzbekistan)	21 March 1991 (age 35)	(Uzbekistan) PFC Lokomotiv Tashkent
15	Oliver Granberg	(Thailand)	17 June 2000 (age 26)	(Sweden) Täby FK
18	Weerathep Pomphan	(Thailand)	27 July 1997 (age 28)	(Thailand) Chamchuri United F.C.
21	Purachet Thodsanit	(Thailand)	9 May 2001 (age 25)	(Thailand) Bang Pa-in Ayutthaya F.C.
22	Phumin Kaewta	(Thailand)	12 March 1995 (age 31)	(Thailand) PT Prachuap F.C.
24	Wongsakorn Chaikultewin	(Thailand)	16 September 1996 (age 29)	(Thailand) Nakhon Ratchasima F.C.
32	Atikun Mheetuam	(Thailand)	18 January 1995 (age 31)	(Thailand) Trat F.C.
37	Picha Autra	(Thailand)	7 January 1996 (age 30)	(Thailand) Samut Prakan City F.C.
Strikers
8	Korrawit Tasa	(Thailand)	7 April 2000 (age 26)	(Thailand) Udon Thani F.C.
9	Henri Anier	(Estonia)	17 December 1990 (age 35)	(Estonia) Paide Linnameeskond
19	Willian Popp (vice-captain)	(Brazil)	13 April 1994 (age 32)	(Brazil) Ceará Sporting Club
20	Poramet Arjvirai	(Thailand)	20 July 1998 (age 27)	(Thailand) Bangkok F.C.
Players loaned out / left club during season
-	Korrakot Pipatnadda (GK)	(Thailand)	15 July 1999 (age 26)	Youth team
15	Saringkan Promsupa (D)	(Thailand)	29 March 1997 (age 29)	(Thailand) Rayong F.C.
16	Patcharapol Intanee (D)	(Thailand)	12 October 1998 (age 27)	(Thailand) Udon Thani F.C.
-	Sundy Wongderree (D)	(Thailand)	27 May 1998 (age 28)	(Thailand) Trat F.C.
-	Rittiporn Wanchuen (M)	(Thailand)	30 August 1995 (age 30)	(Thailand) Suphanburi F.C.
-	Petch Laohaserikul (D)	(Thailand)	17 February 1998 (age 28)	Youth team
-	Sakunchai Saengthopho (D)	(Thailand)	7 June 1999 (age 27)	(Thailand) Suphanburi F.C.
-	Saharat Kanyaroj (M)	(Thailand)	9 June 1994 (age 32)	(Thailand) Rayong F.C.
-	Chayapol Supma (D)	(Thailand)	6 February 1997 (age 29)	(Thailand) Suphanburi F.C.
-	Petcharat Chotipala (D)	(Thailand)	20 December 1997 (age 28)	Youth team
-	Sihanart Sutisuk (F)	(Thailand)	30 January 1997 (age 29)	(Thailand) Udon Thani F.C.
-	Phituckchai Limraksa (M)	(Thailand)	27 March 1997 (age 29)	(Thailand) Udon Thani F.C.
-	Reungyos Janchaichit (M)	(Thailand)	20 July 1998 (age 27)	(Thailand) Udon Thani F.C.
-	Marut Budrak (D)	(Thailand)	21 May 1998 (age 28)	(Thailand) Bang Pa-in Ayutthaya F.C.
-	Maximilian Steinbauer (D)	(Germany)	29 April 2001 (age 25)	(Germany) Tennis Borussia Berlin
14	Peerapong Panyanumaporn (M)	(Thailand)	1 June 1996 (age 30)	(Thailand) Suphanburi F.C.
11	Adisak Kraisorn (F)	(Thailand)	1 February 1991 (age 35)	(Thailand) Port F.C.
31	Chaloempat Ploywanrattana (GK)	(Thailand)	6 June 1999 (age 27)	Youth team
17	Jesse Curran (M)	(Australia)	16 July 1996 (age 29)	(Thailand) Nakhon Ratchasima F.C.

== Transfer ==
=== In ===
Pre-season transfer

Position	Player	Transferred From	Ref
GK	(Thailand) Peerapong Ruennin	(Thailand) Sukhothai F.C.	Undisclosed
MF	(Thailand) Teeraphol Yoryoei	(Thailand) Samut Prakan City F.C.	THB3m

Mid-season transfer

Position	Player	Transferred From	Ref
DF	(Philippines) Jesper Nyholm	(Sweden) Djurgården	Free. 3 years contract signed in 2021 till 2024
MF	(Thailand) Oliver Granberg	(Sweden) Täby FK	Undisclosed
FW	(Estonia) Henri Anier	(Estonia) Paide Linnameeskond	Undisclosed

=== Out ===
Preseason

Position	Player	Transferred To	Ref
GK	(Thailand) Kampol Pathom-attakul	(Thailand) Ratchaburi F.C.	Undisclosed
GK	(Thailand) Kittipun Saensuk	(Thailand) Sukhothai F.C.	Undisclosed
DF	(Thailand) Sarawut Kanlayanabandit	(Thailand) Port F.C.	Loan return
DF	(Thailand) Kittipong Sansanit	(Thailand) Samut Prakan City F.C.	Undisclosed
DF	(Philippines) Daisuke Sato	(Thailand) Suphanburi F.C.	Free
MF	(Thailand) Chatmongkol Thongkiri	(Thailand) Port F.C.	Loan return
MF	(Thailand) Wattana Playnum	(Thailand) Uthai Thani F.C.	Undisclosed
FW	(Brazil) Derley	(Thailand) Ratchaburi F.C.	Free

Mid-season

Position	Player	Transferred To	Ref
MF	(Philippines) (Australia) Jesse Curran	(Philippines) Kaya FC	Free

=== Loan Out ===
Preseason

Position	Player	Transferred From	Ref
GK	(Thailand) Korrakot Pipatnadda	(Thailand) Trat F.C.	Season loan
GK	(Thailand) Soponwit Rakyart	(Thailand) Bang Pa-in Ayutthaya	Season loan
DF	(Thailand) Sakunchai Saengthopho	(Thailand) Kasetsart F.C.	Season loan
DF	(Thailand) Sundy Wongderree	(Thailand) Kasetsart F.C.	Season loan
DF	(Thailand) Petcharat Chotipala	(Thailand) Kasetsart F.C.	Season loan
DF	(Thailand) Marut Budrak	(Thailand) Kasetsart F.C.	Season loan
DF	(Thailand) Atikun Mheetuam	(Thailand) Trat F.C.	Season loan
DF	(Thailand) Petch Laohaserikul	(Thailand) Ayutthaya United F.C.	Season loan
DF	(Thailand) Chayapol Supma	(Thailand) Suphanburi F.C.	Season loan
DF	(Germany) Maximilian Steinbauer	(Thailand) Sukhothai F.C.	Season loan
DF	(Thailand) Anuwat Phikulsri	(Thailand) Bang Pa-in Ayutthaya	Season loan
DF	(Thailand) Rachata Somporn	(Thailand) Bang Pa-in Ayutthaya	Season loan
DF	(Thailand) Siwakorn Manjitt	(Thailand) Bang Pa-in Ayutthaya	Season loan
DF	(Thailand) Phuwadol Chanokkawinkul	(Thailand) Bang Pa-in Ayutthaya	Season loan
DF	(Thailand) Theerapat Laohabut	(Thailand) Bang Pa-in Ayutthaya	Season loan
DF	(Thailand) Thanakorn Phramdech	(Thailand) Bang Pa-in Ayutthaya	Season loan
DF	(Thailand) Saranyu Plangwal	(Thailand) Bang Pa-in Ayutthaya	Season loan
DF	(Thailand) Songwut Kraikruan	(Thailand) Bang Pa-in Ayutthaya	Season loan
MF	(Thailand) Phituckchai Limraksa	(Thailand) Trat F.C.	Season loan
MF	(Thailand) Reungyos Janchaichit	(Thailand) Trat F.C.	Season loan
MF	(Thailand) Saharat Kanyaroj	(Thailand) Chiangmai United F.C.	Season loan
MF	(Thailand) Manat Maungman	(Thailand) Udon Thani F.C.	Season loan
MF	(Thailand) Rittiporn Wanchuen	(Thailand) Suphanburi F.C.	Season loan
MF	(Thailand) Thatchapol Chai-yan	(Thailand) Bang Pa-in Ayutthaya	Season loan
MF	(Thailand) Chananon Wisetbamrungcharoen	(Thailand) Bang Pa-in Ayutthaya	Season loan
MF	(Thailand) Jessadakorn Noysri	(Thailand) Bang Pa-in Ayutthaya	Season loan
MF	(Thailand) Wuttisak Srichai	(Thailand) Bang Pa-in Ayutthaya	Season loan
MF	(Thailand) Naravit Kaosanthiah	(Thailand) Bang Pa-in Ayutthaya	Season loan
FW	(Thailand) Chanayut Srisawat	(Thailand) Bang Pa-in Ayutthaya	Season loan
FW	(Thailand) Adtaphol Chaikol	(Thailand) Bang Pa-in Ayutthaya	Season loan
FW	(Thailand) Sihanart Sutisuk	(Thailand) Suphanburi F.C.	Season loan

Mid-Season

Position	Player	Transferred To	Ref
DF	(Thailand) Patcharapol Intanee	(Thailand) Suphanburi F.C.	Season loan
FW	(Thailand) Sihanart Sutisuk	(Thailand) Trat F.C.	Season loan
DF	(Thailand) Chayapol Supma	(Thailand) Trat F.C.	Season loan
MF	(Thailand) Peerapong Panyanumaporn	(Thailand) Trat F.C.	Season loan
GK	(Thailand) Chaloempat Ploywanrattana	(Thailand) Ayutthaya United F.C.	Season loan
DF	(Thailand) Saringkan Promsupa	(Thailand) Suphanburi F.C.	Season loan
FW	(Thailand) Adisak Kraisorn	(Thailand) Port	Season loan

=== Return from loan ===
Preseason

Position	Player	Transferred from	Ref
GK	(Thailand) Kittipun Saensuk	(Thailand) Chainat Hornbill F.C.	Loan return
GK	(Thailand) Ittikorn Kansrang	(Thailand) Udon Thani F.C.	Loan return
GK	(Thailand) Soponwit Rakyart	(Thailand) Bang Pa-in Ayutthaya	Loan return
GK	(Thailand) Chaloempat Ploywanrattana	(Thailand) Bang Pa-in Ayutthaya	Loan return
GK	(Thailand) Kampol Pathom-attakul	(Thailand) Ratchaburi F.C.	Loan return
GK	(Thailand) Thirawooth Sraunson	(Thailand) Kasetsart F.C.	Loan return
DF	(Thailand) Atikun Mheetuam	(Thailand) Trat F.C.	Loan return
DF	(Australia) Jesse Curran	(Thailand) Nakhon Ratchasima F.C.	Loan return
DF	(Thailand) Chayapol Supma	(Thailand) Suphanburi F.C.	Loan return
DF	(Thailand) Rachata Somporn	(Thailand) Bang Pa-in Ayutthaya	Loan return
DF	(Thailand) Siwakorn Manjitt	(Thailand) Bang Pa-in Ayutthaya	Loan return
DF	(Thailand) Phuwadol Chanokkawinkul	(Thailand) Bang Pa-in Ayutthaya	Loan return
DF	(Thailand) Marut Budrak	(Thailand) Bang Pa-in Ayutthaya	Loan return
DF	(Thailand) Theerapat Laohabut	(Thailand) Bang Pa-in Ayutthaya	Loan return
DF	(Thailand) Thanakorn Phramdech	(Thailand) Bang Pa-in Ayutthaya	Loan return
DF	(Thailand) Anuwat Phikulsri	(Thailand) Bang Pa-in Ayutthaya	Loan return
DF	(Thailand) Ukrit Thiamlert	(Thailand) Udon Thani F.C.	Loan return
DF	(Thailand) Kittipong Sansanit	(Thailand) Udon Thani F.C.	Loan return
DF	(Thailand) Tirapon Thanachartkul	(Thailand) Udon Thani F.C.	Loan return
DF	(Thailand) Boontawee Theppawong	(Thailand) Udon Thani F.C.	Loan return
MF	(Thailand) Rittiporn Wanchuen	(Thailand) Suphanburi F.C.	Loan return
MF	(Thailand) Peerapong Panyanumaporn	(Thailand) Suphanburi F.C.	Loan return
MF	(Thailand) Sakunchai Saengthopho	(Thailand) Suphanburi F.C.	Loan return
MF	(Thailand) Sundy Wongderree	(Thailand) Trat F.C.	Loan return
MF	(Thailand) Phumin Kaewta	(Thailand) PT Prachuap F.C.	Loan return
MF	(Thailand) Naravit Kaosanthiah	(Thailand) Bang Pa-in Ayutthaya	Loan return
MF	(Thailand) Thatchapol Chai-yan	(Thailand) Bang Pa-in Ayutthaya	Loan return
MF	(Thailand) Phituckchai Limraksa	(Thailand) Udon Thani F.C.	Loan return
MF	(Thailand) Reungyos Janchaichit	(Thailand) Udon Thani F.C.	Loan return
MF	(Thailand) Rittiporn Wanchuen	(Thailand) Udon Thani F.C.	Loan return
MF	(Thailand) Tanapat Waempracha	(Thailand) Udon Thani F.C.	Loan return
MF	(Thailand) Nonthawat Klinchampasri	(Thailand) Udon Thani F.C.	Loan return
MF	(Thailand) Manut Muangmun	(Thailand) Udon Thani F.C.	Loan return
MF	(Thailand) Arnont Pumsiri	(Thailand) Udon Thani F.C.	Loan return
MF	(Thailand) Anuwat Piankaew	(Thailand) Udon Thani F.C.	Loan return
MF	(Thailand) Thepwirun Chatkittirot	(Thailand) Udon Thani F.C.	Loan return
MF	(Thailand) Hassawat Nopnate	(Thailand) Udon Thani F.C.	Loan return
FW	(Thailand) Adisak Kraisorn	(Thailand) Port F.C.	Loan return
FW	(Thailand) Sihanart Suttisak	(Thailand) Udon Thani F.C.	Loan return

=== Extension ===
Position	Player	Ref
DF	(Brazil) Lucas Rocha	2 years extension signed in 2021
MF	(Uzbekistan) Sardor Mirzaev	2 years extension signed in 2021

== Friendlies ==
=== Pre-Season Friendly ===
Win Draw Loss

=== In-Season friendlies ===
Win Draw Loss

== Competitions ==
=== Overview ===
Competition	First match	Last match	Starting round	Final position	Record							
Competition	First match	Last match	Starting round	Final position	Pld	W	D	L	GF	GA	GD	Win %
Thai League	4 September 2021	21 May 2022	Matchday 1		17	7	6	4	27	22	+5	41.18
FA Cup	27 October 2021		First Round		2	2	0	0	6	1	+5	100.00
League Cup	12 January 2022	12 January 2022	First Round	First Round	1	0	0	1	0	1	−1	0.00
Total					20	9	6	5	33	24	+9	45.00

Last updated: 16 January 2022
Source: Competitions

=== Thai League 1 ===
==== League table ====
Pos	Team	Pld	W	D	L	GF	GA	GD	Pts	Qualification
2	BG Pathum United (Q)	30	17	9	4	52	27	+25	60	Qualification for 2023–24 AFC Champions League qualifying play-offs
3	Bangkok United	30	15	8	7	53	30	+23	53	
4	Muangthong United	30	13	10	7	46	35	+11	49	
5	Chiangrai United	30	13	8	9	33	35	−2	47	
6	Nongbua Pitchaya	30	13	8	9	42	35	+7	47	

Updated to match(es) played on 4 May 2022. Source: Thai League
Rules for classification: 1) Points; 2) Head-to-head points; 3) Head-to-head goals difference; 4) Head-to-head goals scored; 5) Overall goals difference; 6) Overall goals scored; 7) Fair play points; 8) Play-off without extra time;).
(Q) Qualified for the phase indicated

==== Results summary ====
Overall								Home						Away					
Pld	W	D	L	GF	GA	GD	Pts	W	D	L	GF	GA	GD	W	D	L	GF	GA	GD
17	7	6	4	27	22	+5	27	6	3	0	21	11	+10	1	3	4	6	11	−5

==== Results by matchday ====
Matchday	1	2	3	4	5	6	7	8	9	10	11	12	13	14	15	16	17	18	19
Ground	A	H	H	A	H	H	A	A	H	A	H	A	H	A	H	A	H	A	H
Result	D	D	W	L	D	W	L	W	W	L	W	D	W	L	W	D	D	W	L
Position	7	9	11	11	11	6	7	5	6	7	5	6	5	7	6	6	6		

A = Away; H = Home; W = Win; D = Draw; L = Loss

==== Matches ====
Win Draw Loss

4 September 2021 1	PT Prachuap	2–2	Muangthong United	Buriram
	Tauã 4'; Willen 88' (pen.)		Popp 68'; Poramet 78'; Suporn (yellow card) 29'; Wattanakorn (yellow card) 41'; Chatchai (yellow card) 88'	Stadium: Buriram City Stadium; Attendance: 0 Referee: Songkran Bunmeekiart; Man of the Match: Willian Popp (Muangthong United)

12 September 2021 2	Muangthong United	3–3	Chonburi	Nonthaburi
	Popp 72'; Picha 76'; Adisak 83' (pen.); Weerathep (yellow card) 11'; Wongsakorn (yellow card) 39'		Yoo 23'; Worachit 58'; Kanyuk 69' (yellow card) 13'; Kroekrit (yellow card) 27'; Noppanon (yellow card) 39'; Eldstål (yellow card) 43'; Sampan (yellow card) 75'; Phanuphong (yellow card) 77'	Stadium: Thunderdome Stadium; Attendance: 0 Referee: Anusorn Nookaew; Man of the Match: Willian Popp (Muangthong United)

24 September 2021 3	Muangthong United	2–1	Ratchaburi Mitr Phol	Nonthaburi
	Popp 19' (pen.) 80'; Rocha (yellow card) 26'; Adisak (yellow card) 45+4'		Derley 41'; Pawee (yellow card) 18'; Narakorn (yellow card) 65'; Jirawat (yellow card) 67'	Stadium: Thunderdome Stadium; Attendance: 0 Referee: Winat Phophat; Man of the Match: Boontawee Theppawong (Muangthong United)

2 October 2021 4	Port	1–0	Muangthong United	Bangkok
	Bonilla 30'; Nitipong (yellow card) 45'; Sergio Suárez (yellow card) 57'; Roller (yellow card) 82'		Picha (yellow card) 38'; Suporn (yellow card) 57'	Stadium: PAT Stadium; Attendance: 0 Referee: Niwat Insa-ard; Man of the Match: David Rochela (Port)

5 October 2021 5	Muangthong United	1–1	Nongbua Pitchaya	Nonthaburi
	Mirzaev 14' (pen.); Wattanakorn (yellow card) 52'; Picha (yellow card) 78'		Hamilton 4' (pen.); Lursan (yellow card) 85'; Kittikun (yellow card) 86'	Stadium: Thunderdome Stadium; Attendance: 1,092; Referee: Songkran Bunmeekiart; Man of the Match: Kittikun Jamsuwan (Nongbua Pitchaya)

9 October 2021 6	Muangthong United	3–1	Khon Kaen United	Nonthaburi
	Mirzaev 55' 63'; Popp 70' (yellow card) 31'; Rocha (yellow card) 8'; Suporn (yellow card) 90+3'		Ibson 13'; Phalakon (yellow card) 57'	Stadium: Thunderdome Stadium; Attendance: 1,745; Referee: Tastarawut Khantavichai; Man of the Match: Sardor Mirzaev (Muangthong United)

13 October 2021 7	BG Pathum United	2–1	Muangthong United	Pathum Thani
	Jakkapan 26'; Teerasil 43'; Túñez (yellow card) 57'; Ingreso (yellow card) 90'		Purachet 84'	Stadium: Leo Stadium; Attendance: 0 Referee: Natee Choosuwan; Man of the Match: Teerasil Dangda (BG Pathum United)

17 October 2021 8	Leo Chiangrai United	0–1	Muangthong United	Chiang Rai
	Wasan (yellow card) 61'; Pharadon (yellow card) 90'		Popp 90+3' (yellow card) 70'; Ballini (red card) 16'; Chatchai (yellow card) 45'	Stadium: Leo Chiangrai Stadium; Attendance: 1,038; Referee: Torphong Somsing; Man of the Match: Peerapong Ruennin (Muangthong United)

23 October 2021 9	Muangthong United	2–1	Police Tero	Nonthaburi
	Mirzaev 41' (yellow card) 80'; Poramet 78' (yellow card) 78'; Curran (yellow card) 51'; Picha (yellow card) 63'; Suporn (yellow card) 87'		Adisak 3' (o.g.); Arthit (red card) 28'; Sitthichok (yellow card) 34'; Chumpol (yellow card) 45+3' (yellow-red card) 70'	Stadium: Thunderdome Stadium; Attendance: 1,845; Referee: Phairot Bunkamnoed; Man of the Match: Poramet Arjvirai (Muangthong United)

31 October 2021 10	Buriram United	2–0	Muangthong United	Buriram
	Samuel Rosa 64' (yellow card) 19'; Narubadin Weerawatnodom 81'; Piyaphon (yellow card) 45'		Wattanakorn (yellow card) 20'; Chatchai (yellow card) 87'	Stadium: Chang Arena; Attendance: 12,007; Referee: Sivakorn Pu-udom; Man of the Match: Rebin Sulaka (Buriram United)

7 November 2021 11	Muangthong United	2–1	Suphanburi	Nonthaburi
	Mirzaev 7' 54'; Popp (yellow card) 89'; Weerathep (yellow card) 90+2'; Peerapong (yellow card) 90+3'		Ratchanat 4'; Nattapon (yellow card) 23'	Stadium: Thunderdome Stadium; Attendance: 2,145; Referee: Mongkolchai Pechsri; Man of the Match: Picha Autra (Muangthong United)

10 November 2021 12	Samut Prakan City	0–0	Muangthong United	Samut Prakan
	Phatsaphon (yellow card) 29'; Sakai (yellow card) 55'			Stadium: Samut Prakarn SAT Stadium; Attendance: 963; Referee: Kotchapoom Meesridaecha; Man of the Match: Aris Zarifović (Samut Prakan City)

14 November 2021 13	Muangthong United	2–0	Chiangmai United	Nonthaburi
	Popp 63' 84'; Korrawit (yellow card) 73'; Ballini (yellow card) 77'		Boli (yellow card) 16'; Surawich (yellow card) 42'; Nont (yellow card) 53'; Tawin (red card) 78'; Sirisak (yellow card) 90+4'	Stadium: Thunderdome Stadium; Attendance: 2,148; Referee: Sahapop Sriboonlue; Man of the Match: Willian Popp (Muangthong United)

21 November 2021 14	True Bangkok United	3–1	Muangthong United	Pathum Thani
	Heberty 34' 55'; Everton 45+1'; Peerapat (red card) 12'; Pokklaw (yellow card) 68'		Teeraphol 38' (yellow card) 25'; Chatchai (yellow card) 21'; Boontawee (yellow card) 32' (yellow-red card) 90+4'; Ballini (yellow card) 45'	Stadium: Thammasat Stadium; Attendance: 2,404; Referee: Warintorn Sassadee; Man of the Match: Heberty Fernandes (Bangkok United)

27 November 2021 15	Muangthong United	4–1	Nakhon Ratchasima Mazda	Nonthaburi
	Popp 3' 90'; Korrawit 23'; Poramet 76'; Boontawee (yellow card) 52'		Chalermpong 85'; Naruphol (yellow card) 27'	Stadium: Thunderdome Stadium; Attendance: 2,414; Referee: Noppadet Mangngam; Man of the Match: Willian Popp (Muangthong United)

8 January 2022 16	Chonburi	1–1	Muangthong United	Chonburi
	Kelić 51'; Rangsan (yellow card) 37'; Saharat (yellow card) 74'; Songchai (yellow card) 90+4'		Mirzaev 41'; Suporn (yellow card) 63'; Weerathep (yellow card) 80'; Rocha (yellow card) 90+4'	Stadium: Chonburi Stadium; Attendance: 3,204; Referee: Sahapop Sriboonlue; Man of the Match: Renato Kelić (Chonburi)

16 January 2022 17	Muangthong United	2–2	BG Pathum United	Nonthaburi
	Popp 14'; Boontawee 74'; Rocha (yellow card) 17'		Diogo 47'; Ikhsan 55'; Túñez (yellow card) 21'	Stadium: Thunderdome Stadium; Attendance: 5,237; Referee: Songkran Bunmeekiart; Man of the Match: Willian Popp (Muangthong United)

26 January 2022 18 (Rescheduled)	Ratchaburi Mitr Phol	0–1	Muangthong United	Ratchaburi
	Sanrawat (yellow card) 90+2'		Henri Anier 57', (yellow card) 30'; Picha (yellow card) 18'; Wongsakorn (yellow card) 45+3'; Teeraphol (yellow card) 53'; Somporn (yellow card) 90+7'	Stadium: Mitr Phol Stadium; Attendance: 1,746; Referee: Phairot Bunkamnoed; Man of the Match: Jesper Nyholm (Muangthong United)

29 January 2022 24 (Rescheduled)	Muangthong United	0–1	Buriram United	Nonthaburi
	Boontawee (yellow card) 7'; Weerathep (yellow card) 90'		Ratthanakorn 8'; Bolingi (yellow card) 44'	Stadium: Thunderdome Stadium; Referee: Sarayut Chakngern; Man of the Match: Ratthanakorn Maikami (Buriram United)

=== Thai FA Cup ===
==== Matches ====
Win Draw Loss

27 October 2021 First Round	MH Nakhon Si (TA)	1–4	Muangthong United (T1)	Surat Thani
	Worawut 62'		Poramet 14' 86'; Teeraphol 35' 90'	Stadium: Bansong Stadium; Referee: Kotchapoom Meesridecha

24 November 2021 Second Round	Mahasarakham (T3)	0–2 (a.e.t.)	Muangthong United (T1)	Maha Sarakham
			Amphol 100' (o.g.); Sorawit 120'	Stadium: Mahasarakham Province Stadium

19 January 2022 Third Round	Muangthong United (T1)	1-2 (a.e.t.)	Uthai Thani (T3)	Nonthaburi
	Willian Popp 42'		Phattharaphon Junsuwan 85'; Ricardo Santos 102'	Stadium: Thunderdome Stadium; Attendance: 906; Referee: Noppadet Mangngam

=== Thai League Cup ===
==== Matches ====
Win Draw Loss

12 January 2022 First Round	Uthai Thani (T3)	1–0	Muangthong United (T1)	Uthai Thani
	Santos 33'			Stadium: Uthai Thani Province Stadium; Attendance: 1,850; Referee: Kotchapoom Meesridaecha

== Team statistics ==
=== Appearances and goals ===
As of 16 January 2022

No.	Pos.	Player	League 1		FA Cup		League Cup		Total	
No.	Pos.	Player	Apps.	Goals	Apps.	Goals	Apps.	Goals	Apps.	Goals
1	GK	(Thailand) Somporn Yos	5	0	2	0	1	0	8	0
2	DF	(Philippines) Jesper Nyholm	0	0	0	0	0	0	0	0
3	DF	(Brazil) Lucas Rocha	15	0	0	0	0+1	0	15+1	0
4	DF	(Thailand) Chatchai Saengdao	13+2	0	2	0	1	0	16+2	0
5	DF	(Thailand) Suporn Peenagatapho	11+3	0	2	0	1	0	14+3	0
6	MF	(Thailand) Teeraphol Yoryoei	6+7	1	2	2	1	0	9+7	3
7	MF	(Thailand) Sorawit Panthong	0+3	0	0+1	1	1	0	1+4	1
8	FW	(Thailand) Korrawit Tasa	4+9	1	0+1	0	1	0	5+10	1
9	FW	(Estonia) Henri Anier	0+1	0	0	0	0	0	0+1	0
10	MF	(Uzbekistan) Sardor Mirzaev	15+2	7	0	0	0+1	0	15+3	7
14	MF	(Thailand) Peerapong Panyanumaporn	0+2	0	2	0	0	0	2+2	0
15	MF	(Thailand) Oliver Granberg	0	0	0	0	0	0	0	0
18	MF	(Thailand) Weerathep Pomphan	15+1	0	0	0	0+1	0	15+2	0
19	FW	(Brazil) Willian Popp	17	11	0	0	0+1	0	17+1	11
20	FW	(Thailand) Poramet Arjvirai	8+9	3	1+1	2	0+1	0	9+11	5
21	MF	(Thailand) Purachet Thodsanit	2+5	1	2	0	1	0	5+5	1
22	MF	(Thailand) Phumin Kaewta	0+2	0	2	0	1	0	3+2	0
23	DF	(Thailand) Marco Ballini	6+2	0	1	0	1	0	8+2	0
24	MF	(Thailand) Wongsakorn Chaikultewin	9+3	0	0+2	0	0	0	9+5	0
30	GK	(Thailand) Peerapong Ruennin	12	0	0	0	0	0	12	0
32	MF	(Thailand) Atikun Mheetuam	0	0	0	0	1	0	1	0
33	DF	(Thailand) Wattanakorn Sawatlakhorn	12+3	0	0+2	0	0	0	12+5	0
37	MF	(Thailand) Picha Autra	15+2	1	0+1	0	0	0	15+3	1
39	DF	(Thailand) Boontawee Theppawong	11+5	1	0	0	1	0	12+5	1
45	DF	(Thailand) Chutikom Klinjumpasri	0	0	2	0	0	0	2	0
Players who have played this season and/or sign for the season but had left the club or on loan to other clubs
11	FW	(Thailand) Adisak Kraisorn	9+3	1	1	0	0	0	10+3	1
15	DF	(Thailand) Saringkan Promsupa	0+1	0	0	0	0	0	0+1	0
16	DF	(Thailand) Patcharapol Intanee	0+2	0	2	0	0	0	2+2	0
17	MF	(Australia) Jesse Curran	2+11	0	1+1	0	0	0	3+12	0
31	GK	(Thailand) Chaloempat Ploywanrattana	0	0	0+1	0	0	0	0+1	0
