= 2023–24 Muangthong United F.C. season =

Muangthong United
2023–24 season
- Chairman: (Thailand) Wilak Lohtong
- Manager: (North Macedonia) Mario Gjurovski (until 18 September 2023) (Thailand) Uthai Boonmoh (until 26 November 2023) (Serbia) Miloš Joksić (from 27 November 2023)
- Stadium: Thunderdome Stadium, Pak Kret, Nonthaburi, Thailand
- Thai League T1: 5th
- Thai FA Cup: Second round
- Thai League Cup: Runners-up
- Top goalscorer: League: (Brazil) Willian Popp (17); All: (Brazil) Willian Popp (17)

The 2023–24 season is Muangthong United Football Club's 17th existence in the new era since they took over from Nongchok Pittaya Nusorn Football Club in 2007. It is the club's 15th consecutive season in the top flight of the Thai football league system since being promoted in the 2009 season.

== Squad ==
As of 31 January 2024

Squad No.	Name	Nationality	Date of birth (age)	Previous club
Goalkeepers
16	Kanapod Kadee	(Thailand)	26 June 2002 (age 23)	Youth team
26	Kawin Thamsatchanan	(Thailand)	26 January 1990 (age 36)	(Belgium) OH Leuven
30	Peerapong Ruennin	(Thailand)	14 September 1995 (age 30)	(Thailand) Sukhothai F.C.
33	Korrakot Pipatnadda	(Thailand)	15 July 1999 (age 26)	Youth team
38	Natthawut Paengkrathok	(Thailand)	1 February 2002 (age 24)	Youth team
39	Soponwit Rakyart	(Thailand)	25 January 2001 (age 25)	Youth team
Defenders
2	Suwit Paipromrat	(Thailand)	30 September 1996 (age 29)	(Thailand) BG Pathum United F.C.
5	Jean-Claude Billong	(Cameroon)	28 December 1993 (age 32)	(Romania) CFR Cluj
13	Sathaporn Daengsee	(Thailand)	13 May 1988 (age 38)	(Thailand) Nongbua Pitchaya F.C.
15	Chayapol Supma	(Thailand)	6 February 1997 (age 29)	Youth team
17	Theerapat Laohabut	(Thailand)	23 February 1999 (age 27)	Youth team
19	Tristan Do (Vice-captain)	(Thailand)	31 January 1993 (age 33)	(Thailand) True Bangkok United F.C.
25	Natthawat Thobansong	(Thailand)	22 April 1998 (age 28)	(Thailand) Customs United F.C.
29	Songwut Kraikruan	(Thailand)	6 November 2001 (age 24)	Youth team
40	Lee Jae-sung	(South Korea)	5 July 1988 (age 37)	(South Korea) Chungnam Asan FC
41	Jirawat Janpong	(Thailand)	5 September 2000 (age 25)	Youth team
48	Donthachai Deephom	(Thailand)	9 June 2005 (age 21)	(Thailand) Assumption United F.C.
Midfielders
6	Teeraphol Yoryoei	(Thailand)	25 October 1994 (age 31)	(Thailand) Samut Prakan City F.C.
8	Kotaro Omori	(Japan)	28 April 1992 (age 34)	(Japan) Júbilo Iwata
10	Thanawat Suengchitthawon	(Thailand)	8 January 2000 (age 26)	(England) Leicester City F.C.
11	Jaroensak Wonggorn	(Thailand)	18 May 1997 (age 29)	(Thailand) BG Pathum United F.C.
21	Purachet Thodsanit	(Thailand)	9 May 2001 (age 25)	Youth team
22	Phumin Kaewta	(Thailand)	12 March 1995 (age 31)	(Thailand) Samut Prakan City F.C.
23	Kannarin Thawornsak	(Thailand)	27 May 1997 (age 29)	(Thailand) Port F.C.
24	Wongsakorn Chaikultewin	(Thailand)	16 September 1996 (age 29)	Youth team
34	Kakana Khamyok	(Thailand)	21 May 2004 (age 22)	(Thailand) Assumption United F.C.
36	Piyanut Thodsanit	(Thailand)	10 July 2002 (age 23)	Youth team
37	Picha Autra (captain)	(Thailand)	7 January 1996 (age 30)	(Thailand) Samut Prakan City F.C.
55	Thiraphat Nuntagowat	(Thailand)	5 January 2005 (age 21)	(Thailand) Assumption United F.C.
67	Nitisak Anulun	(Thailand)	11 February 2003 (age 23)	Youth team
80	Peerapong Panyanumaporn	(Thailand)	1 June 1996 (age 30)	Youth team
Strikers
7	Willian Popp (Vice-captain)	(Brazil)	13 April 1994 (age 32)	(Brazil) Associação Chapecoense de Futebol
14	Stefan Šćepović	(Serbia)	10 January 1990 (age 36)	(Australia) Brisbane Roar FC
20	Poramet Arjvirai	(Thailand)	20 July 1998 (age 27)	Youth team
Players loaned out / left club during season
4	Chatchai Saengdao	(Thailand)	11 January 1997 (age 29)	Youth team
18	Weerathep Pomphan	(Thailand)	27 July 1997 (age 28)	(Thailand) Chamchuri United F.C.
27	Jessadakorn Noysri	(Thailand)	18 July 1999 (age 26)	Youth team
28	Sarayut Yoosuebchuea	(Thailand)	11 May 2000 (age 26)	Youth team

== Transfer ==
=== In ===
Pre-season transfer

Position	Player	Transferred From	Ref
MF	(Thailand) Thanawat Suengchitthawon	(England) Leicester City F.C.	Free
FW	(Serbia) Stefan Šćepović	(Australia) Brisbane Roar FC	Undisclosed
DF	(Thailand) Suwit Paipromrat	(Thailand) BG Pathum United F.C.	Undisclosed
DF	(Thailand) Natthawat Thobansong	(Thailand) Customs United F.C.	Undisclosed
DF	(Cameroon) Jean-Claude Billong	(Romania) CFR Cluj	Undisclosed
DF	(Thailand) Tristan Do	Unattached (Note: Most recently played for True Bangkok United F.C.)	Free

Mid-season transfer

Position	Player	Transferred From	Ref
DF	(South Korea) Lee Jae-sung	(South Korea) Chungnam Asan FC	Undisclosed
DF	(Thailand) Sathaporn Daengsee	Unattached (Note: Most recently played for Nongbua Pitchaya F.C.)	Free
DF	(Thailand) Donthachai Deephom	(Thailand) Assumption United F.C.	Free
MF	(Thailand) Thiraphat Nuntagowat	(Thailand) Assumption United F.C.	Free

=== Out ===
Preseason

Position	Player	Transferred To	Ref
MF	(Uzbekistan) Sardor Mirzaev	(Uzbekistan) FC AGMK	Free
FW	(Estonia) Henri Anier	(Hong Kong) Lee Man FC	Free
DF	(Brazil) Lucas Rocha	(Brazil) Atlético Clube Goianiense	Free
DF	(Philippines) Jesper Nyholm	(Malaysia) Perak F.C.	Free
DF	(Thailand) Suporn Peenagatapho	(Thailand) Buriram United F.C.	Free
MF	(Thailand) Saharat Kanyaroj	(Thailand) PT Prachuap F.C.	Free
DF	(Thailand) Boontawee Theppawong	(Thailand) True Bangkok United F.C.	Free
MF	(Thailand) Sakunchai Saengthopho	(Thailand) Marines F.C.	Free
MF	(Thailand) Oliver Granberg	(Sweden) Täby FK	Free
DF	(Thailand) Ronan Pluijmen	(Netherlands) Roda JC Kerkrade	Free
MF	(Thailand) Nontawat Klinchampasri	(Thailand) Kasetsart F.C.	Free
MF	(Thailand) Patcharapol Intanee	(Thailand) Lamphun Warriors F.C.	Free
FW	(Kenya) Eric Johana Omondi	Unattached (Note: Later joined FC UTA Arad)	Free

Mid-season

Position	Player	Transferred To	Ref
MF	(Thailand) Weerathep Pomphan	(Thailand) True Bangkok United F.C.	THB20m

=== Loan In ===
Preseason

Position	Player	Loaned From	Ref

Mid-Season

Position	Player	Loaned From	Ref
MF	(Japan) Kotaro Omori	(Japan) Júbilo Iwata	Season loan

=== Loan Out ===
Preseason

Position	Player	Loaned To	Ref
MF	(Thailand) Ekanit Panya	(Japan) Urawa Red Diamonds	6 months loan
DF	(Thailand) Kitphom Bunsan	(Thailand) Ayutthaya United F.C.	Season loan
FW	(Thailand) Rittiporn Wanchuen	(Thailand) Trat F.C.	Season loan
MF	(Thailand) Punnawat Chote-Jirachaithon	(Thailand) Phrae United F.C.	Season loan

Mid-Season

Position	Player	Loaned To	Ref
MF	(Thailand) Ekanit Panya	(Japan) Urawa Red Diamonds	Season loan
DF	(Thailand) Chatchai Saengdao	(Thailand) PT Prachuap F.C.	Season loan
FW	(Thailand) Jessadakorn Noysri	(Thailand) Suphanburi F.C.	Season loan
FW	(Thailand) Sarayut Yoosuebchuea	(Thailand) Kasetsart F.C.	Season loan
MF	(Thailand) Sundy Wongderree	(Thailand) Kasem Bundit University F.C.	Season loan

== Friendlies ==
=== Pre-Season Friendly ===
Win Draw Loss

=== In-Season friendlies ===
Win Draw Loss

== Competitions ==
=== Overview ===
Competition	First match	Last match	Starting round	Final position	Record							
Competition	First match	Last match	Starting round	Final position	Pld	W	D	L	GF	GA	GD	Win %
Thai League	13 August 2023	26 May 2024	Matchday 1	5th	30	16	4	10	64	45	+19	53.33
FA Cup	1 November 2023	20 December 2023	First Round	Second Round	2	1	0	1	6	3	+3	50.00
League Cup	6 December 2023	16 June 2024	First Round	Runners-up	5	3	1	1	10	4	+6	60.00
Total					37	20	5	12	80	52	+28	54.05

Last updated: 16 June 2024
Source: Competitions

=== Thai League 1 ===
==== League table ====
Pos	Team	Pld	W	D	L	GF	GA	GD	Pts	Qualification
3	Port (Q)	30	16	9	5	72	37	+35	57	Qualification for AFC Champions League Two group stage
4	BG Pathum United	30	15	9	6	59	38	+21	54	
5	Muangthong United (Note: Qualified for the Champions League Two group stage due to Đông Á Thanh Hóa's withdrawal from the competition and BG Pathum United's decision not to participate.) (Q)	30	16	4	10	64	45	+19	52	Qualification for AFC Champions League Two group stage
6	Ratchaburi	30	11	6	13	39	35	+4	39	
7	Uthai Thani	30	9	8	13	39	55	−16	35 (Note: The mini-league points record; Uthai Thani 8 pts, Khonkaen United 5 pts, Lamphun Warriors 2 pts.)	

Updated to match(es) played on 26 May 2024. Source: Thai League
Rules for classification: Season in progress: 1) Points; 2) Goal difference; 3) Goals scored; End of season: 1) Points; 2) Head-to-head points; 3) Head-to-head goal difference; 4) Goals scored.
(Q) Qualified for the phase indicated

==== Results summary ====
Overall								Home						Away					
Pld	W	D	L	GF	GA	GD	Pts	W	D	L	GF	GA	GD	W	D	L	GF	GA	GD
30	16	4	10	64	45	+19	52	10	2	3	39	15	+24	6	2	7	25	30	−5

==== Matches ====
Win Draw Loss

=== Thai FA Cup ===
==== Matches ====
Win Draw Loss

1 November 2023 First Round	Phitsanulok (T3)	0-4	Muangthong United (T1)	Phitsanulok
			Theerapat 29'; Kannarin 55'; Teeraphol 66'; Jaroensak 90+3'	Stadium: Phitsanulok PAO. Stadium; Attendance: 2,854; Referee: Chaireag Ngam-som

20 December 2023 Second Round	Sukhothai (T1)	3-2 (a.e.t.)	Muangthong United (T1)	Sukhothai
	Jakkapong 36'; Bonilla 71' (pen.) 108'		Weerathep 26'; Šćepović 49'	Stadium: Thalay Luang Stadium; Attendance: 1,009; Referee: Songkran Bunmeekiart

=== Thai League Cup ===
==== Matches ====
Win Draw Loss

6 December 2023 First Round	Lampang (T2)	1-4	Muangthong United (T1)	Lampang
	Chatri 90'		Šćepović 4' 69'; Jaroensak 67'; Chatchon 83' (o.g.)	Stadium: Lampang Province Stadium; Attendance: 1,515; Referee: Chaireag Ngam-som

13 March 2024 Second Round	PT Satun (T3)	1-3	Muangthong United (T1)	Satun
	Lee 89' (o.g.)		Teeraphol 39' 45+2'; Thanawat 90+2'	Stadium: Satun PAO. Stadium; Attendance: 4,533; Referee: Chaireag Ngam-som

11 April 2024 Quarter-finals	Khon Kaen United (T1)	1-1 (a.e.t.) (4–5 p)	Muangthong United (T1)	Khon Kaen
	Tawin 109'		Teeraphol 104'	Stadium: Khon Kaen PAO. Stadium; Attendance: 3,667; Referee: Songkran Bunmeekiart
	Penalties
	Tawin (penalty scored); Karaboué (penalty scored); Ernesto (penalty missed); Cuerva (penalty scored); Suganuma (penalty scored)		(penalty scored) Popp; (penalty scored) Omori; (penalty scored) Tristan; (penalty scored) Kannarin; (penalty scored) Poramet

22 May 2024 Semi-finals	Buriram United (T1)	0-2	Muangthong United (T1)	Pathum Thani
			Kakana 53'; Jaroensak 88'	Stadium: BG Stadium; Attendance: 11,970; Referee: Torphong Somsing

16 June 2024 Final	BG Pathum United (T1)	1-0	Muangthong United (T1)	Pathum Thani
	Teerasil Dangda 90+8'			Stadium: Thammasat Stadium; Attendance: 15,755; Referee: Sivakorn Pu-udom

== Team statistics ==
=== Appearances and goals ===
As of 16 June 2024

No.	Pos.	Player	Thai League		FA Cup		League Cup		Total	
No.	Pos.	Player	Apps.	Goals	Apps.	Goals	Apps.	Goals	Apps.	Goals
2	DF	(Thailand) Suwit Paipromrat	9	0	2	0	1	0	12	0
5	DF	(Cameroon) Jean-Claude Billong	23	1	1	0	2	0	26	1
6	MF	(Thailand) Teeraphol Yoryoei	22	5	2	1	5	3	29	9
7	FW	(Brazil) Willian Popp	23	17	0	0	4	0	27	17
8	MF	(Japan) Kotaro Omori	8	1	0	0	3	0	11	1
10	MF	(Thailand) Thanawat Suengchitthawon	14	1	0	0	4	1	18	2
11	MF	(Thailand) Jaroensak Wonggorn	28	8	2	1	5	2	35	11
13	DF	(Thailand) Sathaporn Daengsee	15	0	0	0	3	0	18	0
14	FW	(Serbia) Stefan Šćepović	25	10	2	1	5	2	32	13
15	DF	(Thailand) Chayapol Supma	16	1	1	0	4	0	21	1
16	GK	(Thailand) Kanapod Kadee	0	0	0	0	0	0	0	0
17	DF	(Thailand) Theerapat Laohabut	20	0	2	1	2	0	24	1
19	DF	(Thailand) Tristan Do	26	2	1	0	4	0	31	2
20	FW	(Thailand) Poramet Arjvirai	27	11	1	0	3	0	31	11
21	MF	(Thailand) Purachet Thodsanit	11	0	2	0	3	0	16	0
22	MF	(Thailand) Phumin Kaewta	3	0	1	0	0	0	4	0
23	MF	(Thailand) Kannarin Thawornsak	26	1	2	1	5	0	33	2
24	MF	(Thailand) Wongsakorn Chaikultewin	20	0	2	0	2	0	24	0
25	DF	(Thailand) Natthawat Thobansong	2	0	0	0	0	0	2	0
26	GK	(Thailand) Kawin Thamsatchanan	13	0	0	0	3	0	16	0
29	DF	(Thailand) Songwut Kraikruan	23	0	1	0	4	0	28	0
30	GK	(Thailand) Peerapong Ruennin	1	0	0	0	0	0	1	0
33	GK	(Thailand) Korrakot Pipatnadda	12	0	1	0	2	0	15	0
34	MF	(Thailand) Kakana Khamyok	21	3	2	0	5	1	28	4
36	MF	(Thailand) Piyanut Thodsanit	7	0	2	0	1	0	10	0
37	MF	(Thailand) Picha Autra	28	1	2	0	5	0	35	1
38	GK	(Thailand) Natthawut Paengkrathok	0	0	0	0	0	0	0	0
39	GK	(Thailand) Soponwit Rakyart	5	0	1	0	0	0	6	0
40	DF	(South Korea) Lee Jae-sung	9	1	0	0	3	0	12	1
41	DF	(Thailand) Jirawat Janpong	0	0	0	0	0	0	0	0
48	DF	(Thailand) Donthachai Deephom	0	0	0	0	0	0	0	0
55	MF	(Thailand) Thiraphat Nuntagowat	1	0	0	0	0	0	1	0
67	MF	(Thailand) Nitisak Anulun	0	0	0	0	0	0	0	0
80	MF	(Thailand) Peerapong Panyanumaporn	0	0	0	0	0	0	0	0
Players who have played this season and/or sign for the season but had left the club or on loan to other clubs
4	DF	(Thailand) Chatchai Saengdao	8	0	1	0	0	0	9	0
18	MF	(Thailand) Weerathep Pomphan	14	0	2	1	1	0	17	1
27	FW	(Thailand) Jessadakorn Noysri	1	0	0	0	0	0	1	0
28	FW	(Thailand) Sarayut Yoosuebchuea	0	0	0	0	0	0	0	0
