= 2019 SCG Muangthong United F.C. season =

SCG Muangthong United
2019 season
- Chairman: Wilak Lohtong
- Manager: Pairoj Borwonwatanadilok (until 31 March 2019); Uthai Boonmoh (caretaker); Yoon Jong-hwan (8 April 2019 - 12 June 2019); Alexandre Gama
- Stadium: SCG Stadium, Pak Kret, Nonthaburi, Thailand
Home colours	Away colours	Third colours

The 2019 season is SCG Muangthong United Football Club's 13th existence in the new era since they took over from Nongchok Pittaya Nusorn Football Club in 2007. It is the third season in the Thai League and the club's 11th consecutive season in the top flight of the Thai football league system since promoted in the 2009 season.

== Squad ==
As of 24 November 2018.

Squad No.	Name	Nationality	Date of birth (age)	Previous club
Goalkeepers
1	Đặng Văn Lâm	(Vietnam) (Russia)	13 August 1993 (age 32)	(Vietnam) Hải Phòng F.C.
29	Somporn Yos	(Thailand)	23 June 1993 (age 32)	(Thailand) PT Prachuap F.C.
Defenders
2	Suphanan Bureerat	(Thailand)	10 October 1993 (age 32)	(Thailand) Pattaya United F.C.
4	Oh Ban-suk	(South Korea)	20 May 1988 (age 37)	(Saudi Arabia) Al-Wasl F.C.
22	Daisuke Sato	(Philippines) (Japan)	20 September 1994 (age 31)	(Romania) Sepsi OSK Sfântu Gheorghe
24	Patcharapol Intanee	(Thailand)	12 October 1998 (age 27)	(Thailand) Udon Thani F.C.
25	Adisorn Promrak	(Thailand)	21 October 1993 (age 32)	(Thailand) BEC Tero F.C.
27	Phituckchai Limraksa	(Thailand)	27 March 1997 (age 28)	(Thailand) Udon Thani F.C.
32	Saringkan Promsupa	(Thailand)	29 March 1997 (age 28)	(Thailand) Rayong F.C.
33	Chayapol Supma	(Thailand)	6 February 1997 (age 28)	(Thailand) Assumption United F.C.
36	Ernesto Amantegui Phumipha	(Thailand) (Spain)	16 April 1990 (age 35)	(Thailand) Port F.C.
37	Suporn Peenagatapho	(Thailand)	12 July 1995 (age 30)	(Thailand) BEC Tero F.C.
46	Marco Ballini	(Thailand) (Italy)	12 June 1998 (age 27)	(Thailand) Chainat Hornbill F.C.
59	Nukoolkit Krutyai	(Thailand)	23 September 1992 (age 33)	(Thailand) Udon Thani F.C.
Midfielders
6	Sarach Yooyen	(Thailand)	30 May 1992 (age 33)	(Thailand) Nakhon Ratchasima F.C.
13	Sundy Wongderree	(Thailand)	27 May 1998 (age 27)	(Thailand) Udon Thani F.C.
14	Sorawit Panthong	(Thailand)	20 February 1997 (age 28)	(Thailand) Sisaket F.C.
16	Sanukran Thinjom	(Thailand)	12 September 1993 (age 32)	(Thailand) Army United F.C.
17	Rittiporn Wanchuen	(Thailand)	30 August 1995 (age 30)	(Thailand) Army United F.C.
21	Weerathep Pomphan	(Thailand)	27 July 1997 (age 28)	(Thailand) Chamchuri United F.C.
23	Charyl Chappuis	(Thailand) (Switzerland)	12 January 1992 (age 34)	(Thailand) Suphanburi F.C.
26	Peerapong Panyanumaporn	(Thailand)	1 June 1996 (age 29)	(Thailand) Samut Prakan City F.C.
34	Wattana Playnum	(Thailand)	19 August 1989 (age 36)	(Thailand) Pattaya United F.C.
Strikers
7	Heberty	(Brazil)	29 August 1988 (age 37)	(Saudi Arabia) Al-Shabab FC
8	Korrawit Tasa	(Thailand)	7 April 2000 (age 25)	(Thailand) Udon Thani F.C.
9	Aung Thu	(Myanmar)	22 May 1996 (age 29)	(Thailand) Police Tero F.C.
10	Teerasil Dangda (Captain)	(Thailand)	6 June 1988 (age 37)	(Japan) Sanfrecce Hiroshima
11	Adisak Kraisorn	(Thailand)	1 February 1991 (age 34)	(Thailand) BEC Tero F.C.
19	Poramet Arjvirai	(Thailand)	20 July 1998 (age 27)	(Thailand) Bangkok F.C.
87	Derley	(Brazil)	29 December 1987 (age 38)	(Portugal) C.D. Aves
Players loaned out / left club during season
28	Prasit Padungchok	(Thailand)	13 October 1982 (age 43)	(Thailand) BEC Tero F.C.
15	Lee Ho	(South Korea)	22 October 1984 (age 41)	(South Korea) Jeonbuk Hyundai
20	Mario Gjurovski	(North Macedonia) (Serbia)	11 December 1985 (age 40)	(Thailand) Bangkok Glass F.C.
35	Weerawut Kayem	(Thailand)	23 March 1993 (age 32)	(Thailand) Udon Thani F.C.

== Transfer ==
=== Pre-season transfer ===
==== In ====
Position	Player	Transferred From	Ref
GK	(Vietnam) (Russia) Đặng Văn Lâm	(Vietnam) Hải Phòng F.C.	Free
DF	(Thailand) Suphanan Bureerat	(Thailand) Pattaya United F.C.	Season loan
DF	(South Korea) Oh Ban-suk	(Saudi Arabia) Al-Wasl F.C.	Season loan
MF	(North Macedonia) (Serbia) Mario Gjurovski	(Thailand) Bangkok Glass FC	
FW	(Myanmar) Aung Thu	(Myanmar) Yadanarbon F.C.	Season loan

==== Out ====
Position	Player	Transferred To	Ref
GK	(Thailand) Kampol Pathom-attakul	(Thailand) Chonburi F.C.	Season loan
GK	(Thailand) Taro Prasarnkarn	(Thailand) Bangkok F.C.	Season loan
DF	(Singapore) Baihakki Khaizan	(Thailand) Trat F.C.	Free
DF	(Thailand) (France) Tristan Do	(Thailand) Bangkok United	THB25m
DF	(Thailand) Peerapat Notchaiya	(Thailand) Bangkok United	THB16m
DF	(Japan) Naoaki Aoyama	(Japan) Gamba Osaka	Free
DF	(Thailand) Isariya Marom	(Thailand) Udon Thani F.C.	Season loan
DF	(Thailand) Pitakpong Kulasuwan	(Thailand) Udon Thani F.C.	Season loan
DF	(Thailand) Theerathon Bunmathan	(Japan) Yokohama F. Marinos	Season loan
MF	(Thailand) Suradet Klankhum	(Thailand) Bangkok F.C.	Season loan
MF	(Thailand) Datsakorn Thonglao	(Thailand) Simork F.C.	Season loan
MF	(Thailand) Suksan Mungpao	(Thailand) Army United F.C.	Season loan
MF	(Thailand) Anuwat Piankaew	(Thailand) Sisaket F.C.	Season loan
MF	(Thailand) Prakit Deeprom	(Thailand) Udon Thani F.C.	
MF	(Thailand) Wongsakorn Chaikultewin	(Thailand) Trat F.C.	Season loan
MF	(Thailand) Reungyos Janchaichit	(Thailand) Police Tero F.C.	Season loan
MF	(Thailand) Chanathip Songkrasin	(Japan) Hokkaido Consadole Sapporo	Euro2.4m
FW	(Thailand) Chenrop Samphaodi	(Thailand) Trat F.C.	Season loan
FW	(Brazil) Jajá		Free
FW	(Brazil) Célio Santos	(Thailand) Suphanburi F.C.	End of Contract

Note 1: Pitakpong Kulasuwan returned to the team after the loan but transferred to the same team for loan in 2019.

==== Return from loan ====
Position	Player	Transferred From	Ref
GK	(Thailand) Taro Prasarnkarn	(Thailand) Bangkok F.C.	Loan Return
GK	(Thailand) Somporn Yos	(Thailand) PT Prachuap F.C.	Loan Return
DF	(Thailand) Pitakpong Kulasuwan	(Thailand) Udon Thani F.C.	Loan Return
DF	(Singapore) Baihakki Khaizan	(Thailand) Udon Thani F.C.	Loan Return
DF	(Thailand) Theerathon Bunmathan	(Japan) Vissel Kobe	Loan Return
DF	(Thailand) Isariya Marom	(Thailand) Bangkok F.C.	Loan Return
MF	(Thailand) Suradet Klankhum	(Thailand) Bangkok F.C.	Loan Return
MF	(Thailand) Datsakorn Thonglao	(Thailand) Udon Thani F.C.	Loan Return
MF	(Thailand) Prakit Deeprom	(Thailand) Udon Thani F.C.	Loan Return
MF	(Thailand) Suksan Mungpao	(Thailand) Army United F.C.	Loan Return
MF	(Thailand) Anuwat Piankaew	(Thailand) Sisaket F.C.	Loan Return
MF	(Thailand) Wongsakorn Chaikultewin	(Thailand) Udon Thani F.C.	Loan Return
FW	(Thailand) Teerasil Dangda	(Japan) Sanfrecce Hiroshima	Loan Return

=== Mid-season transfer ===
==== In ====
Position	Player	Transferred From	Ref
DF	(Philippines) (Japan) Daisuke Sato	(Romania) Sepsi OSK Sfântu Gheorghe	Free
FW	(Brazil) Derley	(Portugal) C.D. Aves	Free
MF	(Brazil) Bruno Gallo	(Portugal) G.D. Chaves	
DF	(Thailand) (Spain) Ernesto Amantegui Phumipha	(Thailand) Port F.C.	
DF	(Thailand) (Italy) Marco Ballini	(Thailand) Chainat Hornbill F.C.	

==== Out ====
Position	Player	Transferred To	Ref
GK	(Thailand) Kampol Pathom-attakul	(Thailand) Samut Prakan City F.C.	Season loan
DF	(Thailand) Weerawut Kayem	(Thailand) PT Prachuap F.C.	Season loan
DF	(Thailand) Nukoolkit Krutyai	(Thailand) Trat F.C.	Season loan
DF	(Thailand) Pitakpong Kulasuwan	(Thailand) Police Tero F.C.	
MF	(North Macedonia) (Serbia) Mario Gjurovski		
MF	(South Korea) Lee Ho		
MF	(Thailand) Datsakorn Thonglao	(Thailand) Chonburi F.C.	
MF	(Thailand) Suksan Mungpao	(Thailand) Ayutthaya United F.C.	Season loan
FW	(Thailand) Sakunchai Saengthopho	(Thailand) PT Prachuap F.C.	
FW	(Thailand) Chenrop Samphaodi	(Thailand) Port F.C.	

==== Return from loan ====
Position	Player	Transferred From	Ref
GK	(Thailand) Kampol Pathom-attakul	(Thailand) Chonburi F.C.	Loan Return
DF	(Thailand) Pitakpong Kulasuwan	(Thailand) Police Tero F.C.	Loan Return
MF	(Thailand) Datsakorn Thonglao	(Thailand) Chonburi F.C.	Loan Return
MF	(Thailand) Suksan Mungpao	(Thailand) Army United F.C.	Loan Return
FW	(Thailand) Chenrop Samphaodi	(Thailand) Port F.C.	Loan Return

== Friendlies ==
=== Pre-Season Friendly ===
Win Draw Loss

15 December 2018 1	BG Pathum United F.C. (Thailand)	1-1	(Thailand) Muangthong United F.C.
1700 hours	Chaowat Veerachat 60'		36'

22 December 2018 2	PTT Rayong F.C. (Thailand)	0-2	(Thailand) Muangthong United F.C.

16 January 2019 3	Samut Sakhon F.C. (Thailand)	0-1	(Thailand) Muangthong United F.C.	Samut Sakhon Province Stadium

20 January 2019 4	Hà Nội F.C. (Vietnam)	3-1	(Thailand) Muangthong United F.C.	SCG Stadium

26 January 2019 5	Phnom Penh Crown FC (Cambodia)	1-4	(Thailand) Muangthong United F.C.	SCG Stadium
	Paulo Victor

== Competitions ==
=== Overview ===
Competition	First match	Last match	Starting round	Record							
Competition	First match	Last match	Starting round	Pld	W	D	L	GF	GA	GD	Win %
Thai League	24 February 2019	27 October 2019	Matchday 1	30	14	4	12	45	42	+3	46.67
FA Cup	1 May 2019	17 July 2019	First Round	3	2	0	1	7	3	+4	66.67
League Cup	15 May 2019	15 May 2019	First Round	1	0	0	1	0	1	−1	0.00
Total				34	16	4	14	52	46	+6	47.06

Last updated: 2 October 2019
Source: Competitions

=== Thai League 1 ===
Win Draw Loss

24 February 2019 1	Muangthong United F.C. (Thailand)	0-1	(Thailand) PT Prachuap F.C.	Nonthaburi Province
			Caion 28'	Stadium: SCG Stadium

2 March 2019 2	Bangkok United F.C. (Thailand)	1-0	(Thailand) Muangthong United F.C.	Pathum Thani Province
	Nelson Bonilla 63'			Stadium: Thammasat Stadium

9 March 2019 3	Muangthong United F.C. (Thailand)	2-0	(Thailand) Chiangmai F.C.	Nonthaburi Province
	Teerasil Dangda 60'; Heberty 87' (pen.)			Stadium: SCG Stadium

16 March 2019 4	Chiangrai United F.C. (Thailand)	2-3	(Thailand) Muangthong United F.C.	Chiang Rai Province
	William Henrique 19'; Lee Yong-rae 50'		Korrawit Tasa 16'; Teerasil Dangda 29'; Adisak Kraisorn 84'	Stadium: Singha Stadium

31 March 2019 5	Ratchaburi Mitr Phol F.C. (Thailand)	2-0	(Thailand) Muangthong United F.C.	Ratchaburi Province
	Yannick Boli 50'; Kang Soo-il 67'			Stadium: Mitr Phol Stadium

3 April 2019 6	Chainat Hornbill F.C. (Thailand)	3-0	(Thailand) Muangthong United F.C.	Chai Nat Province
	Chatri Rattanawong 13'; Chatchai Koompraya 17'; Soukaphone Vongchiengkham 71'			Stadium: Khao Plong Stadium

7 April 2019 7	Nakhon Ratchasima F.C. (Thailand)	3-1	(Thailand) Muangthong United F.C.	Nakhon Ratchasima Province
	Leandro Assumpção 34'; Chitchanok Xaysensourinthone 39'; Bernard Doumbia 66'		Adisak Kraisorn 88'	Stadium: 80th Birthday Stadium

20 April 2019 8	Muangthong United F.C. (Thailand)	1-2	(Thailand) Port F.C.	Nonthaburi Province
	Weerawut Kayem 83'		Bordin Phala 50'; Nitipong Selanon 58'	Stadium: SCG Stadium

27 April 2019 9	PTT Rayong F.C. (Thailand)	2-2	(Thailand) Muangthong United F.C.	Rayong Province
	Ariel Francisco Rodríguez 45, 67'		Heberty Fernandes de Andrade 66' (pen.); Mario Gjurovski 82'	Stadium: PTT Stadium

11 May 2019 10	Muangthong United F.C. (Thailand)	0-3	(Thailand) Samut Prakan City F.C.	Nonthaburi Province
			Carlão 65'; Jaroensak Wonggorn 74'; Teeraphol Yoryoei 80'	Stadium: SCG Stadium

19 May 2019 11	Suphanburi F.C. (Thailand)	0-0	(Thailand) Muangthong United F.C.	Suphan Buri Province
				Stadium: Suphan Buri Provincial Stadium

26 May 2019 12	Buriram United F.C. (Thailand)	1-0	(Thailand) Muangthong United F.C.	Buriram Province
	Sasalak Haiprakhon 78'			Stadium: Chang Arena

29 May 2019 13	Muangthong United F.C. (Thailand)	2-0	(Thailand) Sukhothai F.C.	Nonthaburi Province
	Teerasil Dangda 42'; Heberty 57'			Stadium: SCG Stadium

16 June 2019 14	Chonburi F.C. (Thailand)	2-0	(Thailand) Muangthong United F.C.	Chonburi Province
	Kritsada Kaman 27'; Phanuphong Phonsa 74'			Stadium: Chonburi Stadium

22 June 2019 15	Muangthong United F.C. (Thailand)	3-0	(Thailand) Trat F.C.	Nonthaburi Province
	Heberty 39'; Sanukran Thinjom 74'; Aung Thu 90+4'			Stadium: SCG Stadium

30 June 2019 16	PT Prachuap F.C. (Thailand)	1-2	(Thailand) Muangthong United F.C.	Prachuap Khiri Khan Province
	Amorn Thammanarm 14'		Adisak Kraisorn 24'; Derley 78'	Stadium: Prachuap Khiri Khan Province Stadium

7 July 2019 17	Muangthong United F.C. (Thailand)	3-2	(Thailand) Bangkok United F.C.	Nonthaburi Province
	Charyl Chappuis (yellow card) 30'; Suphanan Bureerat (yellow card) 41'; Bruno Gallo 42'; Teerasil Dangda 68'; Ernesto Phumipha (yellow card) 79'; Heberty Fernandes 90+1'		Pokklaw Anan 19'; Nelson Bonilla 55'	Stadium: SCG Stadium; Attendance: 12,418; Referee: Chaireag Ngamsom; Man of the Match: Michael Falkesgaard

12 July 2019 18	Chiangmai F.C. (Thailand)	1-1	(Thailand) Muangthong United F.C.	Chiang Mai
	Chotipat Poomkeaw 86'		Sanukran Thinjom 86'	Stadium: 700th Anniversary Stadium

21 July 2019 19	Muangthong United F.C. (Thailand)	1-0	(Thailand) Chiangrai United F.C.	Nonthaburi Province
	Derley 36'			Stadium: SCG Stadium

27 July 2019 20	Muangthong United F.C. (Thailand)	2-1	(Thailand) Ratchaburi Mitr Phol F.C.	Nonthaburi Province
	Heberty 2'; Aung Thu 80'		Yoo Jun-soo 86'	Stadium: SCG Stadium

31 July 2019 21	Muangthong United F.C. (Thailand)	3-0	(Thailand) Chainat Hornbill F.C.	Nonthaburi Province
	Heberty 1' 90+4'; Aung Thu 49'			Stadium: SCG Stadium

3 August 2019 22	Muangthong United F.C. (Thailand)	2-0	(Thailand) Nakhon Ratchasima F.C.	Nonthaburi Province
	Heberty 40' 87'			Stadium: SCG Stadium

11 August 2019 23	Port F.C. (Thailand)	2-0	(Thailand) Muangthong United F.C.	Bangkok
	Sumanya Purisai 59'; Josimar Rodrigues Souza Roberto 89'			Stadium: PAT Stadium

18 August 2019 24	Muangthong United F.C. (Thailand)	2-2	(Thailand) PTT Rayong F.C.	Nonthaburi Province
	Heberty 29' (pen.); Derley 36'		Dennis Murillo 50'; Ariel Francisco Rodríguez 58'	Stadium: SCG Stadium

25 August 2019 25	Muangthong United F.C. (Thailand)	4-1	(Thailand) Suphanburi F.C.	Nonthaburi Province
	Daisuke Sato 4'; Derley 35' 75'; Sarach Yooyen 87'		Cleiton Silva 55'	Stadium: SCG Stadium

15 September 2019 26	Muangthong United F.C. (Thailand)	3-1	(Thailand) Buriram United	Nonthaburi Province
	Oh Ban-suk 5'; Derley 10'; Heberty 47'		Suphanat Mueanta 90'	Stadium: SCG Stadium

21 September 2019 27	Sukhothai F.C. (Thailand)	2-3	(Thailand) Muangthong United F.C.	Sukhothai
	Iain Ramsay 7'; Jung Myung-oh 64'		Suphanat Mueanta 12'; Heberty 43'; Oh Ban-suk 52'	Stadium: Thalay Luang Stadium

2 October 2019 28	Samut Prakan City F.C. (Thailand)	2-1	(Thailand) Muangthong United F.C.	Samut Prakan
	Baworn Tapla 40'; Ibson Melo 54'		Derley 8'	Stadium: Samut Prakarn SAT Stadium (Keha Bang Phli)

20 October 2019 29	Muangthong United F.C. (Thailand)	0-2	(Thailand) Chonburi F.C.	Nonthaburi Province
			Junior Lopes 55'; Saharat Sontisawat 90'	Stadium: SCG Stadium

26 October 2019 30	Trat F.C. (Thailand)	3-4	(Thailand) Muangthong United F.C.	Trat
	Lonsana Doumbouya 44' 75' (pen.); Yuki Bamba 75'		Teerasil Dangda 18' 73'; Derley 59'; Heberty 62'	Stadium: Trat Province Stadium

==== League table ====
Pos	Team	Pld	W	D	L	GF	GA	GD	Pts	Qualification or relegation
3	Port (Q)	30	15	8	7	55	36	+19	53	Qualification for AFC Champions League preliminary round 2 (Note: Port qualified for the AFC Champions League preliminary round 2 as 2019 Thai FA Cup winners.)
4	Bangkok United	30	13	11	6	55	32	+23	50	
5	Muangthong United	30	14	4	12	45	42	+3	46	
6	Samut Prakan City	30	12	7	11	44	50	−6	43	
7	Chonburi	30	11	7	12	43	45	−2	40	

Source: Thai League
Rules for classification: 1) Points; 2) Head-to-head points; 3) Head-to-head goals difference; 4) Head-to-head goals scored; 5) Overall goals difference; 6) Overall goals scored; 7) Fair play points; 8) Play-off without extra time;).
(Q) Qualified for the phase indicated

=== Thai FA Cup ===
Win Draw Loss

1 May 2019 1st Round	(T1) PT Prachuap F.C. (Thailand)	0-3	(Thailand) Muangthong United F.C.	Prachuap Khiri Khan Province
			Teerasil Dangda 28'; Adisak Kraisorn 83'; Heberty Fernandes de Andrade 86'	Stadium: Prachuap Khiri Khan Province Stadium

19 June 2019 2nd Round	(T3) Singburi Bangrajun F.C. (Thailand)	1-4	(Thailand) Muangthong United F.C.	Sing Buri Province
	Wisarut Phetkanphum 47'		Mario Gjurovski 25'; Korrawit Tasa 29' 36'; Heberty Fernandes de Andrade 55'	Stadium: Singburi Province Stadium

17 July 2019 3rd Round	Muangthong United F.C. (Thailand)	0-2	(Thailand) Port F.C. (T1)	Nonthaburi Province
			Teerasil Dangda 73' (o.g.); Rolando Blackburn 80'	Stadium: SCG Stadium

=== Thai League Cup ===
Win Draw Loss

15 May 2019 1	(T2) Police Tero F.C. (Thailand)	1-0	(Thailand) Muangthong United F.C.	Bangkok
				Stadium: Boonyachinda Stadium
