= Siam Sport Syndicate =

Thai sports media company

Siam Sport Syndicate Public Company Limited
- Native name: บริษัท สยามสปอร์ต ซินดิเคท จำกัด (มหาชน)
- Company type: Public limited company (Unlisted)
- Industry: Mass media
- Founded: 1973
- Founder: Ravi Lohtong
- Headquarters: Bangkok, Thailand
- Key people: Wiluck Lohtong (Chairman)
- Products: Newspapers, magazines, broadcasting, digital media
- Revenue: ▼1.02 billion baht (2019)
- Net income: ▼ −267.51 million baht (2019)
- Total assets: ▼1.31 billion baht (2019)
- Website: www.siamsport.co.th

Siam Sport Syndicate Public Company Limited (Thai: บริษัท สยามสปอร์ต ซินดิเคท จำกัด (มหาชน)) is a Thai mass media company specialising in sports and entertainment content. Founded in 1973 by Ravi Lohtong, the company has been one of the major sports media organisations in Thailand, operating across print, broadcast, and digital platforms.

== History ==
The company originated as a publishing business producing sports magazines before expanding into printing and daily newspaper publishing. It was restructured as Siam Sport Syndicate Company Limited in 1990 and subsequently listed on the Stock Exchange of Thailand in 1995.

Over time, the company diversified into television production, radio broadcasting, and digital media, becoming a multi-platform sports media group in Thailand.

The company traded on the Stock Exchange of Thailand under the ticker symbol SPORT. In 2019, Siam Sport announced that its board had approved calling a shareholders' meeting to consider delisting the company's securities from the exchange. In February 2020, Siam Sport Syndicate voluntarily delisted from the exchange, ending its 25-year status as a listed company.

Following the delisting, and amid industry-wide shifts towards online media, the company ceased the print publication of its flagship newspaper, Siam Sport Daily, in August 2023, fully transitioning its focus to digital platforms.

== Operations ==
Siam Sport operates across multiple sectors of the media industry, including:

- Digital media and online platforms
- Broadcasting rights and sports television
- Print media (magazines and formerly newspapers)

The company has historically been a key player in sports broadcasting rights within Thailand. Most notably, it previously held the domestic broadcasting rights for major international football competitions, including the English Premier League.

== Football involvement ==
Siam Sport has been heavily associated with Thai professional football. Founder Ravi Lohtong and other executives linked to the company have historically maintained close ties and management involvement with Muangthong United. In 2007, Siam Sport founder Ravi Lohtong took ownership of the club, then known as Muangthong Nongjok United and competing in the country's third tier. Under the management of Siam Sport executives, the club achieved three consecutive championships, rapidly ascending from Division 2 to win the Thai Premier League title in 2009.

During its association with Siam Sport's leadership, Muangthong United developed into one of the most successful clubs in Thailand. The club won multiple top-flight league titles, including an undefeated league campaign in 2012, and advanced to the knockout stages of the AFC Champions League in 2017.

== Legal and regulatory matters ==
In September 2017, the Securities and Exchange Commission of Thailand imposed a civil sanction on Ravi Lohtong, Siam Sport's founder and then director and executive, for using inside information to buy SPORT shares before the company disclosed its third-quarter 2015 financial statements. Ravi agreed to pay a civil penalty of 500,000 baht and was banned from serving as a director or executive of any issuing or listed company for one year.

Siam Sport was also involved in a long-running legal dispute with the Football Association of Thailand (FAT) over commercial and broadcasting rights. The dispute arose after the FAT, under president Somyot Poompanmoung, terminated a rights-management agreement that had appointed Siam Sport to manage the association's commercial rights from 2013 to 2022. In 2021, the Specialized Appeal Court ordered the FAT to pay Siam Sport 450 million baht in damages. In March 2025, the Supreme Court amended the award to 360 million baht plus interest. Following negotiations, reports in 2026 stated that the FAT, then led by Nualphan Lamsam, would assume responsibility for 240 million baht owed by Siam Sport to TrueVisions, reducing the amount payable directly to Siam Sport to 120 million baht; the FAT reported that the final 15 million-baht instalment was due in March 2026.

== Publications ==
Siam Sport has produced several highly influential sports publications in Thailand, including:

- Siam Sport Daily (ceased print in 2023)
- Star Soccer
- Sport Pool
- Siam Dara

== See also ==
- Mass media in Thailand
- List of newspapers in Thailand
