= Peerapong Ruennin =

Thai footballer

Personal information
- Full name: Peerapong Ruennin
- Date of birth: 14 September 1995 (age 31)
- Place of birth: Bangkok, Thailand
- Height: 1.86 m (6 ft 1 in)
- Position: Goalkeeper

Team information
- Current team: Trat
- Number: 30

Youth career
- 2010–2011: Buriram United
- 2012–2013: Debsirin School

Senior career*
Years	Team	Apps	(Gls)
2014–2016	Bangkok	10	(0)
2014	→ Rangsit University (loan)	19	(0)
2017–2018	Nakhon Ratchasima	3	(0)
2018	Ubon UMT United	4	(0)
2019	PTT Rayong	26	(0)
2020–2021	Sukhothai	20	(0)
2021–2025	Muangthong United	24	(0)
2022–2023	→ Nongbua Pitchaya (loan)	4	(0)
2025–	Trat	18	(0)

International career
2014	Thailand U19	1	(0)
- * Club domestic league appearances and goals as of 12:57, 16 March 2026 (UTC)

Peerapong Ruennin (Thai: พีระพงษ์ เรือนนินทร์, born 14 September 1995) is a professional Thai footballer who plays as a goalkeeper for Thai League 2 club Trat.
