= Soponwit Rakyart =

Thai footballer (born 2001)

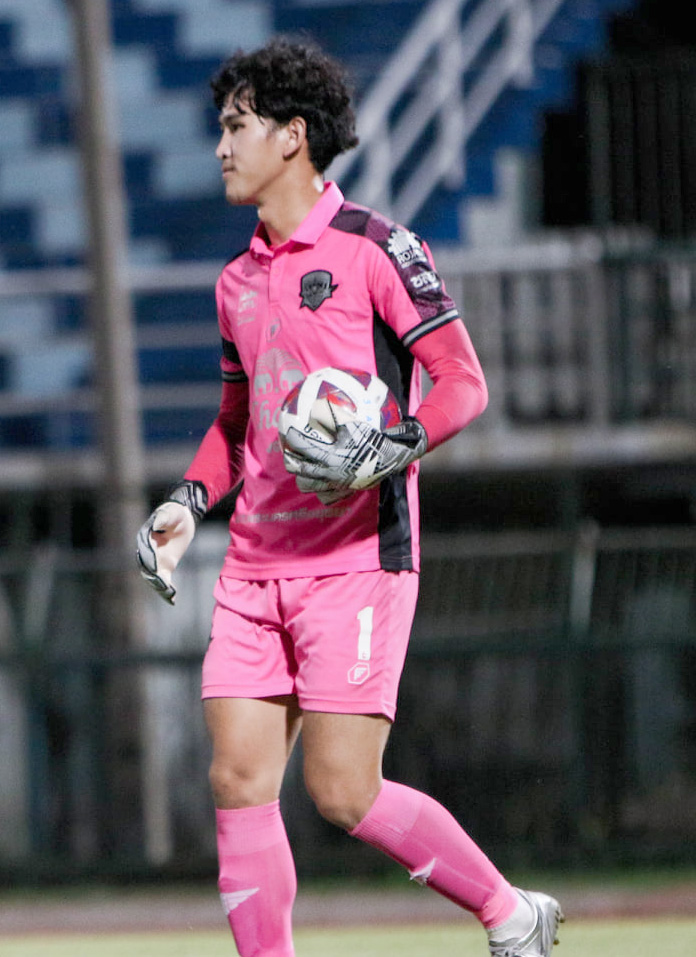

Personal information
- Full name: Soponwit Rakyart
- Date of birth: 25 January 2001 (age 25)
- Place of birth: Nakhon Si Thammarat, Thailand
- Height: 1.81 m (5 ft 11 in)
- Position: Goalkeeper

Team information
- Current team: PT Prachuap
- Number: 18

Youth career
- 2014–2019: Muangthong United

Senior career*
Years	Team	Apps	(Gls)
2020–2025	Muangthong United	7	(0)
2021–2022	→ Ayutthaya United (loan)	29	(0)
2022–2023	→ Phrae United (loan)	20	(0)
2025–	PT Prachuap	3	(0)

International career^{‡}
2021–2022	Thailand U19	4	(0)
2023–2024	Thailand U23	10	(0)
- * Club domestic league appearances and goals as of 04:27, 24 November 2025 (UTC) ‡ National team caps and goals as of 19 April 2024 (UTC)

Soponwit Rakyart (Thai: โสภณวิชญ์ รักญาติ, born 25 January 2001) is a Thai professional footballer who plays as a goalkeeper for Thai League 1 club PT Prachuap.

== International career ==
In 2024, he was called up by Thailand U23 for 2024 AFC U-23 Asian Cup in Qatar.

== Honours ==
Thailand U23

- SEA Games Silver medal: 2023
