= Marco Ballini =

Thai footballer (born 1998)

Personal information
- Full name: Marco Ballini
- Date of birth: 12 June 1998 (age 28)
- Place of birth: Bologna, Italy
- Height: 2.00 m (6 ft 6 1/2 in)
- Position: Centre back

Team information
- Current team: Chiangrai United (on loan from BG Pathum United)
- Number: 5

Youth career
- 2009–2017: Cesena

Senior career*
Years	Team	Apps	(Gls)
2017–2018	Alfonsine FC 1921	5	(0)
2018–2019	Chainat Hornbill	20	(1)
2019–2022	Muangthong United	15	(0)
2022–2024	Chiangrai United	23	(1)
2024–	BG Pathum United	15	(0)
2025–	→ Chiangrai United (loan)	20	(1)

International career^{‡}
2018	Thailand U21	4	(0)
2018–2019	Thailand U23	8	(0)
2025	Thailand	1	(0)
- * Club domestic league appearances and goals as of 9 January 2026 ‡ National team caps and goals as of 4 June 2025

Marco Ballini (Thai: มาร์โค บัลลินี, born 12 June 1998) is a professional footballer who plays as a centre back for Thai League 1 club Chiangrai United, on loan from BG Pathum United. Born in Italy, he plays for the Thailand national team.

== International career ==
Ballini made his debut for the senior Thailand national team on 4 June 2025 in a game against India.

== Personal life ==
Ballini was born in Bologna to an Italian father and a Thai mother from Udon Thani.

== Honours ==
Thailand U-23

- AFF U-22 Youth Championship runner-up: 2019
