= Phituckchai Limraksa =

Thai footballer (born 1997)

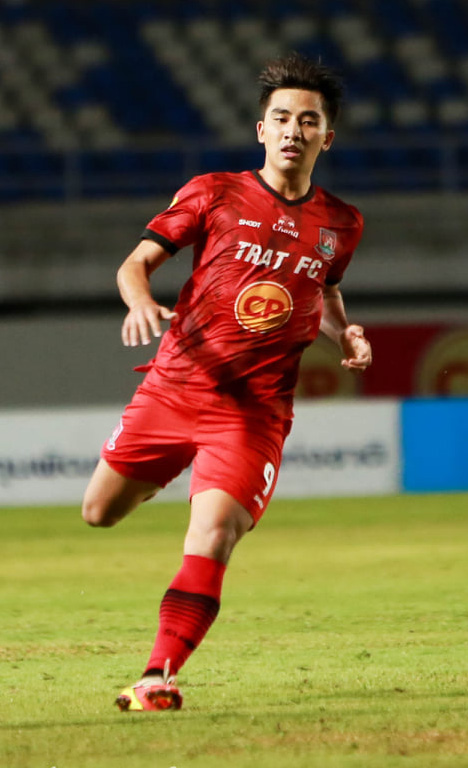

Personal information
- Full name: Phituckchai Limraksa
- Date of birth: 27 March 1997 (age 29)
- Place of birth: Bangkok, Thailand
- Height: 1.71 m (5 ft 7 1/2 in)
- Position: Left back

Team information
- Current team: Kasem Bundit University
- Number: 97

Youth career
- 2012–2017: Assumption College Thonburi

Senior career*
Years	Team	Apps	(Gls)
2018–2022	Muangthong United	2	(0)
2018	→ Udon Thani (loan)	10	(0)
2019	→ Trat (loan)	5	(0)
2020	→ Udon Thani (loan)	7	(0)
2021–2022	→ Trat (loan)	24	(0)
2022	Kasetsart	5	(0)
2023–2024	Mahasarakham	36	(2)
2024–2025	Trat	24	(0)
2025	Police Tero	5	(0)
2026–	Kasem Bundit University	7	(1)
- * Club domestic league appearances and goals as of 3 January 2026

Phituckchai Limraksa (Thai: พิทักษ์ชัย ลิ้มรักษา; born 27 March 1997) is a Thai professional footballer who plays as a left back.

== Honours ==
=== Club ===
Mahasarakham SBT

- Thai League 3 Northeastern Region: 2022–23
