= Korrakot Pipatnadda =

Thai footballer (born 1999)

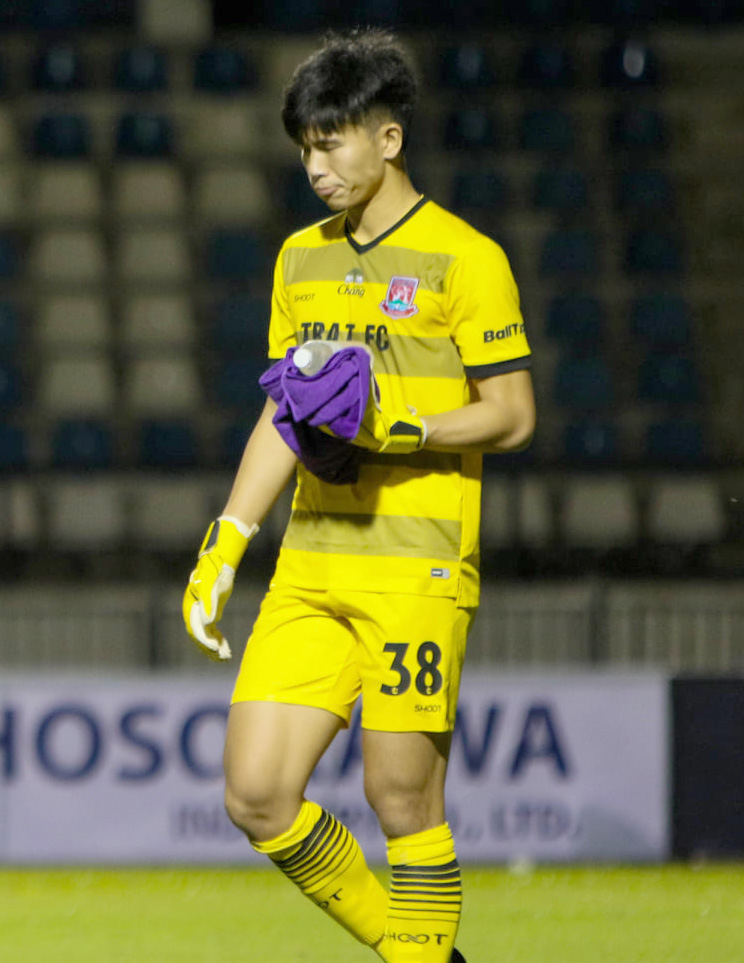
- Pipatnadda playing for Trat in 2021

Personal information
- Full name: Korrakot Pipatnadda
- Date of birth: 15 July 1999 (age 27)
- Place of birth: Bangkok, Thailand
- Height: 1.93 m (6 ft 4 in)
- Position: Goalkeeper

Team information
- Current team: Muangthong United
- Number: 1

Youth career
- 2014–2020: Muangthong United

Senior career*
Years	Team	Apps	(Gls)
2020–	Muangthong United	30	(0)
2021–2022	→ Trat (loan)	2	(0)
2021–2022	→ Kasetsart (loan)	6	(0)
2022–2023	→ Udon Thani (loan)	13	(0)
2024–2025	→ Rayong (loan)	20	(0)

International career^{‡}
2024–	Thailand	2	(0)
Medal record
Thailand
ASEAN Championship
Runner-up	ASEAN 2024	Team
Runner-up	ASEAN 2026	Team
- * Club domestic league appearances and goals as of 02:38, 19 May 2026 (UTC) ‡ National team caps and goals as of 8 December 2024

Korrakot Pipatnadda (Thai: กรกฏ พิพัฒน์นัดดา; born 15 July 1999) is a Thai professional footballer who plays as a goalkeeper for Thai League 1 club Muangthong United.

== International career ==
Korrakot was part of Thailand national team squad that won the 2024 King's Cup.

On 17 November 2024, he made his debut for the national team in a 1–1 draw to Laos. Korrakot was later selected to be a part of Thailand squad for the 2024 ASEAN Championship.

== Honours ==
=== International ===
Thailand

- King's Cup: 2024
