= Chatchai Saengdao =

Thai footballer (born 1997)

Personal information
- Full name: Chatchai Saengdao
- Date of birth: 11 January 1997 (age 29)
- Place of birth: Bangkok, Thailand
- Height: 1.83 m (6 ft 0 in)
- Position: Centre back

Team information
- Current team: Chanthaburi

Youth career
- 2013–2015: Assumption College Thonburi

Senior career*
Years	Team	Apps	(Gls)
2016–2026	Muangthong United	54	(0)
2016	→ Pattaya United (loan)	4	(0)
2017	→ Bangkok (loan)	10	(0)
2018	→ Udon Thani (loan)	6	(0)
2024	→ PT Prachuap (loan)	7	(1)
2025–2026	→ Trat (loan)	10	(0)
2026–	Chanthaburi	0	(0)

International career
2017–2018	Thailand U21	7	(0)
2018–2020	Thailand U23	12	(0)
- * Club domestic league appearances and goals

Chatchai Saengdao (Thai: ชาติชาย แสงดาว, born 11 January 1997) is a Thai professional footballer who plays as a centre back.

== Honours ==
=== International ===
Thailand U-23

- 2019 AFF U-22 Youth Championship: Runner up
