= Weerathep Pomphan =

Thai footballer

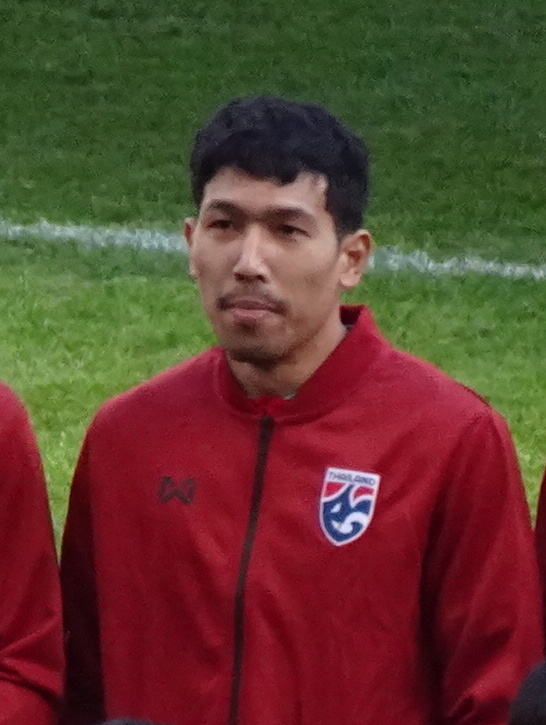
- Weerathep Pomphan in 2024

Personal information
- Full name: Weerathep Pomphan
- Date of birth: 19 September 1996 (age 30)
- Place of birth: Bangkok, Thailand
- Height: 1.82 m (6 ft 0 in)
- Position: Defensive midfielder

Team information
- Current team: Bangkok United
- Number: 27

Youth career
- 2009–2012: Sribunyanon School
- 2012–2015: Patumkongka School
- 2015–2016: Chulalongkorn University

Senior career*
Years	Team	Apps	(Gls)
2016–2019	Chamchuri United	64	(3)
2019–2024	Muangthong United	100	(1)
2024–	Bangkok United	68	(3)

International career^{‡}
2022	Thailand U23 (wildcard)	5	(1)
2021–	Thailand	50	(0)
Medal record
Thailand U23
Southeast Asian Games
Silver medal – second place	Vietnam 2021	Team
Thailand
Asean Football Championship
Winner	Suzuki Cup 2020	2020
Winner	Mitsubishi Electric Cup 2022	2022
Runner-up	Mitsubishi Electric Cup 2024	2024
- * Club domestic league appearances and goals as of 05:30, 19 October 2026 (UTC) ‡ National team caps and goals as of 9 June 2026

Weerathep Pomphan (Thai: วีระเทพ ป้อมพันธุ์, RTGS: Wirathep Pomphan, pronounced [wīː.rā.tʰêːp pɔ̂m.pʰān]; born 19 September 1996) is a Thai professional footballer who plays as a defensive midfielder for Thai League 1 club Bangkok United and the Thailand national team.

== International career ==
On 12 April 2021, Weerathep was named in Thailand's 47-man preliminary squad for the 2022 World Cup qualification phase. He was also called up to play for Thailand at the 2020 AFF Championship.

In 2024, He was named in Thailand's squad for the 2024 Toyo Tires Cup against Japan and 2023 AFC Asian Cup in Qatar.

== Personal life ==
He has a degree in health and physical education from Chulalongkorn University.

He is also known as 'Ajahn Ter' (Professor Ter). Ter is Weerathep's Thai customary nickname, and the honorific 'Ajahn' came from the fact that he has a teaching degree and his classy style of play.

== Career statistics ==
=== International ===
As of 9 June 2026

National team	Year	Apps	Goals
Thailand	2021	3	0
Thailand	2022	9	0
Thailand	2023	12	0
Thailand	2024	18	0
Thailand	2025	6	0
Thailand	2026	2	0
Thailand	Total	50	0

== Honours ==
=== Club ===
Chamchuri United

- Regional League Bangkok Area Division (1): 2016

Bangkok United

- Thai FA Cup: 2023–24

=== International ===
Thailand

- AFF Championship (2): 2020, 2022
- King's Cup: 2024, 2026

Thailand U-23

- Southeast Asian Games (silver) Silver medal: 2021
