= Jaroensak Wonggorn =

Thai footballer (born 1997)

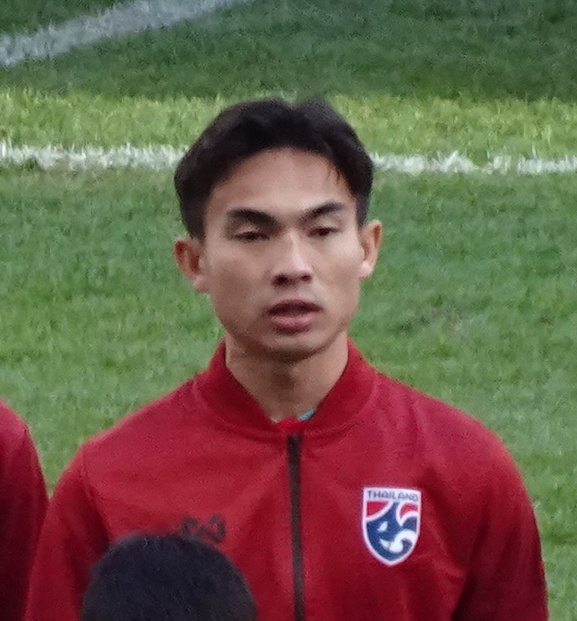
- Jaroensak with Thailand in 2024

Personal information
- Full name: Jaroensak Wonggorn
- Date of birth: 18 May 1997 (age 29)
- Place of birth: Kanchanaburi, Thailand
- Height: 1.67 m (5 ft 6 in)
- Position: Winger

Team information
- Current team: Muangthong United
- Number: 11

Youth career
- 2014–2015: Nakhon Pathom Municipality Sport School

Senior career*
Years	Team	Apps	(Gls)
2016–2017	Air Force Central	19	(3)
2018	Pattaya United	17	(1)
2019–2022	Samut Prakan City	66	(7)
2022	BG Pathum United	12	(2)
2022–2024	Muangthong United	43	(10)
2024–2026	BG Pathum United	21	(2)
2025	→ Cerezo Osaka (loan)	0	(0)
2025–2026	→ Ratchaburi (loan)	8	(1)
2026–	Muangthong United	0	(0)

International career^{‡}
2016	Thailand U19	6	(0)
2018	Thailand U21	4	(0)
2017–2020	Thailand U23	19	(9)
2021–	Thailand	21	(1)
Medal record
Thailand
Asean Football Championship
Winner	AFF Mitsubishi Electric Cup 2022	2022
- * Club domestic league appearances and goals as of 09:27, 18 May 2026 (UTC) ‡ National team caps and goals as of 7 September 2025

Jaroensak Wonggorn (Thai: เจริญศักดิ์ วงษ์กรณ์; born 18 May 1997) is a Thai professional footballer who plays as a winger for Thai League 2 club Muangthong United and the Thailand national team.

== Career ==
On 20 May 2022, Jaroensak was announced at BG Pathum United. During his time with the club, he won the 2022 Thailand Champions Cup. He had played 17 matches, scoring two goals for BG Pathum United in his first spell.

On 30 November 2022, Jaroensak was announced at Muangthong United. His impressive football performance at Muangthong United demonstrated his skills very well, as he scored 10 goals in the 2022 to 2024 season.

On 29 June 2024, Jaroensak was announced at BG Pathum United.

On 6 January 2025, Jaroensak was announced at Cerezo Osaka on a six month loan deal.

== International career ==
On 30 December 2019, Jaroensak was called up to the Thailand U23s for the 2020 AFC U-23 Championship. He ended the tournament with the Golden boot, scoring 3 goals.

On 12 April 2021, He was named in manager Akira Nishino’s 47-man squad for Thailand’s 2022 World Cup qualification.

In 2022, he was called up for the 2022 AFF Championship by Head Coach Alexandré Pölking.

O 3 January 2024, Jaroensak was called up to the Thailand squad for the 2023 AFC Asian Cup.

Jaroensak scored his first international goal in the 2026 FIFA World Cup qualification match against Singapore on 11 June 2024, scoring in the 86th minute.

=== International goals ===
Scores and results list Thailand's goal tally first.

No	Date	Venue	Opponent	Score	Result	Competition
1.	11 June 2024	Rajamangala National Stadium, Bangkok, Thailand	Singapore	3–1	3–1	2026 FIFA World Cup qualification

== Honours ==
BG Pathum United

- Thailand Champions Cup: 2022

Thailand U-23

- 2019 AFF U-22 Youth Championship: Runner up

Thailand

- AFF Championship: 2022
- King's Cup: 2024

Individual

- 2020 AFC U-23 Championship: Top scorer
- Thai League 1 Player of the Month: December 2020
- Thai League 1 Top Assists: 2020–21
- Thai League 1 Best XI: 2020–21
- Thai League 1 Rookie of the Year: 2020–21
