= Uthai Boonmoh =

Thai football manager

Personal information
- Full name: Uthai Boonmoh
- Date of birth: 1 January 1970 (age 56)
- Place of birth: Surin, Thailand

Managerial career
- Years: Team
- 2009–2013: Muangthong United (youth)
- 2015: Nonthaburi
- 2016: Phrae United
- 2017: Police Tero
- 2017: Bangkok
- 2018: Udon Thani
- 2019: Muangthong United (caretaker)
- 2023: Muangthong United (caretaker)
- 2025: Muangthong United (caretaker)

Uthai Boonmoh (Thai: อุทัย บุญเหมาะ) is a Thai professional football manager.
