= Picha Autra =

Thai professional footballer

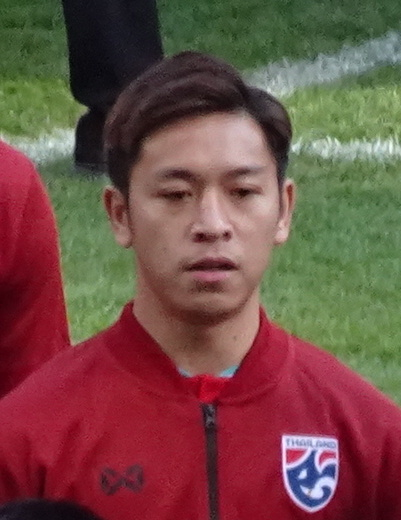
- Picha with Thailand in 2024

Personal information
- Full name: Picha Autra
- Date of birth: 7 January 1996 (age 30)
- Place of birth: Chiang Mai, Thailand
- Height: 1.69 m (5 ft 7 in)
- Positions: Midfielder; winger

Team information
- Current team: Bangkok United
- Number: 37

Youth career
- 2007–2011: JMG Academy
- 2012–2013: Muangthong United

Senior career*
Years	Team	Apps	(Gls)
2014–2015	Muangthong United	0	(0)
2014	→ Nakhon Nayok (loan)	19	(2)
2015–2018	Pattaya United	75	(11)
2019–2020	Samut Prakan City	31	(6)
2020–2025	Muangthong United	132	(3)
2025–2026	Selangor	7	(1)
2026	→ Bangkok United (loan)	7	(0)
2026–	Bangkok United	4	(0)

International career
2017	Thailand U21	1	(0)
2017–2018	Thailand U23	15	(3)
2019–	Thailand	14	(0)
Medal record
Thailand under-23
Sea Games
Gold medal – first place	Sea Games 2017	Football
Thailand
Asean Football Championship
Winner	Suzuki Cup 2020	2020
Runner-up	Hyundai Cup 2026	2026
- * Club domestic league appearances and goals as of 05:29, 19 October 2026 (UTC)

Picha Autra (Thai: พิชา อุทรา, RTGS: Phicha U-thra, pronounced [pʰi.tɕʰaː.u.tʰraː], born 7 January 1996) is a Thai professional footballer who plays as a midfielder or a winger for Thai League 1 club Bangkok United and the Thailand national team.

== Club career ==
=== Selangor ===
After 159 appearances with Muangthong United in five years, Picha moved to Malaysia Super League club Selangor on 1 July 2025.

== International career ==
=== Youth ===
Picha won the Football at the 2017 Southeast Asian Games with Thailand U23.

=== Senior ===
Picha made his debut for the Thailand senior team on 25 March 2019 in Thailand's 4–0 defeat to Uruguay in the 2019 China Cup coming on as a substitution.

In 2021, he was called up by Thailand for the 2020 AFF Championship. Picha returned to the national team in October 2023 for Thailand European tour against Georgia and Estonia.

Picha was part of 2023 AFC Asian Cup squad where he make his only appearance in the round of 16 tie against Uzbekistan.

== Honours ==
Thailand

- AFF Championship: 2020

Thailand U-23

- Sea Games Gold Medal: 2017
