= Sakunchai Saengthopho =

Thai footballer (born 1999)

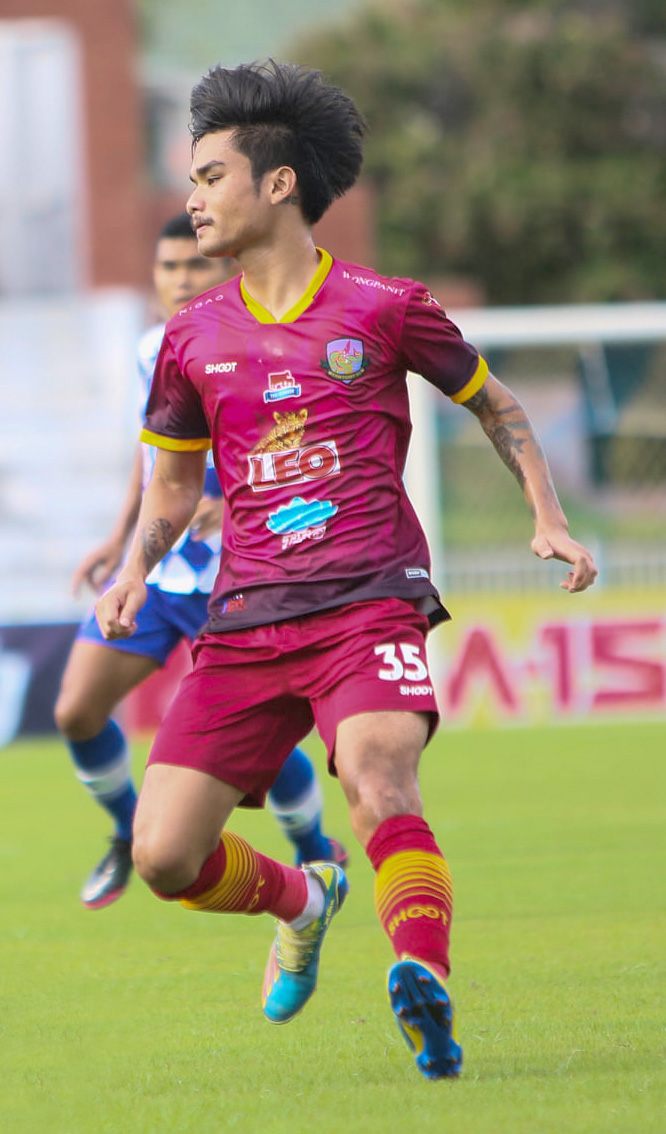
- Kasetsart FC, 2021

Personal information
- Full name: Sakunchai Saengthopho
- Date of birth: 7 June 1999 (age 27)
- Place of birth: Khon Kaen, Thailand
- Height: 1.70 m (5 ft 7 in)
- Position: Winger

Team information
- Current team: Trat
- Number: 19

Youth career
- 2015–2018: Muangthong United

Senior career*
Years	Team	Apps	(Gls)
2018–	Muangthong United	1	(0)
2019	→ PT Prachuap (loan)	6	(0)
2021	→ Suphanburi (loan)	13	(1)
2021–2022	→ Kasetsart (loan)	24	(1)
2023	→ Samut Prakan City (loan)	12	(0)
2023	Marines	8	(0)
2023–2024	Mahasarakham SBT	18	(0)
2024	Kasetsart	2	(0)
2025–	Trat	13	(0)

International career
2016–2018	Thailand U19	13	(2)
2018–2021	Thailand U23	11	(0)
- * Club domestic league appearances and goals as of 26 April 2025

Sakunchai Saengthopho (Thai: สกุลชัย แสงโทโพธิ์; born 7 June 1999) is a Thai professional footballer who plays as a winger for Thai League 2 club Trat

== Honours ==
=== Club ===
PT Prachuap

- Thai League Cup (1): 2019

=== International ===
Thailand U-23

- 2019 AFF U-22 Youth Championship: Runner up
