= Korawich Tasa =

Thai footballer

Personal information
- Full name: Korawich Tasa
- Date of birth: 7 April 2000 (age 26)
- Place of birth: Khon Kaen, Thailand
- Height: 1.80 m (5 ft 11 in)
- Positions: Forward; winger

Team information
- Current team: Chonburi

Youth career
- 2013–2018: Muangthong United

Senior career*
Years	Team	Apps	(Gls)
2018–2022	Muangthong United	54	(3)
2018	→ Bangkok (loan)	8	(1)
2018	→ Ubon UMT United (loan)	8	(4)
2022–2023	BG Pathum United	8	(1)
2023–2024	Ratchaburi	21	(4)
2024–2026	Muangthong United	46	(3)
2026–	Chonburi	0	(0)

International career^{‡}
2015–2016	Thailand U16	10	(8)
2017–2018	Thailand U19	13	(8)
2018–2021	Thailand U21	3	(0)
2019–2022	Thailand U23	16	(3)
2024–	Thailand	2	(0)
Medal record
Thailand under-16
AFF U-16 Youth Championship
Winner	AFF U-16 Youth Championship 2015	Football
Thailand under-23
Southeast Asian Games
Silver medal – second place	Sea Games 2021	Football
- * Club domestic league appearances and goals as of 01:51, 8 June 2026 (UTC) ‡ National team caps and goals as of 4 June 2025

Korawich Tasa (Thai: กรวิชญ์ ทะสา, born 7 April 2000) is a Thai professional footballer who plays as a forward or a winger for Thai League 1 club Chonburi and the Thailand national team.

== International career ==
In July 2015, he won the 2015 AFF U-16 Youth Championship with Thailand U16.

Tasa made his debut for the Thailand national team on 10 September 2024 in a 2024 LPBank Cup game against Vietnam at the Mỹ Đình National Stadium.

== Honours ==
=== Club ===
BG Pathum United

- Thai League Cup runners-up: 2022–23

=== International ===
Thailand U-16

- AFF U-16 Youth Championship winners: 2015

Thailand U-23

- AFF U-22 Youth Championship runners up: 2019
- Southeast Asian Games (silver) Silver medal: 2021
