= Tawin Butsombat =

Thai footballer (born 1987)

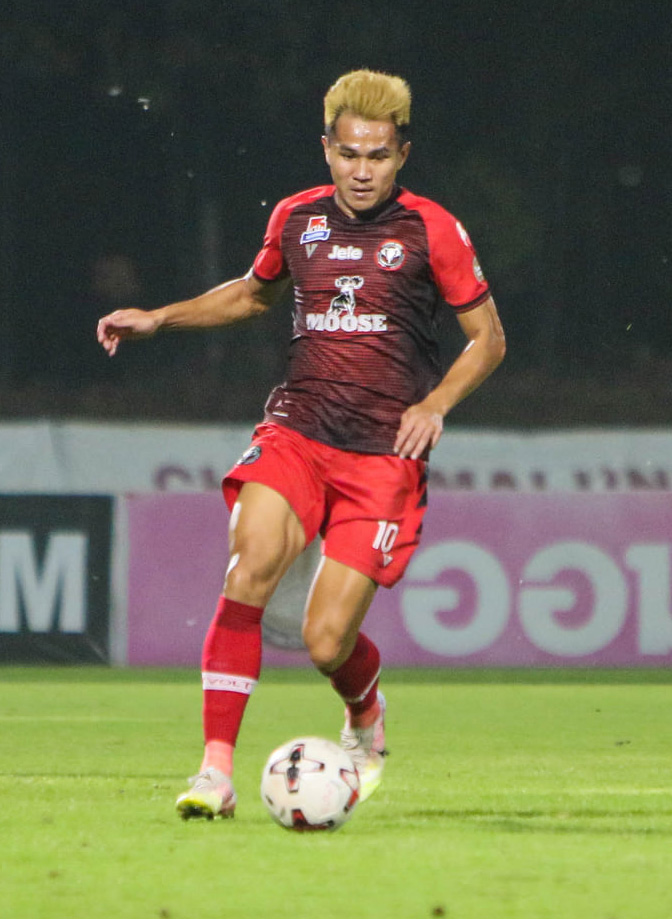

Personal information
- Full name: Tawin Butsombat
- Date of birth: 22 June 1987 (age 39)
- Place of birth: Chaiyaphum, Thailand
- Height: 1.78 m (5 ft 10 in)
- Position: Right winger

Team information
- Current team: Khon Kaen United
- Number: 7

Senior career*
Years	Team	Apps	(Gls)
2010–2011	Osotspa	39	(10)
2012	F.C. Phuket	19	(12)
2013	Bangkok	20	(5)
2014–2019	Thai Honda	122	(29)
2020–2022	Chiangmai United	56	(10)
2022–	Khon Kaen United	53	(9)
- * Club domestic league appearances and goals as of 8 October2024

Tawin Butsombat (Thai: ถวิล บุตรสมบัติ; born July 22, 1987) is a Thai professional footballer who plays for Khon Kaen United in Thai League 1 as a winger.
