= Rittiporn Wanchuen =

Thai footballer (born 1995)

Personal information
- Full name: Rittiporn Wanchuen
- Date of birth: 30 August 1995 (age 31)
- Place of birth: Songkhla, Thailand
- Height: 1.82 m (5 ft 11 1/2 in)
- Positions: Forward; winger

Team information
- Current team: Chanthaburi
- Number: 69

Youth career
- 2009–2015: Suankularb Wittayalai School

Senior career*
Years	Team	Apps	(Gls)
2016	Chamchuri United	16	(2)
2017	Police Tero	5	(0)
2017–2024	Muangthong United	1	(0)
2018	→ Army United (loan)	19	(3)
2020	→ Udon Thani (loan)	9	(2)
2020–2022	→ Suphanburi (loan)	21	(2)
2022–2023	→ Nakhon Ratchasima (loan)	22	(0)
2023–2024	→ Trat (loan)	19	(1)
2024–	Chanthaburi	18	(2)

International career
2012	Thailand U19	1	(0)
- * Club domestic league appearances and goals as of 8 February 2025

Rittiporn Wanchuen (Thai: ฤทธิพร หวานชื่น, born 30 August 1995), is a Thai professional footballer who plays as a forward or a winger.
