= Willian Popp =

Brazilian footballer (born 1994)

Personal information
- Full name: Willian Popp
- Date of birth: 13 April 1994 (age 32)
- Place of birth: Joinville, Brazil
- Height: 1.79 m (5 ft 10 in)
- Positions: Winger; forward

Team information
- Current team: Bangkok United
- Number: 19

Youth career
- Joinville

Senior career*
Years	Team	Apps	(Gls)
2014–2016	Joinville	52	(2)
2014	→ Mogi Mirim (loan)	7	(1)
2016	Busan IPark	38	(18)
2017	Avispa Fukuoka	19	(0)
2018	Bucheon 1995	30	(10)
2019	Figueirense	30	(8)
2019	Ceará	1	(0)
2020–2022	Muangthong United	50	(27)
2022	Chapecoense	13	(3)
2023–2026	Muangthong United	48	(34)
2024	→ Shanghai Port (loan)	0	(0)
2026–	Bangkok United	3	(1)
- * Club domestic league appearances and goals as of 02:07, 8 October 2026 (UTC)

Willian Popp (born 13 April 1994) is a Brazilian footballer who plays as a winger or a forward.

== Career ==
He joined K League 2 side Busan IPark in March 2016.
