= Teeraphol Yoryoei =

Thai footballer (born 1994)

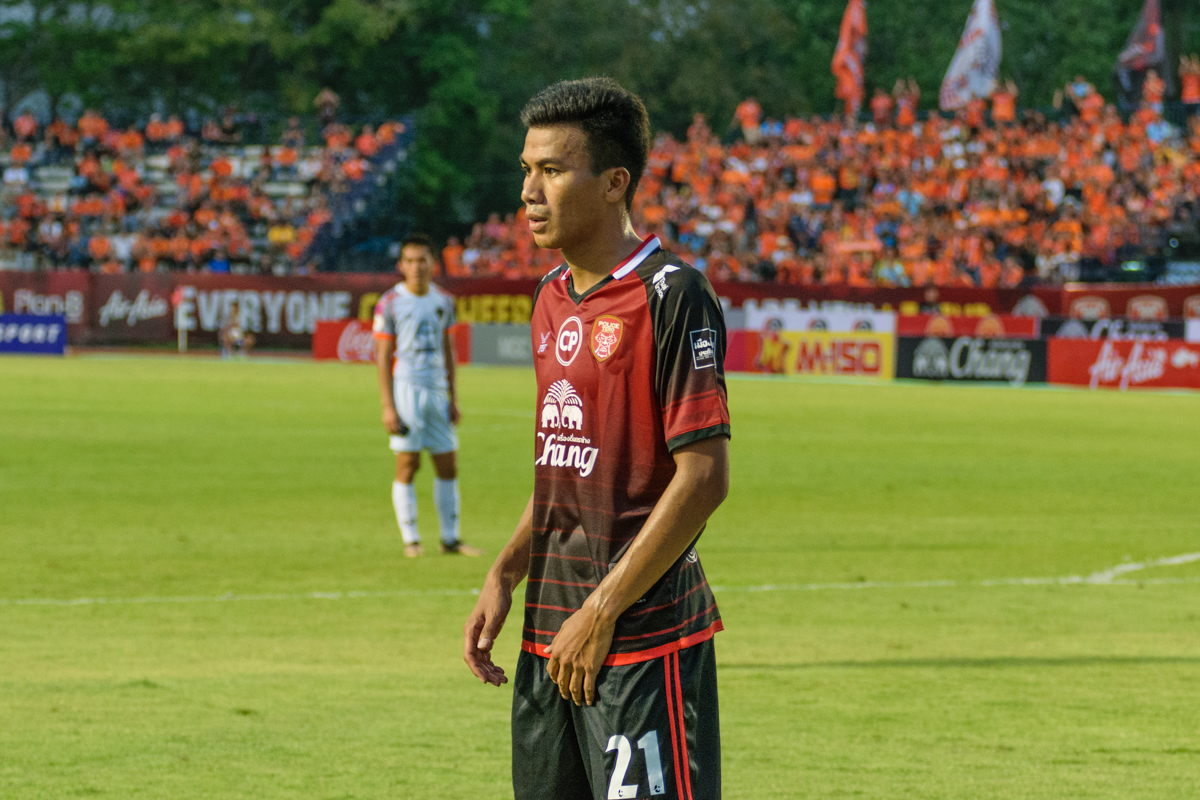

Personal information
- Full name: Teeraphol Yoryoei
- Date of birth: 25 October 1994 (age 32)
- Place of birth: Roi Et, Thailand
- Height: 1.76 m (5 ft 9 1/2 in)
- Positions: Attacking midfielder; forward

Team information
- Current team: Ratchaburi
- Number: 18

Youth career
- 2009–2012: Nakornnont Witthaya 6 Sport School

Senior career*
Years	Team	Apps	(Gls)
2013–2018	Police Tero	47	(2)
2013	→ BCC Tero (loan)	6	(0)
2016–2017	→ Army United	31	(4)
2018	Pattaya United	17	(1)
2019–2021	Samut Prakan City	76	(16)
2021–2025	Muangthong United	74	(12)
2025–	Ratchaburi	9	(2)
- * Club domestic league appearances and goals as of 07:16, 11 September 2026 (UTC)

Teeraphol Yoryoei (Thai: ธีระพล เยาะเย้ย, RTGS: Thiraphon Yoyoei, pronounced [tʰīː.rā.pʰōn jɔ́ʔ.jɤ́ːj]; born 25 October 1994) is a Thai professional footballer who plays as an attacking midfielder, he has also been used as a forward for Thai League 1 club Ratchaburi.
