= Muangthong United F.C. =

Thai football club

Muangthong United เมืองทอง ยูไนเต็ด
- Full name: Muangthong United Football Club สโมสรฟุตบอลเมืองทอง ยูไนเต็ด
- Nicknames: The Kirins (กิเลนผยอง)
- Short name: MTUTD
- Founded: 1989; 37 years ago, as Nongjorg Pittayanusorn School Football Team
- Ground: Thunderdome Stadium; Pak Kret, Nonthaburi, Thailand
- Capacity: 15,000
- Owner: Siam Sport Syndicate
- Chairman: Wilak Lohtong
- Head coach: Jose Alves Borges
- League: Thai League 2
- 2025–26: Thai League 1, 14th place (Relegated)
- Website: mtutd.com
Home colours	Away colours

Muangthong United Football Club (Thai: สโมสรฟุตบอลเมืองทอง ยูไนเต็ด) is a Thai professional football club based in Muang Thong Thani, Pak Kret district, Nonthaburi province. The club competes in the Thai League 2, the second tier of football league of Thailand. Muangthong United has participated in Thai League 1, the highest level of the Thai football league system since 2009 after having won the Thai Division 1 League title in 2008. After 17 years in the first tier league, the club experienced its first-ever relegation to the second tier in the 2025-26 season.

Muangthong United is one of Thailand's leading football clubs, having the biggest fan base with over 3.7 million followers on social media as of 14 November 2023. The club, also known as The Kirins was for a period one of the richest football clubs in Thailand.

== History ==
=== Formation and early years ===
The club, founded in 1989, was first registered with the Football Association of Thailand as the Norgjorg Pittayanusorn School Football Team. It was established by Worawi Makudi, and the team's first competition was the Ngor Royal Cup, which is the smallest cup in the Thai football league system. Even in the Thailand Division 1 League season 2002–2003, the club was renamed to FC Norgjorg Black Pearl by the former politician Veera Musikapong in an attempt to rebuild the team. However, the team was unsuccessful after just one season, so he left the club, which remained in the Thailand Division 1 League.

The next season of the Thailand League Division 1 in 2003–2004 the team was renamed once again as a group that has been done the team as FC Globlex Norgjorg by Somsak Chenchaowanich, who signed as the new team manager. That year, the team performed poorly. Finally, the club relegated to play in Ngor Royal Cup in season 2004–2005 by returning to its original name, but it was not as successful as it should have been.

=== The Kirins - 3 years 3 champs ===
The Football Association wants to raise the level of league competition in Thailand so they established Thailand Division 2 League with a team led by Khǒr Royal Cup and Khor Royal Cup are mixed together to compete in the league this season which Norgjorg Pittayanusorn Football Club eligible entrants. In 2007 Siam Sport Syndicate by Rawi Lohtong, the President of Siam Sport Syndicate bought the club and changed the name to Muangthong United Football Club and moved to a new ground at Muang Thong Thani, Thunderdome Stadium. The club's first success was winning the first place in the 2007 Season of the Thailand Division 2 League. From here, they were promoted to the Thai Division 1 League. The team was then promoted to the Thai League 1 in the 2009 season so everyone praised Muangthong United in that season as "3 Years 3 Champs".

2007	Division 2	(Tier 3)
2008	Division 1	(Tier 2)
2009	Thai Premier League	(Tier 1)

Muangthong United badge from 2009 to 2011

The club was promoted to play in the Thai Premier League in 2009, after it won the title for the Division one. In the 2009 season, the club had many new and notable players in the country. Despite a successful start to the season, they pledged in April 2009 with Attaphol Buspakom a new coach. For the summer break, the association is, as expected by all experts, among the top five of the table and plays for the championship.

Contributing to the club's success is its close relationship with Belgian club Lierse, and the acquisitions of Thai player Teeratep Winothai and Ronnachai Rangsiyo, the striker from PEA

=== The Thai giant ===
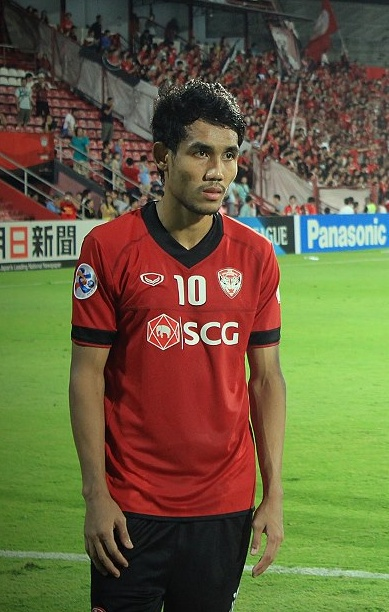
Teerasil Dangda is the club's all-time top scorer and holds the record for most games played for Muangthong United

In 2010, Attaphol Buspakom was sacked following a string of unsuccessful results, and was replaced by Belgian René Desaeyere, who managed Muangthong for two seasons. Under his leadership, Muangthong qualified for the 2010 AFC Champions League. They beat SHB Đà Nẵng from Vietnam 0–3 but lost out to Singapore Armed Forces on penalties after the game ended in a 1–1 draw. They were eligible to play for the 2010 AFC Cup. They reached the semi-final round but lost to Al-Ittihad from Syria 2–1. In the 2010 Thai Premier League, they lost just three games out of 30, with seven draws, good enough to capture the league title for the second time. Dagno Siaka was the club's top scorer for in 2010 with 15 goals.

At the start of the 2011 season Muangthong United signed former Liverpool player Robbie Fowler to a one-year contract. Muangthong United participated in the 2011 AFC Champions League play-off rounds. They played Sriwijaya but lost on penalties after the game ended in a 2–2 draw. They were also eligible to play for the 2011 AFC Cup, coming first in the group stage of the tournament. In their first match of the round of 16 they beat Al Ahed from Lebanon 4–0 but went on to lose to Kuwait SC in the quarter-finals round 1–0. After their tournament exit Henrique Calisto, the club's manager, was sacked and Fowler took over as player/coach of Muangthong United. In 2011 Thai Premier League Muangthong United finished the season in third place in Thai league. For the 2010–11 season and Teerasil Dangda is top score for club in 2011 season by 13 goals.

After Fowler's contract expired, Muangthong United signed a contract with Serbia coach Slaviša Jokanović. During the pre-season, Muangthong United signed on many famous players such as Mario Gjurovski, Ri Kwang-Chon, Adnan Barakat, Mongkol Namnuad, and the young player that crowned as best younger of Thailand etc. In 2012, Muangthong United has secured Siam Cement Group as its main sponsor. As part of the deal, the company has acquired a 30% stake in the team, invested 600 million baht, and secured the stadium's naming rights. The joint ownership between Siam Sport Syndicate and Siam Cement Group provides the team with financial stability, allowing it to invest heavily in its development.

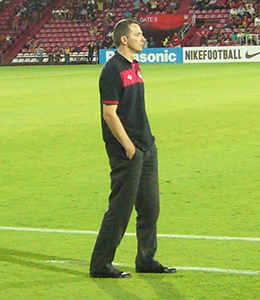
In 2012, Slaviša Jokanović became the first manager in the history of the Thai League to win a league with unbeatable in the 34-game format

In 2012 season, the club did not play in the AFC Champions League or AFC Cup. Therefore, it tried to do the best in 2012 Thai League Cup, but they lost to TOT 3–4 and 2012 Thai FA Cup they lost to Army United 3–2, but they can win the 2012 Thai Premier League is a third of the club and Muangthong United became the first team in Thai Premier League to go the season unbeaten in the current 34-game format. In 2012, Muangthong engaged an unbeaten run which lasted the whole season, and Teerasil also scored four goals in a single match, an 8–1 routing over BBCU on 18 October. Ten days later he scored in a 2–2 draw against BEC Tero Sasana, a goal which granted the title, took his tally to 24 goals and broke the previous record of Ronnachai Sayomchai in 1998 (23 goals).

After his impressive goal tally in the season, Teerasil was invited by La Liga sides Atlético Madrid and Getafe for a trial, but as the former was a Muangthong partner, he headed to Atlético Madrid in January 2013; he also attracted interest of Trabzonspor in June.

=== End of the drought ===
In 2016, Not having won any trophies for three consecutive seasons, the club started a campaign called "The Dream Team" and signed many famous national team players such as Peerapat Notchaiya, Theerathon Bunmathan, Adisak Kraisorn, Tanaboon Kesarat, Chanathip Songkrasin, Tristan Do, Adison Promrak, and international players such as Xisco. They also brought in Totchtawan Sripan, ones of Thai football legends, as the new head coach. All this resulted in Muangthong United winning the double, as they became champions of the Thai League 1 and League Cup.

In 2017, After finishing champions in the 2016 Thai League season, The Kirins secured direct qualification into the 2017 AFC Champions League. In the group stages, for Home games Muangthong beat Kashima Antlers, 2–1 and beat Ulsan Hyundai, 1-0 and beat Brisbane Roar, 3–0. The club finish runners-up in Group E, and qualified for the Round of 16 for the first time in their club history. For their home and final leg of the Champions League Round of 16 – a home and away series against Japanese side Kawasaki Frontale. Having lose the first leg, 1–3 in Thailand and Frontale defeat Muangthong United, 4–1 in the second leg. After finishing the 2017 season as runners-up with 72 points, the club achieved a historic treble, winning the League Cup, the Championship Cup, and the Mekong Club Championship. It remains one of the most successful seasons in the club's history.

=== Slip into mid-table mediocrity and relegated ===
In 2018, Following the end of the Totchtawan Sripan era, Muangthong's performance dipped, causing them to slip into mid-table. The situation worsened when their main sponsor, Siam Cement Group, withdrew its funding after season 2020, leading to significant financial struggles. Furthermore, the club's owner, media company Siam Sport Syndicate, suffered financial losses, severely impacting operations. These combined issues have clearly hampered Muangthong's chances of returning to title contention. Despite currently being a mid-table side, the club still possesses the pedigree and resources of a top team, particularly a wealth of talented youth players. This strong foundation helped them finish as runners-up in the 2023–24 League Cup and the 2024–25 FA Cup. They also competed at the continental level for the first time in 6 years in the AFC Champions League Two, reaching the round of 16.

After struggling to stay afloat for several years, Muangthong United could no longer keep pace in Thai League 1. During the 2025–26 season, they managed to collect just 26 points from 30 matches, suffering a staggering 16 defeats. This resulted in their first-ever relegation to Thai League 2, ending a 17-year run in the top flight since their promotion in 2009.

== Academy ==
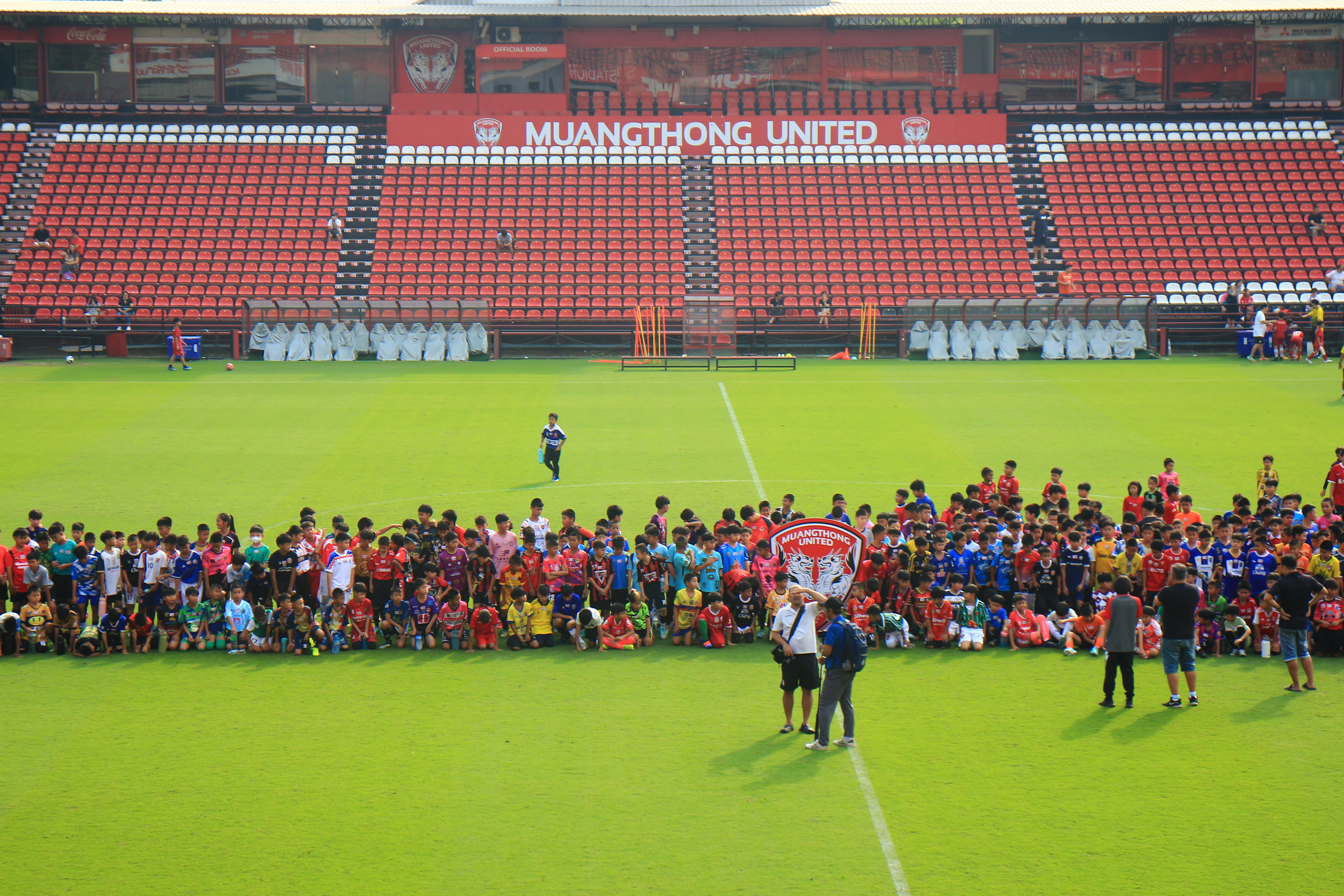
Recruitment day of the MTUTD Academy at Thunderdome Stadium in 2024

The Muangthong United Academy (MTUTD Academy) has a clear aim of providing a place to pursue and achieve success through a first-class coaching environment for all the young players registered in its system to produce players that will play and succeed in the first team at Muangthong United.

In the beginning the club use the youth development service from JMG Academy that sign an agreement with Muangthong United and Robert Procureur who was the Director of JMG Thailand on 2007 to 2011, the academy created most of the talent player such as Suriya Singmui, Phitiwat Sukjitthammakul, Weerawut Kayem, Picha Autra and Suphanan Bureerat continue to 2011 the club started an own youth development program due to AFC club licensing standard that tries to develop young player from 12 to 18 years old so that they created MTUTD Academy, from this development, the club has produced many players for the national team since Thitipan Puangchan, Korrawit Tasa, Poramet Arjvirai and Patcharapol Intanee.

== Sponsorship ==
The following are the sponsors of MTUTD (named "MTUTD Partners"):

=== Title and shirt sponsors ===
Period	Kit Manufacturer	Title Sponsor
2008	Grand Sport	Yamaha
2009–2010	Adidas	Yamaha
2011	Grand Sport	Yamaha
2012–2019	Grand Sport	SCG
2020	Shoot	SCG
2021–2024	Shoot	Yamaha
2024–	Ego Sport	Yamaha

== Supporters ==
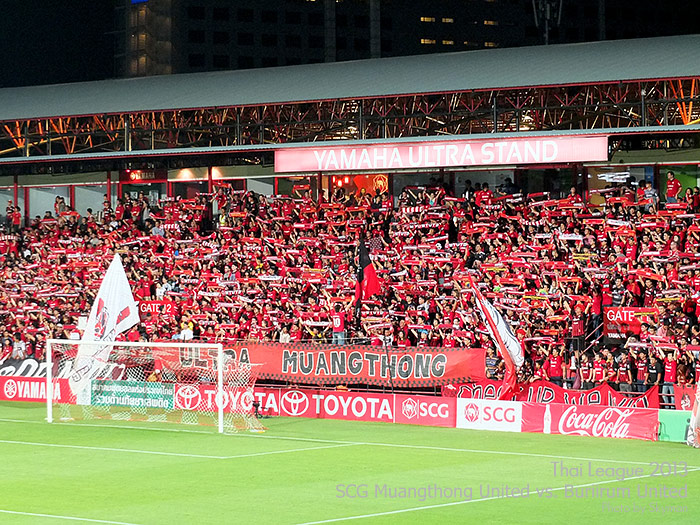
Yamaha Ultra Stand, the zone of Ultra Muangthong, the fan of Muangthong United

Muangthong United plays their home games in the SCG Stadium, originally designed for about 5,000 spectators. The stadium, unlike most stadiums in Thailand, has no running track. Due to the success of the club and the increasing number of spectators, the stadium was built with steel tube stands with 15,000 seats during the 2008 season. After the end of the 2009 season, a plan to expand the stadium was conceived. As the stadium was only originally designed for a capacity of approximately 15,000 spectators, the expansion increased the capacity to 25,000. It is also one of the few stadiums in Thailand to have VIP areas.

The club managed to develop a fan base quickly. At away games, numerous fans attend. Games against Chonburi and Bangkok Glass are among the highlights of the 2009 season. For the games against Chonburi and Bangkok Glass, there was even a first-time ticket sale. This should slow down the expected rush for tickets. For football in Thailand, this was a novelty. The core of fans of Muangthong consists of the Ultra Muangthong. They were also the first who brought the Ultras movement to Thailand's stages. Large banners, flags, and double holders characterize the Fans and a "pre-Inger" with megaphones.

== Rivalries ==
Muangthong United has main rivalries with Buriram United and Port. For the rivalries with Chonburi, against whom they contest the Thailand Clasico, and TOT SC, against whom they contest the Chaeng Watthana derby.

The rivalry with Port is rooted in Kor Royal Cup stampede when Port was forfeited due to crowd riots in 2009. In 2014 Muangthong United fans and Port fans rioted with armed rebellion at Udon Ratthaya Expressway in the Pak Kret Expressway area so the police and military came out to fix the problem. In 2016 the fans of these 2 teams were making riot it again in the same area this event made the Football Association of Thailand introduce measures for something to solve this problem.

The rivalry with Buriram United arises from the numerous times the two teams, as well as Buriram United represented as rustic people and Muangthong United represented as urban people, In the same sides these two teams represent two different politics party sides in Thailand that sent their members to elect presidents of the Football Association of Thailand, have battled for the Thai League 1 title this fixture has become known as one of the finest Thai League match-ups in history.

== Affiliated clubs ==
This is an important day for Atletico Madrid. I want to congratulate Muang Thong United for winning the Thai Premier League for the second consecutive year this is a sign of the good work the club is doing. I think this agreement will have sporting, commercial and economic benefits for both teams. I hope it will encourage more Thai fans to follow the Spanish league and more Spanish fans to follow the Thai league.

— Miguel Gil, Atletico Madrid CEO.
- (Spain) Atletico Madrid (2011–present)

Muangthong United entered a groundbreaking alliance with Spanish club Atletico Madrid in 2011. The collaboration agreement also includes "a program of periodic exchange of players and coaches", "playing friendly matches together" and "selling each other merchandise in their stadiums".

2 years later, Muangthong striker Teerasil Dangda joined Atletico for a trial in January 2013 and the club has sent youth players to practice football with Atletico Madrid, resulting in them becoming the club's key players at a later time, such as Phitiwat Sukjitthammakul, Thitiphan Puangjan and Suriya Singmui.

In 2021, the club reconsider sending the new generation of youth players to a three-month training to develop their football talents with Atletico Madrid.

- (Japan) Júbilo Iwata (2012–present)

Muangthong United signed an agreement to partner with Jubilo Iwata to exchange football strategies that will focus on the development of footballers from the youth level, including the coaching method to increase opportunities for Thai football players to practice their skills and play with leading clubs in Asia. For signing contracts, the main details of the contract include the loan and trading of players between the two clubs, the exchange of coaches to develop youth players of both clubs, joint sales of souvenir products, as well as cooperation in marketing between the two clubs, etc.

- (Thailand) Assumption United (2015–present)

Muangthong United signed a collaboration agreement with Assumption Thonburi school. In the past, many players who graduated from Assumption Thonburi school joining the Muangthong united first team such as Theerathon Bunmathan, Teerasil Dangda, Kawin Thamsatchanan, Sarach Yooyen, Chatchai Saengdao, Sorawit Panthong and Shinnaphat Leeaoh.

- (Japan) Urawa Red Diamonds (2021–present)

Muangthong United has entered a groundbreaking alliance with Japanese club Urawa Red Diamonds in 2021. This agreement will benefit both clubs through the exchange of young players and coaches, shared knowledge on technical–training methods, and playing friendly matches together.

== Stadium ==
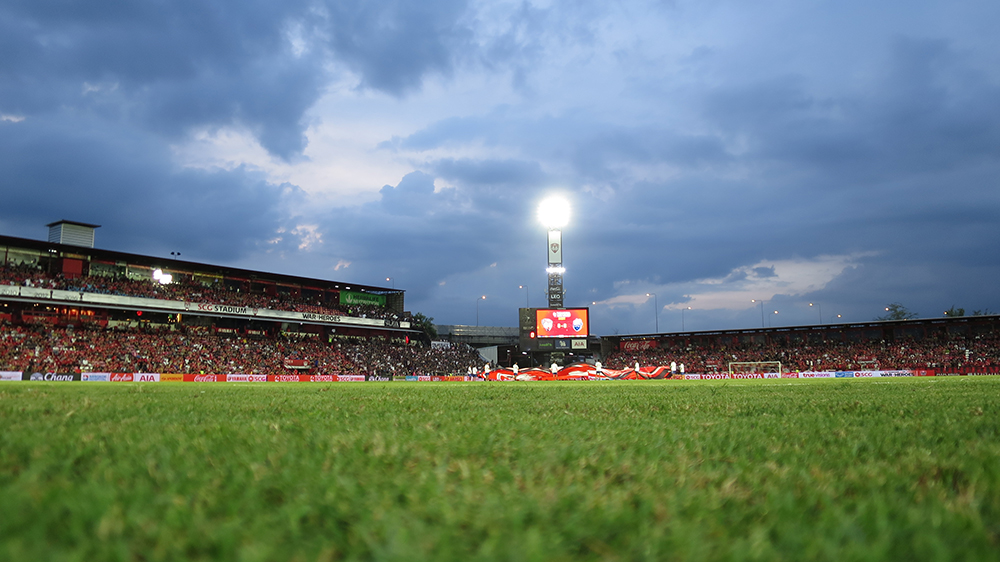
Thunderdome Stadium

Thunderdome Stadium is a football stadium located in Nonthaburi, Thailand, and is the home of Thai League 1's side, Muangthong United. Thunderdome Stadium was the first operate football stadium in Thailand, while PAT Stadium and TOT Stadium Chaeng Watthana constructed without operate including there are others older stadiums, they are all considered as multi-purpose stadiums. The stadium used to be able to hold as much as 20,000 spectators but the number reduced after renovation by filling in chairs to make the stadium all seated with a capacity of 15,000 people.

Coordinates	Location	Stadium	Capacity	Year
13°55′05″N 100°32′51″E	Nonthaburi	Thunderdome Stadium	15,000	2007–present

== Continental record ==
=== Results ===
Season	Competition	Round	Club	Home	Away	Aggregate
2010	AFC Champions League	Play-off round 1	(Vietnam) SHB Đà Nẵng	3–0		
2010	AFC Champions League	Play-off round 2	Singapore Armed Forces	0–0 (a.e.t.) (3–4 p)		
2010	AFC Cup	Group G	(Hong Kong) South China	0–1	0–0	2nd out of 4
2010	AFC Cup	Group G	(Maldives) VB Sports Club	3–1	3–2	2nd out of 4
2010	AFC Cup	Group G	(Indonesia) Persiwa Wamena	4–1	2–2	2nd out of 4
2010	AFC Cup	Round of 16	(Qatar) Al-Rayyan	1–1 (a.e.t.) (4–2 p)		
2010	AFC Cup	Quarter-finals	(Syria) Al-Karamah	2–0	0–1	2–1
2010	AFC Cup	Semi-finals	(Syria) Al-Ittihad	1–0	0–2	1–2
2011	AFC Champions League	Play-off round	(Indonesia) Sriwijaya	2–2 (a.e.t.) (6–7 p)		
2011	AFC Cup	Group G	(Vietnam) Hà Nội T&T	4–0	0–0	1st out of 4
2011	AFC Cup	Group G	(Singapore) Tampines Rovers	4–0	1–1	1st out of 4
2011	AFC Cup	Group G	(Maldives) Victory SC	1–0	4–0	1st out of 4
2011	AFC Cup	Round of 16	(Lebanon) Al-Ahed	4–0		
2011	AFC Cup	Quarter-finals	Kuwait SC	0–0	0–1	0–1
2013	AFC Champions League	Group F	(South Korea) Jeonbuk Hyundai Motors	2–2	0–2	4th out of 4
2013	AFC Champions League	Group F	(Japan) Urawa Red Diamonds	0–1	1–4	4th out of 4
2013	AFC Champions League	Group F	(China) Guangzhou Evergrande	1–4	0–4	4th out of 4
2014	AFC Champions League	Play-off round 2	(Vietnam) Hanoi T&T	2–0		
2014	AFC Champions League	Play-off round 3	(Australia) Melbourne Victory	1–2		
2016	AFC Champions League	Preliminary round 2	(Malaysia) Johor Darul Ta'zim	0–0 (a.e.t.) (3–0 p)		
2016	AFC Champions League	Play-off round	(China) Shanghai Port	0–3		
2017	AFC Champions League	Group E	(Australia) Brisbane Roar	3–0	0–0	2nd out of 4
2017	AFC Champions League	Group E	(Japan) Kashima Antlers	2–1	1–2	2nd out of 4
2017	AFC Champions League	Group E	(South Korea) Ulsan Hyundai	1–0	0–0	2nd out of 4
2017	AFC Champions League	Round of 16	(Japan) Kawasaki Frontale	1–3	1–4	2–7
2017	Mekong Club Championship	Final	(Vietnam) Sanna Khánh Hòa	4–0	3–1	7–1
2018	AFC Champions League	Preliminary round 2	(Malaysia) Johor Darul Ta'zim	5–2		
2018	AFC Champions League	Play-off round	(Japan) Kashiwa Reysol	0–3		
2024–25	AFC Champions League Two	Group H	(Malaysia) Selangor	1–1	2–1	2nd out of 4
2024–25	AFC Champions League Two	Group H	(South Korea) Jeonbuk Hyundai Motors	1–0	1–4	2nd out of 4
2024–25	AFC Champions League Two	Group H	(Philippines) Dynamic Herb Cebu	2–2	9–2	2nd out of 4
2024–25	AFC Champions League Two	Round of 16	(Singapore) Lion City Sailors	2–3	0–4	2–7

=== Statistics ===
Statistics of Muangthong United in Asian competitions.

Competition	Pld	W	D	L	GF	GA	GD	Win%
AFC Champions League	23	6	6	11	26	39	−13	26.09
AFC Champions League Two	8	3	2	3	18	17	+1	37.50
AFC Cup	20	10	6	4	34	13	+21	50.00
Mekong Club Championship	2	2	0	0	7	1	+6	100.00

== Season by season record ==
Season	League									FA Cup	League Cup	Kor Cup / Champions Cup	AFC Champions League / ACL Elite	AFC Cup / ACL Two	Mekong Club	Top scorer	
Season	Division	P	W	D	L	F	A	Pts	Pos	FA Cup	League Cup	Kor Cup / Champions Cup	AFC Champions League / ACL Elite	AFC Cup / ACL Two	Mekong Club	Name	Goals
2007	DIV 2	22	15	5	2	39	19	50	1st			–	–	–		—N/a	—N/a
2008	DIV 1	30	19	8	3	58	17	65	1st			–	–	–		Yaya Soumahoro	12
2009	TPL	30	19	8	3	48	20	65	1st	R3		–	–	–		Dagno Siaka	10
2010	TPL	30	20	7	3	64	19	67	1st	RU	R3	W	Play-off	SF		Dagno Siaka	15
2011	TPL	34	17	9	8	54	32	60	3rd	RU	QF	RU	Play-off	QF		Teerasil Dangda	13
2012	TPL	34	25	9	0	78	31	84	1st	QF	QF	–	–	–		Teerasil Dangda	24
2013	TPL	32	21	8	3	61	33	71	2nd	SF	R3	RU	GS	–		Teerasil Dangda	15
2014	TPL	38	20	11	7	66	36	62	5th	QF	QF	RU	Play-off 3	–	–	Mario Gjurovski	13
2015	TPL	34	21	8	5	81	35	71	2nd	RU	R2	–	–	–	–	Cleiton Silva	25
2016	TL	31	26	2	3	73	24	80	1st	QF	W	RU	Play-off	–	–	Cleiton Silva	27
2017	T1	34	22	6	6	79	29	72	2nd	SF	W	W	R16	–	W	Teerasil Dangda	14
2018	T1	34	16	11	7	65	53	59	4th	R3	R2	–	Play-off	–		Heberty	26
2019	T1	30	14	4	12	45	42	46	5th	R3	R1	–	–	–		Heberty	14
2020–21	T1	30	14	5	11	52	43	47	7th	QF	–	–	–	–		Sardor Mirzaev	13
2021–22	T1	30	13	10	7	46	35	49	4th	R3	R1	–	–	–		Willian Popp	15
2022–23	T1	30	14	8	8	56	37	50	4th	R4	R2	–	–	–		Willian Popp	14
2023–24	T1	30	16	4	10	64	45	52	5th	R2	RU	–	–	–		Willian Popp	17
2024–25	T1	30	13	6	11	46	39	45	6th	RU	R1	–	–	R16		Kakana Khamyok	8
2025–26	T1	30	6	8	16	27	52	26	14th	R2	R2	–	–	–		Melvyn Lorenzen	5
2026–27	T2									R1		–	–	–			

Champions	Runners-up	Third place	Promoted	Relegated

- P = Played
- W = Games won
- D = Games drawn
- L = Games lost
- F = Goals for
- A = Goals against
- Pts = Points
- Pos = Final position
- N/A = No answer
- TPL = Thai Premier League
- TL = Thai League
- T1 = Thai League 1
- T2 = Thai League 2
- DIV 1 = Division 1
- DIV 2 = Division 2
- QR1 = First Qualifying Round
- QR2 = Second Qualifying Round
- QR3 = Third Qualifying Round
- QR4 = Fourth Qualifying Round
- RInt = Intermediate Round
- R1 = Round 1
- R2 = Round 2
- R3 = Round 3
- R4 = Round 4
- R5 = Round 5
- R6 = Round 6
- GS = Group stage
- R16 = Round of 16
- QF = Quarter-finals
- SF = Semi-finals
- RU = Runners-up
- S = Shared
- W = Winners

== Current squad ==
Note: Flags indicate national team as defined under FIFA eligibility rules; some limited exceptions apply. Players may hold more than one non-FIFA nationality.

No.	Pos.	Nation	Player
1	GK	THA	Korrakot Pipatnadda
2	MF	THA	Nitisak Anulun
4	MF	THA	Theekawin Chansri
5	MF	THA	Theerapat Nanthakowat
6	DF	THA	Songwut Kraikruan
7	MF	THA	Pakorn Prempak
8	MF	THA	Wongsakorn Chaikultewin
9	FW	BRA	Rivaldinho (on loan from Bangkok United)
10	FW	THA	Poramet Arjvirai (Vice-captain)
11	MF	THA	Jaroensak Wonggorn (Captain)
14	MF	THA	Thitiphan Khanoeinham
17	FW	THA	Sarayut Yoosuebchuea
18	MF	THA	Jessadakorn Noysri

No.	Pos.	Nation	Player
19	DF	THA	James Bakorn Falconer
21	MF	THA	Nontawat Onsuebsai
22	DF	THA	Natthawat Thobansong
23	MF	THA	Siradanai Phosri
24	MF	THA	Danuphon Buppha
25	DF	THA	Chatnipat Janpong
26	GK	THA	Kanapod Kadee
27	DF	PHI	Michael Kempter
28	DF	KOR	Kim Dong-su
31	GK	THA	Komsan Saipipat
36	MF	THA	Pichaya Kongsri (on loan from Bangkok United)
45	FW	GER	Streli Mamba

Note 1: The official club website lists the supporters as player 12th man.

=== Out on loan ===
Note: Flags indicate national team as defined under FIFA eligibility rules; some limited exceptions apply. Players may hold more than one non-FIFA nationality.

No.	Pos.	Nation	Player
15	DF	THA	Jaturapat Sattham (at Chonburi)
—	DF	THA	Chutikom Klinchampasri (at Sisaket United)

No.	Pos.	Nation	Player
—	DF	THA	Arthit Buangam (at Burapha United)
—	GK	THA	Rithisak Kalaya (at Muang Loei United)

== Managerial history ==
Head coaches by years (2007–present)

Period	Name
2007	(Thailand) Nopporn Eksrattra
2007 – 2008	(Thailand) Surasak Tungsurat
2009	(Thailand) Attaphol Buspakom
11 Jan 2010 – 7 Jan 2011	(Belgium) René Desaeyere
18 Jan 2011 – 28 Feb 2011	(Brazil) Carlos Roberto
6 Mar 2011 – 29 Sep 2011	(Portugal) Henrique Calisto
1 Oct 2011 – 31 Jan 2012	(England) Robbie Fowler
27 Feb 2012 – 4 Jun 2013	(Serbia) Slaviša Jokanović
5 Jun 2013 – 16 Jul 2013	(Germany) Winfried Schäfer (caretaker)
19 Jul 2013 – 31 Dec 2013	(Belgium) René Desaeyere
2 Jan 2014 – 30 Mar 2014	(England) Scott Cooper
2 Jul 2014 – 19 Jan 2016	(Croatia) Dragan Talajić
21 Jan 2016 – 12 Mar 2018	(Thailand) Totchtawan Sripan
30 Apr 2018 – 5 Oct 2018	(Serbia) Radovan Ćurčić
22 Nov 2018 – 1 Apr 2019	(Thailand) Pairoj Borwonwatanadilok
1 Apr 2019 – 7 Apr 2019	(Thailand) Uthai Boonmoh (caretaker)
9 Apr 2019 – 12 Jun 2019	(South Korea) Yoon Jong-hwan
13 Jun 2019 – 17 Oct 2020	(Brazil) Alexandre Gama
19 Oct 2020 – 18 Sep 2023	(North Macedonia) Mario Gjurovski
18 Sep 2023 – 26 Nov 2023	(Thailand) Uthai Boonmoh (caretaker)
27 Nov 2023 – 23 Jun 2024	(Serbia) Miloš Joksić
5 Jul 2024 – 25 May 2025	(Italy) Gino Lettieri
28 May 2025 – 25 Oct 2025	(Thailand) Rangsan Viwatchaichok
27 Oct 2025 – 29 Dec 2025	(Thailand) Uthai Boonmoh (caretaker)
29 Dec 2025 – 28 Feb 2026	(Croatia) Mario Ivanković
1 Mar 2026 –	(Brazil) Jose Alves Borges

== Honours ==
=== Domestic competitions ===
==== League ====
- Thai League 1
  - Winners (4): 2009, 2010, 2012, 2016
  - Runners-up (3): 2013, 2015, 2017
- Thai League 2
  - Winners (1): 2008
- Regional League Division 2
  - Champions (1): 2007

==== Cups ====
- Kor Royal Cup:
  - Champions (1): 2010
  - Runners-up (4): 2011, 2013, 2014, 2016
- FA Cup:
  - Runners-up (4): 2010, 2011, 2015, 2024–25
- League Cup:
  - Champions (2): 2016, 2017
  - Runners-up (1): 2023–24
- Thailand Champions Cup:
  - Champions (1): 2017

=== International competitions ===
==== ASEAN ====
- Mekong Club Championship
  - Champions (1): 2017

== See also ==
- List of Muangthong United F.C. players
