= 2025–26 Muangthong United F.C. season =

Muangthong United
2025–26 season
- Chairman: (Thailand) Wilak Lohtong
- Manager: (Thailand) Rangsan Viwatchaichok (until 25 October 2025) (Thailand) Uthai Boonmoh (until 29 December 2025) (Croatia) Mario Ivanković (until 28 February 2026) (Brazil) Jose Alves Borges (from 28 February 2026)
- Stadium: Thunderdome Stadium, Pak Kret, Nonthaburi, Thailand
Home colours	Away colours	Third colours

The 2025–26 season is Muangthong United Football Club's 19th season since they took over from Nongchok Pittaya Nusorn Football Club in 2007. It is the club's 17th consecutive season in the top flight of the Thai football league system since being promoted in the 2009 season.

On June 25, 2024, Thai League announced the program for the upcoming 2025–26 Thai League 1 season. The season commenced on August 9, 2024, and will conclude on April 27, 2025.

== Squad ==
As of 26 May 2025

Squad No.	Name	Nationality	Date of birth (age)	Previous club
Goalkeepers
1	Armin Gremsl	(Austria)	13 August 1994 (age 31)	(Austria) SKU Amstetten
33	Korrakot Pipatnadda	(Thailand)	15 July 1999 (age 26)	(Thailand) Rayong
Defenders
3	Wattanakorn Sawatlakhorn	(Thailand)	23 May 1998 (age 28)	(Thailand) Ayutthaya United
4	Stefan Tsonkov	(Bulgaria)	24 January 1995 (age 31)	(Bulgaria) Hebar
5	Nelson Orji	(Nigeria)	5 April 2002 (age 24)	(Slovenia) NK Brežice 1919
6	John-Patrick Strauß	(Philippines) (Germany)	28 January 1996 (age 30)	(Germany) FC Hansa Rostock
13	James Pakorn Falconer	(Thailand) (England)	19 August 2005 (age 20)	Youth Team
19	Tristan Do (Vice-captain)	(Thailand) (France)	31 January 1993 (age 33)	(Thailand) Bangkok United
27	Michael Kempter	(Philippines) (Switzerland)	12 January 1995 (age 31)	(Switzerland) Grasshopper
28	Kim Dong-su	(South Korea)	21 February 1995 (age 31)	(Vietnam) SHB Da Nang
29	Songwut Kraikruan	(Thailand)	6 November 2001 (age 24)	(Thailand) Ayutthaya United
48	Donthachai Deephom	(Thailand)	9 June 2005 (age 21)	(Thailand) Assumption United
Midfielders
14	Sorawit Panthong	(Thailand)	20 February 1997 (age 29)	(Thailand) Police Tero
16	Wongsakorn Chaikultewin	(Thailand)	16 September 1996 (age 29)	(Thailand) Trat
17	Payanat Thodsanid	(Thailand)	10 July 2002 (age 23)	(Thailand) Kohkwang United
18	Danuphon Buppha	(Thailand)	15 January 2008 (age 18)	(Thailand) Assumption United
21	Purachet Thodsanit	(Thailand)	9 May 2001 (age 25)	(Thailand) Ayutthaya United
22	Thiraphat Nuntagowat	(Thailand)	5 January 2005 (age 21)	(Thailand) Assumption United
23	Siradanai Phosri	(Thailand)	6 September 2005 (age 20)	(Thailand) Assumption United
34	Kakana Khamyok	(Thailand)	21 May 2004 (age 22)	(Thailand) Assumption United
35	Theekawin Chansri	(Thailand)	17 February 2004 (age 22)	(Thailand) Ayutthaya United
36	Piyanut Thodsanit	(Thailand)	10 July 2002 (age 23)	(Thailand) Kohkwang United
39	Kittapak Seangsawat	(Thailand)	8 April 2005 (age 21)	Youth Team
Strikers
7	Willian Popp	(Brazil)	13 April 1994 (age 32)	(China) Shanghai Port (C1)
8	Korawich Tasa	(Thailand)	7 April 2000 (age 26)	(Thailand) Ratchaburi
9	Melvyn Lorenzen	(Uganda) (Germany) (England)	26 November 1994 (age 31)	(Thailand) BG Pathum United
10	Poramet Arjvirai	(Thailand)	20 July 1998 (age 27)	(Thailand) Bangkok
11	Emil Roback	(Sweden) (The Gambia)	3 May 2003 (age 23)	(Italy) Milan Futuro
18	Kenan Dünnwald-Turan	(Germany)	14 November 1995 (age 30)	(Bulgaria) Hebar
20	Sarayut Yoosuebchuea	(Thailand)	11 May 2000 (age 26)	Youth Team
24	Anass Ahannach	(Morocco) (Netherlands)	7 February 1998 (age 28)	(Netherlands) FC Den Bosch
45	Marko Šarić	(Serbia)	28 November 1998 (age 27)	(Serbia) FK Napredak Kruševac
Players loaned out
3	Chatchai Saengdao	(Thailand)	11 January 1997 (age 29)	(Thailand) PT Prachuap
15	Jaturapat Sattham	(Thailand)	15 June 1999 (age 27)	(Thailand) Port
26	Kanapod Kadee	(Thailand)	26 June 2002 (age 23)	(Thailand) Samutsongkhram
28	Arthit Buangam	(Thailand)	27 January 2002 (age 24)	Youth Team
67	Nitisak Anulun	(Thailand)	11 February 2003 (age 23)	(Thailand) Assumption United
	Natthawat Thobansong	(Thailand)	22 April 1998 (age 28)	(Thailand) Trat
Players left club during season
31	Richmond Darko	(Ghana)	12 February 2002 (age 24)	(Ghana) FC Samartex
37	Batata Zampier	(Brazil)	27 December 2005 (age 20)	(Brazil) Aster Itaquá
40	Kasidech Wettayawong	(Thailand)	21 January 1994 (age 32)	(Thailand) PT Prachuap
	Diego Reis	(Brazil)	24 February 2005 (age 21)	(Brazil) Aster Itaquá

== Transfer ==
=== In ===
Pre-season transfer

Date	Position	Player	Transferred from	Fee	Ref
First team
1 July 2025	GK	(Thailand) Korrakot Pipatnadda	(Thailand) Rayong	Loan Return	
1 July 2025	DF	(Philippines) (Switzerland) Michael Kempter	(Switzerland) Grasshopper	Free	
1 July 2025	DF	(Thailand) Natthawat Thobansong	(Thailand) Trat	Loan Return	(Note: Natthawat Thobansong loan curtailed before loan to Trat FC.)
1 July 2025	DF	(Thailand) Anusak Jaiphet	(Thailand) Trat	Loan Return	
1 July 2025	DF	(Thailand) Theerapat Laohabut	(Thailand) Nakhon Pathom United	Loan Return	
1 July 2025	DF	(Thailand) Sathaporn Daengsee	(Thailand) Mahasarakham SBT	Loan Return	
1 July 2025	DF	(Thailand) Chayapol Supma	(Thailand) Kasetsart	Loan Return	
1 July 2025	FW	(Thailand) Sarayut Yoosuebchuea	(Thailand) Kasetsart	Loan Return	
1 July 2025	FW	(Thailand) Jessadakorn Noysri	(Thailand) Kasetsart	Loan Return	
1 July 2025	FW	(Indonesia) (Liberia) Ronaldo Kwateh	(Thailand) Mahasarakham SBT	Loan Return	
1 July 2025	FW	(Uganda) (Germany) (England) Melvyn Lorenzen	(Thailand) BG Pathum United	Free	
4 July 2025	DF	(Nigeria) Nelson Orji	(Slovenia) NK Brežice 1919 (S3)	Free	
8 July 2025	GK	(Austria) Armin Gremsl	(Austria) SKU Amstetten (S3)	Free	
9 July 2025	MF	(Brazil) Diego Reis	(Brazil) Aster Itaquá (B2)	Free	
9 July 2025	FW	(Brazil) (Italy) Batata Zampier	(Brazil) Aster Itaquá (B2)	Free	
11 July 2025	MF	(Ghana) Richmond Darko	(Ghana) FC Samartex (G1)	Free	
28 July 2025	DF	(Bulgaria) Stefan Tsonkov	(Bulgaria) Hebar (B2)	Free	
9 August 2025	MF	(Netherlands) (Morocco) Anass Ahannach	Free Agent	N.A.	
28 August 2025	FW	(Germany) Kenan Dünnwald-Turan	(Bulgaria) Hebar (B2)	Free	
Academy
1 July 2025	DF	(Thailand) Chutikom Klinchampasri	(Thailand) Navy	Loan Return	

Mid-season transfer

Date	Position	Player	Transferred from	Fee	Ref
First team
18 December 2025	MF	(Brazil) Diego Reis	(Thailand) Assumption United	End of loan	(Note: Diego Reis released after returned.)
18 December 2025	MF	(Thailand) Wongsakorn Chaikultewin	(Thailand) Trat	End of loan	
31 December 2025	DF	(South Korea) Kim Dong-su	(Vietnam) SHB Da Nang	Free	
15 January 2026	FW	(Serbia) Marko Šarić	(Serbia) FK Napredak Kruševac	Free	18 months contract till Jun-27
16 January 2026	DF	(Thailand) Wattanakorn Sawatlakhorn	(Thailand) Ayutthaya United	Undisclosed	
27 April 2026	FW	(Thailand) Poramet Arjvirai	(Japan) Jubilo Iwata (J2)	End of loan	
Academy
16 January 2026	MF	(Thailand) Danuphon Buppha	(Thailand) Assumption United	Free	

=== Out ===
Preseason

Date	Position	Player	Transferred from	Fee	Ref
First team
18 December 2024	DF	(Thailand) Natthawat Thobansong	(Thailand) Trat (T2)	Season loan	
13 June 2025	DF	(South Korea) Hong Jeong-un	(South Korea) Daegu FC (K2)	Free	
28 June 2025	MF	(Singapore) (Denmark) Jacob Mahler	(Singapore) BG Tampines Rovers (S1)	Free	
30 June 2025	GK	(Thailand) Kittipong Phuthawchueak	(Thailand) BG Pathum United	End of Loan	
30 June 2025	FW	(Uganda) (Germany) (England) Melvyn Lorenzen	(Thailand) BG Pathum United	End of Loan	(Note: Melvyn Lorenzen's contract end and rejoin permanently.)
1 July 2025	DF	(Thailand) Sathaporn Daengsee	(Thailand)	Free	
1 July 2025	DF	(Thailand) Chayapol Supma	(Thailand) Kasetsart (T2)	Free	
1 July 2025	FW	(Thailand) Jessadakorn Noysri	(Thailand) Kasetsart (T2)	Free	
1 July 2025	MF	(Thailand) Picha Autra	(Malaysia) Selangor (M1)	Free	
1 July 2025	FW	(Indonesia) (Liberia) Ronaldo Kwateh	(Indonesia) Semen Padang (I1)	Free	
3 July 2025	GK	(Thailand) Peerapong Ruennin	(Thailand) Trat (T2)	Free	
4 July 2025	DF	(France) (Senegal) Aly Cissokho	(Thailand) Lamphun Warriors	Free	
6 July 2025	FW	(Thailand) Poramet Arjvirai	(Japan) Jubilo Iwata (J2)	Season loan	
8 July 2025	MF	(Thailand) Teeraphol Yoryoei	(Thailand) Ratchaburi	Free	
11 July 2025	DF	(Thailand) Theerapat Laohabut	(Thailand) Sisaket United (T2)	Free	
14 July 2025	DF	(Uzbekistan) Abbos Otakhonov	(Uzbekistan) FC Khorazm (U1)	Free	
2 August 2025	MF	(Brazil) Diego Reis	(Thailand) Assumption United (T3)	Season loan	
2 August 2025	MF	(Thailand) Nitisak Anulun	(Thailand) Assumption United (T3)	Season loan	
28 August 2025	DF	(Thailand) Chatchai Saengdao	(Thailand) Trat (T2)	Season loan	
28 August 2025	MF	(Thailand) Wongsakorn Chaikultewin	(Thailand) Trat (T2)	Loan for Leg 1	
31 August 2025	FW	(Brazil) (Italy) Batata Zampier	(Italy) Chievo (I4)	Free	
Academy
3 July 2025	DF	(Thailand) Chutikom Klinchampasri	(Thailand) Sisaket United (T2)	Free	

Mid-season

Date	Position	Player	Transferred from	Fee	Ref
First team
19 December 2025	MF	(Thailand) Kasidech Wettayawong	(Thailand) Burapha United	Free	
19 December 2025	MF	(Brazil) Diego Reis	(Thailand) Samut Sakhon City	Free	
19 December 2025	DF	(Thailand) Arthit Buangam	(Thailand) Burapha United	Season loan	
5 January 2026	DF	(Thailand) Jaturapat Sattham	(Thailand) Rayong	Season loan	
10 January 2026	DF	(Ghana) Richmond Darko	(Thailand) Chonburi	Free	
12 January 2026	GK	(Thailand) Kanapod Kadee	(Thailand) Burapha United	Season Loan	

== Friendlies ==
=== Pre-Season Friendly ===
Win Draw Loss

6 July 2025	Muangthong United (Thailand)	3–0	(Thailand) North Bangkok University	Nonthaburi
				Stadium: Thunderdome Stadium

9 July 2025	Muangthong United (Thailand)	5–0	(Thailand) Kasetsart F.C.	Nonthaburi
				Stadium: Thunderdome Stadium

12 July 2025	Muangnont FC (Thailand)	2–5	(Thailand) Muangthong United	Nakhon Ratchasima
				Stadium: Gillen Valley Stadium

16 July 2025	Nakhon Ratchasima (Thailand)	1–2	(Thailand) Muangthong United	Nakhon Ratchasima
	Goal		Melvyn Lorenzen	Stadium: 80th Birthday Stadium

26 July 2025	Muangthong United (Thailand)	2–0	(Thailand) Chachoengsao Hi-Tek	Nonthaburi
				Stadium: Thunderdome Stadium

31 July 2025	Muangthong United (Thailand)	3–1	(Thailand) PT Prachuap	Nonthaburi
	Emil Roback 40'; Melvyn Lorenzen 56', 67'			Stadium: Thunderdome Stadium

=== Mid-Season Friendly ===
Win Draw Loss

15 November 2025	Muangthong United (Thailand)	2–0	(Thailand) Police Tero FC	Nonthaburi
				Stadium: Thunderdome Stadium

== Competitions ==
=== Thai League 1 ===
16 August 2025 1	Muangthong United	1–0	Sukhothai	Nonthaburi
	Stefan Tsonkov 85'; John-Patrick Strauß (yellow card) 24'; Kasidech Wettayawong (yellow card) 36'			Stadium: Thunderdome Stadium; Attendance: 4,723; Referee: Chaireag Ngamsom

23 August 2025 2	Ayutthaya United	2–2	Muangthong United	Ayutthaya
	Chananan Pombuppha 5', 12'; Hwang Hyun-soo (yellow card) 26'; Airfan Doloh (yellow card) 45'		Melvyn Lorenzen 80' (pen.), 90+11' (pen.); Kasidech Wettayawong (yellow card) 59'; Nattapon Worasut (yellow card) 69'	Stadium: Ayutthaya Province Stadium; Attendance: 4,316; Referee: Winat Phophat

31 August 2025 3	Muangthong United	2–0	Kanchanaburi Power	Nonthaburi
	Melvyn Lorenzen 72'; Korawich Tasa 90+2'		Diego Bardanca (yellow card) 45'; Gerson Rodriguesa (yellow card) 90+5'	Stadium: Thunderdome Stadium; Attendance: 6,380; Referee: Wiwat Jumpaoon

14 September 2025 4	Rayong	2–0	Muangthong United	Rayong
	Stefan Cebara 26' (yellow card) 45'; Seksan Ratree 68'; Stênio Júnior (yellow card) 33'; Worawut Srisupha (yellow card) 83'			Stadium: Rayong Province Stadium; Attendance: 4,019; Referee: Pawara Seejen

21 September 2025 5	Muangthong United	1–3	Ratchaburi	Nonthaburi
	Kakana Khamyok (yellow card) 3'; Sorawit Panthong 78'		Teeraphol Yoryoei 53'; Njiva Rakotoharimalala 74'; Denílson 90+8'; Gabriel Mutombo (yellow card) 13'; Thossawat Limwannasathian (yellow card) 58'; Jérémy Corinus (yellow card) 87'; Jakkaphan Kaewprom (yellow card) 90+3'	Stadium: Thunderdome Stadium; Attendance: 5,173; Referee: Phairot Bunkamnoed

28 September 2025 6	Nakhon Ratchasima	1–1	Muangthong United	Nakhon Ratchasima
	Dennis Murillo 82' (pen.) (yellow card) 82'; Anusak Jaiphet (yellow card) 67'; Ratthasart Bangsungnoen (yellow card) 83'		Kenan Dünnwald-Turan 59'; Sorawit Panthong (yellow card) 33'; Anass Ahannach (yellow card) 90+6'; John-Patrick Strauß (yellow card) 90+8'	Stadium: 80th Birthday Stadium; Attendance: 5,221; Referee: Veeraporn Maophaeo

3 October 2025 7	Lamphun Warriors	2–2	Muangthong United	Lamphun
	Mohammed Osman 9'; Anan Yodsangwal 51'; Willen (yellow card) 55'; Todsapol Lated (yellow card) 60'		Kenan Dünnwald-Turan 13'; Anass Ahannach 41'; John-Patrick Strauß (yellow card) 61'; Tristian Do (yellow card) 90+6'	Stadium: Lamphun Province Stadium; Attendance: 3,147; Referee: Chaireag Ngam-som

18 October 2025 8	Muangthong United	0–0	Bangkok United	Nonthaburi
	Tristian Do (yellow card) 55'			Stadium: Thunderdome Stadium; Attendance: 5,178; Referee: Songkran Bunmeekiart

24 October 2025 9	Port	1–0	Muangthong United	Bangkok
	Lucas Tocantins 79'; Noboru Shimura (yellow card) 83'		Nelson Orji (yellow card) 39'; Kenan Dünnwald-Turan (yellow card) 48'	Stadium: PAT Stadium; Attendance: 6,250; Referee: Mongkolchai Pechsri

2 November 2025 10	Muangthong United	1–4	PT Prachuap	Nonthaburi
	Emil Roback 61'; Nelson Orji (yellow card) 53'; Kasidech Wettayawong (red card) 71'; Sorawit Panthong (yellow card) 65' (yellow-red card); John-Patrick Strauß (yellow card) 90'		Edgar Méndez 2'; Iklas Sanron 20'; Tauã 46'; Michel 90'; Jesper Nyholm (yellow card) 48'; Phanthamit Praphanth (yellow card) 90+4'	Stadium: Thunderdome Stadium; Attendance: 2,887; Referee: Phairot Bunkamnoed

8 November 2025 11	Uthai Thani	3–1	Muangthong United	Uthai Thani
	Mohamed Eisa 37'; Harhys Stewart 43'; Marcelo Djaló 85'; Chirawat Wangthaphan (yellow card) 74'		Kenan Dünnwald-Turan 45'; Melvyn Lorenzen (yellow card) 55'	Stadium: Uthai Thani Province Stadium; Attendance: 2,657; Referee: Panumas Phansamo

22 November 2025 12	Muangthong United	0–5	Buriram United	Nonthaburi
	Kenan Dünnwald-Turan (yellow card) 32'; Nelson Orji (yellow card) 85'		Robert Žulj 17', 50', 53'; Guilherme Bissoli 44', 83' (yellow card) 85'	Stadium: Thunderdome Stadium; Attendance: 4,346; Referee: Torpong Somsingha

29 November 2025 13	Chiangrai United	0–2	Muangthong United	Chiangrai
	Thanawat Pimyotha (yellow card) 29'; Piyaphon Phanichakul (yellow card) 90+1'		Emil Roback 5'; Sorawit Panthong 50'; John-Patrick Strauß (yellow card) 65'; Songwut Kraikruan (yellow card) 25' (yellow-red card)	Stadium: Singha Chiangrai Stadium; Attendance: 10,965; Referee: Pawaran Seejen

6 December 2025 14	Muangthong United	2–3	Chonburi	Nonthaburi
	Anass Ahannach 68'; Melvyn Lorenzen 87'; Tristian Do (yellow card) 60'; Kakana Khamyok (yellow card) 90+2'; Siradanai Phosri (yellow card) 90+5'		Oege Sietse van Lingen 41', 56'; Nattanan Biesamrit 61' (yellow card) 70'; Chayathorn Tapsuvanavon (yellow card) 31'; Pathomchai Seaisakul (yellow card) 77'; Jonathan Bolingi (yellow card) 90+4'	Stadium: Thunderdome Stadium; Attendance: 4,918; Referee: Mongkolchai Pechsri

14 December 2025 15	BG Pathum United	3–0	Muangthong United	Pathum Thani
	Chanathip Songkrasin 20'; Tomoyuki Doi 40', 65' (yellow card) 39'; Kritsada Kaman (yellow card) 15'			Stadium: True BG Stadium; Attendance: 10,130; Referee: Peerasan Krataithong

10 January 2026 16	Muangthong United	0–1	Ayutthaya United	Nonthaburi
	Tristan Do (yellow card) 63'		Kritsana Kasemkulvilai 56'; Wellington Priori (yellow card) 66'; Passakorn Biaothungoi (yellow card) 88'; Chakkit Laptrakul (yellow card) 90+1'; Chiraphong Raksongkham (yellow card) 90+3'	Stadium: Thunderdome Stadium; Attendance: 3,756; Referee: Woottipong Ketkam

17 January 2026 17	Kanchanaburi Power	3–0	Muangthong United	Kanchanaburi
	Aboubakar Kamara 25' (yellow card) 27'; Andros Townsend 53'; Santipap Ratniyorm 89'; Chayapipat Supunpasuch (yellow card) 56'; Gerson Rodrigues (yellow card) 68'		Kim Dong-Su (yellow card) 30'; John-Patrick Strauß (yellow card) 35'; Anass Ahannach (yellow card) 55'	Stadium: Kanchanaburi Province Stadium; Attendance: 3,586; Referee: Torpong Somsingha

25 January 2026 18 (Rescheduled)	Muangthong United	1–3	Rayong	Nonthaburi
	Melvyn Lorenzen 87' (pen.); Kim Dong-Su (yellow card) 56'; Payanat Thodsanid (red card) 78'		Stênio Junior 12', 90+2'; Matee Sarakum 60'; Kritsada Nontharat (yellow card) 82'	Stadium: Thunderdome Stadium; Attendance: 2,761; Referee: Mongkolchai Pechsri

1 February 2026 19	Ratchaburi	3–2	Muangthong United	Ratchaburi
	Gleyson 45+6'; Denílson 53'; Jakkaphan Kaewprom 66' (yellow card) 79'; Negueba (yellow card) 90+3'		Theerapat Nanthakowat 23'; Willian Popp 90'; Wattanakorn Sawatlakhorn (yellow card) 37'; Marko Saric (yellow card) 51'; Kakana Khamyok (yellow card) 71'; Kim Dong-Su (yellow card) 90+6'	Stadium: Ratchaburi Stadium; Attendance: 3,999; Referee: Natee Choosuwan

18 April 2026 20 (Rescheduled)	Muangthong United	2–1	Nakhon Ratchasima	Nonthaburi
	Anusak Jaiphet 81' (o.g.); Willian Popp 90+9' (pen.); Stefan Tsonkov (yellow card) 16'; Siradanai Phosri (yellow card) 73'		Leon James 48'; Wendel (yellow card) 22'; Pongsakron Hanrattana (yellow card) 68'; Hirotaka Mita (yellow card) 73'; Ratthasart Bangsungnoen (yellow card) 75'	Stadium: Thunderdome Stadium; Attendance: 4,785; Referee: Warintorn Sassadee

15 February 2026 21 (Rescheduled)	Muangthong United	1–1	Lamphun Warriors	Nonthaburi
	Marko Šarić 82'; Sorawit Panthong (yellow card) 11'; Kakana Khamyok (yellow card) 42'; Willian Popp (yellow card) 47'		Anan Yodsangwal 88'; Dominik Schad (yellow card) 40'; Baworn Tapla (yellow card) 55'; Tawan Khotsupho (yellow card) 67'; Ralph (yellow card) 76'	Stadium: Thunderdome Stadium; Attendance: 4,425; Referee: Songkran Bunmeekiart

22 February 2026 22	Bangkok United	2–0	Muangthong United	Pathum Thani
	Nebojša Kosović 3', 47'		Willian Popp (yellow card) 27'; Siradanai Phosri (yellow card) 29'	Stadium: True BG Stadium; Attendance: 2,285; Referee: Warintorn Sassadee

1 March 2026 23	Muangthong United	0–0	Port	Nonthaburi
	Wattanakorn Sawatlakhorn (yellow card) 22'; Tristan Do (yellow card) 58'; Kakana Khamyok (yellow card) 22'; Willian Popp (yellow card) 90+2'		Teerasak Poeiphimai (yellow card) 45'; Peerawat Akkratum (yellow card) 82'	Stadium: Thunderdome Stadium; Attendance: 6,781; Referee: Wiwat Jumpaoon

7 March 2026 24	PT Prachuap	2–1	Muangthong United	Prachuap Khiri Khan
	Michel 8'; Edgar Méndez 35' (pen.); Phanthamit Praphanth (yellow card) 54'; Koki Tsukagawa (yellow card) 79'		Stefan Tsonkov 82' (yellow card) 76'; Songwut Kraikruan (yellow card) 25'; Sorawit Panthong (yellow card) 37'	Stadium: Sam Ao Stadium; Attendance: 3,437; Referee: Torpong Somsingha

14 March 2026 25	Muangthong United	1–0	Uthai Thani	Nonthaburi
	Kakana Khamyok 7' (yellow card) 53'; Tristan Do (yellow card) 84'; Willian Popp (yellow card) 86'		Bruno Baio (yellow card) 27' (yellow-red card) 68'; Martin Angha (yellow card) 55'	Stadium: Thunderdome Stadium; Attendance: 3,856; Referee: Natee Choosuwan

22 March 2025 26	Buriram United	2–1	Muangthong United	Buriram
	Rubén Sánchez 12'; Thanakrit Chotmuangpak 44'; Kenny Dougall (yellow card) 7'; Peter Žulj (yellow card) 90+1'		Marko Šarić 33' (penalty missed) 8; Dong-Su Kim (yellow card) 57'; Siradanai Phosri (yellow card) 84'; Tristan Do (yellow card) 84'; Stefan Tsonkov (yellow card) 90+4'	Stadium: Chang Arena; Attendance: 23,555; Referee: Peerasan Krataithong

5 April 2026 27	Muangthong United	2–1	Chiangrai United	Nonthaburi
	Kakana Khamyok 72'; Willian Popp 75'; Melvyn Lorenzen (yellow card) 90+1'		Dudu Silva 12'; Victor Cardozo (yellow card) 55'; Santipap Yaemsaen (yellow card) 61'; Montree Promsawat (yellow card) 63' (yellow-red card); Carlos Iury (red card) 90+10'	Stadium: Thunderdome Stadium; Attendance: 4,140; Referee: Chaireag Ngamsom

26 April 2026 28	Chonburi	0–0	Muangthong United	Chonburi
	Jorge Fellipe (yellow card) 31'; Jefferson Tabinas (yellow card) 85'; Yotsakon Burapha (yellow card) 86'; Jonathan Bolingi (yellow card) 90+4'; Queven Inácio (yellow card) 90+5'		Kim Dong-Su (yellow card) 60'; Tristian Do (yellow card) 64'; Songwut Kraikruan (yellow card) 90+2'	Stadium: Chonburi Stadium; Attendance: 8,463; Referee: Songkran Bunmeekiart

1 May 2026 29	Muangthong United	1–1	BG Pathum United	Nonthaburi
	Kakana Khamyok 64'; Siradanai Phosri (yellow card) 72'; Michael Kempter (yellow card) 90+2'		Surachat Sareepim 21' (yellow card) 50'; Gakuto Notsuda (yellow card) 60'; Waris Choolthong (yellow card) 78'	Stadium: Thunderdome Stadium; Attendance: 11,413; Referee: Noppadet Mangngam

10 May 2026 30	Sukhothai	3–0	Muangthong United	Sukhothai
	Romeu 34', 66'; Romeu 57'; Chaiyaphon Otton (yellow card) 7'; Tassanapong Mhuaddarak (yellow card) 45+3'; Siroch Chatthong (yellow card) 74'; Kittipun Saensuk (yellow card) 90+6'		Sorawit Panthong (yellow card) 14'; Willian Popp (yellow card) 33'; Marko Šarić (yellow card) 33'	Stadium: Thalay Luang Stadium; Referee: Warintorn Sassadee

Pos	Team	Pld	W	D	L	GF	GA	GD	Pts	Qualification or relegation
12	Lamphun Warriors	30	4	17	9	35	47	−12	29	
13	Sukhothai	30	6	10	14	23	42	−19	28	
14	Muangthong United (R)	30	6	8	16	27	52	−25	26	Relegation to Thai League 2
15	Nakhon Ratchasima (R)	30	6	6	18	20	44	−24	24	Relegation to Thai League 2
16	Kanchanaburi Power (R)	30	4	11	15	29	54	−25	23	Relegation to Thai League 2

Source: Thai League 1 2025–26
Rules for classification: 1) Points; 2) Goal difference; 3) Goals scored.
(R) Relegated

=== Thai FA Cup ===
Win Draw Loss

29 October 2025 Rd 2	Muangthong United	10–0	Romklao United (T4)	Nonthaburi
	Sarayut Yoosuebchuea 7', 23', 55'; Kasidech Wettayawong 8'; Emil Roback 30'; Jaturapat Sattham 34'; Thiraphat Nuntagowat 39'; Kenan Dunnwald-Turan 40'; Payanat Thodsanid 57'; Arthit Bua-ngam 76'; Korrakot Pipatnadda (yellow card) 74'			Stadium: Thunderdome Stadium; Attendance: 892; Referee: Komgrit Ponpasit

20/21 December 2025 Rd of 32	Muangthong United	0–1	Lamphun Warriors	Nonthaburi
			Willen Mota 15'; Nont Muangngam (yellow card) 90'; Boworn Tapla (yellow card) 90+2'	Stadium: Thunderdome Stadium; Attendance: 2,472; Referee: Panumas Phansamo

=== Thai League Cup ===
Win Draw Loss

27 December 2025 Rd of 32	(T2) Bangkok	0–4	Muangthong United	Bangkok
	Yannarit Sukcharoen (yellow card) 56'; Thananat Rungrampan (yellow card) 62'		Anass Ahannach 18', 55'; Korawich Tasa 85'; Kakana Khamyok 88'; Darko Richmond (yellow card) 6'; Jaturapat Satham (yellow card) 15'	Stadium: Chalerm Phrakiat Bang Mod Stadium; Attendance: 1,642; Referee: Anusorn Nookaew

21 January 2026 Rd of 16	Muangthong United	0–2	BG Pathum United	Nonthaburi
	Melvyn Lorenzen (yellow card) 70'		Ikhsan Fandi 33', 45'	Stadium: Thunderdome Stadium; Attendance: 3,128; Referee: Chaikrit Inboonsong

== Team statistics ==
=== Appearances and goals ===
As of 10 May 26

No.	Pos.	Player	Thai League		FA Cup		League Cup		Total	
No.	Pos.	Player	Apps.	Goals	Apps.	Goals	Apps.	Goals	Apps.	Goals
1	GK	(Switzerland) Armin Gremsl	14	0	1	0	1	0	16	0
3	DF	(Thailand) Wattanakorn Sawatlakhorn	5+3	0	0	0	0	0	8	0
4	DF	(Bulgaria) Stefan Tsonkov	24+3	2	1	0	2	0	30	2
5	DF	(Nigeria) Nelson Orji	10+3	0	1	0	0	0	14	0
6	DF	(Philippines) (Germany) John-Patrick Strauß	26+1	0	1	0	1	0	29	0
7	FW	(Brazil) Willian Popp	9+1	2	0	0	0	0	10	2
8	FW	(Thailand) Korawich Tasa	17+8	1	1	0	2	1	28	2
9	FW	(Uganda) (Germany) (England) Melvyn Lorenzen	16+5	5	0	0	1	0	22	5
11	FW	(Sweden) (The Gambia) Emil Roback	8+3	2	1+1	1	0+1	0	14	3
13	MF	(Thailand) (England) James Pakorn Falconer	0+2	0	1	0	0+1	0	4	0
14	MF	(Thailand) Sorawit Panthong	21+4	2	0+1	0	2	0	28	2
15	DF	(Thailand) Jaturapat Sattham	4+7	0	1	1	1	0	13	1
16	MF	(Thailand) Wongsakorn Chaikultewin	0+2	0	0+1	0	0	0	3	0
17	MF	(Thailand) Piyanut Thodsanit	0+7	0	0+1	0	1	0	9	0
18	DF	(Thailand) Danuphon Buppha	0+3	0	0	0	0+1	0	4	0
19	DF	(Thailand) (France) Tristan Do	25+1	0	2	0	2	0	30	0
20	FW	(Thailand) Sarayut Yoosuebchur	0+1	0	1	3	0	0	2	3
21	MF	(Thailand) Purachet Thodsanit	5+8	0	1	0	1+1	0	16	0
22	MF	(Thailand) Theerapat Nanthakowat	10+9	1	1	1	0+2	0	22	2
23	DF	(Thailand) Siradanai Phosri	5+9	0	1+1	0	0	0	16	0
24	MF	(Morocco) (Netherlands) Anass Ahannach	12+11	2	1	0	1	2	25	4
27	DF	(Philippines) (Switzerland) Michael Kempter	19+1	0	0	0	0	0	20	0
28	DF	(South Korea) Kim Dong-su	13	0	0	0	1	0	14	0
29	DF	(Thailand) Songwut Kraikruan	11+8	0	2	0	1+1	0	23	0
33	GK	(Thailand) Korrakot Pipatnadda	16+1	0	0	0	1	0	18	0
34	MF	(Thailand) Kakana Khamyok	29	3	0+1	0	1+1	1	32	4
35	DF	(Thailand) Theekawin Chansri	4+1	0	0+1	0	1+1	0	8	0
36	MF	(Thailand) Piyanut Thodsanit	0	0	0	0	0	0	0	0
39	MF	(Thailand) Krittapak Seangsawat	0+5	0	0+1	0	0+1	0	7	0
45	FW	(Serbia) Marko Saric	10+3	2	0	0	1	0	14	2
48	DF	(Thailand) Donthachai Deephom	0	0	0	0	0	0	0	0
Players who have played this season and/or sign for the season but had left the club on loan to other clubs
3	DF	(Thailand) Chatchai Saengdao	0	0	0	0	0	0	0	0
10	FW	(Thailand) Poramet Arjvirai	0	0	0	0	0	0	0	0
24	MF	(Thailand) Wongsakorn Chaikultewin	0	0	0	0	0	0	0	0
26	GK	(Thailand) Kanapod Kadee	0	0	0	0	0	0	0	0
28	DF	(Thailand) Arthit Buangam	0	0	0+1	1	0	0	1	1
40	MF	(Thailand) Kasidech Wettayawong	3+6	0	1	1	0	0	10	1
67	MF	(Thailand) Nitisak Anulun	0	0	0	0	0	0	0	0
Players who have played this season and/or sign for the season but had left the club permanently
18	FW	(Germany) Kenan Dünnwald-Turan	12+1	3	2	1	0	0	15	4
31	MF	(Ghana) Richmond Darko	0	0	1	0	1	0	2	0
37	FW	(Brazil) Batata Zampier	1+1	0	0	0	0	0	2	0
