= 2024–25 Muangthong United F.C. season =

Muangthong United
2024–25 season
- Chairman: (Thailand) Wilak Lohtong
- Manager: (Italy) Gino Lettieri
- Stadium: Thunderdome Stadium, Pak Kret, Nonthaburi, Thailand
Home colours	Away colours	Third colours

The 2024–25 season is Muangthong United Football Club's 18th season since they took over from Nongchok Pittaya Nusorn Football Club in 2007. It is the club's 16th consecutive season in the top flight of the Thai football league system since being promoted in the 2009 season.

On June 23, 2024, Muangthong United announced that the club had parted ways with Miloš Joksić after the contract expired at the end of 2023-24 season. Muangthong United appointed Gino Lettieri as the new head coach on July 6, 2024. Also, he becomes the club's first ever Italian manager.

On June 25, 2024, Thai League announced the program for the upcoming 2024-25 Thai League 1 season. The season commenced on August 9, 2024, and will conclude on April 27, 2025.

On July 23, 2024, Vietnamese club Dong A Thanh Hoa announced that they would withdraw from the 2024–25 AFC Champions League Two campaign due to a hectic schedule in the upcoming 2024–25 season. Therefore, the AFC sent an official letter to the FA Thailand stating that a Thai club would replace Dong A Thanh Hoa spot. Initially, the chance went to BG Pathum United F.C. as they finished 4th in the 2023-24 Thai League 1 season. However, BG Pathum United F.C. declined the opportunity as they also have a hectic schedule. Hence, Muangthong United who finished 5th in the 2023-24 Thai League 1 season, gets the chance to compete in the group stage round of 2024–25 AFC Champions League Two instead.

== Squad ==
As of 14 August 2024

Squad No.	Name	Nationality	Date of birth (age)	Previous club
Goalkeepers
1	Kittipong Phuthawchueak	(Thailand)	26 September 1989 (age 36)	(Thailand) BG Pathum United
30	Peerapong Ruennin	(Thailand)	14 September 1995 (age 30)	(Thailand) Sukhothai F.C.
31	Kanapod Kadee	(Thailand)	26 June 2002 (age 23)	Youth team
Defenders
3	Chatchai Saengdao	(Thailand)	11 January 1997 (age 29)	Youth team
4	Hong Jeong-un	(South Korea)	29 November 1994 (age 31)	(South Korea) Daejeon Hana Citizen
5	Abbos Otakhonov	(Uzbekistan)	25 August 1995 (age 30)	(Uzbekistan) Metallurg Bekabad
19	Tristan Do (Vice-captain)	(Thailand)	31 January 1993 (age 33)	(Thailand) Bangkok United
20	John-Patrick Strauß	(Philippines) (Germany)	28 January 1996 (age 30)	(Germany) FC Hansa Rostock
22	Aly Cissokho	(France) (Senegal)	15 September 1987 (age 38)	(Thailand) Lamphun Warriors
29	Songwut Kraikruan	(Thailand)	6 November 2001 (age 24)	Youth team
39	Jaturapat Sattham	(Thailand)	15 June 1999 (age 27)	(Thailand) Port
48	Donthachai Deephom	(Thailand)	9 June 2005 (age 21)	(Thailand) Assumption United
Midfielders
8	Jacob Mahler	(Singapore)	10 April 2000 (age 26)	(Indonesia) Madura United
14	Sorawit Panthong	(Thailand)	20 February 1997 (age 29)	Youth team
21	Purachet Thodsanit	(Thailand)	9 May 2001 (age 25)	Youth team
23	Siradanai Phosri	(Thailand)	6 September 2005 (age 20)	(Thailand) Assumption United
24	Wongsakorn Chaikultewin	(Thailand)	16 September 1996 (age 29)	Youth team
33	Thiraphat Nuntagowat	(Thailand)	5 January 2005 (age 21)	(Thailand) Assumption United
34	Kakana Khamyok	(Thailand)	21 May 2004 (age 22)	(Thailand) Assumption United
36	Piyanut Thodsanit	(Thailand)	10 July 2002 (age 23)	Youth team
37	Picha Autra (captain)	(Thailand)	7 January 1996 (age 30)	(Thailand) Samut Prakan City
40	Kasidech Wettayawong	(Thailand)	21 January 1994 (age 32)	(Thailand) PT Prachuap
67	Nitisak Anulun	(Thailand)	11 February 2003 (age 23)	Youth team
Strikers
6	Teeraphol Yoryoei	(Thailand)	25 October 1994 (age 31)	(Thailand) Samut Prakan City
9	Melvyn Lorenzen	(Uganda) (Germany) (England)	26 November 1994 (age 31)	(Thailand) BG Pathum United
10	Poramet Arjvirai	(Thailand)	20 July 1998 (age 27)	Youth team
11	Emil Roback	(Sweden) (The Gambia)	3 May 2003 (age 23)	(Italy) Milan Futuro
18	Korawich Tasa	(Thailand)	7 April 2000 (age 26)	(Thailand) Ratchaburi
	Willian Popp	(Brazil)	13 April 1994 (age 32)	(China) Shanghai Port (C1)
Players loaned out / left club during season
4	Scott Woods	(Philippines) (Norway) (Scotland)	7 May 2000 (age 26)	(Norway) FK Eik Tønsberg
9	Felicio Brown Forbes	(Costa Rica) (Germany)	28 August 1991 (age 34)	(India) East Bengal
16	Jakkapan Praisuwan	(Thailand)	16 August 1994 (age 31)	(Thailand) BG Pathum United
13	Sathaporn Daengsee	(Thailand)	13 May 1988 (age 38)	(Thailand) Nongbua Pitchaya
15	Chayapol Supma	(Thailand)	6 February 1997 (age 29)	Youth team
17	Theerapat Laohabut	(Thailand)	23 February 1999 (age 27)	Youth team
23	Denis Bušnja	(Croatia)	14 April 2000 (age 26)	(Thailand) BG Pathum United
27	Ronaldo Kwateh	(Indonesia) (Liberia)	19 October 2004 (age 21)	(Turkey) Bodrum
	Ekanit Panya	(Thailand)	21 October 1999 (age 26)	(Japan) Urawa Red Diamonds

== Transfer ==
=== In ===
Pre-season transfer

Position	Player	Transferred From	Fee	Ref
DF	(Philippines) (Norway) (Scotland) Scott Woods	(Norway) Eik Tønsberg	Free	
DF	(France) (Senegal) Aly Cissokho	(Thailand) Lamphun Warriors	Free	
MF	(Thailand) Kasidech Wettayawong	(Thailand) PT Prachuap	Free	
MF	(Singapore) Jacob Mahler	(Indonesia) Madura United	Free	
FW	(Sweden) (The Gambia) Emil Roback	(Italy) Milan Futuro	Free	
DF	(Uzbekistan) Abbos Otakhonov	(Uzbekistan) PFK Metallurg Bekabad	Free	
FW	(Costa Rica) (Germany) Felicio Brown	(India) East Bengal FC	Free	
FW	(Indonesia) (Liberia) Ronaldo Kwateh	(Turkey) Bodrum	Undisclosed	
FW	(Thailand) Korawich Tasa	(Thailand) Ratchaburi	Free	
DF	(Philippines) (Germany) John-Patrick Strauß	(Germany) FC Hansa Rostock	Free	

Mid-season transfer

Position	Player	Transferred From	Fee	Ref
DF	(Thailand) Jaturapat Sattham	(Thailand) Port	Free	
DF	(South Korea) Hong Jeong-un	(South Korea) Daejeon Hana Citizen	Undisclosed	

Postseason

Position	Player	Transferred from	Fee	Ref
DF	(Philippines) (Switzerland) Michael Kempter	(Switzerland) Grasshopper	Free	

=== Loan In ===
Preseason

Position	Player	Loaned From	Fee	Ref
FW	(Croatia) Denis Bušnja	(Thailand) BG Pathum United	Season loan	(Note: Denis Bušnja's loan curtailed and contract terminated by BG at end of leg 1)
GK	(Thailand) Kittipong Phuthawchueak	(Thailand) BG Pathum United	Season loan	
DF	(Thailand) Jakkapan Praisuwan	(Thailand) BG Pathum United	Season loan	

Mid-Season

Position	Player	Loaned From	Fee	Ref
FW	(Uganda) (Germany) (England) Melvyn Lorenzen	(Thailand) BG Pathum United	Season loan till June 2025	

=== Loan Return (In) ===
Mid-Season

Position	Player	Loaned From	Fee	Ref
MF	(Thailand) Ekanit Panya	(Japan) Urawa Red Diamonds	End of loan	
FW	(Brazil) Willian Popp	(China) Shanghai Port	End of loan	

=== Out ===
Preseason

Position	Player	Transferred To	Fee	Ref
MF	(Thailand) Punnawat Chote-Jirachaithon	Unattached (Note: Later joined Suphanburi)	End of contract	
GK	(Thailand) Kawin Thamsatchanan	Retired		
DF	(Thailand) Suwit Paipromrat	Unattached (Note: Later joined Mahasarakham SBT)	End of contract	
DF	(Cameroon) Jean-Claude Billong	Unattached (Note: Later joined Lecco)	End of contract	
DF	(South Korea) Lee Jae-sung	Unattached	End of contract	
FW	(Serbia) Stefan Šćepović	Unattached (Note: Later joined PAS Giannina)	End of contract	
MF	(Thailand) Peerapong Panyanumaporn	Unattached (Note: Later joined Suphanburi)	End of contract	
MF	(Thailand) Phumin Kaewta	Unattached (Note: Later joined Suphanburi)	End of contract	
MF	(Thailand) Kannarin Thawornsak	Unattached (Note: Later joined PT Prachuap)	End of contract	
FW	(Thailand) Rittiporn Wanchuen	Unattached (Note: Later joined Chanthaburi)	End of contract	
MF	(Thailand) Jaroensak Wonggorn	(Thailand) BG Pathum United	Undisclosed	
MF	(Thailand) Sundy Wongderree	Unattached (Note: Later joined Kasem Bundit University)	End of contract	
MF	(Thailand) Thanawat Suengchitthawon	(Thailand) Ratchaburi	Contract terminated	
DF	(Thailand) Jirawat Janpong	Unattached (Note: Later joined Ayutthaya United)	End of contract	
GK	(Thailand) Natthawut Paengkrathok	Unattached (Note: Later joined Muang Trang United)	End of contract	

Mid-season

Position	Player	Transferred To	Fee	Ref
GK	(Thailand) Soponwit Rakyart	(Thailand) PT Prachuap	Free	
DF	(Philippines) (Norway) (Scotland) Scott Woods	(Cambodia) Boeung Ket Angkor	Free	
MF	(Thailand) Ekanit Panya	(Thailand) BG Pathum United	Undisclosed	
FW	(Costa Rica) (Germany) Felicio Brown	(China) Yanbian Longding	Free	

Postseason

Position	Player	Transferred To	Fee	Ref
DF	(Thailand) Picha Autra	(Thailand) Bangkok United	Free	

=== Loan return (out) ===
Mid-season

Position	Player	Loaned to	Fee	Ref
FW	(Croatia) Denis Bušnja	(Thailand) BG Pathum United	Season loan	(Note: Denis Bušnja's loan curtailed and contract terminated by BG at end of leg 1)
DF	(Thailand) Jakkapan Praisuwan	(Thailand) BG Pathum United	Season loan	(Note: Jakkapan Praisuwan's loan curtailed and contract terminated by BG at end of leg 1)

=== Loan Out ===
Preseason

Position	Player	Loaned To	Fee	Ref
DF	(Thailand) Natthawat Thobansong	(Thailand) Rayong	Season loan	(Note: Natthawat Thobansong loan curtailed before loan to Trat FC.)
GK	(Thailand) Korrakot Pipatnadda	(Thailand) Rayong	Season loan	
MF	(Thailand) Ekanit Panya	(Japan) Urawa Red Diamonds	Season loan	
FW	(Brazil) Willian Popp	(China) Shanghai Port	Season loan till 31 Dec 2024	
FW	(Thailand) Sarayut Yoosuebchuea	(Thailand) Kasetsart	Season loan	
FW	(Thailand) Jessadakorn Noysri	(Thailand) Rayong	Season loan	

Mid-Season

Position	Player	Loaned To	Fee	Ref
DF	(Thailand) Natthawat Thobansong	(Thailand) Trat	Season loan	
DF	(Thailand) Chayapol Supma	(Thailand) Kasetsart	Season loan	
DF	(Thailand) Theerapat Laohabut	(Thailand) Nakhon Pathom United	Season loan	
DF	(Thailand) Sathaporn Daengsee	(Thailand) Mahasarakham SBT	Season loan	
FW	(Indonesia) (Liberia) Ronaldo Kwateh	(Thailand) Mahasarakham SBT	Season loan	

== Friendlies ==
=== Pre-season friendly ===
Win Draw Loss

Muangthong United (Thailand)	6–0	(Thailand) Assumption United	Nonthaburi
Kakana; Teeraphol; Purachet; Piyanut; Thiraphat			Stadium: Thunderdome Stadium

20 July 2024	Muangthong United (Thailand)	4–3	(Thailand) Samut Prakan City	Nakhon Ratchasima
				Stadium: Kirin Valley Training Centre

22 July 2024	Muangthong United (Thailand)	9–1	(Thailand) Saraburi United	Nakhon Ratchasima
	Thiraphat; Teeraphol; Picha; Kasidech; Kakana; Sorawit; Roback; Piyanut			Stadium: Kirin Valley Training Centre

25 July 2024	Muangthong United (Thailand)	5–0	(Thailand) Nakhon Si United	Nakhon Ratchasima
	Chayapol; Mahler; Wongsakorn; Kakana; Bušnja			Stadium: Kirin Valley Training Centre

29 July 2024	Muangthong United (Thailand)	2–1	(Thailand) Nakhon Ratchasima Mazda	Nonthaburi
	Picha; Felicio		Lee	Stadium: Thunderdome Stadium

Muangthong United (Thailand)	1–5	(Thailand) BG Pathum United	Nonthaburi
			Stadium: Thunderdome Stadium

=== Mid-season friendlies ===
Win Draw Loss

19 August 2024	Muangthong United (Thailand)	4–0	(Thailand) Assumption United	Bangkok
	Teeraphol; Kwateh			Stadium: MWA Stadium

8 September 2024	Muangthong United (Thailand)	4–1	(Thailand) Ayutthaya United	Nonthaburi
	Bušnja; Purachet; Piyanut			Stadium: Thunderdome Stadium

== Competitions ==
=== Overview ===
Competition	First match	Last match	Starting round	Final position	Record							
Competition	First match	Last match	Starting round	Final position	Pld	W	D	L	GF	GA	GD	Win %
Thai League	11 August 2024		Matchday 1		20	10	5	5	33	20	+13	50.00
FA Cup	20 November 2024		First Round		2	2	0	0	7	0	+7	100.00
League Cup	30 October 2024	30 October 2024	First Round	First Round	1	0	0	1	0	1	−1	0.00
Champions League Two	19 September 2024		Group stage		6	3	2	1	16	10	+6	50.00
Total					29	15	7	7	56	31	+25	51.72

Last updated: 8 February 2025
Source: Competitions

Results summary

Overall								Home						Away					
Pld	W	D	L	GF	GA	GD	Pts	W	D	L	GF	GA	GD	W	D	L	GF	GA	GD
20	10	5	5	33	20	+13	35	8	2	1	21	9	+12	2	3	4	12	11	+1

=== Thai League 1 ===
11 August 2024 1	Nakhon Ratchasima Mazda	2–1	Muangthong United	Nakhon Ratchasima
	Siam 13'; Houla 54' (yellow card) 90+4'; Weerawat Jiraphaksiri (yellow card) 70'; Nattanan Biesamrit (yellow card) 90+2'		Poramet 50'; Theerapat Laohabut (yellow card) 45+2'; Picha Autra (yellow card) 58'	Stadium: 80th Birthday Stadium; Attendance: 10,021; Referee: Pawara Seejen

18 August 2024 2	Muangthong United	1–0	Lamphun Warriors	Nonthaburi
	Poramet 78' (pen.); Tristan Do (yellow card) 26'; Sathaporn Daengsee (yellow card) 84'		Kike Linares (yellow card) 33'; Victor Cardozo (yellow card) 77'	Stadium: Thunderdome Stadium; Attendance: 4,711; Referee: Veeraporn Maophaeo

23 August 2024 3	Rayong	1–1	Muangthong United	Rayong
	Islame 64'; Yodrak Namuangrak (yellow card) 45'; Hiromichi Katano (yellow card) 67'		Sathaporn 45+2'; Abbos Otakhonov (yellow card) 26'; Theerapat Laohabut (yellow card) 62'; Kakana Khamyok (yellow card) 86'	Stadium: WHA Rayong Stadium; Attendance: 7,250; Referee: Satchukorn Saenchu

28 August 2024 4	Muangthong United	2–0	Ratchaburi	Nonthaburi
	Strauß 68'; Roback 90+8'; Picha Autra (yellow card) 73'; Songwut Kraikruan (yellow card) 85'		Adisorn Promrak (yellow card) 19'; Depres (red card) 79'; Jonathan Khemdee (yellow card) 85'; Suporn Peenagatapho (yellow card) 90+2'	Stadium: Thunderdome Stadium; Attendance: 3,145; Referee: Warintron Sassadee

31 August 2024 5	Nongbua Pitchaya	0–0	Muangthong United	Nongbua Lamphu
	Jorge Felipe (yellow card) 78'; Park Jong-woo (yellow card) 85'		Korawich Tasa (yellow card) 14'; Denis Busnja (yellow card) 73'	Stadium: Pitchaya Stadium; Attendance: 4,375; Referee: Wiwat Jumpaoon

15 September 2024 6	Muangthong United	4–2	Sukhothai	Nonthaburi
	Sorawit 47' 65'; Kakana 72'; Forbes 74'		Matheus 45+2'; Siroch 90'; Sarawut Kanlayanabandit (yellow card) 17'	Stadium: Thunderdome Stadium; Attendance: 3,417; Referee: Ekkachai Phetcham

15 December 2024 (Note: Thai League rescheduled the match between Singha Chiangrai United F.C. and Muangthong United F.C. from September 21 to December 15 due to heavy flooding in Chiang Rai province.) 7 (Rescheduled)	Singha Chiangrai United	3–1	Muangthong United	Chiang Rai
	Carlos Iury 15'; Montree Promsawat 52'; Sittichok Kannoo 76'; Atikun Mheetuam (yellow card) 15'; Ralph (yellow card) 25'; Thakdanai Jaihan (yellow card) 44'; Pattara Soimalai (yellow card) 67'		Purachet Thodsanit 70'; Kakana Khamyok (yellow card) 36'; Poramet Arjvirai (yellow card) 39'; Picha Autra (yellow card) 45+1'; Kasidech Wettayawong (yellow card) 60'; Abbos Otakhonov (yellow card) 75' (yellow-red card) 90+3'	Stadium: Singha Chiangrai Stadium; Attendance: 3,644; Referee: Winat Phophat

27 September 2024 8	Muangthong United	0-0	Khonkaen United	Nonthaburi
	Poramet Arjvirai (yellow card) 90+6'		Chirawat Wangthaphan (yellow card) 24'; Brenner (yellow card) 34'; Tinnakorn Asurin (yellow card) 43'; Saksit Jitvijan (yellow card) 88'	Stadium: Thunderdome Stadium; Attendance: 2,526; Referee: Chaireag Ngamsom

22 December 2024 9 (Rescheduled)	Buriram United	1–0	Muangthong United	Buriram
	Guilherme Bissoli 68'; Theerathon Bunmathan (yellow card) 15'; Sasalak Haiprakhon (yellow card) 90+1'; Neil Etheridge (yellow card) 90+8'		Theerapat Laohabut (yellow card) 50' (yellow-red card); Sorawit Panthong (yellow card) 56'; Wongsakorn Chaikultewin (yellow card) 64'	Stadium: Chang Arena; Attendance: 21,220; Referee: Warintorn Sassadee

19 October 2024 10 (Rescheduled)	Muangthong United	1–1	BG Pathum United	Nonthaburi
	Poramet Arjvirai 50'; Kakana Khamyok (yellow card) 53'; Tristan Do (yellow card) 54'		Raniel 23'; Kritsada Kaman (yellow card) 78'; Marco Ballini (yellow card) 85'	Stadium: Thunderdome Stadium; Attendance: 8,209; Referee: Winat Phophat

27 October 2024 11 (Rescheduled)	Port	1–1	Muangthong United	Bangkok
	Felipe Amorim 1'		Felicio Brown Forbes 23' (yellow card) 45'	Stadium: PAT Stadium; Attendance: 6,250; Referee: Phairot Bunkamnoed

2 November 2024 12 (Rescheduled)	Muangthong United	0–2	PT Prachuap	Nonthaburi
	Sorawit Panthong (yellow card) 58'; Tristan Do (yellow card) 69'		Phanthamit Praphanth 17'; Jeong Woo-geun 59'; Chatmongkol Thongkiri (yellow card) 53'; Airton Tirabassi (yellow card) 55'; Barros Tardeli (yellow card) 87'	Stadium: Thunderdome Stadium; Attendance: 3,013; Referee: Warintorn Sassade

11 November 2024 13 (Rescheduled)	Muangthong United	3–1	Nakhon Pathom United	Nonthaburi
	Poramet Arjvirai 45+2'; Felicio Brown Forbes 90+17' (pen.); Emil Roback 90+20'; Sorawit Panthong (yellow card) 23'; Tristan Do (yellow card) 25'; Songwut Kraikruan (yellow card) 56'; Kittipong Phuthawchueak (yellow card) 90+7'		Valdo 90+10' (pen.)	Stadium: Thunderdome Stadium; Attendance: 2,350; Referee: Niwat Insa-ard

23 November 2024 14 (Rescheduled)	Muangthong United	2–1	True Bangkok United	Nonthaburi
	Songwut Kraikruan 19'; Felicio Brown Forbes 76'; Abbos Otakhonov (yellow card) 63'		Richairo Zivkovic 40'; Weerathep Pomphan (yellow card) 53'; Thitiphan Puangchan (yellow card) 55'	Stadium: Thunderdome Stadium; Attendance: 5,173; Referee: Thapakorn Thongkon

11 January 2025 15 (Rescheduled)	Lamphun Warriors	1–5	Muangthong United	Lamphun
	Fabio Teixeira da Silva 72'; Teerawut Churok (yellow card) 74'; Todsapol Lated (yellow card) 81'		Emil Roback 6', 37', 79'; Sorawit Panthong 22' (pen.) (yellow card) 52'; Kakana Khamyok 58'; Tristan Do (yellow card) 44'	Stadium: Lamphun Province Stadium; Attendance: 3,113; Referee: Akom Charoensuk

13 April 2025 16 (Rescheduled)	Muangthong United	2–0	Uthai Thani	Nonthaburi
	Poramet Arjvirai 17'; Kakana Khamyok 63'; Abbos Otakhonov (yellow card) 14'; Jaturapat Sattham (yellow card) 74'		Chakkit Laptrakul (yellow card) 59'; Jaturapat Sattham (yellow card) 73'	Stadium: Thunderdome Stadium; Attendance: 2,739; Referee: Natee Choosuwan

16 January 2025 17 (Rescheduled)	Muangthong United	4–0	Rayong	Nonthaburi
	Emil Roback 48', 52'; Kakana Khamyok 63'; Korawich Tasa 79'		Amani Aguinaldo (red card) 14'	Stadium: Thunderdome Stadium; Attendance: 3,044; Referee: U-sen Yala

19 January 2025 18 (Rescheduled)	Ratchaburi	1–0	Muangthong United	Ratchaburi
	Jakkaphan Kaewprom 3'; Kim Ji-min (yellow card) 35'; Suporn Peenagatapho (yellow card) 36'		Abbos Otakhonov (yellow card) 35'	Stadium: Dragon Solar Park; Attendance: 4,375; Referee: Songkran Bunmeekiart

25 January 2025 19	Muangthong United	2–1	Nongbua Pitchaya	Nonthaburi
	John-Patrick Strauß 24' (yellow card) 38'; Abbos Otakhonov 88'; Korawich Tasa (yellow card) 45+3'		Jakkrawut Songma 64'; Worawut Sathaporn (yellow card) 34'; Judivan (yellow card) 36'; Abo Eisa (yellow card) 71'	Stadium: Thunderdome Stadium; Attendance: 3,312; Referee: Warintron Sassadee

2 February 2025 20 (Rescheduled)	Sukhothai	1–3	Muangthong United	Sukhothai
	John Baggio 3'		Tristan Do 38'; Melvyn Lorenzen 45+3'; Kakana Khamyok 75'; Emil Roback (yellow card) 70'; Sorawit Panthong (yellow card) 72'	Stadium: Thalay Luang Stadium; Attendance: 3,180; Referee: Warintorn Sassadee

8 February 2025 21	Muangthong United	2–1	Singha Chiangrai United	Nonthaburi
	Teeraphol Yoryoei 90+1'; Aly Cissokho 90+5'; Abbos Otakhonov (yellow card) 59'; Hong Jeong-un (yellow card) 75'; Poramet Arjvirai (yellow card) 89'		Harhys Stewart 38'; Sittichok Kannoo (yellow card) 42'; Thakdanai Jaihan (yellow card) 60'; Jordan Emaviwe (yellow card) 82'; Santipap Yaemsaen (yellow card) 89'	Stadium: Thunderdome Stadium; Attendance: 3,522; Referee: Kotchapoom Meesridaecha

2 April 2025 22 (Rescheduled)	Khonkaen United	2–1	Muangthong United	Khon Kaen
	Lossémy Karaboué 52'; Thawin Butsombut 64' (yellow card) 65'; Worrarit Mungkhun (yellow card) 44'; Shunya Suganuma (yellow card) 53'; Phanuphong Phonsa (yellow card) 76'; Nopphon Ponkam (yellow card) 83'; Jakkit Palapon (yellow card) 90+3'		Teeraphol Yoryoei 4'; Thiraphat Nuntagowat (yellow card) 83'	Stadium: Khon Kaen Stadium; Referee: Wicharn Klinthaworn

23 February 2025 23 (Rescheduled)	Muangthong United	1–3	Buriram United	Pathum Thani
	Guilherme Bissoli 41' (o.g.); Songwut Kraikruan (yellow card) 4'; Hong Jeong-un (yellow card) 74'; Tristan Do (yellow card) 87'		Sasalak Haiprakhon 12'; Hong Jeong-un 54' (o.g.); Ratthanakorn Maikami 87'; Phitiwat Sukjitthammakul (yellow card) 28'; Dion Cools (yellow card) 78'	Stadium: BG Stadium (Note: Muangthong United played their home matches at BG Stadium, Pathum Thani, instead of their regular home stadium Thunderdome Stadium, Nonthaburi because their home stadium is not available on the day.); Attendance: 10,323; Referee: Kotchapoom Meesridaecha

1 March 2025 24 (Rescheduled)	BG Pathum United	2–0	Muangthong United	Pathum Thani
	Raniel 45', 66'; Christian Gomis (yellow card) 69'		Poramet Arjvirai (yellow card) 61'	Stadium: BG Stadium; Attendance: 10,366; Referee: Niwat Insa-ard

9 March 2025 25 (Rescheduled)	Muangthong United	1–2	Port	Nonthaburi
	Teeraphol Yoryoei 90+1' (pen.); Chatchai Saengdao (yellow card) 90+4'		Worachit Kanitsribampen 14'; Tanaboon Kesarat 72'; Lonsana Doumbouya (yellow card) 57'	Stadium: Thunderdome Stadium; Attendance: 6,718; Referee: Songkran Bunmeekiart

16 March 2025 26 (Rescheduled)	PT Prachuap	5–0	Muangthong United	Prachuap Khiri Khan
	Jeong Woo-geun 2'; Phanthamit Praphanth 9'; Andrija Filipović 24', 50'; Chrigor 90+4'		Siradanai Phosri (red card) 20'	Stadium: Sam Ao Stadium; Attendance: 3,478; Referee: Kotchapoom Meesridaecha

30 March 2025 27 (Rescheduled)	Nakhon Pathom United	2–4	Muangthong United	Nakhon Pathom
	Fergus Tierney 11'; Veljko Filipović 31'; Methas Worapanichkan (yellow card) 48'; Kittisak Phutchan (yellow card) 65'; Thitawee Aksornsri (yellow card) 84'		Abbos Otakhonov 14'; Kakana Khamyok 24' (yellow card) 76'; Poramet Arjvirai 42'; Korawich Tasa 90+6'; Sorawit Panthong (yellow card) 50'; Jaturapat Sattham (yellow card) 80'; Picha Autra (yellow card) 90+10'	Stadium: Nakhon Pathom Sport School Stadium; Attendance: 1,529; Referee: Sivakorn Pu-udom

5 April 2025 28	Bangkok United	2–1	Muangthong United	Pathum Thani
	Muhsen Al-Ghassani 6'; Luka Adžić 70' (yellow card) 14'; Thitiphan Puangchan (yellow card) 66'		Kakana Khamyok 41'	Stadium: Thammasat Stadium; Attendance: 3,031; Referee: Akom Charoensuk

20 April 2025 29 (Rescheduled)	Uthai Thani	1–1	Muangthong United	Uthai Thani
	Ben Davis 6'; John Beresford (yellow card) 9'; Charalampos Charalampous (yellow card) 41'; Jonas Schwabe (yellow card) 68'		Melvyn Lorenzen 11'; Thiraphat Nuntagowat (yellow card) 66'; Picha Autra (yellow card) 79'	Stadium: Uthai Thani Province Stadium; Attendance: 3,130; Referee: Paisan Bendem-Alee

27 April 2025 30	Muangthong United	2–0	Nakhon Ratchasima Mazda	Nonthaburi
	Poramet Arjvirai 56'; Kakana Khamyok 70'; Abbos Otakhonov (yellow card) 45'; Picha Autra (yellow card) 52'; Siradanai Phosri (yellow card) 87'		Greg Houla (yellow card) 29'; Lee Jong-Cheon (yellow card) 45+2'	Stadium: Thunderdome Stadium; Referee: Anusorn Nookaew

Pos	Team	Pld	W	D	L	GF	GA	GD	Pts	Qualification
4	Ratchaburi	30	15	7	8	65	47	+18	52	Qualification for AFC Champions League Two group stage
5	Port	30	13	9	8	52	39	+13	48	
6	Muangthong United	30	13	6	11	46	39	+7	45	
7	PT Prachuap	30	12	8	10	49	39	+10	44	
8	Lamphun Warriors	30	9	10	11	36	39	−3	37 (Note: Lamphun Warriors is ahead on the head-to-head record; Lamphun Warriors 4 pts , Uthai Thani 1 pts.)	

Source: Thai League
Rules for classification: Season in progress: 1) Points; 2) Goal difference; 3) Goals scored; End of season: 1) Points; 2) Head-to-head points; 3) Head-to-head goal difference; 4) Goals scored.

=== Thai FA Cup ===
Win Draw Loss

20 November 2024 Round of 64	Muangthong United	3–0	Sisaket United (T2)	Nonthaburi
	Felicio Brown Forbes 12', 45+4'; Kakana Khamyok 26'; Chatchai Saengdao (yellow card) 90'			Stadium: Thunderdome Stadium; Attendance: 16,279; Referee: Winat Phophat

29 January 2025 Round of 32	Nakhon Pathom United	0–4	Muangthong United	Nakhon Pathom
	Sunchai Chaolaokhwan (yellow card) 1'		Melvyn Lorenzen 26', 28', 86' (yellow card) 87'; Tristan Do 54'; Abbos Otakhonov (yellow card) 32'; Picha Autra (yellow card) 46'; Jaturapat Sattham (yellow card) 82'	Stadium: Nakhon Pathom Sport School Stadium; Attendance: 1,224; Referee: Wiwat Jumpaoon

9 April 2025 Round of 16	Bangkok United	1–2 (a.e.t.)	Muangthong United	Pathum Thani
	Rungrath Poomchantuek 104'		Thiraphat Nuntagowat 96'; Poramet Arjvirai 118'	Stadium: Thammasat Stadium; Attendance: 1,279; Referee: Sivakorn Pu-udom

23 April 2025 Quarter Final	Sukhothai	2–5	Muangthong United	Sukhothai
	Baggio Rakotonomenjanahary 30' (pen.); Hikaru Matsui 72'		Poramet Arjvirai 21', 71'; Melvyn Lorenzen 26'; Emil Roback 33' (pen.); Kakana Khamyok 39'	Stadium: Thalay Luang Stadium; Attendance: 3,109; Referee: Warintorn Sassadee

10 May 2025 Semi Final	Muangthong United	3–2	Ratchaburi	Chonburi
	Melvyn Lorenzen 5'; Poramet Arjvirai 25', 89'; Songwut Kraikruan (yellow card) 35'; Korawich Tasa (yellow card) 47'; Picha Autra (yellow card) 87'		Tana 3'; Kim Ji-min 16' (yellow card) 13'; Njiva Rakotoharimalala (yellow card) 87'	Stadium: Chonburi Stadium; Attendance: 3,819; Referee: Du Jianxin (China)

24 May 2025 Final	Muangthong United	2–3	Buriram United	Pathum Thani
	Poramet Arjvirai 45+5' (pen.), 72'		Guilherme Bissoli 27' (pen.), 51'; Goran Čaušić 35'; Kenny Dougall (yellow card) 19'; Supachai Chaided (yellow card) 40'; Phitiwat Sukjitthammakul (yellow card) 59'; Neil Etheridge (yellow card) 79'	Stadium: Thammasat Stadium; Attendance: 16,370; Referee: Wang Di (China)

=== Thai League Cup ===
Win Draw Loss

30 October 2024 Round of 32	(T3) Muang Trang United	1–0	Muangthong United	Trang
	Muhammad-Erawan Duerem 73'			Stadium: Muang Trang Stadium

=== AFC Champions League Two ===
==== Group stage ====
Pos	Team	Pld	W	D	L	GF	GA	GD	Pts	Qualification	JBH	MTU	SEL	DHC
1	(South Korea) Jeonbuk Hyundai Motors	6	4	0	2	16	4	+12	12	Advance to round of 16	—	4–1	1–0	4–0
2	(Thailand) Muangthong United	6	3	2	1	16	10	+6	11	Advance to round of 16	1–0	—	1–1	2–2
3	(Malaysia) Selangor	6	3	1	2	9	5	+4	10		2–1	1–2	—	1–0
4	(Philippines) DH Cebu	6	0	1	5	4	26	−22	1		0–6	2–9	0–4	—

Source: AFC
Rules for classification: Tiebreakers

19 September 2024 Matchday 1	Muangthong United (Thailand)	1–1	(Malaysia) Selangor	Bangkok, Thailand
	Purachet 54'; Emil Roback (yellow card) 75'	Report	Fernández 47'; Safuwan Baharudin (yellow card) 39'; Harith Haiqal (yellow card) 84'	Stadium: Rajamangala Stadium; Attendance: 1,366; Referee: Bijan Heydari (Iran)

3 October 2024 Matchday 2	Jeonbuk Hyundai Motors (South Korea)	4–1	(Thailand) Muangthong United	Jeonju, South Korea
	Moon Seon-min 51', 59'; Lee Yeong-jae 55'; Jin Tae-Ho 84'	Report	Sorawit Panthong 66'	Stadium: Jeonju World Cup Stadium; Attendance: 6,499; Referee: Hanna Hattab (Syria)

23 October 2024 Matchday 3	Muangthong United (Thailand)	2–2	(Philippines) Cebu F.C.	Bangkok, Thailand
	Forbes 53'; Roback 79'	Report	Goutier 16'; Hama 90+3'; Daniel Alemão (yellow card) 43' (yellow-red card) 90+4'	Stadium: Rajamangala Stadium; Attendance: 1,465; Referee: Ngô Duy Lân (Vietnam)

7 November 2024 Matchday 4	Cebu F.C. (Philippines)	2–9	(Thailand) Muangthong United	Manila, Philippines
	Guytho Mijland 20', 23'	Report	Forbes 7', 45+2'; Poramet Arjvirai 13', 45+6', 51'; Kakana Khamyok 37', 39'; Purachet Thodsanit 65'; Songwut Kraikruan 82'	Stadium: Rizal Memorial Stadium; Attendance: 168; Referee: Jonathan Barreiro (Australia)

28 November 2024 Matchday 5	Selangor (Malaysia)	1–2	(Thailand) Muangthong United	Petaling Jaya, Malaysia
	Cheng 5'; Nikola Jambor (yellow card) 45'	Report	Brown 53'; Poramet 76'; John-Patrick Strauß (yellow card) 45+2'; Sorawit Panthong (yellow card) 57'	Stadium: Petaling Jaya Stadium; Attendance: 7,241; Referee: Ahmad Ibrahim Yacoub (Jordan)

5 December 2024 Matchday 6	Muangthong United (Thailand)	1–0	(South Korea) Jeonbuk Hyundai Motors	Bangkok, Thailand
	Purachet Thodsanit 45+1'; Abbos Otakhonov (yellow card) 35'; John-Patrick Strauß (yellow card) 54'; Poramet Arjvirai (yellow card) 72'		Jang Nam-Ung (yellow card) 39'; Choi Chul-soon (yellow card) 72'	Stadium: Rajamangala Stadium; Referee: Jansen Foo (Singapore)

==== Knockout stage ====
13 February 2025 R16 Leg 1	Muangthong United (Thailand)	2–3	(Singapore) Lion City Sailors	Nonthaburi, Thailand
	Melvyn Lorenzen 56' (yellow card) 63'; Tristan Do 90+10'	Report	Shawal Anuar 1'; Maxime Lestienne 11' (pen.); Bart Ramselaar 27'; Song Ui-young (red card) 53'; Diogo Costa (yellow card) 90+1'; Zharfan Rohaizad (yellow card) 90+5'	Stadium: Thunderdome Stadium; Attendance: 3,865; Referee: Kim Jong-hyeok (South Korea)

20 February 2025 R16 Leg 2	Lion City Sailors (Singapore)	4–0 (7–2 agg.)	(Thailand) Muangthong United	Jalan Besar, Singapore
	Maxime Lestienne 3' (pen.); Bart Ramselaar 45+3'; Shawal Anuar 63', 88' (yellow card) 21'; Hariss Harun (yellow card) 40'	Report	Sorawit Panthong (yellow card) 24'; Tristan Do (yellow card) 50'	Stadium: Jalan Besar Stadium; Attendance: 2,749; Referee: Payam Heydari (Iran)

== Team statistics ==
=== Appearances and goals ===
As of 24 May 2025

No.	Pos.	Player	Thai League		FA Cup		League Cup		AFC Champions League Two		Total	
No.	Pos.	Player	Apps.	Goals	Apps.	Goals	Apps.	Goals	Apps.	Goals	Apps.	Goals
1	GK	(Thailand) Kittipong Phuthawchueak	18+1	0	6	0	0	0	7	0	32	0
3	DF	(Thailand) Chatchai Saengdao	3+6	0	0+3	0	1	0	0	0	13	0
4	DF	(South Korea) Hong Jeong-un	7+3	0	4+1	0	0	0	2	0	17	0
5	DF	(Uzbekistan) Abbos Otakhonov	24+2	2	5	0	0	0	5	0	36	2
6	FW	(Thailand) Teeraphol Yoryoei	1+12	3	0+3	0	1	0	0+3	0	20	3
7	FW	(Brazil) Willian Popp	0	0	0	0	0	0	0	0	0	0
8	MF	(Singapore) Jacob Mahler	0+2	0	0	0	0	0	0	0	2	0
9	FW	(Uganda) (Germany) (England) Melvyn Lorenzen	12+1	2	5	5	0	0	2	1	20	8
10	FW	(Thailand) Poramet Arjvirai	20+5	7	4	6	0	0	6+2	4	37	17
11	FW	(Sweden) Emil Roback	20+8	7	5	1	0	0	4+3	1	40	9
14	MF	(Thailand) Sorawit Panthong	14+4	3	4+1	0	0+1	0	6+1	1	31	4
18	FW	(Thailand) Korawich Tasa	9+12	2	5+1	0	1	0	2+3	0	33	2
19	DF	(Thailand) Tristan Do	22	1	2	1	0	0	8	1	33	3
20	DF	(Philippines) John-Patrick Strauß	23+3	2	4	0	0	0	6+1	0	38	2
21	MF	(Thailand) Purachet Thodsanit	4+12	0	2+2	0	0+1	0	4+4	3	28	3
22	DF	(France) Aly Cissokho	19+1	1	0	0	0	0	8	0	28	1
23	DF	(Thailand) Siradanai Phosri	2+4	0	0+1	0	0	0	0+1	0	8	0
24	MF	(Thailand) Wongsakorn Chaikultewin	1+5	0	0	0	1	0	0+1	0	8	0
29	DF	(Thailand) Songwut Kraikruan	11+11	1	4	0	0	0	3+3	1	33	2
30	GK	(Thailand) Peerapong Ruennin	5	0	0	0	0	0	0	0	5	0
31	GK	(Thailand) Kanapod Kadee	4	0	0	0	0	0	0	0	4	0
33	MF	(Thailand) Thiraphat Nuntagowat	2+3	0	0	0	0	0	0	0	5	0
34	MF	(Thailand) Kakana Khamyok	22+5	8	5+1	2	0+1	0	5+3	2	41	12
36	MF	(Thailand) Piyanut Thodsanit	1+10	0	0+3	0	1	0	0	0	14	0
37	MF	(Thailand) Picha Autra	26+1	0	6	0	0	0	7	0	41	0
39	DF	(Thailand) Jaturapat Sattham	6+5	0	1+3	0	0	0	0	0	15	0
40	MF	(Thailand) Kasidech Wettayawong	7+11	0	1	0	1	0	3+4	0	27	0
48	DF	(Thailand) Donthachai Deephom	0	0	0	0	0	0	0	0	0	0
67	MF	(Thailand) Nitisak Anulun	0	0	0	0	0	0	0	0	0	0
Players who have played this season and/or sign for the season but had left the club on loan to other clubs
Players who have played this season and/or sign for the season but had left the club permanently
4	DF	(Philippines) Scott Woods	0+1	0	0	0	1	0	0+1	0	3	0
9	FW	(Costa Rica) Felicio Brown Forbes	12+2	4	1	2	0+1	0	4+2	4	22	10
13	DF	(Thailand) Sathaporn Daengsee	7+5	1	0	0	0	0	1+3	0	17	1
15	DF	(Thailand) Chayapol Supma	0	0	1	0	1	0	0	0	2	0
16	DF	(Thailand) Jakkapan Praisuwan	7+1	0	0	0	0+1	0	3+1	0	13	0
17	DF	(Thailand) Theerapat Laohabut	2+2	0	1	0	1	0	0+1	0	7	0
23	FW	(Croatia) Denis Bušnja	6+2	0	0+1	0	0	0	1+1	0	12	0
25	GK	(Thailand) Soponwit Rakyart	2	0	0	0	1	0	1	0	4	0
27	FW	(Indonesia) Ronaldo Kwateh	0+1	0	0	0	1	0	0	0	2	0
