= 2025 Thai FA Cup final =

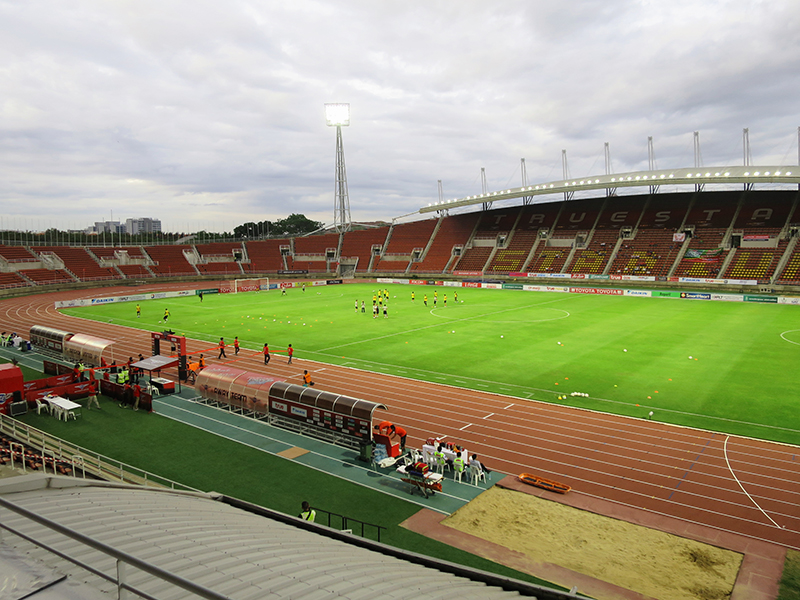
- The match took place at Thammasat Stadium.
- Event: 2024–25 Thai FA Cup
Muangthong United	Buriram United
2	3
- Date: 24 May 2025
- Venue: Thammasat Stadium, Khlong Luang, Pathum Thani
- Man of the Match: Theerathon Bunmathan (Buriram United)
- Referee: Wang Di (China)
- Attendance: 16,370
- Weather: Overcast; 28 °C (82 °F) humidity 84%

The 2025 Thai FA Cup final was the culmination of the 2024–25 Thai FA Cup, the 31st season of Thailand's premier domestic knockout football competition. The final was played on 24 May 2025 at Thammasat Stadium in Pathum Thani, Thailand. It featured a high-stakes clash between Muangthong United and Buriram United, two of the most prominent clubs in the Thai League 1. Starting from the semi-finals, the Football Association of Thailand appointed foreign referees and assistant referees to officiate the matches, including the final, as part of an effort to ensure the highest standards of fairness and professionalism in critical knockout fixtures.

Muangthong United, based in Nonthaburi, a province adjacent to Bangkok, were one of Thailand's most well-supported and historically significant clubs. Their opponents, Buriram United, hailed from the northeastern province of Buriram and had established themselves as the dominant force in Thai football over the past decade. This final marked the third meeting between the two clubs in the Thai FA Cup final, with Buriram emerging victorious in both previous encounters. For Muangthong, it was their fourth appearance in the final as they continued their pursuit of a maiden Thai FA Cup title. In contrast, Buriram United are the most successful club in Thai FA Cup history, having lifted the trophy six times from seven appearances, including their most recent triumph in the 2022–23 season.

The winner of the 2025 final qualified for the 2025–26 AFC Champions League Elite qualifying play-off.

== Route to the final ==
Muangthong United (T1)			Round	Buriram United (T1)		
Opponent	Result		Knockout 1 leg	Opponent	Result	
Sisaket United (T2)	3–0 (H)	Highlight	Round of 64	Roi Et PB United (T3)	4–0 (A)	Highlight
Nakhon Pathom United (T1)	4–0 (A)	Highlight	Round of 32	Mahasarakham SBT (T2)	5–0 (A)	Highlight
Bangkok United (T1)	2–1 (a.e.t.) (A)	Highlight	Round of 16	Chiangrai United (T1)	2–1 (a.e.t.) (H)	Highlight
Sukhothai (T1)	5–2 (A)	Highlight	Quarter-finals	Chanthaburi (T2)	1–0 (A)	Highlight
Ratchaburi (T1)	3–2 (N)	Highlight	Semi-finals	BG Pathum United (T1)	3–0 (N)	Highlight

Note: In all results above, the score of the finalist is given first (H: home; A: away; T1: Clubs from Thai League 1; T2: Clubs from Thai League 2; T3: Clubs from Thai League 3; TS: Clubs from Thailand Semi-pro League; TA: Clubs from Thailand Amateur League.

=== Muangthong United ===
Muangthong United began their campaign at home in the first round (round of 64), defeating Thai League 2 side Sisaket United with a convincing 3–0 scoreline, thanks to a brace from Felicio Brown Forbes and a goal from Kakana Khamyok. In the second round (round of 32), they traveled to face fellow top-flight side Nakhon Pathom United, where they delivered a dominant 4–0 win. Melvyn Lorenzen starred with a hat-trick, while Tristan Do added another to complete the rout. In the round of 16, Muangthong faced a stern challenge away to Bangkok United, one of the league’s title contenders. After a goalless draw in regulation time, the match went into extra time, where Muangthong edged ahead with goals from Thiraphat Nuntagowat and Poramet Arjvirai, ultimately winning 2–1. Their quarter-final saw another away fixture, this time against Sukhothai, which ended in a thrilling 5–2 victory. The goals were shared among Poramet Arjvirai (2), Melvyn Lorenzen, Emil Roback (from the penalty spot), and Kakana Khamyok. In the semi-finals held at a neutral venue, Muangthong United faced Ratchaburi, yet another Thai League 1 rival. In a closely fought encounter, Muangthong secured a 3–2 victory, with Melvyn Lorenzen and Poramet Arjvirai (2) once again proving decisive in attack, sending the club to their first Thai FA Cup final in a decade.

=== Buriram United ===
Buriram United opened their Thai FA Cup campaign on the road against Thai League 3 club Roi Et PB United, dispatching their lower-tier opponents with a commanding 4–0 win. Four different players found the net: Kenny Dougall, Guilherme Bissoli, Jefferson Tabinas, and Supachai Chaided. In the second round, they faced Mahasarakham SBT of Thai League 2 and recorded an emphatic 5–0 away victory, with Guilherme Bissoli netting a hat-trick, while Supachai Chaided and Athit Berg added a goal each. In the round of 16, Buriram hosted Chiangrai United in a tightly contested affair. The match was level 1–1 after 90 minutes, with Dion Cools scoring for Buriram. In extra time, Goran Čaušić converted a penalty to seal a 2–1 victory. The quarter-finals took them to Chanthaburi, a Thai League 2 club, where they narrowly secured a 1–0 win courtesy of a goal from Guilherme Bissoli. The semi-final pitted Buriram against another top-tier heavyweight, BG Pathum United, at a neutral venue. Displaying their pedigree, Buriram cruised to a 3–0 win, with Jefferson Tabinas, Goran Čaušić, and Supachai Chaided each getting on the scoresheet. With this result, Buriram booked their eighth appearance in the Thai FA Cup final, seeking to extend their record as the competition’s most successful club.

== Match ==
=== Details ===
24 May 2025
18:00 UTC+7

Muangthong United	2–3	Buriram United
Poramet Arjvirai 45+5' (pen.), 72'	Report; Highlight	Guilherme Bissoli 27' (pen.), 51'; Goran Čaušić 35'

Thammasat Stadium,
Khlong Luang, Pathum Thani
Attendance: 16,370
Referee: Wang Di (China)

Muangthong United	Buriram United

Lineups:
GK	1	(Thailand) Kittipong Phuthawchueak
CB	4	(South Korea) Hong Jeong-un		(substituted off) 46'
CB	5	(Uzbekistan) Abbos Otakhonov
CB	29	(Thailand) Songwut Kraikruan
RM	34	(Thailand) Kakana Khamyok		(substituted off) 78'
CM	37	(Thailand) Picha Autra (c)		(substituted off) 63'
CM	14	(Thailand) Sorawit Panthong
LM	20	(Philippines) John-Patrick Strauß
SS	11	(Sweden) Emil Roback		(substituted off) 63'
CF	10	(Thailand) Poramet Arjvirai	45+5' (pen.), 72'
CF	9	(Germany) Melvyn Lorenzen
Substitutes:
GK	31	(Thailand) Khanaphod Kadee
GK	38	(Thailand) Khomsan Sanphiphan
DF	3	(Thailand) Chatchai Saengdao
DF	39	(Thailand) Jaturapat Sattham		(substituted on) 63'
MF	6	(Thailand) Teeraphol Yoryoei		(substituted on) 78'
MF	21	(Thailand) Purachet Thodsanit		(substituted on) 63'
MF	23	(Thailand) Siradanai Phosri
MF	24	(Thailand) Wongsakorn Chaikultewin
MF	33	(Thailand) Thiraphat Nuntagowat
MF	36	(Thailand) Payanat Thodsanid
FW	18	(Thailand) Korawich Tasa		(substituted on) 46'
FW	40	(Thailand) Kasidech Wettayawong
Head Coach:
(Italy) Gino Lettieri

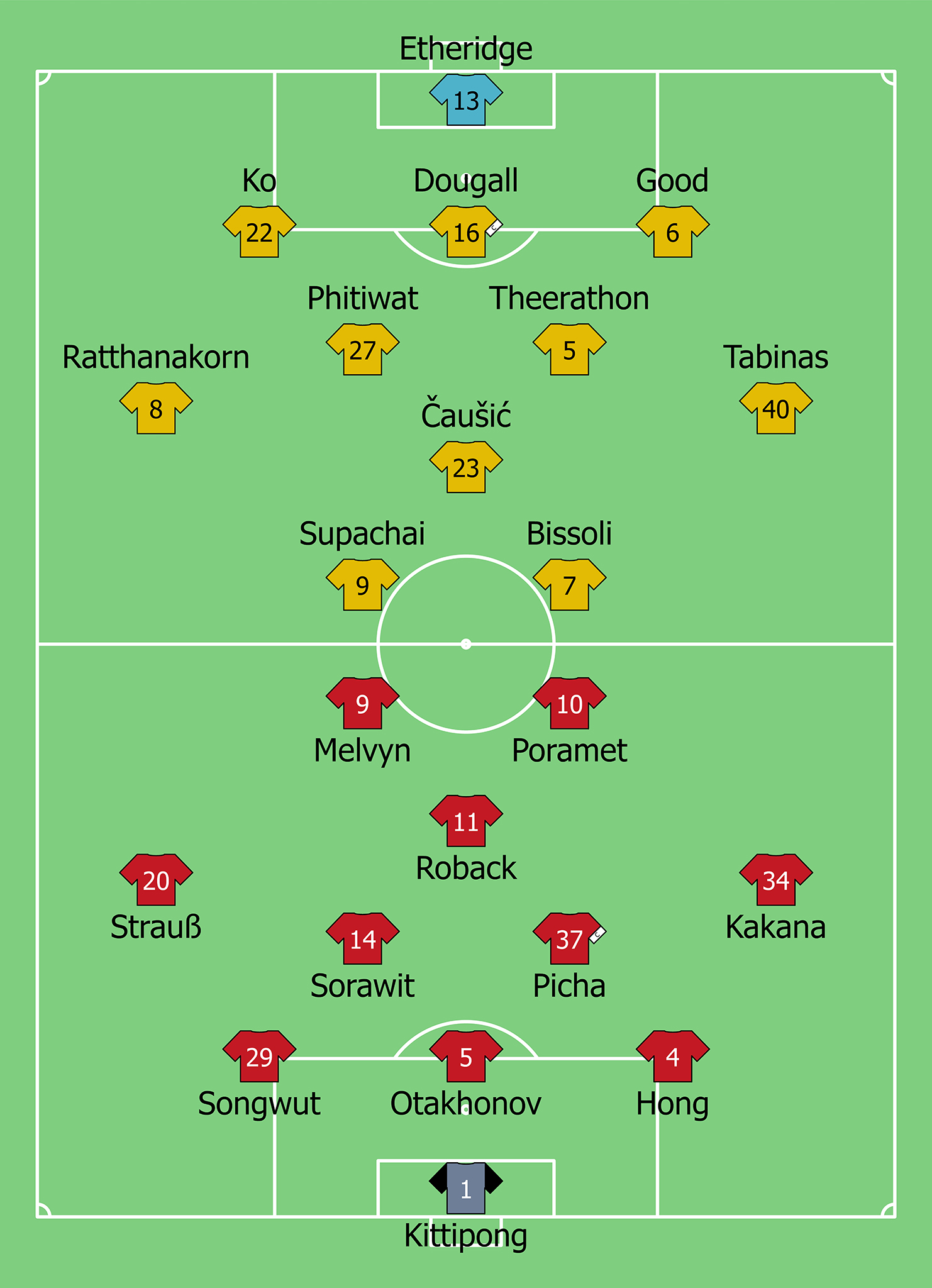

Lineups:
GK	13	(Philippines) Neil Etheridge		(yellow card) 78'
CB	22	(South Korea) Ko Myeong-seok
CB	16	(Thailand) Kenny Dougall (c)		(yellow card) 19'
CB	6	(Australia) Curtis Good			(substituted off) 65'
RM	8	(Thailand) Ratthanakorn Maikami			(substituted off) 81'
DM	27	(Thailand) Phitiwat Sukjitthammakul		(yellow card) 59'	(substituted off) 65'
DM	5	(Thailand) Theerathon Bunmathan			(substituted off) 65'
LM	40	(Philippines) Jefferson Tabinas
AM	23	(Serbia) Goran Čaušić	35'
CF	9	(Thailand) Supachai Chaided		(yellow card) 41'	(substituted off) 88'
CF	7	(Brazil) Guilherme Bissoli	27' (pen.), 51'
Substitutes:
GK	34	(Thailand) Chatchai Budprom
DF	3	(Thailand) Pansa Hemviboon			(substituted on) 88'
DF	11	(Malaysia) Dion Cools			(substituted on) 65'
DF	28	(Thailand) Maxx Creevey
MF	2	(Thailand) Sasalak Haiprakhon			(substituted on) 65'
MF	4	(Thailand) Leon James
MF	18	(Thailand) Athit Berg			(substituted on) 81'
MF	44	(Austria) Peter Žulj			(substituted on) 65'
MF	88	(Thailand) Dutsadee Buranajutanon
MF	95	(Thailand) Seksan Ratree
FW	45	(Italy) Martin Boakye
FW	54	(Thailand) Nathakorn Rattanasuwan
Head Coach:
(Brazil) Osmar Loss

Assistant referees:
(China) Ma Ji
(China) Tang Chao
Fourth official:
(Thailand) Songkran Bunmeekiart
Assistant VAR:
(Thailand) Mongkolchai Pechsri
(Thailand) Apichit Nophuan
Match Commissioner:
(Thailand) Jesdaporn Na Phatalung
Referee Assessor:
(Thailand) Somsak Semsayan
General Coordinator:
(Thailand) Nuttapon Phaopanus

MATCH RULES

- 90 minutes.
- 30 minutes extra-time if necessary.
- Penalty shoot-out if still necessary.
- Maximum of 5 substitutions.

=== Statistics ===
First half
Statistic	Muangthong United	Buriram United
Goals scored	1	2
Total shots	5	7
Shots on target	2	3
Saves	1	1
Ball possession	50%	50%
Total passes	187	178
Corner kicks	1	4
Offsides	0	1
Yellow cards	0	2
Red cards	0	0

Second half
Statistic	Muangthong United	Buriram United
Goals scored	1	1
Total shots	5	4
Shots on target	2	2
Saves	1	1
Ball possession	62%	38%
Total passes	224	148
Corner kicks	2	0
Offsides	1	0
Yellow cards	0	2
Red cards	0	0

Overall
Statistic	Muangthong United	Buriram United
Goals scored	2	3
Total shots	10	11
Shots on target	4	5
Saves	2	2
Ball possession	56%	44%
Total passes	411	326
Corner kicks	3	4
Offsides	1	1
Yellow cards	0	4
Red cards	0	0

== Winner ==
2024–25 Thai FA Cup
Winners
Buriram United
Seventh Title

=== Prizes for winner ===
- A champion trophy.
- 5,000,000 THB prize money.
- Qualification to 2025–26 AFC Champions League Elite Play-offs.

=== Prizes for runners-up ===
- 1,000,000 THB prize money.

== See also ==
- 2024–25 Thai League 1
- 2024–25 Thai League 2
- 2024–25 Thai League 3
- 2024 Thai U23 League
- 2024–25 Thai FA Cup
- 2024–25 Thai League Cup
- 2024–25 Thai League 3 Cup
