= 2024 Thai League Cup final =

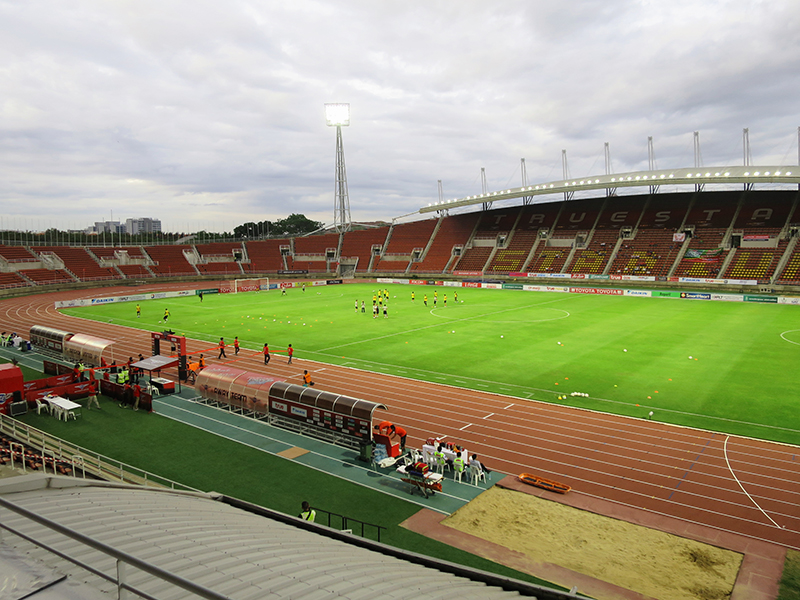
- Thammasat Stadium hosted the match.
- Event: 2023–24 Thai League Cup
BG Pathum United	Muangthong United
1	0
- Date: 16 June 2024
- Venue: Thammasat Stadium, Khlong Luang, Pathum Thani
- Man of the Match: Kritsada Kaman (BG Pathum United)
- Referee: Sivakorn Pu-udom (Thailand)
- Attendance: 15,755
- Weather: Fair; 33 °C (91 °F) humidity 55%

The 2024 Thai League Cup final was the final match of the 2023–24 Thai League Cup, the 14th season in the second era of a Thailand's football tournament organized by Football Association of Thailand. It was played at the Thammasat Stadium in Pathum Thani, Thailand on 16 June 2024, between BG Pathum United a big team from Pathum Thani that located in the Bangkok Metropolitan Region and Muangthong United a big team from Nonthaburi that located in the Bangkok Metropolitan Region of Thailand.

== Route to the final ==
BG Pathum United (T1)			Round	Muangthong United (T1)		
Opponent	Result		Knockout 1 leg	Opponent	Result	
Samut Sakhon City (T3)	4–1 (A)	Highlight	Round of 32	Lampang (T2)	4–1 (A)	Highlight
Chonburi (T1)	4–1 (A)	Highlight	Round of 16	Satun (T3)	3–1 (A)	Highlight
Ratchaburi (T1)	3–0 (A)	Highlight	Quarter-finals	Khon Kaen United (T1)	1–1 (a.e.t.) (5–4p) (A)	Highlight
Port (T1)	2–1 (N)	Highlight	Semi-finals	Buriram United (T1)	2–0 (N)	Highlight

Note: In all results below, the score of the finalist is given first (H: home; A: away; T1: Clubs from Thai League 1; T2: Clubs from Thai League 2; T3: Clubs from Thai League 3.

== Match ==
=== Details ===
16 June 2024
18:00 UTC+7

BG Pathum United	1–0	Muangthong United
Teerasil Dangda 90+8'	Report

Thammasat Stadium,
Khlong Luang, Pathum Thani
Attendance: 15,755
Referee: Sivakorn Pu-udom (Thailand)

BG Pathum United	Muangthong United

Lineups:
GK	26	(Thailand) Kittipong Phuthawchueak
RB	81	(Thailand) Waris Choolthong		(yellow card) 43'	(substituted off) 46'
CB	55	(Thailand) Chonnapat Buaphan			(substituted off) 90+3'
CB	3	(Thailand) Shinnaphat Leeaoh
LB	15	(Thailand) Apisit Sorada
CM	2	(Thailand) Kritsada Kaman
CM	4	(Thailand) Chaowat Veerachat		(yellow card) 44'	(substituted off) 46'
RM	14	(Costa Rica) Freddy Álvarez			(substituted off) 80'
AM	10	(Thailand) Teerasil Dangda	90+8'
LM	18	(Thailand) Chanathip Songkrasin (c)		(yellow card) 63'
CF	99	(Singapore) Ikhsan Fandi			(substituted off) 88'
Substitutes:
GK	49	(Thailand) Narawit Ineachaeoen
DF	5	(Brazil) Victor Cardozo
DF	16	(Thailand) Jakkapan Praisuwan			(substituted on) 90+3'
DF	23	(Thailand) Santiphap Channgom			(substituted on) 46'
MF	6	(Thailand) Sarach Yooyen			(substituted on) 46'
MF	36	(Thailand) Phitiwat Sukjitthammakul
MF	48	(Thailand) Kanokpon Buspakom
FW	19	(Thailand) Chenrop Samphaodi			(substituted on) 88'
FW	22	(Thailand) Chananan Pombuppha			(substituted on) 80'
Head Coach:
(Japan) Makoto Teguramori

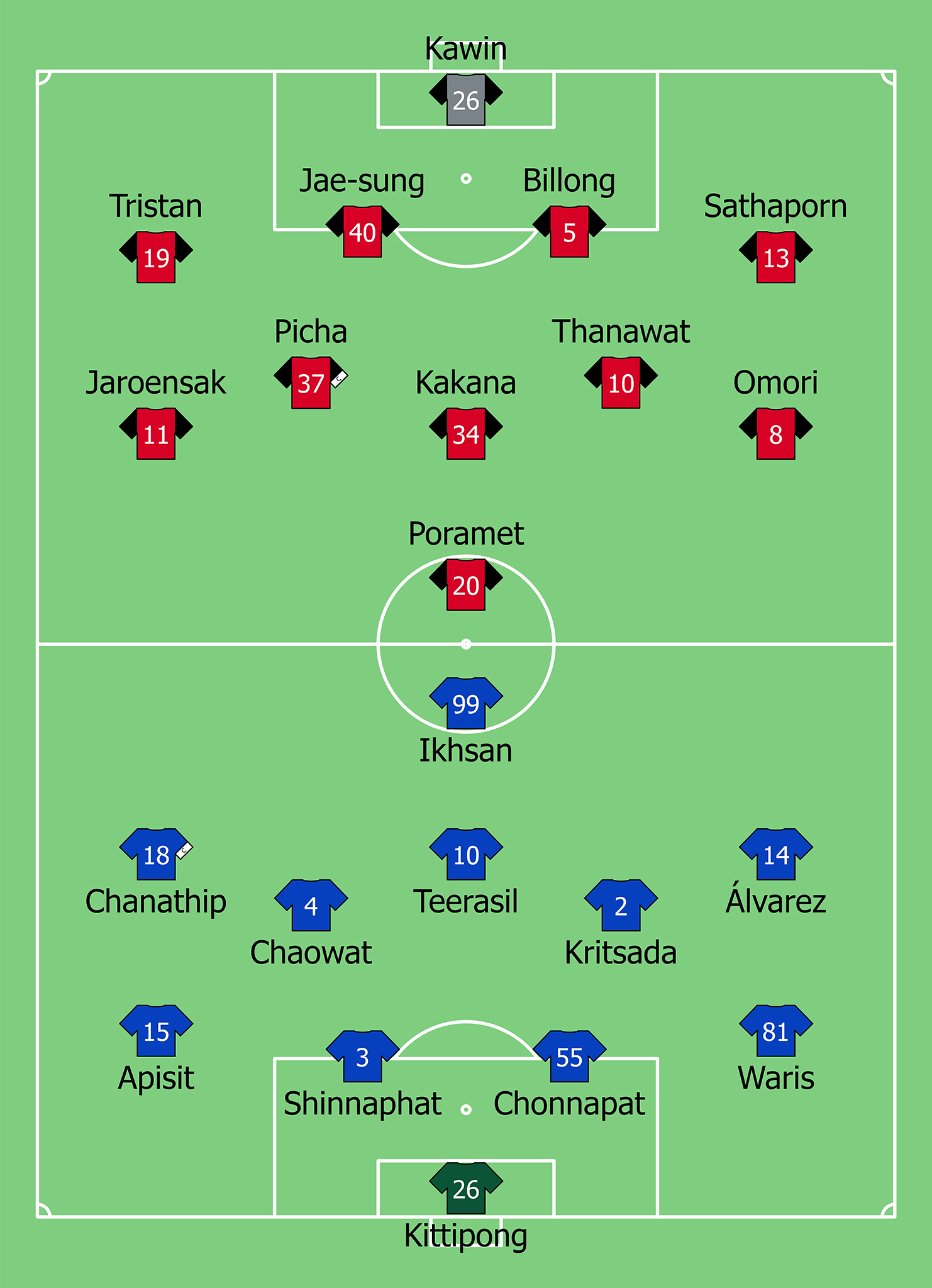

Lineups:
GK	26	(Thailand) Kawin Thamsatchanan
RB	19	(Thailand) Tristan Do
CB	40	(South Korea) Lee Jae-sung
CB	5	(France) Jean-Claude Billong	(yellow card) 87'
LB	13	(Thailand) Sathaporn Daengsee	(yellow card) 25' (yellow-red card) 57'
CM	37	(Thailand) Picha Autra (c)		(substituted off) 90+7'
CM	10	(Thailand) Thanawat Suengchitthawon	(yellow card) 48'	(substituted off) 85'
RM	11	(Thailand) Jaroensak Wonggorn
AM	34	(Thailand) Kakana Khamyok		(substituted off) 90+7'
LM	8	(Japan) Kotaro Omori		(substituted off) 59'
CF	20	(Thailand) Poramet Arjvirai
Substitutes:
GK	33	(Thailand) Korrakot Pipatnadda
DF	15	(Thailand) Chayapol Supma		(substituted on) 59'
DF	17	(Thailand) Theerapat Laohabut
DF	29	(Thailand) Songwut Kraikruan
MF	6	(Thailand) Teeraphol Yoryoei		(substituted on) 90+7'
MF	21	(Thailand) Purachet Thodsanit
MF	23	(Thailand) Kannarin Thawornsak		(substituted on) 85'
MF	24	(Thailand) Wongsakorn Chaikultewin
FW	14	(Serbia) Stefan Šćepović		(substituted on) 90+7'
Head Coach:
(Serbia) Miloš Joksić

Assistant referees:
(Thailand) Rawut Nakarit
(Thailand) Komsan Kampan
Fourth official:
(Thailand) Wiwat Jumpaoon
Assistant VAR:
(Thailand) Mongkolchai Pechsri
(Thailand) Pattarapong Kijsathit
Match Commissioner:
(Thailand) Peerapon Pu-udom
Referee Assessor:
(Thailand) Sophon Mahaboon
General Coordinator:
(Thailand) Jesada Dudnakee

MATCH RULES

- 90 minutes.
- 30 minutes extra-time if necessary.
- Penalty shoot-out if still necessary.
- Maximum of 5 substitutions.

=== Statistics ===
First half
Statistic	BG Pathum United	Muangthong United
Goals scored	0	0
Total shots	4	1
Shots on target	2	0
Saves	0	2
Ball possession	61%	39%
Total passes	259	166
Corner kicks	1	4
Offsides	0	0
Yellow cards	2	1
Red cards	0	0

Second half
Statistic	BG Pathum United	Muangthong United
Goals scored	1	0
Total shots	9	2
Shots on target	3	2
Saves	2	2
Ball possession	61%	39%
Total passes	217	139
Corner kicks	2	1
Offsides	1	0
Yellow cards	1	3
Red cards	0	1

Overall
Statistic	BG Pathum United	Muangthong United
Goals scored	1	0
Total shots	13	3
Shots on target	5	2
Saves	2	4
Ball possession	61%	39%
Total passes	476	305
Corner kicks	3	5
Offsides	1	0
Yellow cards	3	4
Red cards	0	1

== Winner ==
2023–24 Thai League Cup
Winners
BG Pathum United
First Title

=== Prizes for winner ===
- A champion trophy.
- 5,000,000 THB prize money.
- Qualification to 2025–26 ASEAN Club Championship.

=== Prizes for runners-up ===
- 1,000,000 THB prize money.
- Qualification to 2025–26 ASEAN Club Championship.

== See also ==
- 2023–24 Thai League 1
- 2023–24 Thai League 2
- 2023–24 Thai League 3
- 2023–24 Thai FA Cup
- 2023–24 Thai League Cup
- 2023–24 Thai League 3 Cup
- 2023 Thailand Champions Cup
