= Kim Dong-su (footballer) =

South Korean footballer (born 1995)

Personal information
- Full name: Kim Dong-su
- Date of birth: 21 February 1995 (age 31)
- Place of birth: Jeonju, South Korea
- Height: 1.88 m (6 ft 2 in)
- Position: Centre-back

Team information
- Current team: Muangthong United
- Number: 28

Youth career
- Hamburger SV

Senior career*
Years	Team	Apps	(Gls)
2014–2016	Hamburger SV II	46	(2)
2017–2018	Omiya Ardija	0	(0)
2019–2020	VfB Lübeck	21	(2)
2020	Anyang	9	(0)
2021–2022	Hoang Anh Gia Lai	13	(0)
2022–2023	Busan IPark	4	(0)
2023	Busan IPark II	19	(1)
2024	Seoul Nowon United	7	(0)
2025	SHB Da Nang	11	(1)
2025–	Muangthong United	14	(0)

International career
2011	South Korea U16	3	(0)
2013	South Korea U18	1	(0)
2015	South Korea U23	1	(0)
- * Club domestic league appearances and goals as of 01:59, 15 May 2026 (UTC)

Kim Dong-su (Korean: 김동수; Hanja: 金東秀; born 21 February 1995) is a South Korean footballer who plays as a centre-back for Thai League 2 club Muangthong United.

== Playing career ==
In January 2014, moved from South Korea to Hamburg to the U-19 of Hamburger SV. After five junior Bundesliga games, he made the leap to the B-team, Hamburger SV II, half a year later and was there regulars of the strong regional league team, which marched unbeaten through the first round.

Kim joined J1 League club Omiya Ardija in 2017. On 6 June 2018, he debuted against AC Nagano Parceiro in Emperor's Cup.

On 31 January 2019, Kim moved to Germany again and this time, he signed with VfB Lübeck until June 2020.
