= Armin Gremsl =

Austrian footballer

Personal information
- Date of birth: 13 August 1994 (age 32)
- Place of birth: Austria
- Height: 1.90 m (6 ft 3 in)
- Position: Goalkeeper

Youth career
- 2002–2007: FC Pinggau-Friedberg
- 2007–2012: Hartberg

Senior career*
Years	Team	Apps	(Gls)
2012–2013	Hartberg	1	(0)
2013–2015	FC Pasching	10	(0)
2015–2016	Floridsdorfer AC	14	(0)
2016–2017	Horn	11	(0)
2017–2020	Doxa Katokopias	73	(0)
2020–2021	St. Pölten	2	(0)
2021–2022	FC U Craiova	2	(0)
2022–2023	Rheindorf Altach	0	(0)
2022–2023	Rheindorf Altach Juniors	11	(0)
2023	Arminia Bielefeld	0	(0)
2023–2024	First Vienna	8	(0)
2024–2025	SKU Amstetten	29	(0)
2025–2026	Muangthong United	14	(0)
- * Club domestic league appearances and goals as of 06:57, 20 October 2025 (UTC)

Armin Gremsl (born 13 August 1994) is an Austrian footballer who plays as a goalkeeper.

== Club career ==
On 6 February 2022, Gremsl signed with Rheindorf Altach until the end of the 2021–22 season.

On 27 January 2023, Gremsl moved to Arminia Bielefeld in Germany.

On 14 August 2023, Gremsli signed a one-year contract with First Vienna.

== Career statistics ==
As of match played 2 July 2020

Club	Season	League			Cup		Continental		Other		Total	
Club	Season	Division	Apps	Goals	Apps	Goals	Apps	Goals	Apps	Goals	Apps	Goals
Floridsdorfer AC	2015–16	2. Liga	14	0	1	0	—		—		15	0
Horn	2016–17	2. Liga	11	0	0	0	—		—		11	0
Doxa Katokopias	2017–18	Cypriot First Division	28	0	2	0	—		—		30	0
Doxa Katokopias	2018–19	Cypriot First Division	31	0	1	0	—		—		32	0
Doxa Katokopias	2019–20	Cypriot First Division	14	0	2	0	—		—		16	0
Doxa Katokopias	Total		73	0	5	0	—		—		78	0
Career Total			98	0	6	0	0	0	0	0	104	0
