= Hong Jeong-un =

South Korean footballer (born 1994)

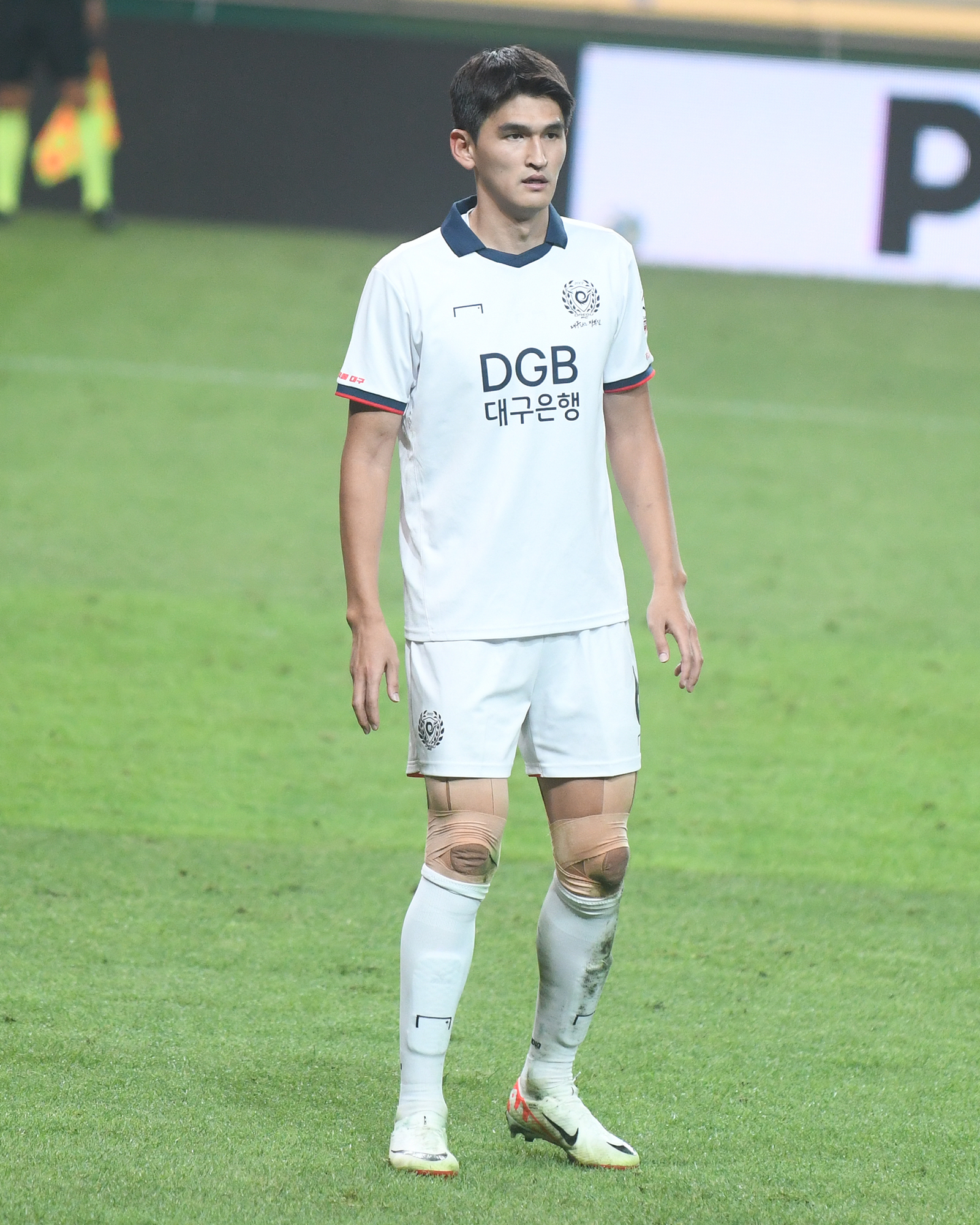

Personal information
- Full name: Hong Jeong-un
- Date of birth: 29 November 1994 (age 31)
- Place of birth: South Korea
- Height: 1.87 m (6 ft 1 1/2 in)
- Positions: Centre-back; defensive midfielder

Team information
- Current team: Paju Frontier
- Number: 20

Youth career
- Busan Jungang Middle School
- Gaeseong High School
- Busan IPark Youth

College career
Years	Team	Apps	(Gls)
- Myongji University

Senior career*
Years	Team	Apps	(Gls)
2016–2023	Daegu FC	163	(8)
2024–2025	Daejeon Hana Citizen	6	(0)
2025	→ Muangthong United (loan)	10	(0)
2025	Daegu FC	8	(0)
2026–	Paju Frontier	17	(0)

International career^{‡}
2015	South Korea U23	4	(0)
- * Club domestic league appearances and goals as of 6 August 2026 ‡ National team caps and goals as of 24 June 2025, 14:44 (UTC)

Hong Jeong-un (Korean: 홍정운; born 29 November 1994) is a South Korean footballer who plays as a centre-back and captain for K League 2 club, Paju Frontier.

== Youth career ==
Hong graduated from Busan Jungang Middle School and Gaeseong High School where he played as a winger and striker. He also played for Busan IPark's youth team. At Myongji University, Hong switched positions to play as a central defender. During Hong's third year in college in 2015, Hong was called up to South Korea's U23 national team in preparation for the 2016 Summer Olympics.

== Club career ==
=== Daegu FC ===
Hong joined K League 2 club Daegu FC as a free agent in 2015. Hong made his professional career debut in 2016 during an away match against FC Anyang when he was substituted on for Gam Han-sol in the 44th minute. Hong ended the 2016 season with 20 appearances. Following Daegu FC's promotion to K League 1, Hong played a total of 57 games from 2017 to 2019, scoring five goals and two assists. He also contributed to Daegu FC's first national cup win in 2018 where he made appearances as a starter in both rounds of the final and only allowed one goal.

On 20 January 2020, Hong was named team captain. On 29 May 2020, Hong injured his right knee during a home game against Sangju Sangmu and was subsequently diagnosed with a ruptured posterior cruciate ligament. Hong only made four appearances in the 2020 season.

During the 2021 season, Hong returned to make appearances in 24 matches. He was considered a crucial player for Daegu FC's defense as the club conceded 32 goals in 14 matches while only conceding 16 goals in the 24 matches where Hong made an appearance. In the second round of the 2021 Korean FA Cup final on 11 December 2021, Hong received a red card and was sent off after elbowing another player in the face during a corner kick. During his time at Daegu FC from 2016 to 2023, Hong played a total of 163 games.

=== Daejeon Hana Citizen ===
On 7 January 2024, Hong joined K League 1 club Daejeon Hana Citizen on a free transfer. During the 2024 season, Hong made a total of six appearances for the club.

=== Muangthong United ===
On 6 January 2025, Thai League 1 club Muangthong United announced they had signed Hong for the second leg of the 2024–25 season.

=== Return to Daegu FC ===
Hong was returned to Daegu FC for mid 2025 season.

=== Paju Frontier ===
On 24 December 2025, Hong was announcement official transfer to K League 2 promoted club, Paju Frontier from 2026 season. Hong was named captain the club for 2026 season.

== Career statistics ==
=== Club ===
As of the start from 2026 season.

Appearances and goals by club, season and competition
Club	Season	League			National cup (Note: Includes Korean FA Cup)		Continental (Note: Includes AFC Champions League Elite)		Total	
Club	Season	Division	Apps	Goals	Apps	Goals	Apps	Goals	Apps	Goals
Daegu FC	2016	K League 2	20	0	—		—		20	0
Daegu FC	2017	K League 1	6	0	—		—		6	0
Daegu FC	2018	K League 1	35	5	5	0	—		40	5
Daegu FC	2019	K League 1	16	0	1	0	6	0	23	0
Daegu FC	2020	K League 1	4	0	—		—		4	0
Daegu FC	2021	K League 1	24	1	3	0	6	0	33	1
Daegu FC	2022	K League 1	25	2	2	1	6	1	33	4
Daegu FC	2023	K League 1	33	0	1	0	—		34	0
Daegu FC	Total		163	8	12	1	18	1	193	10
Daejeon Hana Citizen	2024	K League 1	6	0	1	0	—		7	0
Muangthong United	2024–25	Thai League 1	10	0	2	0	0	0	1	0
Daegu FC	2025	K League 1	8	0	—		—		8	0
Paju Frontier	2026	K League 2	0	0	—		—		0	0
Career total			187	8	15	1	18	1	209	10

== Honours ==
Daegu FC

- Korean FA Cup: 2018
