= Sathaporn Daengsee =

Thai professional footballer

Personal information
- Full name: Sathaporn Daengsee
- Date of birth: 13 May 1988 (age 38)
- Place of birth: Buriram, Thailand
- Height: 1.80 m (5 ft 11 in)
- Position: Left back

Youth career
- 2006–2009: North Bangkok College

Senior career*
Years	Team	Apps	(Gls)
2010–2013	North Bangkok College	77	(5)
2014	Trat	23	(2)
2015	Nakhon Ratchasima	27	(0)
2016–2017	Buriram United	8	(1)
2016	→ Port (loan)	9	(0)
2017–2021	Bangkok United	14	(0)
2019–2021	→ Trat (loan)	17	(0)
2021–2024	Nongbua Pitchaya	53	(0)
2024–2025	Muangthong United	27	(1)
2025	→ Mahasarakham SBT (loan)	12	(0)

International career
2021	Thailand	3	(0)
- * Club domestic league appearances and goals as of 01:27, 10 March 2025 (UTC)

Sathaporn Daengsee (Thai: สถาพร แดงสี; born 13 May 1988) is a Thai professional footballer who plays as a left back.

== International career ==
On 12 April 2021, He was named in manager Akira Nishino’s 47-man squad for Thailand’s 2022 World Cup qualification.

== Honours ==
=== Clubs ===
Buriram United

- Kor Royal Cup: 2016
