= Emil Roback =

Swedish footballer

Personal information
- Full name: Emil Pakebba Joof Roback
- Date of birth: 3 May 2003 (age 23)
- Place of birth: Norrköping, Sweden
- Height: 1.88 m (6 ft 2 in)
- Position: Striker

Team information
- Current team: Dubočica

Youth career
- IK Sleipner
- IFK Norrköping
- 2012: Västerhaninge IF
- 2015–2019: Hammarby IF
- 2021–2022: AC Milan
- 2022: → Nordsjælland (loan)

Senior career*
Years	Team	Apps	(Gls)
2020	Hammarby IF	0	(0)
2020	→ IK Frej (loan)	7	(0)
2020–2024	AC Milan	0	(0)
2022–2023	→ Nordsjælland (loan)	0	(0)
2023	→ IFK Norrköping (loan)	3	(0)
2024–2026	Muangthong United	40	(9)
2026–	Dubočica	0	(0)

International career^{‡}
2019	Sweden U16	3	(3)
2019	Sweden U17	5	(1)
2021–2022	Sweden U19	10	(0)
- * Club domestic league appearances and goals as of 11:06, 10 September 2026 (UTC) ‡ National team caps and goals as of 23:30, 29 March 2022 (UTC)

Emil Pakebba Joof Roback (born 3 May 2003) is a Swedish professional footballer who plays as a striker. Born in Sweden to Gambian parents, Roback has represented Sweden at various youth levels internationally.

== Club career ==
=== Early career ===
Roback started playing football as a youngster with IFK Norrköping, before representing IK Sleipner and Västerhaninge IF in two brief spells.

=== Hammarby IF ===
In 2015, he joined the academy of Allsvenskan side Hammarby IF from Stockholm. On 3 January 2020, Roback signed his first professional contract with Hammarby. On 24 April 2020, Roback played striker alongside Hammarby IF shareholder Zlatan Ibrahimović in an internal friendly game with Hammarby during the COVID-19 pandemic that was televised by Dplay.

==== Loan to Frej ====
He was loaned out to affiliated club IK Frej in Ettan, Sweden's third tier, for the remainder of the 2020 season. He ended up playing 8 games for Frej in 2020.

==== Return to Hammarby IF and debut ====
On 25 June 2020, Roback returned to Hammarby for their Svenska Cupen match against IFK Göteborg. He made his professional debut after coming on as a 74th minute substitute for Imad Khalili as Hammarby would succumb to a 1–3 defeat.

=== AC Milan ===
On 14 August 2020, Roback completed a transfer to Italian Serie A club AC Milan. The transfer fee was reportedly set at around 15-20 million Swedish kronor (approximately £1.3-1.8 million). On January 13, 2022 he made his first team debut, as a substitute, playing the final minutes of a 3–1 victory against Genoa in the Coppa Italia.

==== Loan to Nordsjælland ====
On 31 August 2022 it was confirmed, that Roback had joined Danish Superliga club Nordsjælland on a season-long loan deal, with a reported purchase option of €2 million. However he only featured once with the team at the Danish Cup, and once with the reserve team, subsequently his loan was cut short before the season concluded.

==== Loan to IFK Norrköping ====
In March 2023, Roback returned to Swedish Allsvenskan club IFK Norrköping on a season-long loan deal, the club where he had spent time as a youngster.

=== Muangthong United ===
On 15 July 2024, Roback signed with Muangthong United of the Thai League 1.

== International career ==
Roback has represented his nation Sweden at the under-16, under-17 and under-19 levels.

== Career statistics ==
=== Club ===
As of match played 23 April 2025

Appearances and goals by club, season and competition
Club	Season	League			Cup (Note: Includes Svenska Cupen, Coppa Italia, Danish Cup, Thai FA Cup)		Continental		Total	
Club	Season	Division	Apps	Goals	Apps	Goals	Apps	Goals	Apps	Goals
Hammarby IF	2020	Allsvenskan	0	0	1	0	0	0	1	0
Hammarby IF	Total		0	0	1	0	0	0	1	0
IK Frej (loan)	2020	Ettan Norra	8	0	0	0	—		8	0
IK Frej (loan)	Total		8	0	0	0	—		8	0
AC Milan	2021–22	Serie A	0	0	1	0	—		1	0
AC Milan	Total		0	0	1	0	—		1	0
Nordsjælland (loan)	2022–23	Superliga	0	0	1	0	—		1	0
Nordsjælland (loan)	Total		0	0	1	0	—		1	0
IFK Norrköping (loan)	2023	Allsvenskan	3	0	0	0	—		3	0
IFK Norrköping (loan)	Total		3	0	3	0	—		3	0
Muangthong United	2024–25	Thai League 1	28	7	3	1	7 (Note: Appearance(s) in AFC Champions League Two)	1	38	9
Muangthong United	Total		28	7	3	1	7	1	38	9
Career total			39	7	9	1	7	1	55	9
