= Abbos Otakhonov =

Uzbekistani footballer

Personal information
- Full name: Abbos Adkhamjon ogli Otakhonov
- Date of birth: 25 August 1995 (age 31)
- Place of birth: Jalaquduq, Uzbekistan
- Height: 1.82 m (6 ft 0 in)
- Positions: Centre-back; right-back

Team information
- Current team: Khorazm
- Number: 5

Youth career
- 2013–2014: Pakhtakor-2

Senior career*
Years	Team	Apps	(Gls)
2015	Pakhtakor-2	2	(0)
2016	Pakhtakor	8	(0)
2017	Navbahor Namangan	15	(1)
2018–2024	Metallurg Bekabad	95	(3)
2021	→ AGMK (loan)	18	(1)
2023	→ Bukhara (loan)	15	(0)
2024–2025	Muangthong United	27	(2)
2025–	Khorazm	26	(0)

International career^{‡}
2014	Uzbekistan U19	0	(0)
2018	Uzbekistan U23	10	(2)
2018	Uzbekistan	2	(0)
Medal record
Representing Uzbekistan
Men's football
AFC U-23 Championship
Winner	China 2018	Team
- * Club domestic league appearances and goals as of 29 July 2026 ‡ National team caps and goals as of 30 July 2018

Abbos Otakhonov (Abbos Otaxonov; born 25 August 1995) is an Uzbekistani footballer who plays as a centre-back or a right-back.

== Career statistics ==
As of match played 26 June 2024

Appearances and goals by club, season and competition
Club	Season	League			Cup		League Cup		Continental		Total	
Club	Season	Division	Apps	Goals	Apps	Goals	Apps	Goals	Apps	Goals	Apps	Goals
Metallurg Bekabad	2015	Uzbek League	0	0	1	1	—		—		1	1
Metallurg Bekabad	2016	Uzbek League	8	0	2	0	—		1	0	11	0
Metallurg Bekabad	Total		8	0	3	1	—		1	0	12	1
Navbahor Namangan	2017	Uzbek League	15	1	2	0	—		—		17	1
Metallurg Bekabad	2018	Uzbekistan Super League	25	0	1	0	—		—		26	0
Metallurg Bekabad	2019	Uzbekistan Super League	25	1	0	0	1	0	—		26	1
Metallurg Bekabad	2020	Uzbekistan Super League	25	1	2	0	—		—		27	1
Metallurg Bekabad	2022	Uzbekistan Super League	12	0	3	1	—		—		15	1
Metallurg Bekabad	2024	Uzbekistan Super League	8	1	4	1	—		—		12	2
Metallurg Bekabad	Total		95	3	10	2	1	0	—		106	5
AGMK (loan)	2021	Uzbekistan Super League	18	1	2	0	—		3	0	23	1
Bukhara (loan)	2023	Uzbekistan Super League	15	0	3	0	—		—		18	0
Career total			151	5	20	3	1	0	4	0	176	8
