= Kasidech Wettayawong =

Thai footballer (born 1994)

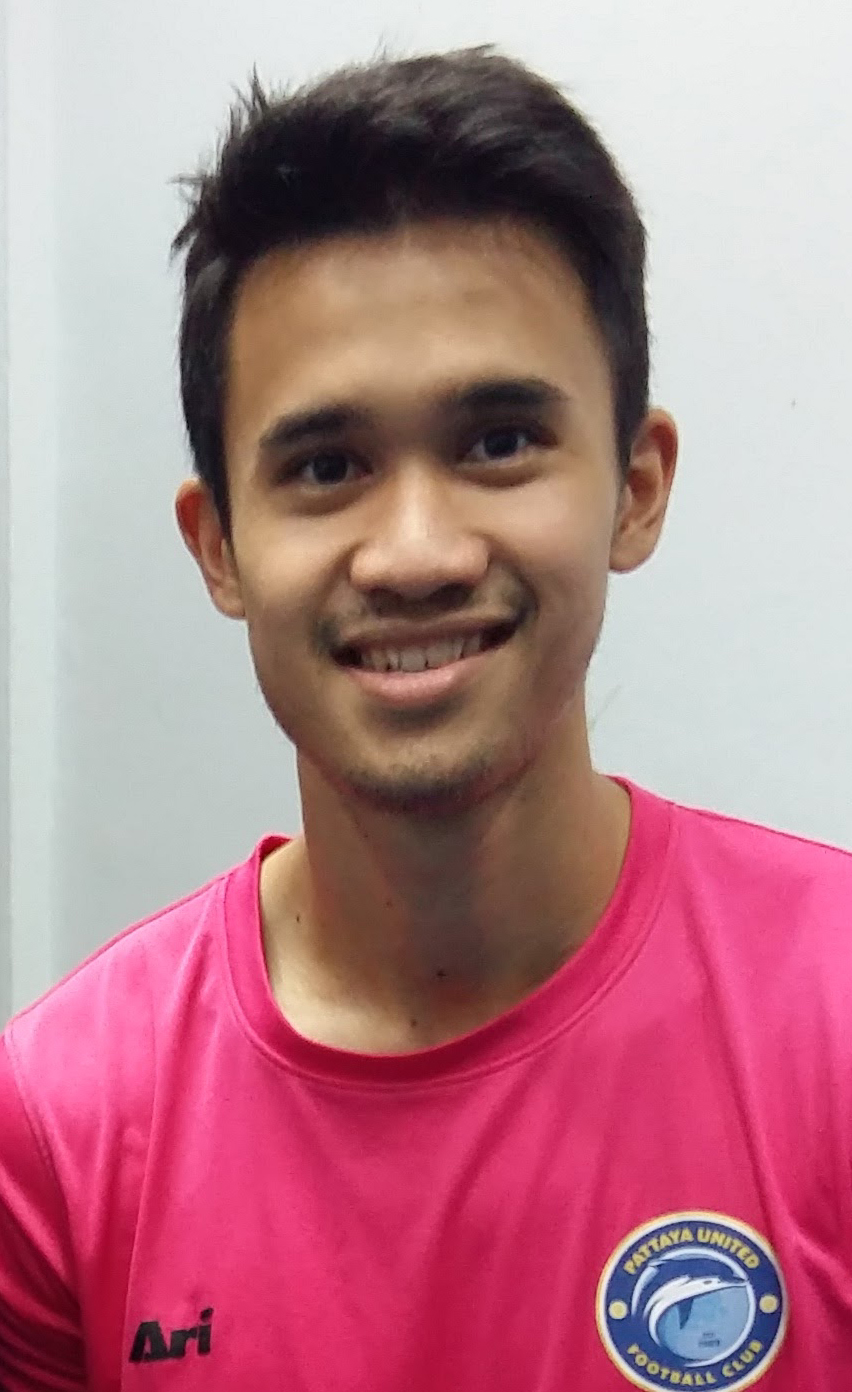

Personal information
- Full name: Kasidech Wettayawong
- Date of birth: 21 January 1994 (age 32)
- Place of birth: Bangkok, Thailand
- Height: 1.80 m (5 ft 11 in)
- Position: Midfielder

Team information
- Current team: Burapha United
- Number: 40

Youth career
- 2009–2010: Muangthong United

Senior career*
Years	Team	Apps	(Gls)
2011–2018	Muangthong United	51	(3)
2016	→ Nakhon Ratchasima (loan)	11	(0)
2017	→ BEC Tero Sasana (loan)	9	(1)
2017	→ Pattaya United (loan)	2	(0)
2018	→ Udon Thani (loan)	11	(0)
2018–2021	Suphanburi	56	(5)
2021–2024	Ratchaburi	41	(4)
2024	→ PT Prachuap (loan)	9	(1)
2024–2025	Muangthong United	27	(0)
2025–	Burapha United	1	(0)

International career^{‡}
2011	Thailand U19	6	(3)
2015–2016	Thailand U23	2	(2)
- * Club domestic league appearances and goals as of 00:26, 19 December 2025 (UTC) ‡ National team caps and goals as of 03:16, 3 February 2025 (UTC)

Kasidech Wettayawong (Thai: กษิดิ์เดช เวทยาวงศ์; born 21 January 1994), is a Thai professional footballer who plays as a winger for Thai League 3 club Burapha United.

== International career ==
In February 2015 Kasidech was called up by Kiatisuk Senamuang to play for Thailand in the 2015 King's Cup.

== Honours ==
=== Club ===
Muangthong United

- Thai League 1: 2012

=== International ===
Thailand U-19

- AFF U-19 Youth Championship: 2011
