= Theerapat Laohabut =

Thai footballer (born 1999)

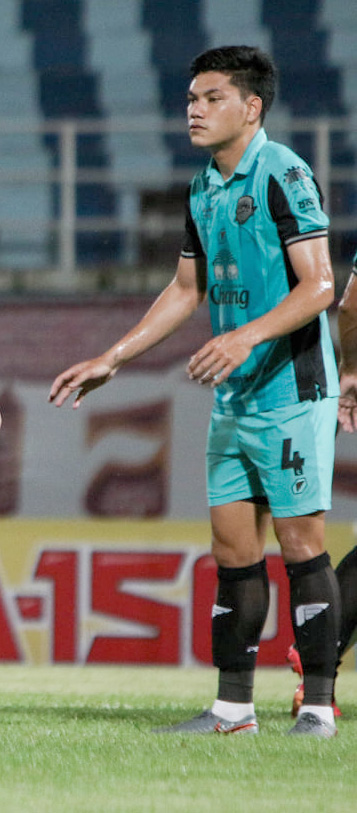
- Theerapat in 2021

Personal information
- Full name: Theerapat Laohabut
- Date of birth: 23 February 1999 (age 27)
- Place of birth: Bangkok, Thailand
- Height: 1.75 m (5 ft 9 in)
- Positions: Centre-back; left-back

Team information
- Current team: Sisaket United
- Number: 4

Youth career
- 2013–2019: Muangthong United

Senior career*
Years	Team	Apps	(Gls)
2020–2025	Muangthong United	24	(0)
2020	→ Bang Pa-in Ayutthaya (loan)	15	(0)
2021–2022	→ Ayutthaya United (loan)	29	(1)
2022–2023	→ Chainat Hornbill (loan)	30	(0)
2025	→ Nakhon Pathom United (loan)	8	(0)
2025–	Sisaket United	0	(0)

International career
2018–2019	Thailand U16	6	(0)
2020	Thailand U19	3	(0)
2021–2022	Thailand U23	4	(0)
- * Club domestic league appearances and goals as of 08:40, 20 February 2025 (UTC)

Theerapat Laohabut (Thai: ธีรภัทร เลาหบุตร, 23 February 1999) is a Thai professional footballer who plays as a centre-back or a left-back.
