= Purachet Thodsanit =

Thai footballer (born 2001)

Personal information
- Full name: Purachet Thodsanit
- Date of birth: 9 May 2001 (age 25)
- Place of birth: Bangkok, Thailand
- Height: 1.80 m (5 ft 11 in)
- Positions: Winger; attacking midfielder

Team information
- Current team: Lamphun Warriors

Youth career
- 2013–2020: Muangthong United

Senior career*
Years	Team	Apps	(Gls)
2021–2026	Muangthong United	50	(2)
2021	→ Bang Pa-in Ayutthaya (loan)	10	(2)
2026–	Lamphun Warriors	2	(0)

International career^{‡}
2019–2020	Thailand U19	4	(1)
2022–2024	Thailand U23	21	(4)
2023	Thailand	1	(0)
Medal record
Representing Thailand
Men's football
Silver medal – second place	2023 Cambodia	Team
- * Club domestic league appearances and goals as of 01:33, 2 July 2026 (UTC) ‡ National team caps and goals as of 6 September 2023

Purachet Thodsanit (Thai: ปุรเชษฐ์ ทอดสนิท, born 9 May 2001) is a Thai professional footballer who plays as a winger or an attacking midfielder.

== Personal life ==
Purachet has a brother, Piyanut Thodsanit, who is also a professional football player in the Thai League 1.

== International career ==
In October 2023, he was called up by Thailand national team for friendly match against Georgia and Estonia.

== Career statistics ==
=== Club ===
As of match played 6 April 2024

Appearances and goals by club, season and competition
Club	Season	League			Cup		League cup		Continental		Other		Total	
Club	Season	Division	Apps	Goals	Apps	Goals	Apps	Goals	Apps	Goals	Apps	Goals	Apps	Goals
Bang Pa-in Ayutthaya	2020	Thai League 1	10	2	1	0	—		—		—		11	2
Muangthong United	2021–22	Thai League 1	8	1	2	0	1	0	—		—		11	1
Muangthong United	2022–23	Thai League 1	0	0	2	0	0	0	—		—		2	0
Muangthong United	2023–24	Thai League 1	9	0	0	0	0	0	—		—		9	0
Muangthong United	Total		17	1	4	0	1	0	0	0	0	0	22	1
Career total			27	3	5	0	1	0	0	0	0	0	33	3

== Honours ==
=== International ===
Thailand U23

- SEA Games (silver) Silver medal: 2023
