= Songwut Kraikruan =

Thai footballer (born 2001)

Personal information
- Full name: Songwut Kraikruan
- Date of birth: 6 November 2001 (age 25)
- Place of birth: Kanchanaburi, Thailand
- Height: 1.88 m (6 ft 2 in)
- Position: Centre back

Team information
- Current team: Muangthong United
- Number: 6

Youth career
- 2013–2019: Suankularb Wittayalai School

Senior career*
Years	Team	Apps	(Gls)
2019–	Muangthong United	62	(1)
2020	→ Bang Pa-in Ayutthaya (loan)	13	(0)
2021	→ Kasetsart (loan)	10	(0)
2021	→ Ayutthaya United (loan)	13	(0)

International career
2023–2024	Thailand U23	7	(0)
2024–	Thailand	2	(0)
- * Club domestic league appearances and goals as of 23:42, 16 August 2025 (UTC)

Songwut Kraikruan (Thai: ทรงวุฒิ ใคร่ครวญ, 6 November 2001) is a Thai professional footballer who plays as a centre back for Thai League 1 club Muangthong United and the Thailand national team.

== International career ==
In 2024, he was called up by Thailand U23 for 2024 AFC U-23 Asian Cup in Qatar.

In October 2024 he was in the squad of Thailand for 2024 King's Cup, but did not make an appearance.

== Honours ==
=== International ===
Thailand

- King's Cup: 2024
