= Poramet Arjvirai =

Thai footballer

Personal information
- Full name: Poramet Arjvirai
- Date of birth: 20 July 1998 (age 28)
- Place of birth: Bangkok, Thailand
- Height: 1.80 m (5 ft 11 in)
- Position: Forward

Team information
- Current team: Muangthong United
- Number: 10

Youth career
- 2009–2017: Muangthong United

Senior career*
| Years | Team | Apps | (Gls) |
| 2017– | Muangthong United | 140 | (29) |
| 2017 | → Udon Thani (loan) | 1 | (0) |
| 2018 | → Bangkok (loan) | 13 | (7) |
| 2025–2026 | → Júbilo Iwata (loan) | 1 | (0) |

International career^{‡}
| 2017–2018 | Thailand U21 | 1 | (0) |
| 2018–2019 | Thailand U23 | 2 | (0) |
| 2022– | Thailand | 21 | (4) |
Medal record
Thailand
Asean Football Championship
| Winner | Mitsubishi Electric Cup 2022 | 2022 |
- * Club domestic league appearances and goals as of 01:52, 2 June 2025 (UTC) ‡ National team caps and goals as of 18 November 2025

Poramet Arjvirai (Thai: ปรเมศย์ อาจวิไล, born 20 July 1998) is a Thai professional footballer who plays as a forward for Thai League 1 club Muangthong United and the Thailand national football team.

== International career ==
In 2022, he was called up for the 2022 AFF Championship by Head Coach Alexandré Pölking.

He scored his first international goal on 13 January in the match against Vietnam.

=== International goals ===
Scores and results list Thailand's goal tally first.

| No | Date | Venue | Opponent | Score | Result | Competition |
|---|---|---|---|---|---|---|
| 1. | 13 January 2023 | Mỹ Đình National Stadium, Hanoi, Vietnam | Vietnam | 1–1 | 2–2 | 2022 AFF Championship |
| 2. | 11 June 2024 | Rajamangala National Stadium, Bangkok, Thailand | Singapore | 2–1 | 3–1 | 2026 FIFA World Cup qualification |
| 3. | 4 June 2025 | Thammasat Stadium, Pathum Thani, Thailand | India | 2–0 | 2–0 | Friendly |
| 4. | 4 September 2025 | Kanchanaburi Province Stadium, Kanchanaburi, Thailand | Fiji | 1–0 | 3–0 | 2025 King's Cup |

== Career statistics ==
=== Club ===
As of 2 June 2025

Appearances and goals by club, season and competition
| Club | Season | League | | | Nation Cup | | League Cup | | Continental | | Total | |
| Club | Season | Division | Apps | Goals | Apps | Goals | Apps | Goals | Apps | Goals | Apps | Goals |
|---|---|---|---|---|---|---|---|---|---|---|---|---|
| Muangthong United | 2018 | Thai League 1 | 13 | 1 | 0 | 0 | 0 | 0 | 0 | 0 | 13 | 1 |
| Muangthong United | 2019 | Thai League 1 | 0 | 0 | 0 | 0 | 0 | 0 | 0 | 0 | 0 | 0 |
| Muangthong United | 2020–21 | Thai League 1 | 17 | 1 | 3 | 3 | 0 | 0 | 0 | 0 | 20 | 4 |
| Muangthong United | 2021–22 | Thai League 1 | 28 | 3 | 3 | 2 | 1 | 0 | 0 | 0 | 32 | 5 |
| Muangthong United | 2022–23 | Thai League 1 | 29 | 6 | 1 | 0 | 2 | 0 | 0 | 0 | 32 | 6 |
| Muangthong United | 2023–24 | Thai League 1 | 27 | 11 | 1 | 0 | 3 | 0 | 0 | 0 | 31 | 11 |
| Muangthong United | 2024–25 | Thai League 1 | 26 | 7 | 5 | 7 | 0 | 0 | 8 | 4 | 38 | 18 |
| Muangthong United | Total | | 140 | 29 | 13 | 12 | 6 | 0 | 8 | 4 | 166 | 45 |
| Career total | | | 140 | 29 | 13 | 12 | 6 | 0 | 8 | 4 | 166 | 45 |

== Honours ==
=== International ===
Thailand

- AFF Championship (1): 2022
- King's Cup: 2024
