= Tristan Do =

Thai footballer (born 1993)

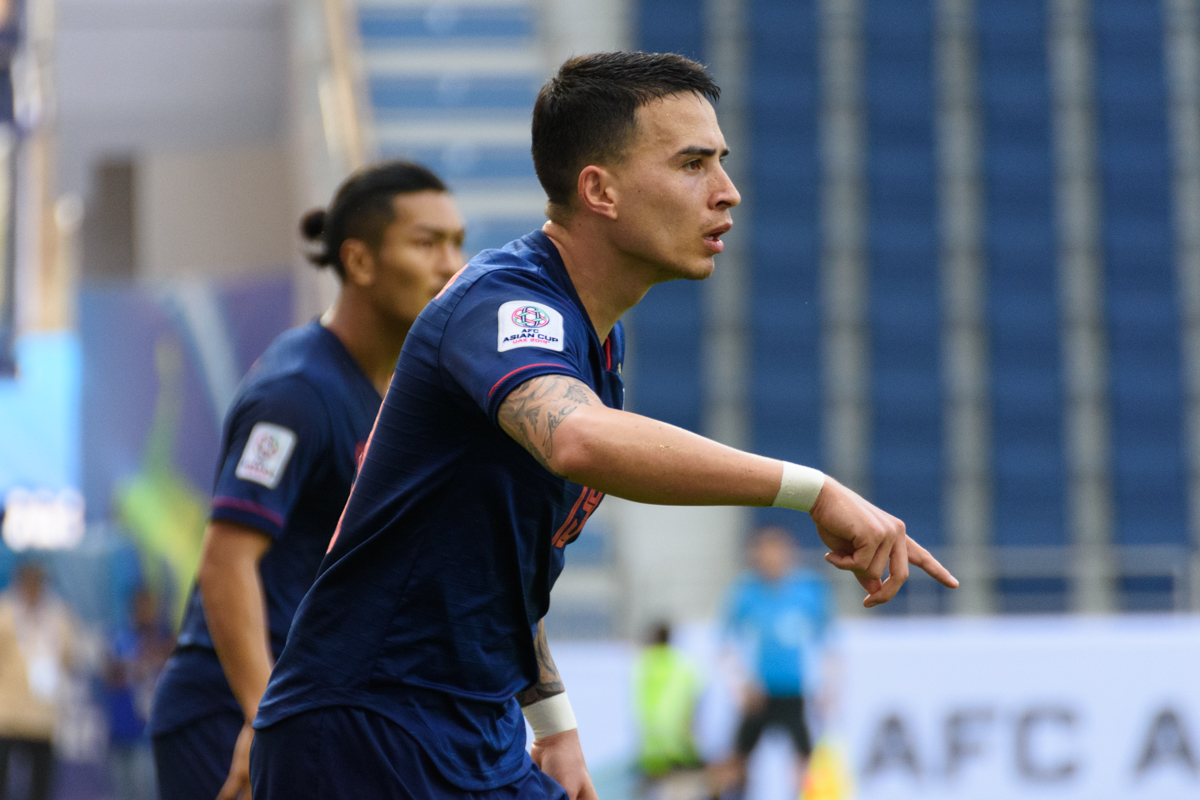
- Tristan at the 2019 AFC Asian Cup

Personal information
- Full name: Tristan Do
- Date of birth: 31 January 1993 (age 33)
- Place of birth: Paris, France
- Height: 1.71 m (5 ft 7 in)
- Position: Right-back

Team information
- Current team: Chonburi

Youth career
- 2008–2011: Strasbourg

Senior career*
Years	Team	Apps	(Gls)
2011–2013	Lorient	0	(0)
2012–2013	→ SAS Épinal (loan)	19	(2)
2013–2014	Gazélec Ajaccio	18	(4)
2014–2015	BEC Tero Sasana	35	(1)
2016–2018	Muangthong United	88	(9)
2019–2022	Bangkok United	94	(6)
2023–2026	Muangthong United	75	(3)
2026–	Chonburi	0	(0)

International career^{‡}
2015–2016	Thailand U23	8	(2)
2015–2023	Thailand	51	(0)
Medal record
Men's Football
Representing Thailand
SEA Games
Gold medal – first place	Singapore 2015	Team
Representing Thailand
AFF Championship
Winner	2016	Team
Winner	2020	Team
- * Club domestic league appearances and goals as of 01:42, 16 March 2026 (UTC) ‡ National team caps and goals as of 17 November 2023

Tristan Do (Thai: ทริสตอง โด, born 31 January 1993) is a professional footballer who plays as a right-back for Chonburi. Born in France, he plays for the Thailand national football team.

== Club career ==
Tristan trained as a youth player at the INF Clairefontaine for three years, before signing with RC Strasbourg. He played for the reserve team that won the Championnat de France Amateur 2. In June 2011, the then 18-year-old Tristan signed a three-year contract with FC Lorient. Following a loan spell at SAS Épinal, his contract with Lorient was terminated by mutual agreement. He joined the Corsica-based club Gazélec Ajaccio for the 2013–2014 season.

In mid-2014, Tristan joined BEC Tero Sasana in the Thai Premier League. As he could obtain the Thai nationality, he would not occupy a limited foreign player spot in the squad registration. BEC Tero won the 2014 Thai League Cup in Tristan's first season at the club.

He left BEC Tero for Muangthong United before the 2016 Thai League season. Muangthong United won the 2016 Thai League T1 (formerly the Thailand Premier League) and the 2016 Thai League Cup in his first season at the club.

In October 2018, Tristan was unveiled as a new player for Bangkok United ahead of the 2019 Thai League 1 season. Tristan left the club at the end of his contract in December 2022 and rejoined Muangthong United in May 2023 ahead of the 2022–23 Thai League 1 season.

In July 2026, he joined Chonburi ahead of the 2026/27 season, following Muangthong's relegation to Thai League 2 at the end of the 2025/26 season.

== International career ==
Tristan made his senior debut in the friendly match against Afghanistan in September 2015. He also played for the Thailand under-23 team at the 2015 Southeast Asian Games.

== Personal life ==
Tristan was born in Paris to a French mother and a Thai father of Vietnamese descent. He had never visited Thailand before being approached by the Thai club BBC Tero Sasana. According to Tristan, although his father speaks Thai with his relatives in France, he only spoke French while growing up and only learned Thai after moving to the Thailand.

== Career statistics ==
=== International ===
As of 17 october 2023

National team	Year	Apps	Goals
Thailand	2015	5	0
Thailand	2016	15	0
Thailand	2017	4	0
Thailand	2018	0	0
Thailand	2019	8	0
Thailand	2021	10	0
Thailand	2022	6	0
Thailand	2023	3	0
Thailand	Total	51	0

== Honours ==
=== Club ===
BEC Tero Sasana

- Thai League Cup: 2014

Muangthong United

- Thai League 1: 2016
- Thai League Cup (2): 2016, 2017
- Thailand Champions Cup: 2017
- Mekong Club Championship: 2017

=== International ===
Thailand U-23

- SEA Games Gold Medal (1): 2015

Thailand

- AFF Championship (2): 2016, 2020

=== Individual ===
- AFF Championship Best XI: 2016
- ASEAN Football Federation Best XI: 2017
