= Kakana Khamyok =

Thai footballer (born 2004)

Personal information
- Full name: Kakana Khamyok
- Date of birth: 21 May 2004 (age 22)
- Place of birth: Pathum Thani, Thailand
- Height: 1.78 m (5 ft 10 in)
- Position: Midfielder

Team information
- Current team: Bangkok United
- Number: 7

Youth career
- 2015–2021: Assumption College Thonburi

Senior career*
Years	Team	Apps	(Gls)
2021–2022	Assumption United	22	(2)
2022–2026	Muangthong United	84	(14)
2026–	Bangkok United	7	(2)

International career^{‡}
2020–2021	Thailand U19	6	(0)
2022–2026	Thailand U23	10	(2)
2024–	Thailand	13	(3)
Medal record
Men's football
Representing Thailand
FIFA ASEAN Cup
Runner-up	2026 Indonesia	Team
ASEAN Championship
Runner-up	Hyundai Cup 2026	Team
- * Club domestic league appearances and goals as of 8 November 2026 ‡ National team caps and goals as of 5 October 2026

Kakana Khamyok (Thai: คคนะ คำยก, born 21 May 2004) is a Thai professional footballer who plays as a midfielder for Thai League 1 club Bangkok United and the Thailand national team.

== International career ==
=== Youth ===
At the age of 17, Kakana was called up for the 2022 AFF U-23 Championship.

=== Senior ===
On 2 September 2024, Kakana received his first senior call-up as part of 2024 LPBank Cup to replace Supachok Sarachat, who withdrew due to an injury. On 11 October 2024, he made his senior debut by starting against Philippines in the 2024 King's Cup.

Kakana scored his first international goal with a brace during the 2026 ASEAN Championship fixtures against Laos on 25 July 2026.

== Career statistics ==
As of 31 August 2024

Appearances and goals by club, season and competition
Club	Season	League			Domestic Cup		League Cup		Continental		Other		Total	
Club	Season	Division	Apps	Goals	Apps	Goals	Apps	Goals	Apps	Goals	Apps	Goals	Apps	Goals
Muangthong United	2022–23	Thai League 1	6	0	1	0	1	0	—		—		8	0
Muangthong United	2023–24	Thai League 1	21	3	2	0	5	1	—		—		28	4
Muangthong United	2024–25	Thai League 1	28	8	0	0	0	0	0	0	—		5	0
Muangthong United	Total		55	11	3	0	6	1	0	0	—		41	4
Career total			55	11	3	0	6	1	0	0	—		41	4

=== International goals ===
Scores and results list Thailand's goal tally first.

No.	Date	Venue	Opponent	Score	Result	Competition
1.	25 July 2026	New Laos National Stadium, Vientiane, Laos	Laos	2–0	5–0	2026 ASEAN Championship
2.	25 July 2026	New Laos National Stadium, Vientiane, Laos	Laos	5–0	5–0	2026 ASEAN Championship
3.	18 August 2026	Rajamangala Stadium, Bangkok, Thailand	Singapore	1–1	1–2	2026 ASEAN Championship

== Honours ==
=== International ===
Thailand

- King's Cup: 2024, 2026
- FIFA ASEAN Cup runner-up: 2026
