= 2020–21 SCG Muangthong United F.C. season =

SCG Muangthong United
2020 season
- Chairman: Wilak Lohtong
- Manager: Alexandre Gama; Mario Gjurovski
- Stadium: SCG Stadium, Pak Kret, Nonthaburi, Thailand
Home colours	Away colours	Third colours

The 2020 season is SCG Muangthong United Football Club's 14th existence in the new era since they took over from Nongchok Pittaya Nusorn Football Club in 2007. It is the fourth season in the Thai League and the club's 12th consecutive season in the top flight of the Thai football league system since promoted in the 2009 season.

On March 1, all of Thai League 1 matches between 7 and 31 march will be played behind closed doors as broadcast only events. However, on March 4, the decision changed to postpone all of matches prior to 18 April due to the coronavirus pandemic in Thailand.

It was later confirmed that the match will restarted in September 2020 and end in May 2021.

== Squad ==
As of 24 November 2018.

Squad No.	Name	Nationality	Date of birth (age)	Previous club
Goalkeepers
29	Somporn Yos	(Thailand)	23 June 1993 (age 33)	(Thailand) PT Prachuap F.C.
38	Korrakot Pipatnadda	(Thailand)	15 July 1999 (age 27)	Youth Team
Defenders
3	Lucas Rocha	(Brazil)	19 June 1995 (age 31)	(Brazil) Atlético Clube Goianiense
4	Sarawut Kanlayanabandit	(Thailand)	27 May 1991 (age 35)	(Thailand) Port F.C.
5	Suporn Peenagatapho	(Thailand)	12 July 1995 (age 31)	(Thailand) BEC Tero F.C.
15	Saringkan Promsupa	(Thailand)	29 March 1997 (age 29)	(Thailand) Rayong F.C.
16	Patcharapol Intanee	(Thailand)	12 October 1998 (age 27)	(Thailand) Udon Thani F.C.
17	Petch Laohaserikul	(Thailand)	17 February 1998 (age 28)	Youth Team
23	Marco Ballini	(Thailand) (Italy)	12 June 1998 (age 28)	(Thailand) Chainat Hornbill F.C.
30	Wattanakorn Sawatlakhorn	(Thailand)	23 May 1998 (age 28)	(Thailand) Bangkok F.C.
31	Chatchai Saengdao	(Thailand)	11 January 1997 (age 29)	(Thailand) Udon Thani F.C.
36	Petcharat Chotipala	(Thailand)	20 December 1997 (age 28)	Youth Team
39	Boontawee Theppawong	(Thailand)	2 January 1996 (age 30)	Youth Team
66	Daisuke Sato	(Philippines)	20 September 1994 (age 32)	(Romania) Sepsi OSK Sfântu Gheorghe
	Maximilian Steinbauer	(Thailand) (Germany)	29 April 2001 (age 25)	(Germany) Tennis Borussia Berlin
Midfielders
7	Sorawit Panthong	(Thailand)	20 February 1997 (age 29)	(Thailand) Police Tero F.C.
10	Sardor Mirzaev	(Uzbekistan)	21 March 1991 (age 35)	(Uzbekistan) PFC Lokomotiv Tashkent
14	Chatmongkol Thongkiri	(Thailand)	5 May 1997 (age 29)	(Thailand) Port F.C.
18	Weerathep Pomphan	(Thailand)	27 July 1997 (age 29)	(Thailand) Chamchuri United F.C.
24	Wongsakorn Chaikultewin	(Thailand)	16 September 1996 (age 30)	(Thailand) Nakhon Ratchasima F.C.
25	Saharat Kanyaroj	(Thailand)	9 June 1994 (age 32)	(Thailand) Rayong F.C.
34	Wattana Playnum	(Thailand)	19 August 1989 (age 37)	(Thailand) Pattaya United F.C.
37	Picha Autra	(Thailand)	7 January 1996 (age 30)	(Thailand) Samut Prakan City F.C.
Strikers
8	Korrawit Tasa	(Thailand)	7 April 2000 (age 26)	(Thailand) Udon Thani F.C.
9	Sihanart Sutisuk	(Thailand)		(Thailand) Udon Thani F.C.
19	Willian Popp	(Brazil)	13 April 1994 (age 32)	(Brazil) Ceará Sporting Club
20	Poramet Arjvirai	(Thailand)	20 July 1998 (age 28)	(Thailand) Bangkok F.C.
87	Derley	(Brazil)	29 December 1987 (age 38)	(Portugal) C.D. Aves
Players loaned out / left club during season
1	Đặng Văn Lâm	(Vietnam) (Russia)	13 August 1993 (age 33)	(Vietnam) Hải Phòng F.C.
11	Phumin Kaewta	(Thailand)	12 March 1995 (age 31)	(Thailand) Samut Prakan City F.C.
4	Atikun Mheetuam	(Thailand)	18 January 1995 (age 31)	(Thailand) Bangkok F.C.
13	Sundy Wongderree	(Thailand)	27 May 1998 (age 28)	(Thailand) Udon Thani F.C.
33	Chayapol Supma	(Thailand)	6 February 1997 (age 29)	(Thailand) Assumption United F.C.
21	Sakunchai Saengthopho	(Thailand)	7 June 1999 (age 27)	(Thailand) PT Prachuap F.C.
16	Kampol Pathom-attakul	(Thailand)	27 July 1992 (age 34)	(Thailand) Samut Prakan City F.C.
5	Adisorn Promrak	(Thailand)	21 October 1993 (age 32)	(Thailand) BEC Tero F.C.
6	Sarach Yooyen	(Thailand)	30 May 1992 (age 34)	(Thailand) Nakhon Ratchasima F.C.
7	Heberty	(Brazil) (Timor-Leste)	29 August 1988 (age 38)	(Saudi Arabia) Al-Shabab FC
11	Adisak Kraisorn	(Thailand)	1 February 1991 (age 35)	(Thailand) BEC Tero F.C.
27	Jesse Curran	(Philippines) (Australia)	16 July 1996 (age 30)	(Scotland) Dundee F.C.
	Phituckchai Limraksa	(Thailand)	27 March 1997 (age 29)	(Thailand) Udon Thani F.C.
	Reungyos Janchaichit	(Thailand)	20 July 1998 (age 28)	(Thailand) Police Tero F.C.
23	Charyl Chappuis	(Thailand) (Switzerland)	12 January 1992 (age 34)	(Thailand) Suphanburi F.C.
14	Rittiporn Wanchuen	(Thailand)	30 August 1995 (age 31)	(Thailand) Army United F.C.
26	Peerapong Panyanumaporn	(Thailand)	1 June 1996 (age 30)	(Thailand) Samut Prakan City F.C.
	Suradet Klankhum	(Thailand)	2 July 1996 (age 30)	(Thailand) Bangkok F.C.

== Transfer ==
=== Pre-season transfer ===
==== In ====
Position	Player	Transferred From	Ref
DF	(Brazil) Lucas Rocha	(Brazil) Atlético Clube Goianiense	
DF	(Philippines) (Australia) Jesse Curran	(Scotland) Dundee F.C.	
MF	(Thailand) Saharat Kanyaroj	(Thailand) PTT Rayong F.C.	Free
MF	(Uzbekistan) Sardor Mirzaev	(Uzbekistan) PFC Lokomotiv Tashkent	Free
FW	(Thailand) Sakunchai Saengthopho	(Thailand) PT Prachuap F.C.	Free
FW	(Brazil) Willian Popp	(Brazil) Ceará Sporting Club	Free

Note 1: Jesse Curran moves to Udon Thani F.C. on loan after failure to obtain the Philippines passport so as to be eligible to be registered as SEA player

==== Out ====
Position	Player	Transferred To	Ref
GK	(Thailand) Prasit Padungchok	(Thailand) Police Tero F.C.	
DF	(Thailand) Suphanan Bureerat	(Thailand) Samut Prakan City F.C.	Loan Return
DF	(South Korea) Oh Ban-suk	(Saudi Arabia) Al-Wasl F.C.	Loan Return
DF	(Thailand) Isariya Marom	(Thailand) Udon Thani F.C.	Undisclosed
DF	(Thailand) Theerathon Bunmathan	(Japan) Yokohama F. Marinos	THB35m
DF	(Thailand) (Spain) Ernesto Amantegui	(Thailand) Samut Prakan City F.C.	Free
DF	(Thailand) Nukoolkit Krutyai	(Thailand) Sukhothai F.C.	Free
DF	(Thailand) Weerawut Kayem	(Thailand) PT Prachuap F.C.	
MF	(Thailand) Sanukran Thinjom	(Thailand) Chiangrai United F.C.	
MF	(Thailand) Suksan Mungpao	(Thailand) Chainat Hornbill F.C.	
MF	(Thailand) (Switzerland) Charyl Chappuis	(Thailand) Port F.C.	Undisclosed
FW	(Myanmar) Aung Thu	(Myanmar) Yadanarbon F.C.	Loan Return
FW	(Thailand) Teerasil Dangda	(Japan) Shimizu S-Pulse	THB35m

==== Loan Out ====
Position	Player	Transferred From	Ref
GK	(Thailand) Kampol Pathom-attakul	(Thailand) Rayong F.C.	Season loan
GK	(Thailand) Kittipun Saensuk	(Thailand) Chainat Hornbill F.C.	Season loan
GK	(Thailand) Ittikorn Kansrang	(Thailand) Udon Thani F.C.	Season loan
GK	(Thailand) Thirawooth Sraunson	(Thailand) Bang Pa-in Ayutthaya	Season loan
GK	(Thailand) Soponwit Rakyart	(Thailand) Bang Pa-in Ayutthaya	Season loan
GK	(Thailand) Chaloempat Ploywanrattana	(Thailand) Bang Pa-in Ayutthaya	Season loan
DF	(Thailand) Rachata Somporn	(Thailand) Bang Pa-in Ayutthaya	Season loan
DF	(Thailand) Phuwadol Chanokkawinkul	(Thailand) Bang Pa-in Ayutthaya	Season loan
DF	(Thailand) Marut Budrak	(Thailand) Bang Pa-in Ayutthaya	Season loan
DF	(Thailand) Theerapat Laohabut	(Thailand) Bang Pa-in Ayutthaya	Season loan
DF	(Thailand) Thanakorn Phramdech	(Thailand) Bang Pa-in Ayutthaya	Season loan
DF	(Thailand) Anuwat Phikulsri	(Thailand) Bang Pa-in Ayutthaya	Season loan
DF	(Thailand) Siwakorn Manjitt	(Thailand) Bang Pa-in Ayutthaya	Season loan
DF	(Philippines) (Australia) Jesse Curran	(Thailand) Udon Thani F.C.	Season loan
DF	(Thailand) Ukrit Thiamlert	(Thailand) Udon Thani F.C.	Season loan
DF	(Thailand) Kittipong Sansanit	(Thailand) Udon Thani F.C.	Season loan
DF	(Thailand) Tirapon Thanachartkul	(Thailand) Udon Thani F.C.	Season loan
DF	(Thailand) Boontawee Theppawong	(Thailand) Udon Thani F.C.	Season loan
MF	(Thailand) Naravit Kaosanthiah	(Thailand) Bang Pa-in Ayutthaya	Season loan
MF	(Thailand) Thatchapol Chai-yan	(Thailand) Bang Pa-in Ayutthaya	Season loan
MF	(Thailand) Wongsakorn Chaikultewin	(Thailand) Nakhon Ratchasima F.C.	Season loan
MF	(Thailand) Sorawit Panthong	(Thailand) Police Tero F.C.	Season loan
MF	(Thailand) Phituckchai Limraksa	(Thailand) Udon Thani F.C.	Season loan
MF	(Thailand) Reungyos Janchaichit	(Thailand) Udon Thani F.C.	Season loan
MF	(Thailand) Rittiporn Wanchuen	(Thailand) Udon Thani F.C.	Season loan
MF	(Thailand) Peerapong Panyanumaporn	(Thailand) Udon Thani F.C.	Season loan
MF	(Thailand) Suradet Klankhum	(Thailand) Udon Thani F.C.	Season loan
MF	(Thailand) Tanapat Waempracha	(Thailand) Udon Thani F.C.	Season loan
MF	(Thailand) Nonthawat Klinchampasri	(Thailand) Udon Thani F.C.	Season loan
MF	(Thailand) Manut Muangmun	(Thailand) Udon Thani F.C.	Season loan
MF	(Thailand) Arnont Pumsiri	(Thailand) Udon Thani F.C.	Season loan
MF	(Thailand) Anuwat Piankaew	(Thailand) Udon Thani F.C.	Season loan
MF	(Thailand) Thepwirun Chatkittirot	(Thailand) Udon Thani F.C.	Season loan
MF	(Thailand) Hassawat Nopnate	(Thailand) Udon Thani F.C.	Season loan
FW	(Brazil) Heberty	(Thailand) Port F.C.	Season loan
FW	(Thailand) Adisak Kraisorn	(Thailand) Port F.C.	Season loan
FW	(Thailand) Sihanart Suttisak	(Thailand) Udon Thani F.C.	Season loan

==== Return from loan ====
Position	Player	Transferred From	Ref
GK	(Thailand) Kampol Pathom-attakul	(Thailand) Samut Prakan City F.C.	Loan Return
GK	(Thailand) Taro Prasarnkarn	(Thailand) Bangkok F.C.	Loan Return
DF	(Thailand) Nukoolkit Krutyai	(Thailand) Trat F.C.	Loan Return
DF	(Thailand) Isariya Marom	(Thailand) Udon Thani F.C.	Loan Return
DF	(Thailand) Theerathon Bunmathan	(Japan) Yokohama F. Marinos	Loan Return
DF	(Thailand) Weerawut Kayem	(Thailand) PT Prachuap F.C.	Loan Return
MF	(Thailand) Suradet Klankhum	(Thailand) Bangkok F.C.	Loan Return
MF	(Thailand) Suksan Mungpao	(Thailand) Ayutthaya United F.C.	Loan Return
MF	(Thailand) Anuwat Piankaew	(Thailand) Sisaket F.C.	Loan Return
MF	(Thailand) Wongsakorn Chaikultewin	(Thailand) Trat F.C.	Loan Return
MF	(Thailand) Reungyos Janchaichit	(Thailand) Police Tero F.C.	Loan Return
FW	(Thailand) Korrawit Tasa	(Thailand) Police Tero F.C.	Loan Return

=== Mid-season transfer ===
==== In ====
Position	Player	Transferred From	Ref
MF	(Thailand) Picha Autra	(Thailand) Samut Prakan City F.C.	Undisclosed
MF	(Thailand) Phumin Kaewta	(Thailand) Samut Prakan City F.C.	Undisclosed
DF	(Thailand) (Germany) Maximilian Steinbauer	(Germany) Tennis Borussia Berlin	

==== Loan In ====
Position	Player	Transferred From	Ref
DF	(Thailand) Sarawut Kanlayanabandit	(Thailand) Port F.C.	Season loan
MF	(Thailand) Chatmongkol Thongkiri	(Thailand) Port F.C.	Season loan
DF	(Philippines) Mar Vincent Diano	(Philippines) ADT FC	Season loan
DF	(Philippines) Jarvey Gayoso	(Philippines) ADT FC	Season loan

==== Out ====
Position	Player	Transferred To	Ref
DF	(Thailand) Adisorn Promrak	(Thailand) Port F.C.	THB20m
MF	(Thailand) Sarach Yooyen	(Thailand) BG Pathum United F.C.	THB30m
GK	(Vietnam) (Russia) Đặng Văn Lâm	(Japan) Cerezo Osaka	Free

==== Return from loan ====
Position	Player	Transferred From	Ref
GK	(Thailand) Kampol Pathom-attakul	(Thailand) Rayong F.C.	Loan Return
GK	(Thailand) Thirawooth Sraunson	(Thailand) Bang Pa-in Ayutthaya	Loan return
DF	(Philippines) (Australia) Jesse Curran	(Thailand) Udon Thani F.C.	Loan Return
MF	(Thailand) Wongsakorn Chaikultewin	(Thailand) Nakhon Ratchasima F.C.	Loan Return
MF	(Thailand) Peerapong Panyanumaporn	(Thailand) Udon Thani F.C.	Loan return
MF	(Thailand) Rittiporn Wanchuen	(Thailand) Udon Thani F.C.	Loan return
FW	(Brazil) Heberty	(Thailand) Port F.C.	Loan Return

==== Loan Out ====
Position	Player	Transferred To	Ref
GK	(Thailand) Kampol Pathom-attakul	(Thailand) Ratchaburi F.C.	Season loan
GK	(Thailand) Thirawooth Sraunson	(Thailand) Kasetsart F.C.	Season loan
DF	(Thailand) Atikun Mheetuam	(Thailand) Trat F.C.	Season loan
DF	(Philippines) (Australia) Jesse Curran	(Thailand) Nakhon Ratchasima F.C.	Season loan
DF	(Thailand) Chayapol Supma	(Thailand) Suphanburi F.C.	Season loan
MF	(Thailand) Rittiporn Wanchuen	(Thailand) Suphanburi F.C.	Season loan
MF	(Thailand) Peerapong Panyanumaporn	(Thailand) Suphanburi F.C.	Season loan
MF	(Thailand) Sakunchai Saengthopho	(Thailand) Suphanburi F.C.	Season loan
MF	(Thailand) Sundy Wongderree	(Thailand) Trat F.C.	Season loan
MF	(Thailand) Phumin Kaewta	(Thailand) PT Prachuap F.C.	Season loan
FW	(Brazil) Heberty	(Thailand) Bangkok United	Season loan

== Friendlies ==
=== Pre-Season Friendly ===
Win Draw Loss

16 January 2020 1	Uthai Thani F.C. (Thailand)	0-2	(Thailand) Muangthong United	Rachakram, Thailand
				Stadium: Rachakram Stadium

Leo Cup 2020 Thailand – 22 to 30 January

22 January 2020 Leo Cup R16	Muangthong United (Thailand)	1-0	(Thailand) Nongbua Pitchaya F.C.	Nonthaburi province
	Lucas Rocha 85'	Report		Stadium: SCG Stadium

25 January 2020 Leo Cup QF	Muangthong United (Thailand)	2-1	(Singapore) Tampines Rovers	Nonthaburi province
	Derley 57' 89'		Boris Kopitović 18'	Stadium: SCG Stadium

30 January 2020 Leo Cup SF	Muangthong United (Thailand)	0-0 (4-3 p)	(Thailand) PT Prachuap F.C.	Pathum Thani province
				Stadium: Leo Stadium

2 February 2020 Leo Cup Final	Muangthong United (Thailand)	1-2	(Thailand) Port F.C.	Pathum Thani province
	Derley 18'		Go Seul-ki 82'; Adisak Kraisorn 90+1'	Stadium: Leo Stadium

=== In-Season Friendly ===
Win Draw Loss

8 March 2020 1	Muangthong United (Thailand)	6-0	(Thailand) Udon Thani F.C.	Nonthaburi province
	Sundy Wongderree; Sarach Yooyen; Chatchai Saengdao; Saringkan Promsupa; Poramet Arjvirai			Stadium: SCG Stadium

15 March 2020 2	Muangthong United (Thailand)	3-0	(Thailand) Kasetsart F.C.	Nonthaburi province
	Sundy Wongderree; Petch Laohaserikul			Stadium: SCG Stadium

=== Mid-Season Friendly ===
1	Muangthong United (Thailand)	2-1	(Thailand) Uthai Thani F.C.	Nonthaburi province
				Stadium: SCG Stadium

2 August 2020 2	Muangthong United (Thailand)	6-1	(Thailand) Ayutthaya F.C.	Nonthaburi province
	Sardor Mirzaev			Stadium: SCG Stadium

11 August 2020 3	Muangthong United (Thailand)	4-0	(Thailand) Kasetsart F.C.	Nonthaburi province
				Stadium: SCG Stadium

14 August 2020 4	Muangthong United (Thailand)	v	(Thailand) Kasem Bundit University F.C.	Nonthaburi province
				Stadium: SCG Stadium

21 August 2020 5	Muangthong United (Thailand)	4-0	(Thailand) Nakhon Pathom United F.C.	Nonthaburi province
				Stadium: SCG Stadium

30 August 2020 6	Nakhon Ratchasima F.C. (Thailand)	1-0	(Thailand) Muangthong United	Nakhon Ratchasima province
	Leandro Assumpção			Stadium: Swatcat Training Center

6 September 2020 7	Muangthong United (Thailand)	2-2	(Thailand) Chonburi F.C.	Nonthaburi province
	Derley 47'; Willian Popp 52'		9'; Dragan Bošković 39'	Stadium: SCG Stadium

=== Mid-Season Break Friendly ===
15 January 2021 1	Muangthong United (Thailand)	3-1	(Thailand) Ayutthaya F.C.	Nonthaburi province
				Stadium: SCG Stadium

== Competitions ==
=== Thai League 1 ===
Win Draw Loss s

15 February 2020 1	BG Pathum United (Thailand)	2–1	(Thailand) SCG Muangthong United	Pathum Thani province
	Victor Cardozo 58' (pen.); Thitiphan Puangjan 69'; Suwannapat Kingkaew (yellow card) 37'; Irfan Fandi (red card) 44'		Derley 38' (pen.); Sarach Yooyen (yellow card) 26' (yellow-red card) 64'; Wattanakorn Sawatlakhorn (yellow card) 34'	Stadium: Leo Stadium; Attendance: 9.828; Referee: Niwat Insaard

23 February 2020 2	SCG Muangthong United (Thailand)	1–2	(Thailand) True Bangkok United	Nonthaburi province
	Everton 60' (o.g.); Wattana Playnum (yellow card) 33'; Petcharat Chotipala (yellow card) 73'; Sarach Yooyen (yellow card) 90'		Anon Amornlerdsak 29' (yellow card) 51'; Thossawat Limwannasathian 74'; Vander Luiz (yellow card) 81'; Hajime Hosogai (yellow card) 90'	Stadium: SCG Stadium; Attendance: 9,214; Referee: Mongkolchai Pechsri

26 February 2020 3	Rayong (Thailand)	0–3	(Thailand) SCG Muangthong United	Rayong province
			Saharat Kanyaroj 52' (yellow card) 82'; Derley 84'; Sundy Wongderree 90'; Petcharat Chotipala (yellow card) 84'	Stadium: Rayong Stadium; Attendance: 4,560; Referee: Phairot Bunkamnoed

1 March 2020 4	SCG Muangthong United (Thailand)	1–0	(Thailand) Chonburi	Nonthaburi province
	Derley 19' (yellow card) 71'; Wattanakorn Sawatlakhorn (yellow card) 25'; Weerathep Pomphan (yellow card) 38'; Sardor Mirzaev (yellow card) 71'; Suporn Peenagatapho (yellow card) 79'		Carli de Murga (yellow card) 1'; Júnior Lopes (yellow card) 90'	Stadium: SCG Stadium; Attendance: 7,642; Referee: Teetichai Nualjan

12 September 2020 5 (Note: The Thai League matches originally scheduled in March are postponed following the coronavirus outbreak.)	Sukhothai (Thailand)	1–0	(Thailand) SCG Muangthong United	Sukhothai province
	Ibson Melo 81'; Woranat Thongkruea (yellow card) 24'	Report	Patcharapol Intanee (yellow card) 15'	Stadium: Thalay Luang Stadium; Attendance: 2,000; Referee: Mongkolchai Pechsri

20 September 2020 6	SCG Muangthong United (Thailand)	0–0	(Thailand) Samut Prakan City	Nonthaburi province
	Picha Autra (yellow card) 30'; Daisuke Sato (yellow card) 38'; Sorawit Panthong (yellow card) 74'		Saksit Jitvijan (yellow card) 46'; Peeradon Chamratsamee (yellow card) 66'; Nopphon Ponkam (yellow card) 90+1'	Stadium: SCG Stadium; Attendance: 2,956; Referee: Panumas Phansamo

26 September 2020 7	SCG Muangthong United (Thailand)	2–1	(Thailand) Ratchaburi Mitr Phol	Nonthaburi province
	Derley 24' (yellow card) 77'; Suporn Peenagatapho 75'; Sardor Mirzaev (yellow card) 10'; Chatmongkol Thongkiri (yellow card) 55'; Willian Popp (yellow card) 66'; Patcharapol Intanee (yellow card) 89'; Weerathep Pomphan (yellow card) 90+1'		Javier Patiño 57'; Philip Roller (yellow card) 68'; Justin Baas (yellow card) 73'; Praweenwat Boonyong (yellow card) 78'; Steeven Langil (yellow card) 87'	Stadium: SCG Stadium; Attendance: 2,942; Referee: Songkran Bunmeekiart

2 December 2020 8	Port (Thailand)	2–0	(Thailand) SCG Muangthong United	Pathum Thani province
	Adisak Kraisorn 30'; Nelson Bonilla 86'; Kevin Deeromram (yellow card) 43'; Siwakorn Jakkuprasat (yellow card) 73'; Sergio Suárez (yellow card) 77'	Report	Derley (yellow card) 29'; Weerathep Pomphan (yellow card) 40'	Stadium: Leo Stadium; Attendance: 3,050; Referee: Mongkolchai Pechsri

17 October 2020 9	SCG Muangthong United (Thailand)	0–1	(Thailand) Trat	Nonthaburi province
	Chatmongkol Thongkiri (yellow card) 27'; Daisuke Sato (yellow card) 58'; Weerathep Pomphan (yellow card) 72'	Report	Ricardo Santos 30'; Rangsan Wiroonsri (yellow card) 8'; Sittichok Paso (yellow card) 20'; Supoj Wonghoi (yellow card) 62'; Sathaporn Daengsee (yellow card) 79'; Suppawat Srinothai (yellow card) 82'; Suan Lam Mang (yellow card) 89'	Stadium: SCG Stadium; Attendance: 2,738; Referee: Anusorn Nookaew

25 October 2020 10	Police Tero (Thailand)	1–3	(Thailand) SCG Muangthong United	Bangkok
	Adisak Srikampang 57'; Greg Houla (yellow card) 61'; Arthit Boodjinda (yellow card) 64'; Kwon Dae-hee (red card) 90+2'		Willian Popp 53' (pen.) 69' (yellow card) 69'; Picha Autra 62'; Chatmongkol Thongkiri (yellow card) 79'; Suporn Peenagatapho (yellow card) 84'	Stadium: Boonyachinda Stadium; Attendance: 1,250; Referee: Niwat Insaard

31 October 2020 11	Buriram United (Thailand)	2–3	(Thailand) SCG Muangthong United	Buriram province
	Marko Šćepović 16'; Apiwat Ngaolamhin 79'; Pansa Hemviboon (yellow card) 28'; Supachai Jaided (yellow card) 59'; Ratthanakorn Maikami (yellow card) 64'; Jakkaphan Kaewprom (yellow card) 81'		Lucas Rocha 35' (yellow card) 51'; Derley 59' (pen.); Willian Popp 77'; Daisuke Sato (yellow card) 80'; Đặng Văn Lâm (yellow card) 90+5'	Stadium: Chang Arena; Attendance: 15,306; Referee: Sivakorn Pu-udom

22 November 2020 12	SCG Muangthong United (Thailand)	1–1	(Thailand) Nakhon Ratchasima Mazda	Nonthaburi province
	Willian Popp 45'; Derley (penalty missed) 36 Chatmongkol Thongkiri (yellow card) 64'		Dennis Murillo 53'; Leandro Assumpção (yellow card) 57'; Metee Taweekulkarn (yellow card) 70'	Stadium: SCG Stadium; Attendance: 4,732; Referee: Phairot Bunkamnoed

18 November 2020 13	Singha Chiangrai United (Thailand)	2–1	(Thailand) SCG Muangthong United	Chiangrai
	Jajá 6' 67' (pen.); Sanukran Thinjom (yellow card) 30'		Sardor Mirzaev 45+2'; Willian Popp (yellow card) 66'	Stadium: Singha Stadium; Attendance: 4,299; Referee: Wiwat Jumpaoon

11 December 2020 14	SCG Muangthong United (Thailand)	3–3	(Thailand) PT Prachuap	Nonthaburi province
	Derley 13' 70' (pen.); Sardor Mirzaev 86'; Weerathep Pomphan (yellow card) 61'		William Henrique 36' 66' (yellow card) 90+6'; Willen Mota 83'	Stadium: SCG Stadium; Attendance: 5,342; Referee: Winat Phophat

19 December 2020 15	SCG Muangthong United (Thailand)	3–1	(Thailand) Suphanburi	Nonthaburi province
	Sardor Mirzaev 14' 37'; Derley 27'; Chatmongkol Thongkiri (yellow card) 76'; Wattanakorn Sawatlakhorn (yellow card) 88'		Patrick Reichelt 82'; Ratchanat Arunyapairot (yellow card) 36'; Parndecha Ngernprasert (red card) 44'; Zulfahmi Arifin (yellow card) 45'; Wasan Homsan (yellow card) 89'	Stadium: SCG Stadium; Attendance: 2,948; Referee: Vitsavet Sangnakorn

26 December 2020 16	True Bangkok United (Thailand)	2–2	(Thailand) SCG Muangthong United	Pathum Thani province
	Chananan Pombuppha 59'; Pokklaw Anan 72'		Sardor Mirzaev 54'; Derley 77'	Stadium: Thammasat Stadium; Referee: Sahapop Sriboonlue

7 February 2021 17	SCG Muangthong United (Thailand)	4–0	(Thailand) Rayong	Nonthaburi province
	Suporn Peenagatapho 5'; Sardor Mirzaev 31'; Wongsakorn Chaikultewin 82'; Poramet Arjvirai 89'; Chatmongkol Thongkiri (yellow card) 45'; Patcharapol Intanee (yellow card) 81'		Adam Mitter (yellow card) 7'; Wasusiwakit Phusirit (red card) 90+2'	Stadium: SCG Stadium; Attendance: 0

11 February 2021 18	Chonburi (Thailand)	1–2	(Thailand) SCG Muangthong United	Chonburi province
	Jaycee John 90'; Channarong Promsrikaew (yellow card) 45'; Junior Eldstål (yellow card) 47'; Renato Kelić (yellow card) 75'; Rangsan Wiroonsri (yellow card) 78'		Willian Popp 45+1' (yellow card) 49'; Derley 81'; Sardor Mirzaev (yellow card) 75'	Stadium: Chonburi Stadium; Attendance: 0 Referee: Chaireag Ngamsom

14 February 2021 19	SCG Muangthong United (Thailand)	3–0	(Thailand) Sukhothai	Nonthaburi province
	Lucas Rocha 35'; Derley (penalty missed) 27 58'; Wongsakorn Chaikultewin 90+3'; Weerathep Pomphan (yellow card) 67'			Stadium: SCG Stadium; Attendance: 0

17 February 2021 20	Samut Prakan City (Thailand)	4–2	(Thailand) SCG Muangthong United	Samut Prakan province
	Barros Tardeli 27' 31' 45'; Jakkapan Praisuwan 28'		Sardor Mirzaev 14'; Willian Popp 19'	Stadium: Samut Prakan SAT Stadium (Keha Bang Phli); Attendance: 0 Referee: Songkran Bunmeekiart

20 February 2021 21	Ratchaburi Mitr Phol (Thailand)	1–3	(Thailand) SCG Muangthong United	Ratchaburi province
	Philip Roller 11' (pen.); Kritsananon Srisuwan (yellow card) 12'		Sardor Mirzaev 6' 25' 67'; Wongsakorn Chaikultewin (yellow card) 8'; Boontawee Theppawong (yellow card) 10'; Sorawit Panthong (yellow card) 15'	Stadium: Mitr Phol Stadium; Attendance: 0 Referee: Paisan Bendemalee

23 February 2021 22	SCG Muangthong United (Thailand)	2–1	(Thailand) Port	Nonthaburi province
	Sardor Mirzaev 51'; Willian Popp 67' (pen.); Chatchai Saengdao (yellow card) 24'		Bordin Phala (yellow card) 49'; Sergio Suárez 61' (pen.); Go Seul-ki (yellow card) 66'; Elias Dolah (yellow card) 90'	Stadium: SCG Stadium; Referee: Sivakorn Pu-udom

27 February 2021 23	Trat (Thailand)	2–3	(Thailand) SCG Muangthong United	Trat province
	Ricardo Santos 60' 84' (pen.); Júnior Lopes (yellow card) 18'; Kriangkrai Pimrat (yellow card) 17'		Suporn Peenagatapho 23'; Willian Popp 66' 90+5' (pen.) (yellow card) 43'; Saringkan Promsupa (yellow card) 37'; Wattanakorn Sawatlakhorn (yellow card) 39'; Lucas Rocha (yellow card) 83'	Stadium: Trat Provincial Stadium; Referee: Teetichai Nualjan

2 March 2021 24	SCG Muangthong United (Thailand)	1–2	(Thailand) Police Tero	Nonthaburi province
	Sorawit Panthong 90+4'; Boontawee Theppawong (yellow card) 29'; Willian Popp (yellow card) 34'; Derley (yellow card) 83'		Dragan Bošković 19' (pen.); Teeratep Winothai 45+4'; Supot Jodjam (yellow card) 29'; Kanokpon Buspakom (yellow card) 35'; Sanchai Nontasila (yellow card) 43'; Chumpol Bua-ngam (yellow card) 44'; Nattaphol Sukchai (yellow card) 90'	Stadium: SCG Stadium; Referee: Songkran Bunmeekiart

6 March 2021 25	SCG Muangthong United (Thailand)	2–2	(Thailand) Buriram United	Nonthaburi province
	Korrawit Tasa 57'; Suporn Peenagatapho 79'; Chatchai Saengdao (yellow card) 35'; Weerathep Pomphan (yellow card) 49'; Wattanakorn Sawatlakhorn (yellow card) 51'; Picha Autra (yellow card) 81'; Sardor Mirzaev (yellow card) 86'		Maicon 47'; Piyaphon Phanichakul 71' (yellow card) 83'; Tinnakorn Asurin (yellow card) 37'; Narubadin Weerawatnodom (yellow card) 38'	Stadium: SCG Stadium; Referee: Chaireag Ngamsom

9 March 2021 26	Nakhon Ratchasima Mazda (Thailand)	4–1	(Thailand) SCG Muangthong United	Nakhon Ratchasima province
	Dennis Murillo 42' 59' (pen.) 88' 90+7'		Derley 23'; Weerathep Pomphan (yellow card) 12'; Wattanakorn Sawatlakhorn (red card) 79'; Chatmongol Thongkiri (yellow card) 81'	Stadium: 80th Birthday Stadium; Referee: Teetichai Nualjan

13 March 2021 27	SCG Muangthong United (Thailand)	2–3	(Thailand) Singha Chiangrai United	Nonthaburi province
	Sardor Mirzaev 15'; Willian Popp 17' (yellow card) 39'; Wongsakorn Chaikultewin (yellow card) 54'; Derley (yellow card) 72'; Sarawut Kanlayanabandit (yellow card) 88'		Shinnaphat Leeaoh 30'; Cho Ji-hun 45+3'; Tanasak Srisai 90'; Wasan Homsan (yellow card) 32'; Sanukran Thinjom (yellow card) 62'; Bill (yellow card) 72'; Sivakorn Tiatrakul (yellow card) 90'	Stadium: SCG Stadium; Referee: Sivakorn Pu-udom

16 March 2021 28	PT Prachuap (Thailand)	1–0	(Thailand) SCG Muangthong United	Prachuap Khiri Khan province
	Yanto Basna 33' (yellow card) 50'; Peerawat Akkratum (yellow card) 43'			Stadium: Prachuap Khiri Khan province Stadium; Referee: Natee Choosuwan

20 March 2021 29	Suphanburi (Thailand)	1–2	(Thailand) SCG Muangthong United	Suphanburi province
	Leandro Assumpção 74'; Prasit Jantum (yellow card) 18' (yellow-red card) 90+5'; Supravee Miprathang (yellow card) 29'; Suphan Thongsong (red card) 41'; Bae Shin-young (yellow card) 71'; Caion (yellow card) 89'		Willian Popp 50' (yellow card) 79'; Sardor Mirzaev 90'; Chatmongkol Thongkiri (yellow card) 75'	Stadium: Suphan Buri Provincial Stadium; Referee: Niwat Insaard

23 March 2021 30	SCG Muangthong United (Thailand)	1–0	BG Pathum United	Nonthaburi province
	Willian Popp 42'; Lucas Rocha (yellow card) 25'; Sarawut Kanlayanabandit (yellow card) 49'		Diogo Luís Santo (yellow card) 7'; Thitiphan Puangjan (yellow card) 18'; Pathompol Charoenrattanapirom (yellow card) 54'; Andrés Túñez (yellow card) 62'; Victor Cardozo (yellow card) 62'; Sarach Yooyen (red card) 90+7'	Stadium: SCG Stadium; Referee: Warintorn Sassadee

=== Thai FA Cup ===
Win Draw Loss

7 November 2020 Round 1	SCG Muangthong United (Thailand)	10–0	(Thailand) Phatthana Nikhom City FC	Nonthaburi province
	Poramet Arjvirai 24' (pen.) 44' 69'; Saharat Kanyaroj 52'; Phumin Kaewta 65' 78' 86'; Sundy Wongderree 82'; Sorawit Panthong 84' 90'	Report		Stadium: SCG Stadium; Referee: Tastarawut Khantavichai

6 December 2020 Round 2	SCG Muangthong United (Thailand)	2–1 (a.e.t.)	(Thailand) BG Pathum United F.C.	Nonthaburi province
	Sardor Mirzaev 5'; Suporn Peenagatapho 103'; Weerathep Pomphan (yellow card) 34'; Patcharapol Intanee (yellow card) 110'; Lucas Rocha (yellow card) 112'; Somporn Yos (yellow card) 120+5'		Mitsuru Maruoka 66'; Thitipan Puangchan (yellow card) 19'; Andrés Túñez (yellow card) 101'	Stadium: SCG Stadium; Referee: Songkran Bunmeekiart

3 February 2021 Last 16	SCG Muangthong United (Thailand)	1–0	(Thailand) Samut Prakan City	Nonthaburi province
	Wattana Playnum 6'			Stadium: SCG Stadium; Referee: Sarayut Jakngoen

3 April 2021 QF	Buriram United (Thailand)	2–0	(Thailand) SCG Muangthong United	Buriram province
	Samuel Rosa 72' (pen.); Supachok Sarachat 77'; Narubadin Weerawatnodom (yellow card) 40'			Stadium: Chang Arena; Referee: Wiwat Jumpaoon

=== Thai League Cup ===
Win Draw Loss

== Team statistics ==
=== Appearances and goals ===
As of 26 Sept 2020

No.	Pos.	Player	League 1		FA Cup		League Cup		Total	
No.	Pos.	Player	Apps.	Goals	Apps.	Goals	Apps.	Goals	Apps.	Goals
3	DF	(Brazil) Lucas Rocha	24	2	3	0	0	0	26	2
4	DF	(Thailand) Sarawut Kanlayanabandit	4(1)	0	1	0	0	0	5	0
5	DF	(Thailand) Suporn Peenagatapho	24(4)	4	3	1	0	0	30	5
7	MF	(Thailand) Sorawit Panthong	9(9)	1	1	2	0	0	19	3
8	FW	(Thailand) Korrawit Tasa	3(10)	1	1(2)	0	0	0	15	1
9	FW	(Thailand) Sihanart Sutisuk	0(3)	0	0	0	0	0	3	0
10	MF	(Uzbekistan) Sardor Mirzaev	23(2)	13	3	0	0	0	27	13
11	MF	(Thailand) Phumin Kaewta	0(3)	0	0(1)	3	0	0	4	3
13	MF	(Thailand) Sundy Wongderree	0(2)	1	0(1)	1	0	0	4	2
14	MF	(Thailand) Chatmongkol Thongkiri	16(8)	0	2(1)	0	0	0	26	0
15	DF	(Thailand) Saringkan Promsupa	17(2)	0	1(1)	0	0	0	21	0
16	DF	(Thailand) Patcharapol Intanee	8(5)	0	1(1)	0	0	0	15	0
18	MF	(Thailand) Weerathep Pomphan	20(4)	0	3	0	0	0	26	0
19	FW	(Brazil) Willian Popp	19(2)	12	2	0	0	0	22	12
20	FW	(Thailand) Poramet Arjvirai	4(12)	1	2	3	0	0	17	4
21	DF	(Thailand) Sakunchai Saengthopho	0(2)	0	0(1)	0	0	0	3	0
23	DF	(Thailand) (Italy) Marco Ballini	3(2)	0	1(1)	0	0	0	6	0
24	MF	(Thailand) Wongsakorn Chaikultewin	9(8)	2	1(2)	0	0	0	19	2
25	MF	(Thailand) Saharat Kanyaroj	8(13)	1	2(2)	1	0	0	24	2
29	GK	(Thailand) Somporn Yos	18	0	4	0	0	0	21	0
30	DF	(Thailand) Wattanakorn Sawatlakhorn	16(1)	0	4	0	0	0	20	0
31	DF	(Thailand) Chatchai Saengdao	7(3)	0	2	0	0	0	12	0
34	MF	(Thailand) Wattana Playnum	17(2)	0	3	1	0	0	22	1
36	DF	(Thailand) Petcharat Chotipala	4(2)	0	0	0	0	0	6	0
37	MF	(Thailand) Picha Autra	13(7)	1	2	0	0	0	21	1
39	DF	(Thailand) Boontawee Theppawong	6(3)	0	0	0	0	0	8	0
66	DF	(Philippines) Daisuke Sato	10	0	0	0	0	0	10	0
87	FW	(Brazil) Derley	29	11	2	0	0	0	30	11
Players who have played this season and/or sign for the season but had left the club or on loan to other club
1	GK	(Vietnam) (Russia) Đặng Văn Lâm	12	0	0	0	0	0	12	0
4	MF	(Thailand) Atikun Mheetuam	0(2)	0	0(1)	0	0	0	3	0
6	MF	(Thailand) Sarach Yooyen	4	0	0	0	0	0	0	0
