= 2022–23 Muangthong United F.C. season =

Muangthong United
2022–23 season
- Chairman: Wilak Lohtong
- Manager: Mario Gjurovski
- Stadium: Thunderdome Stadium, Pak Kret, Nonthaburi, Thailand
- Thai League T1: 4th
- Thai FA Cup: Fourth Round
- Thai League Cup: Second Round
- Top goalscorer: League: Willian Popp (14); All: Willian Popp (15)

The 2022–23 season is Muangthong United Football Club's 16th existence in the new era since they took over from Nongchok Pittaya Nusorn Football Club in 2007. It is the sixth season in the Thai League and the club's 14th consecutive season in the top flight of the Thai football league system since promoted in the 2009 season.

== Squad ==
As of 31 May 2023

Squad No.	Name	Nationality	Date of birth (age)	Previous club
Goalkeepers
1	Patiwat Khammai	(Thailand)	24 December 1994 (age 31)	(Thailand) True Bangkok United F.C.
16	Kanapod Kadee	(Thailand)	26 June 2002 (age 23)	Youth team
26	Kawin Thamsatchanan	(Thailand)	26 January 1990 (age 36)	(Belgium) OH Leuven
33	Korrakot Pipatnadda	(Thailand)	15 July 1999 (age 26)	Youth team
36	Khanokchai Thalodthaisong	(Thailand)	24 March 2005 (age 21)	Youth team
Defenders
2	Jesper Nyholm	(Philippines)	10 September 1993 (age 32)	(Sweden) Djurgården
3	Lucas Rocha (3rd captain)	(Brazil)	19 June 1995 (age 31)	(Brazil) Atlético Clube Goianiense
4	Chatchai Saengdao	(Thailand)	11 January 1997 (age 29)	Youth team
5	Suporn Peenagatapho (Captain)	(Thailand)	12 July 1995 (age 30)	Youth team
14	Kitphom Bunsan	(Thailand)	29 November 1993 (age 32)	(Thailand) Khon Kaen United F.C.
15	Chayapol Supma	(Thailand)	6 February 1997 (age 29)	Youth team
17	Ronan Pluijmen	(Thailand)	26 June 2003 (age 22)	(Netherlands) Fortuna Sittard
29	Songwut Kraikruan	(Thailand)	6 November 2001 (age 24)	Youth team
39	Boontawee Theppawong	(Thailand)	2 January 1996 (age 30)	Youth team
Midfielders
6	Teeraphol Yoryoei	(Thailand)	25 October 1994 (age 31)	(Thailand) Samut Prakan City F.C.
7	Ekanit Panya	(Thailand)	21 October 1999 (age 26)	(Thailand) Singha Chiangrai United F.C.
10	Sardor Mirzaev	(Uzbekistan)	21 March 1991 (age 35)	(Uzbekistan) PFC Lokomotiv Tashkent
11	Jaroensak Wonggorn	(Thailand)	18 May 1997 (age 29)	(Thailand) BG Pathum United F.C.
18	Weerathep Pomphan	(Thailand)	27 July 1997 (age 28)	(Thailand) Chamchuri United F.C.
21	Purachet Thodsanit	(Thailand)	9 May 2001 (age 25)	Youth team
22	Phumin Kaewta	(Thailand)	12 March 1995 (age 31)	(Thailand) Samut Prakan City F.C.
23	Kannarin Thawornsak	(Thailand)	27 May 1997 (age 29)	(Thailand) Port F.C.
24	Wongsakorn Chaikultewin	(Thailand)	16 September 1996 (age 29)	Youth team
31	Punnawat Chote-Jirachaithon	(Thailand)	13 June 2002 (age 24)	Youth team
34	Kakana Khamyok	(Thailand)	21 May 2004 (age 22)	(Thailand) Assumption United F.C.
37	Picha Autra (Vice-captain)	(Thailand)	7 January 1996 (age 30)	(Thailand) Samut Prakan City F.C.
67	Nitisak Anulun	(Thailand)	11 February 2003 (age 23)	Youth team
80	Peerapong Panyanumaporn	(Thailand)	1 June 1996 (age 30)	(Thailand) Bangkok F.C.
Strikers
8	Willian Popp	(Brazil)	13 April 1994 (age 32)	(Brazil) Associação Chapecoense de Futebol
9	Henri Anier	(Estonia)	17 December 1990 (age 35)	(Estonia) Paide Linnameeskond
19	Eric Johana Omondi	(Kenya)	18 August 1994 (age 31)	(Belgium) Waasland-Beveren
20	Poramet Arjvirai	(Thailand)	20 July 1998 (age 27)	Youth team
Players loaned out / left club during season
-	Sakunchai Saengthopho	(Thailand)	7 June 1999 (age 27)	Youth team
-	Marut Budrak	(Thailand)	21 May 1998 (age 28)	(Thailand) Assumption United F.C.
11	Adisak Kraisorn	(Thailand)	1 February 1991 (age 35)	(Thailand) BEC Tero Sasana
45	Chutikom Klinjumpasri	(Thailand)	21 June 2002 (age 24)	Youth team
15	Hong Sung-wook	(South Korea)	17 September 2002 (age 23)	(South Korea) Jeju United FC
88	Saharat Kanyaroj	(Thailand)	9 June 1994 (age 32)	(Thailand) PTT Rayong F.C.
1	Somporn Yos	(Thailand)	23 June 1993 (age 33)	(Thailand) PT Prachuap F.C.
30	Peerapong Ruennin	(Thailand)	14 September 1995 (age 30)	(Thailand) Sukhothai F.C.
33	Wattanakorn Sawatlakhorn	(Thailand)	23 May 1998 (age 28)	Youth team
8	Korrawit Tasa	(Thailand)	7 April 2000 (age 26)	Youth team

== Transfer ==
=== In ===
Pre-season transfer

Position	Player	Transferred From	Ref
MF	(Thailand) Ekanit Panya	(Thailand) Singha Chiangrai United F.C.	THB30m
FW	(Kenya) Eric Johana Omondi	(Belgium) Waasland-Beveren	Undisclosed
DF	(Thailand) Ronan Pluijmen	(Netherlands) Fortuna Sittard	Undisclosed
GK	(Thailand) Kawin Thamsatchanan	(Belgium) OH Leuven	Undisclosed

Mid-season transfer

Position	Player	Transferred From	Ref
FW	(Brazil) Willian Popp	(Brazil) Chapecoense	Undisclosed
MF	(Thailand) Kannarin Thawornsak	(Thailand) Port F.C.	Undisclosed
DF	(Thailand) Kitphom Bunsan	(Thailand) Khon Kaen United F.C.	Undisclosed
MF	(Thailand) Kakana Khamyok	(Thailand) Assumption United F.C.	Undisclosed
MF	(Thailand) Jaroensak Wonggorn	(Thailand) BG Pathum United F.C.	Undisclosed
GK	(Thailand) Rithisak Kalaya	(Thailand) Nakhon Ratchasima United F.C.	Undisclosed

=== Out ===
Preseason

Position	Player	Transferred To	Ref
FW	(Brazil) Willian Popp	(Brazil) Chapecoense	Undisclosed
DF	(Thailand) Phituckchai Limraksa	(Thailand) Kasetsart F.C.	Free
MF	(Thailand) Atikun Mheetuam	(Thailand) Singha Chiangrai United F.C.	Free
DF	(Thailand) Marco Ballini	(Thailand) Singha Chiangrai United F.C.	Undisclosed
FW	(Thailand) Sihanart Suttisak	(Thailand) Songkhla F.C.	Free
DF	(Thailand) Petcharat Chotipala	(Thailand) PT Prachuap F.C.	Free
GK	(Thailand) Panupan Juheang	(Thailand) Uthai Thani F.C.	Free
MF	(Thailand) Tanapat Waempracha	(Thailand) Nongbua Pitchaya F.C.	Free

Mid-season

Position	Player	Transferred To	Ref
DF	(South Korea) Hong Sung-wook	(South Korea) Jeju United FC	Loan return
FW	(Thailand) Adisak Kraisorn	(Malaysia) Terengganu FC	Free
GK	(Thailand) Somporn Yos	(Thailand) Port F.C.	Free
FW	(Thailand) Korrawit Tasa	(Thailand) BG Pathum United F.C.	Undisclosed
DF	(Thailand) Wattanakorn Sawatlakhorn	(Thailand) BG Pathum United F.C.	Undisclosed
DF	(Thailand) Anuwat Phikulsri	(Thailand) Nonthaburi United F.C.	Free
DF	(Thailand) Thanakorn Pornrumdet	Unattached	Released

=== Loan In ===
Preseason

Position	Player	Loaned From	Ref
DF	(South Korea) Hong Sung-wook	(South Korea) Jeju United FC	Season loan

Mid-Season

Position	Player	Loaned From	Ref
GK	(Thailand) Patiwat Khammai	(Thailand) True Bangkok United F.C.	Season loan

=== Loan Out ===
Preseason

Position	Player	Loaned To	Ref
DF	(Thailand) Patcharapol Intanee	(Thailand) Nakhon Ratchasima F.C.	Season loan
FW	(Thailand) Rittiporn Wanchuen	(Thailand) Nakhon Ratchasima F.C.	Season loan
MF	(Thailand) Chayapol Supma	(Thailand) Nakhon Ratchasima F.C.	Season loan
MF	(Thailand) Nontawat Klinchampasri	(Thailand) Khon Kaen F.C.	Season loan
DF	(Thailand) Sundy Wongderree	(Thailand) Kasem Bundit University F.C.	Season loan
DF	(Thailand) Theerapat Laohabut	(Thailand) Chainat Hornbill F.C.	Season loan
FW	(Thailand) Sarayut Yoosuebchuea	(Thailand) Chainat Hornbill F.C.	Season loan
GK	(Thailand) Korrakot Pipatnadda	(Thailand) Udon Thani F.C.	Season loan
MF	(Thailand) Oliver Granberg	(Thailand) Nakhon Ratchasima F.C.	Season loan
GK	(Thailand) Soponwit Rakyart	(Thailand) Phrae United F.C.	Season loan
DF	(Thailand) Chutikom Klinchampasri	(Thailand) Nonthaburi United	Season loan
MF	(Thailand) Sorawit Panthong	(Thailand) Police Tero	Two-seasons loan

Mid-Season

Position	Player	Loaned To	Ref
MF	(Thailand) Saharat Kanyaroj	(Thailand) Nakhon Ratchasima F.C.	Season loan
GK	(Thailand) Peerapong Ruennin	(Thailand) Nongbua Pitchaya F.C.	Season loan
MF	(Thailand) Nontawat Klinchampasri	(Thailand) Hua Hin City F.C.	Season loan
MF	(Thailand) Sakunchai Saengthopho	(Thailand) Samut Prakan City F.C.	Season loan
GK	(Thailand) Kanapod Kadee	(Thailand) Samutsongkhram F.C.	Season loan
DF	(Thailand) Suttapat Sanklong	(Thailand) Nakhon Ratchasima United F.C.	Season loan
MF	(Thailand) Adtaphol Chaikol	(Thailand) Nakhon Ratchasima United F.C.	Season loan
MF	(Thailand) Natthaphong Changple	(Thailand) Nakhon Ratchasima United F.C.	Season loan

== Friendlies ==
=== Pre-Season Friendly ===
Win Draw Loss

=== In-Season friendlies ===
Win Draw Loss

== Competitions ==
=== Overview ===
Competition	First match	Last match	Starting round	Final position	Record							
Competition	First match	Last match	Starting round	Final position	Pld	W	D	L	GF	GA	GD	Win %
Thai League	13 August 2022	12 May 2023	Matchday 1	4th	30	14	8	8	56	37	+19	46.67
FA Cup	1 November 2022	8 February 2023	Second Round	Fourth Round	3	2	0	1	10	2	+8	66.67
League Cup	16 November 2022	25 January 2023	First Round	Second Round	2	1	0	1	3	2	+1	50.00
Total					35	17	8	10	69	41	+28	48.57

Last updated: 12 May 2023
Source: Competitions

=== Thai League 1 ===
==== League table ====
Pos	Team	Pld	W	D	L	GF	GA	GD	Pts	Qualification
2	Bangkok United (Q)	30	19	5	6	55	22	+33	62	Qualification for 2023–24 AFC Champions League group stage
3	Port (Q)	30	14	10	6	52	38	+14	52	Qualification for 2023–24 AFC Champions League qualifying play-offs
4	Muangthong United	30	14	8	8	56	37	+19	50	
5	Chiangrai United	30	12	8	10	44	42	+2	44	
6	Chonburi	30	13	4	13	46	38	+8	43 (Note: Chonburi ahead on head-to-head points record; Chonburi 6 pts, Police Tero 0 pt.)	

Updated to match(es) played on 12 May 2023. Source: Thai League
Rules for classification: 1) Points; 2) Head-to-head points; 3) Head-to-head goals difference; 4) Head-to-head goals scored; 5) Overall goals difference; 6) Overall goals scored; 7) Fair play points; 8) Play-off without extra time;).
(Q) Qualified for the phase indicated

==== Results summary ====
Overall								Home						Away					
Pld	W	D	L	GF	GA	GD	Pts	W	D	L	GF	GA	GD	W	D	L	GF	GA	GD
30	14	8	8	56	37	+19	50	9	4	2	33	16	+17	5	4	6	23	21	+2

==== Matches ====
Win Draw Loss

=== Thai FA Cup ===
==== Matches ====
Win Draw Loss

=== Thai League Cup ===
==== Matches ====
Win Draw Loss

== Team statistics ==
=== Appearances and goals ===
As of 12 May 2023

No.	Pos.	Player	Thai League		FA Cup		League Cup		Total	
No.	Pos.	Player	Apps.	Goals	Apps.	Goals	Apps.	Goals	Apps.	Goals
1	GK	(Thailand) Patiwat Khammai	14	0	1	0	1	0	16	0
2	DF	(Philippines) Jesper Nyholm	22	1	2	0	1	0	25	1
3	DF	(Brazil) Lucas Rocha	24	2	1	0	2	0	27	2
4	DF	(Thailand) Chatchai Saengdao	6	0	2	0	1	0	9	0
5	DF	(Thailand) Suporn Peenagatapho	22	2	2	0	2	0	26	2
6	MF	(Thailand) Teeraphol Yoryoei	15	0	3	0	2	0	20	0
7	MF	(Thailand) Ekanit Panya	28	3	3	2	2	1	33	6
8	FW	(Brazil) Willian Popp	14	14	1	0	1	1	16	15
9	FW	(Estonia) Henri Anier	17	2	1	1	1	1	19	4
10	MF	(Uzbekistan) Sardor Mirzaev	30	5	2	0	0	0	32	5
11	MF	(Thailand) Jaroensak Wonggorn	15	2	1	0	1	0	17	2
14	DF	(Thailand) Kitphom Bunsan	10	0	1	0	0	0	11	0
15	DF	(Thailand) Chayapol Supma	2	0	0	0	0	0	2	0
16	GK	(Thailand) Kanapod Kadee	0	0	1	0	1	0	2	0
17	DF	(Thailand) Ronan Pluijmen	3	0	2	0	1	0	6	0
18	MF	(Thailand) Weerathep Pomphan	29	1	1	0	2	0	32	1
19	FW	(Kenya) Eric Johana Omondi	23	9	3	1	2	0	28	10
20	FW	(Thailand) Poramet Arjvirai	29	6	1	0	2	0	32	6
21	MF	(Thailand) Purachet Thodsanit	0	0	2	0	0	0	2	0
22	MF	(Thailand) Phumin Kaewta	6	1	1	1	0	0	7	2
23	MF	(Thailand) Kannarin Thawornsak	5	0	0	0	0	0	5	0
24	MF	(Thailand) Wongsakorn Chaikultewin	16	1	1	1	1	0	18	2
26	GK	(Thailand) Kawin Thamsatchanan	0	0	0	0	0	0	0	0
29	DF	(Thailand) Songwut Kraikruan	14	0	1	0	0	0	15	0
31	MF	(Thailand) Punnawat Chote-Jirachaithon	5	0	2	1	0	0	7	1
33	GK	(Thailand) Korrakot Pipatnadda	1	0	0	0	0	0	1	0
34	MF	(Thailand) Kakana Khamyok	6	0	1	0	1	0	8	0
36	GK	(Thailand) Khanokchai Thalodthaisong	0	0	0	0	0	0	0	0
37	MF	(Thailand) Picha Autra	27	1	2	0	1	0	30	1
39	DF	(Thailand) Boontawee Theppawong	20	0	2	0	2	0	24	0
67	MF	(Thailand) Nitisak Anulun	0	0	1	0	0	0	1	0
80	MF	(Thailand) Peerapong Panyanumaporn	0	0	0	0	0	0	0	0
Players who have played this season and/or sign for the season but had left the club or on loan to other clubs
1	GK	(Thailand) Somporn Yos	13	0	0	0	0	0	13	0
8	FW	(Thailand) Korrawit Tasa	5	0	1	2	1	0	7	2
11	FW	(Thailand) Adisak Kraisorn	12	4	2	1	0	0	14	5
15	DF	(Thailand) Hong Sung-wook	3	0	1	0	0	0	4	0
30	GK	(Thailand) Peerapong Ruennin	2	0	1	0	0	0	3	0
33	DF	(Thailand) Wattanakorn Sawatlakhorn	14	0	0	0	1	0	15	0
88	MF	(Thailand) Saharat Kanyaroj	7	1	2	0	1	0	10	1
