= 2018 SCG Muangthong United F.C. season =

SCG Muangthong United
2018 season
- Chairman: Wilak Lohtong
- Manager: Totchtawan Sripan (until 12 March); Santi Chaiyaphuak (Caretaker, from 12 March); Radovan Ćurčić (from 29 April)
- Stadium: SCG Stadium, Pak Kret, Nonthaburi, Thailand
- Thai League T1: 4th
- Thai FA Cup: Round of 32
- Thai League Cup: Round of 16
- AFC Champions League: Play-off round
- Top goalscorer: League: Heberty (17); All: Heberty (20)
Home colours	Away colours	Third colours

The 2018 season is SCG Muangthong United Football Club's 12th existence in the new era since they took over from Nongchok Pittaya Nusorn Football Club in 2007. It is the third season in the Thai League and the club's tenth consecutive season in the top flight of the Thai football league system since promoted in the 2009 season.

== League by seasons ==
Season	League	Position	Notes
2007	Thai League Division 2	1st	* Began of the new era by competed as Muangthong Nongchok United F.C. * Promoted to Thai Division 1 League
2008	Thai Division 1 League	1st	* Renamed to Muangthong United F.C. * Promoted to Thai Premier League
2009	Thai Premier League	1st	
2010	Thai Premier League	1st	
2011	Thai Premier League	3rd	
2012	Thai Premier League	1st	Renamed to SCG Muangthong United F.C.
2013	Thai Premier League	2nd	
2014	Thai Premier League	5th	
2015	Thai Premier League	2nd	
2016	Thai League	1st	Thai Premier League renamed to Thai League
2017	Thai League	2nd	
2018	Thai League	4th	

== Competitions ==
=== Thai League ===
Date	Opponents	H / A	Result F–A	Scorers	League position
10 February 2018	Bangkok United	A	3–2	Chenrop (3) 59', 76', 84'	3rd
17 February 2018	Port	H	0–2		12th
23 February 2018	Air Force Central	A	1–0	Jajá 29'	6th
3 March 2018	Chiangrai United	H	1–1	Jajá 40'	6th
11 March 2018	PT Prachuap	A	1–6	Jajá 55'	10th
17 March 2018	Ubon UMT United	H	2–1	Heberty 54', Tristan 59'	7th
28 March 2018	Nakhon Ratchasima Mazda	A	1–0	Heberty 47'	5th
1 April 2018	Bangkok Glass	H	2–2	Heberty 28' (pen.), Chenrop 67'	6th
8 April 2018	Navy	H	4–0	Tristan 19', Ratchapol 37', Heberty (2) 39', 84'	3rd
11 April 2018	Suphanburi	H	2–2	Tristan 13', Heberty 90+2'	4th
21 April 2018	Chonburi	A	1–1	Tristan 44'	6th
25 April 2018	Police Tero	H	2–2	Tristan 69', Heberty 78'	4th
29 April 2018	Ratchaburi Mitr Phol	H	2–2	Heberty (2) 71', 76'	6th
5 May 2018	Buriram United	A	0–4		8th
13 May 2018	Chainat Hornbill	H	2–0	Chappuis (2) 41', 65'	6th
20 May 2018	Sukhothai	H	4–3	Heberty (3) 34' (pen.), 45', 45+2', Adisorn 90+4'	6th
26 May 2018	Pattaya United	A	4–0	Sanukran 34', Jajá 44', Heberty (2) 78', 90+3'	4th
9 June 2018	Port	A	3–2	Sanukran 46', Sarach 48', Heberty 52'	4th
17 June 2018	Air Force Central	H	3–1	Heberty (2) 32' (pen.), 83', Jajá 40'	4th
24 June 2018	Chiangrai United	A	3–0	Ho 45+2', Tristan 86', Jajá 90+2'	4th
1 July 2018	PT Prachuap	H	1–2	Heberty 66'	4th
7 July 2018	Ubon UMT United	A	0–0		4th
15 July 2018	Nakhon Ratchasima Mazda	H	0–0		4th
21 July 2018	Bangkok Glass	A	1–3	Jajá 50'	5th
28 July 2018	Navy	A	2–0	Heberty (2) 74', 90+4' (pen.)	4th
5 August 2018	Suphanburi	A	1–1	Sarach 40'	4th
5 September 2018	Chonburi	H	4–1	Chappuis 21', Jajá (2) 68', 90+2', Heberty 72'	4th
8 September 2018	Police Tero	A	4–2	Jajá 56', Weerawut 58', Poramet 86', Heberty 90+3' (pen.)	3rd
12 September 2018	Ratchaburi Mitr Phol	A	2–1	Jajá (2) 83', 90+2'	3rd
16 September 2018	Buriram United	H	0–3		3rd
22 September 2018	Chainat Hornbill	A	1–2	Sarach 36'	3rd
30 September 2018	Sukhothai	A	3–2	Jajá 20', Heberty 59', Sanukran 90+4'	3rd
3 October 2018	Pattaya United	H	5–5	Jajá 13', Heberty (3) 25', 37', 66', Wattana 90+5'	4th
7 October 2018	Bangkok United	H	0–0		4th

Pos	Team	Pld	W	D	L	GF	GA	GD	Pts	Qualification or relegation
2	Bangkok United (Q)	34	21	8	5	68	36	+32	71	Qualification to 2019 AFC Champions League Preliminary round 2
3	Port	34	19	4	11	73	45	+28	61	
4	Muangthong United	34	16	11	7	65	53	+12	59	
5	Chiangrai United (Q)	34	15	10	9	52	36	+16	55	Qualification to 2019 AFC Champions League Preliminary round 2 (Note: Chiangrai United qualified to the 2019 AFC Champions League Preliminary round 2 as winners of the 2018 Thai FA Cup.)
6	Prachuap	34	15	8	11	56	46	+10	53	

Source: Thai League
Rules for classification: 1) Points; 2) Head-to-head points; 3) Head-to-head goals difference; 4) Head-to-head goals scored; 5) Overall goals difference; 6) Overall goals scored; 7) Fair play points; 8) Play-off without extra time;).
(Q) Qualified for the phase indicated

=== Thai FA Cup ===
Date	Opponents	H / A	Result F–A	Scorers	Round
27 June 2018	Nongbua Pitchaya	H	1–0	Heberty 46'	Round of 64
4 July 2018	Army United	H	2–0	Heberty 46', Jajá 54'	Round of 32
25 July 2018	Chiangrai United	A	0–0 (a.e.t.) (4–5p)		Round of 16

=== Thai League Cup ===
Date	Opponents	H / A	Result F–A	Scorers	Round
13 June 2018	Udon Thani	A	2–1	Adisorn 12', Chenrop 20'	Round of 32
11 July 2018	Chonburi	A	1–5	Célio 29'	Round of 16

=== AFC Champions League ===
Qualifying play-offs

Date	Opponents	H / A	Result F–A	Scorers	Round
23 January 2018	(Malaysia) Johor Darul Ta'zim	H	5–2	Sarach 7', Tristan 21', Heberty (2) 29' (pen.), 63', Theerathon 56'	Preliminary round 2
30 January 2018	(Japan) Kashiwa Reysol	A	0–3		Play-off round

== Squad appearances statistics ==
No.	Pos.	Name	League	FA Cup	League Cup	Asia	Total
1	GK	(Thailand) Kampol Pathom-attakul	6+1	0	1	2	9+1
2	DF	(Thailand) Peerapat Notchaiya	20	1	0	1	22
4	DF	(Thailand) Suporn Peenagatapho	4+2	1	0	0	5+2
5	DF	(Japan) Naoaki Aoyama	19+1	0	0+1	0	19+2
6	MF	(Thailand) Sarach Yooyen (c)	19	1	0+1	2	22+1
7	FW	(Brazil) Heberty Fernandes (3rd)	20	1	0+1	2	23+1
9	FW	(Thailand) Adisak Kraisorn	0	0	0	1	1
14	MF	(Thailand) Sorawit Panthong	8+4	0+1	1	0	9+5
15	MF	(South Korea) Lee Ho	3	1	1	2	7
16	MF	(Thailand) Sanukran Thinjom	9+6	1	1	0	11+6
19	DF	(Thailand) Tristan Do (vc)	18+1	1	1	2	22+1
20	FW	(Thailand) Poramet Arjvirai	0+1	0	0	0	0+1
22	FW	(Thailand) Chenrop Samphaodi	1+7	1	1	0	3+7
23	MF	(Thailand) Charyl Chappuis	16	1	1	1+1	19+1
24	DF	(Thailand) Patcharapol Intanee	4+4	1	0	0	5+4
25	DF	(Thailand) Adison Promrak	8+2	0	1	1+1	10+3
27	FW	(Thailand) Peerapong Panyanumaporn	1+3	0+1	1	0	2+4
28	GK	(Thailand) Prasit Padungchok	14	1	0	0	15
29	DF	(Brazil) Célio Santos	2	0	0	2	4
30	GK	(Thailand) Suthipong Pisansab	0	0	0	0	0
32	DF	(Thailand) Saringkan Promsupa	0	0	0	0	0
33	DF	(Thailand) Chayapol Supma	0	0	0	0	0
34	MF	(Thailand) Wattana Playnum	8+1	0+1	1	0+1	9+3
35	DF	(Thailand) Weerawut Kayem	0+1	0	1	0	1+1
39	MF	(Thailand) Reungyos Janchaichit	0	0	0	0	0
42	MF	(Thailand) Wongsakorn Chaikultewin	0	0	0	0	0
50	FW	(Brazil) Jajá	10+2	0	0	0+2	10+4
59	DF	(Thailand) Nukoolkit Krutyai	5+3	0	0	2	7+3
92	GK	(Thailand) Putthipong Promlee	0	0	0	0	0
N/A	MF	(Thailand) Sundy Wongderree	0	0	0	0	0
Left club during season
-	DF	(Thailand) Theerathon Bunmathan	0	0	0	2	2
-	FW	(Thailand) Teerasil Dangda	0	0	0	2	2
-	MF	(Thailand) Thossawat Limwannasathian	10+4	0	0	0	10+4
-	MF	(Thailand) Ratchapol Nawanno	6+3	0	0	0	6+3
-	FW	(Thailand) Suksan Mungpao	0+4	0	0	0	0+4
-	FW	(Thailand) Siroch Chatthong	4+5	0	0	0	4+5
-	MF	(Thailand) Prakit Deeprom	4+2	0	0	0	4+2

== Squad goals statistics ==
No.	Pos.	Name	League	FA Cup	League Cup	Asia	Total
1	GK	(Thailand) Kampol Pathom-attakul	0	0	0	0	0
2	DF	(Thailand) Peerapat Notchaiya	0	0	0	0	0
4	DF	(Thailand) Suporn Peenagatapho	0	0	0	0	0
5	DF	(Japan) Naoaki Aoyama	0	0	0	0	0
6	MF	(Thailand) Sarach Yooyen (c)	1	0	0	1	2
7	FW	(Brazil) Heberty Fernandes (3rd)	17	1	0	2	20
9	FW	(Thailand) Adisak Kraisorn	0	0	0	0	0
14	MF	(Thailand) Sorawit Panthong	0	0	0	0	0
15	MF	(South Korea) Lee Ho	1	0	0	0	1
16	MF	(Thailand) Sanukran Thinjom	2	0	0	0	2
19	DF	(Thailand) Tristan Do (vc)	6	0	0	1	7
20	FW	(Thailand) Poramet Arjvirai	0	0	0	0	0
22	FW	(Thailand) Chenrop Samphaodi	4	0	1	0	5
23	MF	(Thailand) Charyl Chappuis	2	0	0	0	2
24	DF	(Thailand) Patcharapol Intanee	0	0	0	0	0
25	DF	(Thailand) Adison Promrak	1	0	1	0	2
27	FW	(Thailand) Peerapong Panyanumaporn	0	0	0	0	0
28	GK	(Thailand) Prasit Padungchok	0	0	0	0	0
29	DF	(Brazil) Célio Santos	0	0	0	0	0
30	GK	(Thailand) Suthipong Pisansab	0	0	0	0	0
32	DF	(Thailand) Saringkan Promsupa	0	0	0	0	0
33	DF	(Thailand) Chayapol Supma	0	0	0	0	0
34	MF	(Thailand) Wattana Playnum	0	0	0	0	0
35	DF	(Thailand) Weerawut Kayem	0	0	0	0	0
39	MF	(Thailand) Reungyos Janchaichit	0	0	0	0	0
42	MF	(Thailand) Wongsakorn Chaikultewin	0	0	0	0	0
50	FW	(Brazil) Jajá	6	0	0	0	6
59	DF	(Thailand) Nukoolkit Krutyai	0	0	0	0	0
92	GK	(Thailand) Putthipong Promlee	0	0	0	0	0
N/A	MF	(Thailand) Sundy Wongderree	0	0	0	0	0
Left club during season
-	DF	(Thailand) Theerathon Bunmathan	0	0	0	1	1
-	FW	(Thailand) Teerasil Dangda	0	0	0	0	0
-	MF	(Thailand) Thossawat Limwannasathian	0	0	0	0	0
-	MF	(Thailand) Ratchapol Nawanno	1	0	0	0	1
-	FW	(Thailand) Suksan Mungpao	0	0	0	0	0
-	FW	(Thailand) Siroch Chatthong	0	0	0	0	0
-	MF	(Thailand) Prakit Deeprom	0	0	0	0	0

== Overall summary ==
=== Season summary ===
Games played	24 (20 Thai League, 1 FA Cup, 1 League Cup, 2 Champions League)
Games won	14 (11 Thai League, 1 FA Cup, 1 League Cup, 1 Champions League)
Games drawn	6 (6 Thai League, 0 FA Cup, 0 League Cup, 0 Champions League)
Games lost	4 (3 Thai League, 0 FA Cup, 0 League Cup, 1 Champions League)
Goals scored	49 (41 Thai League, 1 FA Cup, 2 League Cup, 5 Champions League)
Goals conceded	37 (31 Thai League, 0 FA Cup, 1 League Cup, 5 Champions League)
Goal difference	+12
Clean sheets	7 (6 Thai League, 1 FA Cup, 0 League Cup, 0 Champions League)
Best result	4-0 (2 games)
Worst result	1-6 vs PT Prachuap (11 March 18)
Most appearances	(Brazil) Heberty (24)
Top scorer	(Brazil) Heberty (20)
Points	39

=== Score overview ===
Opposition	Home score	Away score	Double
Air Force Central	3-1	1-0	Yes
Bangkok Glass	2-2	-	No
Bangkok United	-	3-2	
Buriram United	-	0-4	No
Chainat Hornbill	2-0	-	
Chiangrai United	1-1	3-0	No
Chonburi	-	1-1	No
Nakhon Ratchasima	-	1-0	
Navy	4-0	-	
Pattaya United	-	4-0	
Police Tero	2-2	-	No
Port	0-2	3-2	No
PT Prachuap	-	1-6	No
Ratchaburi Mitr Phol	2-2	-	No
Sukhothai	4-3	-	
Suphanburi	2-2	-	No
Ubon UMT United	1-0	-	

== Transfers ==
First Thai footballer's market is opening on 14 November 2017 to 5 February 2018
Second Thai footballer's market is opening on 11 June 2018 to 9 July 2018

=== In ===
Date	Pos.	Name	From	Ref
1 December 2017	MF	(Thailand) Thossawat Limwannasathian	(Thailand) Army United	
27 December 2017	FW	(Thailand) Chenrop Samphaodi	(Thailand) Police Tero	
1 January 2018	MF	(Thailand) Suradet Klankhum	(Thailand) Bangkok	
1 January 2018	FW	(Thailand) Suksan Mungpao	(Thailand) Udon Thani	
15 January 2018	FW	(Brazil) Jajá	(Belgium) Lokeren	
26 January 2017	DF	(Singapore) Baihakki Khaizan	(Singapore) Warriors	
29 June 2018	DF	(Thailand) Saringkan Promsupa	(Thailand) Rayong	
29 June 2018	DF	(Thailand) Chayapol Supma	(Thailand) Assumption United	
29 June 2018	MF	(Thailand) Reungyos Janchaichit	(Thailand) Udon Thani	

=== Out ===
Date	Pos.	Name	To	Ref
1 December 2017	MF	(Thailand) Peeradon Chamratsamee	(Thailand) Pattaya United	
16 December 2017	DF	(Thailand) Sakda Fai-in	(Thailand) Trat	
22 December 2017	MF	(Thailand) Wasan Samarnsin	(Thailand) Army United	
1 January 2018	DF	(Thailand) Suphanan Bureerat	(Thailand) Pattaya United	
5 January 2018	MF	(Thailand) Patiphan Pinsermsootsri	(Thailand) Chonburi	
5 January 2018	GK	(Thailand) Kawin Thamsatchanan	(Belgium) OH Leuven	
27 May 2018	FW	(Brazil) Leandro Assumpção	(Thailand) Nakhon Ratchasima	
30 May 2018	MF	(Thailand) Thossawat Limwannasathian	(Thailand) Bangkok United	
31 May 2018	MF	(Thailand) Ratchapol Nawanno	(Thailand) PT Prachuap	
3 June 2018	FW	(Thailand) Siroch Chatthong	(Thailand) PT Prachuap	
7 June 2018	MF	(Thailand) Kasidech Wettayawong	(Thailand) Suphanburi	

=== Loan in ===
Date from	Date to	Pos.	Name	From	Ref

=== Loan out ===
Date from	Date to	Pos.	Name	To	Ref
29 December 2017	30 November 2018	MF	(Thailand) Datsakorn Thonglao	(Thailand) Udon Thani	
31 December 2017	31 May 2018	MF	(Thailand) Wongsakorn Chaikultewin	(Thailand) Udon Thani	
5 January 2018	31 May 2018	DF	(Thailand) Weerawut Kayem	(Thailand) Udon Thani	
10 January 2018	30 November 2018	DF	(Thailand) Pitakpong Kulasuwan	(Thailand) Udon Thani	
13 January 2018	31 May 2018	FW	(Thailand) Kasidech Wettayawong	(Thailand) Udon Thani	
16 January 2017	30 November 2018	GK	(Thailand) Somporn Yos	(Thailand) PT Prachuap	
19 January 2018	1 May 2018	FW	(Brazil) Leandro Assumpção	(Thailand) Air Force Central	
1 February 2018	31 December 2018	FW	(Thailand) Teerasil Dangda	(Japan) Sanfrecce Hiroshima	
1 February 2018	31 December 2018	DF	(Thailand) Theerathon Bunmathan	(Japan) Vissel Kobe	
5 February 2018	31 May 2018	MF	(Thailand) Sundy Wongderree	(Thailand) Udon Thani	
5 February 2018	30 November 2018	MF	(Thailand) Isariya Marom	(Thailand) Udon Thani	
5 February 2018	30 November 2018	DF	(Singapore) Baihakki Khaizan	(Thailand) Udon Thani	
4 June 2018	31 May 2019	DF	(Thailand) Suksan Mungpao	(Thailand) Army United	
13 June 2018	30 November 2018	MF	(Thailand) Suradet Klankhum	(Thailand) Bangkok	
29 June 2018	30 November 2018	MF	(Thailand) Prakit Deeprom	(Thailand) Udon Thani	
