= 2016 SCG Muangthong United F.C. season =

SCG Muangthong United
2016 season
- Chairman: Pongsak Phol-Anan
- Manager: Totchtawan Sripan
- Stadium: SCG Stadium, Pak Kret, Nonthaburi, Thailand
- Thai League: 1st
- Thai FA Cup: Quarter-finals
- Thai League Cup: Champions Shared with Buriram United
- Kor Royal Cup: Runners-up
- AFC Champions League: Play-off round
- Top goalscorer: League: Cleiton Silva (27); All: Cleiton Silva (33)
Home colours	Away colours	Third colours

The 2016 season is SCG Muangthong United's eighth season in the Thai Premier League since 2009. The club enters the season as the Thai Premier League Champion, and will participate in the Thai League, FA Cup, League Cup, Kor Royal Cup, Toyota Premier Cup and the AFC Champions League.

== Foreign Players ==
Note: Flags indicate national team as defined under FIFA eligibility rules; some limited exceptions apply. Players may hold more than one non-FIFA nationality.

No.	Pos.	Nation	Player
4	DF	ESP	Mario Abrante
5	DF	JPN	Naoaki Aoyama
8	FW	ESP	Xisco Jiménez
9	FW	FRA	Michaël N'dri
23	FW	BRA	Cleiton Silva
24	FW	CIV	Yaya Soumahoro

== Kit ==
Manufacturer: Grand Sport Group, Main sponsor: Siam Cement, 2nd sponsor: Yamaha Corporation, 3rd sponsor: Singha, 4th sponsor: I-Mobile, 5th sponsor: Herbalife, 6th sponsor: Sponsor Beverage Brand, 7th sponsor: Coca-Cola

Home	Away	Third	Third(old version)

== Pre-season and friendlies ==
Date	Opponents	H / A	Result F–A	Scorer(s)
16 January 2016	K Cement Cambodia All Stars	A	3–4	Chaiyawat 22', Kasidech 25', Sarach 80'
23 January 2016	(Vietnam) Becamex Bình Dương	A	1–2	Júnior 30'
5 February 2016	Sisaket	H	2–0	Júnior 45' (pen.), Kittisak 51'

== Kor Royal Cup ==
Coke Charity Cup. It's a match between Buriram United the 2015 Toyota Thai Premier League's champions VS. SCG Muangthong United the 2015 Toyota Thai Premier League's runners-up at Suphachalasai Stadium, Bangkok, Thailand.

Date	Opponents	H / A	Result F–A	Scorer(s)
20 February 2016	Buriram United	N	1–3	Adisak 78'

== Thai League ==
Pos	Team	Pld	W	D	L	GF	GA	GD	Pts	Qualification or relegation
1	Muangthong United (C, Q)	31	26	2	3	73	24	+49	80	2017 AFC Champions League group stage
2	Bangkok United (Q)	31	23	6	2	71	36	+35	75	2017 AFC Champions League preliminary round 2
3	Bangkok Glass	31	18	3	10	62	41	+21	57	
4	Buriram United	30	15	10	5	55	38	+17	55	
5	Chonburi	31	14	9	8	52	33	+19	51	

Updated to match(es) played on 25 September 2016. Source: Thai League
Rules for classification: 1) points; 2) goal difference; 3) number of goals scored.
(C) Champions; (Q) Qualified for the phase indicated

Date	Opponents	H / A	Result F–A	Scorers	League position
5 March 2016	Nakhon Ratchasima Mazda	A	1–0	Cleiton 37'	8th
9 March 2016	Bangkok Glass	H	2–0	Cleiton (2) 54', 66'	3rd
12 March 2016	Ratchaburi Mitr Phol	H	3–0	Adisak 10', Teerasil 66', Peeradon 90+3'	1st
16 March 2016	BEC Tero Sasana	H	0–1		1st
30 March 2016	Bangkok United	H	2–3	Adisak 47', Cleiton 50'	5th
2 April 2016	Navy	A	4–0	Teerasil (3) 41', 56', 78' (pen.), Cleiton 89'	4th
23 April 2016	Sisaket	H	4–0	Cleiton 17', Adisak (2) 21', 43', Aoyama 71'	3rd
27 April 2016	Buriram United	A	3–0	Cleiton (2) 10',37', Adisak 16'	2nd
1 May 2016	Chonburi	H	1–0	Chanathip 18'	2nd
7 May 2016	Chiangrai United	A	3–0	Cleiton (3) 6', 13', 60'	2nd
11 May 2016	Suphanburi	H	1–0	Cleiton 38' (pen.)	1st
15 May 2016	Pattaya United	A	2–1	Adisak 23', N'dri 82'	1st
21 May 2016	Sukhothai	H	2–1	Cleiton (2) 47', 90+1'	1st
28 May 2016	BBCU	A	2–1	Cleiton 56', N'dri 90+1'	1st
12 June 2016	Chainat Hornbill	H	2–0	Teerasil 3', N'dri 24'	1st
19 June 2016	Army United	A	1–0	Chaiyawat 85'	1st
22 June 2016	Osotspa M-150 Samut Prakan	H	8–3	Cleiton (4) 17', 27', 53', 69', Adisak 30', Teerasil (2) 35', 57', Peerapat 80'	1st
25 June 2016	Nakhon Ratchasima Mazda	H	4–1	Theerathon 32', Abrante 45+2', Adisak (2) 54', 82'	1st
29 June 2016	Bangkok Glass	A	2–1	Teerasil 23', Cleiton 61'	1st
2 July 2016	Ratchaburi Mitr Phol	A	1–3	Cleiton 28'	1st
10 July 2016	Bangkok United	A	3–3	Chanathip 21', Adisak (2) 41', 68'	1st
16 July 2016	Navy	H	1–1	N'dri 63'	1st
20 July 2016	Sisaket	A	1–0	Teerasil 79'	1st
24 July 2016	Buriram United	H	3–2	Chanathip 45+2', Sarach 53', Cleiton 77'	1st
30 July 2016	Chonburi	A	3–0	Adisak (2) 1', 42', N'dri 19'	1st
7 August 2016	Chiangrai United	H	1–0	Adison 90+2'	1st
14 August 2016	Suphanburi	A	1–0	Adisak 46'	1st
20 August 2016	Pattaya NNK United (Note: In mid-2016, Pattaya United change the name to Pattaya NNK United due to their take sponsor.)	H	4–1	Xisco 11', Cleiton 15', Theerathon 45+1', Teerasil 57'	1st
11 September 2016	Sukhothai	A	1–0	Cleiton 28' (pen.)	1st
18 September 2016	BBCU	N (Note: 14 September 2016, Fans of SCG Muangthong United and fans of Port had clashed, so both can't use their home stadium while waiting for legal punishment.)	5–1	Xisco (2) 8', 72', Teerasil 51', Cleiton (2) 65', 70'	1st
24 September 2016	Chainat Hornbill	A	2–1	Xisco 37', Cleiton 85'	1st

== AFC Champions League ==
Date	Opponents	H / A	Result F–A	Scorers	Round
2 February 2016	(Malaysia) Johor Darul Ta'zim	H	0–0 (a.e.t.) (3–0p)		Preliminary round 2
9 February 2016	(China) Shanghai SIPG	A	0–3		Play-off round

== Thai FA Cup ==
Chang FA Cup

Date	Opponents	H / A	Result F–A	Scorers	Round
15 June 2016	Ayutthaya Warrior	A	4–1 (a.e.t.)	Cleiton 79', N'dri 105', Kuekkong 112' (o.g.), Teerasil 119'	Round of 64
13 July 2016	Pattaya NNK United	A	4–1 (a.e.t.)	Cleiton 54', Teerasil (2) 102', 113', N'dri 110'	Round of 32
3 August 2016	Buriram United	H	3–1	Adisak 26', Teerasil 37', Cleiton 64'	Round of 16
21 September 2016	Chonburi	N (Note: 14 September 2016, Fans of SCG Muangthong United and fans of Port had clashed, so both can't use their home stadium had suspended.)	0–3		Quarter-finals

== Thai League Cup ==
Toyota League Cup

Date	Opponents	H / A	Result F–A	Scorers	Round
9 April 2016	Pattani	A	1–1 (a.e.t.) (3–2p)	Atit 27'	Round of 64
8 June 2016	Nakhon Pathom United	A	2–0	Cleiton 13', Adisak 31'	Round of 32
6 July 2016	Ubon UMT United	A	2–1	Peeradon 32', N'dri 88' (pen.)	Round of 16
10 August 2016	Krabi	H	2–1 (a.e.t.)	Xisco 86', Cleiton 94'	Quarter-finals
17 August 2016	Port	A	2–1	Xisco 35', Teerasil 47'	Semi-finals 1st leg
14 September 2016	Port	H	1–1 (3–2 agg.)	Cleiton 71' (pen.)	Semi-finals 2nd leg
15 October 2016	Buriram United	N	Shared		Final

== Squad appearances statistics ==
No.	Pos.	Name	League	FA Cup	League Cup	Kor	Asia	Total
1	GK	(Thailand) Kawin Thamsatchanan (tc)	29	1	2	1	2	35
2	DF	(Thailand) Peerapat Notchaiya	24+2	3	4+1	1	2	34+3
3	DF	(Thailand) Theerathon Bunmathan	9+1	1	2+1	0	0	12+2
4	DF	(Spain) Mario Abrante	17+1	0	1	0	0	18+1
5	DF	(Japan) Naoaki Aoyama	17+1	2	3	1	2	25+1
6	MF	(Thailand) Sarach Yooyen	26	1+1	2+1	1	2	32+2
7	MF	(Thailand) Datsakorn Thonglao (c)	4+9	2	4	0	0	10+9
8	FW	(Spain) Xisco Jiménez	2+1	0	2	0	0	4+1
9	FW	(France) Michaël N'dri	7+15	3	3	0	0	13+15
10	FW	(Thailand) Teerasil Dangda (vc)	22+4	0+3	2	0	0+1	24+8
11	FW	(Thailand) Adisak Kraisorn	21+4	2	2+2	0+1	0	25+7
14	MF	(Thailand) Sorawit Panthong	0+1	0	0+2	0	0	0+3
15	MF	(Thailand) Seksit Srisai	0+5	2	3	0	0	5+5
17	MF	(Thailand) Tanaboon Kesarat	27	2	2	1	2	34
18	MF	(Thailand) Chanathip Songkrasin	25+2	0+1	0+3	1	2	28+6
19	DF	(Thailand) Tristan Do	29	4	3+2	0	0	36+2
21	MF	(Thailand) Wasan Samarnsin	0+1	0	0+1	0	0	0+2
23	FW	(Brazil) Cleiton Silva	27+1	3	2+1	1	2	35+2
24	FW	(Ivory Coast) Yaya Soumahoro	0	0	0	0	0	0
25	DF	(Thailand) Adison Promrak	7+1	0	1	0	0	8+1
26	DF	(Thailand) Suphan Thongsong	11+5	3	5	0+1	2	21+6
30	GK	(Thailand) Panupan Juheang	0	0	0	0	0	0
32	MF	(Thailand) Peeradon Chamratsamee	2+5	0+1	3	0	0+1	5+7
34	DF	(Thailand) Wattana Playnum	1+7	2	3+1	0	0	6+8
35	MF	(Thailand) Chaiyawat Buran	0+9	1+2	2	0	0	3+11
39	GK	(Thailand) Witsanusak Kaewruang	0	2	3	0	0	5
Out on loan
-	DF	(Thailand) Atit Daosawang	4	0	1	1	1	7
-	MF	(Thailand) Kasidech Wettayawong	0+5	0	1	0+1	0+2	1+8
-	DF	(Thailand) Suporn Peenagatapho	0	0	0	0	0+1	0+1
Left club during season
25	MF	(Thailand) Thitipan Puangchan	5+3	0	0	1	2	8+3
-	DF	(Brazil) Fabrício Silva Dornellas	0	0	0	1	0	1
38	GK	(Thailand) Ittikorn Karnsang	0	0	0	0	0	0
22	FW	(Thailand) Chananan Pombuppha	0	0	0	0	0+1	0+1

== Squad goals statistics ==
No.	Pos.	Name	League	FA Cup	League Cup	Kor	Asia	Total
1	GK	(Thailand) Kawin Thamsatchanan (tc)	0	0	0	0	0	0
2	DF	(Thailand) Peerapat Notchaiya	1	0	0	0	0	1
3	DF	(Thailand) Theerathon Bunmathan	2	0	0	0	0	2
4	DF	(Spain) Mario Abrante	1	0	0	0	0	1
5	DF	(Japan) Naoaki Aoyama	1	0	0	0	0	1
6	MF	(Thailand) Sarach Yooyen	1	0	0	0	0	1
7	MF	(Thailand) Datsakorn Thonglao (c)	0	0	0	0	0	0
8	FW	(Spain) Xisco Jiménez	4	0	2	0	0	6
9	FW	(France) Michaël N'dri	5	2	1	0	0	8
10	FW	(Thailand) Teerasil Dangda (vc)	11	4	1	0	0	16
11	FW	(Thailand) Adisak Kraisorn	14	1	1	1	0	17
14	MF	(Thailand) Sorawit Panthong	0	0	0	0	0	0
15	MF	(Thailand) Seksit Srisai	0	0	0	0	0	0
17	MF	(Thailand) Tanaboon Kesarat	0	0	0	0	0	0
18	MF	(Thailand) Chanathip Songkrasin	3	0	0	0	0	3
19	DF	(Thailand) Tristan Do	0	0	0	0	0	0
21	MF	(Thailand) Wasan Samarnsin	0	0	0	0	0	0
23	FW	(Brazil) Cleiton Silva	27	3	3	0	0	33
24	FW	(Ivory Coast) Yaya Soumahoro	0	0	0	0	0	0
25	DF	(Thailand) Adison Promrak	1	0	0	0	0	1
26	DF	(Thailand) Suphan Thongsong	0	0	0	0	0	0
30	GK	(Thailand) Panupan Juheang	0	0	0	0	0	0
32	MF	(Thailand) Peeradon Chamratsamee	1	0	1	0	0	2
34	DF	(Thailand) Wattana Playnum	0	0	0	0	0	0
35	MF	(Thailand) Chaiyawat Buran	1	0	0	0	0	1
39	GK	(Thailand) Witsanusak Kaewruang	0	0	0	0	0	0
Out on loan
-	DF	(Thailand) Atit Daosawang	0	0	1	0	0	1
-	MF	(Thailand) Kasidech Wettayawong	0	0	0	0	0	0
-	DF	(Thailand) Suporn Peenagatapho	0	0	0	0	0	0
Left club during season
25	MF	(Thailand) Thitipan Puangchan	0	0	0	0	0	0
-	DF	(Brazil) Fabrício Silva Dornellas	0	0	0	0	0	0
38	GK	(Thailand) Ittikorn Karnsang	0	0	0	0	0	0
22	FW	(Thailand) Chananan Pombuppha	0	0	0	0	0	0

== Transfers ==
First Thai footballer's market is opening on 27 December 2015, to 28 January 2016
Second Thai footballer's market is opening on 3 June 2016, to 30 June 2016

=== In ===
Date	Pos.	Name	From
14 January 2016	FW	(Brazil) Júnior Negrão	(Brazil) Tombense
22 January 2016	DF	(Brazil) Fabrício Silva Dornellas	(Brazil) Bragantino
18 February 2016	FW	(Thailand) Adisak Kraisorn	(Thailand) BEC Tero Sasana
25 February 2016	DF	(Thailand) Tristan Do	(Thailand) BEC Tero Sasana
6 March 2016	DF	(Spain) Mario Abrante	(Spain) Real Zaragoza
9 March 2016	FW	(France) Michaël N'dri	(United Arab Emirates) Al-Shaab
13 May 2016	DF	(Thailand) Theerathon Bunmathan	(Thailand) Buriram United
21 June 2016	MF	(Ivory Coast) Yaya Soumahoro	(Belgium) Sint-Truidense
24 June 2016	DF	(Thailand) Adison Promrak	(Thailand) BEC Tero Sasana
24 June 2016	DF	(Thailand) Peerapat Notchaiya	(Thailand) BEC Tero Sasana
24 June 2016	MF	(Thailand) Tanaboon Kesarat	(Thailand) BEC Tero Sasana
24 June 2016	MF	(Thailand) Chanathip Songkrasin	(Thailand) BEC Tero Sasana
15 July 2016	FW	(Spain) Xisco Jiménez	(Spain) Córdoba

=== Out ===
Date	Pos.	Name	To
4 January 2016	MF	(Thailand) Sarawut Masuk	(Thailand) Bangkok Glass
4 January 2016	MF	(North Macedonia) Mario Gjurovski	(Thailand) Bangkok United
5 January 2016	GK	(Thailand) Kampol Pathom-attakul	(Thailand) Nakhon Ratchasima Mazda
14 January 2016	DF	(South Korea) Kim Dong-jin	(South Korea) Seoul E-Land
16 February 2016	MF	(Thailand) Anuwat Inyin	(Thailand) Pattaya United
16 February 2016	MF	(Thailand) Sivakorn Tiatrakul	(Thailand) BEC Tero Sasana
16 February 2016	DF	(Thailand) Suporn Peenagatapho	(Thailand) BEC Tero Sasana
16 February 2016	DF	(Thailand) Sarawut Kanlayanabandit	(Thailand) BEC Tero Sasana
16 February 2016	MF	(Thailand) Phitiwat Sukjitthammakul	(Thailand) BEC Tero Sasana
27 February 2016	DF	(Thailand) Piyaphon Phanichakul	(Thailand) Chiangrai United
27 February 2016	DF	(Thailand) Supravee Miprathang	(Thailand) Pattaya United
27 February 2016	FW	(Thailand) Chayawat Srinawong	(Thailand) Pattaya United
27 February 2016	MF	(Thailand) Woranat Thongkruea	(Thailand) Pattaya United
27 February 2016	MF	(Thailand) Pathompol Charoenrattanapirom	(Thailand) Pattaya United
22 May 2016	MF	(Thailand) Thitipan Puangchan	(Thailand) Chiangrai United
25 June 2016	FW	(Brazil) Júnior Negrão	(Thailand) Pattaya United
4 July 2016	DF	(Brazil) Fabrício Silva Dornellas	(Romania) FC Astra Giurgiu
15 July 2016	GK	(Thailand) Ittikorn Karnsang	(Thailand) Phrae United
15 July 2016	FW	(Thailand) Chananan Pombuppha	(Thailand) Suphanburi

=== Loan in ===
Date from	Date to	Pos.	Name	From
26 January 2016	24 June 2016	MF	(Thailand) Chanathip Songkrasin	(Thailand) BEC Tero Sasana
26 January 2016	24 June 2016	DF	(Thailand) Peerapat Notchaiya	(Thailand) BEC Tero Sasana
26 January 2016	24 June 2016	MF	(Thailand) Tanaboon Kesarat	(Thailand) BEC Tero Sasana

=== Loan out ===
Date from	Date to	Pos.	Name	To
23 December 2015	31 December 2016	MF	(Thailand) Sanukran Thinjom	(Thailand) Army United
23 December 2015	31 December 2016	DF	(Thailand) Suphanan Bureerat	(Thailand) Pattaya United
18 February 2016	15 July 2016	FW	(Thailand) Chananan Pombuppha	(Thailand) BEC Tero Sasana
18 February 2016	31 December 2016	FW	(Thailand) Chainarong Tathong	(Thailand) BEC Tero Sasana
18 February 2016	31 December 2016	DF	(Thailand) Suriya Singmui	(Thailand) BEC Tero Sasana
4 March 2016	25 June 2016	FW	(Brazil) Júnior Negrão	(Thailand) Pattaya United
4 March 2016	31 December 2016	MF	(Thailand) Wongsakorn Chaikultewin	(Thailand) Pattaya United
4 March 2016	31 December 2016	DF	(Thailand) Satsanapong Wattayuchutikul	(Thailand) Pattaya United
4 March 2016	31 December 2016	GK	(Thailand) Pattara Piyapatrakitti	(Thailand) Pattaya United
3 June 2016	31 December 2016	MF	(Thailand) Kasidech Wettayawong	(Thailand) Nakhon Ratchasima Mazda
4 June 2016	31 December 2016	MF	(Thailand) Atit Daosawang	(Thailand) Port
