= 2016 BEC Tero Sasana F.C. season =

BEC Tero Sasana
2016 season
- Manager: Surapong Kongthep
- Stadium: 72nd Anniversary Stadium
- Thai League T1: 9th
- Thai FA Cup: ?
- Thai League Cup: Round of 32
- Top goalscorer: League: Milan Bubalo (4); All: Milan Bubalo (5)

The 2016 season was BEC Tero Sasana's 20th season in the Thai League T1.

== Players ==
=== First team squad ===
Note: Flags indicate national team as defined under FIFA eligibility rules; some limited exceptions apply. Players may hold more than one non-FIFA nationality.

| No. | Pos. | Nation | Player |
|---|---|---|---|
| 1 | GK | THA | Prasit Padungchok |
| 3 | DF | THA | Suporn Peenagatapho |
| 4 | DF | THA | Sarawut Kanlayanabandit |
| 5 | DF | THA | Adison Promrak (Vice-captain) |
| 6 | DF | SRB | Sreten Sretenović |
| 7 | MF | THA | Wichan Nantasri |
| 8 | MF | KOR | Kim Jung-Woo |
| 11 | DF | THA | Apichet Puttan (Captain) |
| 13 | MF | THA | Pitakpong Kulasuwan |
| 14 | FW | THA | Jaturong Pimkoon |
| 15 | DF | THA | Adisak Waenlor |
| 16 | MF | THA | Phitiwat Sukjitthammakul |
| 18 | GK | THA | Putthipong Promlee |
| 20 | MF | THA | Sivakorn Tiatrakul |

| No. | Pos. | Nation | Player |
|---|---|---|---|
| 21 | MF | THA | Teeraphol Yoryoei |
| 22 | FW | THA | Chananan Pombuppha (on loan from Muangthong United) |
| 23 | FW | SRB | Milan Bubalo |
| 25 | MF | THA | Chayaphat Kitpongsrithada |
| 26 | MF | THA | Sitthichok Tassanai |
| 29 | FW | THA | Chenrop Samphaodi |
| 30 | DF | THA | Suriya Singmui (on loan from Muangthong United) |
| 31 | FW | THA | Chainarong Tathong (on loan from Muangthong United) |
| 32 | MF | SRB | Miloš Bosančić |
| 33 | MF | THA | Jaturong Chaiyarat |
| 34 | MF | THA | Thammarat Sangyusuk |
| 35 | FW | THA | Ronnachai Pongputtha |
| 40 | GK | THA | Somporn Yos |

=== Out on loan ===
Note: Flags indicate national team as defined under FIFA eligibility rules; some limited exceptions apply. Players may hold more than one non-FIFA nationality.

| No. | Pos. | Nation | Player |
|---|---|---|---|
| — | DF | THA | Peerapat Notechaiya (to Muangthong United) |
| — | DF | GHA | Isaac Honny (to Air Force Central) |
| — | MF | THA | Ekkachai Rittipan (to Chiangrai United) |
| — | GK | THA | Todsaporn Sri-reung (to Pattaya United) |

| No. | Pos. | Nation | Player |
|---|---|---|---|
| — | MF | THA | Tanaboon Kesarat (to Muangthong United) |
| — | MF | THA | Chanathip Songkrasin (to Muangthong United) |
| — | FW | LBN | Soony Saad (to Pattaya United) |

== Thai Premier League ==
Toyota Thai Premier League

| Date | Opponents | H / A | Result F–A | Scorers | League position |
|---|---|---|---|---|---|
| 5 March 2016 | Army United | H | 1–2 | Milan 20' | 12th |
| 9 March 2016 | Osotspa Samut Prakan | A | 3–2 | Milan 10' , Sivakorn 54' , 66' | 7th |
| 13 March 2016 | Nakhon Ratchasima | A | 0–1 | | 12th |
| 16 March 2016 | Muangthong United | A | 1–0 | Sivakorn 59' | 8th |
| 30 March 2016 | Ratchaburi Mitr Phol | H | 0–4 | | 13th |
| 3 April 2016 | Bangkok Glass | A | 1–5 | Sivakorn 32' | 13th |
| 24 April 2016 | Navy | H | 1–0 | Pitakpong 74' | 11th |
| 27 April 2016 | Bangkok United | A | 0–3 | | 11th |
| 1 May 2016 | Sisaket | H | 2–1 | Milan 56' , Chenrop 90' | 11th |
| 8 May 2016 | Chonburi | A | 0–1 | | 12th |
| 11 May 2016 | Pattaya United | H | 1–2 | Milan 62' | 12th |
| 15 May 2016 | Suphanburi | A | 0–0 | | 13th |
| 21 May 2016 | Chiangrai United | H | 1–2 | Chananan 28' | 14th |
| 28 May 2016 | Sukhothai | A | – | | |

== Thai League Cup ==
Toyota League Cup

| Date | Opponents | H / A | Result F–A | Scorers | Round |
|---|---|---|---|---|---|
| 9 April 2016 | Assumption United | A | 2–1 (a.e.t.) | Miloš 90+1' , Milan 102' | Round of 64 |
| 8 June 2016 | Chanthaburi | A | | | Round of 32 |
