= Kampot Cement =

Cambodian cement producer

Kampot Cement Co. Ltd. is the largest cement producer in Cambodia. It was established in 2005 as a 92.5:7.5 joint venture between Siam Cement and the Khaou Chuly Group, Cambodia's top construction and engineering firm.

Its cement production facility in Kampot Province opened in February 2008 and has a production capacity of 950.000 tons of cement per year.
