= Maximilian Steinbauer =

Footballer (born 2001)

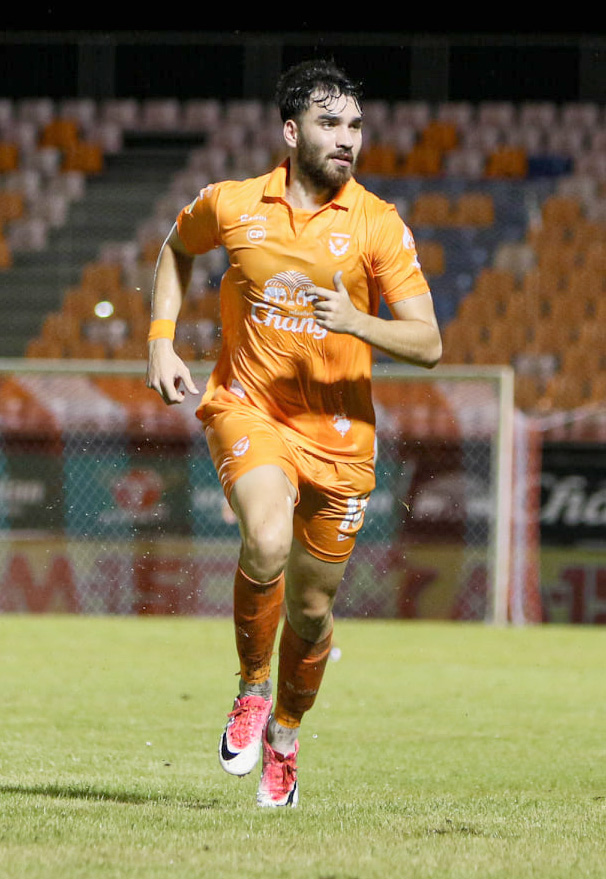
- Steinbauer playing for Sukhothai in 2021

Personal information
- Date of birth: 29 April 2001 (age 25)
- Place of birth: Berlin, Germany
- Height: 1.86 m (6 ft 1 in)
- Positions: Right-back; centre-back

Youth career
- 2016–2018: Union Berlin
- 2019–2020: Viktoria Berlin

Senior career*
Years	Team	Apps	(Gls)
2020	Tennis Borussia Berlin	8	(0)
2021	Muangthong United	0	(0)
2021–2023	Sukhothai	34	(6)

International career^{‡}
2022–2023	Thailand U23	3	(0)
- * Club domestic league appearances and goals as of 12 May 2023 (UTC) ‡ National team caps and goals as of 19 September 2023

Maximilian Steinbauer (Thai: แม็กซิมิเลียน ชไตน์เบาเออร์; born 29 April 2001) is a professional footballer who recently played as a right-back or a centre-back for Thai League 1 club Sukhothai. Born in Germany, he plays for the Thailand U23.

== Club career ==
=== Muangthong United ===
Before the second half of 2020–21, Steinbauer signed for Thai top flight side Muangthong United.

=== Sukhothai ===
In 2021, he signed for Sukhothai in the Thai second tier, helping them earn promotion to the Thai top flight.

== International career ==
Steinbauer is eligible to represent Thailand internationally through his mother.
