= Isariya Marom =

Thai footballer (born 1995)

Personal information
- Full name: Isariya Marom
- Date of birth: 18 December 1995 (age 30)
- Place of birth: Nong Bua Lamphu, Thailand
- Height: 1.75 m (5 ft 9 in)
- Positions: Left winger; left back

Team information
- Current team: Trat
- Number: 99

Youth career
- 2013–2014: Muangthong United

Senior career*
Years	Team	Apps	(Gls)
2015–2018	Muangthong United	0	(0)
2015	→ Nakhon Nayok (loan)	11	(2)
2015	→ Nongbua Pitchaya (loan)	8	(1)
2016	→ Phrae United (loan)	19	(4)
2017	→ BEC Tero Sasana (loan)	9	(0)
2017	→ Udon Thani (loan)	9	(1)
2018	→ Udon Thani (loan)	12	(2)
2019	Udon Thani	19	(0)
2020–2021	Nongbua Pitchaya	9	(1)
2021–	Trat	52	(1)

International career
2013–2014	Thailand U19	5	(2)
- * Club domestic league appearances and goals as of 13 November 2022

Isariya Marom (Thai: อิสริยะ มารมย์), born December 18, 1995), or simply known as Teng (Thai: เติ้ง), is a Thai professional footballer who plays as a left winger or left back for Thai League 2 club Trat.

== Honour ==
Nongbua Pitchaya

- Thai League 2 Champions : 2020–21
