= Sardor Mirzaev =

Uzbekistani footballer

Sardor Mirzayev
Personal information
- Full name: Sardor Mirzayev
- Date of birth: 21 March 1991 (age 35)
- Place of birth: Fergana, Uzbekistan
- Height: 1.78 m (5 ft 10 in)
- Position: Attacking midfielder

Team information
- Current team: Lokomotiv Tashkent
- Number: 17

Senior career*
| Years | Team | Apps | (Gls) |
| 2009–2013 | Neftchi FK | 75 | (6) |
| 2014 | Lokomotiv Tashkent | 11 | (0) |
| 2014 | → Neftchi FK (loan) | 9 | (0) |
| 2015–2020 | Lokomotiv Tashkent | 120 | (27) |
| 2020–2023 | Muangthong United | 80 | (28) |
| 2023–2025 | AGMK | 3 | (0) |
| 2026– | Lokomotiv Tashkent | 11 | (3) |

International career^{‡}
| 2009 | Uzbekistan U20 | 6 | (1) |
| 2012 | Uzbekistan U21 | 4 | (1) |
| 2013 | Uzbekistan U23 | 4 | (0) |
| 2015–2019 | Uzbekistan | 15 | (1) |
- * Club domestic league appearances and goals as of 29 July 2026 ‡ National team caps and goals as of 24 March 2019

Sardor Mirzaev (Uzbek Cyrillic: Сардор Мирзаев; born 21 March 1991) is an Uzbek professional footballer who plays as an attacking midfielder for Lokomotiv Tashkent.

== Club career ==
Mirzayev played for Neftchi FK for four years, until transferring to Lokomotiv Tashkent FK, where he was promptly loaned out to Neftchi FK for a further season. On his return to Lokomotiv Tashkent, he scored his first AFC Champions League goal in Tashkent's 3–1 away loss to Saudi Arabian club Al-Hilal FC.

On 11 December 2020, it was confirmed that Mirzayev would join the Thai league club Muangthong United for the 2020 season.

== International career ==
Mirzayev has represented Uzbekistan at U-20s, U-21s, and U-23s ages. He was selected to play for the Uzbekistan U-20s during the 2009 FIFA U-20 World Cup in Egypt. This saw Uzbekistan finish third in their group behind Ghana and Uruguay. however finished above England on goal difference.

He was also selected in the U23s to participate in the 2013 AFC U-22 Championship in which Uzbekistan finish 3rd in the group, and failed to reach the knock out stages. Mirzayev made his official debut for the national team on 29 March 2015 in a friendly against South Korea when he was called up for the first time in national team.
