= Saharat Kanyaroj =

Thai footballer (born 1994)

Personal information
- Full name: Saharat Kanyaroj
- Date of birth: 9 June 1994 (age 32)
- Place of birth: Lamphun, Thailand
- Height: 1.70 m (5 ft 7 in)
- Positions: Attacking midfielder; winger

Team information
- Current team: PT Prachuap
- Number: 8

Youth career
- 2010: Lamphun Warrior

Senior career*
Years	Team	Apps	(Gls)
2011–2014	Lamphun Warrior	43	(11)
2015–2016	Chiangrai United	32	(3)
2016–2019	PTT Rayong	53	(7)
2020–2023	Muangthong United	29	(2)
2021–2022	→ Chiangmai United (loan)	24	(3)
2023	→ Nakhon Ratchasima (loan)	11	(2)
2023–	PT Prachuap	70	(11)

International career
2015–2016	Thailand U23	1	(0)
- * Club domestic league appearances and goals as of 01:58, 4 November 2026 (UTC)

Saharat Kanyaroj (Thai: สหรัฐ กันยะโรจน์, born June 9, 1994), simply known as Farm (Thai: ฟาร์ม), is a Thai professional footballer who plays as an attacking midfielder or a winger for Thai League 1 club PT Prachuap.

== International career ==
In 2016 Saharat was selected in Thailand U23 squad for 2016 AFC U-23 Championship in Qatar.
