= Suradet Klankhum =

Thai footballer (born 1996)

Personal information
- Full name: Suradet Klankhum
- Date of birth: 2 July 1996 (age 30)
- Place of birth: Sisaket, Thailand
- Height: 1.75 m (5 ft 9 in)
- Positions: Left winger; left back

Team information
- Current team: Assumption United
- Number: 31

Youth career
- 2010–2014: Assumption Thonburi

Senior career*
Years	Team	Apps	(Gls)
2015–2021	Muangthong United	0	(0)
2015–2016	→ Assumption United (loan)	21	(2)
2016	→ BEC Tero Sasana (loan)	2	(0)
2017	→ Pattaya United (loan)	0	(0)
2017	→ Bangkok (loan)	14	(1)
2018	→ Bangkok (loan)		
2020	→ Udon Thani (loan)	3	(0)
2021–	Assumption United	0	(0)

International career
2016–	Thailand U23	2	(0)
- * Club domestic league appearances and goals

Suradet Klankhum (Thai: สุรเดช กลั่นขำ) simply known as Art (Thai: อาร์ท), is a Thai professional footballer who plays as a left winger.
