= Suksan Mungpao =

Thai footballer

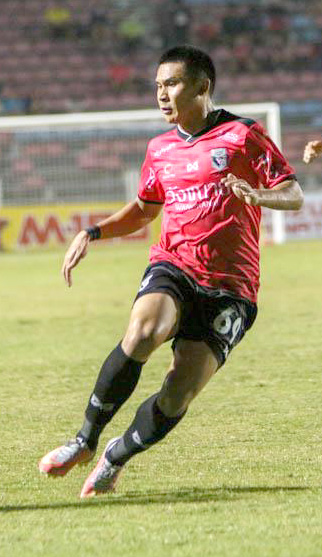

Personal information
- Full name: Suksan Mungpao
- Date of birth: 5 March 1997 (age 29)
- Place of birth: Thailand
- Height: 1.76 m (5 ft 9 1/2 in)
- Positions: Winger; attacking midfielder

Team information
- Current team: Chattrakan City
- Number: 3

Youth career
- 2013–2015: Assumption College Sriracha

Senior career*
Years	Team	Apps	(Gls)
2016–2019	Muangthong United	4	(0)
2016	→ Pattaya United (loan)	0	(0)
2016	→ Phrae United (loan)	6	(1)
2017	→ Udon Thani (loan)	5	(0)
2018–2019	→ Army United (loan)	12	(0)
2019	→ Ayutthaya United (loan)	11	(1)
2020–2022	Chainat Hornbill	43	(0)
2022	Sukhothai	2	(0)
2023	Phrae United	13	(0)
2023–2024	Phitsanulok	17	(0)
2024–2025	Lopburi City	20	(1)
2025	Chanthaburi	1	(0)
2026–	Chattrakan City	0	(0)

International career^{‡}
2015–2016	Thailand U19	15	(8)
2018	Thailand U21	2	(0)
2018–2020	Thailand U23	1	(0)
- * Club domestic league appearances and goals as of 3 March 2026 ‡ National team caps and goals as of 3 August 2020

Suksan Mungpao (Thai: สุขสันต์ มุ่งเป้า; born 5 March 1997) is a Thai professional footballer who plays as an attacking midfielder and winger for Thai League 3 club Chattrakan City.

Suksan Mungpao was a member of the Thailand team that won the 2015 AFF U-19 Youth Championship.

== Honours ==
=== International ===
Thailand U-19

- AFF U-19 Youth Championship: 2015
