= Wattanakorn Sawatlakhorn =

Thai footballer

Personal information
- Full name: Wattanakorn Sawatlakhorn
- Date of birth: 23 May 1998 (age 28)
- Place of birth: Khon Kaen, Thailand
- Height: 1.78 m (5 ft 10 in)
- Position: Left back

Team information
- Current team: Sukhothai
- Number: 3

Youth career
- 2013–2017: Muangthong United

Senior career*
Years	Team	Apps	(Gls)
2017–2022	Muangthong United	58	(0)
2017	→ Udon Thani (loan)	11	(0)
2018	→ Bangkok (loan)	24	(2)
2022–2024	BG Pathum United	26	(0)
2024–2025	Uthai Thani	5	(0)
2025–2026	Ayutthaya United	4	(0)
2026	Muangthong United	8	(0)
2026–	Sukhothai	0	(0)
- * Club domestic league appearances and goals as of 01:18, 27 May 2026 (UTC)

Wattanakorn Sawatlakhorn (Thai: วัฒนากรณ์ สวัสดิ์ละคร; born 23 May 1998) is a Thai professional footballer who plays as a left back for Thai League 1 club Sukhothai.

== Honours ==
=== Club ===
==== BG Pathum United ====
- Thai League Cup: 2023–24
