= Petcharat Chotipala =

Thai footballer (born 1997)

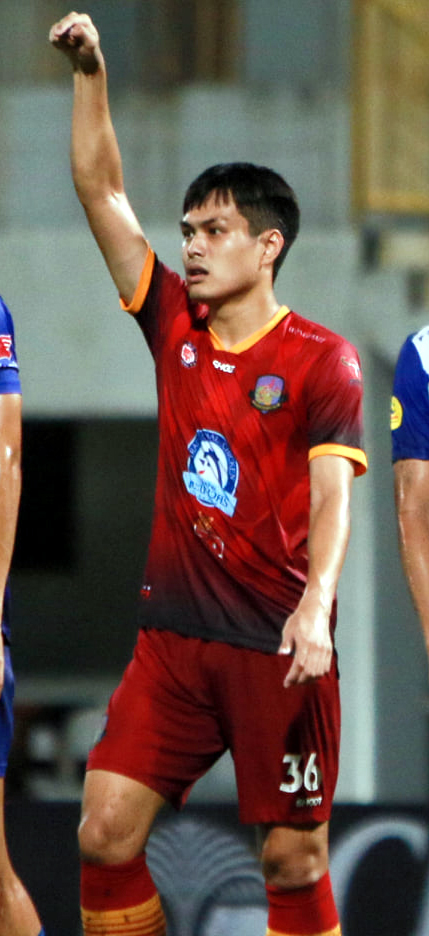
- Petcharat Chotipala playing for Kasetsart.

Personal information
- Full name: Petcharat Chotipala
- Date of birth: 20 December 1997 (age 28)
- Place of birth: Bangkok, Thailand
- Height: 1.77 m (5 ft 10 in)
- Position: Right-back

Team information
- Current team: Nakhon Si United
- Number: 36

Youth career
- 2010–2012: Brentwood School
- 2012–2018: Muangthong United

Senior career*
Years	Team	Apps	(Gls)
2018–2022	Muangthong United	6	(0)
2018–2019	→ Chamchuri United (loan)	20	(0)
2020–2022	→ Kasetsart (loan)	31	(1)
2022	→ PT Prachuap (loan)	8	(0)
2023	PT Prachuap	1	(0)
2023	→ Nakhon Si United (loan)	12	(0)
2024–	Nakhon Si United	44	(2)
- * Club domestic league appearances and goals as of 3 January 2026

Petcharat Chotipala (Thai: เพชรรัตน์ โชติปาละ; born 20 December 1997), is a Thai professional footballer who plays as a right-back for Thai League 2 club Nakhon Si United.
