= Pitakpong Kulasuwan =

Thai footballer (born 1988)

Personal information
- Full name: Pitakpong Kulasuwan
- Date of birth: 11 February 1988 (age 38)
- Place of birth: Roi Et, Thailand
- Height: 1.75 m (5 ft 9 in)
- Position: Right back

Youth career
- 2006–2009: IPE Mahasarakham

Senior career*
Years	Team	Apps	(Gls)
2010–2012	Mahasarakham	48	(6)
2013–2014	Khon Kaen	34	(3)
2015–2016	BEC Tero Sasana	38	(1)
2017	Muangthong United	9	(0)
2018	→ Udon Thani (loan)	10	(0)
2019–2021	Police Tero	19	(0)
2021–2022	Mahasarakham	21	(0)
Total		179	(10)
- * Club domestic league appearances and goals as of 03:31, 5 August 2025 (UTC)

Pitakpong Kulasuwan (Thai: พิทักษ์พงษ์ กุลสุวรรณ), is a Thai retired professional footballer who plays as a right back.

== Honours ==
=== Club ===
Muangthong United

- Thai League Cup (1): 2017
- Thailand Champions Cup (1): 2017
- Mekong Club Championship (1): 2017
