= Phumin Kaewta =

Thai footballer (born 1995)

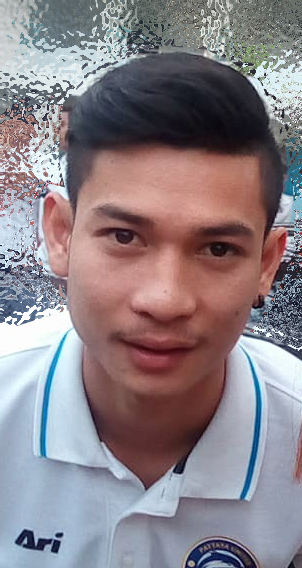

Personal information
- Full name: Phumin Kaewta
- Date of birth: 12 March 1995 (age 31)
- Place of birth: Bangkok, Thailand
- Height: 1.68 m (5 ft 6 in)
- Position: Winger

Team information
- Current team: Mahasarakham SBT
- Number: 16

Youth career
- 2010–2014: Muangthong United

Senior career*
Years	Team	Apps	(Gls)
2015–2016	Muangthong United	0	(0)
2016–2018	Pattaya United	29	(1)
2019–2020	Samut Prakan City	31	(4)
2020–2024	Muangthong United	15	(1)
2021	→ PT Prachuap (loan)	13	(3)
2024	Suphanburi	13	(1)
2025–	Mahasarakham SBT	1	(0)
- * Club domestic league appearances and goals as of 12:48, 1 January 2025 (UTC)

Phumin Kaewta (Thai: ภูมินทร์ แก้วตา, born 12 March 1995) is a Thai professional footballer who plays as a winger for Thai League 2 club Mahasarakham SBT.
