= Lucas Rocha (footballer, born 1995) =

Brazilian footballer

Personal information
- Full name: Lucas da Silva Rocha
- Date of birth: 19 June 1995 (age 31)
- Place of birth: Ilha das Flores, Brazil
- Height: 1.85 m (6 ft 1 in)
- Position: Centre back

Team information
- Current team: Volta Redonda

Youth career
- 2010–2014: Confiança
- 2013: → Vitória (loan)
- 2014–2015: Palmeiras
- 2015: → Ceará (loan)

Senior career*
Years	Team	Apps	(Gls)
2016	Confiança	0	(0)
2016	Bragantino	14	(1)
2017–2019	Boavista	0	(0)
2017	→ Vasco da Gama (loan)	2	(0)
2018	→ Atlético Goianiense (loan)	25	(1)
2020–2023	Muangthong United	73	(4)
2023	Atlético Goianiense	0	(0)
2024	Inter de Limeira	5	(0)
2025	EC Água Santa	3	(0)
2025	Aparecidense	11	(0)
2026	Treze	9	(0)
2026–	Volta Redonda	11	(1)
- * Club domestic league appearances and goals as of 11 November 2026

Lucas da Silva Rocha (born 19 June 1995), known as Lucas Rocha, is a Brazilian footballer who plays as a centre back for Volta Redonda.

== Career statistics ==
As of 4 May 2019

Club	Season	League			State League		Cup		Continental		Other		Total	
Club	Season	Division	Apps	Goals	Apps	Goals	Apps	Goals	Apps	Goals	Apps	Goals	Apps	Goals
Confiança	2016	Série C	0	0	14	2	2	0	—		5 (Note: All appearance(s) in Copa do Nordeste)	0	21	2
Bragantino	2016	Série B	14	1	—		—		—		6 (Note: All appearance(s) in Copa Paulista)	1	20	2
Boavista	2017	Série D	—		13	0	3	1	—		—		16	1
Vasco da Gama	2017	Série A	2	0	—		—		—		—		2	0
Atlético Goianiense	2018	Série B	23	0	8	1	0	0	—		—		31	1
Atlético Goianiense	2019	Série B	2	1	15	1	4	0	—		—		21	2
Atlético Goianiense	Subtotal		25	1	23	2	4	0	—		—		52	3
Career total			41	2	50	4	9	1	0	0	11	1	111	8
