= Atikun Mheetuam =

Thai footballer (born 1995)

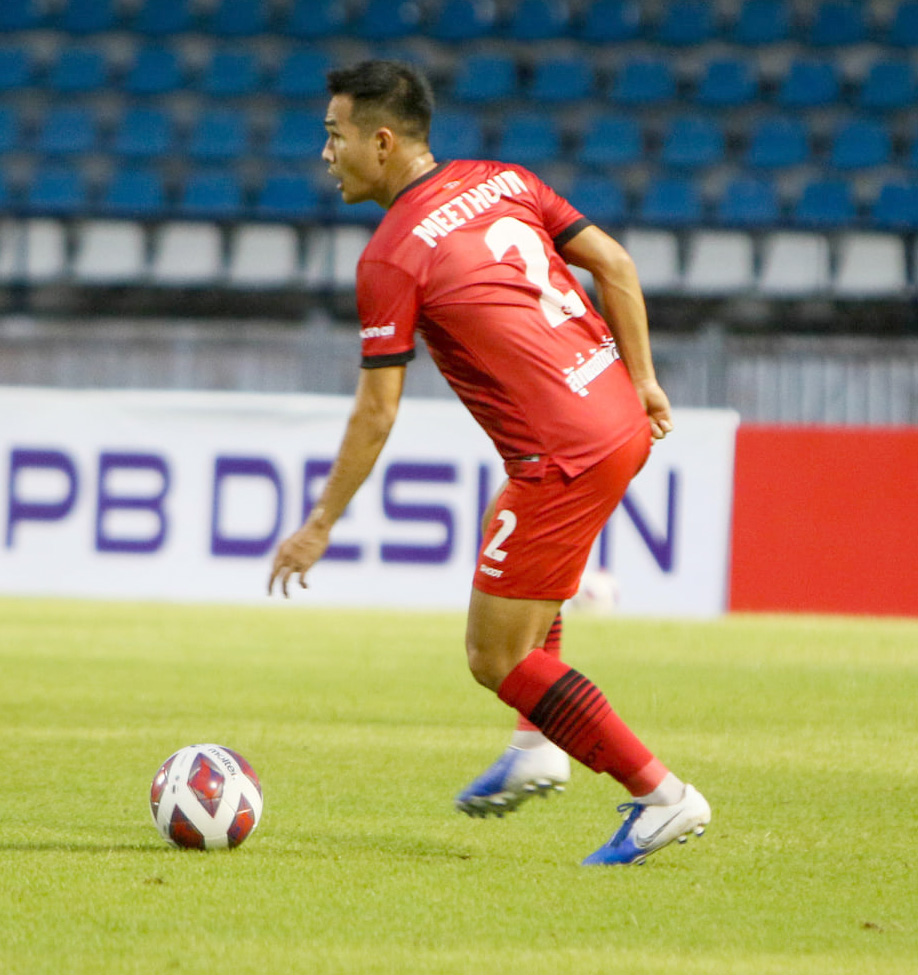

Personal information
- Full name: Atikun Mheetuam
- Date of birth: 18 January 1995 (age 31)
- Place of birth: Bangkok, Thailand
- Position: Defensive midfielder

Team information
- Current team: Uthai Thani
- Number: 92

Youth career
- 2012–2016: Muangthong United

Senior career*
Years	Team	Apps	(Gls)
2016–2022	Muangthong United	6	(0)
2016–2017	→ BEC Tero Sasana (loan)	10	(0)
2018–2019	→ Bangkok (loan)	19	(2)
2020–2021	→ Trat (loan)	29	(3)
2022–2025	Chiangrai United	85	(0)
2025–	Uthai Thani	13	(0)
- * Club domestic league appearances and goals as of 5 March 2026

Atikun Mheetuam (อติคุณ มีท้วม, born January 18, 1995) is a Thai professional footballer who plays as a defensive midfielder for Thai League 1 club Uthai Thani.
