= Sarawut Kanlayanabandit =

Thai footballer (born 1991)

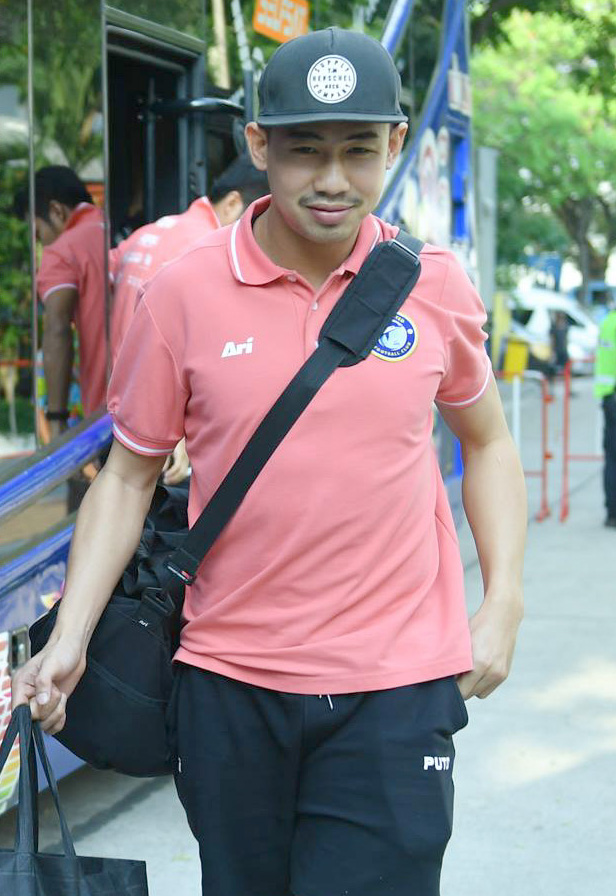

Personal information
- Full name: Sarawut Kanlayanabandit
- Date of birth: 27 May 1991 (age 35)
- Place of birth: Loei, Thailand
- Height: 1.85 m (6 ft 1 in)
- Position: Centre-back

Team information
- Current team: Sukhothai
- Number: 22

Youth career
- 2009: Loei City

Senior career*
Years	Team	Apps	(Gls)
2009–2010	Loei City	15	(0)
2010	Raj-Vithi	18	(1)
2011	Kasetsart	22	(0)
2012–2013	TTM Customs	31	(2)
2013–2015	Muangthong United	5	(0)
2014	→ Air Force Central (loan)	28	(4)
2016	BEC Tero Sasana	15	(3)
2017–2018	Pattaya United	46	(1)
2019–2020	Samut Prakan City	21	(1)
2020–2022	Port	0	(0)
2021	→ Muangthong United (loan)	5	(0)
2021–2022	→ Muang Loei United (loan)	10	(1)
2022–	Sukhothai	63	(0)

International career
2013–2014	Thailand U23	6	(0)
2014	Thailand	2	(0)
- * Club domestic league appearances and goals as of 12 November 2023

Sarawut Kanlayanabandit (Thai: สราวุธ กัลยาณบัณฑิต, born 27 May 1991), is a Thai professional footballer who plays as a centre-back.

== International career ==
He represented Thailand U23 in the 2014 Asian Games.

=== International ===
As of 12 November 2015

National team	Year	Apps	Goals
Thailand	2014	2	0
Thailand	Total	2	0

== Honours ==
=== Club ===
Loei City

- Regional League North-East Division
  - Champions (1) : 2009

Kasetsart University

- Regional League Bangkok Area Division
  - Champions (1) : 2011
