= Sundy Wongderree =

Thai footballer (born 1998)

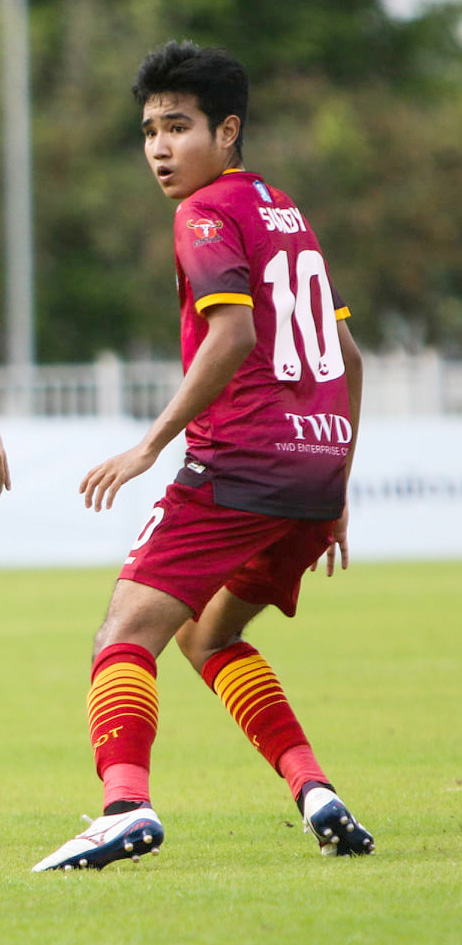

Personal information
- Full name: Sundy Wongderree
- Date of birth: 27 May 1998 (age 28)
- Place of birth: Bangkok, Thailand
- Height: 1.69 m (5 ft 6 1/2 in)
- Position: Attacking midfielder

Youth career
- 2012–2017: Muangthong United

Senior career*
| Years | Team | Apps | (Gls) |
| 2017–2023 | Muangthong United | 2 | (1) |
| 2017–2018 | → Udon Thani (loan) | 14 | (1) |
| 2021 | → Trat (loan) | 10 | (0) |
| 2021–2022 | → Kasetsart (loan) | 24 | (1) |
| 2022–2024 | → Kasem Bundit University (loan) | 17 | (1) |
| 2024 | → Kasem Bundit University (loan) | 12 | (3) |
| 2024–2025 | Kasem Bundit University | 18 | (4) |
- * Club domestic league appearances and goals as of 2 February 2025

Sundy Wongderree (Thai: ซันดี้ วงษ์เดอรี, born May 27, 1998), is a Thai professional footballer who plays as an attacking midfielder.
