= Patcharapol Intanee =

Thai footballer (born 1998)

Personal information
- Full name: Patcharapol Intanee
- Date of birth: 12 October 1998 (age 28)
- Place of birth: Nakhon Pathom, Thailand
- Height: 1.77 m (5 ft 9 1/2 in)
- Positions: Defensive midfielder; centre back

Team information
- Current team: Police Tero
- Number: 24

Youth career
- 2014–2017: Muangthong United

Senior career*
Years	Team	Apps	(Gls)
2017–2023	Muangthong United	29	(0)
2017	→ Udon Thani (loan)	3	(0)
2022	→ Suphanburi (loan)	8	(0)
2022–2023	→ Nakhon Ratchasima (loan)	25	(1)
2023–2025	Lamphun Warriors	27	(0)
2025–2026	Kasetsart	11	(0)
2026–	Police Tero	0	(0)

International career
2018	Thailand U21	1	(0)
2019	Thailand U23	6	(0)
- * Club domestic league appearances and goals as of 14:04, 9 April 2026 (UTC)

Patcharapol Intanee (Thai: พัชรพล อินทนี, born 12 October 1998) is a Thai professional footballer who plays as a defensive midfielder and centre back for Thai League 2 club Police Tero.

== Honours ==
=== International ===
Thailand U-23

- 2019 AFF U-22 Youth Championship: Runner up
