= Sanukran Thinjom =

Thai footballer

Personal information
- Full name: Sanukran Thinjom
- Date of birth: 12 September 1993 (age 33)
- Place of birth: Phrae, Thailand
- Height: 1.73 m (5 ft 8 in)
- Positions: Midfielder; left back

Team information
- Current team: Chiangrai United
- Number: 7

Youth career
- 2010–2011: BEC Tero Sasana

Senior career*
Years	Team	Apps	(Gls)
2012–2013	BEC Tero Sasana	0	(0)
2013	→ RBAC (loan)	34	(6)
2014–2019	Muangthong United	55	(6)
2014	→ Customs United (loan)	26	(4)
2015	→ Thonburi City (loan)	12	(0)
2015	→ Nonthaburi (loan)	16	(2)
2016	→ Army United (loan)	26	(2)
2020–2024	Chiangrai United	105	(4)
2024–2025	PT Prachuap	12	(0)
2025	→ Chiangrai United (loan)	7	(0)
2025–	Chiangrai United	11	(0)

International career
2013–2016	Thailand U23	6	(2)
2019	Thailand	1	(0)
- * Club domestic league appearances and goals as of 9 January 2026

Sanukran Thinjom (Thai: ศนุกรานต์ ถิ่นจอม) is a Thai professional footballer who plays as a midfielder for Thai League 1 club Chiangrai United.

== Honours ==
=== Club ===
Muangthong United

- Thai League Cup (1): 2017
- Thailand Champions Cup (1): 2017
- Mekong Club Championship (1): 2017

Chiangrai United

- Thai FA Cup (1): 2020–21
- Thailand Champions Cup (1): 2020
