= Wattana Playnum =

Thai footballer

Personal information
- Full name: Wattana Playnum
- Date of birth: 19 August 1989 (age 37)
- Place of birth: Kamphaeng Phet, Thailand
- Height: 1.80 m (5 ft 11 in)
- Positions: Defensive midfielder; centre back

Team information
- Current team: Uthai Thani
- Number: 19

Youth career
- 2003–2008: Khongphai Wittaya School

Senior career*
Years	Team	Apps	(Gls)
2009–2010	Nakhon Sawan	14	(3)
2011–2012	Paknampho NSRU	26	(4)
2013–2014	Ayutthaya	29	(0)
2015–2021	Muangthong United	93	(1)
2015	→ Pattaya United (loan)	26	(6)
2021–2022	Uthai Thani	21	(1)
2022–2023	Nongbua Pitchaya	19	(0)
2023–	Uthai Thani	67	(0)

International career^{‡}
2017–2018	Thailand	3	(0)
- * Club domestic league appearances and goals as of 24 April 2022 ‡ National team caps and goals as of 31 August 2017

Wattana Playnum (Thai: วัฒนา พลายนุ่ม; born August 19, 1989), simply known as Mike (Thai: ไมค์), is a Thai professional footballer who plays as a defensive midfielder.

== Club career ==
Wattana Playnum played for Nakhon Sawan during 2009-10. In the next season, he was bought by Paknampho NSRU and played there during 2011-12. Subsequently, Phil Stubbins, Ayutthaya head coach at that time, brought him to join Ayutthaya in 2013. In December 2014, one of the biggest teams in Thailand, Muangthong United, which had shown an interest in his potentials, purchased him from Ayutthaya.

Throughout the 2015 season, he was loaned out to Pattaya United, implicitly an allied club to Muangthong United. He helped Pattaya United finish second in 2015 Thai Division 1 League, awarded promotion to 2016 Thai League T1. Since 2016, he was back to and has been playing for Muangthong United.

== International career ==
In March 2017, Wattana made his senior international debut appearing in the starting lineup in the 2018 world cup qualification match against Japan at Saitama Stadium.

== Honours ==
=== International ===
Thailand

- King's Cup (1): 2017

=== Club ===
Muangthong United

- Thai League 1 (1): 2016
- Thai League Cup (2): 2016, 2017
- Thailand Champions Cup (1): 2017
- Mekong Club Championship (1): 2017

Uthai Thani

- Thai League 3 (1): 2021–22
- Thai League 3 Northern Region (1): 2021–22
