= Peerapong Panyanumaporn =

Thai footballer (born 1996)

Personal information
- Full name: Peerapong Panyanumaporn
- Date of birth: 1 June 1996 (age 30)
- Place of birth: Suphan Buri, Thailand
- Height: 1.74 m (5 ft 8 1/2 in)
- Position: Winger

Youth career
- 2012–2017: Muangthong United

Senior career*
Years	Team	Apps	(Gls)
2018–2024	Muangthong United	6	(0)
2016	→ Pattaya United (loan)	0	(0)
2017	→ Bangkok (loan)	19	(2)
2020	→ Udon Thani (loan)	13	(1)
2020–2021	→ Suphanburi (loan)	2	(0)
2022	→ Trat (loan)	8	(1)
2024–2025	Suphanburi	23	(0)
Total		67	(4)
- * Club domestic league appearances and goals as of 26 April 2025

Peerapong Panyanumaporn (Thai: พีรพงศ์ ปัญญานุมาภรณ์), is a Thai former professional footballer who plays as a winger.
