= Kampol Pathomakkakul =

Thai footballer

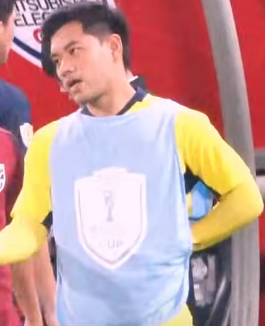
- Kampol in 2025

Personal information
- Full name: Kampol Pathomakkakul
- Date of birth: 27 July 1992 (age 34)
- Place of birth: Phuket, Thailand
- Height: 1.78 m (5 ft 10 in)
- Position: Goalkeeper

Team information
- Current team: Ratchaburi Mitr Phol
- Number: 99

Youth career
- 2007–2009: Ratwinit Bangkaeo School
- 2009–2010: Muangthong United

Senior career*
Years	Team	Apps	(Gls)
2011–2020	Muangthong United	20	(0)
2011	→ Army United (loan)	22	(0)
2012	→ Phuket (loan)	8	(0)
2014–2016	→ Nakhon Ratchasima (loan)	78	(0)
2017	→ Police Tero (loan)	33	(0)
2019	→ Chonburi (loan)	5	(0)
2019	→ Samut Prakan City (loan)	7	(0)
2020	→ Rayong (loan)	11	(0)
2021–	Ratchaburi Mitr Phol	145	(0)

International career^{‡}
2012	Thailand U23	3	(0)
2022–	Thailand	19	(0)
Medal record
Men's football
Representing Thailand
FIFA ASEAN Cup
Runner-up	2026 Indonesia	Team
ASEAN Championship
Winner	Mitsubishi Electric Cup 2022	Team
Runner-up	Mitsubishi Electric Cup 2024	Team
Runner-up	Hyundai Cup 2026	Team
- * Club domestic league appearances and goals as of 9 January 2026 ‡ National team caps and goals as of 2 October 2026

Kampol Pathomakkakul (Thai: กัมพล ปฐมอรรฆย์กุล, born 27 July 1992) is a Thai professional footballer who plays as a goalkeeper for Thai League 1 club Ratchaburi and the Thailand national team.

== International career ==
He was named in head coach Milovan Rajevac's squad for the 2018 FIFA World Cup qualification in August 2017, but did not make an appearance.

In 2022, He was named in Alexandré Pölking's squad for the AFF Mitsubishi Electric Cup 2022 in December 2022. In this tournament, he got a champion and make 2 appearances.

== Honours ==
Thailand

- AFF Championship: 2022

Individual

- Thai League Best XI: 2021–22
