= Wongsakorn Chaikultewin =

Thai professional footballer

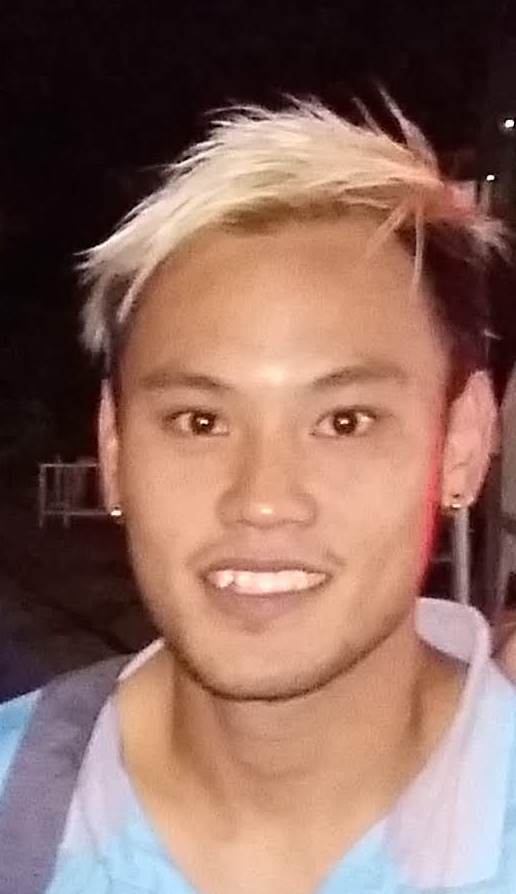

Personal information
- Full name: Wongsakorn Chaikultewin
- Date of birth: 16 September 1996 (age 30)
- Place of birth: Chonburi, Thailand
- Height: 1.72 m (5 ft 7 1/2 in)
- Positions: Attacking midfielder; winger

Team information
- Current team: Muangthong United
- Number: 8

Youth career
- 2009–2013: Muangthong United

Senior career*
Years	Team	Apps	(Gls)
2014–	Muangthong United	85	(3)
2014	→ Nakhon Nayok (loan)	5	(0)
2015	→ Pattaya United (loan)	0	(0)
2015	→ Nonthaburi (loan)	16	(2)
2015	→ Samutsongkhram (loan)	12	(4)
2016	→ Pattaya United (loan)	26	(2)
2017	→ Pattaya United (loan)	7	(1)
2018	→ Udon Thani (loan)	6	(0)
2019	→ Trat (loan)	28	(0)
2020	→ Nakhon Ratchasima (loan)	4	(1)
2025	→ Trat (loan)	0	(0)

International career^{‡}
2011–2012	Thailand U16	4	(0)
2015	Thailand U21	2	(0)
2016	Thailand U23	3	(1)
- * Club domestic league appearances and goals as of 01:36, 31 March 2025 (UTC) ‡ National team caps and goals as of 23:24, 18 September 2017 (UTC)

Wongsakorn Chaikultewin (Thai: วงศกร ชัยกุลเทวินทร์, born September 16, 1996), is a Thai professional footballer who plays as an attacking midfielder, he has also been used as a winger for Thai League 2 club Muangthong United.

== Honours ==
=== Club ===
Muangthong United

- Thai League Cup runner-up: 2023–24
- Thailand Champions Cup: 2017
