= Somporn Yos =

Thai footballer

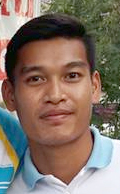

Personal information
- Full name: Somporn Yos
- Date of birth: 23 June 1993 (age 33)
- Place of birth: Kamphaeng Phet, Thailand
- Height: 1.78 m (5 ft 10 in)
- Position: Goalkeeper

Team information
- Current team: Port
- Number: 1

Youth career
- 2009–2011: BEC Tero Sasana

Senior career*
Years	Team	Apps	(Gls)
2012–2016	BEC Tero Sasana	9	(0)
2012	→ RBAC (loan)	10	(0)
2014	→ Phitsanulok (loan)	17	(0)
2014	→ Chiangmai (loan)	11	(0)
2017–2022	Muangthong United	47	(0)
2017	→ Pattaya United (loan)	20	(0)
2018	→ PT Prachuap (loan)	9	(0)
2023–	Port	55	(0)

International career
2012	Thailand U19	3	(0)
2013–2016	Thailand U23	8	(0)
2016	Thailand	0	(0)
Medal record
Thailand under-23
Sea Games
Gold medal – first place	Sea Games 2015	Football
- * Club domestic league appearances and goals as of 30 April 2025

Somporn Yos (Thai: สมพร ยศ, born 23 June 1993) is a Thai professional footballer who plays as a goalkeeper for Thai League 1 club Port.

== International career ==
Somporn won the 2015 Southeast Asian Games with Thailand U23. In 2016, Somporn was selected in the Thailand U23 squad for the 2016 AFC U-23 Championship in Qatar.

In March 2023, he was called up to the Thailand senior squad for a friendly match against Syria and United Arab Emirates, but did not make an appearance.

== Honours ==
=== Club ===
Port

- Thai League Cup: 2025–26
- Piala Presiden: 2025

=== International ===
Thailand U-23

- Sea Games Gold Medal: 2015
- BIDC Cup (Cambodia): 2013
