= Sorawit Panthong =

Thai footballer

Personal information
- Full name: Sorawit Panthong
- Date of birth: 20 February 1997 (age 29)
- Place of birth: Nonthaburi, Thailand
- Height: 1.77 m (5 ft 9 1/2 in)
- Position: Midfielder

Team information
- Current team: Ratchaburi

Youth career
- 2010–2015: Assumption College Thonburi

Senior career*
Years	Team	Apps	(Gls)
2016–2026	Muangthong United	72	(7)
2017	→ Sisaket (loan)	8	(0)
2019	→ Police Tero (loan)	11	(2)
2022–2024	→ Police Tero (loan)	48	(3)
2026–	Ratchaburi	0	(0)

International career^{‡}
2012	Thailand U16	1	(0)
2016	Thailand U19	8	(1)
2017–2018	Thailand U21	7	(2)
2020	Thailand U23	3	(0)
- * Club domestic league appearances and goals as of 01:43, 26 May 2026 (UTC) ‡ National team caps and goals as of 13 May 2023

Sorawit Panthong (Thai: สรวิทย์ พานทอง; born 20 February 1997) is a Thai professional footballer who plays as a midfielder for Thai League 1 club Ratchaburi.

== International career ==
In 2020, he was called up by Thailand U23 for 2020 AFC U-23 Championship in Thailand.

== Honours ==
Muangthong United

- Thai League 1
  - Champions (1) : 2016
- Thai League Cup
  - Champions (1) : 2016
