= Suporn Peenagatapho =

Thai footballer (born 1995)

Personal information
- Full name: Suporn Peenagatapho
- Date of birth: 21 July 1995 (age 31)
- Place of birth: Chanthaburi, Thailand
- Height: 1.75 m (5 ft 9 in)
- Position: Full back

Team information
- Current team: Uthai Thani

Youth career
- 2007–2011: JMG Academy
- 2012–2013: Muangthong United

Senior career*
Years	Team	Apps	(Gls)
2013–2023	Muangthong United	112	(5)
2013	→ Nonthaburi (loan)	16	(0)
2014	→ Nakhon Nayok (loan)	21	(0)
2016–2017	→ BEC Tero Sasana (loan)	24	(0)
2023–2025	Buriram United	12	(0)
2024–2025	→ Ratchaburi (loan)	15	(0)
2025–2026	Ratchaburi	29	(0)
2026–	Uthai Thani	0	(0)

International career
2013–2014	Thailand U19	12	(0)
2016–2017	Thailand U23	2	(0)
- * Club domestic league appearances and goals as of 01:54, 8 June 2026 (UTC)

Suporn Peenagatapho (Thai: สุพร ปีนะกาตาโพธิ์) is a Thai professional footballer who plays as a full back for Thai League 1 club Uthai Thani.

== Honours ==
Muangthong United

- Mekong Club Championship: 2017

Buriram United

- Thai League 1: 2023–24
- Thailand Champions Cup Runner-up: 2023
