= 2017 BEC Tero Sasana F.C. season =

BEC Tero Sasana
2017 season
- Chairman: Chakthip Chaijinda
- Manager: Uthai Boonmoh
- Stadium: Boonyachinda Stadium, Lak Si, Bangkok, Thailand
- Thai League T1: 14th
- Thai FA Cup: Round of 16
- Thai League Cup: Semi-finals
- Top goalscorer: League: Michaël N'dri (14); All: Michaël N'dri (19)

The 2017 season was BEC Tero Sasana's 21st season in the Thai League T1 since 1997.

== Thai League ==
| Date | Opponents | H / A | Result F–A | Scorers | League position |
|---|---|---|---|---|---|
| 11 February 2017 | Pattaya United | H | 2–0 | Dong-chan 60', N'dri 75' (pen.) | 3rd |
| 19 February 2017 | Nakhon Ratchasima Mazda | A | 1–1 | N'dri 54' (pen.) | 4th |
| 25 February 2017 | SCG Muangthong United | H | 0–1 | | 8th |
| 4 March 2017 | Super Power Samut Prakan | A | 2–1 | Kasidech 50', N'dri 77' | 7th |
| 8 March 2017 | Sisaket | H | 1–0 | Abrante 70' | 5th |
| 12 March 2017 | Ratchaburi Mitr Phol | A | 0–1 | | 6th |
| 3 April 2017 | Suphanburi | H | 2–2 | Datsakorn 14', N'dri 20' | 6th |
| 9 April 2017 | Bangkok United | H | 2–0 | Wichan 56', N'dri 74' | 6th |
| 18 April 2017 | Navy | A | 0–0 | | 5th |
| 22 April 2017 | Thai Honda Ladkrabang | H | 3–2 | Wichan 45+1', Pichitphong 60', N'dri 83' | 5th |
| 30 April 2017 | Port | A | 1–2 | Wichan 39' | 6th |
| 3 May 2017 | Ubon UMT United | H | 2–1 | N'dri 29', Wichan 69' | 5th |
| 7 May 2017 | Chiangrai United | A | 1–1 | N'dri 87' | 6th |
| 14 May 2017 | Bangkok Glass | H | 1–2 | Wichan 45' | 8th |
| 21 May 2017 | Buriram United | H | 2–2 | N'dri 29' (pen.), Wichan 67' | 10th |
| 27 May 2017 | Chonburi | H | 1–3 | N'dri 8' | 10th |
| 1 June 2017 | Sukhothai | A | 0–2 | | 10th |
| 18 June 2017 | Nakhon Ratchasima Mazda | H | 3–1 | Weerawut 12', N'dri (2) 39', 90+3' (pen.) | 10th |
| 25 June 2017 | SCG Muangthong United | A | 1–2 | Weerawut 28' | 10th |
| 28 June 2017 | Super Power Samut Prakan | H | 3–1 | Cissé 13', Tanasak 24', N'dri 42' | 8th |
| 2 July 2017 | Sisaket | A | 1–2 | N'dri 25' (pen.) | 10th |
| 5 July 2017 | Ratchaburi Mitr Phol | H | 0–0 | | 10th |
| 8 July 2017 | Suphanburi | A | 2–3 | Seksit 67', Cissé 73' | 10th |
| 29 July 2017 | Bangkok United | A | 2–5 | Wichan 45+2', Phuwanart 83' | 12th |
| 6 August 2017 | Navy | H | 0–0 | | 11th |
| 10 September 2017 | Thai Honda Ladkrabang | A | 1–2 | Jaturong 68' | 13th |
| 16 September 2017 | Port | H | 2–1 | Pakorn 33' (o.g.), Wichan 90+1' | 10th |
| 20 September 2017 | Ubon UMT United | A | 1–1 | Wichan 86' (pen.) | 10th |
| 14 October 2017 | Bangkok Glass | A | 0–4 | | 12th |
| 22 October 2017 | Sukhothai | H | 1–1 | Chenrop 53' | 14th |
| 8 November 2017 | Buriram United | A | 0–4 | | 14th |
| 12 November 2017 | Chonburi | A | 1–5 | Weerawut 31' | 14th |
| 15 November 2017 | Chiangrai United | H | 3–1 | Sadney 53', Tanasak 65', Wichan 82' | 13th |
| 18 November 2017 | Pattaya United | A | 0–3 | | 14th |

| Pos | Team | Pld | W | D | L | GF | GA | GD | Pts | Qualification or relegation |
|---|---|---|---|---|---|---|---|---|---|---|
| 12 | Nakhon Ratchasima Mazda | 34 | 10 | 11 | 13 | 42 | 48 | −6 | 41 | |
| 13 | Navy | 34 | 10 | 10 | 14 | 42 | 50 | −8 | 40 | |
| 14 | BEC Tero Sasana | 34 | 10 | 9 | 15 | 42 | 57 | −15 | 39 | |
| 15 | Sukhothai | 34 | 8 | 12 | 14 | 54 | 66 | −12 | 36 | |
| 16 | Thai Honda Ladkrabang (R) | 34 | 8 | 4 | 22 | 43 | 68 | −25 | 28 | Relegation to the 2018 Thai League 2 |

Updated to match(es) played on 18 November 2017. Source: Thai League
Rules for classification: 1) Points; 2) Head-to-head points; 3) Head-to-head goals difference; 4) Head-to-head goals scored; 5) Overall goals difference; 6) Overall goals scored; 7) Fair play points; 8) Play-off without extra time;).
(R) Relegated

== Thai FA Cup ==
| Date | Opponents | H / A | Result F–A | Scorers | Round |
|---|---|---|---|---|---|
| 21 June 2017 | Rajpracha | A | 4–3 | Seksit 38', Teeraphol 44', N'dri (2) 62', 90+1' | Round of 64 |
| 2 August 2017 | Thai Honda Ladkrabang | H | 2–1 (a.e.t.) | Phuwanart 38', N'dri 118' | Round of 32 |
| 27 September 2017 | Chiangrai United | A | 1–3 (a.e.t.) | N'dri 120' | Round of 16 |

== Thai League Cup ==
| Date | Opponents | H / A | Result F–A | Scorers | Round |
|---|---|---|---|---|---|
| 26 July 2017 | Kalasin | A | 2–0 (awd.) | | Round of 32 |
| 1 October 2017 | Prachuap | A | 1–1 (a.e.t.) (4–3p) | N'dri 50' | Round of 16 |
| 11 October 2017 | Air Force Central | A | 1–0 | Pichitphong 11' | Quarter-finals |
| 4 November 2017 | SCG Muangthong United | N | 1–2 | Jaka 65' (pen.) | Semi-finals |

== Squad goals statistics ==
| No. | Pos. | Name | League | FA Cup | League Cup | Total |
|---|---|---|---|---|---|---|
| 1 | GK | (Thailand) Witsanusak Kaewruang | 0 | 0 | 0 | 0 |
| 2 | DF | (Thailand) Thritthi Nonsrichai | 0 | 0 | 0 | 0 |
| 3 | DF | (Thailand) Suporn Peenagatapho | 0 | 0 | 0 | 0 |
| 4 | MF | (Thailand) Wichan Nantasri | 0 | 0 | 0 | 0 |
| 5 | DF | (Thailand) Tanasak Srisai | 0 | 0 | 0 | 0 |
| 6 | DF | (Spain) Mario Abrante | 0 | 0 | 0 | 0 |
| 7 | MF | (Thailand) Datsakorn Thonglao | 0 | 0 | 0 | 0 |
| 8 | DF | (Thailand) Atit Daosawang | 0 | 0 | 0 | 0 |
| 9 | FW | (France) Michaël N'dri | 3 | 0 | 0 | 3 |
| 10 | FW | (South Korea) Kim Dong-chan | 1 | 0 | 0 | 1 |
| 11 | DF | (Thailand) Weerawut Kayem | 0 | 0 | 0 | 0 |
| 13 | GK | (Thailand) Ittikorn Karnsang | 0 | 0 | 0 | 0 |
| 14 | FW | (Thailand) Jaturong Pimkoon | 0 | 0 | 0 | 0 |
| 15 | MF | (Thailand) Thammarat Wanmanee | 0 | 0 | 0 | 0 |
| 16 | FW | (Thailand) Rittiporn Wanchuen | 0 | 0 | 0 | 0 |
| 17 | MF | (Thailand) Seksit Srisai | 0 | 0 | 0 | 0 |
| 19 | MF | (Thailand) Pichitphong Choeichiu | 0 | 0 | 0 | 0 |
| 20 | MF | (Mali) Kalifa Cissé | 0 | 0 | 0 | 0 |
| 22 | MF | (Thailand) Ekkachai Rittipan | 0 | 0 | 0 | 0 |
| 23 | MF | (Brazil) Vinícius Soares | 0 | 0 | 0 | 0 |
| 24 | MF | (Thailand) Kasidech Wettayawong | 1 | 0 | 0 | 1 |
| 26 | MF | (Thailand) Sitthichok Tassanai | 0 | 0 | 0 | 0 |
| 28 | GK | (Thailand) Kampol Pathom-attakul | 0 | 0 | 0 | 0 |
| 29 | FW | (Thailand) Chenrop Samphaodi | 0 | 0 | 0 | 0 |
| 30 | DF | (Thailand) Satja Saengsuwan | 0 | 0 | 0 | 0 |
| 33 | FW | (Thailand) Ronnachai Pongputtha | 0 | 0 | 0 | 0 |
| 34 | DF | (Thailand) Pharanyu Uppala | 0 | 0 | 0 | 0 |
| 36 | DF | (Thailand) Ukrit Thiamlert | 0 | 0 | 0 | 0 |
| 40 | MF | (Thailand) Isariya Marom | 0 | 0 | 0 | 0 |

== Transfers ==
First Thai footballer's market is opening on 14 December 2016 to 28 January 2017
Second Thai footballer's market is opening on 3 June 2017 to 30 June 2017

=== In ===
| Date | Pos. | Name | From |
|---|---|---|---|
| 21 December 2016 | FW | (South Korea) Kim Dong-chan | (South Korea) Daejeon Citizen |
| 5 January 2017 | MF | (Thailand) Datsakorn Thonglao | (Thailand) SCG Muangthong United |
| 6 January 2017 | DF | (Thailand) Atit Daosawang | (Thailand) SCG Muangthong United |
| 6 January 2017 | DF | (Thailand) Weerawut Kayem | (Thailand) SCG Muangthong United |
| 6 January 2017 | GK | (Thailand) Witsanusak Kaewruang | (Thailand) SCG Muangthong United |
| 6 January 2017 | MF | (Thailand) Seksit Srisai | (Thailand) SCG Muangthong United |
| 6 January 2017 | MF | (Thailand) Kasidech Wettayawong | (Thailand) SCG Muangthong United |
| 6 January 2017 | MF | (Thailand) Pichitphong Choeichiu | (Thailand) Chiangrai United |
| 6 January 2017 | GK | (Thailand) Ittikorn Karnsang | (Thailand) Phrae United |
| 13 January 2017 | GK | (Thailand) Kampol Pathom-attakul | (Thailand) Nakhon Ratchasima Mazda |
| 21 January 2017 | DF | (Thailand) Thritthi Nonsrichai | (Thailand) Bangkok United |
| 29 January 2017 | FW | (Thailand) Ronnachai Rangsiyo | (Thailand) Bangkok United |
| 2 February 2017 | DF | (Thailand) Tanasak Srisai | (Thailand) Pattaya United |
| 2 February 2017 | DF | (Thailand) Satja Saengsuwan | (Thailand) Udon Thani |
| 2 February 2017 | MF | (Thailand) Thammarat Wanmanee | (Thailand) Army United |
| 2 February 2017 | FW | (Thailand) Rittiporn Wanchuen | (Thailand) Chamchuri United |
| 2 February 2017 | DF | (Thailand) Pharanyu Uppala | (Thailand) Pattaya United |
| 2 February 2017 | DF | (Thailand) Ukrit Thiamlert | (Thailand) Phrae United |
| 2 February 2017 | MF | (Thailand) Isariya Marom | (Thailand) Pattaya United |
| 8 February 2017 | DF | (Spain) Mario Abrante | (Thailand) SCG Muangthong United |
| 8 February 2017 | MF | (Mali) Kalifa Cissé | (Thailand) Bangkok Glass |
| 9 February 2017 | MF | (Brazil) Vinícius Soares | (Brazil) Bragantino |
| 9 June 2017 | DF | (Thailand) Saranyu Intarach | (Thailand) BBCU |
| 9 June 2017 | DF | (Thailand) Patiparn Phetphun | (Thailand) BBCU |
| 9 June 2017 | MF | (Thailand) Teeraphol Yoryoei | (Thailand) Army United |
| 9 June 2017 | DF | (Thailand) Ratchanon Phangkaew | (Thailand) Udon Thani |
| 9 June 2017 | DF | (Thailand) Sanchai Nontasila | (Thailand) Udon Thani |

=== Out ===
| Date | Pos. | Name | To |
|---|---|---|---|
| 4 November 2016 | MF | (Thailand) Sivakorn Tiatrakul | (Thailand) Chiangrai United |
| 4 November 2016 | MF | (Thailand) Phitiwat Sukjitthammakul | (Thailand) Chiangrai United |
| 10 December 2016 | GK | (Thailand) Prasit Padungchok | (Thailand) SCG Muangthong United |
| 10 December 2016 | MF | (Thailand) Pitakpong Kulasuwan | (Thailand) SCG Muangthong United |
| 10 December 2016 | GK | (Thailand) Putthipong Promlee | (Thailand) SCG Muangthong United |
| 6 January 2017 | DF | (Thailand) Apichet Puttan | (Thailand) Army United |
| 6 January 2017 | DF | (Thailand) Chayaphat Kitpongsrithada | (Thailand) Chonburi |
| 6 January 2017 | MF | (Japan) Takahiro Kawamura | Released |
| 6 January 2017 | FW | (Serbia) Milan Bubalo | (Thailand) Pattaya United |
| 6 January 2017 | MF | (Thailand) Suradet Klankhum | (Thailand) Pattaya United |
| 6 January 2017 | DF | (Thailand) Sarawut Kanlayanabandit | (Thailand) Pattaya United |
| 6 January 2017 | GK | (Thailand) Somporn Yos | (Thailand) Pattaya United |
| 6 January 2017 | DF | (Thailand) Adisak Waenlor | (Thailand) Pattaya United |
| 6 January 2017 | MF | (Thailand) Anuwat Inyin | (Thailand) Pattaya United |
| 6 January 2017 | GK | (Thailand) Todsaporn Sri-reung | (Thailand) Nakhon Pathom United |
| 17 January 2017 | FW | (Lebanon) Soony Saad | (United States) Sporting Kansas City |
| 2 February 2017 | DF | (Serbia) Sreten Sretenović | (Serbia) Borac Čačak |
| 2 February 2017 | MF | (Serbia) Miloš Bosančić | (Czech Republic) Slovan Liberec |
| 2 February 2017 | MF | (Thailand) Suwaphat Chansitha | (Thailand) Pattaya United |
| 2 February 2017 | MF | (Thailand) Atikun Mheetuam | Released |
| 2 February 2017 | DF | (Thailand) Wiritpol Chanokkawinkul | (Thailand) Bangkok |
| 12 June 2017 | DF | (Thailand) Atit Daosawang | (Thailand) Chiangrai United |

=== Loan in ===
| Date from | Date to | Pos. | Name | From |
|---|---|---|---|---|
| 5 January 2017 | 31 December 2017 | FW | (France) Michaël N'dri | (Thailand) SCG Muangthong United |
