= 2026–27 BG Pathum United F.C. season =

Association football season

BG Pathum United
2026–27 season
- Chairman: (Thailand) Pavin Bhirombhakdi
- Manager: (Montenegro) Vladimir Vujović
- Stadium: BG Stadium, Thanyaburi, Pathum Thani, Thailand
Home colours	Away colours	Third colours

The 2026–27 season is BG Pathum United's seventh consecutive season in Thai League 1, following promotion in 2019.

In addition to the domestic league, the club will also compete in this season's editions of the Thai FA Cup, Thai League Cup, and 2026–27 AFC Champions League Two.

== Squad ==
As of 8 August 2026

No.	Name	Nationality	Date of birth (age)	Previous club	Contract since	Contract end
Goalkeepers
13	Issarapong Waewdee	(Thailand)	1 October 2004 (age 22)	(Thailand) Customs United	2023	
28	Saranon Anuin	(Thailand)	24 March 1994 (age 32)	(Thailand) Chiangrai United	2024	2026
49	Nalawich Intacharoen	(Thailand)	11 November 2003 (age 23)	(Singapore) Tampines Rovers (S1)	2023	2027
89	Chanasorn Kaewyos	(Thailand)	12 September 2005 (age 21)	(Thailand) Bangkok United	2026	2027
93	Achirawit Natsanthia	(Thailand)	18 June 2009 (age 17)	(Thailand) Nakhon Ratchasima	2026	2029
Defenders
2	Chanon Tamma	(Thailand)	19 March 2004 (age 22)	(Thailand) Ayutthaya United	2025	2027
3	Yeferson Quintana	(Uruguay)	19 April 1996 (age 30)	(Brazil) Paysandu (B3)	2026	2027
15	Chonnapat Buaphan	(Thailand)	22 March 2004 (age 22)	(Japan) Nara Club (J3)	2022	2026
16	Takahiro Yanagi	(Japan)	5 August 1997 (age 29)	(Japan) Ikoma FC Nara (J5)	2026	2027
17	Elias Dolah	(Thailand) (Sweden)	24 April 1993 (age 33)	(Thailand) Buriram United	2026	2027
24	Saharat Pongsuwan	(Thailand)	11 June 1996 (age 30)	(Thailand) Rayong	2026	2027
25	Pawee Tanthatemee	(Thailand)	22 October 1996 (age 30)	(Thailand) Kanchanaburi Power	2026	
27	Jonathan Scherzer	(Austria)	22 July 1995 (age 31)	(Austria) SV Ried (A1)	2026	2027
39	Tanasith Siripala	(Thailand)	9 August 1995 (age 31)	(Thailand) Kanchanaburi Power		
44	Marko Nikolić	(Serbia) (Hungary)	31 March 1998 (age 28)	(Serbia) FK Mačva Šabac (S1)	2026	
48	Waris Choolthong	(Thailand)	8 January 2004 (age 22)	Youth Team	2022	2026
50	Edin Osmanovic	(Luxembourg) (Montenegro)	30 August 2001 (age 25)	(Bosnia and Herzegovina) Željezničar (B1)	2026	
62	Runpiset Phutummee	(Thailand)	27 December 2007 (age 18)	Youth team		
94	Khatawut Poladao	(Thailand)	21 April 2006 (age 20)	(Thailand) Customs United	2025	2027
97	Thunwisit Taman	(Thailand)	9 December 2008 (age 17)	(Thailand) Assumption College	2025	2027
	Thanet Suknate	(Thailand)	26 July 2005 (age 21)	(Thailand) Ayutthaya United	2023	2027
Midfielders
4	Leon James	(Thailand) (England)	29 August 2001 (age 25)	(Thailand) Buriram United	2026	
5	Kritsada Kaman	(Thailand)	18 March 1999 (age 27)	(Thailand) Chonburi	2024	2027
6	Sarach Yooyen	(Thailand)	30 May 1992 (age 34)	(Japan) Renofa Yamaguchi (J2)	2020	2026
8	Akarapong Pumwisat	(Thailand)	23 November 1995 (age 30)	(Thailand) Lamphun Warriors	2026	
18	Chanathip Songkrasin	(Thailand)	5 October 1993 (age 33)	(Japan) Kawasaki Frontale (J1)	2023	2027
26	Anthony Belmonte	(France)	16 October 1995 (age 31)	(Greece) Panionios (G2)	2026	
30	Hugo Rama	(Spain)	22 November 1996 (age 30)	(Greece) Athens Kallithea (G2)	2026	
33	Ryan Edwards	(Australia) (Singapore)	17 November 1993 (age 33)	(Cyprus) Omonia Aradippou (C1)	2026	
59	Anan Samaae	(Thailand)	11 November 2005 (age 21)	(Thailand) Customs United	2025	2027
77	Thanakorn Papaphe	(Thailand)	30 November 2005 (age 20)	(Thailand) Customs United	2025	2026
	Thanadol Kaosaart	(Thailand)	18 August 2001 (age 25)	(Thailand) Nakhon Si United	2024	
	Thanakrit Laorkai	(Thailand)	22 December 2003 (age 22)	(Thailand) Bangkok		2027
	Kittapak Seangsawat	(Thailand)	8 April 2005 (age 21)	(Thailand) Muangthong United		2027
Strikers
7	Raniel	(Brazil)	11 June 1996 (age 30)	(United Arab Emirates) Khor Fakkan Club (U1)	2024	2026
9	Surachat Sareepim	(Thailand) (Laos)	24 October 1986 (age 40)	(Thailand) Police Tero	2016	2026
10	Lucas Andersen (Note: Lucas Andersen registered for ACL2 and Shopee Cup only)	(Denmark)	13 September 1994 (age 32)	(England) QPR (E2)	2026	2027
11	Patrik Gustavsson	(Thailand) (Sweden)	19 April 2001 (age 25)	(Japan) Nara Club (J3)	2022	2029
19	Ashley Coffey (Note: Ashley Coffey registered for ACL2 and Shopee Cup only)	(England)	1 December 1993 (age 32)	(Jordan) Al-Hussein		
20	Marin Jurina	(Bosnia and Herzegovina)	26 November 1993 (age 32)	(Hungary) MTK Budapest (M1)	2026	
21	Pasqual Verkamp	(Thailand) (Germany)	15 October 1997 (age 29)	(Germany) Lokomotive Leipzig		
22	Matheus Costa	(Brazil)	10 August 1999 (age 27)	(Iran) Foolad	2026	2027
37	Fabio Kaufmann	(Germany) (Italy)	8 September 1992 (age 34)	(Germany) Eintracht Braunschweig		
45	João Magno	(Brazil)	15 February 1997 (age 29)	(Brazil) Betim Futebol (B4)		
54	Kongnat Thuamthongdee	(Thailand)	25 January 2007 (age 19)	Youth Team	2025	
79	Witthawat Phraothaisong	(Thailand)	21 April 2007 (age 19)	(Singapore) Tampines Rovers (S1)	2025	2026
90	Pichaya Chaiwarangkun	(Thailand)	7 April 2007 (age 19)	Youth Team	2025	2027
91	Ratthasat Buaban	(Thailand)	4 June 2007 (age 19)	(Thailand) Muang Loei United	2025	2027
Players loaned out during season
8	Ekanit Panya	(Thailand)	21 October 1999 (age 27)	(Japan) Ehime FC (J2)	2025	2029
14	Tomoyuki Doi	(Japan)	24 November 1997 (age 28)	(Singapore) Geylang International (S1)	2025	2027
22	Nathan James	(Thailand) (England)	28 September 2004 (age 22)	(England) Mickleover (E7)	2025	2027
27	Pongrawit Jantawong	(Thailand)	7 October 2000 (age 26)	(Thailand) Chanthaburi	2025	2026
29	Warinthon Jamnongwat (D)	(Thailand)	21 September 2002 (age 24)	(Thailand) Chainat Hornbill	2024	2026
30	Itthimon Tippanet (F)	(Thailand)	30 November 2007 (age 18)	Youth Team	2025	2027
47	Nuttawut Wongsawang (D)	(Thailand)	19 April 2004 (age 22)	Youth Team	2025	2026
50	Teerapat Pruetong	(Thailand)	17 February 2007 (age 19)	(Japan) Hokkaido Consadole Sapporo	2025	2026
62	Airfan Doloh	(Thailand)	26 January 2001 (age 25)	(Thailand) Uthai Thani	2024	2027
77	Siwakorn Ponsan	(Thailand)	24 January 2008 (age 18)	(Thailand) Nakhon Ratchasima; Municipality Sports School	2025	2027
	Rattanachat Neamthaisong (G)	(Thailand)	21 May 2001 (age 25)	(Thailand) Nakhon Si United	2025	
	Chinnawat Prachuabmon	(Thailand)	4 March 2004 (age 22)	(Thailand) Chiangrai United		
	Thitipat Ekarunpong	(Thailand)	5 January 2005 (age 21)	(Thailand) Nakhon Pathom United		
Players left during season
Players not registered

== Coaching staff ==
The following list displays the coaching staff of all the BG Pathum United current football sections:

First Team

Position	Name
Chairman	(Thailand) Pavin Bhirombhakdi (till 22 Sept 2025)
Head Coach	(Serbia) Vladimir Vujović
Asst. Coach	(Thailand) Pichitphong Choeichiu (Serbia) Andrija Ferlez
Goalkeeper Coach	(Brazil) Marquinhos Domingues (Thailand) Kittisak Rawangpa
Set piece coach	(Spain) Gerardo Rubio
Doctor	(Thailand) Pakapon Issaragrisil
Interpreter	(Thailand) Hasdin Sukkoki
Physiotherapist	(Thailand) Yongsak Lertdamrongkiet (Thailand) Saranyoo Kheawlek (Thailand) Chalotorn Chaisiri
Fitness Trainer	(Brazil) Neri Caldeira (Thailand) Auttapon Boonsan
Nutritionist	(Thailand) Thanatpong Sukwong
Head of Scouting	(Netherlands) (Portugal) Fernando Jorge Avidago da Cunha

== Transfer ==
=== In ===
Preseason

Date	Position	Player	Transferred from	Fee	Ref
First team
1 April 2026	MF	(Denmark) Lucas Andersen	(England) QPR	Free	
31 May 2026	GK	(Thailand) Rattanachat Neamthaisong	(Thailand) Nakhon Si United (T2)	End of loan	
31 May 2026	DF	(Thailand) (Italy) Marco Ballini	(Thailand) Chiangrai United	End of loan	
31 May 2026	MF	(Thailand) Chaowat Veerachat	(Thailand) PT Prachuap	End of loan	
31 May 2026	MF	(Thailand) Airfan Doloh	(Thailand) Uthai Thani	End of loan	
31 May 2026	MF	(Thailand) Jaroensak Wonggorn	(Thailand) Ratchaburi	End of loan	
31 May 2026	MF	(Thailand) Phakapon Boonchuay	(Thailand) Trat	End of loan	
31 May 2026	FW	(Thailand) Nattawut Suksum	(Thailand) Chanthaburi (T2)	End of loan	
31 May 2026	MF	(Thailand) Kanokpon Buspakom	(Thailand) Chanthaburi (T2)	End of loan	
31 May 2026	FW	(Singapore) (South Africa) Ilhan Fandi	(Thailand) Buriram United	End of loan	
2 June 2026	DF	(Thailand) Pawee Tanthatemee	(Thailand) Kanchanaburi Power	Free	
2 June 2026	MF	(Thailand) Akarapong Pumwisat	(Thailand) Lamphun Warriors	Free	
6 June 2026	MF	(France) Anthony Belmonte	(Greece) Panionios (G2)	Free	
7 June 2026	MF	(Australia) (Singapore) Ryan Edwards	(Cyprus) Omonia Aradippou (C1)	Free	
8 June 2026	FW	(Brazil) João Magno	(Brazil) Betim Futebol (B4)	Free	
9 June 2026	DF	(Thailand) Chanon Tamma	(Thailand) Ayutthaya United	End of loan	
9 June 2026	MF	(Thailand) (England) Leon James	(Thailand) Buriram United	Free	
11 June 2026	DF	(Serbia) (Hungary) Marko Nikolić	(Serbia) FK Mačva Šabac (S1)	Undisclosed	
12 June 2026	DF	(Japan) Takahiro Yanagi	(Japan) Ikoma FC Nara (J5)	Free	
21 June 2026	DF	(Thailand) Saharat Pongsuwan	(Thailand) Rayong	Free	
23 June 2026	DF	(Luxembourg) (Montenegro) Edin Osmanovic	(Bosnia and Herzegovina) Željezničar	Free	
1 July 2026	FW	(England) Ashley Coffey	(Jordan) Al-Hussein	Free	
2 July 2026	FW	(Germany) (Italy) Fabio Kaufmann	(Germany) Eintracht Braunschweig	Free	
8 July 2026	FW	(Thailand) (Germany) Pasqual Verkamp	(Germany) Lokomotive Leipzig	Free	
20 July 2026	DF	(Thailand) (Sweden) Elias Dolah	(Thailand) Buriram United	Season loan	
21 July 2026	DF	(Uruguay) Yeferson Quintana	(Brazil) Paysandu	Free	
9 August 2026	MF	(Thailand) Tanasith Siripala	(Thailand) Port	Free	
20 August 2026	FW	(Brazil) Matheus Costa	(Iran) Foolad	Free	
16 September 2026	DF	(Thailand) Kittapak Seangsawat	(Thailand) Muangthong United	Free	
8 October 2026	FW	(Bosnia and Herzegovina) Marin Jurina	(Bulgaria) MTK Budapest	Free	
13 October 2026	MF	(Spain) Hugo Rama	(Greece) Athens Kallithea	Free	
14 October 2026	DF	(Austria) Jonathan Scherzer	(Austria) SV Ried	Free	
October 2026	DF	(Netherlands) Mitchell Dijks	(Vietnam) Nam Dinh	Free	
Academy
31 May 2026	GK	(Thailand) Issarapong Waewdee	(Thailand) Customs United (T3)	End of loan	
31 May 2026	DF	(Thailand) Khatawut Poladao	(Thailand) Customs United (T3)	End of loan	
31 May 2026	DF	(Thailand) Thanet Suknate	(Thailand) Ayutthaya United	End of loan	
31 May 2026	DF	(Thailand) Thanawat Pimyotha	(Thailand) Chiangrai United	End of loan	
31 May 2026	MF	(Thailand) Nanthiphat Chaiman	(Thailand) Chiangrai United	End of loan	
31 May 2026	MF	(Thailand) Anan Samaae	(Thailand) Customs United (T3)	End of loan	
31 May 2026	MF	(Thailand) Thanakon Papaphe	(Thailand) Customs United (T3)	End of loan	
31 May 2026	MF	(Thailand) Thanadol Kaosaart	(Thailand) Nakhon Si United (T2)	End of loan	
31 May 2026	MF	(Thailand) Thanakrit Laorkai	(Thailand) Bangkok (T2)	End of loan	
31 May 2026	FW	(Thailand) Thitipat Ekarunpong	(Thailand) Nakhon Pathom United (T2)	End of loan	
31 May 2026	FW	(Thailand) Chinnawat Prachuabmon	(Thailand) Nakhon Pathom United (T2)	End of loan	
31 May 2026	FW	(Thailand) Teerapat Pruetong	(Japan) Hokkaido Consadole Sapporo	End of Loan	

=== Out ===
Pre-Season

Date	Position	Player	Transferred To	Fee	Ref
First team
8 May 2026	DF	(Cambodia) (Japan) Takaki Ose	(Cambodia) Svay Rieng	Free	
31 May 2026	DF	(Thailand) (Sweden) Elias Dolah	(Thailand) Buriram United	End of loan	
31 May 2026	DF	(Laos) Phoutthavong Sangvilay	(Laos) Ezra	End of loan	
10 June 2026	DF	(Thailand) Warinthon Jamnongwat	(Thailand) Ayutthaya United	Season loan	
10 June 2026	MF	(Thailand) Ekanit Panya	(Thailand) Ratchaburi	Season loan	
13 June 2026	GK	(Thailand) Rattanachat Neamthaisong	(Thailand) Nakhon Si United (T2)	Season loan	
13 June 2026	MF	(Thailand) Chaowat Veerachat	(Thailand) Chonburi	Free	
15 June 2026	MF	(Thailand) Nuttawut Wongsawang	(Thailand) Kanchanaburi Power	Season loan	
15 June 2026	MF	(Thailand) Phakapon Boonchuay	(Thailand) Kanchanaburi Power	Free	
16 June 2026	MF	(Thailand) Airfan Doloh	(Thailand) Uthai Thani	Season loan	
27 June 2026	FW	(Thailand) Nattawut Suksum	(Thailand) Nongbua Pitchaya	Free	
28 June 2026	MF	(Thailand) Kanokpon Buspakom	(Thailand) Nakhon Ratchasima	Free	
30 June 2026	GK	(Thailand) Pisan Dorkmaikaew	Retired	N.A.	
30 June 2026	DF	(Japan) (Indonesia) Riku Matsuda	(Cambodia) Phnom Penh Crown	Free	
30 June 2026	DF	(Georgia (country)) Nika Sandokhadze	(Georgia (country))	Free	
30 June 2026	DF	(Thailand) Thanawat Pimyotha	(Thailand) Rayong	Free	
30 June 2026	DF	(Thailand) Jaroensak Wonggorn	(Thailand) Muangthong United	Free	
30 June 2026	MF	(Thailand) Chatmongkol Thongkiri	(Thailand) Lamphun Warriors	Free	
30 June 2026	MF	(Japan) Gakuto Notsuda	(Indonesia) Persib Bandung	Free	
30 June 2026	MF	(Japan) Yoshiaki Takagi	Retired	N.A.	
30 June 2026	FW	(Brazil) (Italy) Matheus Fornazari	(Indonesia) PSS Sleman	Free	
3 July 2026	DF	(Thailand) Sanchai Nontasila	(Thailand) Ratchaburi	Undisclosed	
7 July 2026	FW	(Singapore) (South Africa) Ikhsan Fandi	(Japan) Thespa Gunma	Undisclosed	
20 July 2026	FW	(Singapore) (South Africa) Ilhan Fandi	(Singapore) Lion City Sailors	Free	
29 July 2026	DF	(Thailand) (Italy) Marco Ballini	(Thailand) Chiangrai United	Free	
18 August 2026	DF	(Thailand) Pongrawit Jantawong	(Thailand) Ayutthaya United	Season loan	
22 August 2026	FW	(Japan) Tomoyuki Doi	(Thailand) Chonburi	Season loan	
	MF	(Thailand) Thanakrit Laorkai	(Thailand)	Free	
Academy
1 June 2026	FW	(Thailand) Teerapat Pruetong	(Japan) Hokkaido Consadole Sapporo	Season loan	
1 June 2026	FW	(Thailand) Thitipat Ekarunpong	(Thailand) Nakhon Pathom United (T2)	Season loan	
1 July 2026	DF	(Thailand) (England) Nathan James	(Thailand) Mahasarakham	Season loan	
1 July 2026	MF	(Thailand) Nanthiphat Chaiman	(Japan) Nara Club	Season loan	
1 July 2026	FW	(Thailand) Siwakorn Ponsan	(Japan) Nara Club	Season loan	
11 July 2026	FW	(Thailand) Chinnawat Prachuabmon	(Thailand) Chanthaburi (T2)	Season loan	
12 August 2026	FW	(Thailand) Itthimon Tippanet	(Japan) Hokkaido Consadole Sapporo	Season loan	

=== Promoted ===
Position	Player	Ref

== Friendlies ==
=== Pre-Season Friendly ===
Win Draw Loss

12 July 2026 1	Roi Et PB United (Thailand)	0–5	(Thailand) BG Pathum United	Roi Et
			Raniel 27'; Lucas Anderson 30'; Akarapong Pumwisat 54'; Witthawat Phraothaisong 68'; Tomoyuki Doi 80'	Stadium: Roi Et Province Stadium

19 July 2026 2	Mahasarakham (Thailand)	1–3	(Thailand) BG Pathum United	Mahasarakham
	Parinya Utapao 33'		Surachat Sareepim 8'; João Magno 89'; Pasquale Verkamp 90+3'	Stadium: Mahasarakham Province Stadium

26 July 2026 3	BG Pathum United (Thailand)	0–3	(Thailand) Buriram United	Pathum Thani
		Report	Guilherme Bissoli 10', 25'; Supachai Chaided 15'	Stadium: True BG Stadium

4 August 2026 4	BG Pathum United (Thailand)	1–3	(England) Aston Villa	Pathum Thani
	James 83'	Report	Buendía 12'; Lindelöf 31'; Kamara 62'	Stadium: True BG Stadium; Referee: Alongkorn Konwai

9 August 2026 5	Lee Man (Hong Kong)	2–2	(Thailand) BG Pathum United	Pathum Thani
	Merabi Gigauri 8'; Willian Gaucho 90+3'		João Magno 38'; Takahiro Yanagi 55'	Stadium: True BG Stadium

22 August 2026 6	Ratchaburi (Thailand)	0–0	(Thailand) BG Pathum United	Ratchaburi
				Stadium: Dragon Solar Park

== Team statistics ==
=== Appearances and goals ===
As of 8 November 26

No.	Pos.	Player	League 1		FA Cup		League Cup		AFC Champions League Two		Total	
No.	Pos.	Player	Apps.	Goals	Apps.	Goals	Apps.	Goals	Apps.	Goals	Apps.	Goals
2	DF	(Thailand) Chanon Tamma	2	0	0	0	0	0	1	0	3	0
3	DF	(Uruguay) Yeferson Quintana	0	0	1	0	0	0	3	0	4	0
4	MF	(Thailand) (England) Leon James	3+1	1	1	0	0	0	1+1	0	7	1
5	MF	(Thailand) Kritsada Kaman	6+2	0	0+1	0	0	0	4	0	13	0
6	MF	(Thailand) Sarach Yooyen	6+2	0	0+1	0	0	0	3+1	0	13	0
7	FW	(Brazil) Raniel	3	3	0	0	0	0	0+1	0	4	3
8	MF	(Thailand) Akarapong Pumwisat	3+1	1	1	0	0	0	0	0	5	1
9	FW	(Thailand) (Laos) Surachat Sareepim	0+4	0	1	0	0	0	0+1	0	6	0
10	FW	(Denmark) Lucas Andersen	4+1	0	0	0	0	0	2+1	0	8	0
11	FW	(Thailand) (Sweden) Patrik Gustavsson	3+2	1	0	0	0	0	2+1	1	8	2
13	GK	(Thailand) Issarapong Waewdee	0	0	0	0	0	0	0	0	0	0
15	DF	(Thailand) Chonnapat Buaphan	0+2	0	0	0	0	0	0	0	2	0
16	DF	(Japan) Takahiro Yanagi	2	0	0	0	0	0	2	0	4	0
17	DF	(Thailand) (Sweden) Elias Dolah	4+1	0	0	0	0	0	0+1	0	6	0
18	MF	(Thailand) Chanathip Songkrasin	5+1	0	0	0	0	0	3	0	9	0
19	FW	(England) Ashley Coffey	2+4	0	1	0	0	0	0+3	0	10	0
20	FW	(Bosnia and Herzegovina) Marin Jurina	0	0	0	0	0	0	3	4	3	4
21	FW	(Thailand) (Germany) Pasqual Verkamp	3	1	0+1	0	0	0	0	0	4	1
22	FW	(Brazil) Matheus Costa	3+2	0	0	0	0	0	0+2	1	7	1
24	DF	(Thailand) Saharat Pongsuwan	0	0	1	0	0	0	0	0	1	0
25	DF	(Thailand) Pawee Tanthatemee	0	0	1	0	0	0	0	0	1	0
26	MF	(France) Anthony Belmonte	2+3	0	0	0	0	0	3	1	8	1
27	DF	(Austria) Jonathan Scherzer	0	0	0	0	0	0	1	0	1	0
28	GK	(Thailand) Saranon Anuin	8	0	1	0	0	0	4	0	13	0
30	MF	(Spain) Hugo Rama	0	0	0	0	0	0	3	1	3	1
33	MF	(Australia) (Singapore) Ryan Edwards	2+1	0	0	0	0	0	1	0	4	0
37	FW	(Germany) (Italy) Fabio Kaufmann	3+5	1	1	0	0	0	2+1	0	12	1
39	DF	(Thailand) Tanasith Siripala	0+1	0	1	0	0	0	0	0	2	0
44	DF	(Serbia) (Hungary) Marko Nikolić	5	0	0	0	0	0	1+1	0	7	0
45	FW	(Brazil) João Magno	3+3	2	0+1	0	0	0	1+1	0	9	2
47	DF	(Thailand) Nuttawut Wongsawang	0	0	0	0	0	0	0	0	0	0
48	DF	(Thailand) Waris Choolthong	7	0	0+1	0	0	0	1+1	0	10	0
49	GK	(Thailand) Nalawich Intacharoen	0	0	0	0	0	0	0	0	0	0
50	DF	(Luxembourg) (Montenegro) Edin Osmanovic	7+1	0	0	0	0	0	2+1	0	11	0
54	FW	(Thailand) Kongnat Thuamthongdee	0	0	0	0	0	0	0	0	0	0
62	DF	(Thailand) Runpiset Phutummee	0+2	0	0	0	0	0	0+2	0	4	0
67	MF	(Thailand) Suphanat Chaiprapha	0	0	0	0	0	0	0+1	0	1	0
72	MF	(Thailand) Krittapak Seangsawat	0	0	1	0	0	0	0	0	1	0
77	MF	(Thailand) Thanakorn Papaphe	0	0	0	0	0	0	0	0	0	0
79	MF	(Thailand) Witthawat Phraothaisong	0	0	0	0	0	0	0+1	0	1	0
91	FW	(Thailand) Ratthasat Buaban	2+1	1	0	0	0	0	1	1	4	2
92	DF	(Thailand) Thawatchai Inprakhon	0	0	0	0	0	0	0	0	0	0
Players who have left the club on loan to other club
8	MF	(Thailand) Ekanit Panya	0	0	0	0	0	0	0	0	0	0
14	FW	(Japan) Tomoyuki Doi	0	0	0	0	0	0	0	0	0	0
22	DF	(England) (Thailand) Nathan James	0	0	0	0	0	0	0	0	0	0
29	DF	(Thailand) Warinthon Jamnongwat	0	0	0	0	0	0	0	0	0	0
31	MF	(Thailand) Thawatchai Inprakhon	0	0	0	0	0	0	0	0	0	0
34	MF	(Thailand) Wachirawut Saenchek	0	0	0	0	0	0	0	0	0	0
39	MF	(Thailand) Thanakorn Papaphe	0	0	0	0	0	0	0	0	0	0
45	FW	(Thailand) Nattawut Suksum	0	0	0	0	0	0	0	0	0	0
59	MF	(Thailand) Anan Samaae	0	0	0	0	0	0	0	0	0	0
62	MF	(Thailand) Airfan Doloh	0	0	0	0	0	0	0	0	0	0
77	FW	(Thailand) Siwakorn Ponsan	0	0	0	0	0	0	0	0	0	0
??	DF	(Thailand) Khatawut Poladao	0	0	0	0	0	0	0	0	0	0
??	MF	(Thailand) Teerapat Pruetong	0	0	0	0	0	0	0	0	0	0
??	DF	(Thailand) Thanadol Kaosaart	0	0	0	0	0	0	0	0	0	0
Players who have played this season and/or sign for the season but had left the club permanently

== Competitions ==
=== Overview ===
Competition	First match	Last match	Starting round	Final position	Record							
Competition	First match	Last match	Starting round	Final position	Pld	W	D	L	GF	GA	GD	Win %
Thai League 1	4 September 2026		Matchday 1		8	3	3	2	12	8	+4	37.50
Thai FA Cup	21 October 2026		First round	First round	1	0	0	1	0	1	−1	0.00
Thai League Cup					0	0	0	0	0	0	+0	—
AFC Champions League Two	17 September 2026		Group stage		4	2	1	1	9	4	+5	50.00
Total					13	5	4	4	21	13	+8	38.46

Last updated: 8 November 2026
Source: Competitions

=== Thai League 1 ===
==== Matches ====
Win Draw Loss

4 September 2026 1	Pattani	0–0	BG Pathum United	Songkhla
		Report	Takahiro Yanagi (yellow card) 14'; Edin Osmanovic (yellow card) 20'	Stadium: Tinsulanon Stadium; Attendance: 17,300; Referee: Phairot Bunkamnoed

13 September 2026 2	BG Pathum United	3–2	Rasisalai United	Pathum Thani
	Raniel 2', 12' (pen.); Ryan Edwards (yellow card) 68'; João Magno 88' (yellow card) 89'	Report	Gilberto Macena 17', 36' (pen.); Matías Panigazzi (yellow card) 38'; Ramon Mesquita (yellow card) 90+1'; Supot Jodjam (red card) 90+6'	Stadium: True BG Stadium; Attendance: 8,501; Referee: Mongkolchai Pechsri

20 September 2026 3	Bangkok United	3–2	BG Pathum United	Pathum Thani
	Weerathep Pomphan 15' (yellow card) 38'; Everton 21' (yellow card) 23'; Willian Popp 90+8' (pen.); Pokklaw A-nan (yellow card) 26'; Suphan Thongsong (yellow card) 89'	Report	Raniel 35'; Pasqual Verkamp 43'; Marko Nikolic (yellow card) 21'; Fabio Kaufmann (yellow card) 90+10'	Stadium: True BG Stadium; Attendance: 3,697; Referee: Torphong Somsing

10 October 2026 4	BG Pathum United	1–1	Ayutthaya United	Pathum Thani
	Patrik Gustavsson 54'; Marko Nikolic (yellow card) 14'; Anthony Belmonte (yellow card) 26'; Fabio Kaufmann (yellow card) 90+3'	Report	Willen Mota 23'; Lucas Dias (yellow card) 34'; Diogo Brito (red card) 58'; Hyun-soo Hwang (yellow card) 64'; Yuki Kusano (yellow card) 65'; Bhumchanok Kamkla (yellow card) 84'; Passakorn Biaothungoi (yellow card) 85'	Stadium: True BG Stadium; Attendance: 6,533; Referee: Songkran Bunmeekiart

18 October 2026 5	Sisaket United	1–1	BG Pathum United	Sisaket
	Kittipong Wongma 90+3'; Patrick Valverde (yellow card) 75'; Isaac Honny (yellow card) 89'	Report	João Magno 45+3'; Elias Dolah (yellow card) 84'	Stadium: Sri Nakhon Lamduan Stadium; Attendance: 9,450; Referee: Narinnart Tiamskun

24 October 2026 6	BG Pathum United	2–0	Chiangrai United	Pathum Thani
	Ratthasat Buaban 5'; Fabio Kaufmann 61'; Ashley Coffey (yellow card) 38'; Sarach Yooyen (yellow card) 78'	Report	Ze Ricardo (red card) 28'; Dudu (yellow card) 45+1'	Stadium: True BG Stadium; Attendance: 7,150; Referee: Natee Choosuwan

2 November 2026 7	Chonburi	1–0	BG Pathum United	Chonburi
	Saharat Sontisawat 64'; Jorge Fellipe (yellow card) 31'; Stenio Júnior (yellow card) 61'		Edin Osmanovic (yellow card) 24'; Sarach Yooyen (yellow card) 62'; Chanapach Buaphan (yellow card) 74'; Chanathip Songkrasin (yellow card) 78'; Ashley Coffey (yellow card) 80'; Runpiset Phutummee (yellow card) 90+4'	Stadium: Chonburi Stadium; Attendance: 6,105; Referee: Mongkolchai Pechsri

8 November 2026 8	BG Pathum United	3–0	Rayong	Pathum Thani
	Leon James 22'; Mayron 41' (o.g.); Akarapong Pumwiset 52'; Chanathip Songkrasin (yellow card) 64'		João Afonso (yellow card) 44' (red card) 48'	Stadium: True BG Stadium; Attendance: 6,162; Referee: Chaiya Moolmanee

21 November 2026 9	Buriram United	–	BG Pathum United	Buriram
				Stadium: Chang Arena

3 January 2027 10 (Rescheduled)	BG Pathum United	–	Ratchaburi	Pathum Thani
				Stadium: True BG Stadium

6 December 2026 11	PT Prachuap	–	BG Pathum United	Prachuap
				Stadium: Sam Ao Stadium

13 December 2026 12	Uthai Thani	–	BG Pathum United	Uthai Thani
				Stadium: Uthai Thani Province Stadium

20 December 2026 13	BG Pathum United	–	Port	Pathum Thani
				Stadium: True BG Stadium

23 December 2026 14	Sukhothai	–	BG Pathum United	Sukhothai
				Stadium: Thalay Luang Stadium

27 December 2026 15	BG Pathum United	–	Lamphun Warriors	Pathum Thani
				Stadium: True BG Stadium

6 February 2027 16	Rasisalai United	v	Ratchaburi	Sisaket
				Stadium: Sisaket Provincial Stadium

14 February 2027 17 (Rescheduled)	BG Pathum United	–	Bangkok United	Pathum Thani
				Stadium: True BG Stadium

18 February 2027 18	Ayutthaya United	–	BG Pathum United	Ayutthaya
				Stadium: Ayutthaya Province Stadium

27 February 2027 19	BG Pathum United	–	Sisaket United	Pathum Thani
				Stadium: True BG Stadium

6 March 2027 20	Chiangrai United	–	BG Pathum United	Chiangrai
				Stadium: Singha Chiangrai Stadium

14 March 2027 21	BG Pathum United	–	Chonburi	Pathum Thani
				Stadium: True BG Stadium

21 March 2027 22	Rayong	–	Ratchaburi	Rayong
				Stadium: Rayong Province Stadium

8 April 2027 23	BG Pathum United	–	Buriram United	Pathum Thani
				Stadium: True BG Stadium

18 April 2027 24	Ratchaburi	–	BG Pathum United	Ratchaburi
				Stadium: Dragon Solar Park

25 April 2027 25	BG Pathum United	–	PT Prachuap	Pathum Thani
				Stadium: True BG Stadium

30 April 2027 26	BG Pathum United	–	Uthai Thani	Pathum Thani
				Stadium: True BG Stadium

8 May 2027 27	Port	–	BG Pathum United	Bangkok
				Stadium: PAT Stadium

16 May 2027 28	BG Pathum United	–	Sukhothai	Pathum Thani
				Stadium: True BG Stadium

23 May 2027 29	Lamphun Warriors	–	BG Pathum United	Lamphun
				Stadium: Lamphun Warriors Stadium

30 May 2027 30	BG Pathum United	–	Pattani	Pathum Thani
				Stadium: True BG Stadium

Pos	Team	Pld	W	D	L	GF	GA	GD	Pts
7	Ratchaburi	9	4	1	4	18	11	+7	13
8	Sukhothai	9	4	1	4	15	17	−2	13
9	BG Pathum United	8	3	3	2	12	8	+4	12
10	Lamphun Warriors	9	3	2	4	12	15	−3	11
11	Rayong	9	3	2	4	10	18	−8	11

Updated to match(es) played on 22 November 2026. Source: Thai League 1 2026–27
Rules for classification: 1) Points; 2) Goal difference; 3) Goals scored.

=== Thai FA Cup ===
Win Draw Loss

21 October 2026 Rd of 64	Khon Kaen United	1–0	BG Pathum United	Khon Kaen
	Allen Carneva 15'; Jiradet Taichankong (yellow card) 83'; Settawut Wongsai (yellow card) 90+3'			Stadium: Khon Kaen Provincial Administrative Organization Stadium; Attendance: 4,267; Referee: Peerasan Krataithong

=== Thai League Cup ===
8-10 December 2026 Rd of 32	F.C. Yala	–	BG Pathum United	Yala
				Stadium: Yala City Municipality Stadium

=== AFC Champions League Two ===
Pos	Team	Pld	W	D	L	GF	GA	GD	Pts	Qualification	LCS	BGP	ADE	TPF
1	(Singapore) Lion City Sailors	4	3	1	0	9	1	+8	10	Advance to round of 16	—	1–1	5–0	–
2	(Thailand) BG Pathum United	4	2	1	1	9	4	+5	7	Advance to round of 16	–	—	1–2	4–1
3	(Australia) Adelaide United	4	2	0	2	5	8	−3	6		0–2	–	—	3–0
4	(Hong Kong) Tai Po (E)	4	0	0	4	1	11	−10	0		0–1	0–3	–	—

Updated to match(es) played on 5 November 2026. Source: ACL2
Rules for classification: Tiebreakers
(E) Eliminated

17 September 2026 1	Lion City Sailors (Singapore)	1–1	(Thailand) BG Pathum United	Jalan Besar, Singapore
	Marko Nikolić 24' (o.g.); Song Ui-young (yellow card) 34'; Toni Datković (yellow card) 35'	Report	Patrik Gustavsson 51'; Edin Osmanovic (yellow card) 24'; Surachat Sareepim (yellow card) 75'; Elijah Dolah (yellow card) 82'	Stadium: Jalan Besar Stadium; Attendance: 1,853; Referee: Resul Mämmedow (Turkmenistan)

15 October 2026 2	BG Pathum United (Thailand)	1–2	(Australia) Adelaide United	Pathum Thani, Thailand
	Marin Jurina 2'; Sarach Yooyen (yellow card) 55'; Anthony Belmonte (yellow card) 80'	Report	Craig Goodwin 10'; Ethan Alagich 77'; Anselmo (yellow card) 59'; Panagiotis Kikianis (yellow card) 70'; Ajak Riak (yellow card) 89'	Stadium: Pathum Thani Stadium; Attendance: 4,317; Referee: Mohammed Al-Shammari (Qatar)

29 October 2026 3	Tai Po (Hong Kong)	0–3	(Thailand) BG Pathum United	Mong Kok, Hong Kong
	Weverton (yellow card) 11'; Murilo Gabriel (yellow card) 70'; Gabriel Cividini (yellow card) 85'	Report	Anthony Belmonte 27'; Hugo Rama 32'; Ratthasat Buaban 41'; Yeferson Quintana (yellow card) 51'	Stadium: Mong Kok Stadium; Attendance: 1,502; Referee: Meder Tayçiev (Kyrgyzstan)

5 November 2026 4	BG Pathum United (Thailand)	4–1	(Hong Kong) Tai Po	Pathum Thani, Thailand
	Marin Jurina 14', 37', 57'; Matheus Costa 63'; Witthawat Phraothaisong (yellow card) 83'; Ashley Coffey (yellow card) 90+2'	Report	Wallisson Bahia 70'; Sim Seung-Hyeon (yellow card) 33'	Stadium: Pathum Thani Stadium; Attendance: 4,963; Referee: Baraa Aisha (Palestine)

25 November 2026 5	BG Pathum United (Thailand)	–	(Singapore) Lion City Sailors	Pathum Thani, Thailand
		Report		Stadium: Pathum Thani Stadium

3 December 2026 6	Adelaide United (Australia)	–	(Thailand) BG Pathum United	Adelaide, Australia
		Report		Stadium: Hindmarsh Stadium
