= 2017 Thai FA Cup =

Chang FA Cup

Tournament details
- Country: Thailand
- Dates: 5 April 2017 – 25 November 2017
- Teams: 74

Final positions
- Champions: Chiangrai United (1st title)
- Runners-up: Bangkok United

Tournament statistics
- Matches played: 73
- Goals scored: 253 (3.47 per match)
- Top goal scorer(s): Felipe Azevedo (6 goals)

The 2017 Thai FA Cup is the 24th season of a Thailand's knockout football competition. It was sponsored by Chang, and known as the Chang FA Cup (Thai: ช้าง เอฟเอคัพ) for sponsorship purposes. The tournament is organized by the Football Association of Thailand. 74 clubs were accepted into the tournament, and it began with the qualification round on 5 April 2017, and concluded with the final on 25 November 2017. The winner would have qualified for the 2018 AFC Champions League preliminary round 2 and the 2018 Thailand Champions Cup.

== Calendar ==
Round	Date	Matches	Clubs	New entries this round
Qualification round	5 April 2017	10	4 + 6 + 3 + 7 → 10	7 2017 Thai League 2; 3 2017 Thai League 3; 6 2017 Thai League 4; 4 2017 Thai Amateur Tournament
First round	21 June 2017	32	10 + 4 + 12 + 10 + 10 + 18 → 32	18 2017 Thai League; 10 2017 Thai League 2; 10 2017 Thai League 3; 12 2017 Thai League 4; 4 2017 Thai Amateur Tournament
Second round	2 August 2017	16	32 → 16	
Third round	27 September 2017	8	16 → 8	
Quarter-finals	18 October 2017	4	8 → 4	
Semi-finals	1 November 2017	2	4 → 2	
Final	25 November 2017	1	2 → Champions	
Total				74 clubs

== Results ==
=== Qualification round ===
Qualification round for teams currently playing in the 2017 Thai League 2, 2017 Thai League 3, 2017 Thai League 4 and 2017 Thai Football Amateur Tournament. Qualification round had drawn on 17 March 2017 by FA Thailand. Every match in this round was held on 5 April 2017.

5 April 2017	Surin City (T4)	1–0	Sing Ubon (T5)	Surin
16:00 (UTC+7)	Nitikorn Sirichu 34'	Report		Stadium: Sri Narong Stadium; Attendance: 107; Referee: Arin Promthep

5 April 2017	Samut Prakan (T4)	4–1	BCC (T4)	Samut Prakan
16:00 (UTC+7)	Gabriel Mintah 2', 47', 75'; Ekkarat Charoenkul 69'	Report	Kittiwaut Bualoy 85'	Stadium: Samut Prakarn SAT Stadium; Attendance: 200; Referee: Montree Suripol

5 April 2017	Muang Loei United (T4)	1–0	Dontan PCCM (T5)	Loei
16:00 (UTC+7)	Tawan Somboon 70'	Report		Stadium: Wang Saphung District Stadium; Attendance: 283; Referee: Somkid Sarapim

5 April 2017	Army United (T2)	1–0	Udon Thani (T3)	Bangkok
18:00 (UTC+7)	Pongsuriyan Aebfang 80'	Report		Stadium: Thai Army Sports Stadium; Attendance: 483; Referee: Sorapong Krainet

5 April 2017	Krabi (T2)	1–1 (2–4 p)	Lampang (T2)	Krabi
18:00 (UTC+7)	Jirawut Saranan 45'	Report	Sarawut Kongcharoen 79'	Stadium: Krabi Provincial Stadium; Attendance: 509; Referee: Songkran Bunmeekiat
	Penalties
	Pongsaton Meesa (penalty missed); Suchart Chayyai (penalty scored); Shinawatra Tawitsang (penalty missed); Supot Jodjam (penalty scored)		(penalty scored) Jirawat Makarom; (penalty missed) Sarawut Kongcharoen; (penalty scored) Chennarong Wongnoi; (penalty scored) Piyawit Janput; (penalty scored) Boonkerd Chaiyasin

5 April 2017	BBCU (T2)	1–2	Air Force Central (T2)	Nonthaburi
18:00 (UTC+7)	Naret Ritpitakwong 83'	Report	Tanongsak Promdard 45'; Yodsak Chaowana 87'	Stadium: Nonthaburi Municipality Honorary Stadium; Attendance: 435; Referee: Thaweep Inkaew

5 April 2017	Trat (T2)	7–3	Nakhon Pathom United (T2)	Trat
18:00 (UTC+7)	Barros Tardeli 5', 9', 20', 31'; Erivaldo Oliveira 72', 84' (pen.); Yoon Si-ho 74'	Report	Yod Chanthawong 7'; Gaston Castaño 67'; Anon Sangsanoi 69' (pen.)	Stadium: Trat Provincial Stadium; Attendance: 550; Referee: Veerapol Laosuphan

5 April 2017	Muangkan United (T4)	0–1	Customs United (T3)	Kanchanaburi
18:00 (UTC+7)		Report	Kimiaki Kinomura 35'	Stadium: Kanchanaburi Provincial Stadium; Attendance: 254; Referee: Tossapornsilp Sitthisema

5 April 2017	Phatthalung (T4)	0–0 (4–2 p)	Wangpailom Sport Club (T5)	Phatthalung
18:00 (UTC+7)		Report		Stadium: Phatthalung Provincial Stadium; Attendance: 289; Referee: Wichai Pannin
	Penalties
	Cherif Mamy (penalty scored); Supach Sripatiyutwong (penalty scored); Endo Shiyu (penalty scored); Dech-anan Daengmanee (penalty scored)		(penalty scored) Montree Krueaiam; (penalty scored) Marut Ahmuhamadpraserd; (penalty missed) Amin Pasalay; (penalty missed) Amontep Ngamsa-ard

5 April 2017	Chainat United (T5)	1–1 (5–3 p)	Chachoengsao (T3)	Chai Nat
18:00 (UTC+7)	Phuwanat Rueangsri 20'	Report	Dominique Nyamsi Jacques 90+1'	Stadium: Khao Plong Stadium; Attendance: 100; Referee: Kritsada Luangyos
	Penalties
	Kritsarin Chinasri (penalty scored); Weerapat Kaewwongsa (penalty scored); Panuwat Somjai (penalty scored); Surabodee ratcharoen (penalty scored); Sirichai Sangthong (penalty scored)		(penalty scored) Kritsakorn Kasai-ngern; (penalty scored) Padungsak Phonak; (penalty missed) Manop Srisamran; (penalty scored) Chanwit Sritham

=== First round ===
The first round will be featured by ten clubs which were the winners of the qualification round and fifty-four clubs from 2017 Thai League 1, 2017 Thai League 2, 2017 Thai League 3, 2017 Thai League 4 and 2017 Thai Football Amateur Tournament. First round had drawn on 5 June 2017 by FA Thailand. The first round was held on 21 June 2017.

21 June 2017	JL Chiangmai United (T4)	2–0	Royal Thai Army (T3)	Chiangmai
15:30 (UTC+7)	Phichai Tongwilas 19', 43'	Report		Stadium: Maejo University Stadium; Attendance: 213; Referee: Kasama Loima

21 June 2017	Yala United (T4)	0–2	Army United (T2)	Yala
15:30 (UTC+7)		Report	Watcharaphol Photanorm 40', 75'	Stadium: Jaru Stadium; Attendance: 380; Referee: Manop Lempan

21 June 2017	Krung Thonburi (T3)	1–2	Navy (T1)	Nakhon Pathom
15:30 (UTC+7)	Tatsuya Fujioka 54'	Report	Suttipong Laoporn 26', 47'	Stadium: Mahidol University Stadium Salaya; Attendance: 362; Referee: Wiwat Jampa-on

21 June 2017	Loei City (T4)	1–1 (a.e.t.) (5–4 p)	Songkhla United (T2)	Loei
15:30 (UTC+7)	Traiphop Somwang 109' (pen.)	Report	Teerawat Durnee 115'	Stadium: Loei Rajabhat University Stadium; Attendance: 54; Referee: Rapatsak Saowiboon
	Penalties
	Traiphop Somwang (penalty scored); Akarawit Saemaram (penalty scored); Nitirat Wiangdindam (penalty scored); Panupong Suwachai (penalty scored); Kiattisak Riencharoen (penalty scored)		(penalty scored) Giorgi Tsimakuridze; (penalty scored) Teerawat Durnee; (penalty missed) Jakkapong Yaito; (penalty scored) Thaweesap Srinuannoi; (penalty scored) David Silva

21 June 2017	Surin City (T4)	1–2	Lampang (T2)	Surin
15:30 (UTC+7)	Sathorn Junserm 58'	Report	David Bala 48' (pen.); Arsan Pengbanrai 88'	Stadium: Sri Narong Stadium; Attendance: 130; Referee: Soraphong Krainet

21 June 2017	Ranong United (T3)	1–1 (a.e.t.) (1–2 p)	Sisaket (T1)	Ranong
16:00 (UTC+7)	Sanou Oumar 14'	Report	Yaseen Harnjit 29' (o.g.)	Stadium: Ranong Provincial Stadium; Attendance: 500; Referee: Wittaya Saraket
	Penalties
	Kittithach Kraithong (penalty missed); Jakreephan Ketnadin (penalty missed); Sanou Oumar (penalty scored); Varin Supa (penalty missed); Chaiwat Ritthisak (penalty missed)		(penalty scored) Leroy Lita; (penalty missed) Yuttana Ruangsuksut; (penalty scored) Tadpong Lar-tham; (penalty missed) Theerachai Ngamcharoen; (penalty missed) Mariano Berriex

21 June 2017	Kohkwang Subdistrict Municipality (T5)	1–3	Chanthaburi (T4)	Chanthaburi
16:00 (UTC+7)	Anon Duksee 10'	Report	Mbassegus Mbarga 11'; Park Young-jin 70'; Tirawut Tiwato 80'	Stadium: Chanthaburi PAO. Stadium; Referee: Yutthana Nima

21 June 2017	Grakcu Looktabfah Pathum Thani (T4)	2–3	Samut Prakan (T4)	Pathum Thani
16:00 (UTC+7)	Pakawat Sakulpong 39', 71'	Report	Gabriel Mintah 43'; Phakpoom Malirungruang 89' (pen.); Dennis Borketey 90+3'	Stadium: Thupatemee Stadium; Attendance: 150; Referee: Viritpol Pleumsil

21 June 2017	Rajpracha (T3)	3–4	BEC Tero Sasana (T1)	Bangkok
16:00 (UTC+7)	Rewat Meerian 45+2', 70'; Zalla Abdoulaye Nicholas 73'	Report	Seksit Srisai 38'; Teeraphol Yoryoei 44'; Michaël N'dri 62', 90+1'	Stadium: Thonburi University Stadium; Attendance: 105; Referee: Prapot Ditsomsri

21 June 2017	Chiangrai United (T1)	9–0	BTU United (T4)	Chiangrai
17:30 (UTC+7)	Akarawin Sawasdee 20', 32', 45'; Felipe Azevedo 23', 38'; Pathompol Charoenrattanapirom 26', 70'; Sivakorn Tiatrakul 58'; Vander Luiz 73'	Report		Stadium: Singha Stadium; Attendance: 421; Referee: Jaktrawut Junlamart

21 June 2017	Trat (T2)	2–1	Air Force Central (T2)	Trat
18:00 (UTC+7)	Sirisak Masbu-ngor 2', 56'	Report	Surachai Chawna 38'	Stadium: Trat Provincial Stadium; Attendance: 563; Referee: Phichit Nasuwan

21 June 2017	Prachuap (T2)	7–0	Kasetsart (T2)	Prachuap Khiri Khan
18:00 (UTC+7)	Nascimento dos Santos Neto 23' (pen.), 72', 88' (pen.); Sutee Chantorn 39'; Aleksandar Vujačić 54', 90'; Apirat Heemkhao 69'	Report		Stadium: Sam Ao Stadium; Attendance: 199; Referee: Taweep Inkaew

21 June 2017	Nongbua Pitchaya (T2)	1–0	Marines Eureka (T4)	Nongbua Lamphu
18:00 (UTC+7)	Masaya Jitozono 46'	Report		Stadium: Nongbua Lamphu Provincial Stadium; Attendance: 1,202; Referee: Sanook Soongkhaw

21 June 2017	Thai Honda Ladkrabang (T1)	10–0	Muangchang United (Out of league)	Bangkok
18:00 (UTC+7)	Narin Channarong 14', 64'; Baramee Limwattana 28'; Suppasek Kaikaew 45+2', 56', 69', 73'; Ritthidet Phensawat 52'; Sananchai Panpai 85'; Diego Assis 87'	Report		Stadium: 72nd Anniversary Stadium (Min Buri); Attendance: 572; Referee: Chaiyaporn Yongsaeng

21 June 2017	Kalasin (T3)	1–1 (a.e.t.) (3–5 p)	Suphanburi (T1)	Kalasin
18:00 (UTC+7)	Roberto Hinkra 35'	Report	Nicolás Vélez 72'	Stadium: Kalasin Town municipality Stadium; Attendance: 796; Referee: Veeraphol Laosuphan
	Penalties
	Martin Muwanga (penalty scored); Yongyut Jareonpoom (penalty missed); Caio Rodrigues da Cruz (penalty scored); Phattana Phommathep (penalty scored)		(penalty scored) Guilherme Dellatorre; (penalty scored) Prasit Jantum; (penalty scored) Janepob Phokie; (penalty scored) Rangsan Viwatchaichok; (penalty scored) Nicolás Vélez

21 June 2017	Samut Songkhram (T2)	4–1 (a.e.t.)	Isan Pattaya (T5)	Samut Songkhram
18:00 (UTC+7)	Warayut Klomnak 38'; Kim Moon-ju 96', 116'; Sittichai Panku 120'	Report	Nipon Thong-ancha 36'	Stadium: Samut Songkhram PAO. Stadium; Attendance: 199; Referee: Kriangsak Kiatsongkram

21 June 2017	Customs United (T3)	1–2	Rayong (T2)	Samut Prakan
18:00 (UTC+7)	Rodrigo Silva 63'	Report	Nattasap Wongwien 29'; Seiya Sugishita 84'	Stadium: Lad Krabang 54 Stadium; Attendance: 200; Referee: Krittachai Saenmart

21 June 2017	Khonkaen (T3)	2–0	Phrae United (T3)	Khonkaen
18:00 (UTC+7)	Richard Cardozo 71'; Charin Boodhad 78'	Report		Stadium: Khonkaen PAO. Stadium; Attendance: 2,238; Referee: Damrong Wangraha

21 June 2017	PTT Rayong (T2)	4–0	Bangkok (T2)	Rayong
18:00 (UTC+7)	Jetsadakorn Hemdaeng 59'; Goshi Okubo 72' (pen.); Chinnawat Wongchai 88'; Woo Geun-jeong 90+3' (pen.)	Report		Stadium: PTT Stadium; Attendance: 876; Referee: Peeratat Kittikanmetee

21 June 2017	Samut Sakhon (T3)	2–0	Uttaradit (T4)	Samut Sakhon
18:00 (UTC+7)	Welington Adao Gomes 45+2'; Chatchai Jiakklang 90+2'	Report		Stadium: Samut Sakhon Provincial Stadium; Attendance: 385; Referee: Payungkij Kijjaroen

21 June 2017	Ayutthaya United (T3)	3–2	Chonburi (T1)	Ayutthaya
18:00 (UTC+7)	Kendall Jagdeosingh 63', 79' (pen.); Somprasong Chuenjan 88'	Report	Nurul Sriyankem 35'; Prince Amponsah 44'	Stadium: Ayutthaya Provincial Stadium; Attendance: 1,244; Referee: Suwat Wongsuwan

21 June 2017	Pluakdaeng Rayong United (T4)	1–1 (a.e.t.) (5–4 p)	Ubon UMT United (T1)	Rayong
18:00 (UTC+7)	Pradit Chuaisuk 50'	Report	Carlão 29' (pen.)	Stadium: Rayong Provincial Stadium; Attendance: 935; Referee: Songkran Bunmeekiat
	Penalties
	Sarawut Saysing (penalty scored); Klanarong Mingkhwun (penalty scored); Pratya Narach (penalty scored); Diogo Figueira (penalty scored); Aphichet Saisao (penalty scored)		(penalty scored) Carlão; (penalty scored) Bajram Nebihi; (penalty scored) Jakkit Niyomsuk; (penalty scored) Anukorn Sangrum; (penalty missed) Kenta Yamazaki

21 June 2017	Phitsanulok (T4)	3–2 (a.e.t.)	Phatthalung (T4)	Phitsanulok
18:00 (UTC+7)	Bayano Sobze Henai 11'; Diarra Aboubacar Sidick 34'; Rachen Kunkong 99'	Report	Decha Wadtan 49'; Nsapit Henri Joel 76'	Stadium: Phitsanulok PAO. Stadium; Attendance: 624; Referee: Jirayut Kasiphol

21 June 2017	Chiangmai (T2)	3–2	Super Power Samut Prakan (T1)	Chiangmai
19:00 (UTC+7)	Kim Hyo-jin 15'; Apiwat Pengprakone 20'; Wicha Nantasri 22'	Report	Ronnachai Rangsiyo 24'; Ramsés Bustos 54' (pen.)	Stadium: Chiangmai Municipality Stadium; Attendance: 1,022; Referee: Sivakorn Pu-udom

21 June 2017	SCG Muangthong United (T1)	3–0	Muang Loei United (T4)	Nonthaburi
19:00 (UTC+7)	Leandro Assumpção 8'; Célio 43'; Mongkol Tossakrai 90+1'	Report		Stadium: SCG Stadium; Attendance: 4,017; Referee: Nitipoom Kullabut

21 June 2017	Ratchaburi Mitr Phol (T1)	0–1	Buriram United (T1)	Ratchaburi
19:00 (UTC+7)		Report	Jajá Coelho 74'	Stadium: Mitr Phol Stadium; Attendance: 6,364; Referee: Mongkolchai Pechsri

21 June 2017	Port (T1)	5–0	Royal Thai Fleet (T4)	Bangkok
19:00 (UTC+7)	Josimar 3', 52'; Piyachat Srimarueang 16'; Elias Dolah 23', 90+2'	Report		Stadium: PAT Stadium; Attendance: 1,014; Referee: Anusorn Nookaew

21 June 2017	Bangkok Glass (T1)	6–0	Pibulsongkram Rajabhat University (T5)	Pathum Thani
19:00 (UTC+7)	Apisit Sorada 30'; Chalermsak Aukkee 42'; Ariel Rodríguez 59'; Sakeereen Teekasom 83'; Surachat Sareepim 87'; Nattapon Thep-uthai 90'	Report		Stadium: Leo Stadium; Attendance: 522; Referee: Varintorn Satsadee

21 June 2017	Pattaya United (T1)	1–1 (a.e.t.) (4–3 p)	Chainat Hornbill (T2)	Chonburi
19:00 (UTC+7)	Sarawut Kanlayanabandit 40'	Report	Sinama Pongolle 37'	Stadium: Nong Prue Stadium; Attendance: 1,256; Referee: Torphong Somsing
	Penalties
	Supravee Miprathang (penalty scored); Chayawat Srinawong (penalty scored); Wellington Priori (penalty scored); Wongsakorn Chaikultewin (penalty scored)		(penalty scored) Sinama Pongolle; (penalty missed) Diego Emilio Silva; (penalty scored) Park Jong-oh; (penalty scored) Gorka Unda; (penalty missed) Laksana Kamruen

21 June 2017	Sukhothai (T1)	7–0	Chainat United (T5)	Sukhothai
19:00 (UTC+7)	Kiattisak Toopkhuntod 16'; Lursan Thiamrat 45+1', 77'; Sakdarin Mingsamorn 61'; Kritsana Kasemkulvilai 72', 80', 84'	Report		Stadium: Thung Thalay Luang Stadium; Attendance: 2,080; Referee: Chaoroek Ngamsom

21 June 2017	Nakhon Ratchasima Mazda (T1)	5–0	Nakhon Si Thammarat Unity (T3)	Nakhon Ratchasima
19:00 (UTC+7)	Ekkanat Kongket 6'; Dominic Adiyiah 8'; Paulo Rangel 30' (pen.), 37', 45+2' (pen.)	Report		Stadium: 80th Birthday Stadium; Attendance: 1,158; Referee: Sahaphop Sribunlue

21 June 2017	Chiangrai City (T4)	1–5	Bangkok United (T1)	Chiangrai
20:00 (UTC+7)	Nantawat Tansopa 50'	Report	Dragan Bošković 18'; Teeratep Winothai 27', 41', 45+1'; Sathaporn Daengsee 90+2'	Stadium: Chiangrai Province Stadium; Attendance: 200; Referee: Nathee Choosuwan

=== Second round ===
The second round will be featured by thirty-two clubs which were the winners of the first round. Second round had drawn on 13 July 2017 by FA Thailand. The second round was held on 2 August 2017.

2 August 2017	Loei City (T4)	2–3 (a.e.t.)	Rayong (T2)	Loei
15:30 (UTC+7)	Mamadou Bamba 11'; Nitirat Wiangdindam 20'	Report	Thongchai Ratchai 39'; Pradipat Armatantri 56'; Wittawin Atthapratyamuang 101'	Stadium: Loei Rajabhat University Stadium; Attendance: 101; Referee: Manas Pimol

2 August 2017	JL Chiangmai United (T4)	2–1	Khonkaen (T3)	Chiangmai
15:30 (UTC+7)	Wasan Chomkesorn 9'; Chatchai Nakvijit 45+2' (pen.)	Report	Charin Boodhad 90+1'	Stadium: Maejo University Stadium; Attendance: 270; Referee: Noppadech Muang-ngam

2 August 2017	Buriram United (T1)	5–1	Phitsanulok (T4)	Buriram
18:00 (UTC+7)	Jajá Coelho 17', 44'; Go Seul-ki 45+1'; Supachok Sarachat 56'; Diogo Luís Santo 90'	Report	Diarra Aboubacar Sidick 59'	Stadium: i-mobile Stadium; Attendance: 5,088; Referee: Ketdamrong Khemthong

2 August 2017	Prachuap (T2)	4–0	Sisaket (T1)	Prachuap Khiri Khan
18:00 (UTC+7)	Chanrit Nuhtong 40'; Laércio Gomes Costa 45', 77'; Yusei Ogasawara 90+1'	Report		Stadium: Sam Ao Stadium; Attendance: 530; Referee: Anusorn Nookaew

2 August 2017	Pluakdaeng Rayong United (T4)	0–1	Nongbua Pitchaya (T2)	Rayong
18:00 (UTC+7)		Report	Dai Min-joo 64'	Stadium: Rayong Provincial Stadium; Attendance: 210; Referee: Kritsada Luangyos

2 August 2017	Lampang (T2)	1–0	Samut Prakan (T4)	Lampang
18:00 (UTC+7)	Siriwat Sinturak 86'	Report		Stadium: Lampang Provincial Stadium; Attendance: 815; Referee: Bunsong Prachumrak

2 August 2017	Samut Sakhon (T3)	0–3	Samut Songkhram (T2)	Samut Sakhon
18:00 (UTC+7)		Report	Thiago Santos 41'; Phuwadol Suwannachart 67'; Kim Moon-ju 80'	Stadium: Samut Sakhon Provincial Stadium; Attendance: 1,215; Referee: Prakit Sukyang

2 August 2017	Trat (T2)	1–4	Army United (T2)	Trat
18:00 (UTC+7)	Barros Tardeli 55' (pen.)	Report	Wannaphon Buspakom 14'; Tanakorn Dangthong 20'; Oliveira Alves Diego 31'; Attapon Kannoo 45+1'	Stadium: Trat Provincial Stadium; Attendance: 659; Referee: Winad Popat

2 August 2017	Chanthaburi (T4)	0–3	Suphanburi (T1)	Chanthaburi
18:00 (UTC+7)		Report	Dellatorre 34'; Nicolás Vélez 45+2'; Elizeu 61'	Stadium: Chanthaburi PAO. Stadium; Attendance: 1,725; Referee: Veerapol Laosuphan

2 August 2017	Pattaya United (T1)	0–1	PTT Rayong (T2)	Chonburi
19:00 (UTC+7)		Report	Woo Geun-jeong 83'	Stadium: Nong Prue Stadium; Attendance: 2,306; Referee: Pummarin Khamruen

2 August 2017	Bangkok Glass (T1)	6–1	Navy (T1)	Pathum Thani
19:00 (UTC+7)	Piyachanok Darit 10'; Surachat Sareepim 23'; Jurato Ikeda 32'; Jhasmani Campos 52', 63', 67'	Report	Pisansin Za-in 44'	Stadium: Leo Stadium; Attendance: 444; Referee: Chairoek Ngamsom

2 August 2017	Chiangmai (T2)	1–2	SCG Muangthong United (T1)	Chiangmai
19:00 (UTC+7)	Apiwat Pengprakone 16'	Report	Wicha Nantasri 75' (o.g.); Heberty 85'	Stadium: Chiangmai Municipality Stadium; Attendance: 3,400; Referee: Natee Choosuwan

2 August 2017	Port (T1)	2–0	Ayutthaya United (T3)	Bangkok
19:00 (UTC+7)	Josimar 58', 90+4'	Report		Stadium: PAT Stadium; Attendance: 1,860; Referee: Terdsak Thongklam

2 August 2017	Sukhothai (T1)	0–1	Chiangrai United (T1)	Sukhothai
19:00 (UTC+7)		Report	Felipe Azevedo 62'	Stadium: Thung Thalay Luang Stadium; Attendance: 2,028; Referee: Wisawet Sangnakhon

2 August 2017	BEC Tero Sasana (T1)	2–1 (a.e.t.)	Thai Honda Ladkrabang (T1)	Bangkok
19:00 (UTC+7)	Phuwanart Khamkaew 20'; Michaël N'dri 118'	Report	Ricardo Jesus 84'	Stadium: Police Stadium; Attendance: 285; Referee: Chaiyaporn Yongsaeng

2 August 2017	Bangkok United (T1)	3–0	Nakhon Ratchasima Mazda (T1)	Pathum Thani
19:00 (UTC+7)	Dragan Bošković 54'; Jaycee John 71'; Teeratep Winothai 85'	Report		Stadium: Thammasat Stadium; Attendance: 1,077; Referee: Torpong Somsing

=== Third round ===
The third round will be featured by sixteen clubs which were the winners of the second round; including eight clubs from T1, seven clubs from T2, and one club from T4. The draw for the third round was held on 12 September 2017, at the Rajpruek club in Bangkok. All matches of this round was held on 27 September 2017.

27 September 2017	JL Chiangmai United (T4)	2–0 (a.e.t.)	Samut Songkhram (T2)	Chiangmai
18:00 (UTC+7)	Taku Ito 103'; Sonthanat Wongchai 114'	Report		Stadium: Chiangmai Municipality Stadium; Attendance: 487; Referee: Ketdamrong Khemthong

27 September 2017	Nongbua Pitchaya (T2)	3–0	Prachuap (T2)	Nongbua Lamphu
18:00 (UTC+7)	Sarawut Sintupun 30'; Weerayut Sriwichai 86'; Tatree Seeha 88'	Report		Stadium: Nongbua Lamphu Provincial Stadium; Attendance: 1,384; Referee: Teetichai Nualchan

27 September 2017	Bangkok Glass (T1)	0–2	Buriram United (T1)	Pathum Thani
19:00 (UTC+7)		Report	Diogo 11', 90+1'	Stadium: Leo Stadium; Attendance: 4,023; Referee: Mongkolchai Pechsri

27 September 2017	Army United (T2)	1–1 (a.e.t.) (6–7 p)	PTT Rayong (T2)	Bangkok
19:00 (UTC+7)	Marcos Vinícius 18'	Report	Woo Geun-jeong 34'	Stadium: Thai Army Sports Stadium; Attendance: 150; Referee: Paisal Bendem-alee
	Penalties
	Rodrigo Frauches (penalty scored); Apisorn Phumchat (penalty scored); Marcos Vinícius (penalty scored); Tanakorn Dangthong (penalty scored); Milad Zeneyedpour (penalty scored); Wannaphon Buspakom (penalty scored); Watcharapol Photanom (penalty missed)		(penalty scored) Goshi Okubo; (penalty scored) Dennis Murillo; (penalty scored) Arthit Sunthornpit; (penalty scored) Saharat Kanyaroj; (penalty scored) Adisak Hantes; (penalty scored) Rangsan Wiroonsri; (penalty scored) Nattapon Woratayanan

27 September 2017	SCG Muangthong United (T1)	5–0	Lampang (T2)	Nonthaburi
19:00 (UTC+7)	Adisak Kraisorn 15' (pen.); Heberty Fernandes 58', 78', 90+3'; Leandro Assumpção 84'	Report		Stadium: SCG Stadium; Attendance: 2,543; Referee: Chairoek Ngamsom

27 September 2017	Rayong (T2)	0–3	Suphanburi (T1)	Rayong
19:00 (UTC+7)		Report	Nicolás Vélez 46'; Lazarus Kaimbi 62', 90'	Stadium: Rayong Provincial Stadium; Attendance: 850; Referee: Natee Choosuwan

27 September 2017	Bangkok United (T1)	5–1	Port (T1)	Pathum Thani
19:00 (UTC+7)	Todsapol Lated 11' (o.g.); Dragan Bošković 16'; Jaycee John 37', 90+2' (pen.); Mika Chunuonsee 55'	Report	Genki Nagasato 8'	Stadium: Thammasat Stadium; Attendance: 1,715; Referee: Sivakorn Pu-udom

27 September 2017	Chiangrai United (T1)	3–1 (a.e.t.)	BEC Tero Sasana (T1)	Chiangrai
19:00 (UTC+7)	Felipe Azevedo 99', 109'; Vander Luiz 117' (pen.)	Report	Michaël N'dri 120'	Stadium: Singha Stadium; Attendance: 1,160; Referee: Songkran Boonmeekiat

=== Quarter-finals ===
The quarter-finals will be featured by eight clubs which were the winners of the third round; including five clubs from T1, two clubs from T2, and one club from T4. Quarter-finals had drawn on 11 October 2017 at the Rajpruek club in Bangkok. All matches of this round was held on 18 October 2017.

18 October 2017	JL Chiangmai United (T4)	2–1	Nongbua Pitchaya (T2)	Chiangmai
15:30 (UTC+7)	Chatchai Nakvijit 28' (pen.), 31'	Report	Tatree Seeha 60'	Stadium: Chiangmai Municipality Stadium; Attendance: 863; Referee: Wisawet Sangnakorn

18 October 2017	PTT Rayong (T2)	0–1	SCG Muangthong United (T1)	Rayong
18:00 (UTC+7)		Report	Teerasil Dangda 67'	Stadium: PTT Stadium; Attendance: 6,074; Referee: Titichai Nuanchan

18 October 2017	Suphanburi (T1)	0–1 (a.e.t.)	Bangkok United (T1)	Suphanburi
18:00 (UTC+7)		Report	Dragan Bošković 113'	Stadium: Suphanburi Provincial Stadium; Attendance: 1,812; Referee: Torpong Somsing

18 October 2017	Chiangrai United (T1)	1–0	Buriram United (T1)	Chiangrai
19:00 (UTC+7)	Felipe Azevedo 81'	Report		Stadium: Singha Stadium; Attendance: 6,029; Referee: Sivakorn Pu-udom

=== Semi-finals ===
The semi-finals will be featured by four clubs which were the winners of the quarter-finals round, including three clubs from T1 and one club from T4. Semi-finals had drawn on 19 October 2017 at the Rajpruek club in Bangkok. All matches of this round was held on 1 November 2017.

1 November 2017	Chiangrai United (T1)	2–2 (a.e.t.) (4–3 p)	SCG Muangthong United (T1)	Bangkok
19:00 (UTC+7)	Suriya Singmui 53'; Sivakorn Tiatrakul 73'	Report	Charyl Chappuis 84'; Heberty 87'	Stadium: Rajamangala Stadium; Attendance: 6,680; Referee: Songkran Boonmeekiat
	Penalties
	Felipe Azevedo (penalty scored); Suriya Singmui (penalty missed); Everton (penalty scored); Rafael Coelho (penalty missed); Chatchai Budprom (penalty scored); Chaiyawat Buran (penalty scored)		(penalty scored) Charyl Chappuis; (penalty missed) Leandro Assumpção; (penalty missed) Theerathon Bunmathan; (penalty scored) Sarach Yooyen; (penalty scored) Heberty; (penalty missed) Siroch Chatthong

1 November 2017	JL Chiangmai United (T4)	0–3	Bangkok United (T1)	Bangkok
19:00 (UTC+7)		Report	Pokklaw Anan 5'; Jaycee John 28'; Sumanya Purisai 63'	Stadium: Supachalasai Stadium; Attendance: 3,268; Referee: Wiwat Jampa-on

=== Final ===
The final will be featured by the winners of the semi-finals round, both were the clubs from T1. A match of this round was held on 25 November 2017.

25 November 2017	Chiangrai United (T1)	4–2	Bangkok United (T1)	Bangkok
19:00 (UTC+7)	Everton 25'; Rafael Coelho 58'; Vander Luiz 81', 90+3' (pen.)	Report; Highlight	Pokklaw Anan 6'; Jaycee John 74'	Stadium: Supachalasai Stadium; Attendance: 16,562; Referee: Songkran Boonmeekiat

== Top goalscorers ==
As of 25 November 2017 from official website.

Rank	Player	Club	Goals
1	(Brazil) Felipe Azevedo	Chiangrai United	6
2	(Bahrain) Jaycee John	Bangkok United	5
2	(Brazil) Heberty Fernandes	SCG Muangthong United	5
2	(Brazil) Barros Tardeli	Trat	5
5	(Montenegro) Dragan Bošković	Bangkok United	4
5	(Thailand) Teeratep Winothai	Bangkok United	4
5	(France) Michaël N'dri	BEC Tero Sasana	4
5	(Brazil) Vander Luiz	Chiangrai United	4
5	(Brazil) Josimar	Port	4
5	(Ghana) Gabriel Mintah	Samut Prakan	4
5	(Thailand) Suppasek Kaikaew	Thai Honda Ladkrabang	4

== See also ==
- 2017 Thai League
- 2017 Thai League 2
- 2017 Thai League 3
- 2017 Thai League 4
- 2017 Thailand Amateur League
- 2017 Thai League Cup
- 2017 Thailand Champions Cup
