= Nantasri =

Nantasri is a surname. Notable people with the surname include:

- Wicha Nantasri (born 1986), Thai footballer
- Wichan Nantasri (born 1986), Thai footballer
