= Attaphol Buspakom =

Thai footballer and coach (1962–2015)

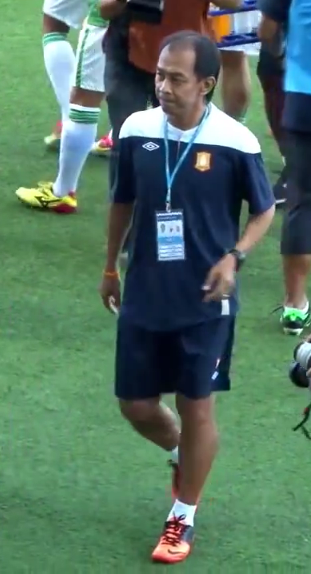
- Attaphol in 2013

Personal information
- Full name: Attaphol Buspakom
- Date of birth: 1 October 1962
- Place of birth: Chonburi, Thailand
- Date of death: 16 April 2015 (aged 52)
- Place of death: Bangkok, Thailand
- Height: 1.68 m (5 ft 6 in)
- Position: Midfielder

Senior career*
Years	Team	Apps	(Gls)
1985–1990	Thai Port	160	(34)
1989–1991	Pahang	57	(12)
1991–1994	Thai Port	114	(21)
1994–1996	Pahang	43	(10)
1996–1998	Stock Exchange of Thailand	49	(5)
Total		423	(82)

International career^{‡}
1985–1998	Thailand	85	(13)

Managerial career
- 2002–2004: BEC Tero Sasana
- 2006: Geylang United
- 2007–2008: Krung Thai Bank
- 2009: TTM Samut Sakhon
- 2009: Muangthong United
- 2010–2013: Buriram United
- 2013–2014: Bangkok Glass
- 2014–2015: Police United
- * Club domestic league appearances and goals ‡ National team caps and goals as of February 9, 2009

Attaphol Buspakom (Thai: อรรถพล ปุษปาคม; RTGS: Atthaphon Putsapakhom), nicknamed "Tak" (Thai: แต๊ก; RTGS: Taek); (1 October 1962 – 16 April 2015) was a Thai retired national footballer and football manager. He was given the role at Muangthong United and Buriram United after TTM Samut Sakhon folded after the 2009 season.

He played for the Thailand national football team, appearing in several FIFA World Cup qualifying matches.

== Club career ==
Attaphol began his career as a player at Thai Port FC in 1985. In his first year, he won his first championship with the club. He played for the club until 1989 and in 1987 also won the Queen's Cup. He then moved to Malaysia for two seasons for Pahang FA, then return to Thailand to his former club. His time from 1991 to 1994 was marked by less success than in his first stay at Port Authority. From 1994 to 1996 he played for Pahang again and this time he was able to win with the club, the Malaysia Super League and also reached the final of the Malaysia Cup and the Malaysia FA Cup. Both cup finals but lost. Back in Thailand, he let end his playing career at FC Stock Exchange of Thailand, with which he once again runner-up in 1996–97. In 1998, he finished his career.

== International career ==
For the Thailand national football team Attaphol played between 1985 and 1998 a total of 85 games and scored 13 results. In 1992, he participated with the team in the finals of the Asian Cup. He also stood in various cadres to qualifications to FIFA World Cup.

== Coaching career ==
=== Bec Tero Sasana ===
In BEC Tero Sasana F.C. began his coaching career in 2001 for him, first as assistant coach. He took over the reigning champions of the Thai League T1, after his predecessor Pichai Pituwong resigned from his post. It was his first coach station and he had the difficult task of leading the club through the new AFC Champions League. He could accomplish this task with flying colors and even led the club to the finals. The finale, then still played in home and away matches, was lost with 1:2 at the end against Al Ain FC. Attaphol is and was next to Charnwit Polcheewin the only coach who managed a club from Thailand to lead to the final of the AFC Champions League. 2002-03 and 2003-04 he won with the club also two runner-up. In his team, which reached the final of the Champions League, were a number of exceptional players like Therdsak Chaiman, Worrawoot Srimaka, Dusit Chalermsan and Anurak Srikerd.

=== Geylang United / Krung Thai Bank ===
In 2006, he went to Singapore in the S-League to Geylang United He was released after a few months due to lack of success. In 2008, he took over as coach at Krung Thai Bank F.C., where he had almost a similar task, as a few years earlier by BEC-Tero. As vice-champion of the club was also qualified for the AFC Champions League. However, he failed to lead the team through the group stage of the season 2008 and beyond. With the Kashima Antlers of Japan and Beijing Guoan F.C. athletic competition was too great. One of the highlights was put under his leadership, yet the club. In the group match against the Vietnam club Nam Dinh F.C. his team won with 9–1, but also lost four weeks later with 1–8 against Kashima Antlers. At the end of the National Football League season, he reached the Krung Thai 6th Table space. The Erstligalizenz the club was sold at the end of the season at the Bangkok Glass F.C. Attaphol finished his coaching career with the club and accepted an offer of TTM Samutsakorn. After only a short time in office

=== Muangthong United ===
In 2009, he received an offer from Muangthong United F.C., which he accepted and changed. He can champion Muang Thong United for 2009 Thai Premier League and Attaphol won Coach of The year for Thai Premier League and he was able to lead Muang Thong United to play AFC Champions League qualifying play-off for the first in the club's history.

=== Buriram United ===
In 2010 Buspakom moved from Muangthong United to Buriram United F.C. He received Coach of the Month in Thai Premier League 2 time in June and October.

In 2011, he led Buriram United win 2011 Thai Premier League second time for club and set a record with the most points in the Thai League T1 for 85 point and He led Buriram win 2011 Thai FA Cup by beat Muangthong United F.C. 1-0 and he led Buriram win 2011 Thai League Cup by beat Thai Port F.C. 2–0.

In 2012, he led Buriram United to the 2012 AFC Champions League group stage. Buriram along with Guangzhou Evergrande F.C. from China, Kashiwa Reysol from Japan and Jeonbuk Hyundai Motors which are all champions from their country. In the first match of Buriram they beat Kashiwa 3-2 and Second Match they beat Guangzhou 1–2 at the Tianhe Stadium. Before losing to Jeonbuk 0-2 and 3–2 with lose Kashiwa and Guangzhou 1-0 and 1-2 respectively and Thai Premier League Attaphol lead Buriram end 4th for table with win 2012 Thai FA Cup and 2012 Thai League Cup.

=== Bangkok Glass ===
In 2013, he moved from Buriram United to Bangkok Glass.

== Personal life ==
Attaphol's sons, Wannaphon Buspakom and Kanokpon Buspakom, are professional footballers.

== Death ==
On April 16, 2015, Attaphol died due to a blood infection.

== Honours ==
=== Player ===
Thai Port

- Kor Royal Cup: 1985, 1990

Pahang FA

- Malaysia Super League: 1995

Thailand

- Sea Games Gold Medal: 1993: Silver Medal; 1991

=== Manager ===
BEC Tero Sasana

- AFC Champions League runner-up: 2002-03
- ASEAN Club Championship runner-up: 2003

Muangthong United

- Thai Premier League: 2009

Buriram United

- Thai Premier League: 2011
- Thai FA Cup: 2011, 2012
- Thai League Cup: 2011, 2012
- Toyota Premier Cup: 2011
- Kor Royal Cup: 2013

Individual

- Thai Premier League Coach of the Year: 2001-02, 2009, 2013
