= Pharanyu Uppala =

Thai footballer

Personal information
- Full name: Pharanyu Uppala
- Date of birth: 9 June 1991 (age 35)
- Place of birth: Chiang Rai, Thailand
- Height: 1.80 m (5 ft 11 in)
- Position: Right-back

Team information
- Current team: Pattaya United
- Number: 4

Youth career
- Muangthong United

Senior career*
Years	Team	Apps	(Gls)
2016	Pattaya United	13	(0)
2017	Police Tero	10	(0)
2018	Udon Thani		
2019	Army United	11	(0)
2020	Lampang	13	(0)
2021	MOF Customs United	7	(0)
2021–2022	Chainat Hornbill	23	(1)
2022–	Pattaya United	58	(1)
- * Club domestic league appearances and goals as of 26 April 2025

Pharanyu Uppala (Thai: ภรัณยู อุปละ, born 9 June 1991) is a Thai professional footballer who plays as a right-back for Thai League 2 club Pattaya United. He played in the Thai Premier League in 2016 for Pattaya United and in 2017 for Police Tero.

== Honours ==
=== Club ===
Pattaya Dolphins United

- Thai League 3 Eastern Region: 2022–23
