= Takahiro Yanagi =

Japanese footballer

Takahiro Yanagi 柳 貴博
Personal information
- Full name: Takahiro Yanagi
- Date of birth: August 5, 1997 (age 29)
- Place of birth: Setagaya, Japan
- Height: 1.83 m (6 ft 0 in)
- Position: Right back

Team information
- Current team: BG Pathum United
- Number: 16

Youth career
- 2010–2015: FC Tokyo

Senior career*
Years	Team	Apps	(Gls)
2016–2018	FC Tokyo U-23	63	(1)
2016–2020	FC Tokyo	4	(0)
2019	→ Montedio Yamagata (loan)	30	(2)
2020	→ Vegalta Sendai (loan)	22	(1)
2021–2022	Consadole Sapporo	28	(0)
2022	→ Avispa Fukuoka (loan)	10	(0)
2023	FC Ryukyu	11	(2)
2024–2026	Fagiano Okayama	48	(2)
2026	Ikoma FC Nara	5	(1)
2026–	BG Pathum United	0	(0)
- * Club domestic league appearances and goals as of 14 March 2026

Takahiro Yanagi (柳 貴博, Yanagi Takahiro; born August 5, 1997) is a Japanese footballer who plays as right back for Thai League 1 club BG Pathum United.

== Career ==
Takahiro Yanagi joined FC Tokyo in 2016. On March 13, he debuted in J3 League (v SC Sagamihara).

In March 2023, Yanagi joined J3 League club FC Ryukyu.

In January 2024, Yanagi joined J2 League club Fagiano Okayama.

In February 2026, Yanagi joined Kansai Soccer League club Ikoma FC Nara.

In July 2026, Yanagi joined Thai League 1 club BG Pathum United F.C.

== Club statistics ==
As of 4 July 2023.

Appearances and goals by club, season and competition
Club	Season	League			Cup		League Cup		Other		Total	
Club	Season	Division	Apps	Goals	Apps	Goals	Apps	Goals	Apps	Goals	Apps	Goals
Japan			League		Emperor's Cup		J.League Cup		Other		Total	
FC Tokyo U-23	2016	J3 League	24	0	0	0	–		–		24	0
FC Tokyo U-23	2017	J3 League	19	0	0	0	–		–		19	0
FC Tokyo U-23	2018	J3 League	20	1	0	0	–		–		20	1
FC Tokyo U-23	Total		63	1	0	0	0	0	0	0	63	1
FC Tokyo	2017	J1 League	4	0	0	0	5	0	–		9	0
FC Tokyo	2018	J1 League	0	0	0	0	1	0	–		1	0
FC Tokyo	Total		4	0	0	0	6	0	0	0	10	0
Montedio Yamagata (loan)	2019	J2 League	30 (Note: Includes J1/J2 promotion play-offs)	2	0	0	–		–		30	2
Vegalta Sendai (loan)	2020	J1 League	22	1	0	0	0	0	0	0	22	1
Hokkaido Consadole Sapporo	2021	J1 League	25	0	2	0	9	1	–		36	1
Hokkaido Consadole Sapporo	2022	J1 League	3	0	0	0	2	0	–		5	0
Hokkaido Consadole Sapporo	Total		28	0	2	0	11	1	0	0	41	1
Avispa Fukuoka (loan)	2022	J1 League	10	0	3	0	2	0	–		15	0
FC Ryukyu	2023	J3 League	11	2	2	1	–		–		15	0
Career total			168	6	7	1	19	1	0	0	196	5
