= Suttipong Laoporn =

Thai footballer

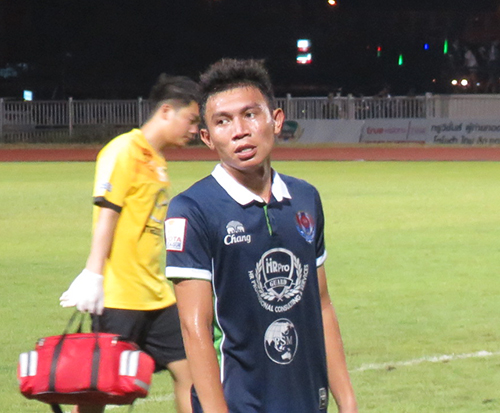

Personal information
- Full name: Suttipong Laoporn
- Date of birth: 16 February 1990 (age 36)
- Place of birth: Udon Thani, Thailand
- Height: 1.74 m (5 ft 8 1/2 in)
- Position: Forward

Senior career*
Years	Team	Apps	(Gls)
2012–2014	Marines Maptaphut	46	(19)
2014–2017	Navy	80	(10)
Total		126	(29)
- * Club domestic league appearances and goals as of 00:16, 21 November 2017 (UTC)

Suttipong Laoporn (Thai: สุทธิพงษ์ เหลาพร), simply known as K (Thai: เค), is a Thai former footballer who played as a forward.

== Match fixing scandal and ban ==
On February 21, 2017, Suttipong was accused of match-fixing on several league games. He was arrested by the Royal Thai Police and banned from football for life. He was later sentenced to a prison term of two years on March 18, 2021 by the Criminal Court.
