= Chanon Tamma =

Thai footballer (born 2004)

Chanon Thamma
Personal information
- Full name: Chanon Thamma
- Date of birth: 19 March 2004 (age 22)
- Place of birth: Bangkok, Thailand
- Height: 1.68 m (5 ft 6 in)
- Positions: Left-back; centre-back

Team information
- Current team: BG Pathum United
- Number: 2

Youth career
- 2017–2021: BG Pathum United

Senior career*
Years	Team	Apps	(Gls)
2021–	BG Pathum United	6	(0)
2021–2022	→ Uthai Thani (loan)	3	(0)
2023	→ Banbueng (loan)	15	(0)
2024–2025	→ Chanthaburi (loan)	34	(1)
2026	→ Ayutthaya United (loan)	9	(0)

International career
2018–2019	Thailand U16	9	(1)
2022	Thailand U19	10	(1)
2025–	Thailand U23	3	(0)
2025–	Thailand	1	(0)
- * Club domestic league appearances and goals as of 9 August 2026

Chanon Tamma (Thai: ชานนท์ ทำมา, born 19 March 2004) is a Thai professional footballer who plays as a Left back for Thai League 1 club BG Pathum United and the Thailand national team.

== Honours ==
=== Club ===
Uthai Thani

- Thai League 3: 2021–22
