= Witsanusak Kaewruang =

Thai footballer

- Witsanusak Kaewruang, Ayutthaya United FC, in the game against Navy FC, Thai League 2

Personal information
- Full name: Witsanusak Kaewruang
- Date of birth: 16 March 1984 (age 42)
- Place of birth: Nakhon Si Thammarat, Thailand
- Height: 1.80 m (5 ft 11 in)
- Position: Goalkeeper

Senior career*
Years	Team	Apps	(Gls)
2009–2010	Buriram PEA	3	(0)
2010–2011	Songkhla	34	(0)
2011–2016	Muangthong United	36	(0)
2011–2012	→ TOT (loan)	11	(0)
2012–2013	→ Suphanburi (loan)	3	(0)
2017	BEC Tero Sasana	1	(0)
2018	Udon Thani	8	(0)
2018	Navy	1	(0)
2019	Simork	2	(0)
2019	Bangkok	5	(0)
2020	Ayutthaya United	10	(0)
Total		114	(0)
- * Club domestic league appearances and goals as of 23 May 2010 ‡ National team caps and goals as of 6 January 2011

Witsanusak Kaewruang (Thai: วิศณุศักดิ์ แก้วเรือง, born March 16, 1984), is a Thai retired professional footballer who plays as a goalkeeper.

== International career ==
In 2014, he was called up to the national team by Kiatisuk Senamuang to play in the 2015 AFC Asian Cup qualification.

== Honours ==
=== Club ===
Muangthong United

- Thai League 1 (1): 2016
- Thai League Cup (1): 2016
