= Wannaphon Buspakom =

Thai footballer (born 1989)

Personal information
- Full name: Wannaphon Buspakom
- Date of birth: 2 January 1989 (age 37)
- Place of birth: Bangkok, Thailand
- Height: 1.72 m (5 ft 7 1/2 in)
- Position: Defensive midfielder

Team information
- Current team: Rajpracha
- Number: 4

Youth career
- 2006–2007: Bangkok Glass

Senior career*
Years	Team	Apps	(Gls)
2008–2010	Bangkok Glass	9	(0)
2011–2013	Osotspa Saraburi	16	(2)
2014	Singhtarua	3	(0)
2015–2016	Police United	6	(0)
2017–2019	Army United	28	(4)
2020–2021	Police Tero	4	(0)
2021–	Rajpracha	3	(0)
- * Club domestic league appearances and goals as of 13 October 2021

Wannaphon Buspakom (Thai: วรรณพล บุษปาคม; born 2 January 1989) is a Thai professional footballer who plays as a defensive midfielder for Rajpracha.

== Personal life ==
Wannaphon is the son of former footballer and coach Attaphol Buspakom and older brother of footballer Kanokpon Buspakom.

== Club career ==
He played for Krung Thai Bank in the 2008 AFC Champions League group stages.
