= Pasqual Verkamp =

German footballer (born 1997)

Personal information
- Date of birth: 13 October 1997 (age 29)
- Place of birth: Stuttgart, Germany
- Height: 1.80 m (5 ft 11 in)
- Position: Winger

Team information
- Current team: BG Pathum United
- Number: 21

Youth career
- Bayern Alzenau
- 2015–2016: Darmstadt 98

Senior career*
Years	Team	Apps	(Gls)
2016–2017	Rot-Weiß Darmstadt	27	(3)
2017–2018	Alemannia Haibach	24	(9)
2018–2020	Viktoria Aschaffenburg	46	(13)
2020–2021	Carl Zeiss Jena	11	(5)
2021–2022	Viktoria Berlin	14	(0)
2022–2024	Carl Zeiss Jena	61	(13)
2024–2026	Lokomotive Leipzig	54	(5)
2026–	BG Pathum United	3	(1)
- * Club domestic league appearances and goals as of 02:14, 20 November 2026 (UTC)

Pasqual Verkamp (Thai: พัสคัล แฟร์คัมพ์; born 13 October 1997) is a German professional footballer who plays as a winger for Thai League 1 club BG Pathum United.

== Career ==
Verkamp is a former youth academy player of Bayern Alzenau and Darmstadt 98. He started his senior career with Rot-Weiß Darmstadt in German fifth division Hessenliga during 2016–17 season.

On 22 August 2020, Verkamp scored two goals for Carl Zeiss Jena in their 8–2 Thuringian Cup final win against Martinroda. On 30 June 2021, newly promoted 3. Liga club Viktoria Berlin announced the signing of Verkamp on a two-year deal.

On 15 June 2022, Verkamp returned to Carl Zeiss Jena by signing a two-year contract. In May 2024, he joined 1. FC Lokomotive Leipzig on a two-year contract.

== Personal life ==
Verkamp was born in Germany to a Thai father and a German mother.

== Honours ==
Carl Zeiss Jena

- Thuringian Cup: 2019–20
