= Kanokpon Buspakom =

Thai footballer (born 1999)

Personal information
- Full name: Kanokpon Buspakom
- Date of birth: 20 September 1999 (age 27)
- Place of birth: Bangkok, Thailand
- Height: 1.75 m (5 ft 9 in)
- Position: Midfielder

Team information
- Current team: Chanthaburi (on loan from BG Pathum United)
- Number: 24

Youth career
- 2012–2017: Bangkok Christian College

Senior career*
Years	Team	Apps	(Gls)
2018–2022	Police Tero	32	(1)
2022–	BG Pathum United	3	(0)
2023	→ Nakhon Ratchasima (loan)	8	(0)
2023–2024	→ Nakhon Pathom United (loan)	2	(0)
2024	→ Rayong (loan)	4	(0)
2025–2026	→ Chanthaburi (loan)	26	(1)

International career
2018	Thailand U19	3	(0)
- * Club domestic league appearances and goals

Kanokpon Buspakom (Thai: กนกพล ปุษปาคม, born 20 September 1999) is a Thai professional footballer who plays as a midfielder for Thai League 2 club Chanthaburi.

== International career ==
Kanokpon was part of Thailand U19's squad that competed in the 2018 Hassanal Bolkiah Trophy.

== Honours ==
=== Club ===
BG Pathum United

- Thailand Champions Cup: 2022
- Thai League Cup: 2023–24

== Personal life ==
Kanokpon is the son of former footballer and coach Attaphol Buspakom and younger brother of footballer Wannaphon Buspakom.
