= Phuwanart Khamkaew =

Thai footballer

Personal information
- Full name: Phuwanart Khamkaew
- Date of birth: 17 January 1998 (age 28)
- Place of birth: Nakhon Si Thammarat, Thailand
- Height: 1.88 m (6 ft 2 in)
- Position: Striker

Team information
- Current team: Saraburi United
- Number: 7

Youth career
- 2009–2014: Assumption College Thonburi
- 2014–2017: Leicester City

Senior career*
Years	Team	Apps	(Gls)
2017–2020	Police Tero	8	(2)
2019	→ Nakhon Si United (loan)	5	(0)
2020	→ Suphanburi (loan)	0	(0)
2020	Ranong United	2	(0)
2021	Samut Sakhon United	0	(0)
2021	See Khwae City	10	(1)
2022	Kabin United	7	(2)
2023	Udon Thani	14	(1)
2023	Phatthalung	1	(0)
2023–	Saraburi United	4	(0)
- * Club domestic league appearances and goals as of 21 January 2024

Phuwanart Khamkaew (Thai: ภูวนาถ คำแก้ว; born January 17, 1998), is a Thai professional footballer who plays as a striker.

== Club career ==
In youth career Phuwanart Khamkaew was trained for 2 years and a half at Leicester City in England.
