= Wicha Nantasri =

Thai footballer (born 1986)

Personal information
- Full name: Wicha Nantasri
- Date of birth: 15 January 1986 (age 40)
- Place of birth: Khon Kaen, Thailand
- Height: 1.71 m (5 ft 7 1/2 in)
- Position: Midfielder

Senior career*
Years	Team	Apps	(Gls)
2009–2010	Loei City	41	(2)
2011–2012	Sisaket	19	(0)
2013–2014	PTT Rayong	24	(0)
2015–2016	Navy	19	(0)
2017	Chiangmai	15	(0)
2018	Khon Kaen	6	(1)
2018–2019	Samut Sakhon	15	(0)
Total		139	(3)
- * Club domestic league appearances and goals

Wicha Nantasri (Thai: วิชา นันทะศรี, born January 15, 1986), or simply known as Bob (Thai: บ๊อบ), is a Thai retired professional footballer who plays as a midfielder.

== Personal life ==
Wicha's twin older brother Wichan is also a footballer.

== Honours ==
=== Club ===
Loei City

- Regional League North-East Division (2): 2009, 2010
