= Wichan Nantasri =

Thai footballer (born 1986)

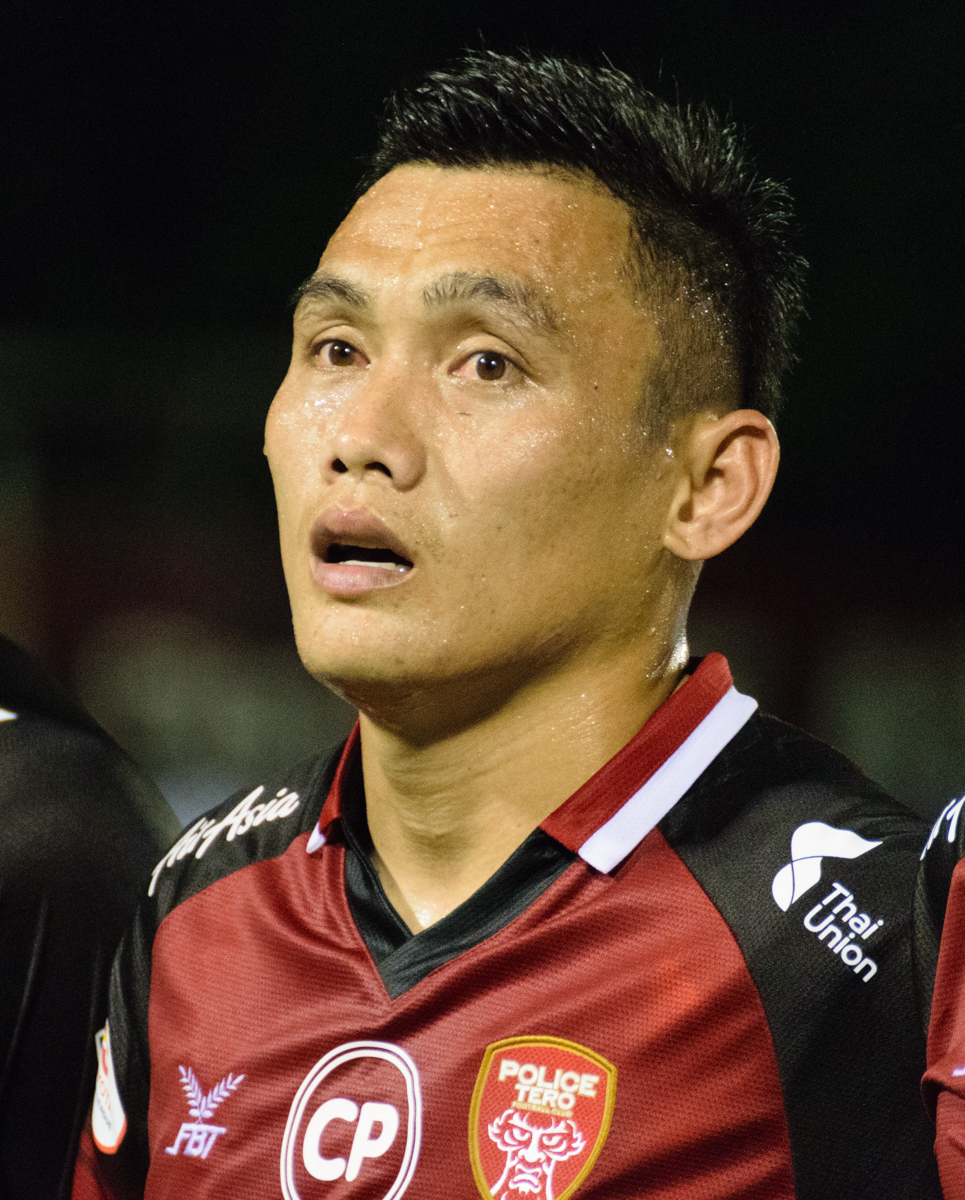

Personal information
- Full name: Wichan Nantasri
- Date of birth: 15 January 1986 (age 40)
- Place of birth: Khon Kaen, Thailand
- Height: 1.70 m (5 ft 7 in)
- Position: Winger

Senior career*
Years	Team	Apps	(Gls)
2009	Loei City	23	(5)
2010–2015	TOT	122	(9)
2015–2019	Police Tero	43	(12)
2016	→ Pattaya United (loan)	9	(0)
2019	Chainat Hornbill	3	(0)
2020–2021	Uthai Thani	10	(0)
2021–2022	Muang Loei United	31	(5)
Total		241	(31)
- * Club domestic league appearances and goals as of 20 March 2022 (UTC)

Wichan Nantasri (Thai: วิชาญ นันทะศรี, born January 15, 1986), or simply known as Brid (Thai: เบิร์ด), is a Thai retired professional footballer who plays as a winger.

== Personal life ==
Wichan's twin younger brother Wicha is also a footballer.

== Honours ==
=== Club ===
Loei City

- Regional League North-East Division (1): 2009

Muang Loei United

- Thai League 3 Northeastern Region (1): 2021–22
