= List of people from Cebu =

The following is a list of notable people who were either born in, lived in, are current residents of, or are closely associated with the province of Cebu, Philippines (including from highly urbanized cities of Cebu, Mandaue and Lapu-Lapu):

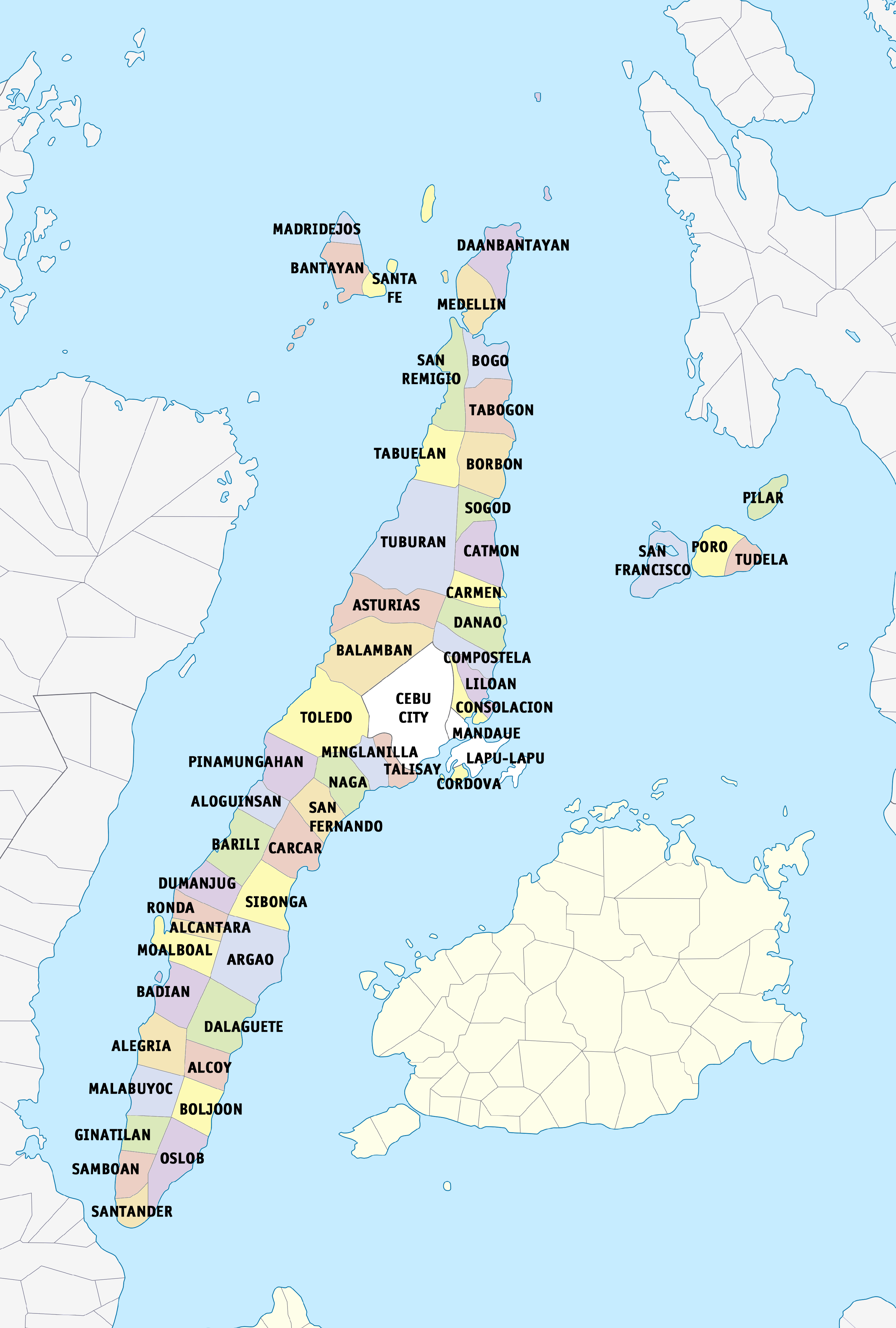
The administrative division of Cebu.

The location of Cebu in the Philippines.

== Pre-colonial monarch and rulers of Cebu ==
=== Rajahnate of Cebu ===
==== Rajah of the Rajahnate of Cebu ====
- Sri Lumay - The first Rajah and founder of the Indianized kingdom and historic polity of Cebu. He was of half-Tamil and half-Malay descent from Sumatra.
- Rajah Humabon - Rajah of Cebu during the 16th century (until 1521). He was baptized as Don Carlos Valderrama and was one of the recorded chiefs of the historic polity of Cebu who encountered Ferdinand Magellan in 1521.
- Rajah Tupas - Rajah of Cebu from 1521 to 1565. He was the last Rajah of Cebu in the pre-Hispanic Indianized polity of the Philippines.

==== Hara of the Rajahnate of Cebu ====
- Hara Humamay - the queen consort of Cebu and the wife of Rajah Humabon. She was baptized as Queen Juana.

==== Sri of the Rajahnate of Cebu ====
- Sri Alho - Son of Sri Lumay, he ruled the southern part of Cebu called Sialo which included the present-day towns of Carcar and Santander in the southern region of Cebu.
- Sri Ukob - Son of Sri Lumay, he ruled the northern Cebu called Nahalin which includes the present towns of Consolacion, Liloan, Compostela, Danao, Carmen, and Bantayan.
- Sri Parang the Limp - Son of Sri Lumay and father of Rajah Tupas, Sri Parang was supposed to rule but was infirm, so he handed the throne to his nephew, Rajah Humabon who became the rajah of Cebu in his stead.
- Sri Bantog - The youngest son of Sri Lumay, he ruled the region of Singhapala which is now Mabolo of Cebu City and was the father of Rajah Humabon.

=== Datu of Cebu ===
- Lapulapu - Datu of Mactan. He is known for leading the resistance in the 1521 Battle of Mactan, where he and his warriors defeated the Spanish forces led by Portuguese explorer Ferdinand Magellan, along with his native allies Rajah Humabon and Datu Zula. He is considered the first national hero of the Philippines.
- Datu Daya - A legendary lord of Kandaya, now known as Daanbantayan. He was the ruler of the earliest settlers in northern Cebu.
- Lázaro Mangubat - A monarch of the Kingdom of Mactan, a Spanish duke in the Spanish East Indies, a member of the Tercio and a conquistador, as well as one of the arm bearers (armiger) in the Spanish Empire during the early 17th century.

== Literature ==
- Antonio Abad - a poet, fictionist, playwright and essayist. (Barili)
- Gémino Abad - an educator, writer, and literary critic. He is a National Artist of the Philippines for Literature. (Barili)
- Martin Abellana – an author. (Cebu City)
- Onofre Abellanosa - writer of short stories and plays. (Cebu City)
- Victorino A. Abellanosa - a dramatist who is specialized in writing plays particularly zarzuelas. (Cebu City)
- Ramón D. Abellanosa - political journalist, minor politician, businessman, and writer. He was best known for his plays. (Cebu City)
- Temistokles Adlawan - a contemporary poet and short story writer who often writes with irreverent humor usually associated with Cebuano folk. (Cebu City)
- Ruperto Alaura - a writer. He was a LUDABI prize winner in 1961. (Cebu City)
- Sinforosa Alcordo - a fiction writer during the pre-war era. (Cebu City)
- Jacinto Alcos - a pre-second world war writer. (Cebu City)
- Epifanio Alfafara - writer in the Cebuano language of political and philosophical articles. He used Isco Anino as a pen name. (Carcar City)
- Sergio Alfafara - a writer. He published, authored and translated religious and missal texts in Cebuano. He published a grammar of Cebuano known as Sugboanon nga Gramatika. His pennames included Napoleon Alferez. (Carcar City)
- Estrella Alfon - an author who wrote in English language.(Cebu City)
- Potenciano Aliño - a writer, translator, and revolutionary. (Talisay City)
- Cora Almerino - a writer. Her poems were included in Sinug-ang: A Cebuano trio published by Women in Literary Arts in 1999. (Cebu City)
- Tomas N. Alonso - is a well-known Cebuano writer. He published the first complete Cebuano translation of Jose Rizal's El Filibusterismo. He also translated the Mi Último Adiós. (Cebu City)
- Uldarico A. Alviola - known as the "Dean of Cebuano Writers", he was a civil servant, novelist, and editor. (Cebu City)
- Natalio Bacalso - a writer, newspaperman, radio broadcaster, and filmmaker. (Cebu City)
- Peter Bacho - a writer and teacher best known for his book Cebu which won the American Book Award. His book is defined as Filipino American literature because of its explorations in themes such as neocolonialism and Filipino-American identity. (Cebu City)
- Cecilia Manguerra Brainard - an author and editor. She co-founded PAWWA or Philippine American Women Writers and Artists; and also founded Philippine American Literary House. (Cebu City)
- José María del Mar - a writer, orator, playwright, theater actor, politician and authority on the Spanish Language. (Cebu City)
- Simeon Dumdum Jr. - a writer, poet and former RTC judge. (Balamban)
- Adonis Durado - a poet, visual journalist, and graphic designer. (Cebu City)
- Lina Espina-Moore - a writer. (Toledo City)
- Vicente Garces - a writer, poet and politician. (Talisay City)
- Vicente Gullas - a writer, lawyer, and educator. (Cebu City)
- Pio Kabahar - a composer, playwright, journalist, and director. (Cebu City)
- Ernesto Lariosa - a writer, poet, and columnist. (San Fernando)
- Trizer D. Mansueto - an author of several books, he is also involved in museums, translation and teaching. He contributes stories to Cebu Daily News and the Philippine Daily Inquirer. (Bantayan)
- Resil B. Mojares - a historian and critic of Philippine literature best known as for his books on Philippine history. He was recognized in 2018 as a National Artist of the Philippines for Literature. (Cebu City)
- Hilda Montaire - a writer. (Mandaue City)
- Marcelino Navarra - an editor, poet, and writer. He was regarded as the father of modern Cebuano short story. (Carcar City)
- Gilda Olvidado - a movie and television writer, and melodrama novelist. (Cebu City)
- Amando Osório - a poet, playwright, novelist, and Cebu deputy governor. (Dalaguete)
- Sulpicio Osório - an editor, poet, and writer of fiction and essay in Cebuano language. (Dalaguete)
- Gardeopatra Quijano - feminist fiction writer and was awarded the Gawad CCP para sa Sining: Panitikang Rehiyunal from the Cultural Center of the Philippines in 1993. (Alcantara)
- Nicolas Rafols - a legislator, journalist, businessman, lawyer, and agriculturalist. (Toledo City)
- Napoleon Rama - a lawyer, journalist, and writer in English and Spanish. In 2011, he was awarded the Philippine Legion of Honor, the country's highest recognition, with the rank of Grand Commander on the 25th anniversary of the EDSA 1 Revolution by President Benigno S. Aquino III. (Cebu City)
- Vicente Rama - a legislator, publisher, and writer. (Cebu City)
- Vicente Ranudo - a writer, poet laureate, and Cebu provincial civil servant. (Cebu City)
- Buenaventura Rodriguez - was one of the popular playwrights in Cebuano language during the American occupation. Like his contemporaries, his works featured the theme of rising nationalism, combining social criticism and entertainment. (Bogo City)
- Hope Sabanpan-Yu - a short story writer and poet. (Cebu City)
- Adelino Sitoy - was a lawyer, and Cebuano language advocate from Cebu, Philippines.(Cebu City)
- Vicente Sotto – an author and politician. (Cebu City)
- Florentino Suico - a public school teacher and prolific writer, fictionist, poet, and journalist. He was known for his historical fiction written in Cebuano language. (Mandaue City)
- Florentino Tecson - a writer, editor, labor leader, lawyer and politician. (Naga City)

== Visual arts and design ==
=== Painting ===
- Martino Abellana "Noy Tinong" - a renowned painter dubbed as "The Dean of Cebuano Painters". His works includes portraits, landscapes, and still lifes in oil, pastels, and charcoal. (Carcar City)
- Paulina Constancia - a multifaceted naive artist known for her work on canvas, textiles, and found materials, sometimes incorporating stitching. (Cebu City)
- Raymundo Francia - a painter known as "Cebu’s Michelangelo," famous for his ecclesiastical murals and church ceiling paintings across Visayas. (Cebu City)
- Romulo Galicano - a painter whose works are technically academic and philosophical in approach. His works are hauntingly reminiscent of the old Filipino Masters with modern sensibilities. (Carcar City)
- Sofronio Mendoza - a cubist, realist and impressionist painter and mentor active in the Philippines and in Canada. Co-founder of Dimasalang Art Group. (Cebu City)

=== Sculpture ===
- Ramon Abellana - a sculptor who created the Carcar City Rotunda, the Sergio Osmeña Sr and Lapu-Lapu at the Cebu Provincial Capitol, Humabon in Plaza Hamabar, and another statue of Don Sergio Osmeña Sr. (Carcar City)
- Napoleon Abueva - a sculptor, he was known as the "Father of Modern Philippine Sculpture". He was proclaimed as National Artist of the Philippines for sculpture in 1976. (his mother was from Tuburan)
- David Medalla - an artist. His work ranged from sculpture and kinetic art to painting, installation, and performance art. (Cebu City)

=== Printmaking ===
- Manuel Rodriguez Sr. "Mang Maning" - a printmaker. He was one of the pioneers of printmaking in the Philippines, recognized as the "Father of Philippine Printmaking". (Cebu City)

=== Graphic design ===
- Adonis Durado - a graphic designer and visual journalist. His poetry collection "Who Steps Upon is Stepped Upon" was awarded the 2023 Philippine National Book Awards. (Cebu City)
- Leinil Francis Yu - a comic book artist best known for his work for Marvel. (Lapu-lapu City)

=== Fashion design ===
- Leo Almodal - a haute couture fashion designer famous for intricate, opulent bridal gowns and evening wear often worn by pageant queens and celebrities. (Mandaue City)
- Harvey Cenit - UAE-based international fashion designer. Winner of Fashion Factor Season 3 and 2016 Most Promising Fashion Designer of the Year award at The Filipino Times Awards. (Medellin)
- Monique Lhuillier - an international fashion designer and creative director renowned for luxury bridal wear, ready-to-wear, lifestyle brand and celebrity wedding and red carpet gowns for international stars. (Cebu City)
- Furne One - a Dubai-based fashion designer and the creative director and founder of Amato Couture. He is celebrated for his avant‑garde designs and dressed a wide array of global celebrities. (Cebu City)
- Cary Santiago - a fashion designer and couturier known for his elaborate evening wear, sculptural couture pieces, and contributions to Philippine high fashion.(Cebu City)
- Philipp Tampus is a fashion designer known for his bridal, evening wear, and haute couture designs. He participated in Project Runway Philippines and Philippine Fashion Week. (Lapu-lapu City)

=== Costume design ===
- Clint Ramos - a costume and set designer for stage and screen. He became the first person of color to win the Tony Award for Best Costume Design in a Play for (Eclipsed 2016). (Cebu City)

=== Industrial design ===
- Kenneth Cobonpue - an industrial designer known for his unique designs integrating natural materials through innovative handmade production processes. His clients includes Hollywood celebrities and members of royalty. TIME Magazine has called him "rattan’s first great virtuoso". (Mandaue City)
- Vito Selma - a furniture and industrial designer known for his contemporary furniture designs that emphasize natural materials, particularly wood. (Cebu City)

== Mass media and journalism ==
- Angela Calina - local news anchor and TV host in Cebu. Former housemate in the reality show Pinoy Big Brother: Celebrity Edition. (Cebu City)
- Dan Campilan - a radio and TV reporter for GMA Network. (Cebu City)
- Ahmed Cuizon - is a media practitioner. He was the anchor of Sugbuanon Na Ni over Radio Station DYAB and a contributing writer in Cebu's newspaper. He started his broadcast career in DYAB AM as a news and public affairs host. He is a member of KBP Kapisanan ng mga Brodkaster ng Pilipinas. (Cebu City)
- Bambi Francisco - a journalist, author, and businesswoman. She is the founder and CEO of Vator, a news website and social network dedicated to high-tech entrepreneurs and investors. (Cebu City)
- Harry Gasser - Newscaster and anchor of Balita Ngayon on ABS-CBN from 1969 to 1972. (Carcar City)
- Bong Lapira - a pioneering broadcast journalist, news anchor, and radio personality. He is a veteran commentator of news programs such as Newsbreak on ABS-CBN from 1967 to 1969. (Carcar City)
- Leo Lastimosa - is a veteran tri-media journalist based in Cebu City. He was formerly an anchorman for ABS-CBN's regional news program, TV Patrol Central Visayas, the host of the current affairs program Arangkada on radio station DYAB, and a columnist for Cebu's newspaper, The Freeman. (Cebu City)
- Maria Quiban - weather anchor for KTTV in Los Angeles, California. (Cebu City)
- Amelyn Veloso - broadcast journalist CNN Philippines. (Cebu City)

== Performing arts and entertainment ==
=== Music, film and television personalities ===
==== Global personalities ====
- Mark Adam - Malaysia-based singer, songwriter, actor, comedian and radio host who built a successful entertainment career in Malaysia. (Cebu City)
- Kim Adis - British-Filipino actress. She is best known for her role as Kitty Wei in the BBC iPlayer series Get Even. (Cebu City)
- Joan Almedilla - USA-based film and theater actress, composer, and singer who has starred as Kim in the Broadway musical Miss Saigon. (Cebu City)
- Yazmin Aziz - a Malaysian-Filipino singer, songwriter, actress and content creator in Malaysia. (her father is from Cebu)
- Joanna Bacalso - Filipino-Canadian television and movie actress and director in Hollywood. She was also a model. (Cebu City)
- Tia Carrere - American actress and singer who won two Grammy Awards for Best Hawaiian Music Album. (her father is from Cebu).
- Cheesa - Filipino-American pop/R&B singer and songwriter most noted for her run on NBC's The Voice in 2012. (her mother is from Barili)
- Kriesha Chu - Filipino-American singer and actress based in South Korea. She debuted as a solo K-pop artist under Urban Works Media entertainment with her single "Trouble" in 2017. (her parents are from Cebu)
- Darren Criss - American actor, singer, and songwriter. He made history at the 78th Annual Tony Awards on 2025, by becoming the first Asian American actor to win Best Performance by a Leading Actor in a Musical. (his mother is from Cebu)
- Charlie Green - English–Filipino singer, best known for appearing on the second series of Britain's Got Talent. After the show, he signed a record deal with Star Records. (his mother is from Dumanjug)
- Kirk Hammett - American musician who has been the lead guitarist of the heavy metal band Metallica. (his mother is from Cebu).
- Robert Hill - an American harpsichordist and fortepianist. He is also music professor in Germany and USA. (Cebu City)
- JJ - Austrian singer. He won the Eurovision Song Contest 2025 for Austria with the song "Wasted Love". (his mother is from Cebu)
- Ron Josol - a Filipino-Canadian actor and stand-up comedian. He has been featured on the show Video on Trial, which he has also written for. (his family is from Cebu)
- Elena Jurado - Filipino-American actress working primarily in silent films during the 1920s, known as "The Island Cinderella". She is credited with being the first Southeast Asian actress to appear in Hollywood films. (Sibonga)
- Bruno Mars - American singer, songwriter, musician, and record producer. He is regarded as a pop icon, he is known for his three-octave tenor vocal range, live performances, retro showmanship, and musical versatility.(his mother is from Cebu)
- John Pearce - Australian-filipino singer, dancer and children's entertainer best known as a member of Justice Crew, and also a member of the children's band The Wiggles. (his mother is from Cebu)
- Malia Pyles - American actress. She is best known for her portrayals of Sarah Baskets on the FX series Baskets and Minnie "Mouse" Honrada on the Max slasher horror series Pretty Little Liars. (her mother is from Cebu)
- Olivia Rodrigo - American singer-songwriter and actress. She rose to prominence for her leading roles in the Disney Channel series Bizaardvark and the Disney+ series High School Musical: The Musical: The Series. (her great-grandfather is from San Fernando).
- Amy Vachal - American singer-songwriter. She is best known as a semi-finalist on the 9th season of The Voice . She had previously released two EPs prior to appearing on The Voice. (her mother is from Dumanjug)
- Shawn Wasabi - American singer and record producer. He is credited as a co-inventor of the Midi Fighter 64, a custom musical software controller. (his mother is from Cebu)
- Wendy Woo - a singer and songwriter in Colorado. She won the Westword Music Awards five times. (her father is from Cebu City)

==== National personalities ====
- Alexei Abella - actress, singer, dancer and content creator. She is former member of YGIG an all Filipino girl group under JYP Entertainment and SBTown. (Cebu City)
- Ramon Abellana - a composer. (Carcar City)
- Ellen Adarna – actress, model, and former internet celebrity. (Cebu City)
- R.D. Alba - a film and television director (Cebu City)
- Marco Alcaraz - actor, commercial model, and former varsity basketball player at San Sebastian College-Recoletos. (Cebu City)
- Gabby Alipe - singer-songwriter and musician known as the frontman and rhythm guitarist of the rock band Urbandub. He was also a co-founder and guitarist of the band Franco. (Cebu City)
- Francisco C. Álvarez - was a stage actor and playwright. (Cebu City)
- Morissette Amon - singer, songwriter, and record producer. She has been referred to as "Asia's Phoenix". (Minglanilla)
- Juanita Antido - was a vaudeville performer who was internationally known with performance tours during the early 1920s. She was dubbed as "Queen of Jazz in the Orient". (Cebu City)
- Ferdinand Aragon - is a singer, songwriter, and visual artist. He won first prize at the National Artist Jose T. Joya Awards multiple times for his art pieces. (Cebu City)
- Aiah Arceta - singer, rapper, dancer, model and member of P-pop girl group Bini. (Lapu-Lapu City)
- Daisy Ba-ad - a playwright, stage director, composer, motivational speaker and life coach. (Cebu City)
- Natalio Bacalso - a filmmaker, writer, newspaperman, radio broadcaster. (Cebu City)
- Jovit Baldivino - a singer and actor. He was the first winner of Pilipinas Got Talent in 2010. (his father is from Dalaguete)
- Marjorie Barretto - an actress. (Cebu City)
- Janet Basco – singer. (Cebu City)
- Terence Baylon - actor and model (Cebu City)
- Sheena Belarmino - singer, dancer, and actress. She rose to prominence after becoming a grand finalist on Tawag ng Tanghalan Kids in 2017. In 2015, she joined Dance Kids and made it into the quarter-finals. (Cebu City)
- Bryan Benedict - actor and model. (Cebu City)
- Fretzie Bercede - actress and TV personality. 3rd big placer of Pinoy Big Brother: Teen Clash 2010. (Cebu City)
- Janine Berdin - singer and songwriter. Grand champion of the second season of Tawag ng Tanghalan on It's Showtime. (Lapu-Lapu City)
- Jackie Lou Blanco - actress (Cebu City)
- Novo Bono Jr. - singer and actor. Tawag ng Tanghalan 1970 grand champion. (Cebu City)
- Dave Bornea - actor, model and dancer. One of top 18 survivors on 6th season GMA's hit reality show StarStruck. (Talisay City)
- Luis Borromeo - a jazz musician and entertainer. Known as the "King of Jazz" in the Philippines. (Cebu City)
- Eula Caballero – actress, first Star Factor grand winner. (Boljoon)
- Manuel Kabajar Cabase - a singer, songwriter, musical director, computer musician, instrumentalist of at least 28 musical instruments, arranger, conductor, bandleader and musical director. (Cebu City)
- Maria Amapola Cabase – singer, musician, actress, TV host and novelist. (Sibonga)
- Hazel Cabrera - film actress particularly in bold and adult-themed roles and former member of Viva Hot Babes. (Cebu City)
- Golden Cañedo - singer, first grand winner of reality singing competition The Clash (TV program). (Minglanilla)
- Paul Jake Castillo - actor and businessman. Runner-up of ABS-CBN's Pinoy Big Brother: Double Up. (Cebu City)
- Cattski - singer-songwriter, musician, record producer and founder of independent record label 22 Tango Records and Music Publishing. (Cebu City)
- Kiray Celis - comedian and actress. (Cebu City)
- Priscilla Cellona - a film actress. She was one of the contract stars of LVN Pictures. (Cebu City)
- Kim Chiu – actress and singer. Grand winner of the first teen edition of Pinoy Big Brother.(Cebu City)
- José Clímaco - a film director. (Cebu City)
- Pilita Corrales - pop singer, songwriter, actress, comedian and television presenter. Popularly referred to as the "Asia's Queen of Songs". (Cebu City)
- Monica Cuenco - singer and actress. The second runner-up of Star Power (TV program). (Cebu City)
- Julian Daan - a character he played in a radio drama, was a Filipino Cebuano film, local TV, stage, and radio writer, director, actor, comedian, and politician. (Talisay City)
- Matt Daclan - an actor. (Cebu City)
- Patani Daño - actress and comedian. She contestant from Survivor Philippines season 1. (San Francisco)
- Elyson de Dios - actor and athlete. Runner-up in StarStruck season 6 in 2015. (Cebu City)
- Niña Dolino - an actress. (her father is from Toledo City)
- Dulce - singer and actress. She is popularly referred to as "Asia's Timeless Diva". (Cebu City)
- Tita Duran - film actress, the first successful child star of Philippine cinema. (Pinamungajan)
- DJ Durano - an actor, television personality, singer and recording artist. (Sogod)
- Jason Dy - singer, songwriter, musician and occasional actor. Winner of the 2nd of The Voice of the Philippines. (Cebu City)
- Kyle Echarri - actor, endorser, singer, songwriter, performer and vlogger. He joined The Voice Kids (Philippine TV series) season 2. (Cebu City)
- Carren Eistrup - singer, performer and television host. Bida Next winner of Eat Bulaga. (Cebu City)
- Shuvee Etrata - model, actress, host, and content creator. (Bantayan)
- Anna Fegi – singer and actress (Toledo City)
- Flora Gasser - was a veteran film and television actress. She is best known as "The Yaya of Philippine Television". (Carcar City)
- Clifford Gaw - an actor and model. Former housemate of Pinoy Big Brother: Celebrity Collab Edition 2.0. (Cebu City)
- Enrique Gil – an actor, dancer, model and endorser. (Cebu City)
- Shanaia Gomez - an actress, singer, model and host. (Talisay City)
- Beauty Gonzalez - an actress and model. (Daanbantayan)
- Erich Gonzales - an actress, model and endorser. (Cebu City)
- Francis Greg - a singer-songwriter based in Cebu. He is a former contestant on ABS-CBN's It's Showtime's Tawag ng Tanghalan. He is one of the members of the band from Danao City's Stereotype. (Danao City)
- Matteo Guidicelli – actor, military officer, model, singer and former kart racer. (Cebu City)
- Ramon Christopher Gutierrez - Filipino actor, he is a member of the famous Gutierrez clan of actors in the Philippines. (his mother is from Cebu City)
- Raymond Gutierrez - a host, editor, columnist, endorser, entrepreneur, and occasional actor. (his mother is from Cebu City)
- Richard Gutierrez - an actor. He is regarded as the original "Fantaserye King". (his mother is from Cebu City)
- Ruffa Gutierrez - an actress, model and beauty queen, was Miss World 1993 2nd Runner Up. (her mother is from Cebu City)
- Dom Guyot - singer and songwriter. (Cebu City)
- Honcho - (formerly Bosx1ne) rapper, singer and songwriter. He founded the Filipino hip-hop group Ex Battalion in 2012. (Consolacion)
- Nita Javier - a film actress and a classical singer. She appeared in romantic and dramatic films opposite well-known male leads of the era. (Cebu City)
- Jolianne - a singer and songwriter. (Cebu City)
- Elena Jurado - an Asian-American actress working primarily in silent films during the 1920s. She is credited with being the first Southeast Asian actress to appear in Hollywood films. (Sibonga)
- Pio Kabahar - a playwright, writer, journalist, director and composer. (Cebu City)
- Karencitta- a singer and songwriter. (Cebu City)
- June Keithley - an actress and broadcast journalist. (Cebu City)
- Juan Karlos Labajo - singer, musician, and actor. He finished 3rd in the 1st season of The Voice Kids (Philippine TV series) season 1 in 2014. (Consolacion)
- Chadleen Lacdo-o - an actress and singer. She was the grand champion of the singing competition in TV5 Kanta Pilipinas. (Cebu City)
- Maureen Larrazabal - actress, singer and commercial model. (Cebu City)
- Benjo Leoncio - former actor and TV Personality in TV5. 4th male finalist in Artista Academy. (Cebu City)
- Mikha Lim - pop singer, girl band group member of BINI. (Cebu City)
- Minggoy Lopez - is an actor, singer, songwriter and musician. Known as "Cebu's Music Man". (Cebu City)
- Jin Macapagal - Actor, Grand Winner of BidaMan: The Big Break contest of It's Showtime. (Cebu City)
- Shaina Magdayao - an actress, model and endorser. (Bogo City)
- Karel Marquez - an actress, model, singer, and TV host. (her mother is from Cebu City)
- Pinky Marquez - a singer and actress in theater, film and television. (Cebu City)
- Albert Martinez - actor, producer, and director. Dubbed as the "King of Philippine Teleseryes". (Cebu City)
- AZ Martinez - actress, beauty pageant queen and television host. (Cebu City)
- Olive May - actress, model, and singer. Former member of P-pop girl group Calista. (Cebu City)
- Bailey May - singer, model, actor, dancer, and television personality. 4th Teen Big Placer in Pinoy Big Brother: 737. Former member of global pop group Now United, representing the Philippines. (Cebu City)
- Kenneth Medrano - actor, model and dancer. "Ultimate Bae Grand Winner" of That's My Bae on Eat Bulaga!. (Cebu City)
- Alice Mendez - singer and actress. Tawag ng Tanghalan 1971 grand champion. (Cebu City)
- Dionne Monsanto - an actress and former Pinoy Big Brother housemate. (Cebu City)
- Diva Montelaba - actress and dancer. First Runner-up (First Princess) in the fifth season of StarStruck, a reality-based talent search show of GMA Network. (Cebu City)
- Marielle Montillano - a singer. She is a current mainstay of ASAP and is one-half of the Sidlak Bisdak tandem with JM Dela Cerna that become grand champion in Tawag ng Tanghalan Duets Season 1. (Tabogon)
- Kai Montinola - she is a Star Magic actress, singer, and model. She is the fourth big placer on the reality television series Pinoy Big Brother: Gen 11. (Cebu City)
- Vina Morales – actress, singer, entrepreneur and model. Dubbed as the "Ultimate Performer". (Bogo City)
- mrld - singer and songwriter. (Cebu City)
- Niel Murillo – singer, former member of BoybandPH. Winner of ABS-CBN's reality show Pinoy Boyband Superstar. (Bogo City)
- Mike "Pekto" Nacua - actor, comedian and television host. (Cebu City)
- Eda Nolan – actress and model. (Cebu City)
- Isabel Oli – actress and model. (Cebu City)
- Danita Paner - an actress and pop-rock singer. (her adoptive father is from Cebu)
- Tina Paner - an actress and singer. (her adoptive father is from Cebu)
- Allan Paule – a veteran film actor. (Cebu City)
- Eddie Peregrina - a singer and matinee idol of the 1970s. Dubbed as "The Original Jukebox King". (his mother is from Cebu)
- Pilar Pilapil - beauty queen, actress and model. Binibining Pilipinas Universe 1967. (Liloan)
- Maris Racal - an actress and singer. She is runner up in Pinoy Big Brother: All In. (her mother is from Lapu-lapu City)
- Rafi - pop and folk singer and songwriter. (Cebu City)
- Annabelle Rama - actress and talent manager. (Cebu City)
- Mat Ranillo III - a film and television actor. (his mother is from Cebu City)
- Suzette Ranillo - film, television and theater actress. (Cebu City)
- Keanna Reeves – actress and comedian. She won the first celebrity edition of the reality show Pinoy Big Brother in 2006. (Danao City)
- Sheryn Regis - singer, first runner-up in the television talent show Star in a Million in 2003. Dubbed as the "Crystal Voice of Asia". (Carcar City)
- Manilyn Reynes – multi-awarded actress, singer and television presenter. Regarded as a Philippine pop culture icon and dubbed as Star of the New Decade. (Cebu City)
- John Roa - singer and performer. Former member of Ex Battalion. (Cebu City)
- Dominic Roco - an actor and model. (Lapu-Lapu City)
- Felix Roco - an actor and model. (Lapu-Lapu City)
- Julius Roden - producer and director, Hailed as "The Father of Modern Cebuano Movies". (Cebu City)
- Chanda Romero - veteran film and television actress. (Cebu City)
- Rafael Rosell - an actor and model (his father is from Daanbantayan)
- Van Roxas - actor and TV personality. He placed as the 5th Star Dreamer of Pinoy Dream Academy Season 2. (Talisay City)
- Vicente Rubi - a musician best known for composing the Philippine Christmas carol Kasadyaa Ning Taknaa, which was translated into Tagalog, Ang Pasko ay Sumapit. (Cebu City)
- Jun Sabayton - actor, comedian, host and director. (Cebu City)
- Janella Salvador - actress and singer. (Cebu City)
- Caridad Sanchez – veteran film and television actress. (Mandaue City)
- Isabel Sandoval - filmmaker, actress and director. (Cebu City)
- Ingrid Sala Santamaria - a Filipina pianist. (Cebu City)
- Freddie Santos - film director, television director, theater director, and concert director. (Cebu City)
- Devon Seron – actress and TV personality. Teen Big 4th Placer on the final night of Pinoy Big Brother: Teen Clash 2010. (Cebu City)
- Gloria Sevilla – film actress, widely regarded as the "Queen of Visayan Movies" for her contributions in Visayan-made movies in the Philippines in the 50's and 60's. (Sibonga)
- Shoti - singer and songwriter. (Cebu City)
- Jay-R Siaboc - actor, singer, host and model. 1st runner up of Pinoy Dream Academy. (Toledo City)
- Akiko Solon - singer and actress. 5th placer in Star Power (TV program) in 2010. (Lapu-Lapu City)
- Val Sotto - an actor, singer, composer, comedian and politician. He was one of the lead vocalists of the Filipino band VST & Company. (his father is from Cebu City)
- Vic Sotto - an actor, comedian and television personality. He is also one of the three pioneer hosts of Eat Bulaga!. (his father is from Cebu City)
- Zandra Summer - actress, Runner-up in Protégé: The Battle for the Big Artista Break . (Cebu City)
- Max Surban - singer and songwriter. The "King of Visayan Song". (Cebu City)
- Albert Tiu - a classical pianist. (Cebu City)
- Panky Trinidad – singer, she was chosen to be one of the representatives to the World Championship of the Performing Arts. (Cebu City)
- Patricia Tumulak - actress, model, beauty queen and news anchor. (Mandaue City)
- Nicole Uysiuseng – actress and model. The second runner-up of the reality television show Pinoy Big Brother: Teen Edition Plus in 2008. (Cebu City)
- Vernie Varga - actress and OPM, jazz, and pop singer. She is famous in the '80s and '90s for her energetic performances. Known in the Philippine Music Industry as "The Vamp". She was also tagged as "The Queen of Corporate Shows" and "Queen of Philippine Jazz". (Bantayan)
- Raki Vega - Filipina singer, tagged as the "Ultimate Born Diva", which she won in the prestigious nationwide singing competition by ABS-CBN - Born Diva. She receive the coveted Walt Disney Legacy Award for her outstanding contributions to Disney. (Mandaue City)
- Lilian Velez - film actress and singer (Cebu City)
- Vivian Velez - actress who previously served as Director General of Film Academy of the Philippines. (Cebu City)
- Ian Veneracion - an actor, athlete, pilot, and singer (his mother is from Lilo-an)
- Donna Villa - was a film producer and actress. (Lapu-lapu City)
- Buboy Villar – actor, comedian, TV personality host (Cebu City)
- Kent Villarba - a singer. He is the grand champion of the singing competition Tawag ng Tanghalan Season 9. (Dalaguete)
- Emilio Villareal - a composer and musician. (Boljoon)
- Jessica Villarubin - singer, third grand champion of GMA's singing competition The Clash (TV program). (San Fernando)
- Redford White - actor and comedian. (Medellin)
- Richard Yap – actor, singer, businessman and politician.(Cebu City)
- Mitoy Yonting - a singer, comedian and actor. He was the winner of the first season of The Voice of the Philippines in 2013. (his mother is from Ginatilan)
- Slater Young – entrepreneur, actor, engineer, model and television personality. winner of ABS-CBN's Pinoy Big Brother: Unlimited in 2012. (Cebu City)
- Claudia Zobel - a film actress. (Mandaue City)
- Ben Zubiri – also known as Iyo Karpo was a composer, actor, and media personality in the Philippines. (Cebu City)

=== Musical bands ===
- Aggressive Audio - a rock band based in Cebu City. It is one of the numerous rock bands in Cebu that popularize rock songs using the Cebuano language, such songs are referred to as BisRock.
- Bethany - an alternative rock band formed during 2008 in Cebu. The band is primarily known for their melodic songwriting, intricate guitar hooks, and electric live performances.
- Cueshé - a pop rock band that broke into the mainstream OPM scene with radio hits like “Stay,” “Sorry,” and “Ulan,” blending melodic pop sensibilities with rock energy. The band formed in 1998 and hit mainstream in 2005.
- Dice and K9 - are a hip hop duo. The duo is composed of Wolfren Rosaroso (DiCE) and Miguel Calina (K-9). They became known for their 2004 single "Itsumo" with Honey Rosaroso (Hi-C), which first gained popularity in Cebu before receiving airplay in Manila.
- Franco - a rock band formed by Reyes in 1996, which is credited for having boosted the Cebu rock scene.
- Missing Filemon - a rock band from Cebu. The band was founded in 2002. They won a FAMAS Award for Best Theme Song for the 2007 film Confessional.
- Hastang - a modern rock band known for their all-original material and energetic presence in the local indie rock scene since 2005, with songs like “Oblivion” gaining airplay and establishing them in regional gigs.
- Junior Kilat - is a reggae, ska and dub band. They are a popular reggae band in Manila, winning a "Song Of The Year Award" in NU-107's Rock Awards for Ako Si M16.
- Urbandub - a rock band formed in 2000. Urbandub is the first indie band in the Philippines to release albums nationwide with the assistance of a major label.

=== Dance group ===
- CPDRC Dancing Inmates - is a collective of convicts at Cebu Provincial Detention and Rehabilitation Center (CPDRC), a maximum security prison in Cebu City. The inmates perform dance routines as part of their daily exercise and rehabilitation, and many of their performances are filmed and released online, making them a popular feature among fans and veritable online celebrities.

== Politics and government ==
Officials are sorted based on the following criteria, in order:

1. Constituency and/or jurisdiction. (National, local, non-officials)
2. Groupings of positions (i.e. Heads of branches, cabinet members, senators, etc.) in order of precedence.
3. Term start; Year during which they began serving in the senior-most position qualifying them for that grouping
4. Term end; Year during which their term ended. Incumbents are listed last.
5. Alphabetically by last name, then first name.

=== National government ===
==== Heads of government branches ====
- Sergio Osmeña Sr. (1878–1961) — 4th President of the Philippines (1944-1946), 1st Vice President of the Philippines (1935-1944), 2nd Secretary of Public Instruction, Health, and Public Welfare (1941-1944) and 14th Secretary of Public Instruction (1935-1939), 2nd Senate President pro tempore of the Philippines (1922-1934) and Senator from the 10th district (1922-1935), 1st Speaker of the House of Representatives (1907-1916) and Cebu 2nd DIstrict Representative (1907-1922), and 3rd Governor of Cebu (1904-1907). (Cebu City)
- Rodrigo Roa Duterte (b. 1945) - 16th President of the Philippines (2016-2022), 18th Mayor of Davao City (1988-1998; 2001-2010; 2013-2016), 11th Vice Mayor of Davao City and 3rd Davao City 1st District Representative (1998-2001). (his father is from Danao City)
- Mariano Jesús Cuenco y Diosómito (1888–1964) — 4th President of the Senate of the Philippines (1949-1951) and Senator (1953-1964; 1946-1951), 4th Secretary of Public Works and Communications (1936–1939), 7th Governor of Cebu (1931–1934), 2nd Cebu 5th District Representative (1912-1928), and 10th (and final) Municipal President of Cebu. (Carmen)
- Marcelo Briones Fernan (1927–1999) – 16th President of the Senate of the Philippines (1998-1999) and Senator (1995-1999), 18th Chief Justice of the Philippines (1988-1991), 111th Associate Justice of the Supreme Court (1986-1988), and Cebu Assemblyman (1984-1986). (Cebu City)
- Vicente "Tito" Castelo Sotto III (b. 1948) - 29th & 32nd President of the Senate of the Philippines (2018-2022; 2025-2026), 37th Senate President pro tempore of the Philippines (2026-present), 25th & 27th Senate Majority Leader (2010-2013; 2016-2018), 24th & 26th Senate Minority Leader (2002-2004; 2014-2015; july - sept. 2025; may - june 2026) and Senator (1992-2004; 2010-2022; 2025-present), 18th Chairman of the Dangerous Drugs Board (2008-2009) and 12th Vice Mayor of Quezon City (1988-1992). (his father is from Cebu City)
- Hilario Gebolingo Davide Jr. (b. 1935) — 20th Chief Justice of the Supreme Court of the Philippines (1998-2005), 17th Permanent Representative of the Philippines to the United Nations (2007-2010) and 15th Chairman of the Commission on Elections (1988-1990). (Argao)

==== Members of the Cabinet of the Philippines ====
- Dionisio Abella Jakosalem (1878–1931) — Secretary of Commerce and Communication of the United States Military Government of the Philippine Islands (1917-1922), 4th Governor of Cebu (1907-1912), and Cebu Provincial Board Member (1913-1914). (Dumanjug)
- Sotero Barte Cabahug (1891–1963) — 9th Secretary of Public Works and Communications (1945-1946), 7th Secretary of National Defense (1954-1956), Associate Justice of the Court of Appeals (1956-1961), and 8th Governor of Cebu (1934-1937). (Mandaue City)
- Jesus Estanislao (born 1939) — Secretary of the Department of Finance (1990-1992) and Socio-economic Planning Secretary and concurrent Director-General of the National Economic and Development Authority (NEDA) from (1989-1990). (Cebu City)
- Manuel Alesna Cuenco (1907–1970) — 13th Secretary of Health (1964-1965), Administrator of the Overseas Employment Council (1962-1963), and 14th Governor of Cebu (1946-1951). (Carmen)
- Vicente Gonzales Duterte (1911–1968) — Secretary of General Services. (1965-1968) Governor of Davao (1959-1965). (Danao City)
- Francisco Famor Remotigue (1908–1995) — Secretary of Social Welfare (1966-1967), 17th Governor of Cebu, (1956-1959), 1st Vice Governor of Cebu (1959-1961), and Cebu Provincial Board Member (1956-1959). (Argao)
- Rene Gandiongco Espina (1929–2019) — 20th Secretary of the Public Works, Transportation, and Communication (1968-1969), Senator (1969-1972), and 18th Governor of Cebu (1963-1968). (Cebu City)
- Lourdes Reynes Quisumbing (1921–2017) — Secretary of Education, Culture and Sports (1986-1989). (Cebu City)
- Emilio Mario "Lito" Renner Osmeña Jr. (1938–2021) — chief economic adviser to the president (1993-1997) and 21st governor of Cebu (1988–1992). (Cebu City)
- Joseph Felix Mari "Ace" Hotchkiss Durano (b. 1970) — Secretary of Tourism (2004–2010), general manager of the Philippine Tourism Authority (PTA), and 9th Cebu 5th District Representative (1998-2004). (Danao City)
- Cerge Mamites Remonde (1958–2010) — Press Secretary. (2009-2010) Former chairman of Radio Philippines Network, one of the largest media networks in the Philippines. (Argao)
- Rene Durano Almendras (b. 1960) — 8th Cabinet Secretary (2012-2016), 9th Secretary of Energy (2010-2012), and Acting Secretary of Foreign Affairs (2016) under President Benigno Aquino III. (Cebu City)
- Christina Garcia Frasco (b. 1981) — Secretary of Tourism (2022–present). (Liloan)

==== Members of the Senate of the Philippines ====
- Filemon Yap Sotto (1872–1966) — Senator from the 10th district (1916-1922), Member of the 1934 Constitutional Convention (1934-1935), and 1st Cebu 3rd District Representative (1916-1922). (Cebu City)
- Celestino Rodriguez y Lasala (1872–1955) — Senator from the 10th district (1916-1925) and 1st Cebu 1st District Representative (1907-1912). (Bogo City)
- Hermenegildo Villanueva y Teves (1876 – 1941) – Senator from 8th district (1919 - 1931), 2nd Governor of Negros Oriental (1931-1935) and 2nd Negros Oriental 1st District Representative (1909-1916). (his father is from Cebu City)
- Troadio Dayagro Galicano (1870–1935) — Senator from the 11th District (1925-1931) and 1st Cebu 5th District Representative (1907-1912). (Carcar City)
- Pedro Rodríguez y Lasala (1868–1932) — Senator from the 10th district (1925-1931), 1st Cebu 7th District Representative (1907-1910), and Presidente Municipal of Bogo (1898-1903). (Medellin)
- Vicente Yap Sotto, Sr. (1877–1950) - Senator (1946–1950) and 2nd Cebu 2nd District Representative. (Cebu City)
- Manuel Cabahug Briones (1893–1957) — Senator (1951-1957) and Senator from the 10th district (1931-1935), 4th Cebu 1st District Representative, 51st Associate Justice of the Supreme Court of the Philippines (1945-1949) and Associate Justice of the Philippine Court of Appeals (1942–1945). (Mandaue City)
- Vicente Rama (1857–1956) — Senator (1945-1947), 2nd Cebu 3rd District Representative (1922–28; 1934–35), 2nd Mayor of Cebu City (1938-1940), and Member of the Cebu Municipal Council (1916-1922). Recognized as the Father of the Cebu City Charter. (Cebu City)
- Rafael Corro Martinez (1873 – 1953) – Senator (1945-1946) and 13th Governor of Leyte (1936-1941). (his mother is from Naga City)
- Alejandro "Landring" Durano Almendras (1919–1995) — Senator (1959-1972), Governor of Davao (1951–1958), and Governor of Davao del Sur (1986-1988). (Danao City)
- Sergio "Serging" Veloso Osmeña Jr. (1916–1984) — Senator (1965-1971) and Governor of Cebu (1951-1955). (Cebu City)
- Lorenzo Guivelondo Teves (1918 – 1996) – Senator (1967-1972), 10th Governor of Negros Oriental (1978-1986) and 6th Negros Oriental 1st District Representative (1946-1949; 1953-1967). (his mother is from Cebu City)
- John Henry "Sonny" Renner Osmeña (1935–2021) — 18th Senate President pro tempore of the Philippines (1999-2000) and Senator (1971-1972; 1987-1995; 1998-2004), 11th Cebu 2nd District Representative, 11th Cebu 2nd District (1969-1971) and 10th 3rd District Representative (1995-1998), 21st Mayor of Cebu City (1986-1987, OIC), and Mayor of Toledo (2013-2019). (Cebu City)
- Jesus Marino "Rene" Gandiongco Espina (1929–2019) - Senator (1969–1972), Secretary of the Public Works, Transportation, and Communication (1968–1969) and 18th Governor of Cebu (1963–1969). (Cebu City)
- Ernesto Falar Herrera Sr. (1942–1955) — Senator (1987-1998). (Samboan)
- Sergio "Serge" R. Osmeña III (b. 1943) — Senator (1995-2007; 2010-2016), Chair of the Senate Banks, Financial Institutions and Currencies Committee (2010-2016) and Chair of the Senate Energy Committee (2010-2016). (Cebu City)
- Emmanuel "Manny" Dapidran Pacquiao Sr. (b. 1978) — Senator (2016-2022) and 4th Sarangani District Representative (2010-2016). (his father is from Pinamungahan)

==== Justices of the Supreme Court and Court of Appeals of the Philippines ====
- Regino C. Hermosisima Jr. (b. 1927) — 4-termer regular member of the Judicial and Bar Council. 136th Associate Justice of the Supreme Court of the Philippines (1995-1997). 15th Associate Justice of the Sandiganbayan (1986-1995). (Sibonga)

==== Non-cabinet executive agency heads and other national officials/figures ====
- Paulino Arandia Gullas (1891–1945) — Member of the 1934 Constitutional Convention (1934-1935), Cebu 2nd District Representative (1925-1928), and Cebu City Assemblyman (1943-1944). (Cebu City)
- Cesar Abear Kintanar (born 1902) — Constitutional Convention delegate from Cebu (1934). (Argao)
- Juan Fuentes Alcazaren (1891—1959) — Director of Bureau of Lands (1945), and Undersecretary of Department of Foreign Affairs (1958–1959). He was Member of the House of Representatives for the old 4th legislative district of Cebu (1925–1934). (Argao)
- Leonila "Inday" Dimataga Garcia (1906–1994) — 8th First Lady of the Philippines (1957-1961) and wife of President Carlos P. Garcia. (Lapu-Lapu City)
- Napoleon Rama (1923 - 2016) - Vice President of the 1971 Constitutional Convention and the Floor Leader of the 1986 Constitutional Commission. In 2011, he was awarded the Philippine Legion of Honor, the country's highest recognition, with the rank of Grand Commander on the 25th anniversary of the First EDSA Revolution by President Benigno Aquino III. (Cebu City)
- Florentino Sanico Solon (1931–2020) — Deputy Minister of Health (1983–1986) and Executive Director of the National Nutrition Council (1974-1979). (Cebu City)
- Regalado "Dodong" Estrella Maambong (1939–2011) — Member of the 1986 Constitutional Commission, COMELEC Commissioner (1991-1998), and Cebu Assemblyman (1984-1986). (Santa Fe)
- Aniano Aguilar Desierto (b. 1935) — 2nd Ombudsman of the Philippines (1995-2002). (Cebu City)
- Winston Fiel Garcia (b. 1958) — President and General Manager of the Government Service Insurance System (GSIS) (2001-2010) . (Cebu City)
- Raymond Mendoza (b. 1962) — Assistant Secretary of Environment and Natural Resources (2001-2005), Trade Union Congress Party (TUCP) Partylist Representative (2009-2013; 2013-2016; 2022-Present), and Director of the Philippine National Oil Company (2006-2009). (Cebu City)
- Adelino Sitoy (1936–2021) — Secretary of the Presidential Legislative Liaison Office (2016-2021), Cebu Assemblyman (1984-1986), Mayor of Cordova (2007-2016), and Vice Mayor of Cordova (2016). (Cordova)
- Geraldine Faith Abracia Econg (born 1967) — a jurist who currently serves as the Presiding Justice of the Sandiganbayan, the Philippines' anti-graft court (2025–present). (Cebu City)

==== International positions ====
- Pedro Lopez (1906–1957) — Appointed to the Philippine Rehabilitation Commission, delegate to the first United Nations General Assembly and associate prosecutor International Military Tribunal for the Far East. (Cebu City)
- Democrito Tolo Mendoza - a lawyer and trade union leader. He was considered one of the founders of the country's labor movement and champion of Filipino workers' rights in the country being the founder of the Associated Labor Union. He founded the ASEAN Trade Union Council and was a member of the governing body of the International Labour Organization (ILO) in Geneva.(Liloan)
- Antonio Veloso Cuenco (1936–2020) — Secretary General of the ASEAN Inter-Parliamentary Assembly (AIPA) (2010-2013), Cebu City South District Representative (1987-1998; 2001-2010). (Cebu City)

=== Global politicians with Cebuano roots ===
==== Canada ====
- Yvonne Clarke (Yukon) - a politician who represents Whistle Bend North, and formerly Porter Creek Centre, on the Yukon Legislative Assembly. She has served as Speaker of the Yukon Legislative Assembly since 2025. She is the first Filipino Canadian Speaker in Canadian parliamentary history.
- Mable Elmore (British Columbia) - a politician who represents the Vancouver-Kensington electoral district in the Legislative Assembly of British Columbia. she was first elected as a Member of the Legislative Assembly (MLA) in the 2009 provincial election. Currently the Parliamentary Secretary for Anti-Racism Initiatives.
- Tany Yao (Alberta) - a politician who was elected in the 2015 and 2019 Alberta general elections to represent the electoral district of Fort McMurray-Wood Buffalo in the 29th and 30th Alberta Legislatures.

==== United States of America ====
- Nikki Fortunato Bas (California) - a politician serving on the Alameda County Board of Supervisors for the 5th district. She was previously a member of the Oakland, California, City Council from the 2nd district from 2019 to 2024, serving as the Council President since 2021, and briefly as interim Mayor of Oakland.
- Rachele Lamosao (Hawaii) - a politician serving in the Hawaii Senate for the 19th district. She previously served in the Hawaii House of Representatives, representing the 36th district (Waipahu). In December 2025 she was appointed to the Senate.
- Bennette Misalucha (Hawaii) - a politician who served as a member of the Hawaii Senate for the 16th district from 2020 to 2022.
- Rita Sanders (Nebraska) - a politician serving as a member of the Nebraska Legislature, representing the 45th district. Sanders served as the mayor of Bellevue, Nebraska, from (2010 - 2018).
- Tyler Dos Santos-Tam (Hawaii) - a politician serving as a member of the Honolulu City Council, representing District 6, which encompasses Downtown Honolulu, Kakaʻako, Kalihi, and Nuʻuanu.

=== Local government ===
==== Governors of Cebu ====
- Julio Llorente y Aballe (1863–1955) — 1st Governor of Cebu (1899–1901), Governor of Samar (1902–1903), and Vice President of the Cebu Provincial Council (1898-1899). (Argao)
- Juan Climaco y Faller (1859–1907) — 2nd Governor of Cebu (1902–1906). (Toledo City)
- Manuel A. Roa y Flores (1872–?) — 5th Governor of Cebu (1912–1922). (Cebu City)
- Arsenio Veloso Cliamco (1870–1952) — 6th Governor of Cebu (1922–1930). (Toledo City)
- Buenaventura Perez Rodriguez (1893–1940) — 9th Governor of Cebu (1937–1940), 5th Cebu 1st District Representative, and Provincial Board Member (1921-1931). (Bogo City)
- Hilario Abellana y Hermosa (1896–1945) — 10th Governor of Cebu (1941–1943) and Cebu 2nd District Representative (1934-1941); executed by the Imperial Japanese Army. (Cebu City)
- Jose Delgado — 11th Governor of Cebu (1943–1944), Cebu Assemblyman (1943–44), and 3rd Mayor of Cebu City. (Cebu City)
- Jose Leyson y Floreta (1895–1945) — 12th Governor of Cebu (1944–1945) and Cebu Assemblyman (1943–44). (Cebu City)
- Fructoso Barte Cabahug (1897–1961) — 13th Governor of Cebu (1945–1946). (Mandaue City)
- Jose Lorenzo Briones (1916–?) — 16th Governor of Cebu (1955–1961) and 10th Cebu 2nd District Representative. (Mandaue City)
- Osmundo Genson Rama (1914-1998) — 19th Governor of Cebu (1969–1976; 1986–1988), 5th Vice Governor of Cebu (1968-1969), and Cebu City Councilor (1955-1963). (Cebu City)
- Eduardo Rivera Gullas Sr. (b. 1930) — 20th Governor of Cebu (1976–1986), 10th Cebu 1st District Representative (1992-2001; 2004-2013; 2019–2022), 8th Cebu 3rd District Representative (1969-1972), and Mayor of Talisay City (2001-2004; 2016-2019). (Talisay City)
- Vicente Low dela Serna (1951–2018) — Governor of Cebu (1992–1995) and 9th Cebu 6th District Representative. (Mandaue City)
- Pablo Paras Garcia (1925–2021) — 23rd Governor of Cebu (1995–2004), 6th Vice Governor of Cebu (1969-1971), and Cebu 2nd District (2007-2013) and 3rd District Representative (1987-1995). (Dumanjug)
- Gwendolyn Fiel Garcia (b. 1955) — 24th Governor of Cebu (2004–2012 and 2019–2025). (Cebu City)
- Agnes Almendras Magpale (b. 1942) — Acting Governor of Cebu (2012-2013), 16th Vice Governor of Cebu, Mayor of Danao City (2001-2010; 2013-2022). (Danao City)
- Hilario "Junjun" Perez Davide III (b. 1964) — 26th Governor of Cebu (2013–2019), 17th Vice Governor of Cebu (2019-2025). (Cebu City)
- Pamela Silagan Baricuatro (b. 1966) — 27th Governor of Cebu. (2025–present). (Pinamungajan)

==== Governors of other provinces ====
- Joaquin Ortega (1868 - 1943) — 2nd Governor of La Union (1901-1904). Lieutenant Governor of Abra (1904-1914). (Cebu City)
- Filomeno Orbeta Caseñas (1888 - 1944) - 8th Governor of Bohol (1925 - 1931). (Cebu City)
- Gedeon Gador Quijano (1910 - 1989) — 5th Governor of Misamis Occidental (1946-1967). (Alcantara)
- David Belarmino Tirol (1933 - 2022) – 22nd Governor of Bohol (1992 - 1995) and Vice Governor of Bohol (1967–1984). (Cebu City)
- Marc Douglas Chan Cagas IV (born 1976) – 9th Governor of Davao del Sur (2021-2022) and Vice Governor of Davao del Sur (2025–present). (Cebu City)
- Dulce Ann Kintanar Hofer (born 1967) — 4th Governor of Zamboanga Sibugay (2022-present). (Cebu City)
- Sharee Ann Tee Tan (born 1982) — 22nd Governor of Samar (2022-present). (Cebu City)

==== Vice governors of Cebu ====
- Ramon "Nito" Duterte Durano III (b. 1948) — 8th Vice Governor of Cebu (1980-1984), Cebu 5th District Representative (1987-1988), Mayor (2001-2010; 2013-2022) and Mayor-elect (2025) of Danao City, and Vice Mayor of Danao City (2010-2013; 2022–Present).

==== Members of the House of Representatives of the Philippines ====
- Tomas Noel Alonso - 3rd Cebu 7th District (1914-1919) and 3rd Cebu 5th District Representative (1928-1931).
- Vicente Sarmiento Urgello - 2nd Cebu 3rd District Representative (1916-1922). (Carcar)
- Miguel Garces Raffiñan - 3rd Cebu 6th District Representative (1916-1922; 1931-1934; 1939-1941) and 9th Mayor of Cebu City (1947-1951).
- Nicolas Mercado Rafols - 4th Cebu 6th District Representative (1922-1925; 1928-1931; 1934-1938; 1945-1947). (Toledo City)
- Tereso Mondigo Dosdos - 6th Cebu 1st District Representative (1934–35; 1938-1941); known for being the first Municipal Court Judge and Registrar of Deeds of Cebu, and the first lawyer from Borbon, Cebu
- Agustin Yreneo Kintanar - 5th Cebu 3rd District (1935-1938) and 4th 4th District Representative (1934-1935; 1938-1941; 1935-1949)
- Maximo Jaen Noel - 3rd Cebu 3rd District Representative (1938-1941; 1945-1949; 1953-1965), 3rd District Provincial Board Member (1921-1925), Mayor of Carcar (1916-1922), and Member of the Carcar Municipal Council (until 1916).
- Roque Villarino Desquitado - 7th Cebu 7th District Representative (1939-1941). (Bantayan)
- Jose Chiong Veloso Rodriguez - 8th Cebu 7th District Representative (1945-1949) and 11th Mayor of Cebu City (1951-1952).
- Leandro Aballe Tojong - 5th Cebu 5th District (1946-1949) and 8th Cebu 2nd District Representative (1949-1952) and 5th Mayor of Cebu City (1945-1946). (Ginatilan)
- Primitivo Nacario Sato - 6th Cebu 3rd District Representative (1949-1953). (Carcar)
- Nicolas Gandiongco Escario - 9th Cebu 7th District Representative (1950-1957), 6th Mayor of Cebu City (1945-1946). (Bantayan)
- Isidro Casamura Kintanar - 7th Cebu 4th District Representative (1953-1968) and Mayor of Argao (1952-1954).
- Santiago Villagonzalo Lucero - 7th Cebu 6th District Representative (1953-1956) and Mayor of Ronda (1934-1936).
- Crisologo Andrade Abines - 12th Cebu 2nd District Representative (1987-1998) and Mayor of Santander, Cebu.
- Raul Veloso del Mar - 1st Cebu City North District Representative. (1987-1998; 2001-2010; 2013–2020)
- Nerissa Soon-Ruiz - 10th Cebu 6th District Representative (1992-1998; 2001-2010) and Mandaue City Councilor. (2019-2025)
- Nancy Roa Cuenco - 2nd Cebu City South District Representative. (1998-2001)
- Raoul Borromeo del Mar - 2nd Cebu City North District Representative. (1998-2001)
- Joy Augustus Go Young - PROMDI Representative (1998-2001), 17th Vice Mayor of Cebu City (2010-2013)
- Jose "Dodong" Rivera Gullas - 11th Cebu 1st District Representative (2001-2004)
- Ramon "Red" Hotchkiss Durano VI - Cebu 5th District Representative (2005-2013; 2016-2019) and Vice Mayor of Danao City (2013-2016)
- Benhur Lago Salimbangon - 11th Cebu 4th District Representative (2007-2010; 2010-2019) and 4th District Board Member (1992-1998). (Medellin)
- Pablo John Garcia - 3rd District Representative (2007-2013; 2019–present) (Cebu City)
- Tomas "Tommy" de la Rama Osmeña (b. 1948) — 3rd Cebu City South District Representative (2010-2013), 24th Mayor of Cebu City (1987-1995; 2001-2010; 2016–2019), and 22nd Vice Mayor of Cebu City. (2025–present)
- Gabriel Luis "Luigi" Romualdez Quisumbing (b. 1979) — 12th Cebu 6th District Representative (2010-2016), 20th Mayor of Mandaue (2016-2019). (Mandaue City)
- Rachel "Cutie" Borromeo Del Mar (b. 1966) — 3rd Cebu City North District Representative. (2010-2013; 2022–Present)
- Rodrigo "Bebot" Abellana Abellanosa (b. 1961) — Cebu City South District Representative. (2013-2022)
- Wilfredo "Willy" Sardido Caminero (b. 1954) — 15th Cebu 2nd District Representative (2013-2022), 2nd District Provincial Board Member (2007-2022), and Mayor (1998-2007), Vice Mayor (1992-1998), and Municipal Councilor (1988-1992) of Argao
- Gerald Anthony "Samsam" Vargas Gullas Jr. (b. 1984) — 12th Cebu 1st District Representative (2013-2019), Mayor of Talisay City (2019–Present).
- Jonas Cabungcal Cortes (b. 1966) — 13th Cebu 6th District Representative (2016-2019) and 19th Mayor of Mandaue (2007-2016; 2019-2024)
- Peter John Durano Calderon (b. 1961) — 13th Cebu 7th District Representative (2016-2025), 2nd District Provincial Board Member (2007-2016), and Mayor of Samboan. (2001-2007)
- Vincent Franco "Duke" Domingo Frasco (b. 1980) — Deputy House Speaker (2022–2025), Cebu 5th District Representative (2019–Present), and Mayor of Liloan (2007-2016)
- Edsel Amatong Galeos (b. 1959) — 16th Cebu 2nd District Representative (2022–Present), 2nd District Provincial Board Member (2016-2022), and Mayor of Argao. (2007-2016)
- Emmarie Dolores "Lolypop" Mabanag Ouano-Dizon (b. 1970) — 14th Cebu 6th District Representative (2019-2022), 1st Mandaue City Lone District Representative (2022-Present), and Mandaue City Councilor. (2010–2016)
- Sonny Avado Lagon (b. 1969) — Ako Bisaya Partylist Representative and 1st Nominee (2019–Present)
- Janice Zamora Salimbangon (b. 1966) — 13th Cebu 4th District Representative (2019-2025)
- Maria Cynthia "Cindi" King Chan (b. 1968) — 4th Lapu-Lapu City Lone District Representative (2022-2025) and Mayor of Lapu-Lapu City (2025–present)
- Daphne Arias Lagon (b. 1978) — 15th Cebu 6th District Representative (2022–present)
- Eduardo "Edu" Roa Rama Jr. (b. 1978) — 5th Cebu City 2nd District Representative (2022–present)
- Junard "Ahong" Quirante Chan (b. 1968) — 5th Lapu-Lapu City Lone District Representative (2025—present) and Mayor of Lapu-Lapu City (2019-2025)
- Karen Hope Flores Garcia (b. 1974) — 14th Cebu 3rd District Representative (2025–present)

==== Members of the Cebu Provincial Board ====
- Julian Bacus Daan a.k.a. Teban Escudero (1945–2019) — 1st District Provincial Board Member (1995-2004; 2007-2016) and Talisay City Councilor (1987-1995; 2016-2019).
- Thadeo "Teddy" Zambo Ouano (1944–2016) — 6th District Provincial Board Member (2010-2016) and 17th Mayor of Mandaue City. (1998-2007)

==== Mayors ====
- Vicente Hermosa "Nyor Inting" Garces (1887–1971) — Mayor of Talisay. (1925–1937)
- Mario Diez Ortiz (1922–2015) — 16th Mayor of Cebu City (1963), 6th Vice Mayor of Cebu City (1960-1963), and Cebu City Councilor. (1959–1960)
- Florencio S. Urot (1904–1975) — 18th Mayor of Cebu City (1971) and Cebu City Councilor. (1940–1971)
- Ronald Regis Duterte (1934–2016) — 20th Mayor of Cebu City (1983–1986), 9th Vice Mayor of Cebu City (1980–1983), and Cebu City Councilor. (1963–1980)
- Alfredo "Ingkoy Pedong" Mendoza Ouano (1924–2014) — 16th Mayor of Mandaue City (1988-1998), Vice Mayor of Mandaue (1972–1986), and Mandaue City Councilor (1956–1965)
- Alvin Biano Garcia (b. 1946) — 25th Mayor of Cebu City (1995-2001), 14th Vice Mayor of Cebu City. (1988-1995)
- Valdemar Mendiola Chiong (b. 1960) — Mayor of Naga, Cebu. (2006–2016; 2019–2020; 2022–Present)
- Michael "Mike" Lopez Rama (b. 1954) — 26th Mayor of Cebu City (2010–2016; 2021–2024), 16th Vice Mayor of Cebu City (2001–2010; 2019–2021), and City Councilor (1992–2001)
- Edgardo Colina Labella (1951–2021) — 27th Mayor of Cebu City (2019–2021), 19th Vice Mayor of Cebu City (2013–2019), and Cebu City Councilor from the 1st (North) District. (1998–2001; 2004–2013)
- Raymond Alvin Neri Garcia (b. 1977) — 28th Mayor of Cebu City (2024–Present), 21st Vice Mayor of Cebu City, (2022-2024) and Cebu City Councilor from the 1st (North) District. (2016–2022)
- Nestor Dionson Archival Sr. (b. 1958) — 29th Mayor of Cebu City (2025–Present) and Cebu City Councilor from the 1st (North) District. (1995–1998, 2001–2010, 2013–2016, 2019–2025)

==== Vice mayors ====
- Ramón Abasolo Abellanosa (1904–1984) — 5th Vice Mayor of Cebu City (1957-1958) and Cebu City Councilor. (c. 1940s)
- Donaldo Cabañes Hontiveros (b. 1977) — 20th Vice Mayor of Cebu City (2021-2022; 2024-2025) and Cebu City Councilor from the 2nd (South) District. (2019–2021; 2022–2024)

==== City and municipal councilors ====
- Máximo Macapobre — 19th-century founder and councilor of New Hinulawan, now part of Toledo City.
- Margarita Vargas Osmeña (b. 1949) — Acting Mayor of Cebu City (2016) and Cebu City Councilor from the 2nd (South) District. (2010–2019) (Cebu City)

=== Non-government officials ===
- Terry Alderete - Filipino-American businesswoman recognized for her leadership in the Latino community in California; inducted into the Alameda County Women’s Hall of Fame and recipient of multiple entrepreneurship and community awards. (her father was from Cebu)
- Chad Errol Ramirez Booc - a Filipino volunteer Lumad teacher and activist. He was known for his vocal stance on several issues both on-ground and in social media. (Cebu City)
- Rudolfo Austria Fernandez, Sr. - a prominent labor leader, trade unionist and staunch opposer of the late President Ferdinand Marcos. He was one of the original organizers of the Trade Union Congress of the Philippines (TUCP/KMP) in 1975 and helped draft, develop, and establish its constitution and by-laws. (Sibonga)
- Winefreda Amit Geonzon - a lawyer and social justice activist. She was the founder and executive director of the Free Legal Assistance Volunteers Association (Free LAVA), a service organization that provides free legal assistance for poor prisoners. For her efforts, she received the Right Livelihood Award in 1984. (Bogo City)
- Pascual Borbon Racuyal (1911–2004) — Persistent nuisance presidential candidate from 1935 until 1986. (Cebu City)
- Hilario Camino Moncado (1898–1956) — 1946 presidential candidate and founder of the religious and political group Filipino Crusaders World Army, colloquially known as the Moncadistas. (Balamban)

== Sports ==
=== Boxing ===
- Christian Araneta - a Filipino professional boxer. He has won five consecutive fights, with four coming inside the distance, since his loss to Nontshinga in April 2021. (Cebu City)
- Jay Baricuatro - a professional boxer. He competed in the men's 50 kg event at the 2025 World Boxing Championships. (Talisay City)
- Mark Anthony Barriga - a professional boxer who challenged for the IBF mini-flyweight title in 2018. He represented Philippines at the 2012 Summer Olympics, reaching the round of 16 of the light-flyweight bracket. (Danao City)
- Bert Batawang - a professional boxer. Throughout his career, Batawang achieved notable success in both local and international boxing, winning several titles including the Philippines Boxing Federation (PBF) Light Flyweight title. He also fought for the IBF Light Flyweight World Championship but fell short in his attempt against Mexican boxer Ulises Solis in 2007. (Cebu City)
- Dominador Calumarde - a professional boxer who competed at the 1964 Summer Olympics and 1968 Summer Olympics. (Cebu City)
- Kevin Jake Cataraja - a professional boxer. He is the current Oriental and Pacific Boxing Federation (OPBF) Super Flyweight champion. (Cebu City)
- Frank Cedeno - is a British-Filipino former professional boxer in the Flyweight division. (Talisay City)
- Arlo Chavez - a boxer who competed at the 1992 Summer Olympics. He is a gold medalist in the Asian Amateur Boxing Championships and is the most successful Filipino boxer in the Southeast Asian Games with four gold medals. (Bantayan)
- Eric Chavez - former professional boxer who competed from 1985 to 1998. He held the International Boxing Federation (IBF) mini-flyweight title from 1989 to 1990. (Talisay City)
- Ronald Chavez - former professional boxer who competed at the 1992 Summer Olympics and is currently one of the coaches of the Philippine national boxing team. (Bantayan)
- Gabriel "Flash" Elorde - a professional boxer considered one of the best Filipino boxers of all time. He won the lineal super featherweight title in 1960 and he won the inaugural WBC and WBA super featherweight titles in 1963. (Bogo City)
- Juan Martin Elorde - is a professional boxer. He is a former WBO Asia Pacific featherweight and WBO Oriental lightweight champion. (Bogo City)
- Juan Miguel Elorde - a professional boxer. He is the reigning WBO Asia Pacific super bantamweight champion and goes undefeated since he won the championship title in 2015. He is currently ranked no. 4 WBO Super Bantamweight division. (Bogo City)
- Rocky Fuentes - professional boxer. Throughout his career, he held several regional titles, including the Oriental and Pacific Boxing Federation (OPBF) flyweight title and the Philippines Games and Amusement Board (GAB) flyweight title. (Cebu City)
- Mercito Gesta - a professional boxer who challenged for the IBF lightweight title in 2012 and the WBA lightweight title in 2018. At regional level he held the WBO-NABO lightweight title in 2018. (Mandaue City)
- Rodel Mayol - a former professional boxer and the former WBC Light Flyweight World Champion. (Mandaue City)
- Joe Noynay - a Filipino professional boxer, who held the WBO Asia Pacific super featherweight title between 2019 and 2022. (Bogo City)
- Felipe Nunag - also known as Boy Nunag, a Filipino boxer who competed in the 1936 Summer Olympics at Berlin. (Balamban)
- Manny Pacquiao - a professional boxer. He is widely regarded as one of the greatest professional boxers of all time, becoming the only eight-division world champion in boxing history. (Pinamungahan)
- Rolando Pascua - a former professional boxer. He held the WBC light-flyweight title from 1990 to 1991 and challenged for the IBF super-flyweight title in 1993. (Cebu City)
- Efren Tabanas - is a professional boxer. He competed in the men's flyweight event at the 1984 Summer Olympics and he defeated Chen King-ming of Taiwan before losing to Heo Yong-mo of South Korea. (Cebu City)
- Jhack Tepora - is a professional boxer who is the former interim World Boxing Association Featherweight champion. (Cebu City)
- Malcolm Tuñacao - a professional southpaw boxer in the flyweight division. He is a former WBC and lineal flyweight champion. (Mandaue City)
- Bernabe Villacampo - was a Philippine boxer who took the WBA World Flyweight Championship in a fifteen round Unanimous Decision on 1969 against Hiroyuki Ebihara. (Toledo City)

=== Basketball ===
- Marco Alcaraz - former varsity basketball player at San Sebastian College-Recoletos. (Cebu City)
- Alfie Almario - professional basketball player in the Philippine Basketball Association (PBA). He is a former San Miguel Beermen player for PBA. (Cebu City)
- Dondon Ampalayo – retired professional basketball who played for San Miguel Beermen in the Philippine Basketball Association (PBA). (Cebu City)
- Boy Cabahug - professional basketball player in Philippine Basketball Association (PBA). He also become the head coach of the University of Visayas Green Lancers varsity team. (Cebu City)
- Nic Cabañero - a professional basketball player who is part of the Biñan Tatak Gel of the Maharlika Pilipinas Basketball League. (Lapu-lapu City)
- Jerry Codiñera - a former coach and retired professional basketball player of the Philippine Basketball Association (PBA). He is nicknamed the "Defense Minister" for his prowess at the defensive end. (Cebu City)
- Paul Desiderio - professional basketball player for the Mindoro Tamaraws of the Maharlika Pilipinas Basketball League (MPBL). He previously played for the Blackwater Bossing of the Philippine Basketball Association (PBA), he was also a former college varsity player for the UP Fighting Maroons. (Liloan)
- Barkley Eboña - professional basketball player for the TNT Tropang Giga of the Philippine Basketball Association (PBA). He is a former Alaska Aces, Blackwater Bossing and Converge FiberXers player. (Cebu City)
- Nico Elorde - a professional basketball player for the Abra Weavers of the Maharlika Pilipinas Basketball League (MPBL). (Bogo City)
- Simon Enciso - a professional basketball player for the TNT Tropang 5G of the Philippine Basketball Association (PBA). (Cebu City)
- Ernesto Estrada - professional basketball player. He played for San Miguel Beermen, Toyota Super Corollas and Great Taste Coffee Makers in Philippine Basketball Association (PBA). (Cebu City)
- June Mar Fajardo – professional basketball player for the San Miguel Beermen of the Philippine Basketball Association (PBA). He is also known by his nickname "The Kraken" for his extraordinary size and finesse against opposing big men. (Pinamungajan)
- Ramon Fernandez - professional basketball player and current commissioner of the Philippine Sports Commission. He won four PBA Most Valuable Player awards and a record of 19 PBA titles. (Cebu City)
- Robbie Herndon - a professional basketball player for the NLEX Road Warriors of the Philippine Basketball Association (PBA). (Lapu-lapu City)
- Brian Heruela - professional basketball player. He currently play for the TNT Tropang Giga of the Philippine Basketball Association (PBA). (Cebu City)
- Dondon Hontiveros – professional basketball player and coach. He served as an assistant coach for the Phoenix Super LPG Fuel Masters of the Philippine Basketball Association (PBA). (Cebu City)
- Raymar Jose - professional basketball player for the Meralco Bolts of the Philippine Basketball Association (PBA). He was selected 3rd overall by Blackwater Elite in the 2017 PBA draft. (Cebu City)
- Reed Juntilla - professional basketball player who is currently a free agent. Juntilla last played for the Zamboanga Valientes of the Pilipinas VisMin Super Cup. He also played in Philippine Basketball Association (PBA). (Carmen)
- Rob Labagala - professional basketball player. He last played for the Talk 'N Text Tropang Texters of the Philippine Basketball Association (PBA). He also played for Barako Bull Energy and Barangay Ginebra San Miguel in (PBA).(Talisay City)
- Ramon Manulat - a basketball player. He was member of the Philippine National Team that won a gold medal at the 1954 Asian Games and a bronze medal at the 1954 FIBA World Championship. (Cebu City)
- Will McAloney - a professional basketball player for the Quezon Huskers of the Maharlika Pilipinas Basketball League (MPBL). (Naga City)
- Calvin Oftana - professional basketball player for the TNT Tropang Giga of the Philippine Basketball Association (PBA). He played college basketball for the San Beda Red Lions in the NCAA. (Danao City)
- Bibiano Ouano - professional basketball player. He competed in the men's tournament at the 1936 Summer Olympics. (Cebu City)
- Manny Paner - professional basketball player. He is one of the 25 Greatest Players of Philippine Basketball Association and PBA Hall of Fame in 2007 (Cebu City)
- Kyle Pascual - a professional basketball player for the Meralco Bolts of the Philippine Basketball Association (PBA). (Cebu City)
- Mike Phillips - a professional basketball player for the San Juan Knights of the Maharlika Pilipinas Basketball League (MPBL). He played his entire college career with the De La Salle Green Archers, where he won two UAAP men's basketball championships. (Cebu City)
- Roger Pogoy – professional basketball player for the TNT Tropang Giga of the Philippine Basketball Association (PBA). (Minglanilla)
- Eliud Poligrates - professional basketball player. He then played in Liga Pilipinas and the PBA D-League before he was drafted by the Talk 'N Text Tropang Texters in the 2013 Philippine Basketball Association (PBA) draft. He later played for PBA teams Air21 Express and Kia Carnival. (Poro)
- Kris Porter - a professional basketball player for the GenSan Warriors of the Maharlika Pilipinas Basketball League (MPBL). He was also a former player of Ateneo Blue Eagles and PBA. (Cebu City)
- J. R. Quiñahan – professional basketball player for the Valenzuela Classic of the Maharlika Pilipinas Basketball League (MPBL). (Cebu City)
- Cristobal Ramas - professional basketball player. He competed in the 1960 Summer Olympics. (Cebu City)
- Aldrech Ramos - professional basketball player for the Terrafirma Dyip of the Philippine Basketball Association (PBA). He was part of the FEU Tamaraws team who played back to back finals in seasons 73 and 74 against the Ateneo Blue Eagles. (Cebu City)
- Neil Rañeses - professional basketball player. He previously played in the Philippine Basketball Association with the Coca-Cola Tigers. (Cebu City)
- Biboy Ravanes - professional basketball player and former head coach of the San Miguel Beermen in the Philippine Basketball Association (PBA). (Cebu City)
- Terrence Romeo - professional basketball player who last played for the Terrafirma Dyip of the Philippine Basketball Association (PBA). He plays both the point guard and shooting guard positions. (Boljoon)
- Leonard Santillan - a professional basketball player for the Rain or Shine Elasto Painters of the Philippine Basketball Association (PBA). (Lapu-lapu City)
- Greg Slaughter - professional basketball player for the Manila Batang Sampaloc of the MPBL. He was selected first overall by the Barangay Ginebra San Miguel in the 2013 PBA draft. Sports commentators and scribes call him GregZilla because of his apparent heft and height. (Cebu City)
- Dale Singson - professional basketball player. He last played for the Powerade Tigers in the Philippine Basketball Association. He plays the point guard and shooting guard positions. (Cebu City)
- Mac Tallo - professional basketball player for the Davao Occidental Tigers of the Maharlika Pilipinas Basketball League (MPBL). He is a former TNT KaTropa and NLEX Road Warriors player for Philippine Basketball Association (PBA). (Cebu City)
- Carl Tamayo - professional basketball player for the Changwon LG Sakers of the Korean Basketball League (KBL). He played college basketball for the UP Fighting Maroons of the University Athletic Association of the Philippines (UAAP).(Talisay City)
- Jojo Tangkay - professional basketball player. He was drafted 16th overall by the Sta. Lucia Realtors in the 2001 PBA draft. (Aloguinsan)
- Caelan Tiongson - a professional basketball player for the Rain or Shine Elasto Painters of the Philippine Basketball Association (PBA). Cebu City
- Jimwell Torion - professional basketball player in the Philippine Basketball Association from 2000 to 2007. He is a former Red Bull Barako and Sta. Lucia Realtors. (Cebu City)
- Arnie Tuadles - professional basketball player in the Philippine Basketball Association (PBA). In 1979 he is awarded as PBA Rookie of the Year. (Argao)
- Junthy Valenzuela - basketball player in the Philippine Basketball Association (PBA), a former Red Bull Barako and Barangay Ginebra Kings player. (Bogo City)
- Francisco Vestil - professional basketball player who competed in the 1948 Summer Olympics. Vestil was the flag bearer of the Philippine delegation at the1948 Summer Olympics. (Cebu City)
- Kelly Williams - professional basketball player for the TNT Tropang Giga in the Philippine Basketball Association (PBA). and he also represented the Philippines in international competitions. (Cebu City)
- Roger Yap - professional basketball player. He last played for the Manila Stars of the Maharlika Pilipinas Basketball League (MPBL). (Cebu City)
- Warren Ybañez - professional basketball player who last played for the Marikina Shoemasters of the Maharlika Pilipinas Basketball League (MPBL). He is also a former Philippine Basketball Association (PBA) player. (Cebu City)
- Roberto Yburan - professional basketball player who competed in the 1960 Summer Olympics. (Cebu City)

=== Volleyball ===
- Vange Alinsug - a professional volleyball player. She is currently playing with NU Lady Bulldogs in the UAAP. She is also one of the official lineups of Alas Pilipinas. (Catmon)
- Zenaida Ybañez-Chavez - professional volleyball player who played for the Philippines women's national volleyball team and current coach at the Philippine Super Liga. (Cebu City)
- Joy Dacoron - a professional volleyball player who last played for the Petro Gazz Angels of the Premier Volleyball League (PVL). She played as middle blocker for the Adamson Lady Falcons in the University Athletic Association of the Philippines (UAAP). (Balamban)
- Cyd Demecillo - professional volleyball player. She played with Meralco Power Spikers in the 2015 Philippine Super Liga Grand Prix Conference and with F2 Logistics Cargo Movers for the 2016 Philippine Super Liga All-Filipino Conference helping that club to win their first Superliga championship. (Cebu City)
- Casiey Dongallo - professional volleyball player. She is currently playing for the UE Lady Red Warriors in the University Athletic Association of the Philippines (UAAP). (Catmon)
- Justine Dorog - professional volleyball player. She currently serves as assistant coach for the Farm Fresh Foxies volleyball team in the Premier Volleyball League. (Catmon)
- Thea Gagate - professional volleyball player. She is currently playing as a middle blocker for the Zus Coffee Thunderbelles in the Premier Volleyball League (PVL). (Cebu City)
- Barbie Jamili - is a professional volleyball player for the Creamline Cool Smashers of the Premier Volleyball League (PVL). In college, she played for the Adamson Lady Falcons of the University Athletic Association of the Philippines (UAAP). (Liloan)
- Isa Molde - professional volleyball player. She currently playing for the Choco Mucho Flying Titans in the Premier Volleyball League (PVL). (Catmon)
- Thelma Barina-Rojas - professional volleyball player. She played for the Philippines women's national volleyball team at the Southeast Asian Games from 1981 to 1993. (Cebu City)
- Sisi Rondina - professional indoor and beach volleyball player. She is currently playing for the Choco Mucho Flying Titans at the Premier Volleyball League. (Compostela)
- Grethcel Soltones - professional volleyball player. She is playing for the Akari Chargers in the Premier Volleyball League (PVL). (Catmon)
- Lorene Toring - professional volleyball player. She played for the Adamson Soaring Lady Falcons in the UAAP. (Cebu City)
- Deanna Wong - professional volleyball athlete. member of the Ateneo de Manila University Lady Blue Eagles and Choco Mucho Flying Titans. She won the Best Setter Award during Season 80 of the University Athletic Association of the Philippines (UAAP) in 2018. (Minglanilla)
- Niña Ytang - is a professional volleyball player. She is currently playing for the UP Fighting Maroons in the UAAP. She was part of the Philippines women's national volleyball team that played in the 2023 Asian Women's Volleyball Championship, 2023 SEA Women's V.League – First Leg and 2023 SEA Women's V.League – Second Leg. (Bantayan)

=== Football ===
- Kamil Amirul - a footballer who plays as a defender for Malaysia Super League club Penang and the Philippines under-23 national team. (Cebu City)
- Kenry Balobo - footballer who played as a goalkeeper for Philippines Football League club Kaya–Iloilo. (Cebu City)
- Jerry Barbaso - footballer who plays as a defender for Philippines Football League club Maharlika Manila and the Philippines national football team. (Cebu City)
- Angela Beard - a professional footballer who plays as a defender for A-League Women club Brisbane Roar. She plays for the Philippines national team. (Cebu City)
- Charlie Beaton - professional footballer who plays as a midfielder for Loyola F.C of the Philippines Football League and a former Philippine U23 National Team player. (Cebu City)
- Louie Casas - former footballer who last played as a goalkeeper for Kaya–Iloilo in the Philippines Football League. He was a member of the Philippines national football team being part of the squad in the 2004 AFF Championship. (Danao City)
- Oliver Colina - professional football coach. He is currently the assistant coach of Philippines Football League club Kaya-Iloilo. (Cebu City)
- Victor Cui - a president and CEO of Edmonton Elks are a professional Canadian football team based in Edmonton, Alberta. (Cebu City)
- Dean Ebarle - professional footballer who plays as a full-back for Philippines Football League club Manila Digger. (Cebu City)
- Chad Gould - former footballer who played as a central defender or striker for the Loyola Meralco Sparks and the Philippines national football team. (Cebu City)
- Leigh Gunn - an Australian-Filipino footballer who plays as a forward for Fraser Park FC. He has also represented the Philippines at international level. (Liloan)
- Jordan Jarvis - a professional footballer who plays as a centre back for Philippines Football League club Manila Digger F.C.. (Cebu City)
- Ray Jónsson - former footballer and current head coach of 3. deild karla club Reynir Sandgerði. He previously played for Úrvalsdeild karla club Keflavík. (Liloan)
- Quincy Kammeraad - a professional footballer who plays as a goalkeeper for Malaysia Super League club Kuala Lumpur City. He plays for the Philippines national team. (Cebu City)
- Bjørn Martin Kristensen - a professional footballer who plays as a forward or a winger for Eliteserien club KFUM. He represents the Philippines national team. (Cebu City)
- Jerry Lucena - a former footballer and currently the manager of the U19 squad of Esbjerg fB. He has represented the Philippines national football team at international level, having previously featured in the Denmark U-21 and Denmark League XI international teams. (Cebu City)
- Angelo Marasigan - professional footballer who play as a midfielder for Philippines Football League club Stallion Laguna. (Cebu City)
- Kintaro Miyagi - a professional footballer who plays as a forward for Philippines Football League club Maharlika. He has played for the Philippines national football team. (Lapu-lapu City)
- Lance Ocampo - Filipino footballer who played as a midfielder for the Nagoya University of Commerce & Business. (Cebu City)
- Ivan Ouano - professional footballer who plays as a forward for Philippines Football League club United City F.C. (Cebu City)
- Paolo Pascual - is a former footballer who played as a goalkeeper. He was part of the Philippines national football team. (Cebu City)
- Javier Patiño - professional footballer who played as a striker. He represented the Philippines national team from 2013 to 2019. He began his career in the Divisiones Regionales and moved up to the Tercera División and Segunda División. He then played in the Chinese Super League and Thai League 1, notably with Buriram United where he won several accolades. (Dumanjug)
- Charley Pettys - a former professional footballer who last played as a defender for Global F.C.. He represented the Philippines national football team in one senior international match. (Cebu City)
- Victoria Pickett - a professional football player who plays as a midfielder for AFC Toronto in the Northern Super League. She has also played for the Canada national team. (Cebu City)
- Glenn Ramos - a football coach who is the head coach of Philippines Football League club Dynamic Herb Cebu. (Cebu City)
- Mallie Ramirez - a Filipino footballer who plays as a forward for the Philippines women's national football team. (Cebu City)
- Patrick Reichelt - a professional footballer who plays as a winger or forward for Philippines Football League club One Taguig. (Argao)
- Santiago Rublico - a professional footballer who plays as a right-back or right winger for Tercera Federación team Alcorcón B. He plays for the Philippines national team. (Cebu City)

=== Martial arts ===
- Hyder Amil - Filipino and American mixed martial artist. He currently competes in the Featherweight division of the Ultimate Fighting Championship (UFC). (Cebu City)
- Jose Caballero - the founder of a Filipino martial art called De Campo Uno-Dos-Tres Orihinal. He is considered the Juego Todo champion of his era. (Toledo City)
- Ciriaco Cañete - a Filipino martial artist of the Doce Pares Eskrima Club. In 1951 he developed a personal system of his named Eskrido. (San Fernando)
- Jeff Cobb - a professional wrestler. He is best known for his tenures in Lucha Underground as the luchador enmascarado (masked wrestler) Matanza Cueto, New Japan Pro-Wrestling (NJPW) under his real name, stylized as ジェフ・コブ (Jefu Kobu), and WWE as JC Mateo. (Cebu City)
- James De Los Santos - a Filipino karate practitioner who competes in kata events. He has competed in the Asian Games and the Southeast Asian Games. (Cebu City)
- Antonio Ilustrisimo - the Grandmaster of Kalis Ilustrisimo (KI). (Bantayan)
- Beatriz Lucero Lhuillier - former athlete and Olympian. She won a bronze medal at the 1992 Olympics in taekwondo, a demonstration sports at the Games. (Cebu City)
- Gisele Shaw - a professional wrestler. She is known for her work in England with various promotions including Progress Wrestling and Revolution Pro Wrestling, having held the Women's Championship in both promotions. (Toledo City)
- Ronil Tubog - a professional freestyle wrestler. He is a SEA Games gold and silver medalist. (Cebu City)
- Sonny Umpad - a professional eskrimador. He created Visayan Style Corto Kadena (VSCK) Larga Mano Eskrima in the late 1970s. (Bogo City)
- Kiyomi Watanabe - a Filipino judoka who has represented the Philippines in international competitions including the 2020 Summer Olympics and the 2024 Summer Olympics. (Cebu City)

=== Chess ===
- Glicerio Badilles - chess player and nicknamed as "Chess Lion of Cebu" . He is Chess Olympiad individual gold medalist in 1968. (Cebu City)
- Richard Bitoon - a Chess Grandmaster of Philippines. He was the International Master in the year 2003. FIDE awarded him chess Grandmaster title in 2011. (Cebu City)
- Nelson Mariano - a professional chess player. He was awarded the title of Grandmaster by FIDE in 2004, the fifth from the Philippines. He won the Asian Junior Chess Championship in 1994. (Cebu City)
- Rico Mascariñas - is a professional chess player with the title of International Master. He was one of the premiere chess players of the Philippines during the 1980s and the 1990s and for a long period of time he was the No. 2 ranked player of the Philippines. (Cebu City)
- Joseph Sánchez - a chess Grandmaster. Becoming the first Cebuano chess grandmaster and the 11th Filipino chess grandmaster. (Cebu City)
- Enrico Sevillano - a chess player who received the FIDE title of Grandmaster (GM) in September 2012. (Cebu City)
- Kim Steven Yap - a professional chess player. He holds the FIDE title of International Master (IM). (Cebu City)

=== Swimming ===
- Jasmine Alkhaldi - a swimmer who represented the Philippines in the 2012 Summer Olympics and 2016 Summer Olympics. (Cebu City)
- Ulpiano Babol - a professional swimmer. He competed in two events at the 1956 Summer Olympics. (Cebu City)
- James Deiparine - a professional swimmer. He competed in the men's 50 metre breaststroke event at the 2017 World Aquatics Championships. (Cebu City)
- Nicole Oliva - is a professional swimmer. She competed in the women's 200 metre freestyle event at the 2017 World Aquatics Championships. and the at women's 400 metre freestyle the 2019 edition of the same tournament. (Cebu City)

=== Cycling ===
- Jonel Carcueva - a professional cyclist who rides for UCI Continental team Go for Gold Philippines, of which he has been part of since 2017. (Minglanilla)
- Niño Surban - a professional mountain bike and road cyclist. He is a Southeast Asian Games gold medalist. (Cebu City)

=== Track and field ===
- Visitacion Badana - a long jump athlete. She competed in the women's long jump at the 1960 Summer Olympics and 1958 Asian Games gold medalist in long jump. (Cebu City)
- Jessica Barnard - former steeplechase and middle-distance runner. She is a Southeast Asian Games medalist. (Cebu City)
- Trenten Beram - a former track and field athlete who competed in sprinting events. He participated at the 29th Southeast Asian Games 2017 in Malaysia, he won 2 gold medals in the 200 and 400 meter dash, he also won bronze medal in the 4 × 100 relay. (Mandaue City)
- Josephine de la Viña - a discus thrower who won gold medals in her pet event at the 1966 Asian Games and 1973 Asian Athletics Championships. She also competed at the 1964, 1968 and 1972 Olympics. (Cebu City)
- Leonardo Illut - a long-distance runner. He competed in the marathon at the 1984 Summer Olympics. (Cebu City)
- Mary Joy Tabal - a marathon runner. She is the first female Filipino marathon runner to qualify for the Olympics. She placed 124th at the 2016 Summer Olympics. (Cebu City)
- Natalie Uy - a professional track and field athlete specializing in pole vaulting. She is a Southeast Asian Games gold medalist. (Cebu City)
- Roy Vence - a professional long-distance runner athlete. He competed in the men's marathon at the 1996 Summer Olympics. (Bogo City)
- Regino Ylanan - a professional track and field athlete. He rose to fame with three gold medals in 1913 and one gold medal in 1915 Far Eastern Championship Games in shot put, discus throw, and pentathlon games. (Bogo City)

=== Weightlifting ===
- Elreen Ando - a weightlifter who competed at 2020 Summer Olympics in Tokyo and 2024 Summer Olympics in Paris. She is also 2023 SEA Games gold medalist. (Cebu City)
- John Ceniza - a weightlifter who represented the Philippines at the 2024 Summer Olympics in Paris. He is 2019 SEA Games and 2023 SEA Games silver medalist. (Cebu City)
- Ramón Solis - a weightlifter who represented the Philippines internationally from 1975 to 1998. He won gold medals in 1981, 1983, 1985, 1987, 1989 and 1991 in the Southeast Asian Games. He competed in the men's middle heavyweight event at the 1988 Summer Olympics. (Cebu City)

=== Baseball ===
- Filomeno Codiñera - a former baseball player. He has represented the men's national baseball team of the Philippines as a third baseman. (Cebu City)
- Tim Lincecum - nicknamed "the Freak", is a former professional baseball pitcher who played ten seasons in Major League Baseball (MLB), primarily for the San Francisco Giants. A two-time Cy Young Award winner, Lincecum won World Series championships in 2010, 2012, and 2014 as a member of the Giants. (Carcar City)
- Arlie Pond - an American Major League Baseball pitcher for the Baltimore Orioles from 1895 to 1898. (Cebu City)
- Regino Ylanan - baseball player and athletics. He rose to fame with three gold medals in track and field at the 1913 Far Eastern Championship Games. He won two further medals at the 1915 Far Eastern Championship Games and also represented his country in baseball at three editions of the tournament. (Bogo City)

=== Softball ===
- Filomeno Codiñera - a former softball player. He has represented the men's national softball of the Philippines as an outfielder. (Cebu City)
- Leticia Gempisao - a softball player who played as a catcher. She was part of the Philippines women's national softball team which placed third in the 1970 Women's Softball World Championship in Osaka, Japan. (Sibonga)

=== Billiard ===
- Rubilen Amit - a female professional pool player. She is a two-time WPA Women's World Ten-ball champion and the first Filipina pool player to become WPA Women's World Nine-ball champion in 2024. (Mandaue City)
- Warren Kiamco - a professional pool player. He is known for his performances in the Southeast Asian Games and Asian Games. (Cebu City)
- Anton Raga - a professional pool player nicknamed "The Dragon". Raga reached the final of the 2023 European Open Pool Championship, however, would lose on hill-hill 13–12 to David Alcaide of Spain. (Cebu City)

=== Skateboarding ===
- Margielyn Didal - a professional street skateboarder who rose to fame when she competed in the X Games Minneapolis 2018 and won a gold medal in the 2018 Asian Games. (Cebu City)

=== Shooting sport ===
- Simon Racaza - a sport shooter who took silver in the Open division at the 2011 IPSC Handgun World Shoot and silver in the Production division at the 2014 Handgun World Shoot. He was also the number one qualifier of the US Gold Team for the 2010 ISSF World Shooting Championships. (Cebu City)

=== Gymnastics ===
- Allen Aldrin Castañeda - an Olympic gymnastics coach who coached two-time Olympic gold medalist Carlos Yulo. (Cebu City)
- Jake Jarman - a professional artistic gymnast and competes internationally for Great Britain and England. Representing Great Britain, he is the 2023 World Champion on vault, the 2025 World Champion on floor, the 2024 Olympic floor exercise bronze medalist, and is a four-time European Champion. (Malabuyoc)

=== Bowling ===
- Lita dela Rosa - a 4-time World champion in Tenpin Bowling. She was posthumously inducted in the World Bowling Hall of Fame and in the Philippine Sports Hall of Fame in 2018. (Cebu City)

=== Golf ===
- Ben Arda - a professional golfer who was the first Filipino to qualify for the Masters Tournament and The Open Championship. He won nine tournaments on the Asia Golf Circuit, including the Philippine Open three times, and headed the points list in 1970. He also won four times on the Japan Golf Tour and played in the World Cup 16 times, recording a best finish of 2nd place in 1977. (Cebu City)

=== Tennis ===
- Eryn Cayetano (born 2001) - a professional tennis player. She has career-high rankings of No. 396 in singles, achieved on August 11, 2025, and of No. 312 in doubles, achieved on August 11, 2025. She played collegiate tennis at the University of Southern California. (Cebu City)

=== Table Tennis ===
- Richard Gonzales - is a professional table tennis player and the No. 1 ranked player in the Philippines as of January 2014. (Cebu City)

=== Sailing ===
- Mario Almario - a professional sailor. He competed at the 1972 Summer Olympics in Kiel. He took 26th place in the Soling with his fellow crew members. He also competed at the 1976 Summer Olympics in Kingston, Ontario where he took 28th place in the Finn. His last Olympic appearance was during the 1992 Summer Olympics in Barcelona in the Soling with his fellow crew members their team took the 24th place. (Cebu City)

=== Darts ===
- Rowby-John Rodriguez - is a professional darts player who competes in Professional Darts Corporation (PDC) events. He was runner-up at the PDC World Cup of Darts in both 2021 and 2024, partnering Mensur Suljović for Austria. (Cebu City)

=== Archery ===
- Luis Gabriel Moreno - an archer later actor who competed for the Philippines at the 2014 Summer Youth Olympics. (Bogo City)

=== Poker ===
- Noli Francisco - a professional poker player, nicknamed Smiling Assassin. He had been a successful recreational poker player for over 25 years. (Cebu City)

== Business and industry ==
- Jon Ramon Aboitiz - businessman, and president of the Aboitiz & Company Inc. (ACO) and Aboitiz Equity Ventures (AEV), part of the Aboitiz Group. (Cebu City)
- Eugene Acevedo - A business executive. He is the president and chief executive officer of Rizal Commercial Banking Corporation (RCBC). (Cebu City)
- Vicki Belo - aesthetic dermatologist, media personality, entrepreneur, and philanthropist. She is the founder, chairwoman of the board, and founding medical advisor of Belo Medical Group. (Cebu City)
- Benito S. Gaisano - founder of Gaisano Grand Malls is a chain of shopping malls under the Philippine-based Gaisano Grand Group of Companies. (Cebu City)
- Edmund S. Gaisano, Sr. - founder of Gaisano Capital a chain of malls and supermarkets. This supermarket became the first Gaisano Capital supermarket and is presently known as Gaisano Capital South. (Cebu City)
- Victor Gaisano - founder of Metro Retail Stores Group a retail company. Metro is the largest operator of department stores and hypermarkets in the Visayas region, as well as the second largest supermarket operator according to retail sales value. (Cebu City)
- Julie Gandionco - founder of Julie's Bakeshop a chain of neighborhood bakeries in the Philippines. It has grown to become the largest bakery chain in the country by store count, with over 600 locations. (Cebu City)
- John Gokongwei - Filipino, Cebuano billionaire businessman and philanthropist. He is the founder of Universal Robina. (Cebu City)
- Lance Gokongwei - a Filipino businessman. He is the president and CEO of JG Summit Holdings, Inc. since 2018. He is the only son of businessman John Gokongwei He and his siblings are listed among the richest in the country. (Cebu City)
- Robina Gokongwei - Filipino businesswoman, investor, philanthropist. She is currently chairman of Robinsons Retail. She is also a director of JG Summit Holdings, Robinsons Land, and Cebu Pacific. (Cebu City)
- Andrew Gotianun - Businessman and investor. He is the founder of Filinvest and EastWest Bank. (Cebu City)
- Go Teng Kok - a Filipino sports executive and businessman who was president of the Philippine Athletics Track and Field Association (PATAFA) from 1990 to 2014. (Cebu City)
- Jean Henri Lhuillier - A businessman, diplomat and sports patron. The current president and CEO of Cebuana Lhuillier. (Cebu City)
- Michael Lhuillier - Cebuano Businessman known as the country's ‘Pawnshop King’ (M Lhuillier Group of Companies Founder and Chairman, Cebu Provincial Sports Commission Chairman, Honorary consul of France in Cebu and Cebu Safari and Adventure Park Founder). (Cebu City)
- Philippe Lhuillier - A diplomat, businessman and philanthropist. He is the chairman of the Philippine's largest pawnshop chain, Cebuana Lhuillier. (Cebu City)
- Bernie Liu - Chair and CEO of Penshoppe a casual wear retail brand and OXGN a fashion brand. (Cebu City)
- Bong Tan - Filipino business executive and basketball coach. He was appointed as president of the PAL Holdings Inc., he was also director and president of Tanduay Distillers Inc. and Eton Properties Philippines Inc. and director and vice president of Fortune Tobacco Corp. (Cebu City)
- Lucio Tan - Filipino billionaire businessman and philanthropist. He is the chairman and CEO of LT Group, Inc., Philippine Airlines, MacroAsia Corporation. (Cebu City)
- Justin Uy - Cebuano Entrepreneur (Owner of Jpark Island Resort & Waterpark, Founder of J Centre Mall and Founder of Profood International Corp.). (Cebu City)
- Wilfred Steven Uytengsu - Filipino businessman and President of Alaska Milk Corporation. (Cebu City)
- Eddie Woolbright - an American entrepreneur who planned and developed the Beverly Hills subdivision of Lahug, Cebu City. (Cebu City)

== Science ==
=== Agricultural science ===
- Romulo Davide - an agricultural scientist hailed as the “Father of Plant Nematology" is a philanthropist and leader for the poor farmers of the Philippines and a recipient of the renowned Ramon Magsaysay Award in 2012. He is a National Scientist of the Philippines in 2024 in the field of Plant Pathology and Nematology. (Argao)

=== Astronomy ===
- Casimiro del Rosario - a Filipino scientist. He was named a National Scientist of the Philippines in 1983 for being a pioneer in physics, meteorology, and astronomy in the Philippines. (Bantayan)
- Roman Kintanar - a scientist in the field of meteorology. An asteroid (6636 Kintanar) was named after him in 2007 for his contributions to the science of meteorology. In 1995, he is awarded an International Meteorological Organization Prize by the World Meteorological Organization (WMO). (Cebu City)

=== Biology and Environmental Science ===
- Dioscoro S. Rabor - also known as Joe Rabor. An ornithologist, zoologist, and conservationist. Known as the "Father of Philippine Wildlife Conservation", he led more than 50 wildlife expeditions in the Philippines, authored 87 scientific papers and articles, and described 69 new bird taxa and numerous mammal species. (Cebu City)
- Anna Oposa - is a marine conservationist and co-founder of NGO Save Philippine Seas (SPS), an organization that aims to protect coastal and marine environments through education and community-based projects. She helped create the first shark sanctuary in the Philippines and helped designate the thresher shark as a nationally protected species. In 2023, Oposa became a laureate of Asian Scientist 100 by the Asian Scientist. (Cebu City)

=== Health science ===
- Herbert Gaisano - a Filipino-Canadian physician-scientist, gastroenterologist, and cell biologist known for his research on diabetes and pancreatic diseases. He is a professor in the Departments of Medicine and Physiology at the University of Toronto and a senior scientist at the Toronto General Hospital Research Institute and the Krembil Research Institute. (Cebu City)

== Military service ==
=== Philippine Army ===
- Crisologo Abines - former First Lieutenant in the Philippine Army assigned in the Logistics Service, Visayas Command. (Oslob)
- Roy Kyamko - was head of the Armed Forces of the Philippines Southern Command (Southcom) during operations against the Abu Sayyaf Group in 2004. (Cebu City)
- Manuel F. Segura - was a colonel of the Armed Forces of the Philippines. (Cebu City)
- Andres Centino - a retired Philippine Army general who currently serves as Presidential Assistant on Maritime Concerns to President Bongbong Marcos since September 2023. (Cebu City)

=== Philippine Air Force ===
- Rozzano D. Briguez - a general who formerly served as the Commanding General of the Philippine Air Force. He was also a commander of the AFP Western Command, and formulated a new command framework: "Padayon PAF: Perform, Reform, Transform", a framework of his leadership philosophy in the Philippine Air Force. (Cebu City)

=== Philippine Constabulary ===
- Ramon Montaño - A politician and military officer. Chief of the Philippine Constabulary-Integrated National Police from 1988 to 1990. (Cebu City)
- Cesar Nazareno - Retired police officer who served as the inaugural Chief of the Philippine National Police (1991-1992). Former Chief of the Philippine Constabulary (1990-1991). (Talisay City)

== Pageant titleholders ==
Pageant titleholders who won a national pageant title and subsequently competed in, placed in, or won an international pageant.

They are categorized according to the specific international pageant in which they competed.

=== Women's pageant titleholders ===
==== Manila Carnival Queen ====
- Enriqueta de Vega Aldanese - Manila Carnival Queen 1918. (Sibonga)
- Amparo Benitez Noel - Manila Carnival Queen 1912 - Reina de Visayas. (Carcar City)
- Lourdes Rodriguez - Manila Carnival Queen 1927 - Miss Visayas. (Cebu City)

==== Miss Universe ====
- Mary Ann Carmen Corrales - Miss Philippines Universe 1957. (Cebu City)
- Pilar Pilapil – Binibining Pilipinas Universe 1967. (Liloan)
- Jennifer Cortez - Binibining Pilipinas Universe 1978. (Mandaue City)
- Gazini Ganados – Binibining Pilipinas Universe 2019, Miss Universe 2019 top 20 finalist and MGI All Stars 1st Edition top 5 semifinalist. (Talisay City)
- Beatrice Luigi Gomez – Miss Universe Philippines 2021 and Miss Universe 2021 top 5 finalist. (San Fernando)

==== Miss World ====
- Ruffa Gutierrez - Binibining Pilipinas World 1993 and Miss World 1993 2nd runner-up. (Cebu City)
- Maria Karla Bautista - Binibining Pilipinas World 2004 and Miss World 2004 top 5 finalist and Miss World Asia and Oceania. (Cebu City)
- Arielle Diane Garciano - Miss World New Zealand 2014. (Poro)
- Tracy Maureen Perez – Miss World Philippines 2021 and Miss World 2021 top 12 semifinalist. (Cordova)

==== Miss International ====
- Yedda Marie Mendoza Kittilsvedt – Binibining Pilipinas International 1996 and Miss International 1996 top 15 semifinalist. (Cebu City)
- Nicole Schmitz – Binibining Pilipinas International 2012 and Miss International 2012 top 12 semifinalist. (Cebu City)
- Nicole Borromeo – Binibining Pilipinas International 2022 and Miss International 2023 3rd Runner Up. (Cebu City)

==== Miss Earth ====
- Karla Paula Henry – Miss Earth 2008. (Cebu City)
- Jamie Herrell – Miss Earth 2014. (Cebu City)

==== Miss Grand International ====
- Elizabeth Clenci - Binibining Pilipinas Grand International 2017 and Miss Grand International 2017 2nd runner-up. (Mandaue City)
- Eva Psyche Patalinjug - Binibining Pilipinas Grand International 2018. (Cebu City)
- Samantha Ashley Lo - Binibining Pilipinas Grand International 2019. (Cebu City)

==== Miss Supranational ====
- Rogelie Catacutan – Binibining Pilipinas Supranational 2015 and Miss Supranational 2015 top 20 semifinalist. (Cebu City)
- Rovelyn Milford - Miss Supranational New Zealand 2025 and Miss Intercontinental New Zealand 2022. (San Fernando)

==== Miss Intercontinental ====
- Kris Tiffany Janson - Binibining Pilipinas Intercontinental 2014 and Miss Intercontinental 2014 2nd runner-up. (Cebu City)
- Jacqueline Schubert - Miss Intercontinental Philippines 2009. (Borbon)

==== Miss Charm ====
- Kayla Jean Carter - Miss Charm Philippines 2024 and Miss Charm 2024 Top 20 semifinalist. (Talisay City)
- Apriel Smith - Miss Charm Philippines 2026. (Cebu City)

==== Miss Eco International ====
- Thia Thomalla - Miss Eco International 2018. (Cebu City)
- Chantal Schmidt - Miss Eco Philippines 2024 and Miss Eco International 2024 1st runner-up. (Cebu City)
- Gabbi Carballo - Miss Eco Philippines 2026 and Miss Eco International 2026 top 21 semifinalist. (Cebu City)
- Adriana Gravador - Miss Eco Australia 2026 and Miss Eco International 2026 2nd runner up. (Cebu City)

==== Reina Hispanoamericana ====
- Emmanuelle Vera - Reina Hispanoamericana Filipinas 2021 and Reina Hispanoamericana 2021 3rd runner-up. (Cebu City)

==== Universal Woman ====
- Maria Gigante - Universal Woman 2024. (Bantayan)

==== Miss Tourism International ====
- Rizzini Alexis Gomez - Miss Tourism International 2012. (Cordova)
- Angeli Dione Gomez - Miss Tourism International 2013. (Cebu City)

==== Miss Asia Pacific International ====
- Yvette Marie Alfon - Mutya ng Pilipinas 1972 and Miss Asia Pacific International 1972 1st runner up. (Cebu City)
- Ilene de Vera - Mutya ng Pilipinas 2017 and Miss Asia Pacific International 2017 4th runner up. (Mandaue City)
- Mercedes Pair - Miss Asia Pacific Hong Kong 2024 and Miss Asia Pacific International 2024 Top 21 semifinalist. (Lapu-Lapu City)

=== Transwomen's pageant titleholders ===
==== Miss International Queen ====
- Fuschia Anne Ravena – Miss International Queen 2022 and MGI All Stars 1st Edition top 18 semifinalist. (Bogo City)
- Stacy Biano - Miss International Queen 2016 Top 10 semifinalist and awarded as Miss Photogenic. (Mandaue City)

=== Men's pageant titleholders ===
==== Mister International ====
- Gil Wagas - Mister International Philippines 2013 and Mister International 2013 3rd runner up. (Lapu-Lapu City)

==== Mister Supranational ====
- Yves Campos - Mister Supranational Philippines 2017 and Mister Supranational 2017 top 20 semifinalist. (Talisay City)
- RaÉd Al-Źghayer - Mister Supranational Philippines 2022 and Mister Supranational 2022 top 20 semifinalist. (Cebu City)

==== Mister Global ====
- John Ernest Tanting - Mister Global Philippines 2023 and Mister Global 2023 top 15 semifinalist. (Cebu City)

==== Man of the World ====
- John Paul Ocat - Man of the World Philippines 2019 and Man of the World 2019 4th runner up. (Talisay City)
- RaÉd Al-Źghayer - Man of the World Philippines 2025 and Man of the World 2025 top 10 semifinalist. (Cebu City)
- Kendrick Abarquez - Man of the World Philippines 2027. (Talisay City)

== Religious figure ==
=== Saint ===
- Pedro Calungsod - a young Filipino Catholic Saint, sacristan, a missionary catechist, and a martyr who was canonized in 2012 by Pope Benedict XVI. (Ginatilan)

=== Venerable ===
- Teofilo Camomot - an archbishop. He is recognized by the Catholic Church as a Venerable for his heroic virtues, holy life, and selfless service to God and the poor. (Carcar City)

=== Cardinal ===
- Ricardo Vidal - a prelate of the Catholic Church. He was made a cardinal in 1985. He was Archbishop of Cebu from 1982 to 2010. (Originally from Mogpog, Marinduque)

=== Archbishop ===
- José María Cuenco - a prelate of the Catholic Church and was the first archbishop of the Archdiocese of Jaro in Iloilo, Philippines. (Carmen)
- Jesus Dosado - was a prelate of the Catholic Church, who served as the Bishop and then Archbishop of Ozamiz from 1981 until his retirement in 2016. (Sogod)
- John F. Du - a prelate of Catholic Church. He is the Archbishop of Palo in Leyte, Philippines. (Bantayan)
- Martin Jumoad - a prelate of the Catholic Church. He is the Metropolitan Archbishop of Ozamis in Ozamiz, Misamis Occidental, Philippines. (Cebu City)
- Francisco Montecillo Padilla - a prelate of the Catholic Church and an archbishop who has worked in the diplomatic service of the Holy See since 1985. He is the present Apostolic Nuncio of Guatemala. (Cebu City)
- Osvaldo Padilla - a prelate of the Catholic Church who spent his career in the diplomatic service of the Holy See. He became an archbishop in 1991 and the position of Apostolic Nuncio to several countries before retiring in 2017. (Sogod)
- José S. Palma - a prelate and a professed member of the Dominican Order who served as Metropolitan Archbishop of Cebu from 2011 to 2025. (Originally from Dingle, Iloilo)

=== Bishop ===
- Isabelo Caiban Abarquez - a bishop of the Roman Catholic Diocese of Calbayog, Philippines. (Dumanjug)
- Narciso Abellana - a Roman Catholic bishop and the current and fifth bishop of the Roman Catholic Diocese of Romblon. (Talisay City)
- Patricio Hacbang Alo - was a bishop. He served as auxiliary bishop of the Archdiocese of Davao, Philippines from 1981 to 1984 and was bishop of the Diocese of Mati from 1984 to 2014. (Cebu City)
- Emilio Bataclan - a prelate of the Catholic Church. He is an auxiliary bishop emeritus of the Latin Church Archdiocese of Cebu. (Bantayan)
- Patricio Buzon - a bishop of the Diocese of Bacolod since 2016. He previously served as the Bishop of Kabankalan from 2003 to 2016. (Cebu City)
- Antonieto Cabajog - a bishop of the Diocese of Surigao since 2001. (Cebu City)
- Precioso Cantillas - a bishop of the Catholic Church who has been serving as the bishop of the Diocese of Maasin since 1998. Prior to this, he was an auxiliary bishop of Cebu from 1995 to 1998. He is a member of the Salesians of Don Bosco. (Naga City)
- Euginius Cañete - a bishop of the Catholic Church who serves as the fourth bishop of the Diocese of Gumaca in Quezon Province, Philippines. (Liloan)
- Juan Gorordo - the first Cebuano appointed bishop and the second appointed bishop in the Philippines. He served as Bishop of Cebu from 1910 until his retirement in 1931. (Barili)
- Ruben Labajo - prelate who previously served as the Auxiliary Bishop of the Archdiocese of Cebu from 2022 to 2025. He is currently—and the first bishop of–the newly erected Diocese of Prosperidad. (Talisay)
- Christian Vicente Noel - a Roman Catholic prelate. He served as the Bishop of Talibon from 1986 until his retirement in 2014. (Asturias)
- Leopoldo Tumulak - was a Bishop of the Military Ordinariate of the Philippines. He served as head of the Military Ordinariate of the Philippines from 2005 until his death in 2017. (Santander)
- Dennis Villarojo - a catholic prelate currently serving as bishop of the Roman Catholic Diocese of Malolos. (Cebu City)

=== Faith healer ===
- Luisa Abano - Popularly known as Nanay Loling, a Catholic laywoman and faith healer. (Talisay City)

=== Religion founder and leader ===
- Toribio Sabandija Quimada - a religious leader and the founder of the Unitarian Universalist Church of the Philippines. (Cebu City)

== Heroes and revolutionaries ==
=== Datu ===
- Lapu-Lapu - considered as the first national hero of the Philippines. He is a Datu of Mactan known for leading the resistance in the 1521 Battle of Mactan. (Mactan Island, Cebu)

=== Katimpuneros ===
- Potenciano Aliño - a revolutionary hero, together with his brothers Felix, Hilario and Sulpicio fought as revolutionaries against the Spanish colonial rule. (Talisay City)
- Leon Kilat - a revolutionary leader in Cebu during the Philippine revolution against the Spanish Empire. (Originally from Bacong, Negros Oriental)
- Arcadio Maxílom - a member of Katipunan and revolutionary leader from Cebu who played a key role in the Philippine Revolution against Spanish rule. He led revolutionary forces in northern Cebu and later continued resistance during the early period of American occupation. (Tuburan)

=== Guerrillas ===
- Democrito Mendoza - he joined the resistance movement against the Japanese and became a guerilla fighter,which earned him distinction as a bemedalled Filipino veteran. The United States Army's America Division awarded him the Gold Cross for his military service as an officer of the US Army Forces in the Far East. (Liloan)
- Miguel Raffiñan - participated in the resistance movement during World War II and led the people of Barili in the fight against the Japanese colonizers. (Barili)
- Leandro Tojong - was part of the resistance movement during World War II and given the rank of captain. His designation was at the 87th Regiment, 3rd Battalion's base hospital in Barili and Dumanjug. Later, he was commissioned as the unit's Assistant Civil Affairs Officer. (Ginatilan)

== Education ==
- Ronald Duterte - president of then University of Southern Philippines Foundation (USPF) in 1991 and later on as dean of its college of law. (Cebu City)
- Nicolas Escario - an educator, physician, politician and legislator. He founded Cebu Institute of Technology. (Bantayan)
- Vicente Gullas - an educator, writer and lawyer. Founder of University of the Visayas. (Cebu City)
- Francisco Nemenzo - a political scientist, educator, and activist who served as the 18th president of the University of the Philippines (UP) from 1999 to 2005. He had previously served as chancellor of UP Visayas, UP Faculty Regent, and dean of the College of Arts & Sciences of UP Diliman. (Cebu City)
- Daniel Franklin Pilario - a contextual theologian, writer, educator, and Vincentian Catholic priest. He currently serves as president of Adamson University. He was a former professor and dean of St. Vincent School of Theology. (Oslob)
- Lourdes Quisumbing - prominent educator and former Secretary of Education of Philippines. (Cebu City)
- Emanuel V. Soriano - An engineer and academic administrator who was the 14th president of the University of the Philippines. (Cebu City)
- Roberto Yap - an economist and Jesuit who currently serves as the 31st president of the Ateneo de Manila University. (Cebu City)

== Notable people with roots from Cebu ==
This section is intended for people who are not born in Cebu but whose grandparents or great-grandparents were born or are associated with Cebu.

- Jose Mari Chan - a singer and songwriter. he is popularly dubbed as the "King of Philippine Christmas Carols". (maternal roots)
- Serena Dalrymple - a famous child star and actress who had been officially retired from show business since 2005. (maternal roots)
- Sara Duterte - a lawyer and politician who is the 15th and current vice president of the Philippines. (maternal and paternal roots)
- Diego Gutierrez - an actor, singer, songwriter and basketball player. (paternal roots)
- Janine Gutierrez - an actress. (paternal roots)
- Francis Magalona - an actor and singer, known as the "Filipino King of Rap". (maternal roots)
- Martin Nievera - a singer and songwriter. Known for his contemporary love ballads and on-stage personality, he is celebrated as one of the most important figures in local Filipino music. (maternal roots)
- Krista Ranillo - an actress. (paternal roots)
- Ciara Sotto - an actress, singer and host. (paternal roots)
- Oyo Boy Sotto - an actor. (paternal roots)
- Gian Sotto - an actor and politician who has served as the 18th vice mayor of Quezon City since 2019. (paternal roots)
- Lala Sotto - a politician and television host who has served as the chairperson of the Movie and Television Review and Classification Board (MTRCB). (paternal roots)
- Miko Sotto - a matinee idol, actor, and teen star. (paternal roots)
- Vico Sotto - a politician serving as the 12th mayor of Pasig since 2019. (paternal roots)

Note: Those People who were not born in Cebu but whose mother or father was born in Cebu are automatically listed in the specific section because they have close Cebuano roots and they are considered Cebuano.
