= Adlawan =

Adlawan is a Filipino surname of Cebuano origin (means "in daylight"). Notable people with the surname include:

- Aloy Adlawan, Filipino film director and screenwriter
- Irma Adlawan (born 1962), Filipino actress
- Temistokles Adlawan, Filipino writer and poet

Fictional

- Homer Adlawan, a character from FPJ's Ang Probinsyano
