= Ruperto Alaura =

Filipino author

Ruperto Alaura Sr. was a Cebuano writer based in Lapu-Lapu City, Philippines. He wrote prose stories and novels and was published in Bisaya Magasin.

He was a LUDABI prize winner in 1961.

== Short stories ==
- Usa ka Hataas nga Gabii (A Long Night), published in Bisaya Magasin in 1961.
- Mga Pugas nga Bulawan (Seeds of Gold), published in Bag-ong Suga.
- Ang Damgo (The Dream), published in Silaw.
- Sukod (Measure), published in Bag-ong Suga.
