= Lázaro Mangubat =

Visayan Filipino conquistador and armiger

Royal coat of arms of Mangubat and the emblem of the Kingdom of Mactan
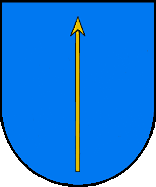
- Armiger: Rajah Mangubat, Emblem of The Kingdom of Mactan, Tercios (Spanish East Indies) territories
- Adopted: 1576

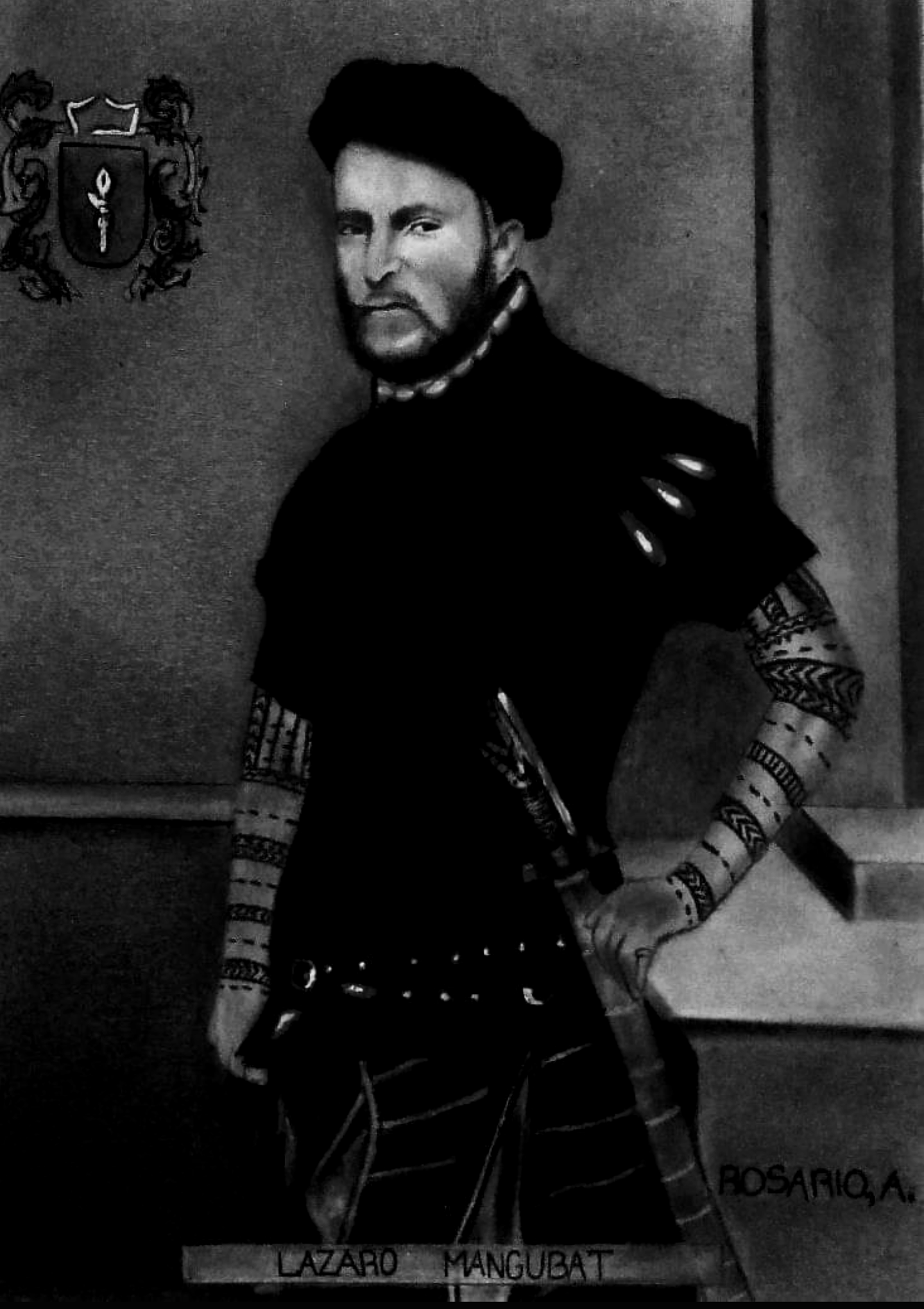
An artist perspective of Lazaro de Mangubat, as a tattooed Filipino Warrior and Conquistador in the service of the Spanish Empire; 17th century Spanish Grande, and monarch of the Kingdom of Mactan with Campilan sword belted at his waist. By: ABIGAIL G. ROSARIO

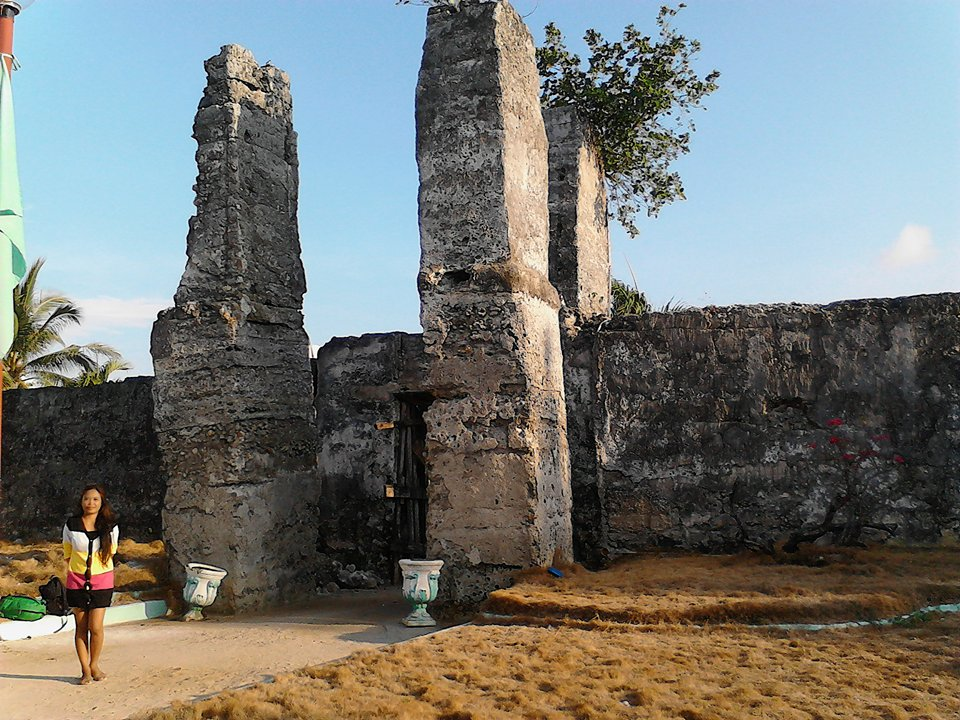
The ruins of Presidio in Cota (Camp) now Kota Park in Madridejos, Cebu established by Lazaro de Mangubat in 1630

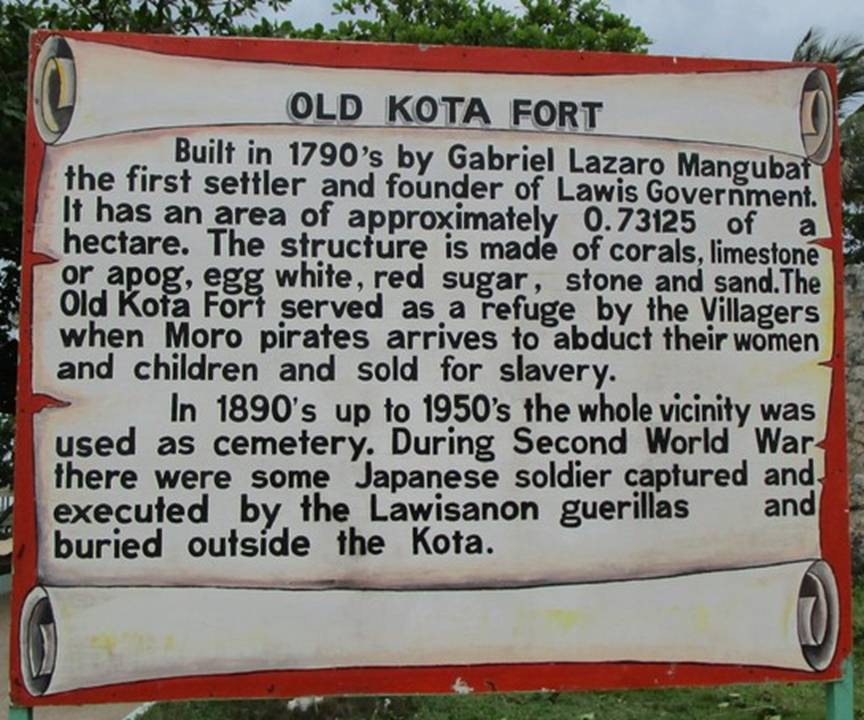
Kota historical marker

Gabriel Lázaro de Mangubat, also known as Loreto Mangubat, was a monarch of the Kingdom of Mactan, a Spanish Duke in the Spanish East Indies, a Tercio and conquistador, and one of the Arm Bearers or armiger in the Spanish Empire from the early 17th century.

According to the Centuries old Oral Tradition of Lawis Madridejos Bantayan Island, He was the builder of the Fort in Lawis, and a grandson of Lapu-lapu.

== History ==
In year 1628 Lázaro the Mangubat( meaning: the raider) established the first organized settlement in Bantayan in the aftermath of Muslim raid on that year.

He built a presidio (fort) in the northernmost part of Bantayan Island where Madridejos formerly Lawis also spelled Lauis or Louis -meaning " Point to the sea" is now located to protect the inhabitants.

It is believed that the construction of the fort (presidio) began in 1628 and continued until around 1635, during the period when the tattooed Visayan warriors—considered the most formidable Spanish infantry unit under the command of Lazaro Mangubat—left the Visayas, including Bantayan Island, to participate in the conquest of Mindanao, Sulu, Borneo, and the Moluccas, with the aim of avenging the deaths of many innocent and unarmed civilians at the hands of Muslim raiders.

In Bantayan, Lazaro the Mangubat regrouped and organized the survivors and formed a government then known as "the Lawis government".

In year 1800s he was commemorated, and proclaimed (by the Spanish Superior Government) as the "founder of Lawis", and founder of all the other settlements that came into existence later on the Island, including the settlements of Suba and Binaobao in central Bantayan Island that later combined to form what is now called the Municipality of Bantayan (formally became a pueblo in 1763), and the settlement of Octong formally became a pueblo in 1872 known as Pueblo de Octon or Gogtong today municipality of Santa Fe (Holy Faith).

Lázaro also built a stone church (the third in Bantayan Island) whose ruined walls and post from the ravages of war and Moro raid can still be seen towering in the northernmost part of the town in the 1960s.

It was also him who proclaimed the place a "VISITA" (this marks the beginnings of a new parish (founded and built in 1800s) in the Municipality of Bantayan.

though in year 1580 there's already a Parochial Church and convent established on the Island but it ceased to exist.

the church, convent and villages were destroyed, people were killed and only few have survived during the Muslim raid in year 1600.

the Northern part of Cebu Island (Daan Bantayan) and Northern part of Bantayan Island (Lawis) were originally used as a "guarding post" or look out Station in year 1574 to monitor the Visayan Sea against perceived Chinese threats led by Limahong who invaded Manila, the location gives a timely warning and preparation for the Spanish City of Cebu located in Fort San Pedro in case of Chinese attack originating from Luzon. thus the island got its name "Bantayan" a Filipino term that means "to guard"

In 1635 Lazaro moved to Mindanao and established a Kota (camp) and a Fuerte (fort) in the Southern part of Mindanao now known as Zamboanga del Sur facing the Island of Basilan, Jolo, and Borneo. It was Fray Melchor de Vera, was appointed designer of the fort.

Although today the construction of the fort Pilar in Zamboanga was attributed by modern historians to Fr. Melchor de Vera, but priests were known to build churches not government fortresses and Cotas(camps) like the Fort Pilar, and they worked separately and independently in the past, and several times in history priest missionaries often comes in conflict with the government during the early period of Spanish colonization according to the accounts of religious missionaries at the time.

The people of Madridejos honoured its founder by naming one of the streets Lazaro Mangubat Street. Lazaro was from Opon before settling in Madridejos, hence, in reverence to his roots, a street in Poblacion (Opon) Lapu-Lapu City, the G (ABRIEL) MANGUBAT Street was named after his memory.

== Time line ==
1574

Bantayan Island was used as Observation Post and Choke point after Daan Bantayan by the Spanish Army to monitor and to safeguard Cebu City leading the place to be known as Bantayan (to Guard)

1574–1580

The church in Bantayan was constructed by the Augustinians

1588

The church built in Bantayan by the Augustinians was abandoned

1600

First moro raid took place destroyed the first stone church (laid down 1574 – consecrated 1580)

1615

Fray Garcia Jacome Served as Spiritual counsellor for the people of bantayan, candaya

1627 Francisco Rodriguez Relator March 2, 1627 Cura Bantayan

1627 Juan Nuñez Crespo March 3, 1627 cura Bantayan

1628 Moro raid took place, destroying the Church (Chapel) standing from 1600–1628 that was made of Wood and Nipa

1628 Spanish and Visayan forces landed on Bantayan Island led by Lazaro Mangubat New stone church was built the third in Bantayan and the second church that was made of stone; A Military Fort was also built (1628–1635)

1635 the Spanish Military abandoned the fort they built in Northern tip of Bantayan Island, handed the church to the religious, and moved to Mindanao and then to Mindanao Island’s southern region (now Zamboanga) where they established a military settlement and built a fort now known as the Fort Pilar

1635 Carlos de Figueroa December 4, 1635 Bantayan Island

1639 Juan Roa September 26, 1639 cura intero Bantayan

1646 Francisco de Acosta January 13, 1646 Cura Bantayan

1763 The Municipality of Bantayan was created and called "Pueblo de Bantayan" bearing the Island’s name and the name of the defunct settlement established in 1574 in the northern region of Bantayan Island. (Binaobao, Suba and other adjacent settlements combined to form the Pueblo) and it became the CABECERA (center) politically and ecclesiastically of Bantayan Island as it surpassed LAWIS an old settlement (founded in 1628) economically and by means of numbers of settlers and population growth

1872 Pueblo (town) of OCTONG now (municipality of Santa Fe) was created.
