= Mangubat =

Mangubat (Note: With the ng pronounced as in finger) is a Visayan, and old Tagalog word that means "to battle or combat".

according to Ifugao Tuwali language Mangubat refers to those who war against a group of people or country.

It is mentioned in Antonio de Morga's 1609 book Sucesos de las islas Filipinas:

These Visayans are a race less inclined to agriculture, and are skilful in navigation, and eager for war and raids for pillage and booty, which they call "mangubat". This means "to go out for plunder."
