= Shoti (singer) =

Filipino singer-songwriter

- Born: Jared Lim Almendras c. 2006 or 2007; Cebu City, Philippines
- Genres: Bedroom pop; R&B; Visayan pop
- Occupations: Singer; songwriter
- Instruments: Vocals; guitar
- Years active: 2022–present
- Label: Sony

Jared Lim Almendras (born c. 2006 or 2007), known professionally as Shoti, is a Filipino singer-songwriter. He signed a record deal in 2023 under Sony Music Philippines. He is best known for his 2022 single "LDR", which became a viral hit on social media and music charts in Southeast Asia. He records his songs in a mix of English and Cebuano.

== Early life and education ==
Jared Lim Almendras was born in Cebu. He is the eldest son of Wang and Jed Almendras. He is of Chinese and Filipino descent. His stage name, "Shoti", is a Hokkien term often used to refer to a "younger brother".

His parents were both DJs, which influenced his interest in music. During the COVID-19 pandemic, he started creating musical beats in his bedroom. Before becoming a singer, he tried streaming video games and selling beats online.

Shoti attends the Sacred Heart School – Ateneo de Cebu. He is a student in the Accountancy, Business, and Management (ABM) strand. He is also a varsity football player for his school and won the regional CVIRAA tournament.

== Career ==
=== 2022–present: "LDR" and signing with Sony ===
Shoti began releasing music independently in 2022. His early singles included "In Love Kaayo", "In Love (Gihapon)", and "Feel This Way".

He released the song "LDR" (an acronym for Long-distance relationship) in 2022. The song was inspired by his own experience with a long-distance relationship. "LDR" became popular on the platform TikTok, specifically after a "sped-up" version of the track went viral. The song entered the Spotify Viral charts in the Philippines, Singapore, Thailand, and Malaysia. By 2024, the original song had 35 million streams, while the remix had over 81 million streams. The song was nominated for Song of the Year at the TikTok Awards Philippines 2023.

Following the success of "LDR", Shoti signed a contract with Sony Music Philippines in September 2023. In November 2023, he released the single "waiting 4 u (delulu)". The title uses the internet slang "delulu" (delusional) and talks about relationships without clear labels.

In 2024, Shoti released the single "Night and Day". This track marked the first time he used an acoustic guitar in his recording.

== Musical style ==
Shoti's music is described as bedroom pop and chill R&B. He is known for using both English and Cebuano lyrics in his songs. He stated that he includes Cebuano because it feels "more sincere" and intimate.

== Discography ==
=== Singles ===
- "In Love Kaayo" (2022)
- "In Love (Gihapon)" (2022)
- "Feel This Way" (2022)
- "LDR" (2022)
- "waiting 4 u (delulu)" (2023)
- "Night and Day" (2024)

== Awards and nominations ==
| Year | Award Ceremony | Category | Nominated Work | Result | Ref |
|---|---|---|---|---|---|
| 2023 | TikTok Awards Philippines | Song of the Year | "LDR" | Nominated | |
