= Julie's Bakeshop =

Philippine bakery chain

- Logo
- Company type: Private
- Industry: Bakery
- Founded: January 6, 1981; 45 years ago
- Founder: Julia "Julie" Gandionco
- Headquarters: Cebu City, Philippines
- Number of locations: 600+ (2025)
- Key people: Joseph R. Gandionco (President and CEO)
- Products: Pandesal, bread, pastries
- Website: juliesbakeshop.com.ph

Julie's Bakeshop is a chain of neighborhood bakeries in the Philippines. Established in 1981 by Julia "Julie" Gandionco in Mandaue, Cebu, it has grown to become the largest bakery chain in the country by store count, with over 600 locations as of 2025. The company operates through a mix of company-owned branches and a franchising system.

== History ==
=== Origins ===
The company was founded by Julia "Julie" Gandionco, who entered the bread industry at the age of 50. Before starting the bakery, Gandionco operated three canteens as a concessionaire for factories in the 1970s. She noticed a high demand for bread among factory workers, which prompted her to open her own bakery to supply her canteens. The first Julie's Bakeshop opened on January 6, 1981, in Wireless, Mandaue. A second branch opened three months later. By 1984, the business had expanded to ten branches within Cebu. The first branch outside Cebu opened in 1988.

=== Expansion and franchising ===
The company began franchising in 1998, with its first franchise located in Camiguin. By 1999, the company opened its system to wider franchising, which led to significant national expansion. By 2011, the chain had grown to 500 stores, with approximately 99% of branches operated by 140 franchisees at that time. Under the management of Virgil Espeleta, who served as president and chief operating officer during the 2000s, the chain grew from 300 to 600 stores.

In 2013, the company announced plans to expand internationally by opening a branch in Tangerang, Indonesia.

The company celebrated its 40th anniversary in 2021 by launching new store concepts. This included a "snack shop" format at their flagship Banilad branch, which served rice meals and coffee alongside bread. During the COVID-19 pandemic, the company implemented a reseller program and delivery services to maintain operations. By 2022, Julie's Bakeshop held approximately 40% of the market share in the mid-price retail bakery segment in the Philippines.

As of 2025, the chain has over 600 stores nationwide. The company is preparing for its 45th anniversary in 2026 by expanding into more barangays in Luzon and Mindanao.

== Corporate affairs ==
Julie's Franchise Corporation manages the brand's network. As of 2024, the network split was approximately 55% company-owned and 45% franchise-operated. The current President and CEO is Joseph Gandionco, the son of the founder.

The company promotes multi-generational franchising, where licenses are passed down from parents to children. As of 2025, there were 16 recognized multi-generational franchisees within the system.

=== Products ===
The bakery is known for producing bread fresh every hour. Its main products include Pandesal, cheese bread, Spanish bread, and "Violet Cream Loaf". In 2009, the company introduced a "Nutribread" line, which used coconut flour to add fiber and protein. In 2016, they introduced "Pan de Julia", a sweet bun.

== Branding and marketing ==
The company's logo features a mascot known as "Tita Julie" (Aunt Julie), which represents the founder.

In April 2021, to mark its 40th anniversary, the company released a commercial that went viral on social media. The advertisement, created by the agency Gigil, featured the mascot stopping people from "Tita-shaming" (shaming middle-aged women) in a surrealist manner. The campaign received mixed reactions online for its bizarre visual effects.

In September 2021, the brand gained attention when netizens noted a resemblance between the Julie's mascot and the "Red Light, Green Light" doll from the Netflix series Squid Game.

== Incidents ==
In August 2024, a video circulated on social media purporting to show a rat running over bread on a shelf at a Julie's Bakeshop. The company issued a formal denial, stating that the store interiors and lack of product signage in the video did not match their standard store design. They also noted that they follow the Food Safety Act of 2013.

In March 2025, actress and brand ambassador Kim Chiu was involved in a political controversy when tarpaulins featuring her face were covered up at some Julie's Bakeshop branches in Mindanao. This occurred after Chiu made comments on the show It's Showtime that some viewers interpreted as a reference to the arrest of former president Rodrigo Duterte. The bakeshop management sent a letter of support to Chiu, stating they did not condone the covering of her image and had taken steps to address the incident.
