= Juanita Antido =

Filipina Vaudeville Actress

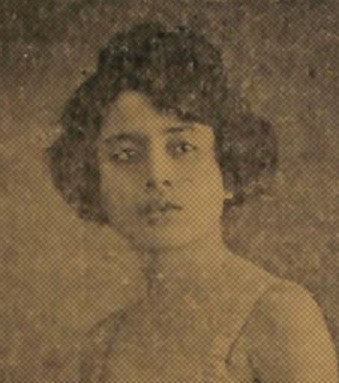
- Juanita Antido in 1926
- Born: ca 1900; Cebu, Philippines
- Died: 1945; Manila, Philippines
- Other name: "Queen of Jazz in the Orient"
- Known for: Popular Filipina vaudeville performer in early 20th Century

Juanita Antido (died 1945) was a controversial early 20th-century vaudeville performer. She was born in Cebu, Philippines around 1900. She became internationally known via performance tours in Penang, Shanghai, Singapore, and Hong Kong during the early 1920s with Filipina companion Conchita Blus.

== Career ==
While in Hong Kong, Antido and Blus served as live accompanying performers at screenings of the American silent film White Hands, which featured contemporary Filipina actress Elena Jurado. Each night before the showing, they would entertain the audience with song and dance. Antido and Blus were credited with the introduction of the flapper-era 'shimmy-shake' jazz dance to Singapore and Hong Kong during their tours in 1921 and 1922.

Some references, including a playbill in Hong Kong, suggest that Antido appeared in White Hands as a bit player, but no evidence indicates that Antido had made the trans-Pacific crossings during the October to December 1921 time period during which the film was produced. Indeed, during that time period she and Blus were touring in the Straits Settlements.

== Controversy ==
Antido's performances were often controversial and deemed scandalous in the Philippines. In October 1924, Antido entered the Convent of the Good Shepherd in Manila for the purported reason that her father had neglected her education, but her confinement in the convent was actually at the behest of Manila's Archbishop Michael J. O'Doherty. Antido escaped after a few months. She was recaptured and returned to the convent.

== Arrest and later release ==
At that point, a writ of habeas corpus, was filed by Attorney Vicente Sotto on behalf of Albino Cruz in the Court of First Instance with Judge Carlos A. Imperial presiding. Cruz had claimed that he was Antido's husband and that her confinement in the convent had denied them their marital bliss.

Eventually Judge Imperial ordered the release of Antido from the convent in early 1925. Upon release from the convent, theaters around Manila competed to contract her as a performer. She entered a contract with the Sine Lux theater with a salary of PHP500 per month, which was a substantial sum at the time.

== Later life and death ==
On November 6, 1925, Albino Cruz filed an adultery case against Antido. She was brought to court in Manila and convicted after having a child with her lover, Benjamin Quirol. Both Antido and Quirol were convicted of adultery and sentenced to three years of confinement in Old Bilibid Prison, beginning in August 1926. After her release in 1929, Antido and her child lived in obscurity. According to Philippine death records she died in early 1945, under the name Juanita Antido de Robles and was buried in Manila on February 12, 1945.
