= Potenciano Aliño =

Potenciano Aliño (c. 1864 – 1909) was a Filipino writer, translator, and revolutionary. He worked as a translator for newspapers in Cebu for works in Spanish and Cebuano. He is credited for having been the first person to translate Jose Rizal's Mi Ultimo Adios (Kataposan nga Panamilit) into the Cebuano language.

Potenciano, together with his brothers Felix, Hilario and Sulpicio fought as revolutionaries against the Spanish colonial rule. As generals of the Katipunan, Potenciano and his brothers staged an uprising in Talisay, Cebu but were ultimately repelled by the superior Spanish forces. However, their attacked inspired others to stage the Battle of Tres de Abril. He and his brothers also fought against the Americans during the Philippine-American war.
