= Cary Santiago =

Filipino fashion designer

- Occupations: Fashion designer, Couturier
- Known for: Couture, evening wear, Philippine terno
- Notable work: Philippine Terno collections, Gazini Ganados Miss Universe 2019 national costume

Cary Santiago is a Filipino fashion designer and couturier known for his elaborate evening wear, sculptural couture pieces, and contributions to Philippine high fashion. He is recognized for his hand-crafted designs, intricate detailing, and influence on the modern Filipino fashion scene.

== Early life and education ==
Cary Santiago grew up in Cebu, Philippines, the youngest of six children. His mother was a seamstress, which sparked his early interest in fashion. He began drawing dress patterns before attending school and assisted his mother in sewing as a child.

== Career ==
=== Early career ===
At 15, Santiago started designing for a ready-to-wear company in Cebu. By 18, he balanced his studies with freelance fashion work. At 23, he launched his own fashion business with the help of makeup artist Romero Vergara.

=== International work ===
Santiago’s reputation led to work abroad, including positions in Dubai as head designer for a couture house and later in Beirut, Lebanon. He eventually returned to the Philippines to continue his fashion career.

=== Style and recognition ===
Santiago is known for classic, glamorous, and romantic silhouettes. His couture designs feature sculptural forms, hand-crafted detailing, and elegance. In 2004, he won the Grand Prize at the Philippine Fashion Design Competition for a terno inspired by the Philippine eagle. He also represented the Philippines at the China Fashion Awards, earning the Outstanding International Fashion Designer Award.

=== Recent work ===
He continues to organize and participate in fashion shows, including producing events such as the Terno Gala and mentoring at TernoCon. His designs draw inspiration from culture, nature, and Filipino symbols.

== Notable clients ==
Santiago has designed for prominent personalities, including actresses Charo Santos-Concio and Dawn Zulueta, television host Kris Aquino, and international clients. He has also designed pageant gowns and national costumes, such as for Gazini Ganados in Miss Universe Philippines 2019.
