= Temistokles Adlawan =

Cebuano poet and writer

Temistokles Adlawan was a Cebuano poet and short story writer who often writes with irreverent humor usually associated with Cebuano folk. Some of his writings expresses a greater sensitivity to gender issues.

He is a Bathalan-ong Halad sa Dagang (BATHALAD) member and is active in writers' workshops sponsored by the Women in Literary Arts (WILA) and the Cebuano Studies Center of the University of San Carlos, Cebu City.

== Selected works ==
=== Poetry ===
- Lili (Peep), 1987.
- Mamamasol

=== Short stories ===
- Ang Gidak-on sa Dagat, 1966.

== Awards and recognition ==
- Posthumous award, Bathalan-ong Halad sa Dagang (Bathalad) Sugbo, August 24, 2019
- Taboan literary award, National Committee on Literary Arts, February 12, 2010
- 2nd CCP Literature grant for the short story entitled Tingog sa Kitarang Bagol and Program, Cultural Center of the Philippines, February 28, 1989
