= Marcelino Navarra =

Filipino Visayan editor, poet, and father of modern Cebuano short story

Marcelino M. Navarra
- Born: June 2, 1914; Tuyom, Carcar, Cebu, Philippine Islands
- Died: March 28, 1984 (aged 69); Tuyom, Carcar, Cebu, Philippines
- Occupations: Short story writer; Poet; Editor
- Writing career
- Pen name: Marcel Navarra
- Language: Cebuano
- Genres: Fiction; Poetry
- Literary movement: Realism

Marcelino M. Navarra (June 2, 1914 – March 28, 1984) was a Filipino Visayan editor, poet, and short story writer from Cebu, Philippines. He was regarded as the father of modern Cebuano short story for his use of realism and depictions of fictionalized version of his hometown, barrio Tuyom in Carcar, Cebu.

== Early life ==
Navarra was born and grew up in Tuyom, a small barrio in Carcar, Cebu, on June 2, 1914. He later was laid to rest upon his death on March 28, 1984, in his hometown. A product of American education, he finished up to second year in high school, and then moved to Manila to seek employment. Later, he settled back in Tuyom, married and had nine children.

== Literary career ==
He wrote poetry and over eighty short stories before and after World War II from 1930 until 1955 with the pseudonym Marcel Navarra.

=== Modern Cebuano fiction ===
His works were marked with the employment of realism at a time when fantasy, didacticism and sentimentalism were in vogue, earning him the recognition as the father of modern Cebuano poetry. His reputation as the best fictionist in his generation was cemented from the short stories he wrote after World War II.

Navarra is best known for the short story Ug Gianod Ako (And I Was Drifted Away) that won first prize in a literary contest by Bisaya Magasin in 1937. It was hailed as the first modern short story written in Cebuano language for its lyrical language, psychological realism and depth. According to literary critic Erlinda Alburo, Ug Gianod Ako and another of his short stories, Apasumpay (Postscript), were landmarks in Cebuano literature for their innovative use of point of view and the manner in which they blended local materials and Western narrative techniques.

=== Fictionalized Tuyom ===
In particular, Navarra's subjects often were the poor people in his barrio of Tuyom and their daily struggles for survival. Critic Sam Harold Kho Nervez claimed that the environment inhabited by his characters that was ravaged by war, poverty, and moral decay was a representation of their inner traumatized selves and considered his "brand of social realism outstanding". Teresita Maceda also commented that his fiction illustrated that the "barren land could yield beauty too, beauty of the more lasting kind... He showed Cebuanos a way of coming to terms with the difficult life demanded of them, a way that was the result of his realistic appraisal of his people's experience."

== Editor ==
He edited several Cebuano periodicals. He was the editor of Lamdag (Light) in 1947, associate editor of Bulak (Flower) in 1948, literary section editor of the Republic Daily from 1948 until 1952, and editor of Bag-ong Suga (New Light) from 1963 to 1967.

From 1938 to 1941, he was the literary editor of Bisaya Magasin . Before his appointment as its editor-in-chief from 1969 until his retirement in 1973, the magazine's circulation decreased that was partly attributed to the general decline of sales among regional magazines with the rise of the movie industry and the stream-of-consciousness writing introduced by its former editor, the University of the Philippines graduate Godofredo Roperos, which was not received well by its readers. During Navarra's term, the magazine's readership was sustained and increased despite the fact he maintained storytelling that continued to depict everyday human experiences that appealed to readers at a time when other periodicals resorted to sensationalism to attract readers.

== LUDABI ==
After Navarra stopped writing in 1955 upon the publication of the short story Zosimo, he remained active in the literary circle. Together with his contemporaries, he helped establish and once led the writers' group Lubas sa Dagang Bisaya (Core of Cebuano Writing) or LUDABI for short in 1956. The group, which has chapters in many parts of Visayas and Mindanao, had initiated annual literary contest in short story, poetry, essay, and one-act play that encouraged younger writers to creative writing and for older writers to shift in style and attitude.

He retired in December 1973 and died on March 28, 1984.

== Historical commemoration ==
- The book Marcel Navarra's Mga Piling Kwentong Sebuwano (Marcel Navarra's Selected Cebuano Short Stories) contains twelve of his short stories that were compiled, edited, and translated into Filipino and English by Teresita Gimenez Maceda. It was published in 1986.
