= Cebuano literature =

Literature of the Cebuano people of the Philippines

Cebuano literature includes both the oral and written literary forms Cebuano of colonial, pre-colonial and post-colonial Philippines.

While the majority of Cebuano writers are from the Visayas and Mindanao region, the best-known literary outlets for them, including the Bisaya Magasin, are based in Makati in Metro Manila. There is also a lively community of Cebuano-language writers based outside the country.

== History ==
Cebuano literature, as much as most literature of the Philippines, started with fables and legends of the early people in the Philippines and colonial period, right down to the Mexican (Viceroyalty of New Spain) and Spanish influences. Although existence of a pre-Hispanic writing system in Luzon is attested, there is proof that baybayin was widespread in the Visayas. Most of the literature produced during that period was oral. They were documented by the Spanish Jesuit Fr. Ignatio Francisco Alzina. During the Spanish colonial period, the religious theme was predominant. Novenas and gozos, most notably the Bato Balani for the Santo Niño.

The first written Cebuano literature is Maming, by Vicente Sotto, the father of Cebuano literature. The story was published on July 16, 1900 in the first issue of his Ang Suga. Two years later Sotto wrote, directed, and produced the first Cebuano play, Elena. It was first performed at the Teatro Junquera (in what is now Cebu City) on May 18, 1902. The play established Sotto's reputation as a writer. The dedication of the play by the playwright reads, "To My Motherland, that you may have remembrance of the glorious Revolution that redeemed you from enslavement. I dedicate this humble play to you."

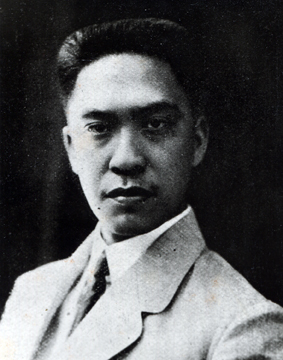
Vicente Sotto

Vicente Sotto attacked the decadent forms of linambay in his newspaper Ang Suga. He was challenged by a friend to write his own play as he was always attacking the linambay form. Sotto wrote the Cebuano Ang Paghigugma sa Yutang Nataohan (Love of the Native Land) as a response. The play was successful; Sotto organized the Compania de Aficionados Filipinos. Within the year, two more plays were written by Sotto: Elena, which deals of a girl's love for an insurrecto; and Aurora, which deals with a scandal involving the priests and nuns of the Colegio de la Immaculada Concepcion. Realism in Cebuano theater was stretched too much however; even Sotto himself was a victim of the movement he started, when prior to his running for mayor in 1907, a play by Teodulfo Ylaya entitled Ang Taban was released in 1906. The play dealt with a kidnap allegation involving Sotto.

During the American period, Ang Suga became the medium for publication of Cebuano writers. A community of writers slowly grow, to include the names of Florentino Rallos, Filomeno Veloso, Marcial Velez, Timoteo Castro, Segundo Cinco, Vicente Ranudo, Dionisio Jakosalem, Selestino Rodríguez, Filomeno Roble, Juan Villagonzalo, Leoncio Avila and Filemon Sotto. Most of these people were recognized for their achievements by the generation right after them, as evidenced by the use of their names for major streets in Cebu City, but their role in the furtherance of Cebuano culture is lost to subsequent generations. Juan Villagonzalo was the first to write a Cebuano novel.

Four typical novels on the love theme written by popular writers during the American period would represent the pre-war writers' subconscious but collective efforts in creating a common core of meanings and values in the face of new American culture. These are Felicitas by Uldarico Alviola in 1912, Mahinuklugong Paglubong Kang Alicia (The Sad Burial of Alicia) by Vicente Garces in 1924, Apdo sa Kagul-anan (Bitterness of Sorrow) by Angel Enemecio in 1928–29, and Ang Tinagoan (The Secret) by Vicente Rama in 1933–34. While Felicitas and Paglubong assert the value of marital fidelity and Apdo that of feminine chastity, Tinagoan challenges the emergent value that tolerates divorce. Such novels were seen as fictionalized renditions of their writers' stand or traditions and practices which were subjected to debate in the school stage and within the pages of periodicals.

The pre-war period in the Philippines is sometimes referred to as the Golden Age of Vernacular Literature, with the 1930s marking a boundary between two kinds of popular writing: the predominantly propagandistic and the more commercialized escapist literature that proliferated since the Commonwealth period. In the year 1930, Bisaya Magasin started publishing in Cebuano.

In 1936 Cebuano writers started publishing anthologies; readers engaged in amateur literary criticism; and complaints of plagiarism livened up the weekly news. Periodicals that featured creative writing mushroomed, although most of these were short-lived.

The generally considered first feminist Cebuano novel, Lourdes by Gardeopatra G. Quijano was serialized in the period May 26 to September 23, 1939 in Bag-ong Kusog (New Force), the most popular pre-war periodical. It has been predicted by no less than the late novelist and Philippine National Artist for Literature N. V. M. González that Philippine literature in English will die, leaving the regional literature (Ilokano, Waray, etc.). In the case of Cebuano literature, this has been the case.

Some of the prominent writers and poets in the Visayas and Mindanao who used to write in English have shifted to Cebuano. Among them are Davao-based Macario Tiu, Don Pag-usara, and Satur Apoyon, and Cebu-based Ernesto Lariosa (a Focus Philippines Poetry Awardee in 1975) and Rene Amper (a two-time Palanca awardee for English poetry). These giants of Cebuano literature are now regularly contributing to Bisaya Magasin; their shift to Cebuano writing has influenced young Cebu and Mindanao-based writers in English to follow suit (among them are Michael Obenieta, Gerard Pareja, Adonis Durado, Januar Yap, Jeneen Garcia, Marvi Gil, Delora Sales, Cora Almerino and Raul Moldez).

In 1991, Cebuano poet Ernesto Lariosa received a grant from the Cultural Center of the Philippines. He used the grant to introduce the 4-s in Cebuano poetry: social sense, sound and story. The language he used was slack, devoid of strong metaphors. He used the language of the home and of the streets. Writer-scholar Dr. Erlinda Alburo, director of the Cebuano Studies Center of the University of San Carlos noted in a forum sponsored by the university's theater guild in 2003 that the young writers (those given above) have given a new voice to Cebuano fiction. They have introduced modern writing styles, experimented with the Cebuano language and explored themes which have never been elaborated before by their predecessors.

Other influential Cebuano writers are Anito Beronilla, Vicente Vivencio Bandillo and Richel Dorotan, who is also known as Omar Khalid, his pen name.

The poetry of Vicente Bandillo, a native of Alcantara, Cebu, has surrealist elements.

There are now emerging number of publications featuring fiction and poetry in Cebuano. The ownership of the de facto literary journal, Bisaya Magasin, was transferred from the Chinese-owned Liwayway Publishing, Inc. to Napoleon Rama's Manila Bulletin Publishing in 2003, ushering a change in layout, acceptance policies and an increase in contributors' fees.

Aside from the reinvigoration of Bisaya Magasin, Cebu-based publishing houses have also started tabloids in the language (Banat News of Freeman Publications and SunStar SuperBalita of SunStar Publications). These tabloids have bigger circulation than their English counterparts. The U.P. National Writers Workshop every October and the Iligan National Writers Workshop every summer have reserved slots for Cebuano writers. In every edition of these workshops, there are Cebuano works that are being dissected or discussed by the panelists.

In 1998, the Carlos Palanca Memorial Awards for Literature opened the Cebuano literature category.

== Notable works ==
Note that not all of these are classified entirely as works of literature, but these are records of the Cebuano language.

- La Teresa (1852) – possibly the first novel (or "sugilambong") in the Cebuano language, a code of conduct written by Fr. Antonio Ubeda de la Santisima Trinidad. Though in a form of story, it was more of a list of conduct, thus cannot be entirely ruled as a piece of Cebuano literature.
- Maming (1901) – the first Cebuano short story written by Vicente Sotto. Considered by local historians to be the first Cebuano written work.
- Elena (1902) – the first Cebuano play, written by Vicente Sotto
- "Hikalimtan?" (1906) – a poem written by Vicente Ranudo
- Daylinda (1912) – a novel by Amando Osório
- Patria Amada (1916) – a play written by Amando Osório
- La Oveja de Nathan (1927) – a novel written by Antonio Abad
- "Inday" (1959) – a poem by Leonardo C. Dioko
- "Mga Luha sa Nahanawng Kagahapon" (1977) – a poem by Melchor U. Yburan

== See also ==
- Cebuano theater
- Philippine literature
- Filipiniana
- Philippine National Book Awards
- List of Filipino writers
- Philippine literature in English
- Philippine literature in Spanish
- Ilokano literature
- Hiligaynon literature
- Pangasinan literature
- Tagalog literature
- Waray literature
