= Amando Osório =

Filipino Visayan poet, novelist, playwright, and politician

- Born: February 8, 1890; Dalaguete, Cebu, Captaincy General of the Philippines
- Died: 1946
- Occupations: Politician; Poet; Novelist; Playwright
- Writing career
- Pen name: Gerundio Amar; Omanad
- Language: Spanish, Cebuano

Amando Navarette Osório (1890–1946) was a Filipino Visayan poet, playwright, novelist, and Cebu deputy governor. His novel Daylinda, Ang Walay Palad (Daylinda, the Unfortunate) was the first historical fiction in Cebuano literature and the third novel written in Cebuano language.

== Early life ==
He was born in Dalaguete, Cebu, Philippines on February 8, 1890 to Ricardo Osório and Filomena Navarrete, and acquired education in Dalaguete, Argao, Cebu High School (presently Abellana National School) and Philippine School of Arts and Trades. He later attended in Colegio-Seminario de San Carlos (presently University of San Carlos), Liceo de Manila, and the Colegia Mercantil. His marriage to Honorata Buenconsejo on July 9, 1918 bore six children namely Antonia, Carmen, Corazon, Inocencia, Ricardo, and Rodolfo.

== Writing ==
A bilingual writer (Cebuano and Spanish) and using the pen names Gerundio Amar and Omanad (after the hero in Daylinda), Osório wrote a book of poetry, a 133-page novel entitled Daylinda, Ang Walay Palad (Daylinda, the Unfortunate), and 12 plays. was also called the Visayan Horace on the preface of his collection of poems and one of the outstanding pre-World War II poets.

He wrote for Cebuano prewar periodicals including Vicente Sotto's Ang Suga and the magazine Babaye, where his poem Bitoon sa akong Yuta (Star of my Hometown) was published in 1931. On that same year, he was awarded the Ranudo Gold medal for poetry, a recognition that was named after the father of Cebuano poetry, Vicente Ranudo.

Additionally, he edited the four-page trilingual periodical La Revolucion (The Revolution) that saw print from 1910 until 1941. Other written works included Gramatikay, Binisaya, Bansay bansay sa Binisaya, and Pamalak sa Binisaya.

The novel Daylinda, published in 1913, became a bestseller. It sold 3,000 copies and Bisaya magazine serialized it in 1947. It was the third novel written in Cebuano language after Juan Villagonzalo's Walay Igsoon (Without a Brother) and Uldarico Alviola's Felicitas, and the first historical fiction in Cebuano literature. Set in pre-Spanish period, it is a romantic story where the hero perished in the Battle of Mactan. It is characterized as a written work that exhibited the conventions of costumbrismo, and literary critic Erlinda Alburo commented that it depicted patriotic pride on its focus on the battle where Ferdinand Magellan was defeated and slain.

Osório later on wrote plays and even translated Daylinda into a play that was staged in Bohol in 1914 and in the town of Ronda in 1917. Patria Amada (Beloved Homeland), a historical play and considered to be his dramatic masterpiece, was performed in 1916.

== Politics ==
He was the municipal president (present-day equivalent of mayor) of the town of Dalaguete for two terms and served as Cebu Deputy Governor. He was also elected as head of Nacionalista Party's Dalaguete chapter, and as president of Cebu's assembly of municipal presidents.

== Historical commemoration ==
- The A. Osorio Street in the town of Dalaguete, Cebu was named after him.
