= Cebuano theater =

Theater arts of the Cebuano people of the Philippines

Cebuano theater refers to the theater arts of the Cebuano people and those conducted in the Cebuano language. It also refers to contemporary productions and adaptations produced in Cebu City.

== Pre-19th century ==
Cebu has a long tradition of the theater arts. The arrival of Ferdinand Magellan in 1521 and Miguel López de Legazpi in 1565 both occasioned the performance of religious rituals that had the basic elements of theater. In 1598, a Spanish comedy written by the Jesuit Francisco Vicente Puche was performed in Cebu during the inauguration of a grammar school. In 1609 another Jesuit wrote a Cebuano play about the life of St. Barbara, which was performed in Bohol.

The next two centuries are sketchy in historical records.

== Late 19th century ==
In 1880 a Spanish zarzuela was performed in Cebu by members of Compania de Navarro, a visiting troupe from Manila. The prompter of the Compania, Eduardo Lopez, stayed in Cebu and became an important personality in the local theater. Other theater personalities at this time include Sabas Veloso, Sebastian Lingatong and Balbino Abadia.

In 1894 a Spanish play entitled El Alcalde Interino was held during the feast of St. John the Baptist. Lopez, Veloso, Lingatong, Maximo Abadia, Leoncio Avila, and Simplicia Alcantara (a singer of the Compania) were included in the performers. The guest during this performance was the governor of Cebu at that time, Gen. Inocencio Junquera. He was impressed by the performance but realized that a bigger space than the convent of Parian Church (where the play was held) was required. This led to his construction of the Teatro Junquera (see Junquera's article for more information).

Outside Cebu, Cebuano theater was liveliest in the town of Valladolid (now Carcar), where a local form of the theater, called linambay became popular. Some of the more popular linambays were Gonzalo de Cordoba, Doce Pares, and Orondates.

== Vicente Sotto's heyday: realistic Cebuano plays ==
In 1902, a young man named Vicente Sotto attacked the decadent forms of linambay in his newspaper Ang Suga. He was challenged by a friend to write his own play as he was always attacking the linambay form. Sotto wrote the Cebuano "Ang Paghigugma sa Yutang Nataohan" (Love of the Native Land) as a response. The play was successful; Sotto organized the Compania de Aficionados Filipinos. Within the year, two more plays were written by Sotto: Elena, which deals of a girl's love for an insurrecto; and Aurora, which deals with a scandal involving the priests and nuns of the Colegio de la Inmaculada Concepcion. Realism in Cebuano theater was stretched too much however; even Sotto himself was a victim of the movement he started, when prior to his running for mayor in 1907, a play entitled "Ang Taban" (1906, by Teodulfo V. Ylaya) was released. The play dealt with a kidnap allegation involving Sotto.

== Contemporary Theater ==
Contemporary theater in Cebu ranges from street theater, balak-dula, expressionistic theater, and musical theater. The Cebuano's love for music brought on the staging of several Broadway plays performed by Cebuano talents leaving original Cebuano plays in the background. Several efforts from various organizations including the Arts Council of Cebu and LUDABI were made to bring back the love and respect for stage plays in Cebuano written by local artists. A good number of modern playwrights and directors emerged through the years to include the late Daisy Ba-ad, Al Evangelio, Raje Palanca and Allan Jayme Rabaya. Their original works have been staged by various schools and organizations.

One of the leading school-based theatre groups is the University of San Carlos Theatre Guild, who have been successfully producing at least two theatre runs per year for the past two decades.

Independent groups emerged such as Al Evangelio's Pasundayag Sugbo, Emmanuel Mante's Young Thespians of Cebu, Daisy Baad's Out of the Box Theatre Co., Raymond Ordoño's Crystal Cavalier Productions, Hendri Go's Little Boy Productions, Sonny Alquizola's Cre8tive Thespians of Cebu, Inc., and Sarah Mae Enclona-Henderson's 2TinCans Philippines, Inc.

Currently, Cebu Theatre runs up to 20 titles per year.
