= Sulpicio Osório =

Writer (b. 1898, d. 1970)

- Born: January 17, 1898; Dalaguete, Cebu, Captaincy General of the Philippines
- Died: March 26, 1970 (aged 72)
- Writing career
- Pen name: Biyan Torinoy; Sulposor
- Language: Cebuano

Sulpicio Selerio Osório (January 17, 1898 – March 26, 1970) was a Filipino editor, poet, and writer of fiction and essay in Cebuano language.

== Personal life ==
Osório was born in Dalaguete, Cebu, Philippines on January 17, 1898 to parents, Estanislao Osório and Hilaria Selerio. His cousin is poet and novelist Amando Osorio. Sulpicio attended Cebu Normal University, and Philippine Normal College in Manila where he didn't finish his teaching degree. He once served as secretary of the municipality of Dalaguete.

== Writing ==
A prolific novelist and one of the early short story writers in Cebuano in the pre-World War II period, Osório used the pen names Biyan Torinoy and Sulposor. His first articles saw print in 1918 and he was actively publishing his novels, short stories, and essays well into 1920s and 1930s in various prewar Cebuano periodicals including Vicente Rama's Bag-ong Kusog. At one time, he had four serialized novels running simultaneously.

He became an editor for the periodical El Democrata in 1921.

His best known novel was Mga Bungsod nga Gipangguba (Destroyed Fish Corrals) which when printed in 1929 caused a stir for its anti-clerical theme and earned the Catholic Church's ire. Similar to the works of his contemporaries, the novel was characterized as heavily influenced by the 19th century European realism and naturalism and the 20th century American realistic fiction. His later works featured romance and melodrama such as Carlito ug Amparing that was published in 1947 and the trilogy: Sa Kinahitas-an sa Panganud (Upon the Highest Cloud) in 1928, Sa Kinahiladman sa Dagat (In the Depths of the Sea) in 1931, and Sa Kayutaan ni Konpusyo (In the Land of Konpusyo) in 1932.

He died on March 26, 1970.

== Works ==
Cebuano Studies Center of the University of San Carlos compiled a list of his works that were printed in Bag-ong Kusog.

== Historical commemoration ==
- In 1994, writer Gumer Rufanan was awarded a Literature Grant by the Cultural Center of the Philippines for translating Sulpicio Osório's Mga Bungsod Nga Gipangguba.
