= 1998 Palanca Awards =

Philippine literary award

48th Palanca Awards

The 48th Don Carlos Palanca Memorial Awards for Literature was held to commemorate the memory of Don Carlos Palanca Sr. through an endeavor that would promote education and culture in the country. This year saw the inclusion of a new Regional Language Division with three categories, open for short stories in three regional languages, Cebuano, Hiligaynon, and Iluko.

LIST OF WINNERS

The 1998 winners were divided into seventeen categories, with the short story, short story for children, poetry, essay, one-act play, and full-length play open to both English and Filipino Divisions, and the Dulang Pantelebisyon and Dulang Pampelikula open only for the Filipino Division, and the short stories in Cebuano, Hiligaynon, and Iluko in the Regional Language Division.

== English Division ==
=== Short Story ===
- First Prize: Lakambini Sitoy, "Touch"
- Second Prize: Vicente Garcia Groyon, "What I Love Or Will Remember Most About High School"
- Third Prize: Felisa H. Batacan, "Door 59"

=== Short Story for Children ===
- First Prize: Fran Ng, "The Brothers Wu and The Good Luck Eel"
- Second Prize: Luis Joaquin Katigbak, "Nico's Flight"
- Third Prize: Honoel Ibardolaza, "Masks"

=== Poetry ===
- First Prize: John Labella, "White Sill"
- Second Prize: Marc Escalona Gaba, "Shiva in Profile"
- Third Prize: Aida Santos, "15 Rhapsodies"

=== Essay ===
- First Prize: Rolando Loredo, "A Dogged Defense Against Dogmatism of Doggone Dogooders"
- Second Prize: Priscilla Supnet-Macansantos, "Departures"
- Third Prize: Ronald Baytan, "Queen of The Orient: Vignettes About Mama"

=== One-Act Play ===
- First Prize: No Winner
- Second Prize: Jeanne Lim, "My Mommie Dearest"
- Third Prize: Elmo Famador, "The Sun Shines In The Dark"

=== Full-Length Play ===
- First Prize: No Winner
- Second Prize: No Winner
- Third Prize: Felix Clemente, "The Day Philippine Military Honor was Savaged"

== Filipino Division ==
=== Maikling Kwento ===
- First Prize: Evelyn Sebastian, "Ipanalangin Mo Siya, Ipanalangin Mo Kami"
- Second Prize: Edgar Maranan, "Anino Sa Buhangin"
- Third Prize: Reynaldo A. Duque, "Aripuen"

=== Maikling Kwentong Pambata ===
- First Prize: German Gervacio, "Si Tanya, Ang Uwak Na Gustong Pumuti"
- Second Prize: Augie Rivera Jr., "Sa Ilalim ng Dagat"
- Third Prize: Remigio Alvarez Alva, "Dalawang Lumang Saklay"

=== Tula ===
- First Prize: Rebecca T. Añonuevo, "Pagtingala: Pananahan At Paglalayag Sa Mga Tula ng Lagalag"
- Second Prize: Michael Coroza, "Ako, Bana, Ama"
- Third Prize: Raymund Magno-Garlitos, "Kuwadernong Rosas ng Pagdating at Paglisan"

=== Sanaysay ===
- First Prize: Luna Sicat-Cleto, "Sa Pagdapo ng Paroparo"
- Second Prize: Roland Tolentino, "Ang Birhen ng Peñafrancia at South Border: Isang Personal Na Repleksiyon sa Pagtatanghal ng Spectacle ng Pagsalat"
- Third Prize: Domingo Landicho, "Dyipni"

=== Dulang May Isang Yugto ===
- First Prize: Abel Molina, "Ma-Te!"
- Second Prize: Roel S. Ang, "Digma"
- Third Prize: No Winner

=== Dulang Ganap ang Haba ===
- First Prize: No Winner
- Second Prize: No Winner
- Third Prize: Lito Casaje, "Padre de Familia"

=== Dulang Pantelebisyon ===
- First Prize: Rene O. Villanueva, "Salubong"
- Second Prize: Layeta P. Bucoy, "Ang Repleksyon ni Miss Trajano"
- Third Prize: Mes de Guzman, "Makina"

=== Dulang Pampelikula ===
- First Prize: Enrique Ramos, "Azucena"
- Second Prize: Oskar Monje, "KBL (Kasal, Binyag, Libing)"
- Third Prize: Lito Casaje, "Nokturnal"

== Regional Division ==
=== Short Story [Cebuano] ===
- First Prize: Ricardo Patalinhug, "Aron Usbon ang Kalibotan"
- Second Prize: Mario Batausa, "Ang Nagharag Nga Balite"
- Third Prize: Ernesto Lariosa, "Ang Baybayon Ni Simon"

=== Short Story [Hiligaynon] ===
- First Prize: Peter Solis Nery, "Lirio"
- Second Prize: Leoncio Deriada, "Tugalbong"
- Third Prize: Alfonso Hiponia, "May Lago, Manong Eddie"

=== Short Story [Iluko] ===
- First Prize: Ricarte Agnes, "Dagiti Ulep Iti Arinunos Ti Abril"
- Second Prize: Aurelio Agcaoili, "Wayawaya"
- Third Prize: Reynaldo Duque, "Dagiti Banias Iti Alintatao ni Pasintawi Gagan-ayan, Gagangay Nga Umili"

== Sources ==
- "The Don Carlos Palanca Memorial Awards for Literature | Winners 1998". Archived from the original on 2009-10-22.
