= Adonis Durado =

Filipino poet, journalist, and graphic designer

- Born: August 25, 1975 (age 51); Cebu City, Cebu, Philippines
- Education: University of San Carlos (B.F.A.); Ohio University (M.F.A.)
- Occupations: Visual journalist, poet
- Writing career
- Notable works: Not All That Drops, Falls; To Whom It May Not Concern; Who Steps Upon is Stepped Upon
- Notable awards: Philippine National Book Award 2023; NCCA Writers' Prize 2017; Lacaba Prize 2000

Adonis Durado is a Filipino poet, visual journalist, graphic designer, and educator. He writes primarily in Cebuano and is associated with contemporary Cebuano poetry, literary translation, editorial design, visual journalism, and communication design education. His poetry collection Who Steps Upon Is Stepped Upon won the Philippine National Book Award.

Durado has published several collections of poetry in Cebuano, many of them issued with English translations. His literary work has been discussed for its use of vernacular speech, humor, visual imagery, and formal experimentation. In addition to his literary work, he has worked in editorial design, art direction, illustration, and publication design.

== Early life and education ==
Durado was born in Cebu City, Philippines. He earned a Bachelor of Fine Arts degree in Advertising from the University of San Carlos in the Philippines. He later earned a Master of Fine Arts degree in Communication Media Arts from Ohio University.

In 2017, Durado received a Knight Fellowship from Ohio University’s School of Visual Communication. He later joined the university as a faculty member in the School of Visual Communication.

== Literary career ==
Durado has authored several collections of Cebuano poetry. His work has been discussed for its use of colloquial language, humor, visual imagery, and references to Filipino social life. Critics have also noted the influence of visual culture, photography, painting, comics, graphic design, and contemporary urban life in his poetry.

His collection To Whom It May Not Concern was a finalist in the 2019 International Book Awards. The book was also included in a CNN Philippines list of notable Filipino books published in 2017.

Durado received the 2023 Philippine National Book Award for Who Steps Upon Is Stepped Upon, which won Best Book of Poetry in Binisaya.

The award citation described the collection as an “exciting evolution in Cebuano poetry” and noted its use of politics, colloquial speech, and visual imagination.

== Critical reception ==
Durado’s poetry has been discussed by writers and scholars of Philippine literature. His poetry has been associated with the continuing development of contemporary Cebuano literature, particularly through its use of vernacular language, visual form, humor, and everyday social experience.

Critics and literary scholars have frequently highlighted the unique tonal and formal qualities of Durado’s poetry. According to National Artist for Literature Resil Mojares:

"Durado’s poetry glories in the richness of folk and popular speech – earthy and playful, reckless and disciplined, vulgar and sly, comic and (as in all good comics) subversive. But it is also poetry that is vitally current and global. Imagine Yoyoy Villame reborn as a poet and graphic artist who fancies De Chirico and Magritte and reads Derrida and Szymborska. Durado is one of the most exciting poets now writing in the country, in any language."

Similarly, in his column in Philippine Panorama Magazine, National Artist for Literature Cirilo Bautista described Durado’s poetry as turning “the Cebuano language into a seriocomic medium for commenting on the human situation,” highlighting the poet’s ability to combine humor, vernacular speech, and social insight through inventive linguistic play. Alfred Yuson identified Durado as part of an “exciting new poetry” emerging from Cebuano literature. In a 2009 essay on contemporary Philippine poets, Yuson praised the freshness, inventiveness, and modern vernacular energy of Durado’s writing, situating him among a generation of literary voices engaged in experimentation, visual imagination, and contemporary cultural expression.

Writer and critic Juaniyo Arcellana noted the distinctly Cebuano texture of Durado’s early poetry. Writing in The Philippine Star, Arcellana stated that the poems retained “that unmistakable southern feel,” even in translation.

Marjorie Evasco has discussed Durado’s A Swelling in the Loins in relation to formal experimentation, visual poetics, concrete poetry, graphic-text composition, comics, prose poetry, and multilingual play. Her discussion situates the collection within a broader expansion of Cebuano poetic form.

Simeon Dumdum Jr. wrote about Durado’s Shorts for the Shortjoyed, a collection of brief poems, in relation to compression and poetic imagination. Dumdum described the poems as possessing a “length of imagination” despite their short form.

Other writers have discussed the emotional, philosophical, and visual dimensions of Durado’s poetry. Lina Sagaral Reyes described his work in relation to transnational experience. Merlie M. Alunan characterized Durado as a poet of ordinary life and everyday speech. Poet Ester Tapia has also commented on the immediacy and sensory quality of his poems.

== Works ==
Original Title	English translation	Year	Translator/s
Dili Tanang Matagak Mahagbong	Not All That Drops Falls	2008	Merlie M. Alunan
Minugbo Alang sa Mugbo og Kalipay	Shorts for the Shortjoyed	2009	Anthony L. Kintanar
Lisay sa Bugan	A Swelling in the Loins	2016	Emmie Haidee Palapar and Anthony L. Kintanar
Pahinungod sa Di Hintungdan	To Whom It May Not Concern	2017	Marvi Gil, Gerard Pareja, Noel Villaflor, and Jeremiah Bondoc
Ang Nakayatak Kay Nayatakan	Who Steps Upon Is Stepped Upon	2021	Anthony L. Kintanar, Michael U. Obenieta, Delora Sales-Simbajon, and Catherine S. Viado
Tabyog sa Way Kinutoban	Swinging Without End	2023	Don Pagusara

== Awards ==
- 2023: 1st Prize, Bienvenido Lumbera Prize for Cebuano Poetry
- 2023: Winner, Philippine National Book Award for Who Steps Upon is Stepped Upon
- 2022: 1st Prize, Bienvenido Lumbera Prize for Cebuano Poetry
- 2019: Grand Prize, 39th Cebu Popular Music Festival for "Hugot Pas Huot" (Lyricist)
- 2019: International Book Award Finalist for To Whom It May Not Concern
- 2019: Second Prize, 1st Visayan Music Awards for "Balitaw" (Lyricist)
- 2019: Vicente Ranudo Literary Excellence Award
- 2017: VisCom Knight Fellowship (Ohio University)
- 2017: NCCA Writers' Prize
- 2012: Writer of the Year (Bathalad Inc.)
- 2002: Faigao Prize (University of San Carlos - Cebuano Studies Center)
- 2000: Lacaba Prize for Cebuano Poetry

== Design and visual journalism ==
As designer, illustrator, and art director, Durado's work has won international honors from the Society for News Design, the Society of Publication Designers, the Society of Illustrators, the Type Director's Club, the Malofiej Infographics Awards, Communication Arts Magazine, Creative Quarterly Journal, and HOW Design Magazine.

Durado helped launch and redesign more than a dozen magazine and newspaper titles in Europe, the Middle East, Africa, and Asia, and had served as a speaker to design conferences in the United States, Turkey, Ukraine, UAE, India, Indonesia, Bangladesh, and the Philippines.

His works are featured and cited in the books and periodicals, including The Newspaper Designer's Handbook (7th Edition / McGraw-Hill), All About Mags (Sendpoints Publishing), Creative Anarchy: How to Break the Rules of Graphic Design for Creative Success (How Books),, and Mastering Type (Bloomsbury Publishing).
