= Pierre Froment =

Pierre Froment may refer to a fictional character in:

- The Three Cities, 1894–1896 novel series by Émile Zola
- The Heart of a Nation, 1943 French drama film directed by Julien Duvivier
- Farewell (2009 film), French espionage thriller film directed by Christian Carion
