= Ernesto Lariosa =

Filipino Cebuano poet and writer (1944-2019)

Nyor Ernesto Lariosa
- Born: December 11, 1944; Tabionan, San Fernando, Cebu
- Died: August 20, 2019 (aged 74); Mandaue City
- Resting place: Panadtaran, San Fernando, Cebu
- Education: Bachelor's degree in education, law
- Alma mater: Southwestern University
- Occupations: Cebuano writer, fictionist, and poet; National Food Authority regional licensing chief
- Writing career
- Language: Cebuano, English
- Genres: Fiction; Poetry; Drama; Folk epic
- Notable awards: Three-time Palanca Awards recipient; Cultural Center of the Philippines Literature Grant; National Commission for Culture and the Arts Taboan Literary Award; Unyon ng mga Manunulat sa Pilipinas Gawad Pambansang Alagad ni Balagtas for Cebuano poetry and fiction

Ernesto Degumbis Lariosa, also known as Nyor Erning, (December 11, 1944 – August 20, 2019) was a Filipino Visayan writer, poet, and columnist from Cebu, Philippines and a three-time Palanca awardee in Cebuano short story. In 2003, he was recognized by the Cebu City government as the "Vanguard of Cebuano Literature".

== Personal life ==
Lariosa was born in Tabionan, a mountainous area in San Fernando, Cebu on December 11, 1944, and grew up in the neighboring town of Panadtaran where his family settled after World War II. He earned bachelor's degrees, a degree in law, and a degree in education major in English and history from Southwestern University. He was married to Susan with whom he had eight children: Marguel, Jobaner, Rhudiza, Jarrel, Emily Rose, Pachel Baron, Rudyard James and Erna Sue.

== Career ==
A prolific writer, Lariosa wrote 300 poems, 140 stories, dramas, and novels. The first of two-volume folk epic entitled "Kalisub", considered the first epic written in Cebuano language, that he authored was serialized in Bisaya magazine. His works appeared in various publications such as Alimyon, Bag-ong Suga, Focus Philippines, Graphic, Philippines Free Press, Sands & Corrals, Sun Star Weekend, and Women's Journal.

He was co-chairman and one of the founding members of Bathalad (Bathalanong Halad sa Dagang, Inc), a Cebuano literary writers group, and its predecessor, the ALBICALARIVI Poetry Group. By the invitation of Pachico A. Seares, he became literary editor, columnist, and the second language consultant of Sun Star Superbalita, a Cebuano tabloid, and authored a Cebuano language style book. Aside from his writing career, he was a regional licensing chief of the National Food Authority.

Lariosa died on August 20, 2019, from liver complications in Mandaue City. He was scheduled to appear in Mugna Creative Writing Center of Cebu Normal University on August 24, 2019, where he was expected to launch his first poetry book, "Bangaw sa Alimungaw". His family attended the book's launching in his stead.

== Impact ==
According to Hope Yu's critique on several of his writings, particularly the Palanca-award-winning short story "Bugti" (Exchange), "Lariosa shows that he comprehends nature to be a part of the human, as well as the cultural, and the social imagination as much as it is a physical entity to be experienced... By examining Lariosa's work, we see that he developed an environmental philosophy that sought to take on the destructive forms of human domination that affect the natural and social Cebuano landscape."

Lariosa was recognized as the "Vanguard of Cebuano Literature" by the Cebu City government by virtue of Resolution No. 652 enacted in 2003. He was also one of the most anthologized writers belonging to the Bathalad group. Sun Star Cebu dedicated an editorial in his memory, writing, "A mentor to many young writers in Cebu, a friend to many, a loving father and husband, “Erning,” as he was fondly called, had written his last poem: “Dinhi na lang kutob ang paghandom/May gitisok kong utlanan.” (Memory ends here/I have marked an end.) Ah, but the words outlive this great Cebuano." Bong Wenceslao, a Sun Star columnist, said, "Ernie championed writers in Cebuano, the reason why Bathalad was formed. There are many so-called champions of the Cebuano language but only few who are also writers or who are also passionate of the writing craft." According to Sun Star, his and Julian Daan's deaths were an immense loss to Cebuano culture.

== Awards ==
- 1972 Writing Fellow of Silliman National Summer Writers Workshop
- 1980 Gintong Butil Award for Best Publication Editor by National Food Authority
- 1991 Cultural Center of the Philippines Literature Grant for Cebuano plays
- 1993 Cultural Center of the Philippines Literature Grant for Cebuano criticism
- 1993 Bathalad Writer of the Year
- 1997 Don Carlos Palanca Award for Cebuano short story "Bugti"
- 1998 Don Carlos Palanca Award for Cebuano short story "Baybayon ni Simon"
- 2003 Don Carlos Palanca Award for Cebuano short story "Sakdapanay"
- 2003 Gawad Pambansang Alagad in Balagtas for poetry and story from the Unyon ng mga Manunulat sa Pilipinas
- 2004 National Fellow in the University of the Philippines "Likhaan" for Regional Literature
- 2004 Most Outstanding Alumnus for Literature and Journalism by the Southwestern University
- 2005 Bathalad Writer of the Year
- 2006 Bathalad Hall of Famer in Cebuano Poetry
- 2011 Cebu Archdiocesan Mass Media Award Best Column Writer
- 2013 Cebu Archdiocesan Mass Media Award Best Column Writer
- 2013 Taboan Literary Award from the National Commission for Culture and the Arts
- 2019 Bathalad Top 15 Literary Writers in Cebuano in the Post-World War II Era

== Books ==
- Crackshots and other stories. Translated and edited by Hope Yu. Cebu City: University of San Carlos. 2010
- Kaliring: Pinungpong mga balak ug sugilanon, Ernesto D. Lariosa, Pantaleon S. Auman, Lamberto G. Ceballos. BATHALAD. 1998
- The History of San Fernando. Provincial Government of Cebu. 2014
- The History of Carmen. Provincial Government of Cebu. 2014
- Bangaw sa Alimungaw. Lapu-lapu City: Alesna Integrated School. 2019

== See also ==
- Cebuano literature
