= Hope Sabanpan-Yu =

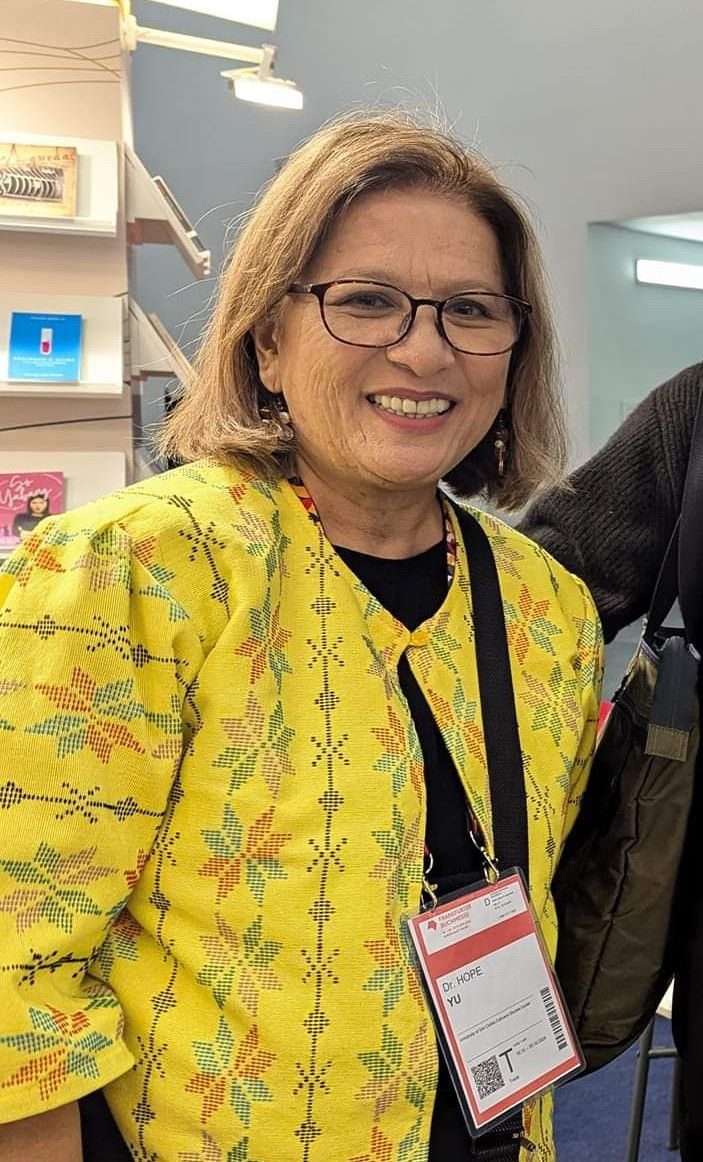
- Sapanpan-Yu at the Frankfurt Book Fair 2024
- Born: 1975 (age 50–51); Cebu, Philippines
- Occupation: Filipino Short Story writer/poet

Hope Sabanpan-Yu is a short story writer/poet from Cebu City, Philippines. She earned her doctorate degree in Comparative Literature from the University of the Philippines Diliman and her Master of Arts in English from the University of Calgary (Canada). She was a research fellow at the Center for Southeast Asian Studies at Kyoto University (2014), the School of Criticism and Theory at Cornell University (2004 and 2009), and the Summer Institute of Sexuality, Culture and Society at the Universiteit van Amsterdam (2007). She also pursued further academic and professional training, including a Professional Course on Digital Governance and Cybersecurity (UP-CIFAL Philippines and UNITAR, 2022), training on Women/Gender Studies in Asia at the Women's Action and Resource Initiative in Bangkok (2006), and Bahasa Indonesia studies at Universitas Gadjah Mada (2004–2005).

== Writing career ==
Hope is current Director of the Cebuano Studies Center of the University of San Carlos. She served as the Central Visayas coordinator and former chair of the National Committee on Literary Arts (NCLA) and as the secretary of the Women Studies Association of the Philippines (WSAP). She held the position of the Chair of the Humanities Division of the National Research Council of the Philippines (2017–2021) and sat as Commissioner in the Cebu City Cultural and Historical Affairs Commission (CHAC) until 2025. She is the Commissioner for the Cebuano Language of the Komisyon sa Wikang Filipino (KWF) from 2014 until the present.

A member of the Women in Literary Arts (WILA) and Bathalan-ong Halad sa Dagang (Bathalad), Hope writes both in Cebuano and in English. Her poetry has been published in several collections: Paglaum (2000), Ang Tingog ni Maria (2001), Beads (2002) and Mga Dad-onon sa Biyahe (2004). She edited three anthologies of interviews with Cebuano writers, Kapulongan: Conversations with Cebuano Writers (2008), and Kulokabildo: Dialogues with Cebuano Writers (2009), and Tampu: Writing and Influence in Cebuano Literature (2016) published by the USC Cebuano Studies Center. She also edited The Resil Mojares Reader (2015) published by the USC Press and Bag-ong Tala (2018) published by the Cebuano Studies Center. For the Komisyon sa Wikang Filipino (KWF), she edited the following Cebuano classic novel translations into Filipino: Walang Kapatid (2017), Apdo ng Kalungkutan (2017), Felicitas (2018), and Mga Bungsod na Pinanggiba (2021),

She co-edited Small wonder: a collection of essays (2010) and Patik: Postcolonial Poetry in Cebuano (2017) both published by USC Press, as well as The Sea and its Transformations in Cebuano Literature (2020) published by the National Commission for Culture and the Arts. She edited the late Cornelio Faigao's collection of poetry Canto Voice (2013) and also co-edited Brown Child: The Best of Faigao Poetry and Fiction (2013) with Erlinda Alburo, published by USC Press, and Feminest: History and Poems of the Women in Literary Arts with Haidee Palapar (2014) published by the NCCA.

Hope has also translated several authors of Cebuano fiction. Mila's Mother (2008), published by the National Commission for Culture and the Arts, is a translation of Austregelina Espina-Moore's serialized novel entitled Ang Inahan ni Mila. Men at Sea and other stories (2009), also published by the NCCA, is a translation of Gremer Chan Reyes's short story collection Binuhat sa lawod ug uban pang mga sugilanon. Crack Shot and other Stories (2010), a translation of the short story collection of Ernesto D. Lariosa's Hingigo ug uban pang mga sugilanon was published by the USC Press together with Where the fire tree grows (2010), a novel by Austregelina Espina-Moore. USC Press published two of her translated volumes, Reawakened Bliss (2011, with Haidee Palapar), a collection of Gardeopatra Quijano's short fiction and Hunger in Nayawak and other stories (2012, with Trizer Mansueto), a compilation of Lamberto Ceballos's prize-winning fiction. She edited Temistokles Adlawan's collection Because love is not blind (2012), translated by Merlie Alunan, and likewise translated another Austregelina Espina-Moore novel House of Cards (2013), both of which were published by the National Commission for Culture and the Arts. Her translation Breaking Ground: Cebuano Women Writing 1931-2000 (2017) published by the UST Press was a finalist for the National Book Award 2018 for Translation. Her recent translations include The Stories of Lolo Berto (2021) published by USC Press, Without a Brother (2024) published by Dual Story Brand Strategy, Inc. and Lagda: Alituntunin ng Dangal ng Taong Bisaya (2025) published by the Komisyon sa Wikang Filipino.

Other Cebuano collections she co-translated and edited into English are A Writer's Baptism: The Stories of Laurean Unabia (2018), That Black God and other stories (2019), both published by University of San Carlos Press, and South of the City: Tales from Carcar (2023) published by Dual Story Brand Strategy, Inc.

Her textbooks such as The Art of Truth: A Comprehensive Worktext in Creative Nonfiction for Senior High (2017) and Pinulongang Sugbuanon: Pagtulon-an alang sa mga Dayo (2015), both published by the University of San Carlos Press, have been used as resources in the senior high school and foreign students learning basic Cebuano. A Comprehensive Compilation of Extant Cebuano Music with Transcription and Analysis (2022), the publication of the NRCP-funded project she led that focused on transcribing and analyzing existing Cebuano music to preserve and promote the local musical heritage.

In 2007, Hope's doctoral dissertation was given the Best Dissertation award from the University of the Philippines. Subsequently, it was published by the University of the Philippines Press as Women's Common Destiny: Maternal Representations in the Serialized Cebuano Fiction of Hilda Montaire and Austregelina Espina-Moore (2009). It was awarded the prestigious Lourdes Lontok-Cruz Award for research excellence last April 30, 2010. Her other scholarly works are Bridging Cultures: The Migrant Philippine Woman in the Works of Jessica Hagedorn, Fatima Lim-Wilson and Sophia Romero (2011), Institutionalizing Motherhood (2011), The Controlling Mother (2014), a study funded by the Sumitomo Foundation, The Other(ed) Woman: Critical Essays (2014) published by the National Commission for Culture and the Arts. Her recent published academic books include This Thing of Darkness: Female Shapeshifters in Philippine and Japanese Literature (2018), another study funded by the Sumitomo Foundation, Nature and its persuasions: critical essays (2021) published by the USC Press, and Mas Masaya sa Entablado: Ang Siste sa mga Piling Dula ni Piux Kabahar (2022) published by the Komisyon sa Wikang Filipino.

== Awards ==
She has received numerous distinctions, including the NRCP Achievement Award (2025), the NRCP Service Award (2023), UMPIL Gawad Pambansang Alagad ni Balagtas (2020), the Don Vicente Sotto Memorial Award for Literary Excellence (2019), and recognition as a Finalist in the Metrobank Foundation Search for Outstanding Teachers (2016). Her essay collection Naglangoy sa Langit ug ubang gumalaysay (2019) was awarded the prestigious NCCA Writers Prize for the Cebuano Essay in 2014.
