= Cebu Normal University =

Public university in Cebu City, Philippines

- Unibersidad Normal sa Sugbo (Cebuano)
- Former names: Cebu Normal School (1902–1976); Cebu State College (1976–1998)
- Motto: Quality with Integrity
- Type: Public Coeducational Research State higher education institution
- Established: 1902; 124 years ago
- Accreditation: AACCUP ISO 9001:2015 Quacquarelli Symonds
- President: Dr. Laurence L. Garcia
- Vice-president: Dr. Daisy R. Palompon (VP for Academic Affairs); Dr. Angeline M. Pogoy (VP for Research, Extension, and Publication ) Atty. Roche E. Ocampo (VP for Administration and Finance)
- Dean: List: Dr. Helen B. Boholano (College of Teacher Education); Dr. Elena B. Lozano (College of Computing, Artificial Intelligence, and Sciences); Dr. Jezyl C. Cutamora (College of Nursing); Dr. Jarungchai Anton S. Vatanagul (College of Medicine); Ms. Mary Lou Go Puco (Student Affairs)
- Director: Dr. Grace N. Malaga (CNU Medellin Campus Director); Dr. Wilson T. Ibañez (CNU Balamban Campus Director)
- Students: 8,782 (S.Y. 2023–24)
- Location: Osmeña Boulevard, Cebu City, Philippines; 10°18′06″N 123°53′48″E
- Campus: Main (urban) Osmeña Blvd, Brgy. San Antonio, Cebu City; Satellite (rural); Brgy. Nangka, Balamban, Cebu; Brgy. Poblacion, Medellin, Cebu
- Newspaper: Ang Suga Publication
- Colors: Crimson and Gold
- Sporting affiliations: SCUAA-7
- Website: www.cnu.edu.ph
- Location in the Visayas Location in the Philippines

Cebu Normal University (Cebuano: Unibersidad Normal sa Sugbo), also referred to by its acronym CNU, is a state research university in Cebu City, Philippines established in 1902.

CNU is designated by the Commission on Higher Education (CHED) as Center of Excellence (COE) in both Nursing Education and Teacher Education.

== History ==
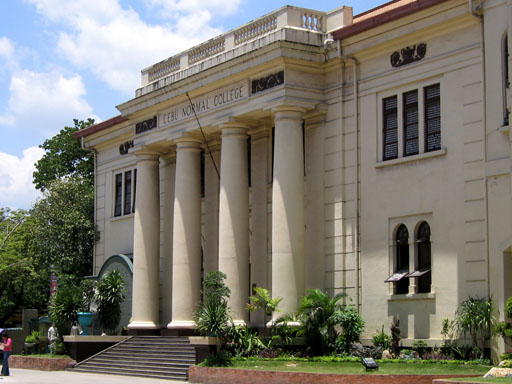
Facade of Cebu Normal University

=== Early history ===
CNU was established in 1902 by Act No. 74 of the Philippine Commission as a summer institute of the Philippine Normal University (PNS, then a normal school). It was then called "Cebu Normal School" and was the located at Colegio Logarta building (later Hijos del Pueblo) at the Colon Street by which the Cebu provincial government pays the amount of ₱200 monthly.

In 1906, the school became an adjunct to the then Cebu Provincial High School (now Abellana National School) and transferred to the new site. In 1924, the school became independent of PNS, obtained the normal school status and moved to its current site in Osmeña Boulevard, Cebu City. In 1926, it produced its first batch of graduates as a new educational institution.

=== CNU during World War II ===
The CNU campus was used as headquarters of the Kempetai or Military Police of the Japanese Imperial Army during the second World War. CNU also served as the largest POW Camp in Cebu. On March 26, 1945, 5 Filipino suspected guerrillas and 2 captured American airmen were summarily executed by the Kempetai in the southeast corner of the campus. On March 26, 1945, Allied forces landed on Cansojong Beach in Talisay, starting the liberation of Cebu. The United States Army made CNS their base.

=== Conversion into college ===
In 1952, the two-year general curriculum adopted in 1946 was changed to the four-year Elementary Education Curriculum, which was later changed to Bachelor of Science in education (BSE – Elementary Education) in 1954. This led CNS to become a tertiary institution. In 1959, BSE was changed into Bachelor of Science in Elementary Education. The Graduate School was opened in 1960 and produced its first M.A. graduate in 1966 – Rosemary P. Gellor. The Liberal Arts department (now College of Arts and Sciences) was established in 1977 and the department of Nursing (now College of Nursing) was created in 1982.

The school was then renamed as "Cebu Normal College" in 1966, then to "Cebu State College" in 1976 in accordance to P.D. 944. In the 1980s and 1990s the school's population increased rapidly and new buildings were constructed which now house the three colleges of the school: College of Teacher Education (CTE), College of Arts and Sciences (CAS), and the College of Nursing (CN), as well as the University Museum, the Integrated Laboratory School (ILS), the Graduate School (GS) and Balay Alumni.

=== University status ===
On June 27, 1998, Cebu State College attained university status and was named Cebu Normal University (CNU) under Republic Act No. 8688 signed by President Fidel V. Ramos. Under the Republic Act. 7104, CNU was designated as Panrehiyong Sentro ng Wikang Filipino for Region VII.

In 2005 and 2008, CNU had opened two extension campuses in Balamban and Medellin in Cebu. The university is Region 7's Center of Teacher Development and in August 2009 it became Region 7's sole Center of Excellence in Nursing.

=== Centennial celebration ===
On June 13, 2011, CNU celebrated its 100th Centennial celebration, delayed by nine years. The National Historical Commission confirmed its creation in 1902 with Samuel MacClintock as the first principal which was not known by the previous university administration. A strict review of MacClintock's annual report and upon the approval of the Malacañang Palace of the university logo, the administration was convinced that the university was indeed founded in 1902.

== Organization and administration ==
=== Governance ===
CNU is governed by a Board of Regents composed of the Chairman of the Commission on Higher Education, University President, Chairman of the Committee on Higher and Technical Education of the Senate, Chairman of the Committee on Higher and Technical Education of the House of Representatives, Regional Director of the National Economic and Development Authority, President of the Federation of Faculty Associations of the university, President of the Federation of Student Councils of the university, President of the Federation of Alumni Associations of the university and two representatives from the private and public sectors. The Board of Regents is the highest decision-making body of the university and the regents appoints the University President, confer degrees upon successful candidates for graduation and performs other administrative functions.

=== Organization ===
CNU is headed by a university president, appointed by the Board of Regents. The president is assisted by three vice presidents— for Academic Affairs, Administration and Research, Extension and Publication. The extension campuses are headed by a Campus Director appointed by the Board of Regents upon the recommendations of the University President. Dr. Filomena T. Dayagbil is the current Officer-in-Charge of the Office of the CNU President.

== Academics ==
=== Programs ===
CNU offers academic programs at the nursery, kindergarten, elementary, junior high, undergraduate, and graduate levels. In early 2020, the university announced of its upcoming offering of a College of Medicine which will offer a five-year degree of Doctor of Medicine with a master's degree in Public Health Governance. 2025 saw its offering of

As is the norm in the Philippine education system, instruction is primarily delivered in the English language with the exception of Philippine and foreign language subjects.

=== Undergraduate ===
The CNU undergraduate units comprise the following:

==== College of Nursing and Allied Health Sciences ====
The College of Nursing and Allied Health Sciences (previously College of Nursing) of Cebu Normal University was created through CSC Board Resolution No. 35 s. 1982. Through this board, Cebu Normal University entered into a consortium with Southern Islands Hospital (now known as Vicente Sotto Memorial Medical Center). Since then, the college has offered Bachelor of Science in Nursing with only one section for each level. The college had its first graduates in 1986. CNU's Nursing program has been recognized by the Commission on Higher Education as Center of Excellence since 2009.

==== College of Teacher Education ====
The College of Teacher Education of Cebu Normal University covers within its umbrella the flagship programs of the university. The undergraduate programs include Bachelor of Elementary Education (BEEd) and Bachelor of Secondary Education (BSEd) with varying fields of concentration and specialization. CNU's College of Teacher Education has been recognized by the Commission on Higher Education as Center of Excellence (COE).

Under the College of Teacher Education is the Integrated Laboratory School wherein fourth-year BEEd & BSEd students perform their practicum. The umbrella department is composed of programs from nursery to junior high school with most grade levels having one section, and some having two.

===== College of Special Needs, Early Childhood Education, and Lifelong Learning =====
The College of Special Needs, Early Childhood Education, and Lifelong Learning was established as part of the strategic restructuring of Cebu Normal University's College of Teacher Education. This reorganization brought together several key educational programs under a specialized college, including the Bachelor of Early Childhood Education, the Bachelor of Special Needs Education, and the Diploma in Professional Education (DPE).

==== College of Culture, Arts, and Sports ====
The College of Culture, Arts, and Sports of Cebu Normal University is one of three new colleges which were formerly from the College of Arts and Science created through CNU Board Resolution No. 123, Series of 2023. Undergraduate programs include Bachelor of Arts in Communication, English Language, Literature, and Filipino.

==== College of Computing, Artificial Intelligence, and Science ====
The College of Computing, Artificial Intelligence, and Science of Cebu Normal University is one of three new colleges which were formerly from the College of Arts and Science created through CNU Board Resolution No. 123, Series of 2023. Undergraduate programs offered under the college include Bachelor of Science in Biology, Chemistry, Physics and Mathematics.

==== College of Public Governance, Safety, and Sustainability ====
The College of Public Governance, Safety, and Sustainability (CPGSS) is one of three new colleges which were formerly from the College of Arts and Science created through CNU Board Resolution No. 123, Series of 2023. Bachelor of Arts in Political Science, Bachelor of Public Administration, and Bachelor of Science in Psychology are offered by the college.

==== College of Tourism, Hospitality, and Hotel Management ====
The College of Tourism, Hospitality, and Hotel Management at Cebu Normal University (CNU) is one of the academic units that emerged from the restructuring of the former College of Arts and Sciences. The college currently provides two distinct Bachelor of Science degrees in Tourism Management: one with a major in Travel and Hospitality Service Management and another with a major in Sustainable Tourism Management.

=== Graduate School ===
The CNU Graduate School offers Masters-level and Doctorate programs across the disciplines covered by the three colleges. It was opened in 1960 with Dr. Tecla P. Revilla, another alumna, as its first dean. It produces its first M.A. graduate in 1966 – Rosemary P. Gellor.

=== CNU-VSMMC College of Medicine ===
CNU and VSMMC administrators conducted a meeting in 2018 to establish the first state-run College of Medicine in Central Visayas. The program was granted permit under the Commission on Higher Education (CHED) in early May, 2021. It will offer a five-year degree program in Doctor of Medicine with Masters in Public Health Governance. An official press release from the Senate of the Philippines on November 30, 2019, expressed the support from the Senate President Tito Sotto and Secretary Michael Diño, Presidential Assistant for Visayas. The program was expected to admit 50 students in August 2020 but due to the COVID-19 Pandemic, the admission was moved to the Academic Year 2021–2022. To accommodate an increasing student population, CNU has expanded its infrastructure, including classrooms and laboratories on the 6th and 7th floors of the Cancer Center Building at VSMMC. In 2025, the CNU-VSMMC College of Medicine held its graduation of its pioneer batch of "Doktor Para sa Bayan" scholars, dubbed "Batch Primacordis." Twenty-two medical scholars were conferred with their medical degrees in the college's first-ever Investiture and Commencement Exercises.

=== College of Law ===
The Cebu Normal University (CNU) officially launched its Juris Doctor (JD) program for the School Year 2025-2026, and is the first state university in Central Visayas to offer a law degree, aiming to provide affordable and accessible legal education to aspiring lawyers. After submitting its application in September 2024 and submitting to an inspection in November 2024, CNU received its Certificate of Government Permit Level I from the Legal Education Board (LEB) on March 11, 2025, allowing it to operate the first year of the JD program. Approximate tuition fee is P22,000 per semester for a 17-unit load, the program targets financially challenged students passionate about justice. It admitted its first 100 applicants in July 2025. The College of Law is housed on the fourth floor of the Teacher and Arts Center (TAC) building.

=== Admissions ===
The university adopted a bi-semestral system wherein students enroll twice each year. Starting A.Y. 2018–2019, CNU opened the school year on August following the mandate of CHED. CNU operates with a selective admissions policy. All of the units of the university require, among other things, passing an entrance examination and past education records are also required for examination along with a final admissions interview. Application for Undergraduate admissions starts on October and ends on December with the college entrance examinations scheduled from January to March the following year. Results are posted on May along with the schedule of the final admissions interview. Only the successful applicants are allowed to enroll for the next academic year.

=== Accreditation ===
As a state university, CNU is a member of Accrediting Agency of Chartered Colleges and Universities in the Philippines (AACCUP). In February 2011, The College of Nursing and The College of Teacher Education were awarded the Level 4 Accreditation by the AACCUP (The Accrediting Agency of Chartered Colleges and Universities in the Philippines), being the first programs in the country to have been awarded such honors.

The university has also been declared by the Commission on Higher Education as a Center of Excellence (CoE) in Teacher Education and in Nursing. CNU is certified with International Standards Organization (ISO) 9001:2015 Quality Management System for Administration and Management of Commission on Higher Education (CHED) and Board of Regents (BOR) approved programs including the essential support to operations services and facilities as of August 2018 by Globalgroup. In March 2023, the university was declared a Three (3) Stars Institution by the Quacquarelli Symond (QS) Stars Rating System, which means that CNU is a “well-recognised [institution] nationally and may have also begun to attract international recognition.”

== University image ==
=== Seal ===
The seal of the university, as approved by the Board of Regents, is as follows: At the center of the circular field is the lamp of knowledge; leaning against it is a “kuryapi” which was the musical instrument played by Visayan men during the pre-Hispanic era. At the top are the three letters in the old Visayan alphabet that represents the initials of Cebu Normal University. This design incorporates both Western and indigenous symbols to reflect the spirit of CNU. At the bottom is the year 1902, the year when the Cebu Normal School was established. On the outer edge of the circle are the words Cebu Normal University, and at the bottom center, Cebu City, Philippines.

=== Name ===
Cebu Normal University is a normal institution which started as a teacher-training college thus remaining to be a training ground for teachers with it evolving as a comprehensive university. CNU was established and operated as normal school before it expanded its faculties and was organized as a state research university. It retained the word "Normal" in its name to recognize its historical purpose.

=== CNU hymn ===
Cebu Normal University

We hail your name with pride

To you we give our loyalty

Your light will be our guide

Cebu Normal University

We hail your name with pride

To you we give our loyalty

Your light will be our guide

Your nurtured dreams of crimson and gold

Through generations we will uphold

Your might and fame throughout will reign

Oh CNU, of thee we sing

In glory, in adversity

With vision, we move on

Cebu Normal, beloved University

Alma Mater, Carry on!

== Student life ==
The student organizations in Cebu Normal University comprises a network that cater to a wide variety of preferences ranging from academic, varsity, student government, publication, religious and special interest groups that is accredited annually by the Office of Student Affairs (OSA).

=== Student government ===
The Cebu Normal University - Supreme Student Council (CNU-SSC) is the highest student governing body in the university. An annually elected representative from the Federation of Supreme Student Councils in the university serves as the Student Regent, seating with CNU's governing body, the Board of Regents. The seven undergraduate colleges are also governed by their respective student councils that are under the CNU-SSC but are operating as autonomous units: Nightingale Student Council, Educators' Council, Konseho ng Alab sa Sining, Kultura, at Sports, College of Computing, Artificial Intelligence and Sciences - Student Council, College of Public Governance and Safety and Sustainability - Student Council, College of Tourism, Hospitality, and Hotel Management - Student Council and the Council of Educators for Lifelong Learning . All academic student organizations are under their respective college-level student councils.

The student government in Cebu Normal University is structured in a way that only the highest position in the Supreme Student Council bears the position of President while the highest position in college-level student councils bear the position of Governor, the degree program-level bear the position of Mayor and the class block-level highest position bear the position of chairman.

=== Student publication ===
Ang Suga Publication Publication is the official student publication of the university. It publishes periodicals and other printed materials funded, managed, and written by the students. Ang Suga Publication publishes at least two issues annually with the option of supplements, a monthly newspaper called The Normal Lights, and a literary folio, called Iridescence.

Ang Suga Publication also holds activities, contests, and events, such as the annual Art and Journ Festival which act as an outlet for the expression of the ideas, opinions and creative attempts of the university's undergraduate and graduate students.

Ang Suga Publication paper was the first campus publication to have a permanent Cebuano section, Tudling Sugbuanon, when most of the academe scoffed at the vernacular as being unworthy of an institution of higher learning.

=== Athletics ===
The college varsity teams compete in the annual State Colleges and Universities Athletic Association (SCUAA). Every year, CNU organizes the university-wide annual sportsfest, the University Intramurals which is participated by the undergraduate colleges and the two external campuses.

== Campuses ==
=== Cebu City ===
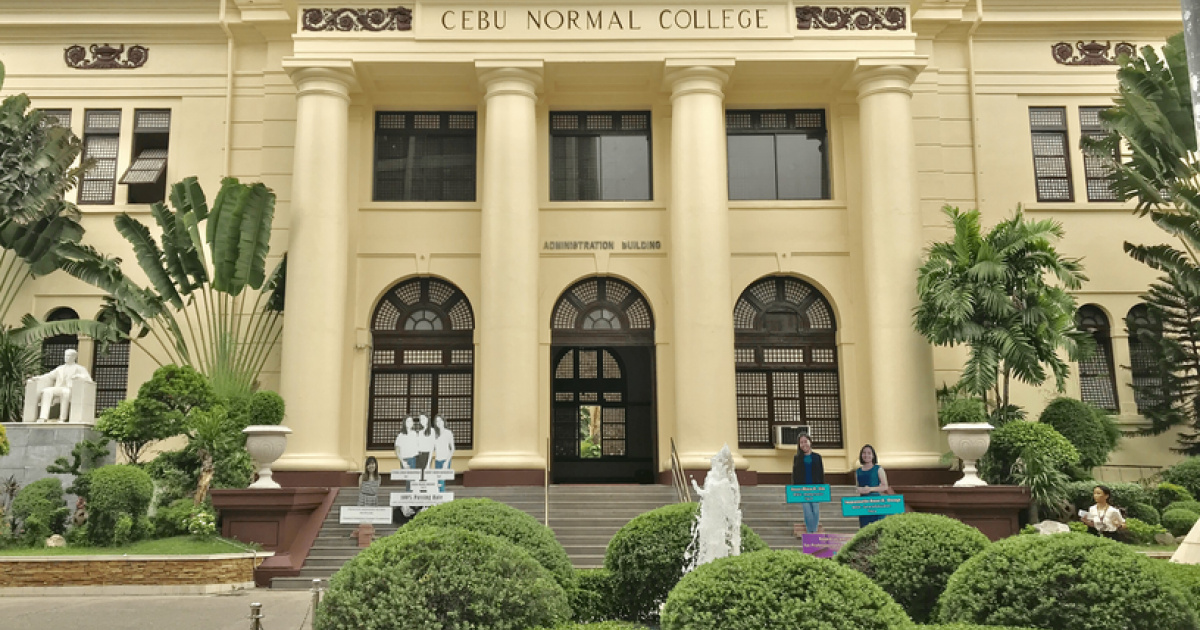
The CNU Administration Building

The main campus of Cebu Normal University is located at the Osmeña Boulevard, Barangay San Antonio, Cebu City. The university's administration building is one of the most distinct structures in the city in the 1920s. A World War II Memorial is also located inside the campus in remembrance of the Filipinos who were imprisoned, tortured and executed by the Japanese inside the campus during the second world war.

=== Balamban campus ===
The CNU Balamban Extension Campus was opened in 2005 at Barangay Nangka, Balamban, Cebu.

=== Medellin campus ===
The CNU Medellin Extension Campus was opened in 2008 and is located at Barangay Poblacion, Medellin, Cebu.

== Research ==
The CNU Center for Research and Development is concerned with supervising the research activities of the university. The Center for Research and Development is under the Vice President for Research, Extension and Publication and is supervised by the Director for the Center of Research and Development.

CNU's official research publication is the CNU Journal of Higher Education, a multidisciplinary, and peer-reviewed journal. It aims to disseminate relevant and significant researches across discipline as written by leading scientists and researchers. It calls for original articles (research studies, reviews, theoretical and methodological principles and analyses) on issues concerning the different professions from a multidisciplinary perspective. The journal publishes once a year.

The following are the research institutes of the university:

- Institute for Research in Innovative Instructional Delivery (IRIID)
- Research Institute in Computational Mathematics and Physics (RICMP)
- Research Institute for Ageing and Health (RIAH)
- Research Institute for Public Governance (RIPG)
- Research Institute for Tropical Biology and Pharmacological Biotechnology (RITBPB)

== Notable alumni ==
- Marcelo Fernan, former Senate President and Supreme Court Chief Justice
- Winefreda Geonzon, founder and former executive director of the Free Legal Assistance Volunteers Association
- Sheryn Regis, actress and singer
- Sulpicio Osorio, Cebuano Writer
