= Vicente Ranudo =

Filipino Visayan writer and father of Cebuano poetry (1882–1930)

- Born: April 29, 1882; San Roque district, Cebu, Captaincy General of the Philippines
- Died: March 6, 1930 (aged 47); Cebu City, Philippine Islands
- Occupations: Writer; Poet; Cebu Provincial Board Secretary
- Writing career
- Pen name: Hernani
- Language: Cebuano

Vicente Ranudo (April 29, 1882 – March 6, 1930) was a Filipino Visayan writer, poet laureate, and Cebu provincial civil servant. He wrote for various pre-war periodicals, including the first Cebuano newspaper Ang Suga, and was considered the father of Cebuano poetry.

== Early life ==
Ranudo was born in San Roque district in Cebu, Philippines on April 29, 1882. He studied at Colegio-Seminario de San Carlos (now University of San Carlos). In his time, San Carlos started offering courses in Spanish grammar, Latin prose, and poetry. In 1906, he married Francisca Rodis and the couple bore two children.

He founded the quasi-Masonic Cebu Lodge of the Theosophical Society in 1925 and served as president of the Legionarios de Obreros Libres, the Cebu chapter of Manila's Legionarios del Trabajo, from 1924 to 1926. Proficient in Cebuano, Spanish, and English, he was known to be a private person amidst his involvement in public service, print media, and civic organizations.

== Civil service ==
On July 1, 1901, he worked as a clerk in the provincial government and as chief clerk for the Cebu Governor's office in 1914. He later served as assistant secretary of the local committee of one of the first Cebu-based political parties, the Partido Independista, which was organized by siblings Filemon Sotto and Vicente Sotto.

When Sergio Osmeña was voted to the 1907 Philippine Assembly, Ranudo served briefly as acting Secretary of the Cebu Provincial Board under Dionisio Abella Jakosalem who was appointed as the governor until the end of Osmeña's unexpired term. In 1920, Ranudo again served as secretary and was then permanently appointed to this position by governor Manuel Roa by February 16, 1921, until he fell sick in 1929.

== Writing ==
Ranudo wrote under the name Hernani (alternatively Ernani), the title of a play starring a brigand pursuing his love for a lady who was promised to an ageing guardian. He contributed to the newspaper El Pueblo (1900–1906) and the first Cebuano periodical, Ang Suga (1901–1912), eventually becoming one of its staff.

Loling, a novel that was set during the Philippine Revolution, was said to have been written by him but scholars could not confirm the claim. He was also credited for contributing in a few of Vicente Sotto's plays such as Ang Dila sa Babaye (The Lady's Tongue) in 1905. Sa Tiilan sa Magtutudlo, a translation of theosophical work, was published after he died.

== Father of Cebuano poetry ==
Vicente Ranudo is considered the father of Cebuano poetry and a poet laureate. His influence on Cebuano poetry lies in the classical speech of which his poems were constructed, "highly elevated, formal, romantic tending towards the sentimental and the mystical." According to literary critic Erlinda Kintanar-Alburo, the poems Hikalimtan? (Forgotten?) and Pag-usara (Solitude) were examples of "metrical precision and balanced structure as found in traditional Cebuano poetry." Resil Mojares described him as an "enigma in Philippine literature" because his reputation lies in only two extant poems, and his works signified a departure from folk poetry in the way in which poems employed Spanish and later American artistic and literary influences as learned in the academe while stirring nationalistic pride.

His poem Hikalimtan? (Forgotten?) was believed to be published first in Ang Suga in 1906 bearing a dedication to his wife, and then it was reprinted in various periodicals. Another extant poem, Yutang Natawhan (Native Land), was written as song lyrics and explored a nationalistic theme.

Pag-usara (Solitude), a 60-line poem printed in La Epoca in September 1922 and considered to be his masterpiece, was described by Mojares, "Such qualities—purity of diction, expert metrics, and effective deployment of tropes—have made Pag-usara an outstanding piece in the Cebuano poetry of its time."

== Later years ==
He died on May 6, 1930, at the age of 47.

== Historical commemoration ==
The V. Ranudo Street, which starts at the corner of F. Ramos St. along Velez College, was named after him.
