= Winefreda Geonzon =

Filipina human rights lawyer (1941–1990)

Winefreda A. Geonzon
- Born: October 8, 1941
- Died: July 25, 1990 (aged 48)
- Other name: Winefreda Estanero-Geonzon
- Education: Cebu Normal College; University of the Visayas
- Occupation: Attorney
- Known for: Founder of Free LAVA
- Awards: Right Livelihood Award (1984)

Winefreda Amit Geonzon (also Winefreda Estanero-Geonzon; October 8, 1941 – July 25, 1990) was a Filipina lawyer and social justice activist. She was the founder and executive director of the Free Legal Assistance Volunteers Association (Free LAVA), a service organization that provides free legal assistance for poor prisoners. For her efforts, she received the Right Livelihood Award in 1984 for "giving assistance to prisoners and aiding their rehabilitation."

== Biography ==
Winefreda was born on October 8, 1941, to Eufronia Pelayo Amit and Ismael Estanero. She was one of seven children; her father died during World War II. She attended elementary school at Bogo Central School and high school at Cebu Roosevelt Memorial College in Bogo. She earned her BS in Elementary Education from the Cebu Normal College. She graduated from the University of the Visayas College of Law in 1976 and was admitted to the Philippine Bar in April 1977.

In 1978 Geonzon was appointed the legal aid director for the Cebu City Chapter of the Integrated Bar of the Philippines. Through her work she confronted abuses of the legal system that took place during the martial law of Ferdinand Marcos. Adults and children were incarcerated without being charged, imprisoned longer than their sentences, and subject to inhumane treatment. In one incident in March 1979 she met with 39 minors in the Cebu City Jail who were being held beyond their sentences, some for three years even though their initial sentence did not even require imprisonment. The jail offered no rehabilitation services, so Geonzon organized opportunities for minors to participate in boy scouting activities and earn certificates for good behavior. She also organized a civic assistance team to provide basic needs for prisoners who lacked basic necessities such as mats or clothing. Rehabilitation activities supported by the organization included literary classes, sports activities, cultural programs, and a spiritual ministry. She visited the Bagong Buhay Rehabilitation Center at Apas as well as other prisons.

Geonzon founded the non-profit, non-religious organization Free Legal Assistance Volunteers Association (Free LAVA) in 1983 to provide legal aid for prisoners who were victims of human rights violations. Free LAVA has a program of crime prevention, legal aid, and rehabilitation. Its volunteers visited prisons and gathered legal evidence for wrongly-imprisoned inmates. By 1987 the umbrella organization involved the collaboration of 26 community groups.

Geonzon was awarded the Right Livelihood Award in 1984 for "giving assistance to prisoners and aiding their rehabilitation."

Geonzon died of cancer on July 25, 1990. W. Geonzon Street, located in what is now the Cebu IT Park in Cebu City, was named by the Cebu City Council in her honor on August 19, 1991.
