= Cora Almerino =

Cebuano Visayan writer

Cora Almerino is a Cebuano Visayan writer. Her poems were included in Sinug-ang: A Cebuano trio published by Women in Literary Arts in 1999.
