= Uldarico A. Alviola =

Filipino civil servant, novelist and editor

- Born: July 4, 1883; Cebu City, Captaincy General of the Philippines
- Died: April 29, 1966
- Occupations: Politician; Writer; Editor
- Children: Virtud; Manuel; Marciano; Lourdes; Victor; Uldarico Jr; Rosario; Teresita; Corazon; Filomena; Socorro

Uldarico Aguilar Alviola Sr. (born July 4, 1883, and died April 29, 1966) was a Filipino Visayan civil servant, novelist, and editor from Cebu, Philippines. While he wrote in English and Spanish, his published works in the Cebuano language earned him the title "Dean of Cebuano Writers."

== Early life ==
He was born in Barangay San Roque, Cebu City, Philippines, on July 4, 1883. Little is known about his wife, although she was described to have the maiden surname of Calsas. Their family had 11 children namely Corazon, Filomena, Lourdes, Manuel, Marciano, Rosario, Socorro, Teresita, Uldarico Jr, Victor, and Virtud,.

Starting his writing career at the age of 19, he wrote under the pseudonyms Artagnan, Alvi, Sikatuna, M. Anabell, and arguably, Felix Gerardo, author of Justicia Social. He witnessed firsthand the imperial conflicts, from Spanish colonization to the American occupation and then later to Japanese invasion, at an age old enough to understand what was going on.

== Career ==
A Cebuano speaker educated in Spanish, Uldarico Alviola Sr. edited several bilingual publications (Spanish and Cebuano) such as El Nacionalista, El Precursor, and Respectador. He was also the editor of the Vicente Sotto-owned periodical Ang Suga when it first saw print in 1901.

Additionally, he was a pioneering and acclaimed novelist and fiction writer. He wrote Felicitas that was published in 1912. It was the second Cebuano novel, the first being Juan Villagonzalo's Walay Igsoon (Without a Brother). Critic Erlinda Alburo described the novel as a flat, poorly written novel; nonetheless, it exhibited elements of medieval mortality play. It was also characterized with a didactic tone.

Additionally, his English works were also published in The Cebu Advertiser, Vicente Rama-owned periodical Progress, The Star, and the Philippine Free Press.

== Political career ==
As a civil servant, Alviola worked as a municipal treasurer of the town of Oslob, Cebu. He also served in various capacities in the government including being the Secretary of the Provincial Council, Deputy Governor of Cebu, and Secretary of the then Municipality of Cebu, now the Cebu City Council.

== Award ==
In 1962, he received the major lifetime award, the LUDABI award from Lubas sa Dagang Bisaya, a leading national organization for writers in Cebuano language, for his contributions to Cebuano culture. He died on April 29, 1966.

== Historical commemoration ==
- A distinguished lexicographer, he is credited to have coined the words, "bugnong lugaynon" (electorate battle), a translation to the English word election, although other alternative, equally plausible etymologies exist.
- The Alviola Street in Barangay Tinago is in his honor.
