= Abellana National School =

Public high school in Cebu City, Philippines

Location
- Osmeña Blvd., Cebu City; Philippines; 10°18′04″N 123°53′45″E

Information
- Type: Public school
- Motto: Hail Abellanians
- Established: March 6, 1902
- Campus: Urban, 1 campus
- Color: Maroon
- Nickname: ANS
- Affiliation: Government, Department of Education (Philippines)

Abellana National School (ANS) is located in Cebu City, Philippines. It is a public high school established in the year 1902.

== History ==
Abellana National School is situated at Osmeña Boulevard, Barangay Sambag II in Cebu City. It was formerly the Cebu State College of Science and Technology (CSCST) - College of Arts and Trades.

The school was the first Provincial High School, organized under the authority of Act. No. 372 of the Philippine Commission passed March 6, 1902, and the high school was formally organized in Cebu in 1906. The school at that time offered a purely academic curriculum and it operated until the outbreak of World War II. In 1945, the Provincial High School was transferred to Argao, Cebu, and the City of Cebu established the City High School in the buildings vacated by the Provincial High School. The City High School had been named Abellana High School in honor of the great Cebuano hero, the late Governor of Cebu, Hon. Hilario Abellana who was killed by the Japanese during their occupation in Cebu. Then it was changed to Abellana Technical School and later to Abellana Vocational High School.

Since 1961, the school has been named Abellana National School by the virtue of the RA 3027 passed by Congressman Sergio Osmeña Jr. On June 10, 1983, it was converted into an extension campus of the CSCST by the passage of Batasang Pambansa Bilang 412. In the school year 2018–2019, the number of students was 5,228. The very first principal in the school was the late Mr. Valiente Cruz. While currently the school principal is Mrs. Evelyn Pielago

== Athletics ==
Abellana National School competes in the Cebu City Olympics.

== Notable alumni ==
- Carlos P. Garcia - President of the Philippines
- Marcelo B. Fernan - Senate President and Chief Justice
- Hilario G. Davide Jr. - Chief Justice
- Alejandro D. Almendras - Senator and governor of Davao
- Amando N. Osorio - poet, playwright, novelist
- Dean Ebarle - football player
- Ruperto K. Kangleon - Olympian, military officer, and politician
