= Inocencio Junquera =

Filipino civil and political governor

Gen. Inocencio Junquera Huergo y Sánchez (1831 in Gran Canaria – 1911 in Santillana del Mar) was a civil and political governor of Cebu, Philippines, from 1893 – 1895. He left a legacy to Cebuano culture by establishing the Teatro Junquera, the most important theater of Cebu in the late 19th and early 20th centuries.

Junquera's governorship was marked by protests from the Spanish friars, who saw Junquera as a liberal because he supported separation of Church and State.

== The Teatro Junquera ==
=== Construction ===
In 1894 the residents of the district of Parian (in what is now Cebu City) staged a Spanish play titled El Alcalde Interino. The play was performed in the convent of the old church of Parian (destroyed in 1878 because of misunderstandings between the residents and the Spanish friar assigned to the parish). The special guest was Junquera.

Junquera, who was also interested in the theater, commented that the convent is too small for a theater. He suggested to prominent residents Florentino Rallos and Francisco Sales that Cebu must have its own "real" theater and a Colegio de Artes y Oficios. After a few months, Junquera called for a meeting and discussed his plans to create a college with an attached theater in the same place were the old church of Parian was.

But Junquera was not popular with the friars, because of his support for church-state separation. His plans were blocked. When Martin Garcia Alcocer, the bishop of Cebu, knew the Junquera's plans, he immediately ordered the construction of a religious monument in the lot where the theater was to be constructed. He announced that the monument could not be removed because it has been blessed and therefore holy. The friars also spread rumors that Junquera would tax the residents to support his construction project. In the face of opposition, Junquera did not push through his plan for a theater in Parian.

Junquera found a suitable place in barangay Kanipaan (now the commerce center of the city), the lot of Rafael Veloso. He used his own money to finance the project. Other prominent individuals helped. Marcelo Regner and Rafael de Ocampo designed the arabesque style; Francisco Sales recruited carpenters and painters for the project.

The theater was finished in 1895, a year before Junquera left Cebu. It was, not surprisingly, called Teatro Junquera. On December 16 of the same year, before Junquera left Cebu, a Spanish play was performed by the Cebuanos to honor him. However, the formal inauguration of the theater was on April 19, 1896.

=== Transfers of ownership ===
The theater was later bought by Pedro Royo, a Spanish businessman and a filmmaker. Then it was bought by Leopold Falek and Pedro Rivera-Mir, and finally, by Don Jose Leon Avila (1884–1959), whose family still own the lot where the original theater was located. It was during Avila's ownership when the name was changed to Teatro/Cine Oriente. As years pass by, the Cebuanos stopped calling it Teatro/Cine Oriente but just Cine Oriente.

== Cultural references ==
- Junquera is honored by the Cebu City government by naming a street after him, Junquera St., three blocks away from where Teatro Junquera stood.
- In Cebuano, the term "Junquera" is synonymous with "red light district" because of the presence of street prostitutes in the area surrounding the street.
- Elena is a Cebuano play in three acts written by Vicente Sotto. It was first performed at the Teatro Junquera on May 18, 1902. The play established Sotto's reputation as a playwright.
- Junquera is the only Governor General who was beloved by the Cebuano people, because of his pro-people and non authoritarian, liberal-minded ruling of the people and the city, traits in which the friars and the higher Spanish authorities disapprove.

== See also ==
- Cebuano theater
