= Merlie M. Alunan =

Filipina poet

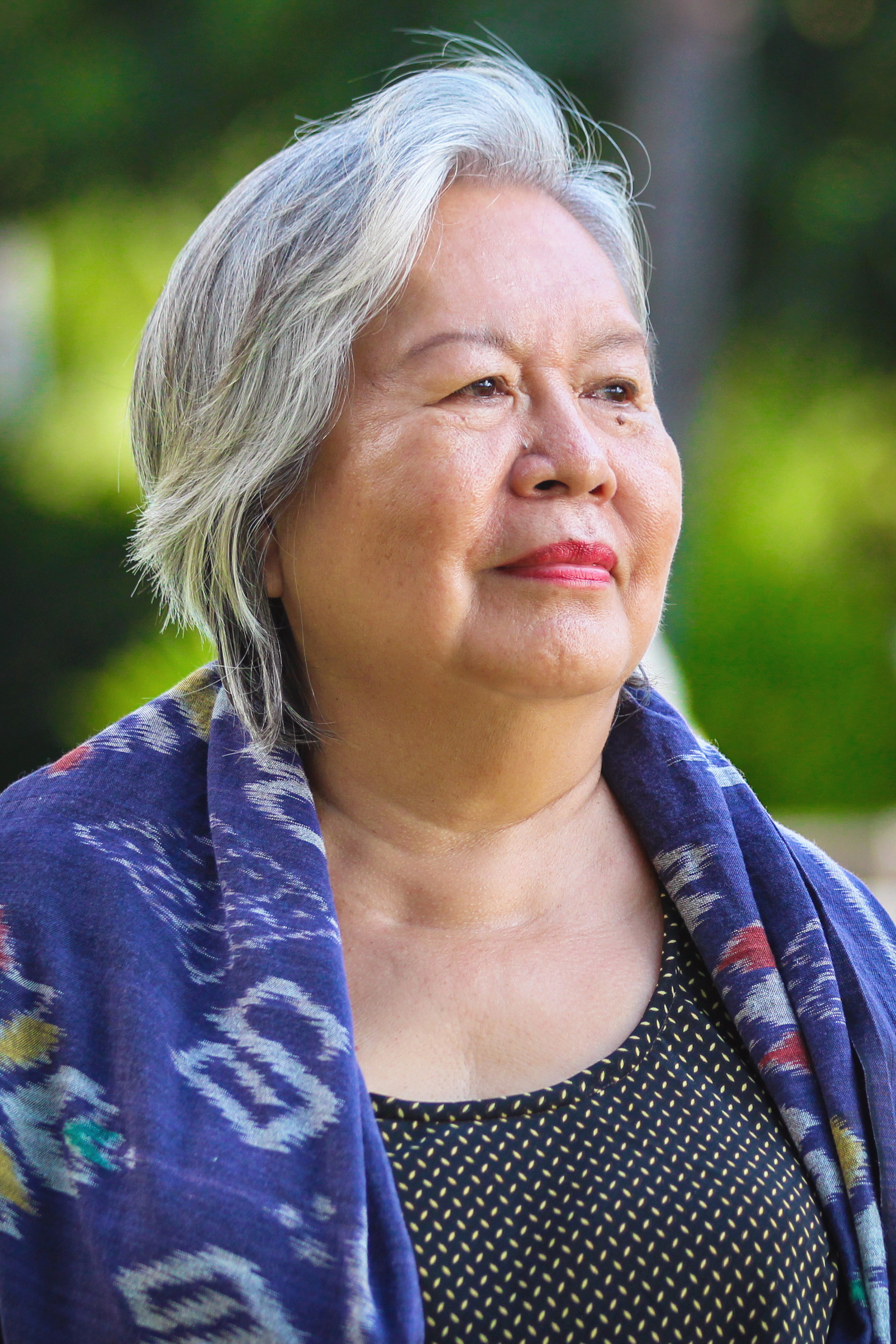
- Born: December 14, 1943 (age 82); Dingle, Iloilo
- Education: Silliman University
- Writing career
- Genres: poetry, short story, essays
- Notable works: Amina among the Angels (1997); Tales of the Spider Woman (2010)
- Notable awards: Palanca Awards (1988, 1992, 2007, 2010); Philippine National Book Awards (2017, 2018, 2019)

Merlie M. Alunan (born December 14, 1943) is a multi-awarded Filipina poet, teacher and mentor, and cultural worker in the Visayas.

== Life ==
Merlie M. Alunan was born December 14, 1943, in Dingle, Iloilo. Alunan graduated from Silliman University with a Master of Arts in creative writing in 1974. She taught Literature and Creative Writing at the University of the Philippines Visayas Tacloban College. She was awarded Professor Emeritus of the UP Visayas in 2008 upon her retirement. She lives in Tacloban City.

== Honors and awards ==
=== Local awards, honors, and distinctions ===
Don Carlos Palanca Memorial Awards for Literature
| Year | Title of work/s | Category | Award |
|---|---|---|---|
| 1985 | "The Gift Supreme" | Poetry in English | Third Prize, co-winner |
| 1988 | "Poems for Amina" | Poetry in English | First Prize |
| 1991 | "Poems of a Season" | Poetry in English | Second Prize |
| 1992 | "Dream of the Blue Gypsy and Other Poems" | Poetry in English | First Prize |
| 1995 | "Amina Among the Angels and Other Poems" | Poetry in English | Third Prize |
| 2007 | "Pamato" | Short Story in Cebuano | First Prize |
| 2010 | "Tales of the Spiderwoman" | Poetry in English | First Prize |

National Book Awards - Philippines (Manila Critics Circle and the National Book Development Board)
| | Year given | Title of work | Category | Award |
|---|---|---|---|---|
| 37th National Book Awards, 2018 | 2019 | Running with Ghosts and Other Poems | Best Book of Poetry in English | Winner |
| 37th National Book Awards, 2018 | 2019 | Tinalunay Hinugpong nga Panurat nga Winaray | Best Anthology in English | Winner |
| 36th National Book Awards, 2017 | 2018 | Susumaton: Oral Narratives of Leyte | Best Anthology in Waray | Winner |
| 35th National Book Awards, 2016 | 2017 | Sa Atong Dila Introduction to Visayan Literature | Best Translated Book | Winner |
| 32nd National Book Awards, 2012 | 2013 | Pagdakop sa Bulalakaw ug uban pang mga Balak | Philippine Literary Arts Council Prize for Poetry in the English Language | Finalist |
| 31st National Book Awards, 2011 | 2012 | Tales of the Spiderwoman | Philippine Literary Arts Council Prize for Poetry in the English Language | Finalist |

- 1984: Likhaan Award for Poetry, UP Creative Writing Center
- 1994: Free Press Literary Award for Poetry
- 1995: Free Press Literary Award for Poetry
- 1995: Home Life Magazine Poetry Writing Contest, Second Prize, "Hunger"
- 1996: Chancellor's Award for Outstanding Creative Work
- 1997: Gawad Alagad ni Balagtas Award
- 2003: Catholic Mass Media Award for Best Column
- 2004: Home Life Magazine Poetry Writing Contest, First Prize, "Mater Dolorosa in Two Voices"
- 2007: Second Prize Tula sa Cebuano
- 2009: Sangyaw Achievement Award
- 2014: Ani ng Dangal Award
- 2015: Gawad Kampeon ng Wika
- 2018: Garbo sa Ormoc for Literary Arts
- 2020: Nominated for the Order of National Artist of the Philippines
- 2026: Ani ng Dangal Award

=== International awards, honors, and distinctions ===
- 1997: Honorable Mention, Lilian Jerome Thornton Award for Poetry
- 2010: Ananda Coomaraswamy Fellowship in Literature, Sahitya Akademi, Republic of India.
- 2013: Sunthorn Phu Award for Poetry, Government of Thailand.
- 2025: Elected as Royal Society of Literature International Writer.
- 2026: Nominated for the Nobel Prize in Literature

== Works ==
- Hearthstone, Sacred Tree, Anvil, 1993, ISBN 978-971-27-0301-0
- Amina among the angels, University of the Philippines Press, 1997, ISBN 978-971-542-150-8
- Selected poems, University of the Philippines Press, 2004, ISBN 978-971-542-443-1
- Tales of the Spider Woman, University of Santo Tomas Publishing House, 2010.
- Pagdakop sa Bulalakaw ug uban pang mga Balak, Ateneo de Manila University Press, 2013.
- Running with Ghosts, Ateneo de Naga University Press, 2018.
- Tigom: Collected Poems, UP Press, 2023.

=== Edited non-literary anthologies ===
- Kabilin Legacy of 100 years of Negros Occidental, Negros Oriental Centennial Foundation, 1993. (Co-editor with Bobby Villasis)
- Kaaging Bisaya. UP Center for Women Studies, Ford Foundation, April 2003.

=== Edited literary anthologies ===
- Fern Garden: An Anthology of Women Writing in the South, Committee on Literature, National Commission on Culture and the Arts, 1998, ISBN 978-971-91500-6-0
- An Siday han DYVL, NCCA, UPTC VisWrite, Province of Leyte, DYVL Aksyon Radyo, 2005.
- The Dumaguete We Know, Anvil Publishing, 2011.
- Our Memory of Water Words After Haiyan, Ateneo de Naga University Press, 2016.
- Sa Atong Dila, Introduction to Visayan Literature, University of the Philippines Press. 2016.
- Susumaton, Oral Narratives of Leyte, Ateneo de Manila University Press, 2017.
- Tinalunay, Anthology of Waray Literature, University of the Philippines Press. 2018.
- Pinili: 15 Years of Lamiraw, Katig Writers Network Inc., 2019.

=== Anthologies ===
- Songs of ourselves: writings by Filipino women in English, Editor Edna Zapanta-Manlapaz, Anvil Publishing, 1994, ISBN 978-971-27-0356-0
