= Elena (play) =

Elena is a Cebuano play in three acts written by Vicente Sotto. It was first performed at the Teatro Junquera (in what is now Cebu City) on May 18, 1902. The play established Sotto's reputation as a playwright.

The dedication of the play by the playwright reads, "To My Motherland, that you may have remembrance of the glorious Revolution that redeemed you from enslavement. I dedicate this humble play to you."

== The plot ==
The play depicts the last few days of Spanish rule in a town in Luzon, before the capture by revolutionary forces. The curtain opens on a young mestiza, Elena, asking for and gaining the consent of her mother, Salvadora, to her planned elopement with and marriage to Marcial, an insurrecto and son of an insurrecto general. It is immediately clear that both women live in dread of the Spanish father, Ciriaco, the commander of the voluntarios (volunteers) of the town. Ciriaco hates Marcial and looks at him as a traitor to the flag of Spain and a dark-skinned upstart who has dared to fall in love with his daughter. He planned to marry off Elena only to a Spaniard.

Elena shows her mother a letter from Marcial. The letter describes how he is to descend from his mountain hide-out and steal her from her house. The letter is discovered by Ciriaco. Marcial is captured, beaten up, and thrown into prison.

Elena and Salvadora steal the prison key from Marcial's room and release Marcial. They intend to go with Marcial to the mountains. But the guard wakes up on them. Marcial seizes the guard's gun and shoots him. The gunshots rouse the other soldiers from their sleep. In the commotion Marcial escapes, although wounded. The women are caught. An infuriated Ciriaco orders them thrown into Marcial's cell, not knowing they were his wife and daughter (they covered their faces).

Marcial heals his wound in the mountain hide-out and persuades his father to permit him to join Commander Kidlat (a reference to Leon Kilat, the leader of anti-Spanish rebels in Cebu), the leader of the siege on the town. His father refused. Kidlat arrives and reports that the town is theirs for the taking because the Filipino soldiers have defected to the side of the rebels, the townspeople have openly declared their support to the attackers, and Ciriaco and his soldiers are just holding up in the tribunal, the seat of Spanish rule in the town.

In the tribunal, Ciriaco is compelled by his friends to bring down the Spanish flag and raise a white handkerchief. Then he signs a peace treaty with Commander Kidlat. After the commander leaves, Ciriaco contemplates a dim future for himself and all other Spaniards who, like him, have sought and found their fortunes in the colonies. But the hardest blow to his Spanish pride is having fallen prisoner to mga ulipon sa España (slaves of Spain). He shoots himself to death.

The insurrectos enter the town with solemn ceremony. Elena and Salvadora exults that the General (who is Salvadora's brother) has saved them all. But the General says, "It isn't so. Because your true savior is that flag which is now being raised," and he points to the Philippine flag which was slowly raised up the pole over the town. While the band plays Marcha Nacional Filipina revolutionaries execute present arms. The Spaniards lower their eyes.

== Notable characters ==
- Elena - a young mestiza (daughter of a Spanish father and an indio)
- Marcial - Elena's lover
- Ciriaco - Elena's father
- Salvadora - Elena's mother
- Commander Kidlat -The General

== Analysis ==
The conclusion of the play underscores its real theme of Motherland Filipinas and brings the development of the theme into full circle. Early in the plot, Salvadora's embittered confession to Elena about the real state of her marriage to a Spanish husband describes the unhappy state of the Motherland under Spanish domination: "I want you to know Elena how deeply I regret having married your father. He is making it clear to me now that my wealth was all he was after; my wealth that he has dissipated in gambling, drinking, and wenching. He snarls at me all the time. At the slightest pretext, he kicks me like an animal. He has brutalized over me most severely. In his eyes, I'm nothing but a lowly servant, a slave, now that he has dissipated the money that I've made. This is what I've got for marrying a man of alien race, blood, language, and culture.

== Background ==
It took nothing less than heroic courage for Sotto to write and produce this play when he did. At this time, the Filipinos were still seething with resentment at the American betrayal of their hopes and the new colonizers were retaliating with restrictions on the freedom of expressions.

== The Author of Elena ==
Vicente Sotto, also known as Nyor Inting (1877–1950), was a former senator of the Philippines, and considered as one of the greatest Cebuanos of the 20th century. He was a man of protean accomplishments: "father of modern Cebuano Literature", prolific writer and publisher, pioneering labor leader, renowned lawyer, and quintessential principled politician.

His principal achievement lies in two areas: (1) law, politics, and government; and (2) culture and letters.

Senator Vicente Yap Sotto is considered one of the unsung heroes of the Philippines. WikiPilipinas refers to Senator Vicente Sotto as one of the so-called “Forgotten” People in Philippine history – people who, unfortunately, were not given much attention in traditional studies and mainstream histories, but are equally heroic in their own simple yet significant ways. They are the peripherally discussed or rarely mentioned people who have nonetheless distinguished themselves for their heroic deeds and martyrdoms. They have often worked behind “prominent” heroes but have done dangerous and complicated tasks which made many battles and revolts possible if not successful.

He was called the "most militant and aggressive" of the Filipino advocates of complete and immediate independence in the first decades of the 20th century. His contemporaries called him the "Great Dissenter", an archetypal political oppositionist who fought for his convictions with little regard of the cost.A fighter of lost causes and "defender of the poor and oppressed", he was one of the most active and best-known criminal lawyers of his time. The acknowledged "Father" of Cebuano journalism, literature and language, Sotto was one of the leading Filipino intellectuals of the early twentieth century.

He was elected councilor, mayor, congressman, Constitutional Convention delegate and senator. Exiled abroad for seven years, disbarred on two occasions and imprisoned five times, few public figures led a more colorful life.

All of these do not quite sum up the totality, or the historical particularity of VICENTE SOTTO(1877–1950). (from the book "Vicente Sotto, The Maverick Senator" by Resil Mojares, winner of five Philippine National Book Awards).
