= The Three Cities =

1894–1896 novel series by Émile Zola

- Author: Émile Zola
- Original title: Les Trois Villes
- Language: French
- Published: 1894–1896
- No. of books: 3

The Three Cities (French: Les Trois Villes) is a novel trilogy by Émile Zola published from 1894 to 1898. The series follows the Catholic priest Pierre Froment, who loses his faith as he travels fin de siècle Lourdes, Rome, and Paris, each the setting of a novel.

== Bibliography ==
- Baysan, Gul (2022). "Le parcours de l'abbé Pierre". Litera: Journal of Language, Literature and Culture Studies (in French). 32 (1): 165–182. doi:10.26650/litera2021-971874. ISSN 1304-0057.
