= Erlinda K. Alburo =

Cebuano academic

Erlinda Kintanar Alburo is a prolific contemporary Cebuano language scholar and promoter of the language. She is the former Director of the Cebuano Studies Center of the University of San Carlos, Philippines. She is an active member of Women in Literary Arts (WILA), and writes poetry both in English and cebuano. She teaches on the anthropology of linguistics. She has written 54 works in 4 languages.

== Career ==
In 2012, Dr. Kintanar-Alburo was honored at the 79th NRCP Awards for her contributions to cultural research of literature, folklore, linguistics, and history of the Philippines.

== Works ==
- On Cebuano Folklore, by Erlinda Kintanar-Alburo. 2016
- Bisayangdako: Writing Cebuano Culture and Arts. 2015
- Cebu Provincial History Project. Cluster 1 editor
- Sinug-ang: A Cebuano trio, by Erlinda K. Alburo, Cora Almerio, and Ester Tapia. Women in Literary Arts-Cebu, Inc., 1999. Poems in English by three Cebuanas.
- Dulaang Cebuano, edited by Erlinda K. Alburo, Resil Mojares, and Don Pagusara. Ateneo de Manila University Press, 1993. Collection of Cebuano plays.
- Panulaang Cebuano, collected by Erlinda K. Alburo and with introduction by Resil B. Mojares. Ateneo de Manila University Press, 1993. Collection of Cebuano poems.
- Bibliography of Cebuano folklore, University of San Carlos, 1977.
- Cebuano poetry = Sugboanong balak. Edited and translated by Erlinda K. Alburo et al. Cebuano Studies Center, University of San Carlos, 1988. Cebuano poetry with translations into English.
- Centering voices: an anthology. Edited by Erlinda K. Alburo, Erma M. Cuizon and Ma. Paloma A. Sandiego. Women in Literary Arts, 1995. Poems and short stories in English and Tagalog.
- Bibliography of Cebuano Folklore. 1979
- Cebuano folksongs. Editor/translator, Erlinda K. Alburo. University of San Carlos, 1978.
- Gawad Bonifacio sa panitikan. Editor for Cebuano. National Commission for Culture and the Arts, 1998. Collection of Philippines literature about Bonifacio.
- Cebu: more than an island. Essays on cultural topics by Resil B. Mojares, Reina-Marie C. Bernaldez, Raymund L. Fernandez, Erlinda K. Alburo, Melva R. Java, Jovi and Ma. Cristina Juan, Reynaldo E. Martires, Erma M. Cuizon, and Jenara R. Newman. Ayala Foundation, 1997.
