= Vicente Sotto =

Filipino politician, playwright and journalist

Vicente Y. Sotto
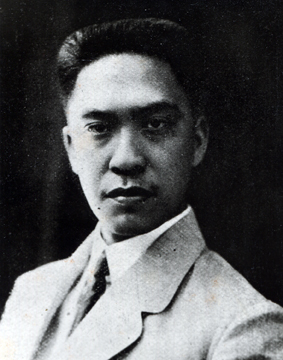
- Sotto in 1917

Senator of the Philippines
- In office May 25, 1946 – May 28, 1950

Member of the Philippine House of Representatives from Cebu's 2nd district
- In office October 27, 1922 – February 8, 1925
- Preceded by: Sergio Osmeña
- Succeeded by: Paulino Gullas

Personal details
- Born: Vicente Sotto é Yap; April 18, 1877 Cebu City, Captaincy General of the Philippines
- Died: May 28, 1950 (aged 73) Manila, Philippines
- Resting place: Cebu Memorial Park; Cebu City
- Party: Popular Front (1936–1950)
- Other political affiliations: Democrata (1922–1925)
- Spouse: María Ojeda y Festín
- Children: Suga Sotto-Yuvienco; Voltaire Sotto; Filemon O. Sotto; Vicente O. Sotto Jr. Marcelino Antonio O. Sotto; Britania Sotto-Yanong; Francia Sotto; Noli Sotto; Juris Sotto-Lozada; Hispania Sotto-Malvar
- Relatives: Sotto family

Vicente Yap Sotto Sr. (Tagalog: [bɪˈsɛntɛ ˈsɔtɔ]; April 18, 1877 – May 28, 1950) was a Filipino playwright, journalist, and politician who served as a senator from 1946 to 1950. He also served in the House of Representatives from 1922 to 1925, representing Cebu's 2nd district. He was the main author of the Press Freedom Law (now known as the Sotto Law, Republic Act No. 53).

== Personal life ==
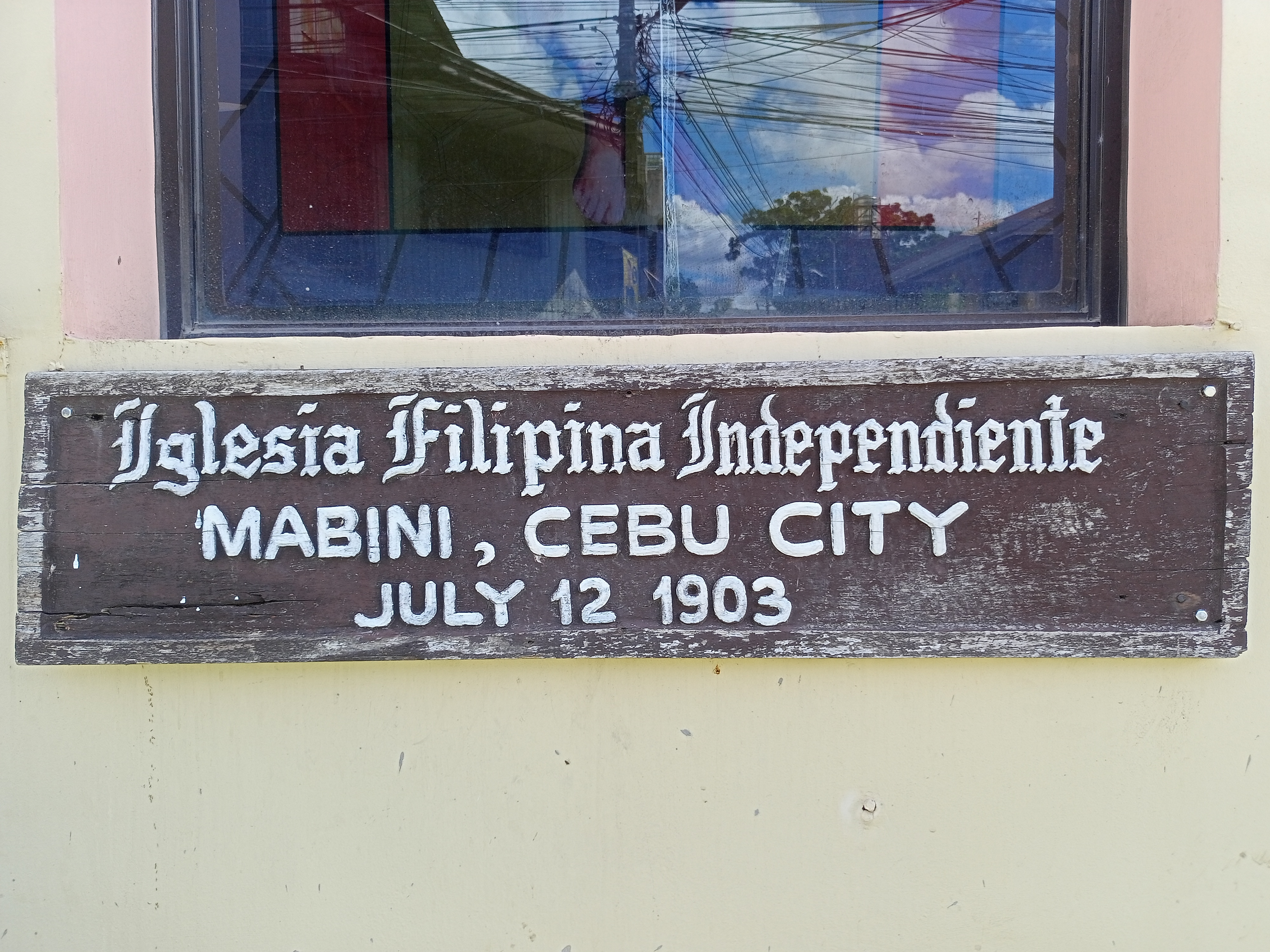
Sotto donated the lot in A. Mabini Street at Barangay Tinago, near Parián district, where the Cathedral of the Philippine Independent Church (Iglesia Filipina Independiente) Diocese of Cebu is situated. The church is dedicated to Santo Niño de Cebú.

Sotto was born in Cebu City on April 18, 1877, to Marcelino Antonio Sotto y Legaspi, Binondo-born Spanish mestizo, and Pascuala Yap y Lim, a Cebu-born Chinese mestiza. He is the younger brother of Filemón Sotto.

He finished his secondary education at the University of San Carlos (formerly Colegio de San Carlos), Cebu City. He obtained the degree of Bachelor of Laws in Letran and Judicial Science and studied law in Manila Law College and passed the bar examinations in 1907. Sotto was a member of the Philippine Independent Church (also known as the Aglipayan Church) as he saw independence from the Roman Catholic Church as a source of national pride. Sotto became a close acquaintance of Gregorio Aglipay and was a legal counsel of the Aglipayan Church in numerous legal battles.

== Political career ==
In 1902, Sotto entered politics when he ran for the municipal council of Cebu and won. In 1907, he was elected mayor despite his absence during the election owing to his involvement in a court battle caused by a kidnapping suit lodge against him by his opponent, and was forced to stay in Hong Kong. Sotto returned to the country in 1914.

In 1922, he was elected representative of the second district of Cebu until 1925. In 1934, Sotto ran for senator but lost the elections. In 1937, he ran for governor of Cebu but lost.

=== Senate ===
In May 1946, he ran for senator and won and served as Chairman of the Senate Committee on Finance until 1950. He served in the Senate until his death in 1950.

== Death ==
When he died on May 28, 1950, at the age of 73, his colleagues in the Senate remembered him as "recalcitrant, principled Sotto."

== Contributions ==
=== To government and Philippine independence ===
Sotto was the main author of the Press Freedom Law (now known as the Sotto Law, Republic Act No. 53) enacted in 1946. The Sotto Law protects journalists from being compelled to name their news sources.

In 1899 (then just 22 years old), he put up La Justicia, the first newspaper in Cebu published by a Philippine citizen, in which he defended the issue of Philippine independence. It was suspended on orders by the American military governor.

In the week following, the undaunted Sotto begun publishing El Nacional. This was also ordered closed and Sotto was imprisoned at Fort San Pedro for two months and six days. After this experience, he began using the pen name Taga Kotta (of the fort, or resident of the fort).

He was found guilty of treason as a member of a committee of rebels along with those in Manila and Hong Kong. When he was freed in 1900, he published Ang Suga (The Light), which was first issued on June 16, 1901.

He organized in Hong Kong in 1911 the English–Spanish fortnightly The Philippine Republic. Its publication was stopped a year later and its editor was arrested. Sotto's extradition was requested three times by the American government but every time it was denied by the British courts. The Philippine Republic resumed publication after a month of suspension.

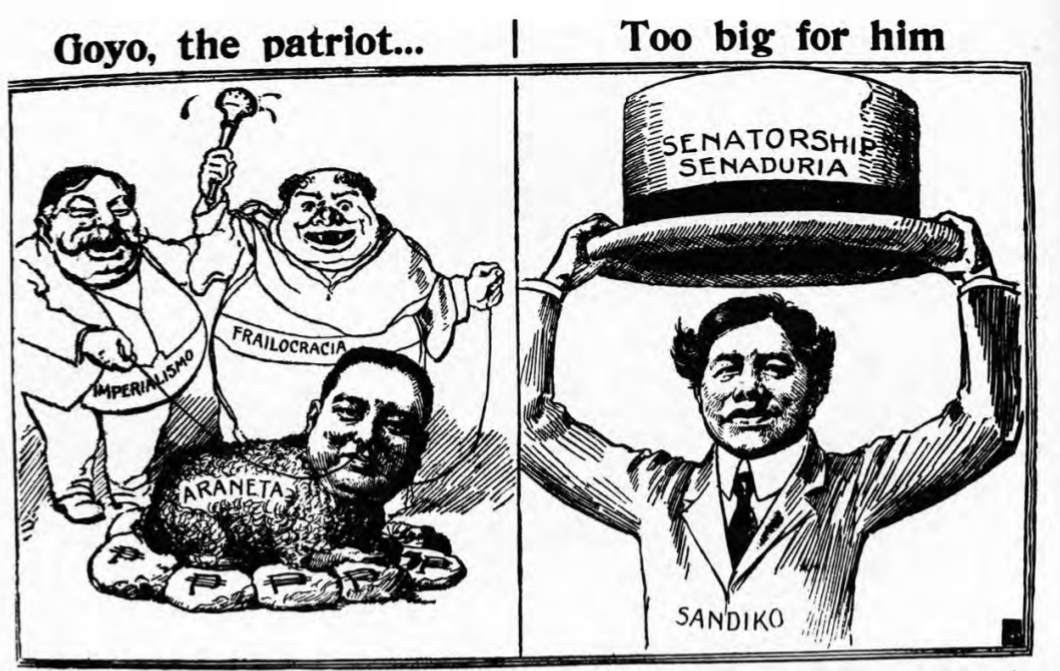
Cartoon from the newspaper The Independent, over which Sotto founded, mocking Gregorio Araneta (left) being an ally of Teodoro Sandiko (right) for the 1916 senatorial race, published September 16, 1916

In 1915, Sotto returned to Manila and begun work on a weekly journal he named The Independent. He issued a special edition of this journal in Paris in 1929. The news item prompted an American senator to introduce a resolution in the United States Senate to grant immediate independence to the Philippines.

The Independent was initially launched by Sotto to advocate reform within the Nacionalista Party. One of its notable criticism made by the newspaper was about Sergio Osmeña, leader of the Nacionalista Party, siding with Spain during the Philippine Revolution. The newspaper claimed that Osmeña dressed as a woman to escape the Filipino revolutionaries in Cebu City.

=== To Cebuano culture ===
Sotto is regarded as the Father of Cebuano language and letters. He is also considered the father of Cebuano journalism.

Sotto published Ang Suga, the first newspaper in Cebuano in 1900.

Sotto's play Paghigugma sa Yutang Natawhan (Love of Native Land), dramatized the Cebuano people's heroic struggle against Spanish feudal rule in the modern realist mode. He also wrote the first published Cebuano short story Maming in the maiden issue of Ang Suga.

He wrote, directed, and produced the first Cebuano play Elena, a play in three acts. It was first performed at the Teatro Junquera on May 18, 1902. The play established Sotto's reputation as a playwright.

The dedication of the play by the playwright reads, "To My Motherland, that you may have remembrance of the glorious Revolution that redeemed you from enslavement. I dedicate this humble play to you."

== Tributes to Sotto ==
Carlos P. Garcia, 8th President of the Philippines, a native of Bohol and fellow Visayan, said of Sotto: "Vicente Y. Sotto was a rock of Gibraltar in character because of the ruggedness of his conviction, the indomitability of his soul, the sublimity of his courage, and the depth of his faith in the ultimate triumph of justice. His knees no bending, his pen signed no retraction, his march saw no retreat, and his soul of steel knowns no surrender. He marshaled his efforts and used his influence to secure and safeguard for the press the fullest measure of freedom. By his death the country has lost a great patriot, his family has lost a loving and devote father, the Senate has lost an illustrious member..."

Southern Islands Hospital, the primary public medical care facility in southern Philippines, was renamed on May 21, 1992, to Vicente Sotto Memorial Medical Center, in honor of the late senator. A street inside the Cultural Center of the Philippines Complex in Pasay is named in his honor.

The University of San Carlos has established the Don Vicente Sotto Cebuano Studies grant as a contribution to the formation of a scholarly awareness of the various aspects of history, social life, language, and the arts of Cebu.

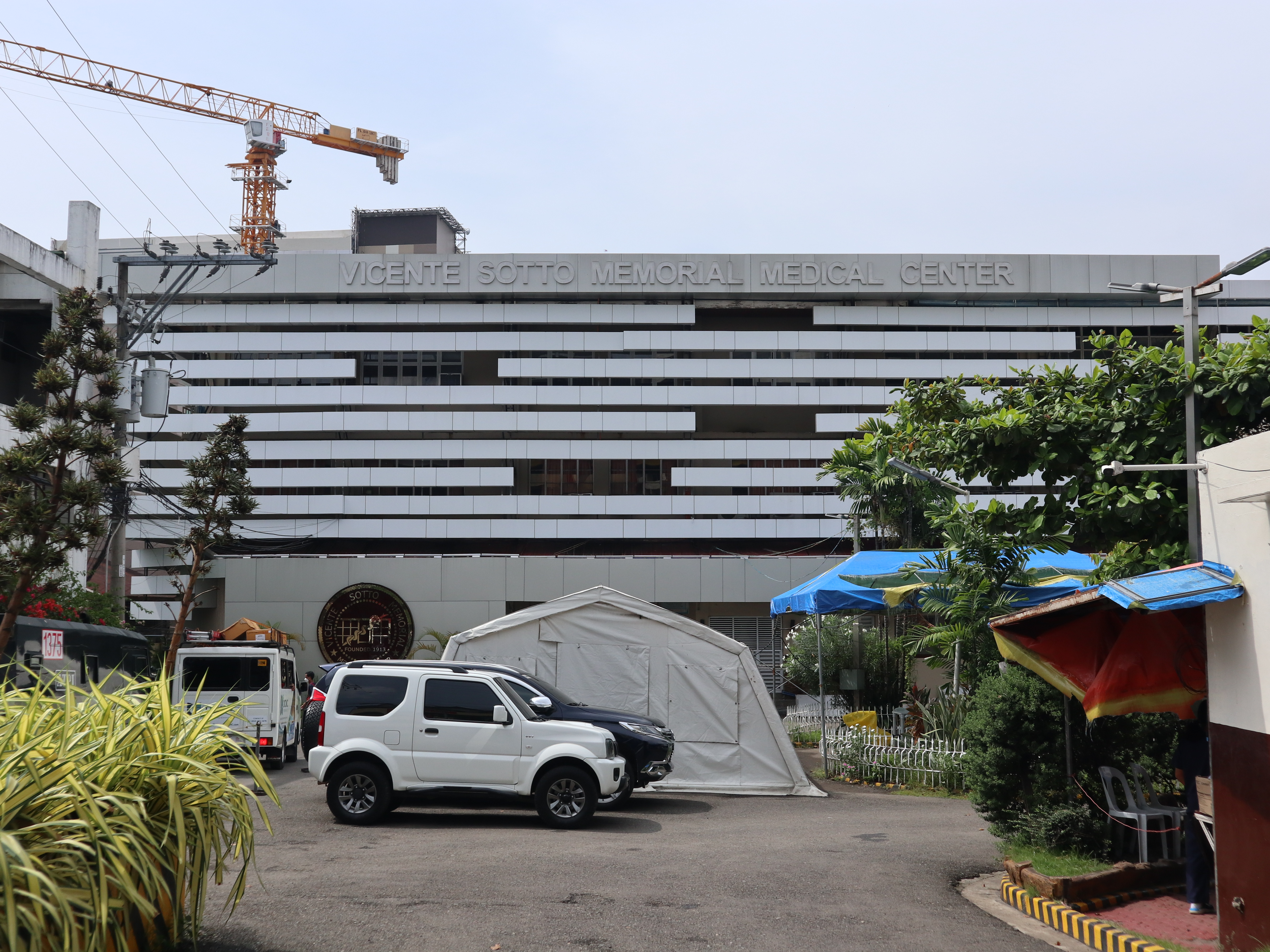
VSMMC taken in 2022

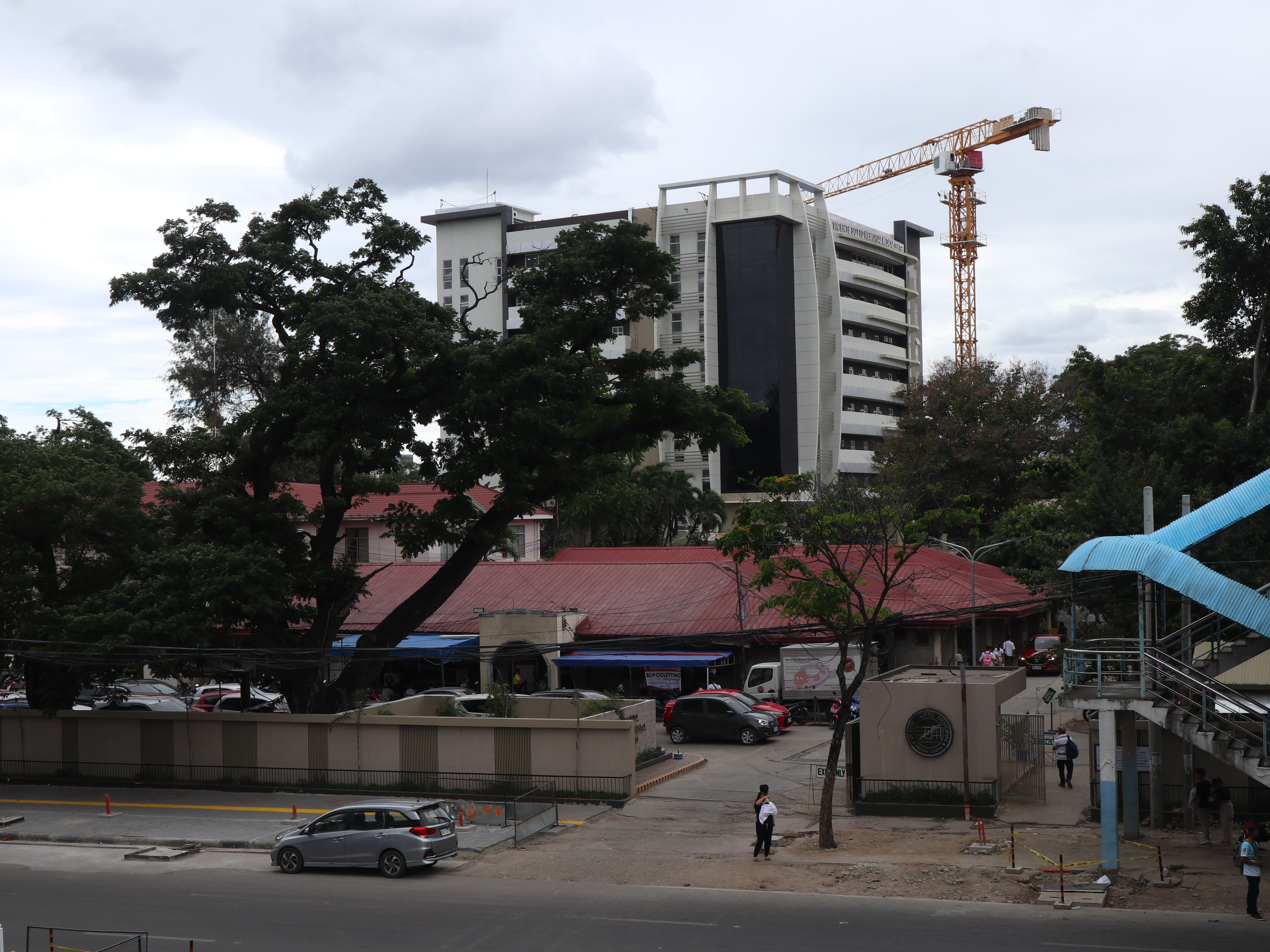
Vicente Sotto Memorial Medical Center (2024)

== Gallery ==
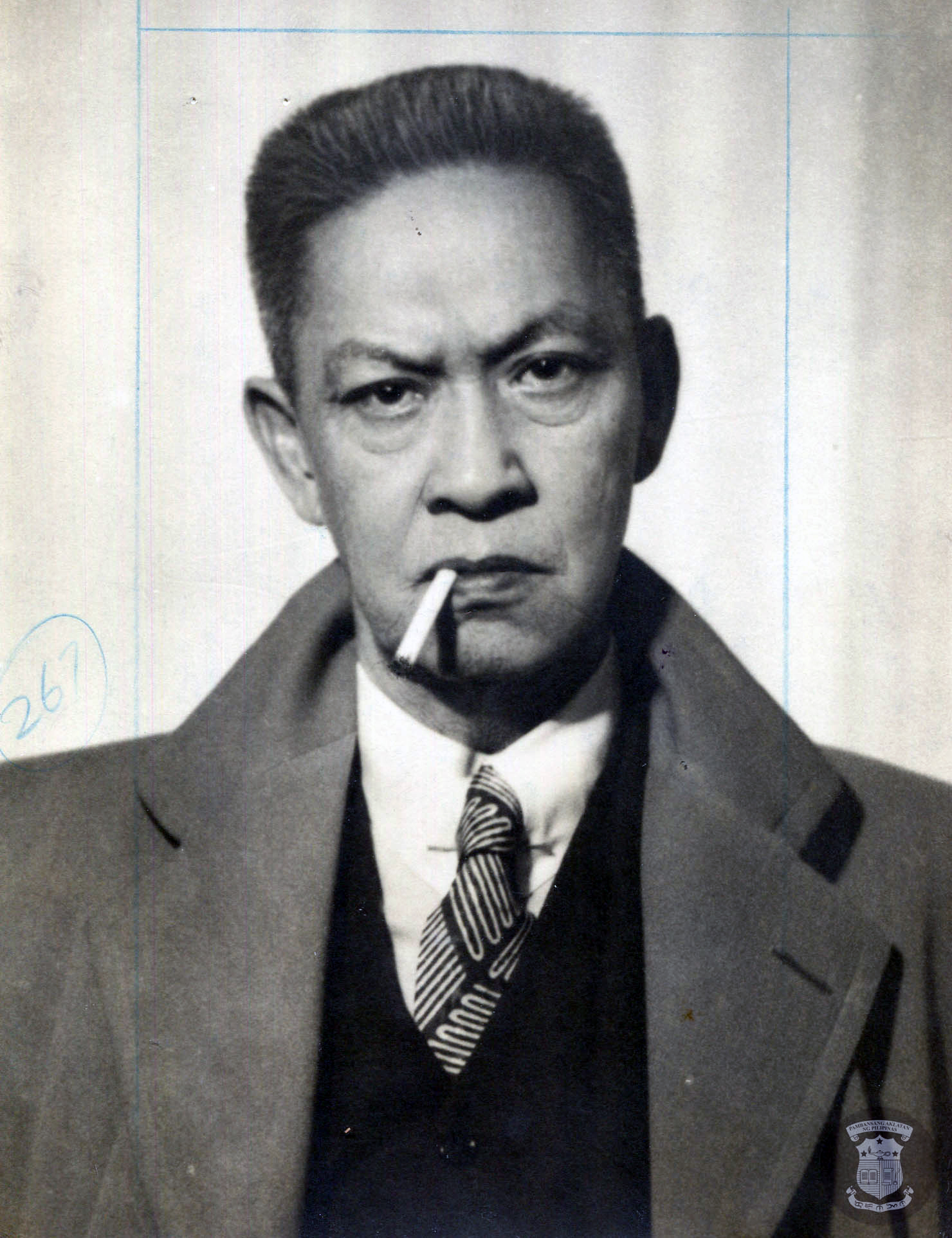
Portrait of Vicente Yap Sotto

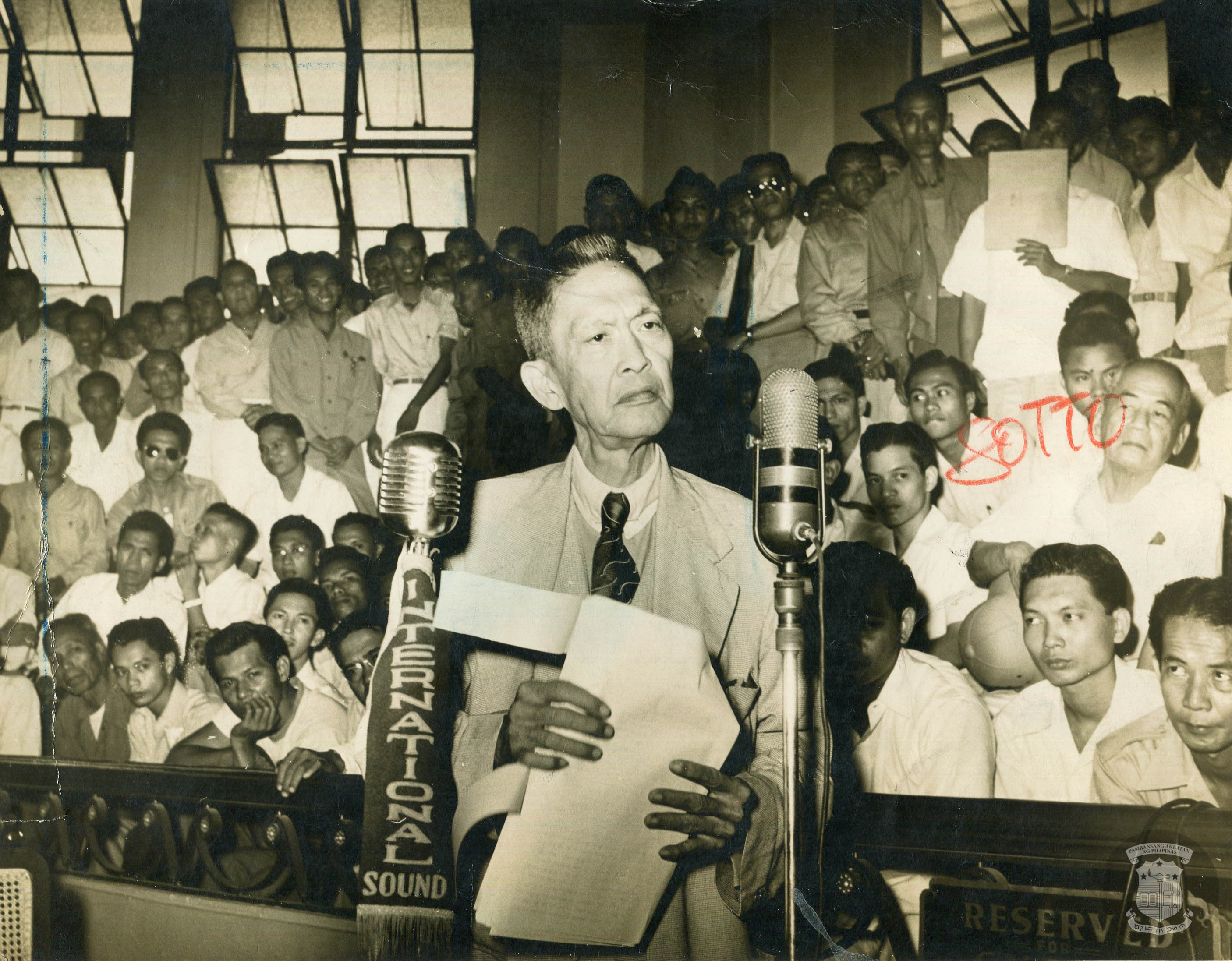
Vicente Sotto giving speech at the Philippine Senate

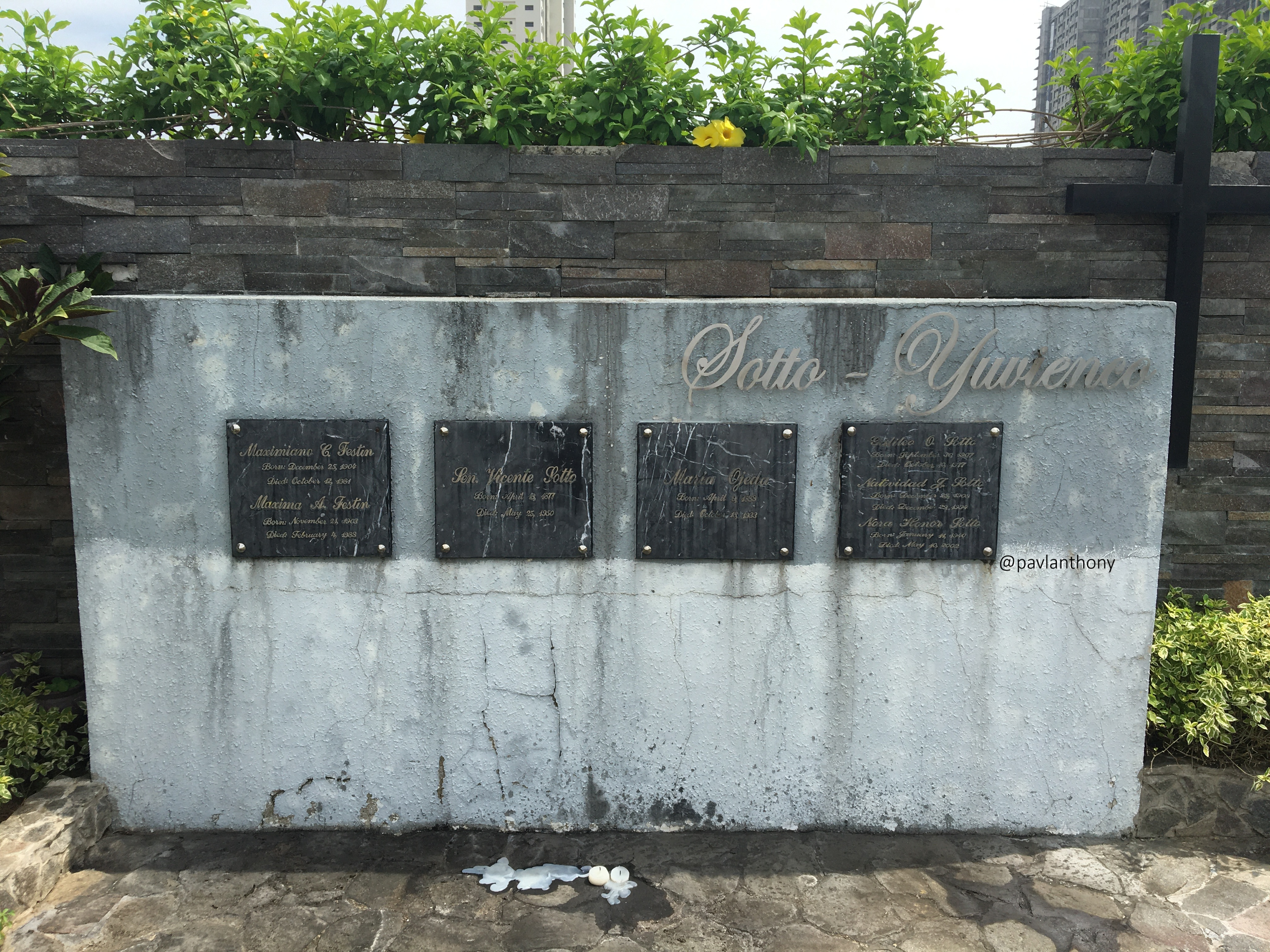
Senator Vicente Sotto's Tomb at Cebu Memorial Park

== See also ==
- List of Philippine legislators who died in office
