= Raymond Mendoza =

Filipino politician (born 1962)

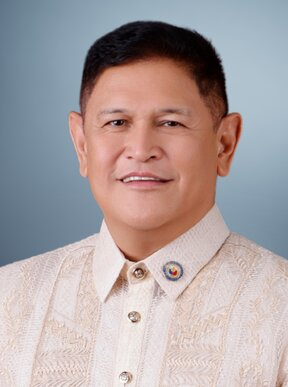
- Official portrait, 2025

Deputy Speaker of the House of Representatives of the Philippines
- Incumbent
- Assumed office July 25, 2022
- House Speaker: Martin Romualdez; Faustino "Bojie" Dy III

Member of the Philippine House of Representatives for the Trade Union Congress
- Incumbent
- Assumed office October 5, 2016
- In office July 30, 2013 – June 30, 2016
- In office April 21, 2009 – June 30, 2013

Assistant Secretary of Environment and Natural Resources
- In office 2001–2005
- President: Gloria Macapagal Arroyo

Director of the Philippine National Oil Company
- In office 2006 – 2009
Other positions held
President of the Veterans Foundation of the Philippines-Sons and Daughters Association
Incumbent
Assumed office
2019
President of the Trade Union Congress of the Philippines
Incumbent
Assumed office
2016

Personal details
- Born: Raymond Democrito Cañete Mendoza; July 7, 1962 (age 64) Cebu City, Philippines
- Party: Trade Union Congress
- Spouse: Emmylou Taliño (m. 2007)
- Children: 2
- Education: Immaculate Heart of Mary College (BA); University of San Carlos (LL.B); Ateneo de Manila University (MBA)

Raymond Democrito Cañete Mendoza (born July 7, 1962) is a Filipino lawyer, politician, labor leader, and maritime voluntary arbitrator who has served as the representative of the Trade Union Congress Party for seven intermittent terms since 2009. The longest-serving member of the House of Representatives of the Philippines, he has concurrently served as a deputy speaker since 2022 and the president of the Trade Union Congress of the Philippines, the largest national trade union center in the Philippines.

== Early life and education ==
Mendoza was born in Cebu City on July 7, 1962. His father is lawyer Democrito Mendoza, the founder of the Trade Union Congress of the Philippines and its associated labor unions. Mendoza studied in Vernon, British Columbia, Canada, from 1977 to 1978 as a Rotary exchange student for his secondary education. He graduated in 1983 at the Immaculate Heart of Mary College in Quezon City with a Bachelor of Arts in philosophy.

Mendoza pursued legal studies at the University of San Carlos in Cebu City, where he earned his Bachelor of Laws and Juris Doctor before passing the Philippine Bar Examinations in 1999. He then entered the Ateneo de Manila University where he earned a master's degree in Business Administration in 2002. Mendoza attended certificate courses administered by the International Labour Organization, completing the Financial Analysis Program for Labor Leaders in Turin, Italy, (1995) and Occupational Safety and Health Course also in Turin, Italy, (2000). He also accomplished the Advanced Leadership Training Course from the Singapore Institute of Labor in 1996. He is a certified rescue diver and has participated in marine protection efforts at the Nalusuan Island Marine Sanctuary.

== Labor activism ==
In 1995, Mendoza started work as an executive assistant of the Associated Labor Unions–TUCP. He became the National Vice President for Education and Information in 2001 and acquired the designation of National Vice President for National and International Affairs in 2008. Since April 2016, Mendoza has concurrently served as the President of the Trade Union Congress of the Philippines and the National Vice President for Mindanao Affairs of the Associated Labor Unions.

Mendoza has been serving as a delegate of the Philippines to the International Labour Conference of the International Labour Organization since 2000. In 2016, he served as the Head of the Workers' Delegation and in 2023, he served as both the Head of the Workers’ Delegation and the Head of the Congressional Delegation of the Philippines to the 111th Session of the ILC. He also serves as the Titular Member of the International Trade Union Confederation-Asia Pacific Regional Council. In 2023, Mendoza was reelected as Titular Member and elected as vice president of International Trade Union Confederation-Asia Pacific. In 2026, he was elected as the General Secretary of the ASEAN Trade Union Council (ASEAN-TUC) in Jakarta, Indonesia during the ASEAN-TUC Triennial General Assembly.

== Arroyo administration (2001–2009) ==
From 2001 to 2005, Mendoza served as the assistant secretary for policy, planning, and ecosystem research of the Legislative Liaison and Administrative Legal Services of the Department of Environment and Natural Resources. He was the head of the Philippines Governing Body in the United Nations Environment Program in Nairobi, Kenya in 2005. He was assistant secretary at the DENR.

From 2006 to 2009, he served as a director in the Philippine National Oil Company.

== House of Representatives of the Philippines (since 2009) ==
=== Elections ===
Mendoza has been able to serve continuously in the House of Representatives since 2009 due to a series of unique legal and procedural circumstances that interrupted several of his terms.

He first entered Congress during the 14th Congress (2007–2010), but only assumed office in April 2009 after the Supreme Court decision in Banat vs. Comelec recalculated the allocation of party-list seats. This ruling allowed additional groups, including the Trade Union Congress of the Philippines (TUCP), to secure representation despite not reaching the 2% vote threshold.

Because his entry came late in the 14th Congress, this period did not count as a full term. Mendoza subsequently won reelection in 2010, serving his first uninterrupted full term in the 15th Congress. However, internal disputes within TUCP delayed his proclamations in both the 16th (2013–2016) and 17th (2016–2019) Congresses, with Mendoza only assuming office months after the terms had begun. The Supreme Court has held in cases such as Tallado vs. Comelec that involuntary, temporary loss of office exempts an official from the constitutional three-term limit rule, so these partial terms were not counted against him.

As a result, Mendoza’s service in the 18th Congress (2019–2022) was treated as his first official full term under the constitutional limit. He was reelected to the 19th Congress (2022–2025) and proclaimed again for the 20th Congress (2025–2028), which is expected to be his third and final consecutive full term under the current rules.

=== Tenure ===
Mendoza was one of the principal authors of landmark legislation Pantawid Pamilyang Pilipino Program Act which institutionalizes 4Ps as a national poverty reduction strategy; the Magna Carta of the Poor that guarantees the rights of the poor and establishes the necessary government interventions for poverty alleviation, and the Department of Migrant Workers Act which establishes the DMW as the single home for all the needs and concerns of the Overseas Filipino Workers. He is also pushing for the passage of the Security of Tenure Bill which seeks to end the prevalent and abusive practice of labor-only contracting. He is also one of the principal authors of the House Bill 11376; ₱200 legislated wage hike bill, which sought to raise the daily minimum wage by ₱200 for nearly 5 million minimum wage earners in the private sector. This landmark legislation was successfully passed on third and final reading during the 19th Congress.

In the 15th Congress, he served as Chairperson of the Committee on Poverty Alleviation and as vice chairperson of the Committee on Labor and Employment and the Committee on People's Participation.

In the 16th Congress, he served as chairperson in the following committees: Committee on East ASEAN Growth Area from August 2013 to June 2014, Special Committee on Food Security from July to October 2015, and the Committee on Overseas Workers Affairs from October 2015 to June 2016. He also served as the Senior Vice Chairperson of the Ad Hoc Committee on the Bangsamoro Basic Law and the Vice Chairperson of the Committee on Labor and Employment. He was also a member of the Commission on Appointments from July 2014 to June 2015.

He was also a member of the Philippine delegation to the 36th ASEAN Inter-Parliamentary Assembly General Assembly held in Kuala Lumpur, Malaysia in September 2015 and to the 24th Association of Southeast Asian Nations Summit and the 10th Brunei Darussalam–Indonesia–Malaysia–Philippines East ASEAN Growth Area Summit in Nay Pyi Taw, Myanmar in May 2014.

In the 17th Congress, he served as the Chairperson of the Committee on Poverty Alleviation.

In the 18th Congress, he served as the Chairperson of the Committee on Overseas Workers Affairs and as Vice Chairperson of the Committee on Labor and Employment and the Committee on Civil Service and Professional Regulation.In 2019, he became the national president of the Veterans Foundation of the Philippines - Sons and Daughters Association.

In the 19th Congress, he served as a Deputy Speaker of the House of Representatives.

In the 20th Congress, he was re-elected as a Deputy Speaker of the House of Representatives and will serve his 7th consecutive term. Mendoza will be term-limited in 2028 after serving three uninterrupted terms.

In November 2022, Deputy Speaker Mendoza served as Head of the Philippine Delegation to the 43rd AIPA General Assembly in Phnom Penh, Cambodia. He was also designated Head of the Congressional Delegation to the 146th Inter-Parliamentary Union Assembly held in Manama, Bahrain, in March 2023. Mendoza again led the Philippine Delegation to the 44th AIPA General Assembly in Jakarta, Indonesia, in June 2023, and to the 45th AIPA General Assembly in Vientiane, Lao People’s Democratic Republic, the following year. In 2025, he headed the Philippine Delegation to the 46th AIPA General Assembly in Kuala Lumpur, Malaysia. During that assembly, he formally accepted the transfer of office as President of the 47th AIPA General Assembly on behalf of H.E. Faustino “Bojie” G. Dy III, Speaker of the House of Representatives of the Philippines.

== Personal life ==
Mendoza is married to North Cotabato Governor Emmylou Taliño-Mendoza. He is the father of the Representative of the 3rd District of Cotabato and Assistant Majority Leader Maria Alana Samantha Santos, and Emilio Ramon Mendoza. Mendoza is also a military reservist with the rank of major in the Reserve Force of the Philippine Army.

== Electoral history ==
Electoral history of Raymond Mendoza
Year	Office	Party	Votes received				Result
Year	Office	Party	Total	%	P.	Swing	Result
2007	Representative (Party-list)	TUCP	162,678	1.06%	33rd	—N/a	Won
2010	Representative (Party-list)	TUCP	245,031	0.81%	31st	-0.25	Won
2013	Representative (Party-list)	TUCP	369,286	1.33%	23rd	+0.52	Won (Note: Delayed Mendoza's 2nd uninterrupted term due to an internal dispute; assumed office on July 2013.)
2016	Representative (Party-list)	TUCP	467,275	1.44%	23rd	+0.11	Won (Note: Delayed Mendoza's 3rd uninterrupted term due to an internal dispute; assumed office again on October 2016.)
2019	Representative (Party-list)	TUCP	256,059	0.92%	33rd	-0.52	Won
2022	Representative (Party-list)	TUCP	260,779	0.72%	50th	-0.20	Won
2025	Representative (Party-list)	TUCP	314,814	0.79%	39th	+0.07	Won
