= Silot Lagoon =

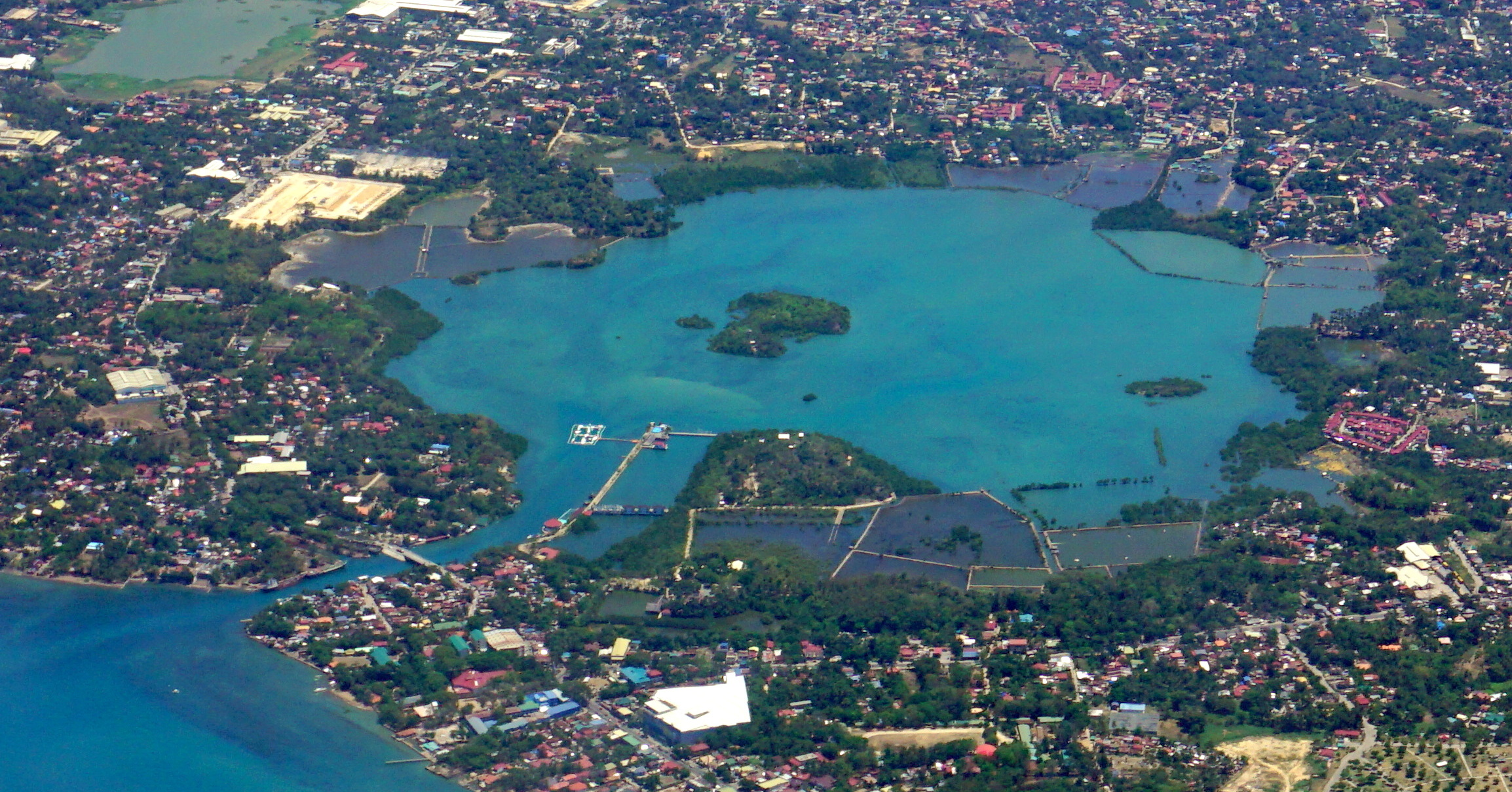

- Location within Metro Cebu Location within Visayas
- Coordinates: 10°23′30″N 123°59′40″E
- Type: Lagoon
- Primary outflows: Camotes Sea
- Basin countries: Philippines
- Max. length: 1.4 km (0.87 mi)
- Max. width: 1.2 km (0.75 mi)
- Settlements: Liloan, Cebu

Silot Lagoon (more widely and erroneously known as Silot Bay) is a shallow body of water located in the municipality of Liloan, Cebu, the Philippines. It is a lagoon surrounded by mangroves, connected to the Camotes Sea by a narrow outlet called the Liloan River. The lagoon has depths of between 1 and 2 feet (0.30 and 0.61 m) and is situated just south of Liloan's poblacion. It is bounded to the east by the village of Catarman, to the west by Yati, and to the south by Tayud. It has sandbars near its outlet at the Liloan River.

== Geography ==
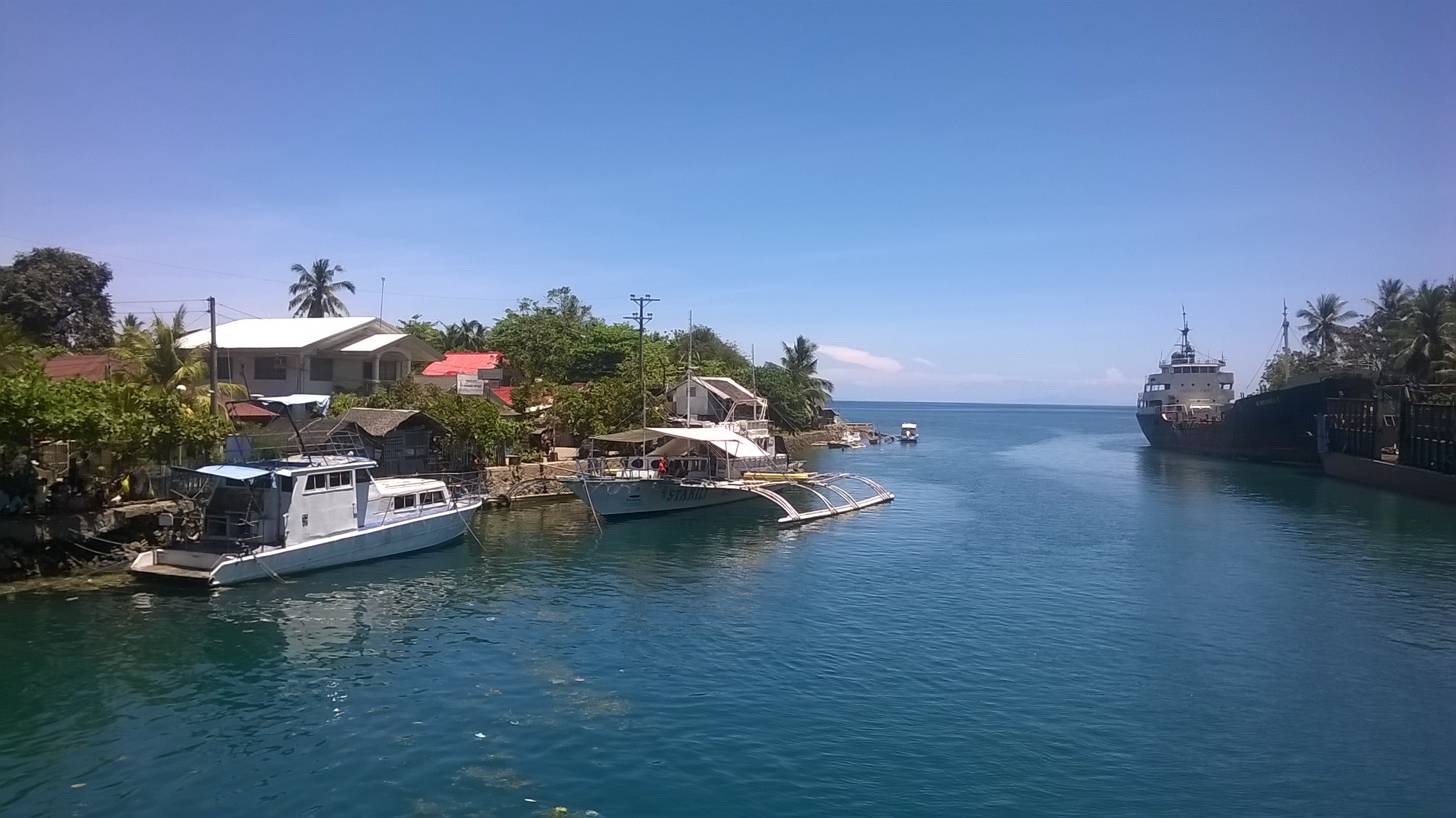
Silot Lagoon towards the direction of the Camotes Sea.

Silot Lagoon is roughly circular in shape and measures around 1.4 kilometers (0.87 mi) long and 1.2 kilometers (0.75 mi) wide. Its waters flows to the Camotes Sea through a short channel known as the Liloan River. The waters in the river's mouth is prone to swirling current. The lagoon is surrounded by a ridge around 25 meters (82 ft) high above sea level. It separates two of the town's barangays which are connected through a bridge. The name of Liloan town, reportedly came from the lagoon's current; from lilo or the Cebuano word for whirlpool.

In 2000, the Department of Environment and Natural Resources' (DENR) Environmental Management Bureau gave Silot Lagoon an "SB" classification, which meant that the lagoon host "fishery water suitable for commercial propagation of shellfish and intended as spawning areas for milkfish and similar species"

== Use ==
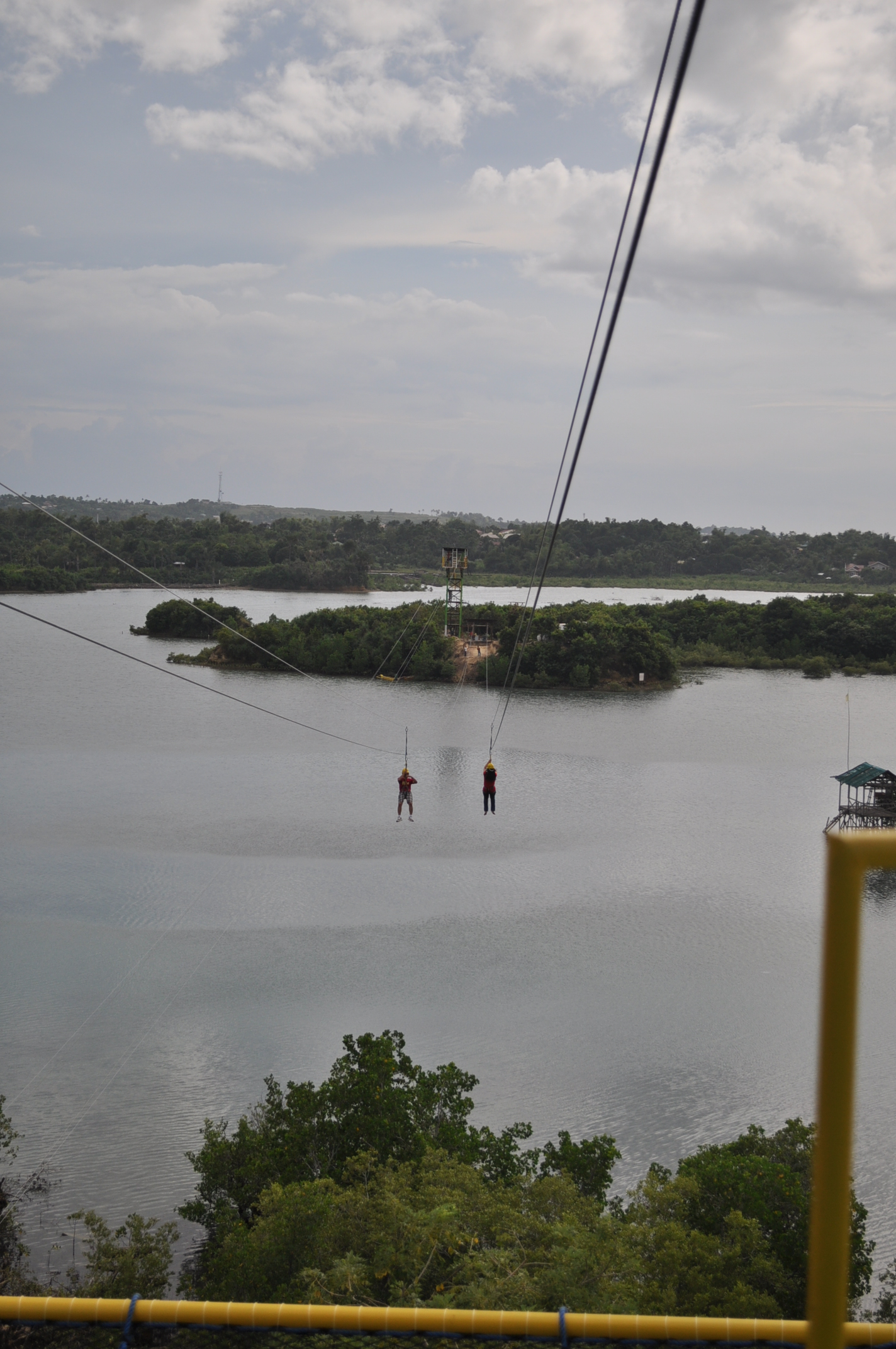
A zipline in Papa Kit's Marina and Fishing Lagoon, which crosses over the lagoon's waters.

The lagoon is traditional fishing grounds for tilapia, groupers (Lapu-Lapu) and shrimps. It is also frequented by bathers. Several resorts can be found along Silot Lagoon's coastline; including Silot Beach Resort, commonly known as Pilapil Park, and Papa Kit's Marina and Fishing Lagoon. The latter is owned by Democrito Mendoza.

=== Property dispute ===
The 92 hectares (230 acres) property of trade union leader Demócrito Mendoza in Silot Lagoon has been a subject of local dispute. Mendoza's first commercial involvement in the Silot Lagoon was in 1954, when he secured a fishpond permit. Taking advantage of President Ferdinand Marcos's order to the Bureau of Forestry to release all fishpond areas to the Bureau of Lands as "alienable and disposable" in 1967, he was able to acquire a property in the lagoon in 1974 with then-Liloan Mayor César Bugtai opposing his bid. The Department of Environment and Natural Resources in 1990 attempted to retrieve Mendoza's property for the government through legal means, but the Supreme Court in 2007 ruled in favor of Mendoza.

In 2014, Mendoza erected fencing around his property in the lagoon, which local fishers complained has denied them access to the lagoon's fishing grounds, and alleged that the fencing was made ahead of developing the enclosed property into a water park. The structure was shortly demolished following protests.
