= Trade Union Congress Party =

Political party in the Philippines

- — Philippine partylist —
- Ideology: Trade unionism Laborism
- Colors: Blue

Current representation (20th Congress)
- Seats in the House of Representatives: 1 / 3 (Out of 63 party-list seats)
- Representative(s): Raymond Mendoza

Website
- tucp.org.ph

Trade Union Congress Party is a party-list in the Philippines, set up by the Trade Union Congress of the Philippines as its electoral wing. The party contested the 2004 legislative elections, mustering 201,396 votes nationwide (1.58%). The list failed to win any seat. The Supreme Court declared TUCP, as well as a few other party-list organizations, as winners in the 2007 legislative elections by virtue of the Philippine Constitution.

The party supported Bongbong Marcos and Sara Duterte during the 2022 presidential election, citing consultation meetings with their members across the Philippines, "an overwhelming majority decision in all caucuses."

Raymond Democrito Cañete Mendoza is currently serving as the representative of the Trade Union Congress of the Philippines (TUCP) Party-list and is currently one of the Deputy Speakers in the House of Representatives. He is TUCP's representative to the 14th, 15th, 16th, 17th, 18th, and 19th Congresses of the Republic of the Philippines.

== Electoral result ==
Election	Congress	Votes	%	Secured Seats	Party-List Seats	1st Representatives	2nd Representatives	3rd Representatives
2001	12th 2001–2004	103,273	0.68%	0 / 3	52	Failed to secure representation in Congress		
2004	13th 2004–2007	201,396	1.58%	0 / 3	52	Failed to secure representation in Congress		
2007	14th 2007–2010	162,647	1.02%	1 / 3	53	Raymond Mendoza (2009–2010 (Note: Proclaimed and assumed office on 21 April 2009.))	—N/a	—N/a
2010	15th 2010–2013	245,031	0.82%	1 / 3	57	Raymond Mendoza	—N/a	—N/a
2013	16th 2013–2016	368,883	1.35%	1 / 3	59	Raymond Mendoza (2013–2016 (Note: Proclaimed and assumed office on 30 July 2013.))	—N/a	—N/a
2016	17th 2016–2019	467,275	1.44%	1 / 3	59	Raymond Mendoza (2016–2019 (Note: Proclaimed and assumed office on 5 October 2016.))	—N/a	—N/a
2019	18th 2019–2022	256,059	0.92%	1 / 3	61	Raymond Mendoza	—N/a	—N/a
2022	19th 2022–2025	260,779	0.71%	1 / 3	63	Raymond Mendoza	—N/a	—N/a
2025	20th 2025–2028	314,814	0.75%	1 / 3	63	Raymond Mendoza	—N/a	—N/a
Note: A party-list representation in the House of Representatives of the Philippines, can win a maximum of three seats in the House of Representatives. Took part in 2001 as the Trade Union Congress of the Philippines.

== Party-list nominee ==
Mendoza is TUCP's Representative to the 14th, 15th, 16th, 17th, 18th, and 19th Congresses of the Republic of the Philippines.

Mendoza was one of the principal authors of the Pantawid Pamilyang Pilipino Program (4Ps) Act, which institutionalizes 4Ps as a national poverty reduction strategy; the Magna Carta of the Poor that guarantees the rights of the poor and establishes the necessary government interventions for poverty alleviation, and the Department of Migrant Workers (DMW) Act, which establishes the DMW as the single home for all the needs and concerns of the Overseas Filipino Workers (OFWs). He is also pushing for the passage of the Security of Tenure Bill, which seeks to end the prevalent and abusive practice of labor-only contracting.

In the 15th Congress, he served as chair of the Committee on Poverty Alleviation and as vice chairperson of the Committee on Labor and Employment and the Committee on People's Participation.

In the 16th Congress, he served as chairperson in the following committees: Committee on East ASEAN Growth Area (EAGA) from August 2013 to June 2014, Special Committee on Food Security from July to October 2015, and the Committee on Overseas Workers Affairs from October 2015 to June 2016. He also served as the Senior Vice Chairperson of the Ad Hoc Committee on the Bangsamoro Basic Law and the vice chairperson of the Committee on Labor and Employment. He was also a member of the Commission on Appointments from July 2014 to June 2015.

In the 17th Congress, he served as the chairperson of the Committee on Poverty Alleviation.

In the 18th Congress, he served as the chairperson of the Committee on Overseas Workers Affairs and as vice chairperson of the Committee on Labor and Employment and the Committee on Civil Service and Professional Regulation.

He was also a member of the Philippine delegation to the 36th ASEAN Inter-Parliamentary Assembly (AIPA) General Assembly held in Kuala Lumpur, Malaysia in September 2015 and to the 24th Association of Southeast Asian Nations (ASEAN) Summit and the 10th Brunei Darussalam–Indonesia–Malaysia–Philippines East ASEAN Growth Area (BIMP-EAGA) Summit in Nay Pyi Taw, Myanmar in May 2014.

Currently, in the 19th Congress, he serves as a Deputy Speaker of the House of Representatives.
