= Democrito Mendoza =

Filipino Visayan lawyer and trade union leader

Democrito "Kito" Tolo Mendoza
- Born: July 31, 1923; Liloan, Cebu, Philippines
- Died: January 12, 2016 (aged 92); Cebu City, Philippines
- Education: University of the Visayas
- Occupation: Lawyer
- Organization: Associated Labor Union Trade Union Congress of the Philippines ASEAN Trade Union Council
- Known for: Trade Unionism Champion of Filipino workers' rights
- Movement: Philippine labor movement
- Board member of: Vimcontu Broadcasting Corporation Chairman Vice-Chair Emeritus of the Philippine Veterans Bank Regional Vice President of the Veterans Federation of the Philippines
- Awards: 1998 Labor Leader of the Year Order of the Golden Heart Presidential Merit Award
- Honours: United States Army Gold Cross

Democrito "Kito" Tolo Mendoza (July 31, 1923 – January 12, 2016) was a Filipino Visayan lawyer and trade union leader from Cebu, Philippines. He was considered one of the founders of the country's labor movement and champion of Filipino workers' rights in the country being the founder of Associated Labor Union. In the international scene, he founded the ASEAN Trade Union Council. In 2005, he was awarded Presidential Merit Award by President Gloria Macapagal Arroyo.

== Early life ==
Democrito Mendoza was born in Barangay Poblacion, Liloan, Cebu on July 31, 1923. He was the youngest of ten children of Manuel Mendoza y Pepito (March 23, 1883, Liloan, Cebu - October 18, 1961, Cebu City) and Magdalena Tolo y Cañete (July 22, 1881, Liloan, Cebu - May 21, 1971, Cebu City). He was baptized on August 4, 1923 at San Fernando El Rey Parish in Liloan by Victoriano Rallos, with Lázaro Ramas as his godfather. He acquired a law degree at the University of the Visayas in 1952.

== World War II ==
During the outbreak of World War II, he joined the resistance movement against the Japanese and became a guerilla fighter, which earned him distinction as a bemedalled Filipino veteran. The United States Army's America Division awarded him the Gold Cross for his military service as an officer of the US Army Forces in the Far East that he demonstrated in Cebu against enemy forces during the liberation campaign between March 26 to April 19, 1945. He was also a military reservist in the Armed Forces of the Philippines with the rank of colonel.

== Trade union ==
=== Labor leader ===
After the war, he advocated for trade unionism and became one of the founding fathers of the labor movement in the Philippines. Promoting core labor standards, he called for the observance of workers' rights and welfare including the right to organize, to bargain collectively, and to strike. He also called for the ban on the use of child labor. As a labor leader, he led the push for restructuring the Philippine economy to create new job opportunities and protect workers from the rise of contractualization.

=== ALU ===
He was the founder of the Associated Labor Union (ALU) in 1954, becoming its president for a long time, by leading workers in Cebu ports. ALU would become the biggest labor union in the country. Its major victory was the collective bargaining agreement brokered between the Visayan Cebu Terminal Co. and its workers in 1957, of which the workers began a strike a year earlier.

=== TUCP ===
In addition, he was also the founder of the Trade Union Congress of the Philippines (TUCP) that was established in 1975 and led Visayas-Mindanao Conference of Trade Unions. He was TUCP president for 38 years until his retirement in 2011.

=== ASEAN Trade Union Council ===
He worked for the improvement of labor conditions both domestically and internationally. He was known as the secretary general of the ASEAN Trade Union Council. He was its founder in 1983, creating the organization with the objective of forwarding the rights of association workers. Together with other Filipino labor leaders, he called for the industrialized and oil-rich nations to a "rational approach" amidst the escalating oil price hikes.

=== International forums ===
From 1975 to 1996, he was a member of the governing body of the International Labour Organization (ILO) in Geneva. He represented the country and the Filipino workers as board member of the International Confederation of Trade Unions (presently the ITUC) in 1975 until 1983, as well as the ILO International Centre for Advanced Technical and Vocational Training in Turin, Italy from 1968 to 1996. Also, he was the country's or the workers' group's delegate to the ILO annual conferences that occurred between the 1961 and 2005.

=== Social Security Commission ===
From 1968 to 1986, he was a representative on behalf of labor issues on the Social Security Commission, as well as labor adviser during the term of then President Corazon Aquino. He pioneered the establishment of labor centers in Quezon City, Cebu, Cagayan de Oro, and Davao City.

=== OPASCOR ===
Mendoza was key in transforming the National Arrastre and Stevedoring Corporation into a workers' enterprise called the Oriental Port and Allied Services Corporation (OPASCOR). It was also the result of Corazon Aquino's decision to privatize government corporations. The operator at the Cebu International Port responsible for overseeing shipments and granted with a 10-year contract by the Philippine Ports Authority on January 9, 1990, to exclusively service foreign vessels, it is the only company in the country that is owned 100 percent by its workers.

In 2002, then Senator John Osmeña initiated a legislative inquiry into the alleged diversion of company's funds into Mendoza's family-owned businesses. The company sought the suspension of the investigation and filed a suit at the Supreme Court stating that the Senate had exceeded its jurisdiction and was committing grave abuse of authority.

== Corporate boards ==
He was the chairman of Vimcontu Broadcasting Corporation that owns and operates the radio station DYLA. Also, he was the vice-chair emeritus of the Philippine Veterans Bank and regional vice president of the Veterans Federation of the Philippines.

== Later years ==
In 2008, he authored an autobiography entitled "Shapes of Memory".

He died in Cebu City on January 12, 2016 at the age of 92. Then Senate President Franklin Drilon said that Mendoza would be remembered as a "principled and relentless champion of the Filipino working class." The International Transport Workers' Federation (ITF) general secretary Steve Cotton also commented, "Democrito was a courageous man who dedicated his life to serving the working people of the Philippines." Moreover, the Senate also passed Resolution No. 114 on February 1, 2016 "expressing sympathy and sincere condolence of the Senate" on his demise.

== Awards and recognition ==
The House Resolution No. 1051 filed in April 2015 in his honor by Benguet Representative Ronald Cosalan and to give congressional recognition for his work in advancing the country's labor movement and defending and upholding the interest of Filipino working class stated, "Mendoza's unwavering work, advocacy, inspiration and his love for the workingmen has challenged not only the Philippine government but also governments around the world." In June 2015, the House of Representatives approved the resolution.

Mendoza had been the recipients of several awards, including three presidential recognition. In 1998, then President Fidel V. Ramos conferred upon him the Labor Leader of the Year. Later, President Gloria Macapagal Arroyo awarded him with the Order of the Golden Heart in 2002 and the Presidential Merit Award in 2005.

== Publication ==
- Shapes of Memory: Memoir of a Freedom Fighter and Trade Unionist, Associated Labor Unions - TUCP/Oriental Port and OPASCOR, 2007
