= Bagacay Point Lighthouse =

Lighthouse in Cebu, Philippines

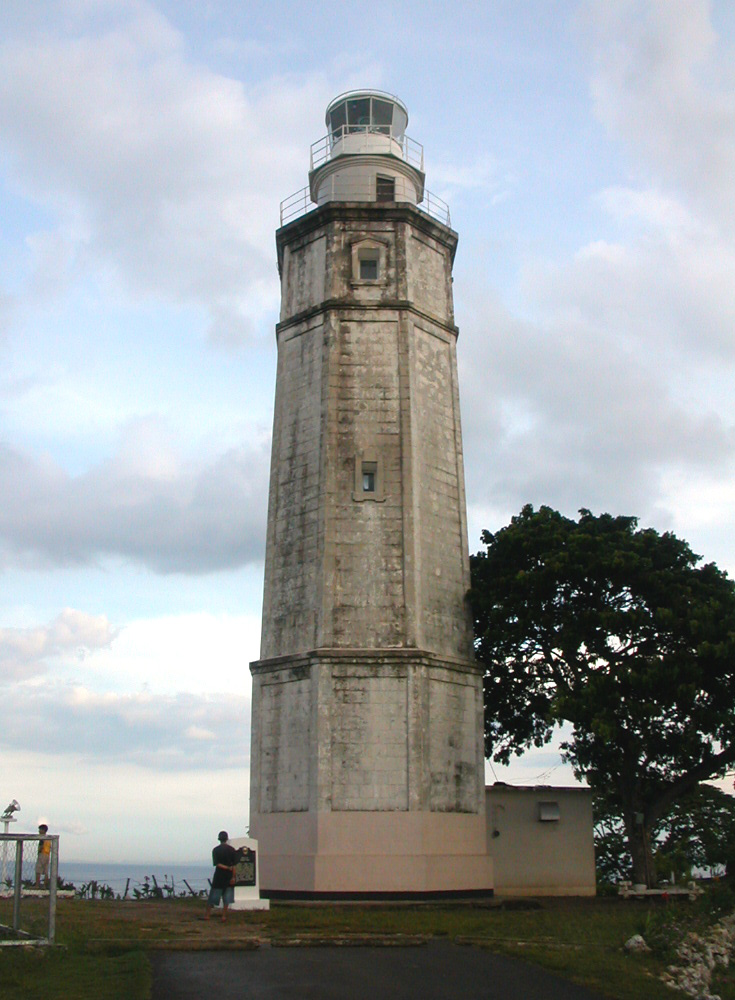
- The lighthouse in 2006
- Location: Liloan, Cebu, Philippines
- Coordinates: 10°22′59.4″N 124°01′06.8″E

Tower
- Constructed: 1857 (first); 1874 (second)
- Foundation: masonry
- Construction: concrete and stone tower (current) stone tower (second)
- Height: 22 metres (72 ft) (current)
- Shape: octagonal tower with balcony and lantern (current) cylindrical tower with double balcony and lantern (second)
- Markings: unpainted tower, white lantern (current)
- Heritage: National Historical Landmark
- Fog signal: none

Light
- First lit: 1908 (current)
- Deactivated: 1908 (second)
- Focal height: 44.5 metres (146 ft) (current)
- Lens: 3rd order Fresnel lens
- Range: 20 nmi (37 km; 23 mi)
- Characteristic: Fl W 5s.

Bagacay Point Lighthouse is an active lighthouse in Liloan, Cebu, in the Philippines.

== Description ==
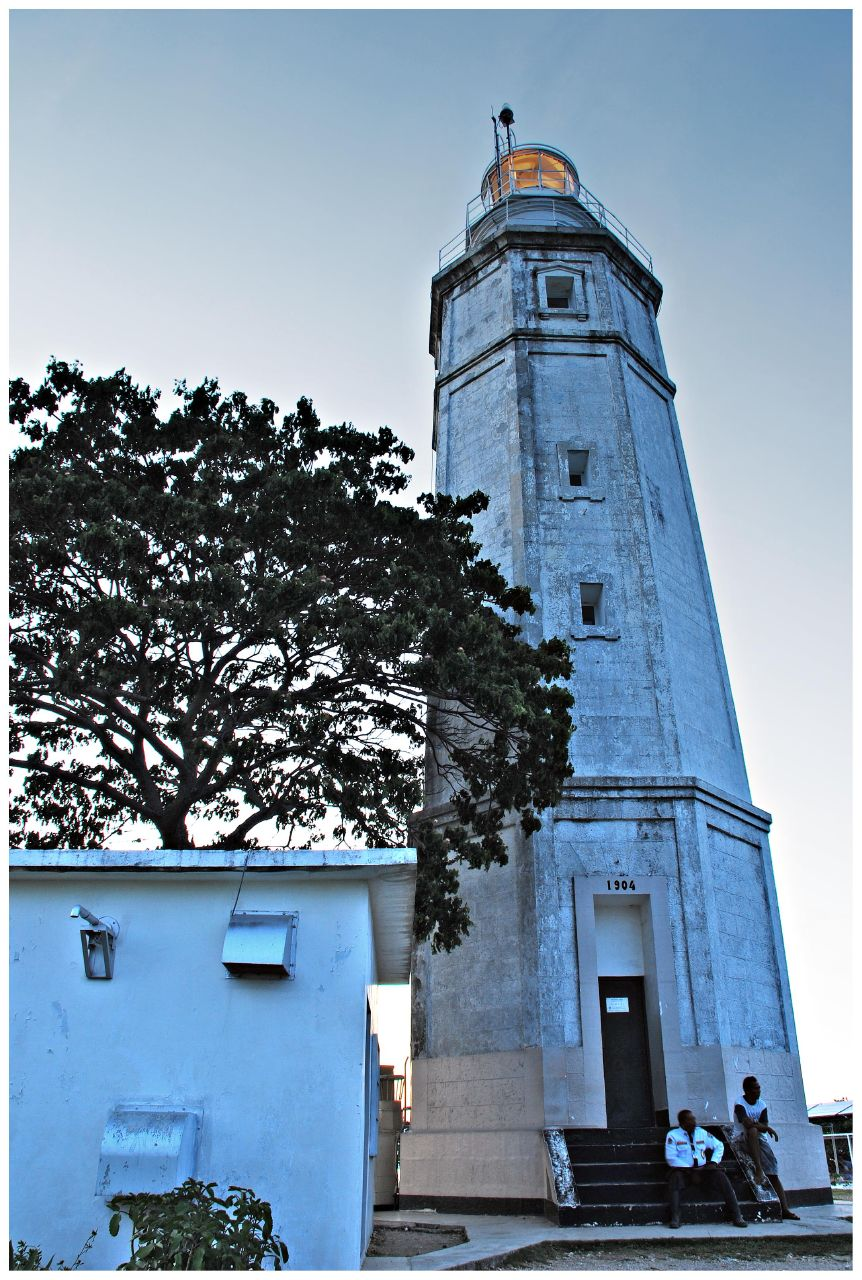

The lighthouse tower stands at a height of 172 feet (52 m) in an uphill area overlooking the Mactan Channel. It sits on an elevated 5,000-square-metre (54,000 sq ft) government property. With a focal plane of 146 feet (45 m), the third-order flashing light was first lit on 1 April 1905. The present octagonal tower is all masonry and painted white. The landmark was built by virtue of an executive order issued on 28 July 1903 by William Howard Taft, the first American Governor-General of the Philippines who came to the country in 1900 as president of the Philippine Commission. The point light was originally established in 1857 by the ruling Spanish Government.

For over 100 years, this lighthouse has provided guiding light to mariners, navigators and fishermen from coastal towns in northern Cebu. It has been a favorite subject of many painters and photographers for its notable architectural design.

All navigational aids in the Philippines are managed by the Philippine Coast Guard.

== Gallery ==
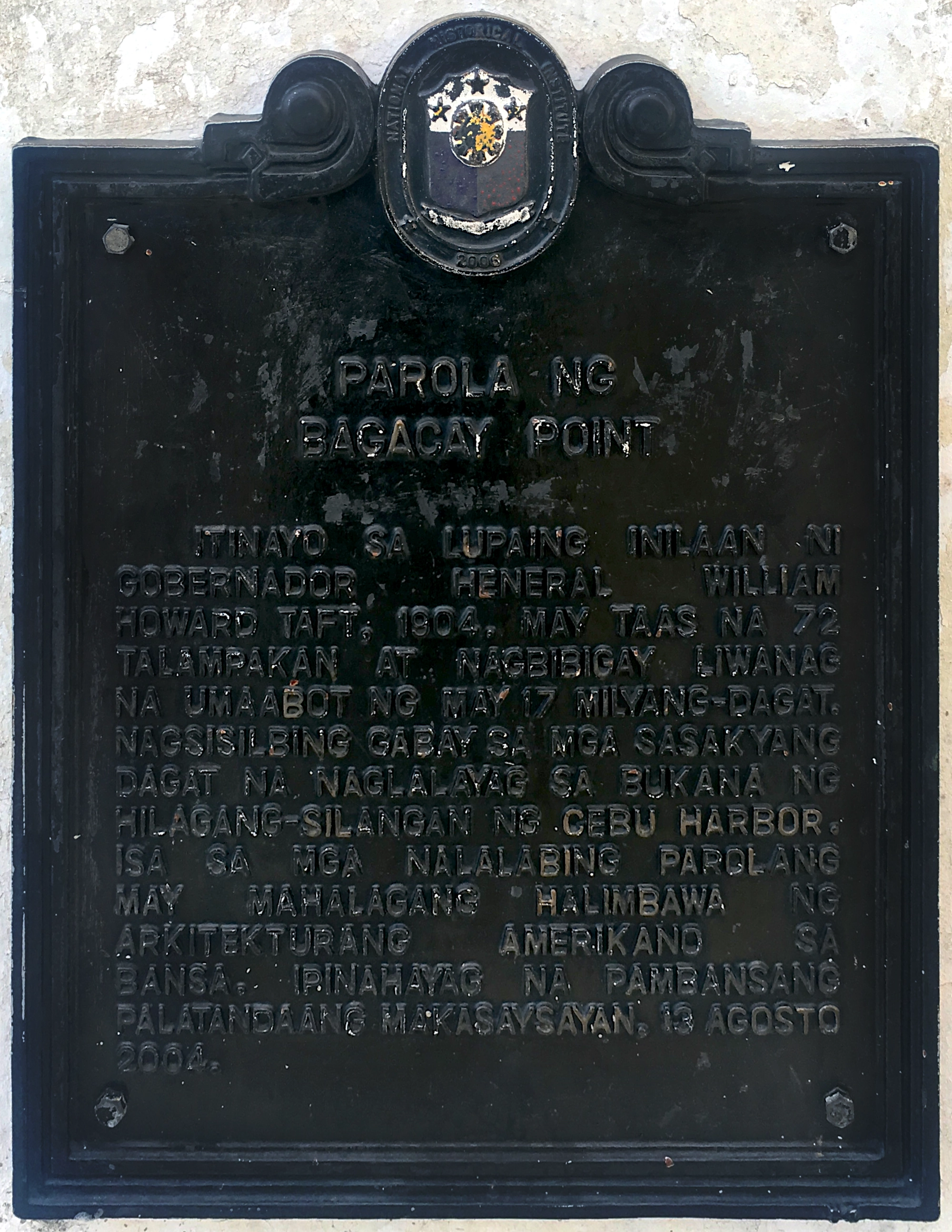
Liloan Lighthouse Historical Marker

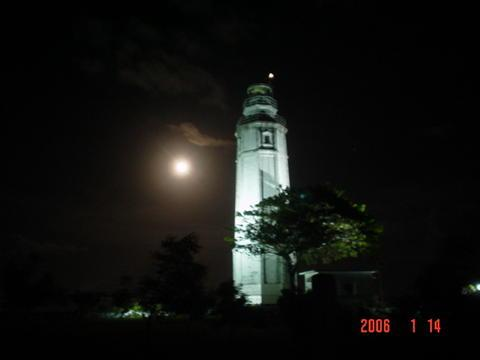
Liloan Lighthouse at night

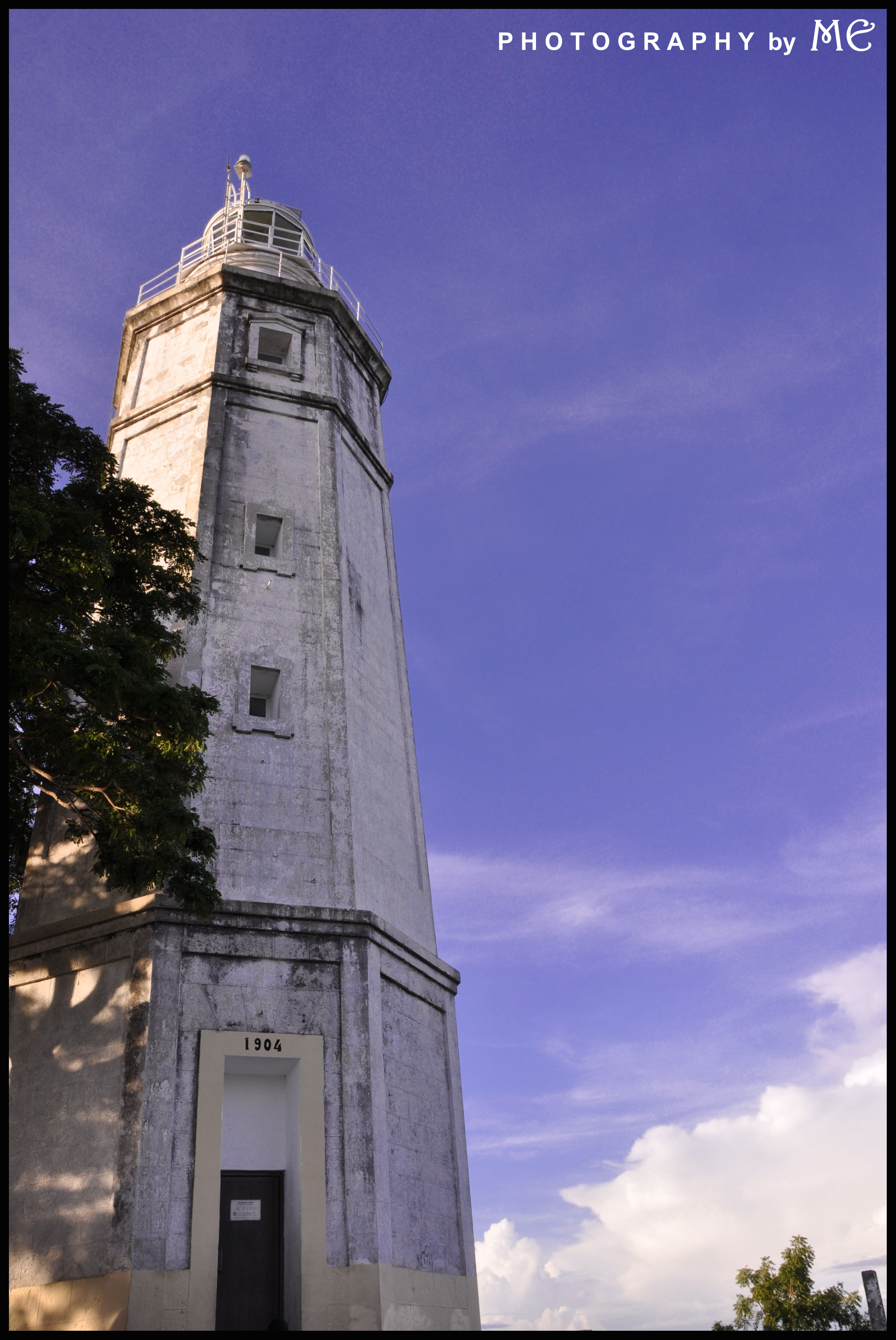
Liloan Lighthouse in 2009

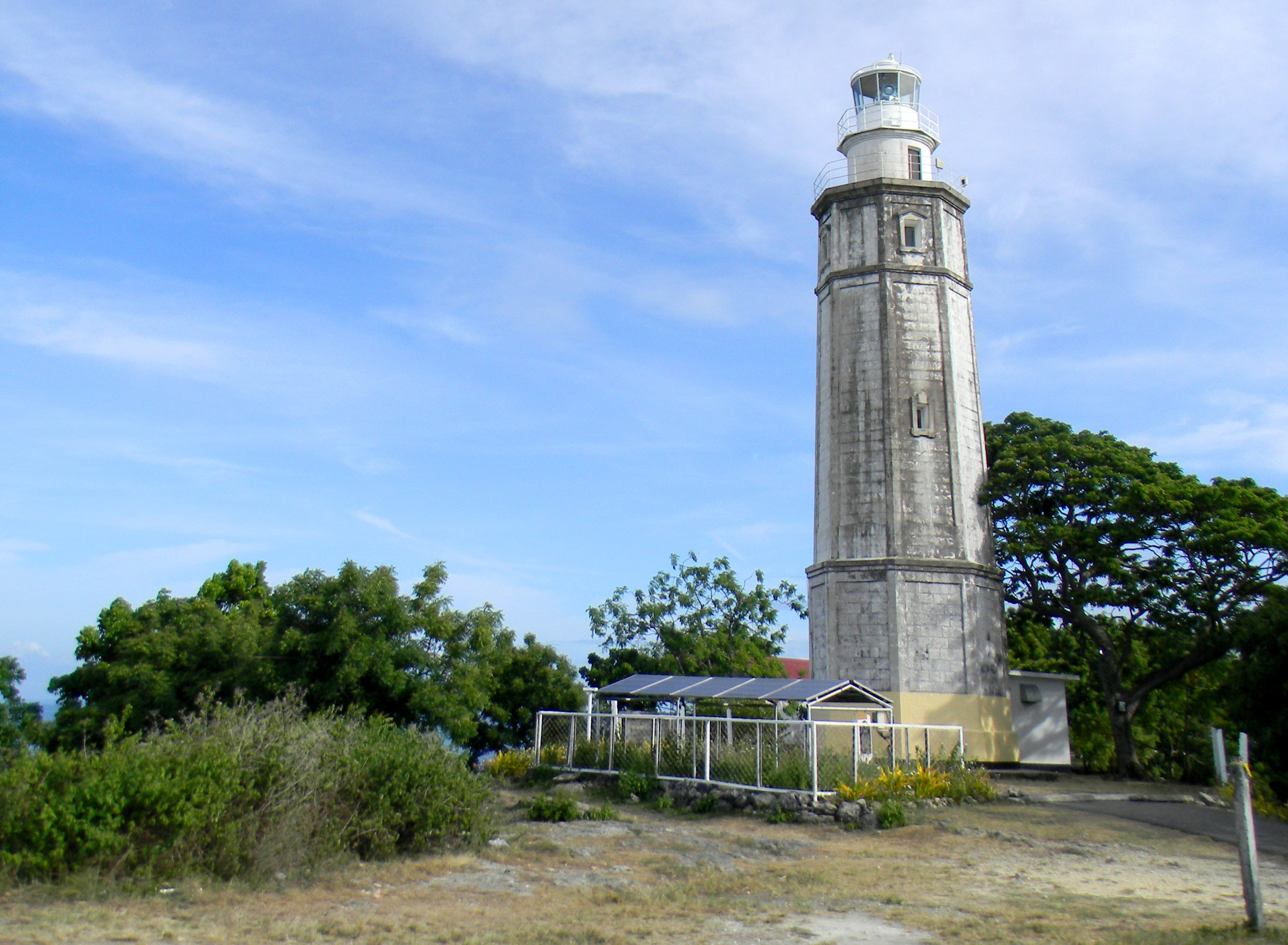
Bagacay Point Lighthouse (2012)

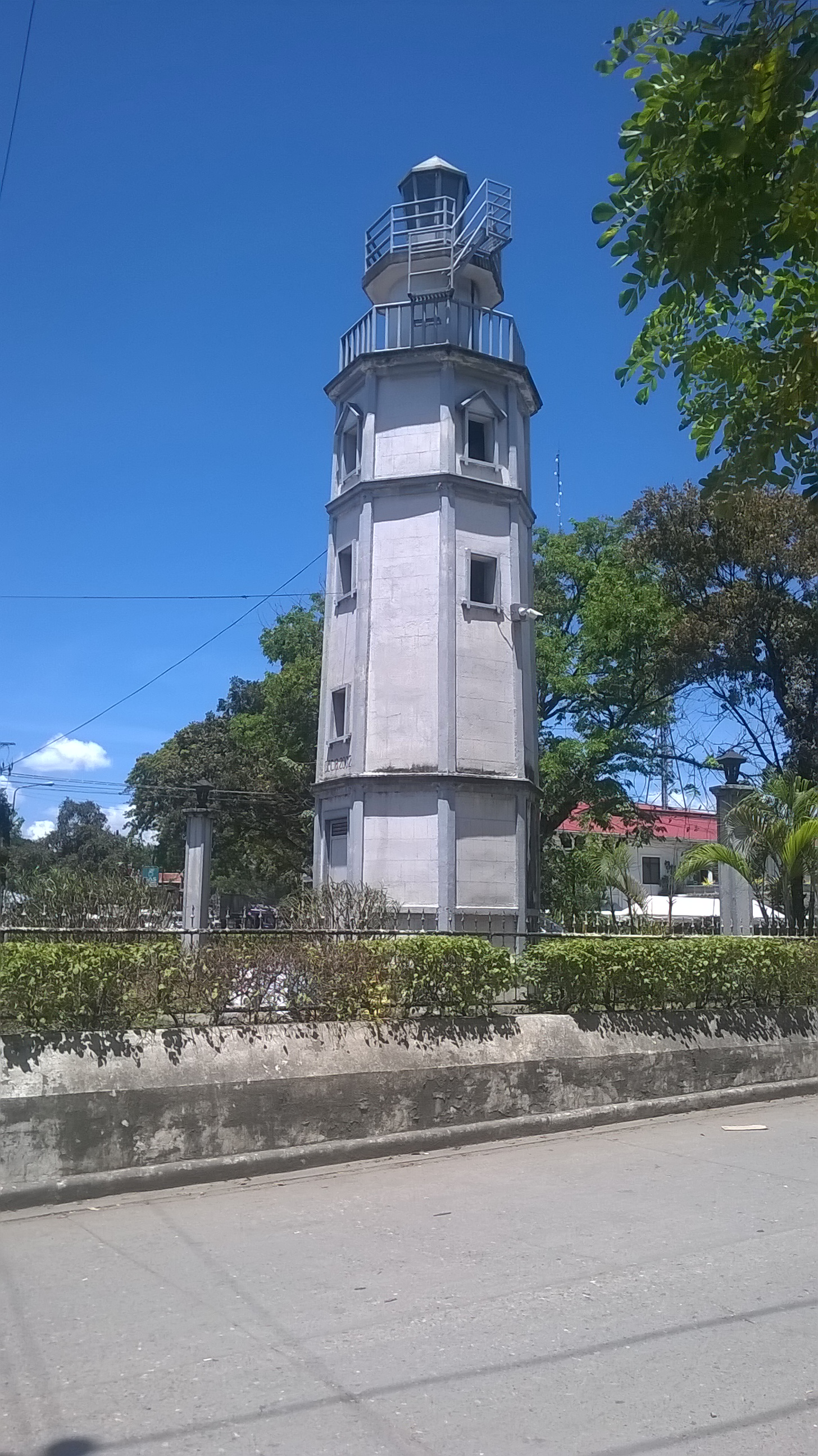
Bagacay Point Lighthouse replica in downtown Liloan

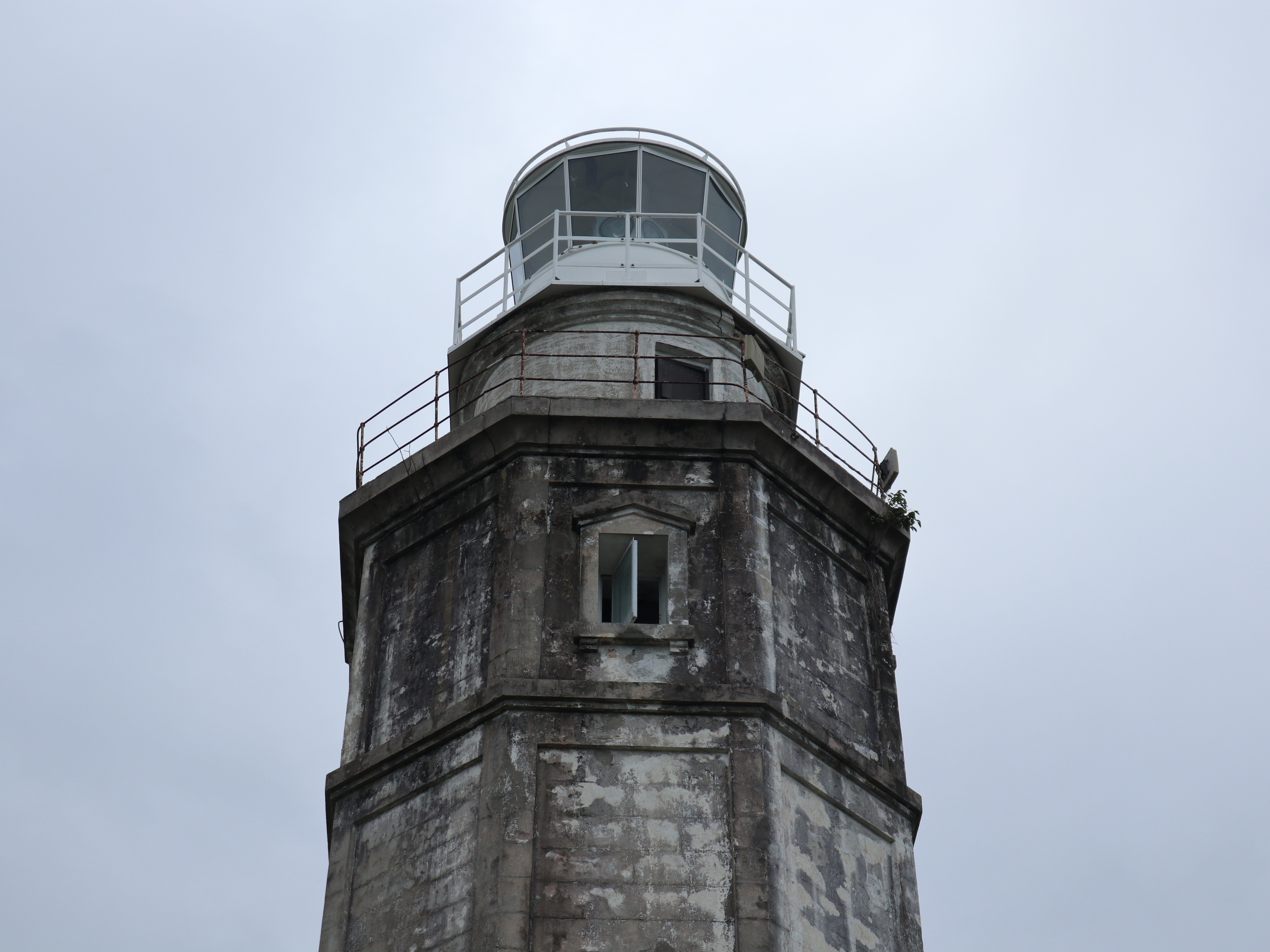
Close up of the gallery deck

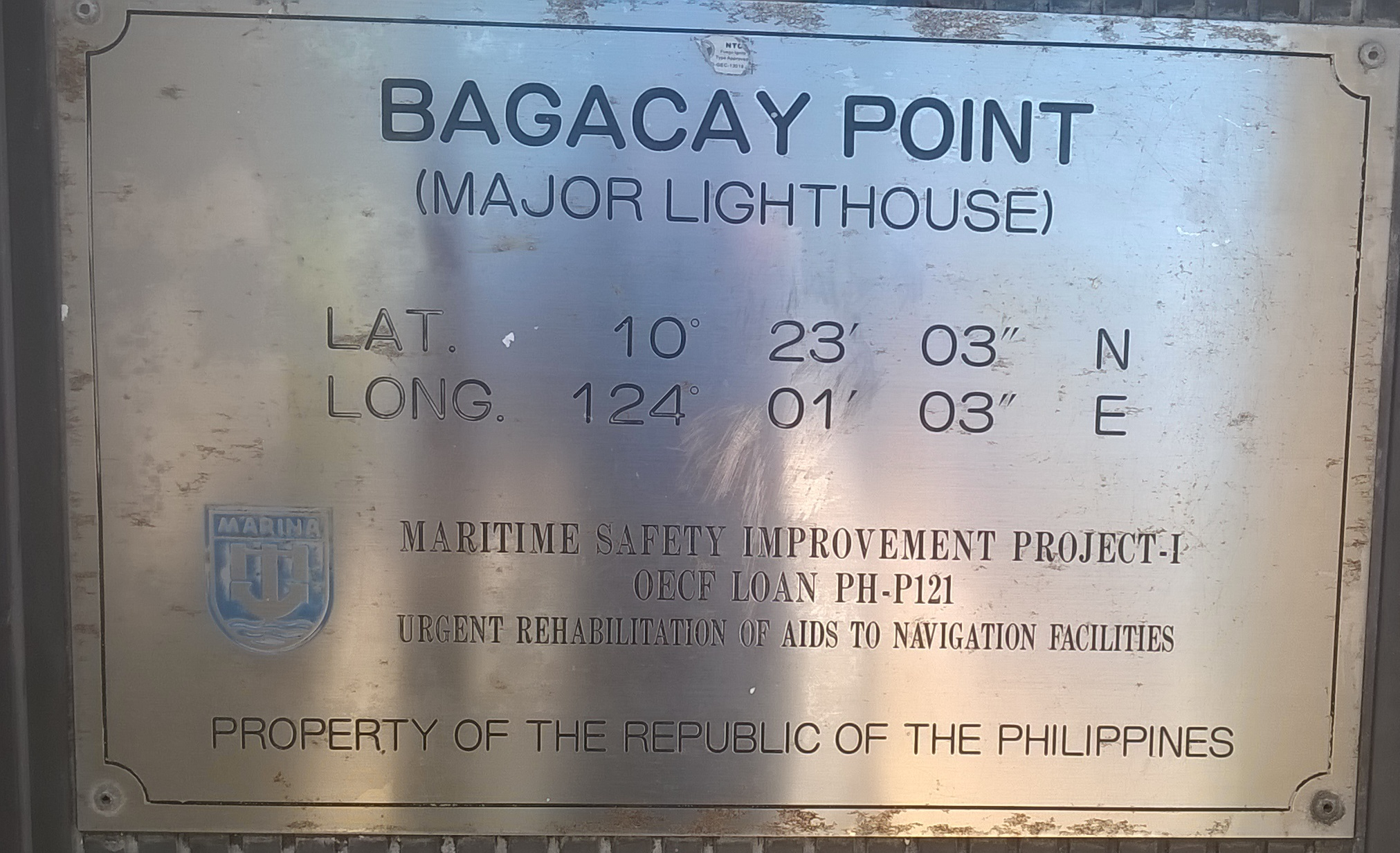
Lighthouse Plaque

== See also ==
- List of lighthouses in the Philippines
