= Liloan =

Municipality in Cebu, Philippines

- Municipality
- Municipality of Liloan
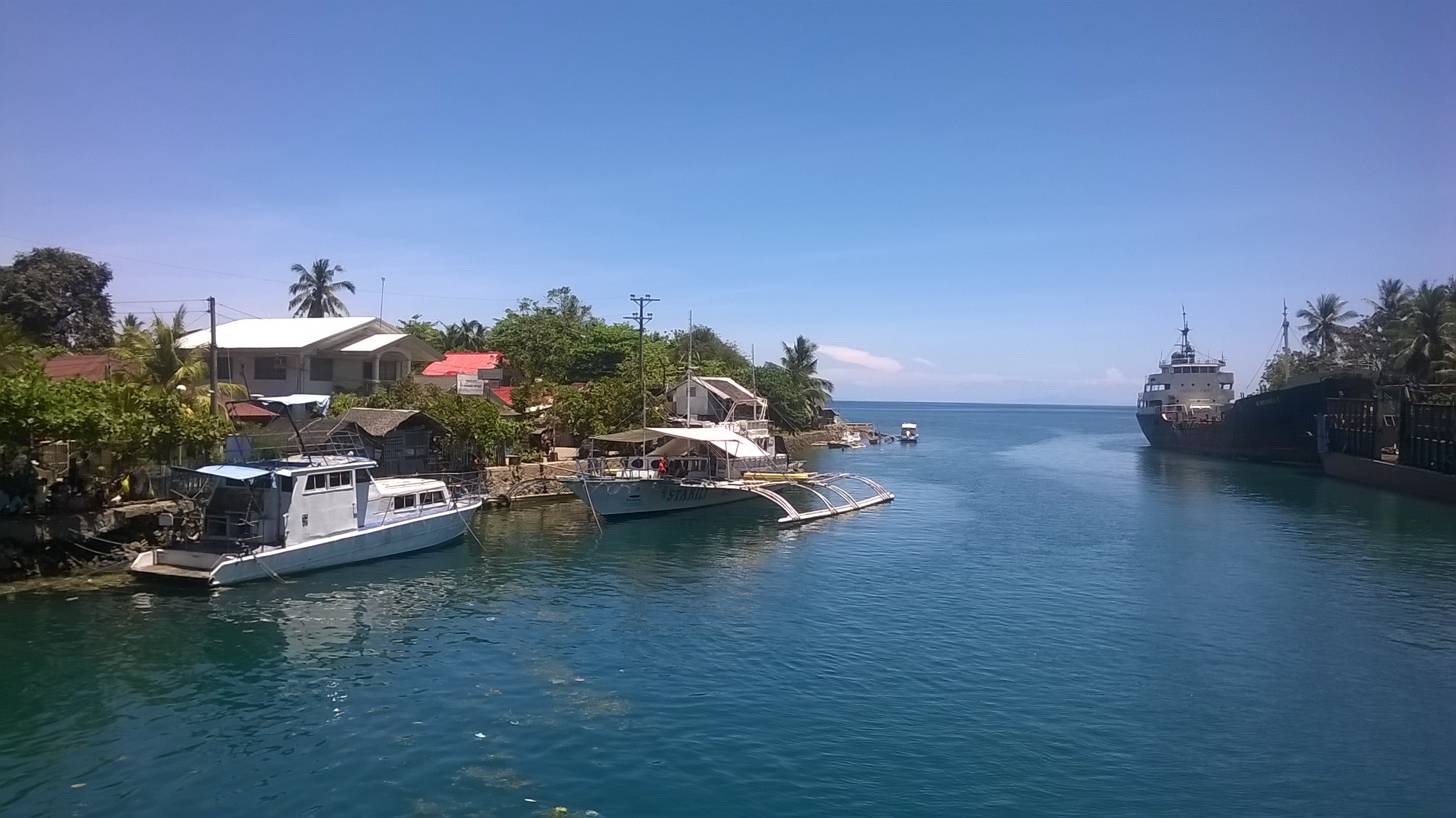
- From Suba bridge

- Seal
- Etymology: Cebuano term lilo, meaning whirlpool
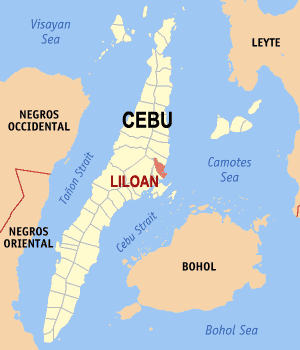
- Map of Cebu with Liloan highlighted
- Interactive map of Liloan
- Location within the Philippines
- Coordinates: 10°24′40″N 123°58′56″E
- Country: Philippines
- Region: Central Visayas
- Province: Cebu
- District: 5th district
- Founded: 1845
- Barangays: 14 (see Barangays)

Government
  - Type: Sangguniang Bayan
  - Mayor: Aljew Fernando J. Frasco
  - Vice Mayor: Margarita D. Frasco
  - Representative: Vincent Franco D. Frasco
  - Municipal Council: Members: Cesar R. Cañete Jr.; Lucelito B. Pilapil; Katherine D. Jumapao; Francisco C. Comendador III; Thelma L. Jordan; Nelly Bernardo L. Lopez; Edna M. Cala
  - Electorate: 87,305 voters (2025)

Area
  - Total: 45.92 km^{2} (17.73 sq mi)
- Elevation: 20 m (66 ft)
- Highest elevation: 231 m (758 ft)
- Lowest elevation: 0 m (0 ft)

Population (2024 census)
  - Total: 158,387
  - Density: 3,449/km^{2} (8,933/sq mi)
  - Households: 37,390

Economy
  - Income class: 1st municipal income class
  - Poverty incidence: 15.81% (2023)
  - Revenue: ₱ 635 million (2024)
  - Assets: ₱ 1,404 million (2024)
  - Expenditure: ₱ 417.4 million (2024)
  - Liabilities: ₱ 423.3 million (2024)

Service provider
  - Electricity: Visayan Electric Company (VECO)
  - Water: Metropolitan Cebu Water District (MCWD)
- Time zone: UTC+8 (PST)
- ZIP code: 6002
- PSGC: 072227000
- IDD : area code: +63 (0)32
- Native language: Cebuano

Liloan, officially the Municipality of Liloan (Cebuano: Lungsod sa Liloan; Tagalog: Bayan ng Liloan), is a municipality in the province of Cebu, Philippines. According to the 2024 census, it has a population of 158,387 people, making it the most populated municipality in Cebu and the whole Visayas. Liloan is known as the Light of North and the home of Titay's rosquillos. It serves as a gateway between Metro Cebu and the northern parts of Cebu.

== History ==
=== Etymological History ===
Along its coastline, there is a spot called Silot, where a whirlpool is created by the ebbs and flows of the waters from the bay. This phenomenon is called lilo in Cebuano. Because of this, the town was known as Liloan, meaning "a place where there is a lilo".

=== The Creation of Liloan and Part in the History of Consolacion & Compostela ===
The creation of Liloan was officially on August 23, 1844 from a superior decree making it officially separated from Mandaue, The Parish was instated in Liloan before the separation. It was officially instated as a parish on January 27, 1845 from a decree handed out by the Bishop of Cebu. The town's organized governance began around 1845, with Capitan Banlitan cited as the first "capitan municipal." Consolacion separated from Liloan and also received a [[supreme decree]] from the Bishop of Cebu for a parish to be created. Compostela merged with Liloan from Danao and later separated in 1919 by its spaniard administration.

=== Liloan during World War II ===
During the war years (World War II), Lilo‑an had three mayors at one time. a small Japanese Shipwreck was found and discovered in Silot Bay as well.

== Geography ==
Liloan is a rapidly developing coastal municipality bounded on the north by the town of Compostela, to the west by Cebu City, on the east by the Camotes Sea, and on the south by the town of Consolacion. It is 18 kilometres (11 mi) from Cebu City. Liloan lies within Metro Cebu. The municipality is characterized by a mixture of coastal plains, mangrove areas near Silot Bay and Mountainous Terrains as well as valleys present in Cotcot, Yati, and Tayud.

=== Barangays ===
Liloan is politically subdivided into 14 barangays. Each barangay consists of puroks and some have sitios.

PSGC	Barangay	Population			±% p.a.	
		2024		2010		
072227001	Cabadiangan	1.3%	1,982	1,790	▴	0.70%
072227002	Calero	3.4%	5,315	4,513	▴	1.13%
072227003	Catarman	10.0%	15,829	14,839	▴	0.45%
072227004	Cotcot	4.3%	6,796	5,185	▴	1.88%
072227005	Jubay	7.5%	11,931	8,819	▴	2.10%
072227006	Lataban	1.4%	2,245	1,863	▴	1.29%
072227007	Mulao	0.7%	1,067	952	▴	0.79%
072227008	Poblacion	9.5%	15,041	13,371	▴	0.81%
072227009	San Roque	1.0%	1,521	1,331	▴	0.92%
072227010	San Vicente	6.5%	10,219	8,665	▴	1.14%
072227011	Santa Cruz	1.4%	2,203	1,899	▴	1.03%
072227012	Tabla	0.9%	1,423	1,189	▴	1.25%
072227013	Tayud	10.0%	15,814	13,616	▴	1.04%
072227014	Yati	17.3%	27,367	22,468	▴	1.37%
	Total		158,387	100,500	▴	3.18%

=== Climate ===
Climate data for Liloan, Cebu
Month	Jan	Feb	Mar	Apr	May	Jun	Jul	Aug	Sep	Oct	Nov	Dec	Year
Mean daily maximum °C (°F)	28 (82)	29 (84)	30 (86)	31 (88)	31 (88)	30 (86)	30 (86)	30 (86)	30 (86)	29 (84)	29 (84)	28 (82)	30 (85)
Mean daily minimum °C (°F)	23 (73)	23 (73)	23 (73)	24 (75)	25 (77)	25 (77)	25 (77)	25 (77)	25 (77)	25 (77)	24 (75)	23 (73)	24 (75)
Average precipitation mm (inches)	70 (2.8)	49 (1.9)	62 (2.4)	78 (3.1)	138 (5.4)	201 (7.9)	192 (7.6)	185 (7.3)	192 (7.6)	205 (8.1)	156 (6.1)	111 (4.4)	1,639 (64.6)
Average rainy days	13.4	10.6	13.1	14.5	24.2	27.9	28.4	27.7	27.1	27.4	22.5	15.9	252.7
Source: Meteoblue

== Demographics ==
Population census of Liloan
Year	Pop.	±% p.a.
1903	10,024	—
1918	19,842	+4.66%
1939	13,662	−1.76%
1948	12,292	−1.17%
1960	16,424	+2.44%
1970	22,495	+3.19%
1975	26,492	+3.33%
1980	30,196	+2.65%
1990	42,587	+3.50%
1995	50,973	+3.43%
2000	64,970	+5.34%
2007	92,606	+5.01%
2010	100,500	+3.02%
2015	118,753	+3.23%
2020	153,197	+5.51%
2024	158,387	+0.80%
Source: Philippine Statistics Authority

== Economy ==
Poverty incidence of Liloan (%)

Source: Philippine Statistics Authority

== Landmarks ==
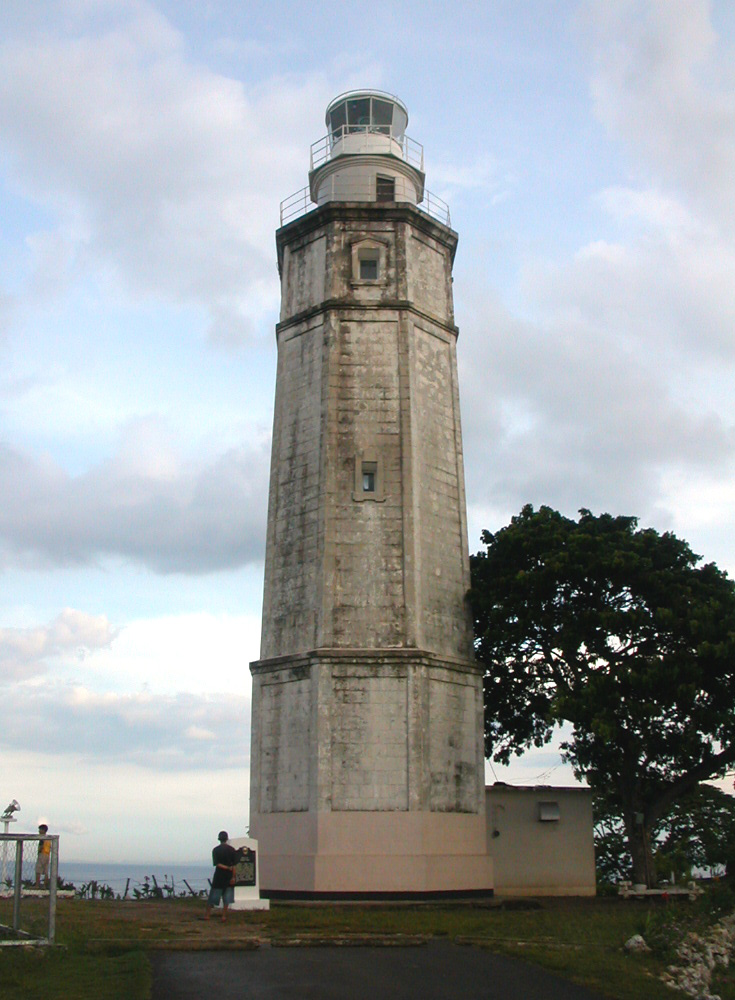
The Bagacay Point Lighthouse

=== Lighthouse ===
The lighthouse at Bagacay Point was built in 1857 by the Spanish. The current tower was constructed in 1904 by order of William Howard Taft, the first Governor-General of the Philippines and later the President of the United States. The tower is 22 metres (72 ft) tall and remains in active use today, using solar energy. The lighthouse was declared a National Historical Landmark in 2004 by the National Historical Commission of the Philippines (formerly known as National Historical Institute).

=== Pier 88 ===
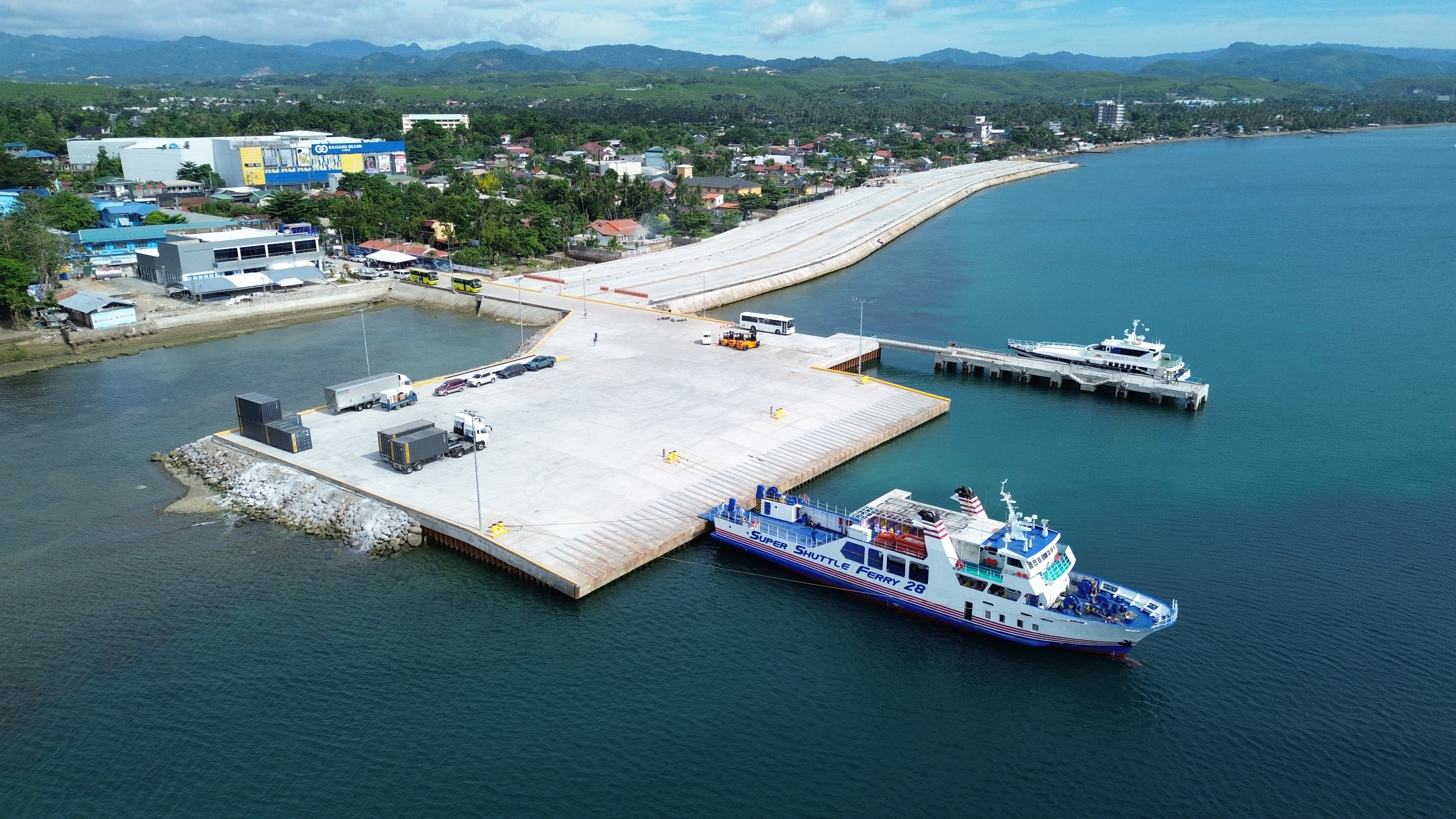
Pier 88 with moored passenger ferries. Waiting room in the background, facility managed by Topline company. Photo: Bart Sakwerda/Budots Media

Pier 88 is a maritime terminal in Liloan that connects the islands of the Central Visayas region: Camotes, LapuLapu City and Cebu City. The Pier was officially inaugurated and opened to the public on May 27, 2023, by Bongbong Marcos.

=== Titay's Rosquillos and Delicacies ===
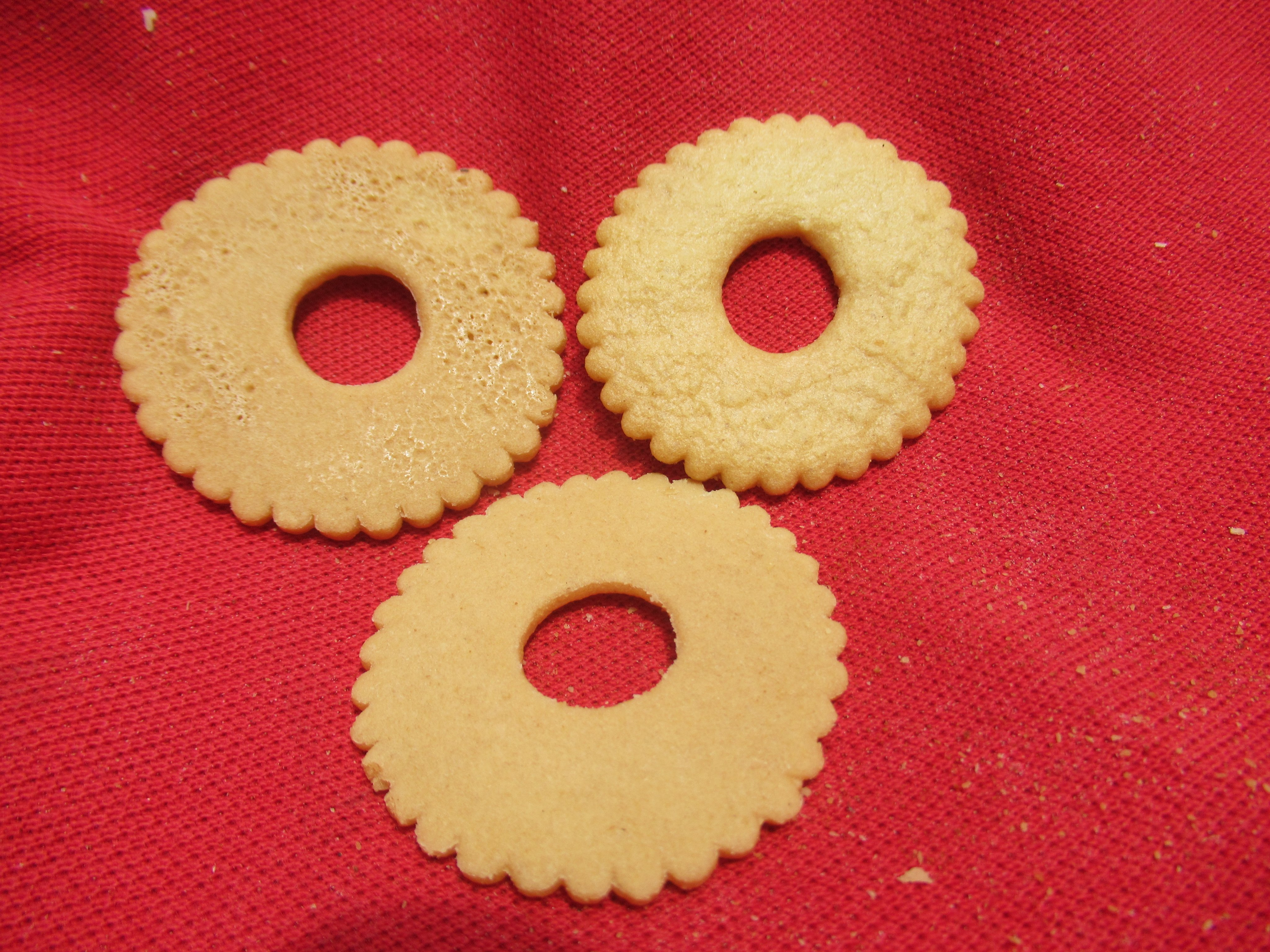
"Titay's" Rosquillos

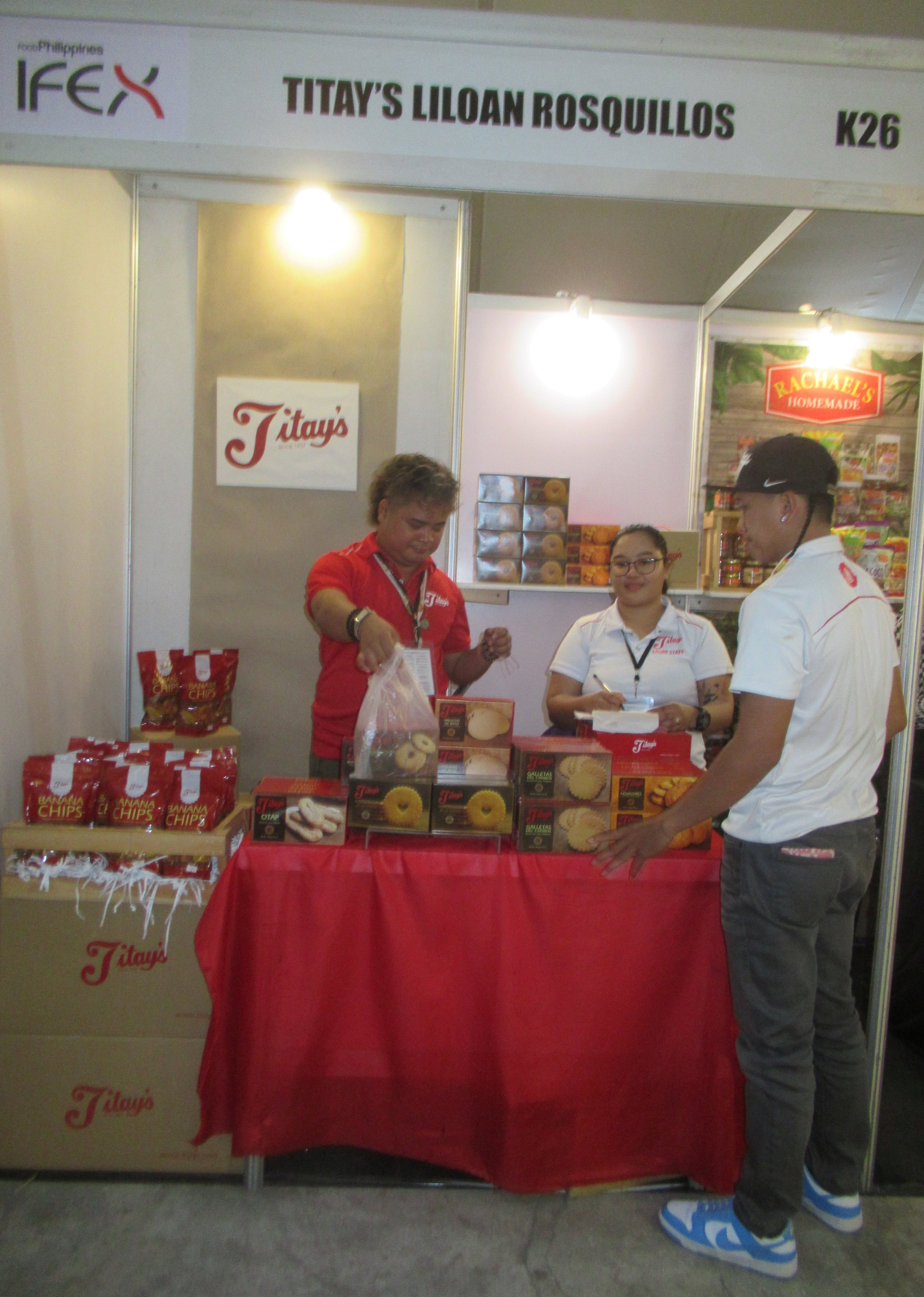
"Titay's" Rosquillo (WTC, IFEx)

Titay's Rosquillos and Delicacies is a baking company started in Liloan in 1907, baking foods like rosquillos, tablea and hojaldres. In 2012, its two-hectare plant in Liloan produced about 3,000 packs of 180 grams Rosquillos daily by 118 workers.

In 2013, the flagship store, which produces 360,000 rosquillos a day was transformed into a café for 45 customers serving penato (peanuts), banana chips, and binangkal, among others.

On April 1, 2024, Christina Frasco, with members of her family, partook in the groundbreaking of its Poblacion, Liloan 1.3-hectare new factory which will employ to 250 workers.

== Tourism ==
=== Rosquillos Festival ===
Celebrated every last week of May in honor of the town's patron saint, St. Ferdinand III. It celebrates the Rosquillos as the delicacy of Liloan and of Cebu. The 12th Rosquillos festival was held on May 26, 2019. The 13th returned from May 20–30, 2023, coinciding with the 176th annual foundation fiesta celebration.

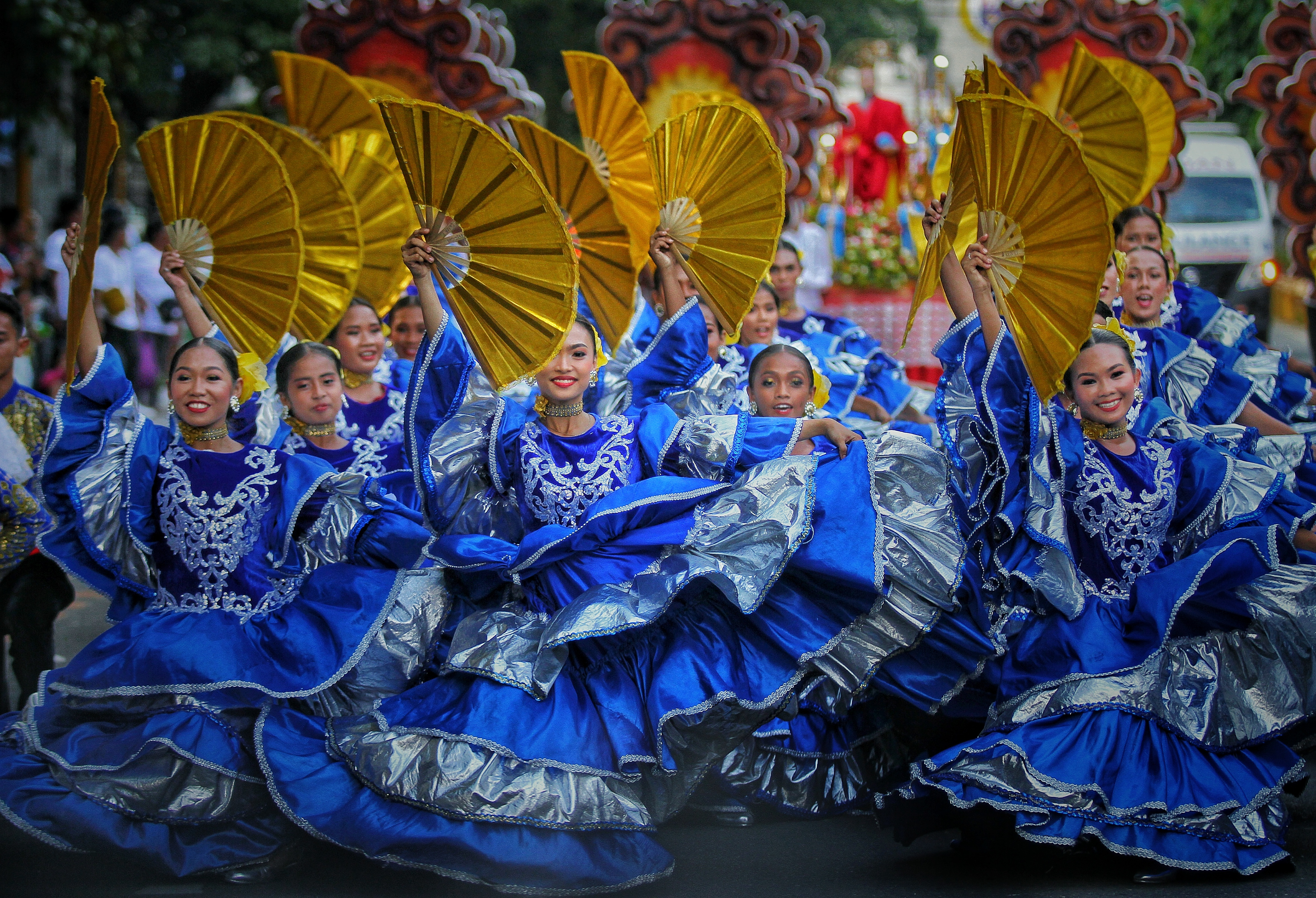
Rosquillos Festival dancers as they perform their street dance in Pasigarbo sa Sugbo 2019.

== List of heads of local government ==
- Basilio Bantilan (1845–1846)
- Hipolito Pepito (1846–1847)
- Francisco Cabahug (1847–1848 and 1859–1860)
- Esteban Cañete (1848–1849, 1850–1851 and 1852–1853)
- Juan Delgado (1849–1850)
- Juan Cabatingan (1851–1852 and 1861–1862)
- Cruz Medoza (1853–1855 and 1860–1861)
- Alberto Yungco (1855–1857)
- Victor Pepito (1857–1858, 1863–1865 and 1875–1879)
- Pedro Pepito (1858–1859 and 1862–1863)
- Felix Cabatingan (1865–1867)
- Jacinto Cañete (1867–1869)
- Apolonio Pilapil (1869–1871)
- Custodio Mendoza (1871–1873, 1883–1885 and 1899–1900)
- Guillermo Pepito (1873–1875)
- Ambrosio Pepito (1879–1881)
- Eugenio Pilapil (1881–1883 and 1889–1891)
- Mamerto Cabatingan (1883–1887 and 1891–1893)
- Sotero Cabatingan (1887–1889, 1900–1902 and 1905–1909)
- Antonio Villamor (1893–1896)
- Simeon Pilapil (1896–1898)
- Mariano Pilapil (1898–1899)
- Blas Cabatingan (1902–1904)
- Marcelo Pilapil (1909–1911)
- Francisco Ramas (1911–1912)
- Jose Cabatingan (1912–1916)
- Cirilo Ramas (1916–1919)
- Cipiriano Jumapao (1919–1922)
- Florintino Pilapil (1922–1925)
- Santiago Noval (1925–1928)
- Lazaro Ramas (1928–1937, 1937–1938, 1959–1963 and 1963–1965)
- Catalino Noval (1941–1945, 1945–1946 and 1965–1967)
- Jorge Pitogo (1946–1947 and 1947–1951)
- Fabian Cañete (1951–1955)
- Teofilo Ponce (1967–1971)
- Cesar Bugtai (1971–1986)
- Achilles Cañete (1986–1988 and 1988–1992)
- Panphil Frasco (1992–1995, 1995–1998 and 1998–2001)
- Maria Sevilla (2001–2004 and 2004–2007)
- Duke Frasco (2007–2016)
- Christina Garcia-Frasco (2016–2022)
- Aljew Frasco (2022–present)

== Gallery ==
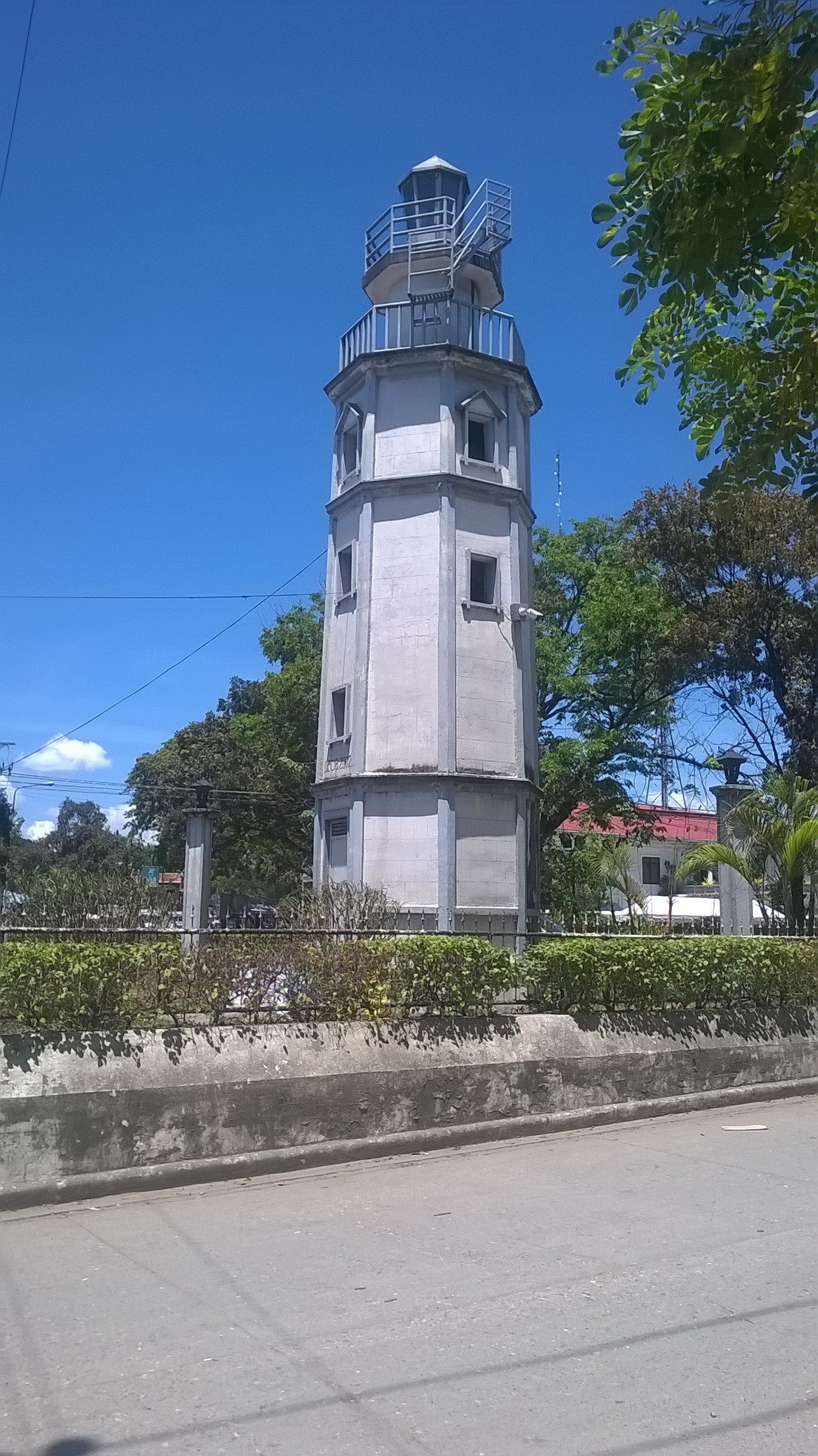
Miniature Lighthouse Sculpture at the Main Crossroad

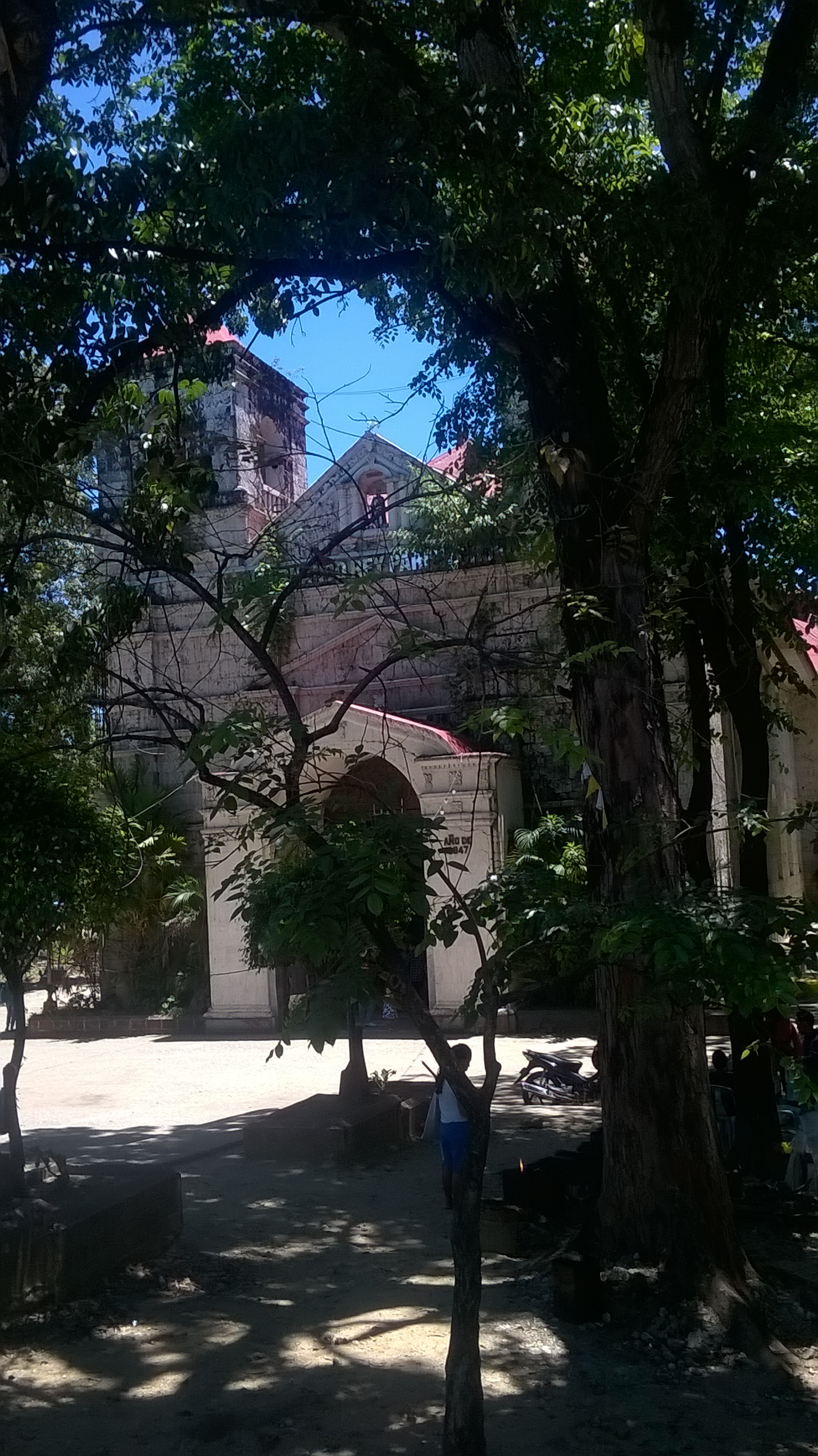
San Fernando Rey Church

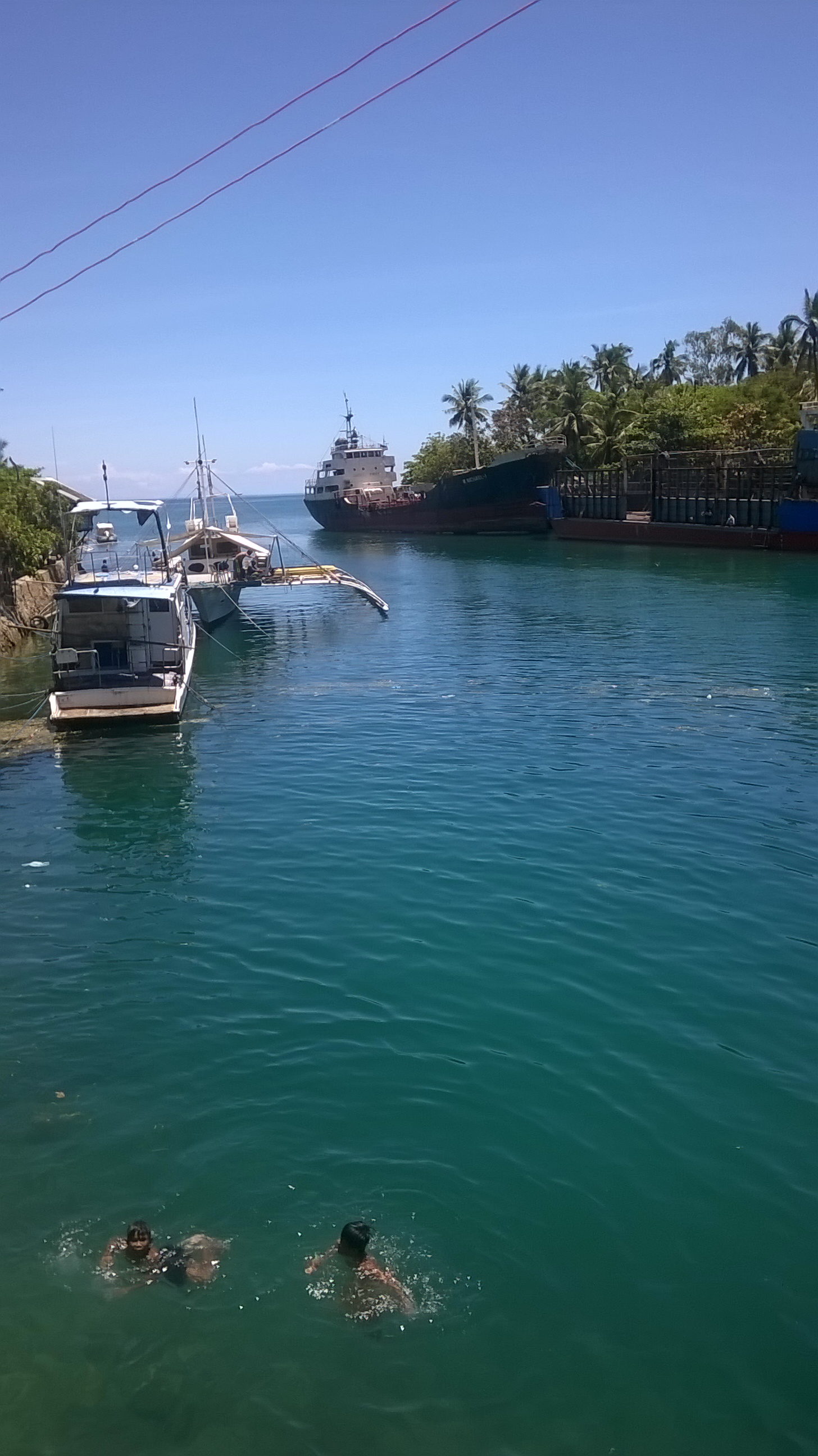
From Suba Bridge

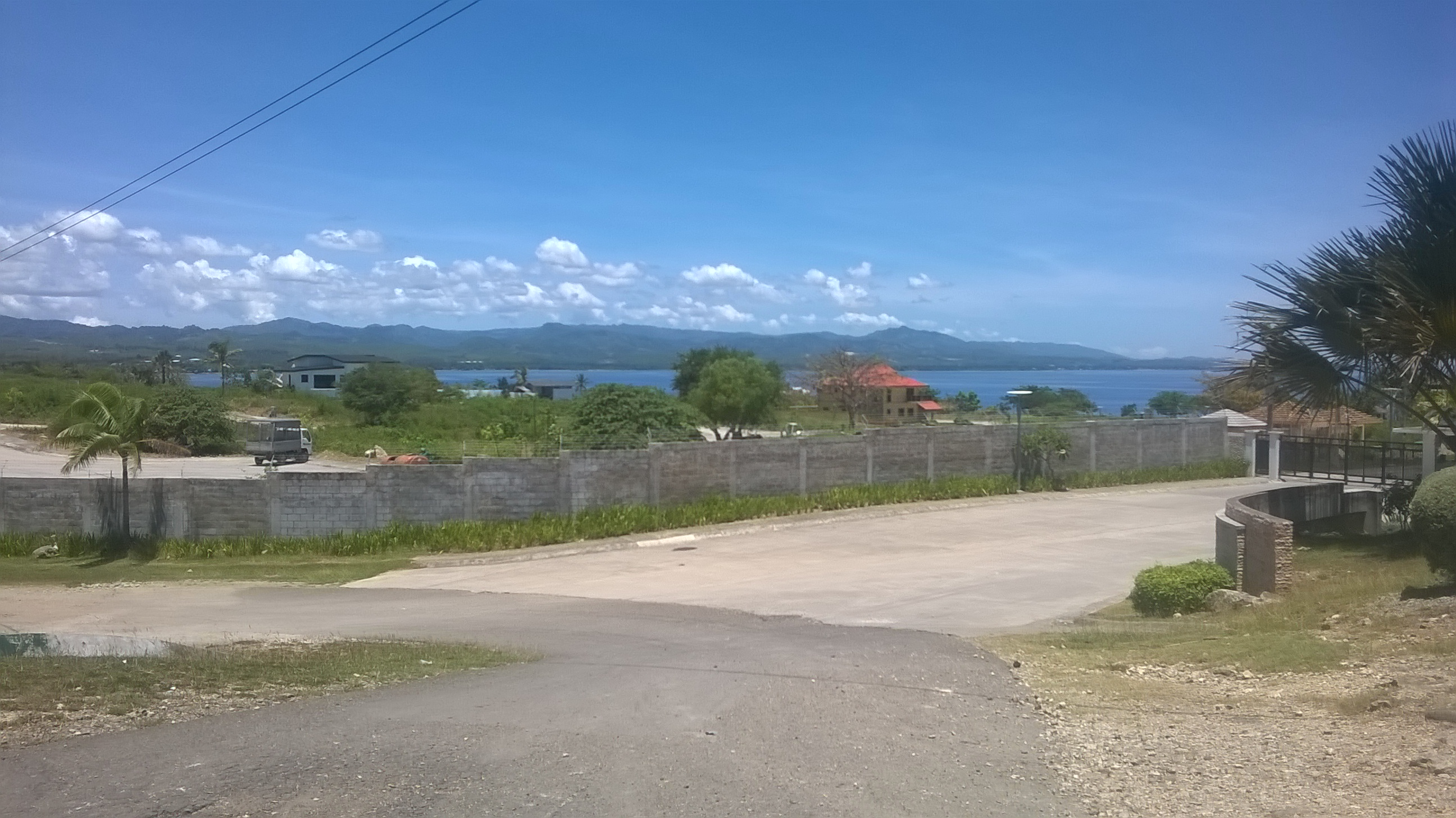
Looking towards Compostela

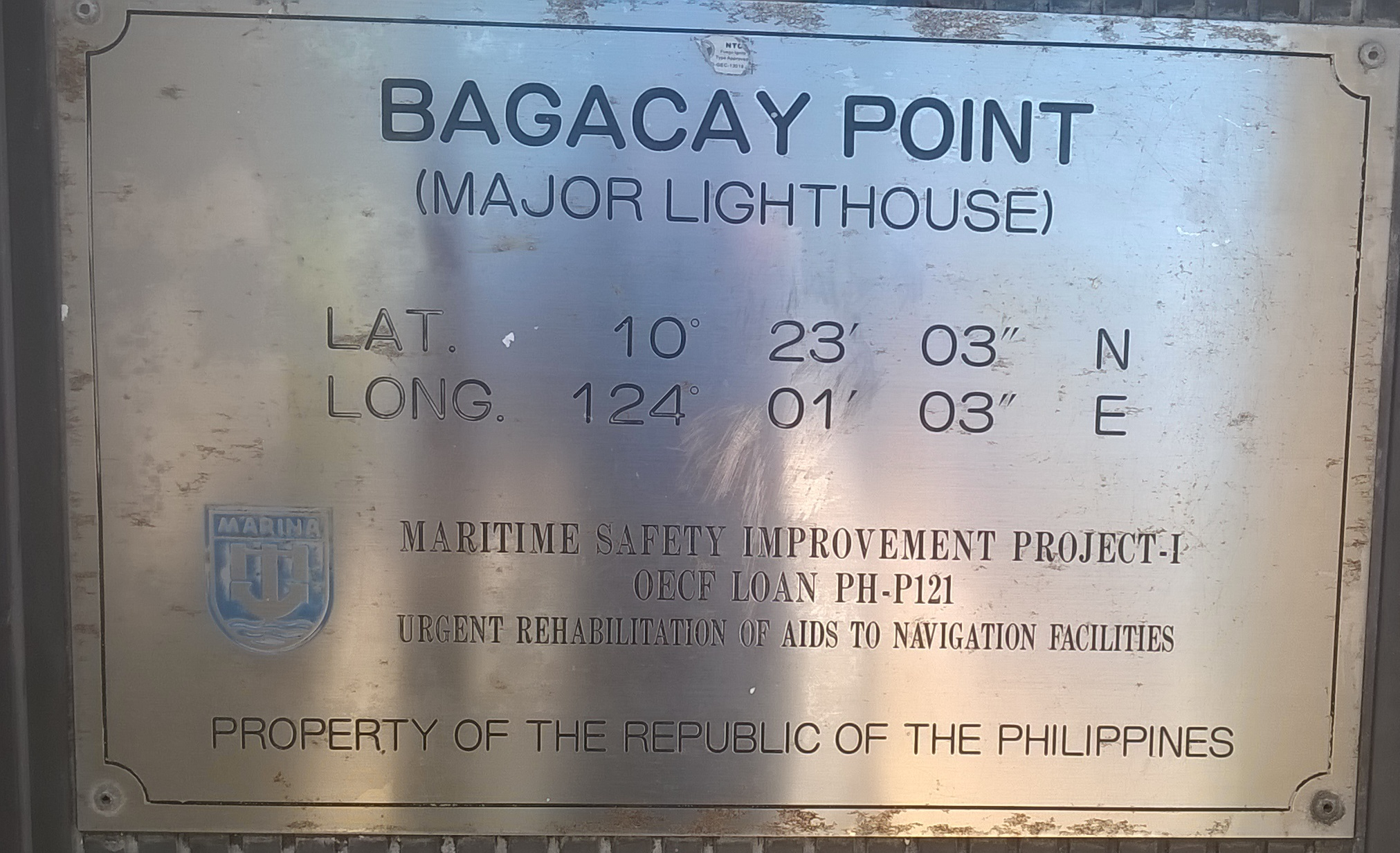
Bagacay Lighthouse – Plaque

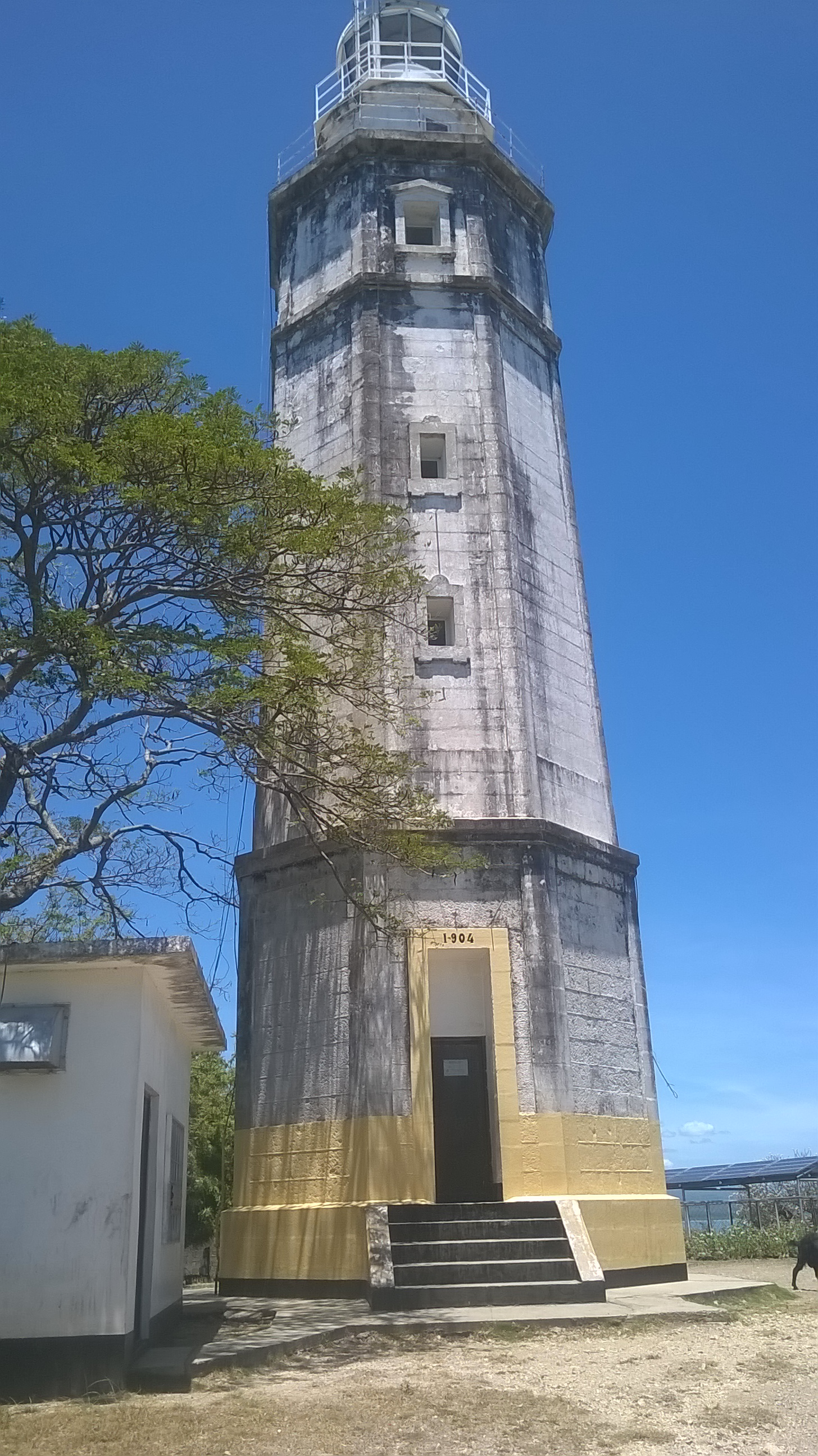
Bagacay Lighthouse

== Notable people ==
- Pilar Pilapil - Actress
- Christina Frasco - Former DOT Secretary
- Duke Frasco - Congressman
- Jayboy Magdadaro - Hero duringTyphoon Kalmaegi
- Joshua Sandal - Hero during Typhoon Kalmaegi

== See also ==
- Liloan, Southern Leyte - a municipality in Southern Leyte
- Liloan - a barangay in Santander, Cebu

== Sources ==
- Gonzales, Glenda R. (December 2004). "Metro Cebu: A Metropolitan Area in Need of Coordinative Body" (PDF). Discussion Paper. 2004-49. PIDS. Archived (PDF) from the original on March 10, 2016.
- Sendino y Redondo, Felipe (1886). Breve reseña de lo que fue y de lo que es la Diócesis de Cebú en las Islas Filipinas (in Spanish). Manila: Colegio de Santo Tomas.
