= Trade Union Congress of the Philippines =

National trade union federation

TUCP
- Trade Union Congress of the Philippines (TUCP)
- Katipunan ng Manggagawang Pilipino (KMP)
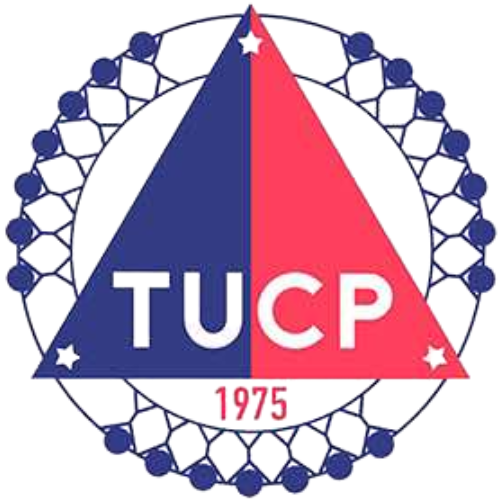
- Founded: 1975
- Headquarters: Quezon City, Metro Manila, Philippines
- Location: Philippines
- Key people: Raymond Mendoza, President Arnel Dolendo, Secretary-General Esperanza Ocampo, Treasurer
- Affiliations: ITUC
- Website: https://tucp.org.ph/

The Trade Union Congress of the Philippines (TUCP) is the largest labor center in the Philippines, representing workers across both the public and private sectors, including those in the formal and informal economy, as well as land-based and sea-based workers in the Philippines and overseas. The TUCP has represented Filipino workers at the International Labour Organization (ILO) for over five decades and is a founding member of the International Trade Union Confederation (ITUC), to which it has belonged for nearly two decades. It is also affiliated with various global union federations, advancing the interests of Filipino workers in the international labor movement.

== History ==
On 14 December 1975, twenty-three labor federations from across the Philippines unified to establish a single national labor center for the Filipino working class, which became Trade Union Congress of the Philippines. Formed during a period of political and economic turbulence, the organization sought to consolidate labor representation, promote workers’ rights, and pursue industrial peace through social dialogue rather than conflict.

The founding president of the Trade Union Congress of the Philippines (TUCP) was Roberto “Ka Bobby” Oca, a labor leader who advanced the cause of Filipino seafarers both domestically and internationally, including within the International Transport Workers’ Federation. In 1978, leadership passed to Atty. Democrito “Ka Kito” T. Mendoza, a World War II veteran, labor lawyer, and prominent advocate for workers’ rights from Cebu. Mendoza served as TUCP president for nearly four decades, during which the organization played a significant role as a social partner of government and employers. Under his leadership, TUCP co-founded the ASEAN Trade Union Council and represented Filipino workers in the Governing Body of the International Labour Organization.

As the organization expanded, several of its leaders also assumed roles in government, contributing to labor legislation and policy. Januario Sen represented the labor sector in the Interim Batasang Pambansa. Zoilo dela Cruz was instrumental in the conceptualization of key labor measures, including the 13th Month Pay and the Social Amelioration Program for the sugar industry. Other TUCP leaders, including Andres Dinglasan Jr., Temistocles Dejon Sr., and Alejandro Villavisa, served as labor representatives in the 9th and 10th Congresses of the House of Representatives. Senator Ernesto “Boy” Herrera, also associated with the labor movement, sponsored and advocated for the legislated wage increase enacted in 1989.

As the TUCP grew, its co-founders and leaders carried the labor struggle into the halls of government, such as Januario Sen, who represented Industrial Labor–Visayas in the Interim Batasang Pambansa in 1978 and filed the only profit-sharing bill of that time, as well as Zoilo dela Cruz, who conceptualized the 13th Month Pay and the Social Amelioration Program in the sugar industry when he represented the Labor sector together with Andres Dinglasan Jr., Temistocles Dejon Sr., and Alejandro Villavisa in the 9th and 10th Congresses in the House of Representatives. Longtime TUCP Secretary General-turned-Senator Ernesto “Boy” Herrera also championed the last legislated wage hike in 1989 and authored the landmark amendments to the Labor Code and the Migrant Workers Act of 1995, among many others.

== National Advocacy & Representation ==
Among the key advocacies of the TUCP are the pursuit of higher minimum wages toward a living wage standard and the promotion of job security through proposed legislation on Security of Tenure, which seeks to regulate or eliminate abusive forms of contractualization. The TUCP has also advocated for a national “just transition” framework to support workers affected by economic and technological change, including programs for upskilling and reskilling in emerging sectors such as renewable energy, environmental conservation, and digital industries, in response to the challenges posed by climate change and ongoing digital transformation.

The TUCP also chose to carry the workers' voice in tripartite bodies such as the Social Security System (SSS), the Home Development Mutual Fund (Pag-IBIG Fund), the Bases Conversion and Development Authority (BCDA), the Department of Tourism (DOT), the Department of Social Welfare and Development (DSWD), the Cebu Port Authority (CPA), the National Wages and Productivity Commission (NWPC), the Regional Tripartite Wages and Productivity Boards (RTWPBs), the Authority of the Freeport Area of Bataan (AFAB), the National Labor Relations Commission (NLRC), and the National Tripartite Industrial Peace Council (NTIPC), among others, to secure concrete gains for workers.

== International Solidarity ==
TUCP President Mendoza serves as the Titular Member of the International Trade Union Confederation-Asia Pacific Regional Council. In 2023, he was reelected as a Titular Member and elected as vice president of the International Trade Union Confederation-Asia Pacific. In 2026, he was elected as the General Secretary of the ASEAN Trade Union Council (ASEAN-TUC) in Jakarta, Indonesia during the ASEAN-TUC Triennial General Assembly wherein he advocates, among others, for the ASEANTUC to be officially recognized as a partner of the Association of Southeast Asian Nations (ASEAN) and the ASEAN Inter-Parliamentary Assembly (AIPA) to comprehensively discuss and develop Just Transition mechanisms, champion the plight of migrant workers, and respect for fundamental human and labor rights

== TUCP Officers & Executive Board ==
Elected during the 8th TUCP Convention held on April 2, 2016

President: Atty. Raymond Democrito C. Mendoza – President, TUCP; Representative, TUCP Party-list, Deputy Speaker, House of Representatives

General Secretary: Atty. Arnel Z. Dolendo – President, PTGWO

Treasurer: Esperanza S. Ocampo – President, PGEA

== TUCP Affiliates ==
All Workers Trade Union (AWATU)

Alliance of Workers in the Informal Economy Sector (ALLWIE/S)

Associated Labor Unions-VIMCONTU (ALU-VIMCONTU)

Associated Metal and Allied Workers Union (ALU-METAL)

Associated Textile, Garments and Allied Workers Union (ALU-TEXTILE)

Associated Transport and Allied Workers Union (ALU-TRANSPORT)

Association of Trade Unions (ATU)

Associated Professional, Supervisory, Office and Technical Employees Union (APSOTEU)

Associated Philippine Seafarers Union (APSU)

Confederation of Labor and Allied Social Services (CLASS)

Federation of Unions of Rizal (FUR)

Kapisanan ng mga Kawani ng Koreo sa Pilipinas (KKKP)

Pambansang Kilusan ng Paggawa (KILUSAN)

National Union of Portworkers in the Philippines (NUPP)

National Congress of Unions in the Sugar Industry of the Philippines (NACUSIP)

Overseas Filipino Workers Family Association (OFW/FA)

Philippines Airlines Employees Association (PALEA)

Philippine Government Employees Association (PGEA)

Philippine Integrated Industries Labor Union (PIILU)

Philippine Trade and General Workers Organization (PTGWO)

Technical Education and Skills Development Authority-Association of Concerned Employees (TESDA-ACE)
