= Carcar =

Component city in Cebu, Philippines

- Component city
- City of Carcar
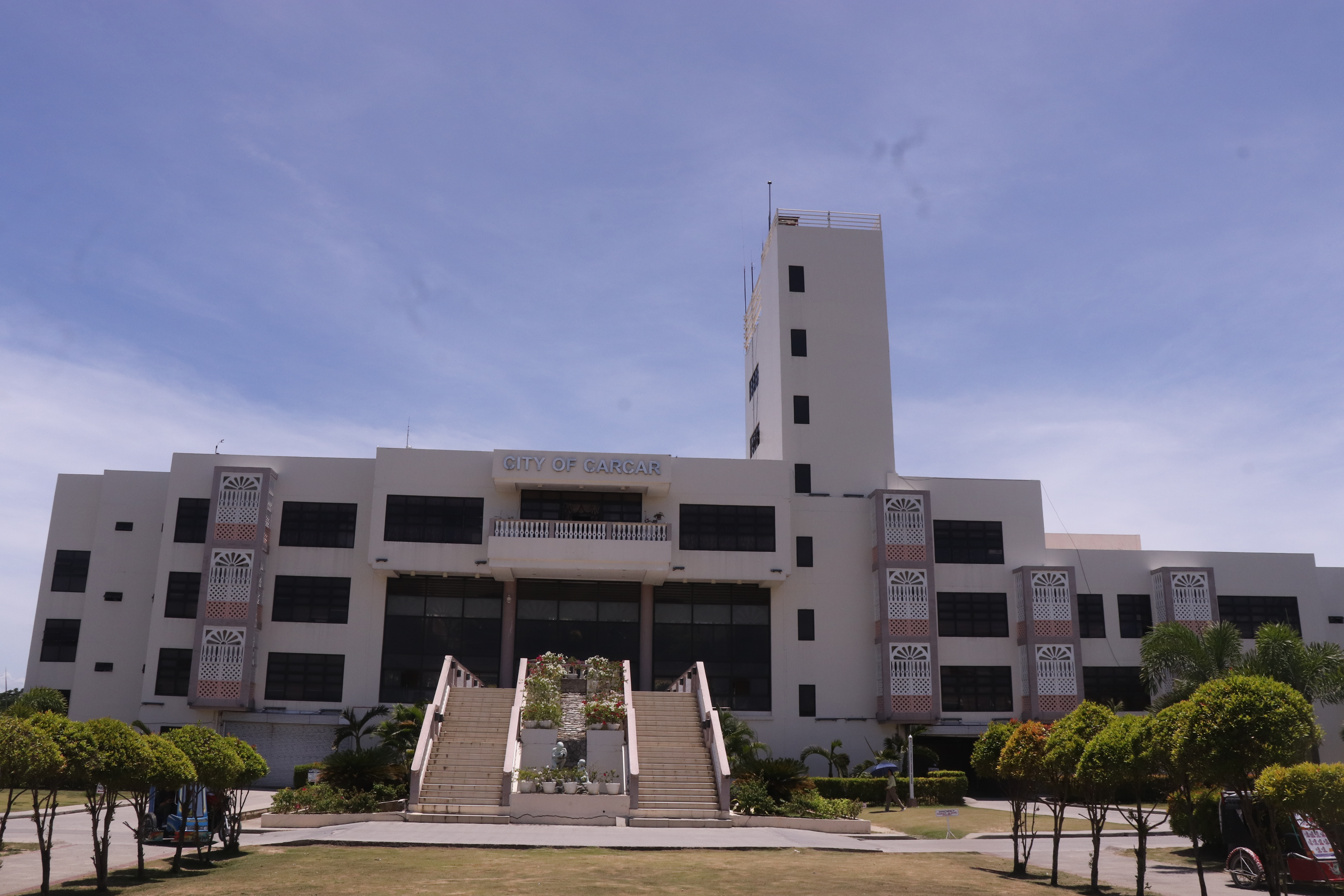
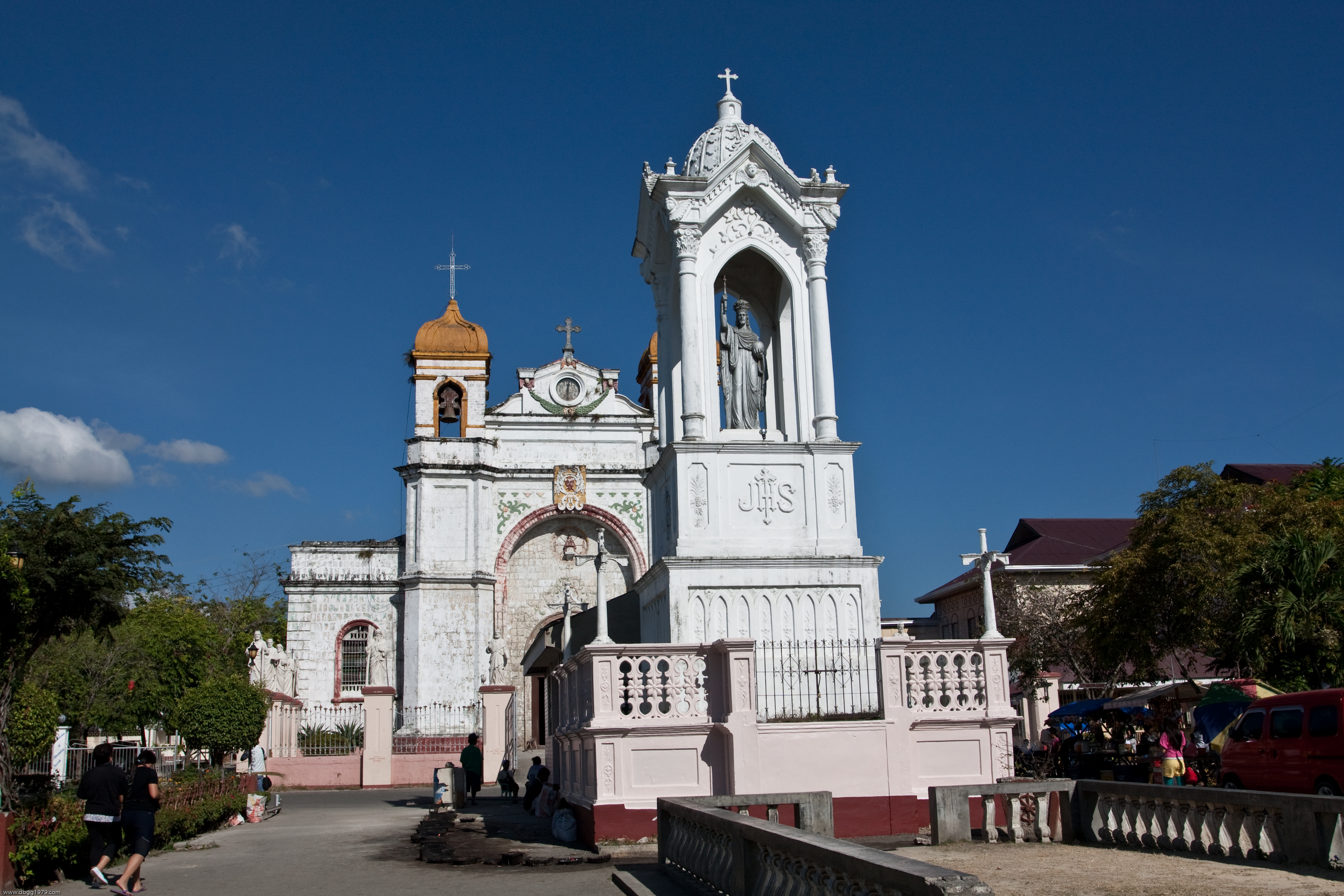
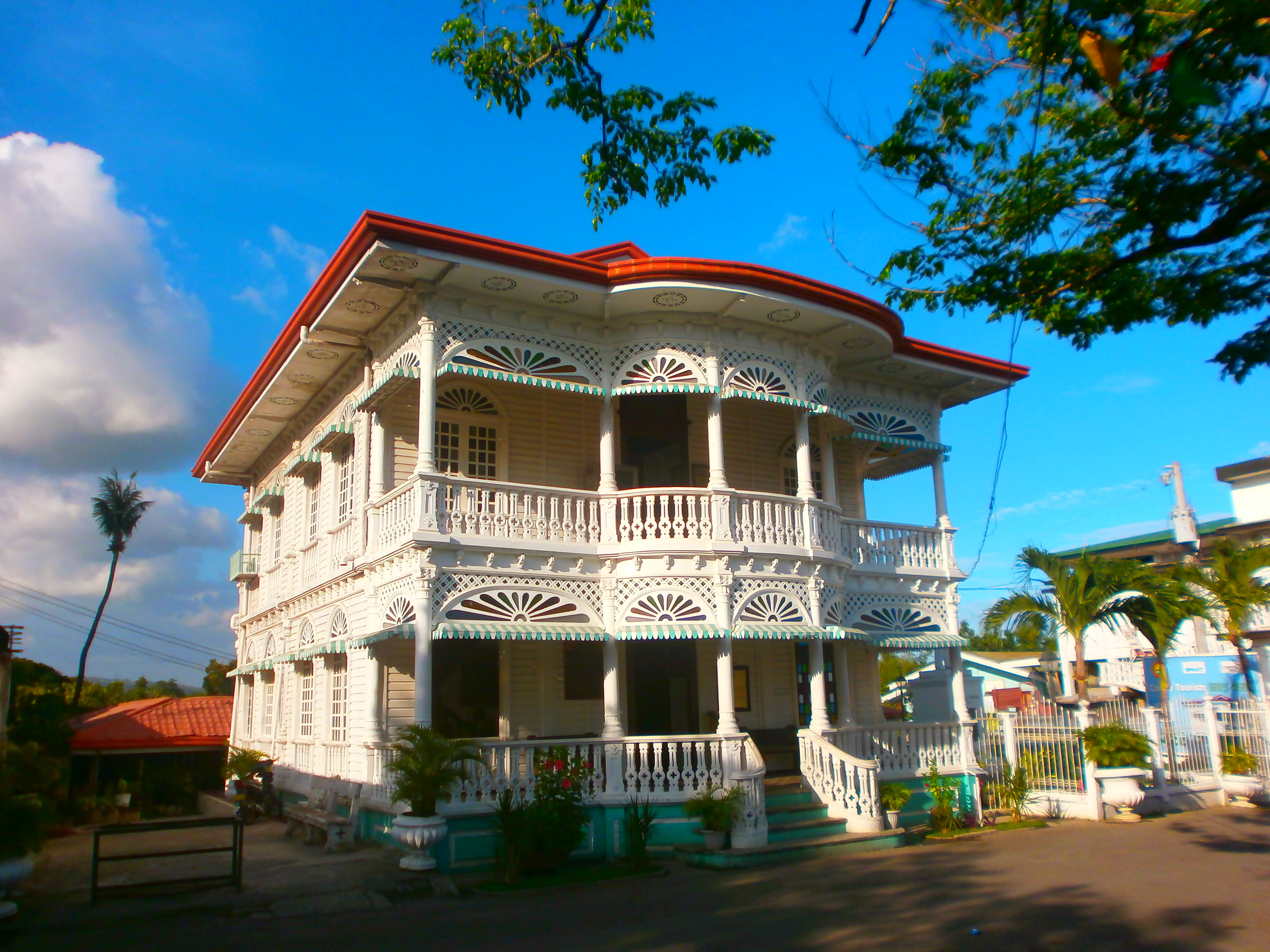
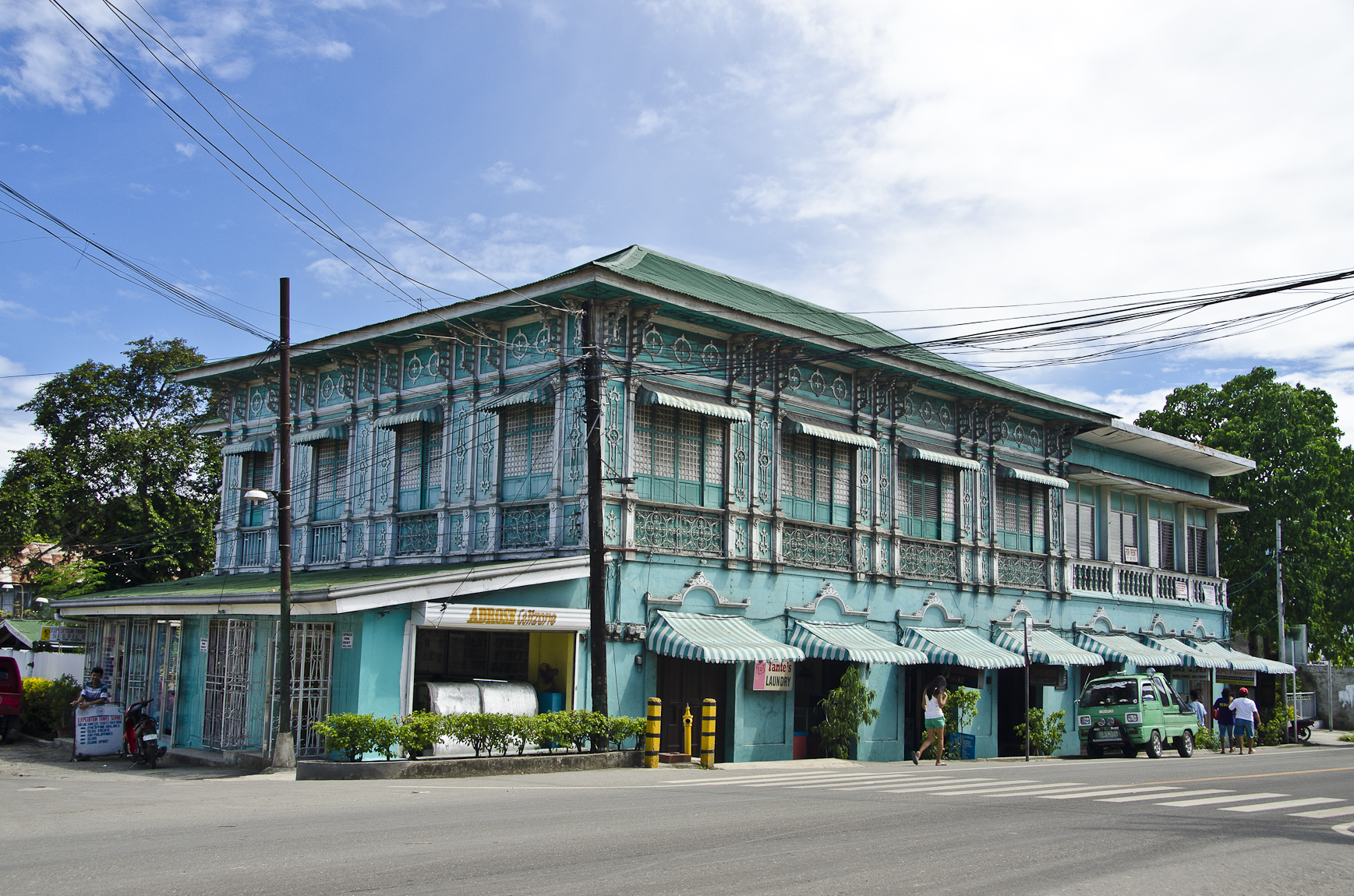
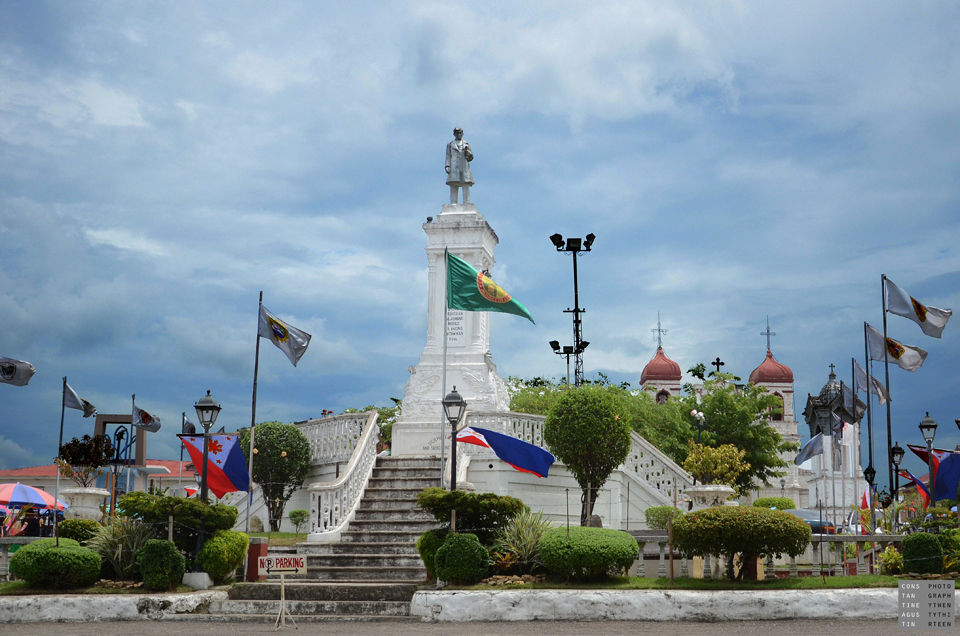
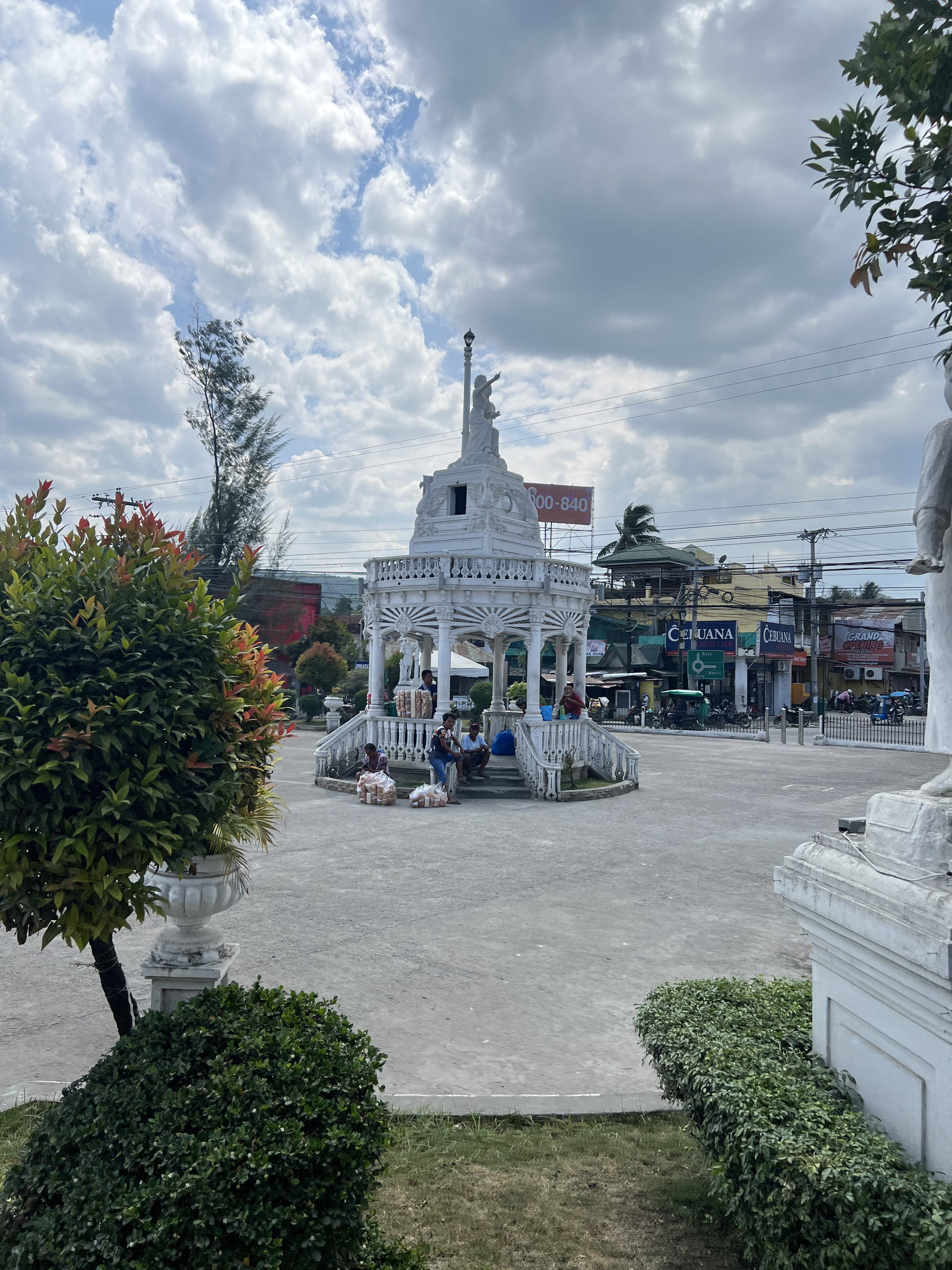
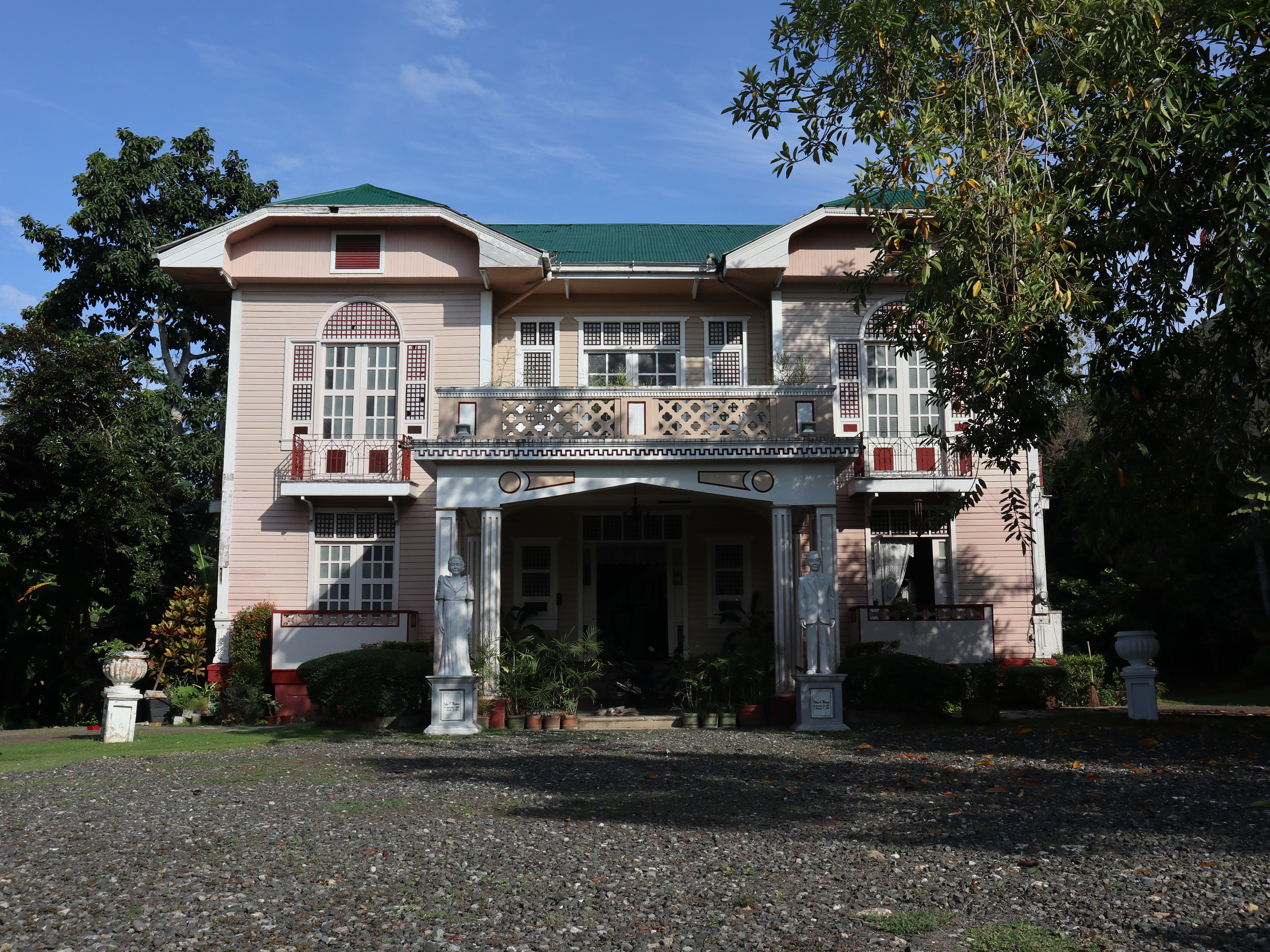
- Left to right, from the top: New Carcar City Hall, St. Catherine's Church, Carcar, Carcar City Museum, Mercado Mansion,Carcar City Plaza - Jose Rizal Monument, Carcar Rotunda, and Mancao Ancestral House.

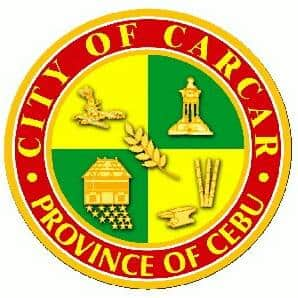
- Seal
- Nicknames: Heritage City of the South; Shoe Capital of Cebu
- Motto: Sidlak Carcar!, Sadya Carcar!
- Anthem: Ganghaan sa Habagatan (Gateway to the South)
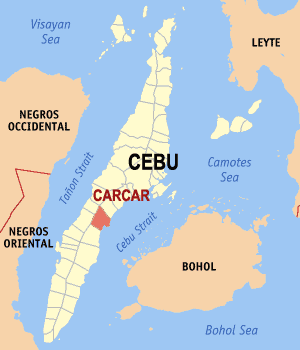
- Map of Cebu with Carcar highlighted
- Interactive map of Carcar
- Location within the Philippines
- Coordinates: 10°07′N 123°38′E
- Country: Philippines
- Region: Central Visayas
- Province: Cebu
- District: 1st district
- Founded: 1599
- Cityhood: July 1, 2007 (Lost cityhood in 2008 and 2010)
- Affirmed Cityhood: February 15, 2011
- Barangays: 15 (see Barangays)

Government
  - Type: Sangguniang Panlungsod
  - Mayor: Mario Patricio P. Barcenas (NP)
  - Vice Mayor: Hervy Alejandro B. de Dios (NP)
  - Representative: Rhea Mae A. Gullas (Lakas)
  - City Council: Members: Rey Anthony L. Lawas; Ma. Bernadith R. Barcenas; Isidro M. Alberca; Vincent Raymund L. Escobido; Michelle Amistad-Zozobrado; Jeson B. Fernandez; Roy O. Velez; Archilles L. Gantuangco; Nicepuro L. Apura; Lorena Mae A. Tabora; Giovanni Quijano ^{‡}; Jhesidy Thea G. Alberca ^{◌}; ‡ ex officio ABC president; ◌ ex officio SK chairman
  - Electorate: 87,040 voters (2025)

Area
  - Total: 116.78 km^{2} (45.09 sq mi)
- Elevation: 97 m (318 ft)
- Highest elevation: 807 m (2,648 ft)
- Lowest elevation: 0 m (0 ft)

Population (2024 census)
  - Total: 140,308
  - Density: 1,201.5/km^{2} (3,111.8/sq mi)
  - Households: 32,075

Economy
  - Income class: 3rd city income class
  - Poverty incidence: 21.61% (2023)
  - Revenue: ₱ 1,004 million (2024)
  - Assets: ₱ 4,425 million (2024)
  - Expenditure: ₱ 434.4 million (2024)
  - Liabilities: ₱ 1,059 million (2024)

Service provider
  - Electricity: Cebu 1 Electric Cooperative (CEBECO 1)
- Time zone: UTC+8 (PST)
- ZIP code: 6019
- PSGC: 072214000
- IDD : area code: +63 (0)32
- Native language: Cebuano

Carcar, officially the City of Carcar (Cebuano: Dakbayan sa Carcar; Filipino: Lungsod ng Carcar), is a component city in the province of Cebu, Philippines. According to the 2024 census, it has a population of 140,308 people.

== History ==
Before Spanish colonization, Carcar was known as "Kabkad" and it was part of area called "Sialo" which was ruled by the Sri Lumay (Rajahmura Lumaya), who had established his kingdom in Cebu Island and ruled from the Singhapala (present-day Mabolo in the north part of Cebu City). Sri Lumay had 4 sons, namely Alho, Ukob, Parang the Limp, and Bantug (father of Rajah Humabon). Sri Alho ruled a land south of Cebu, which was known as Sialo, which included Singhapala to Carcar-Valladolid (on the central east coast of Cebu Island) and beyond up to Santander (southern end of Cebu Island, 200 km from Mabolo).

=== Spanish rule ===
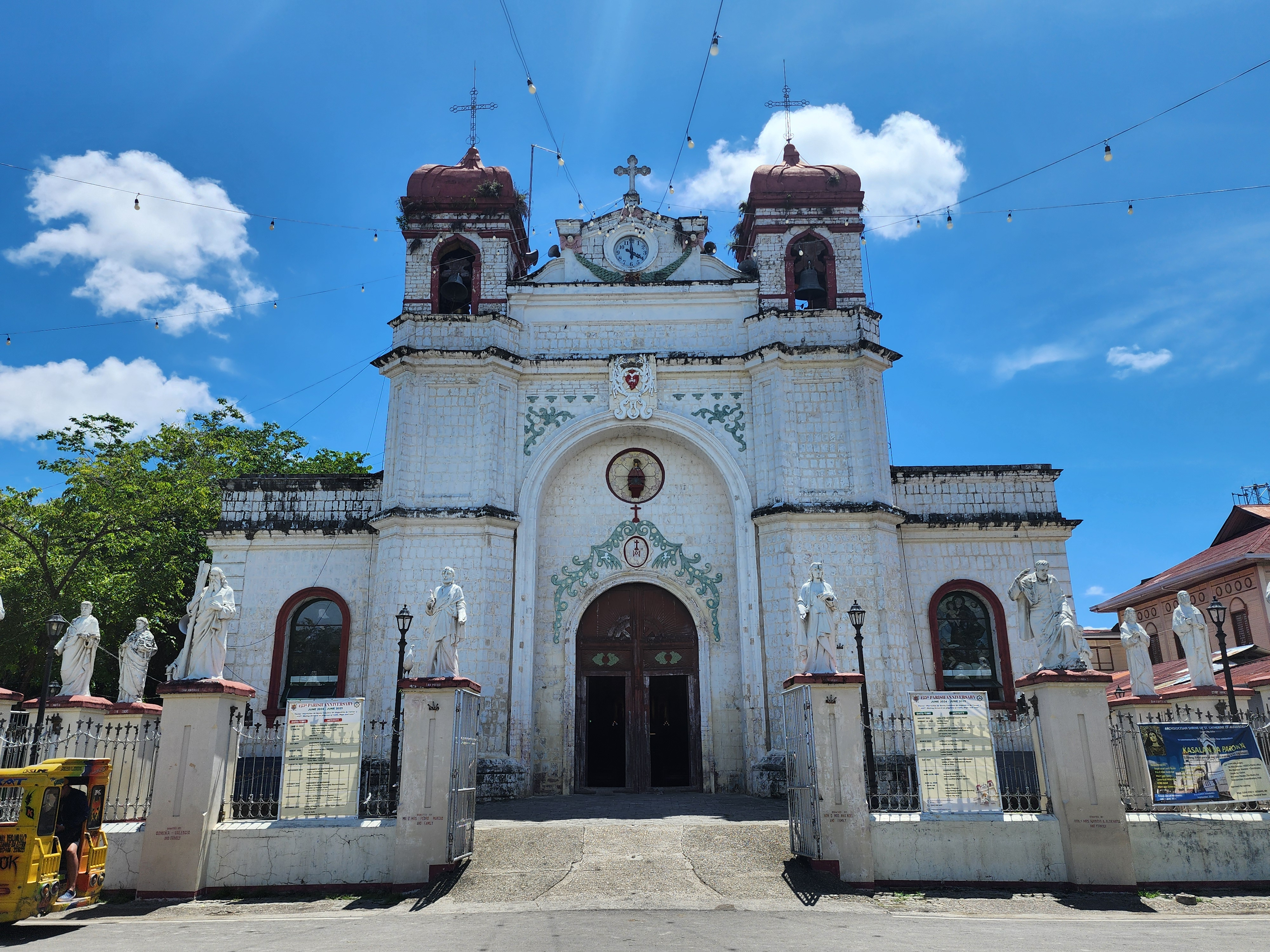
The Parish church of Carcar is an example of Filipino Mudejar Islamic architecture adapted for Christian use.

It became a town in 1599. Carcar is considered one of the oldest towns in Cebu, with its Spanish influence lasting for more than 300 years.

=== World War II and the Koga papers ===
In early April 1944, fishermen Pedro Gantuangko and Rufo Wamar, both residents of Carcar, discovered a wooden box floating off the coast of San Fernando, Cebu after they were alerted to the crash of a Japanese plane at sea. Upon retrieving the box from the shore, they discovered a water-soaked portfolio containing various Japanese-language documents, which they dried for the next two days and kept hidden from Japanese authorities. Gantuangko eventually handed over the documents to local guerrillas, with the papers soon reaching Lt. Col. James M. Cushing. Japanese military officers murdered numerous civilians in their persistent search for the documents, with both Gantuangko and Wamar separately fleeing to Bohol to hide from authorities.

The documents, later named the "Koga papers" after General Mineichi Koga, were picked up by the American submarine USS Crevalle in Negros Oriental and sent to Brisbane, Australia, where it was discovered by General Douglas MacArthur to contain plans called Operation Z that revealed the Japanese' tactics in the Pacific theatre. The papers soon proved crucial to the forming of the Allied plan to liberate the Philippines, pushing the planned Allied invasion of the country to October 1944, two months ahead of schedule.

=== Cityhood ===
In July 2007, the municipality of Carcar was converted into a component city of the province of Cebu after ratification of Republic Act 9436.

On November 18, 2008, Supreme Court ruled that the cityhood charters of Carcar and 15 other cities as unconstitutional as a result of a petition filed by the League of Cities of the Philippines. A year later, on December 22, Carcar and 15 other municipalities regained their status as cities again after the court reversed its November 18, 2008, ruling. On August 23, 2010, the court reinstated its ruling on November 18, 2008, causing Carcar and 15 cities to revert to municipalities. Finally on February 15, 2011, Carcar and the other 15 municipalities regained their cityhood status.

In 2013, after a six-year legal battle, the League of Cities of the Philippines acknowledged and recognized the cityhood of Carcar and 15 other cities on July 19, 2013.

== Geography ==
Carcar City is bordered to the north by the town of San Fernando, to the west are the towns of Barili and Aloguinsan, to the east is the Cebu Strait, and to the south is the town of Sibonga. Carcar is 40 kilometres (25 mi) from Cebu City, 23 kilometres (14 mi) from Barili, and 26 kilometres (16 mi) from Aloguinsan. It has a land area of 116.78 square kilometres (45.09 sq mi).

Carcar lies on the southeastern part of Metro Cebu area.

Topography

The land is generally level with less than 18% slope comprising 78.7% of the total land area. Areas with slopes ranging from 18 to 50% cover 19.3% of the total land area and those over 50% slope comprise approximately 1.9%. The highest recorded elevation is a little over 660 metres (2,170 ft) above sea level, located within the barangay of Napo.

Soil type

The municipality has five dominant soil types namely: Faraon Clay, Steep Phase, the Lugo Clay, the Mandaue clay loam & the Hydrosol type.

=== Barangays ===
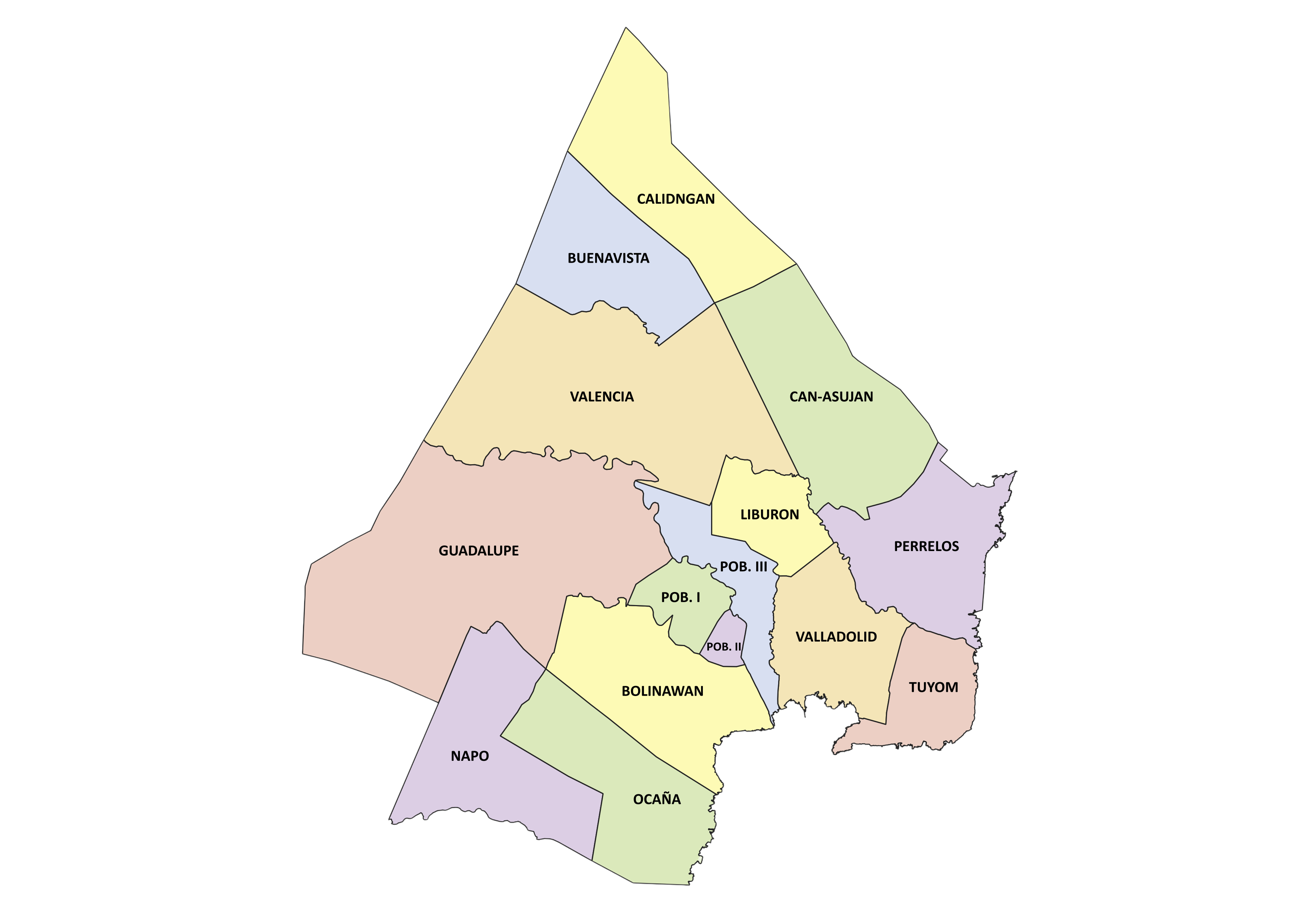
Political map of Carcar

Carcar is politically subdivided into 15 barangays. Each barangay consists of puroks and some have sitios.

| PSGC | Barangay | Population | | | ±% p.a. | |
| | | 2024 | | 2010 | | |
|---|---|---|---|---|---|---|
| 072214001 | Bolinawan | 7.8% | 10,881 | 10,852 | ▴ | 0.02% |
| 072214002 | Buenavista | 1.9% | 2,662 | 2,294 | ▴ | 1.04% |
| 072214003 | Calidngan | 2.3% | 3,258 | 2,953 | ▴ | 0.69% |
| 072214004 | Can‑asujan | 6.5% | 9,114 | 7,845 | ▴ | 1.05% |
| 072214005 | Guadalupe | 9.0% | 12,641 | 10,633 | ▴ | 1.21% |
| 072214006 | Liburon | 5.4% | 7,606 | 6,749 | ▴ | 0.83% |
| 072214007 | Napo | 4.6% | 6,427 | 6,344 | ▴ | 0.09% |
| 072214008 | Ocaña | 6.7% | 9,361 | 8,507 | ▴ | 0.67% |
| 072214009 | Perrelos | 10.1% | 14,129 | 12,901 | ▴ | 0.63% |
| 072214012 | Poblacion I | 7.8% | 10,919 | 8,996 | ▴ | 1.36% |
| 072214013 | Poblacion II | 1.9% | 2,680 | 2,432 | ▴ | 0.68% |
| 072214014 | Poblacion III | 4.9% | 6,898 | 5,763 | ▴ | 1.26% |
| 072214015 | Tuyom | 4.3% | 6,080 | 5,563 | ▴ | 0.62% |
| 072214010 | Valencia | 3.9% | 5,485 | 4,885 | ▴ | 0.81% |
| 072214011 | Valladolid | 8.2% | 11,523 | 10,606 | ▴ | 0.58% |
| | Total | | 140,308 | 107,323 | ▴ | 1.88% |

=== Climate ===
The wet season occurs during the months of June to October and the dry season, from January to May.

Climate data for Carcar, Cebu
| Month | Jan | Feb | Mar | Apr | May | Jun | Jul | Aug | Sep | Oct | Nov | Dec | Year |
|---|---|---|---|---|---|---|---|---|---|---|---|---|---|
| Mean daily maximum °C (°F) | 28 (82) | 29 (84) | 30 (86) | 31 (88) | 31 (88) | 30 (86) | 30 (86) | 30 (86) | 30 (86) | 29 (84) | 29 (84) | 28 (82) | 30 (85) |
| Mean daily minimum °C (°F) | 23 (73) | 23 (73) | 23 (73) | 24 (75) | 25 (77) | 25 (77) | 25 (77) | 25 (77) | 25 (77) | 25 (77) | 24 (75) | 23 (73) | 24 (75) |
| Average precipitation mm (inches) | 70 (2.8) | 49 (1.9) | 62 (2.4) | 78 (3.1) | 138 (5.4) | 201 (7.9) | 192 (7.6) | 185 (7.3) | 192 (7.6) | 205 (8.1) | 156 (6.1) | 111 (4.4) | 1,639 (64.6) |
| Average rainy days | 13.4 | 10.6 | 13.1 | 14.5 | 24.2 | 27.9 | 28.4 | 27.7 | 27.1 | 27.4 | 22.5 | 15.9 | 252.7 |
Source: Meteoblue (Use with caution: this is modeled/calculated data, not measured locally.)

== Demographics ==
Population census of Carcar
| Year | Pop. | ±% p.a. |
|---|---|---|
| 1903 | 31,895 | — |
| 1918 | 37,392 | +1.07% |
| 1939 | 36,308 | −0.14% |
| 1948 | 32,818 | −1.12% |
| 1960 | 36,304 | +0.84% |
| 1970 | 45,806 | +2.35% |
| 1975 | 47,174 | +0.59% |
| 1980 | 57,822 | +4.15% |
| 1990 | 70,841 | +2.05% |
| 1995 | 78,726 | +2.00% |
| 2000 | 89,199 | +2.71% |
| 2007 | 100,632 | +1.68% |
| 2010 | 107,323 | +2.37% |
| 2015 | 119,664 | +2.09% |
| 2020 | 136,453 | +2.80% |
| 2024 | 140,308 | +0.67% |
Source: Philippine Statistics Authority

== Economy ==
Poverty incidence of Carcar (%)

Source: Philippine Statistics Authority

Carcar City relies on local **Agricultural products (farming, livestocks,poultry operations,cut flowers & ornamental gardening, fishing & aquaculture)

  - Local Broadcasting operations
  - Business operations (Department Stores: Gaisano Grand Mall and Super Metro / Supermarkets:SM Savemore)(Hardwares: CitiHardware,Cebu Builders,&etc.)
  - Appliance Stores
  - Banking operations (ChinaBank, MetroBank, Security Bank, RCBC, LandBank,Allied-PNB, and etc.
  - Maritime Training Centers
  - Money Remittances, **Pawnshops
  - Local manufacturing (Footwears and Shoe-making, Pottery & Ceramics,Tinsmith, Basketry, Upholstery, Amakan)
  - Food Industries (corn snacks, chicharon, lechon, ampaw or rice crispies, gorgorias, banana chips, and eateries & carenderias)

== Tourism ==
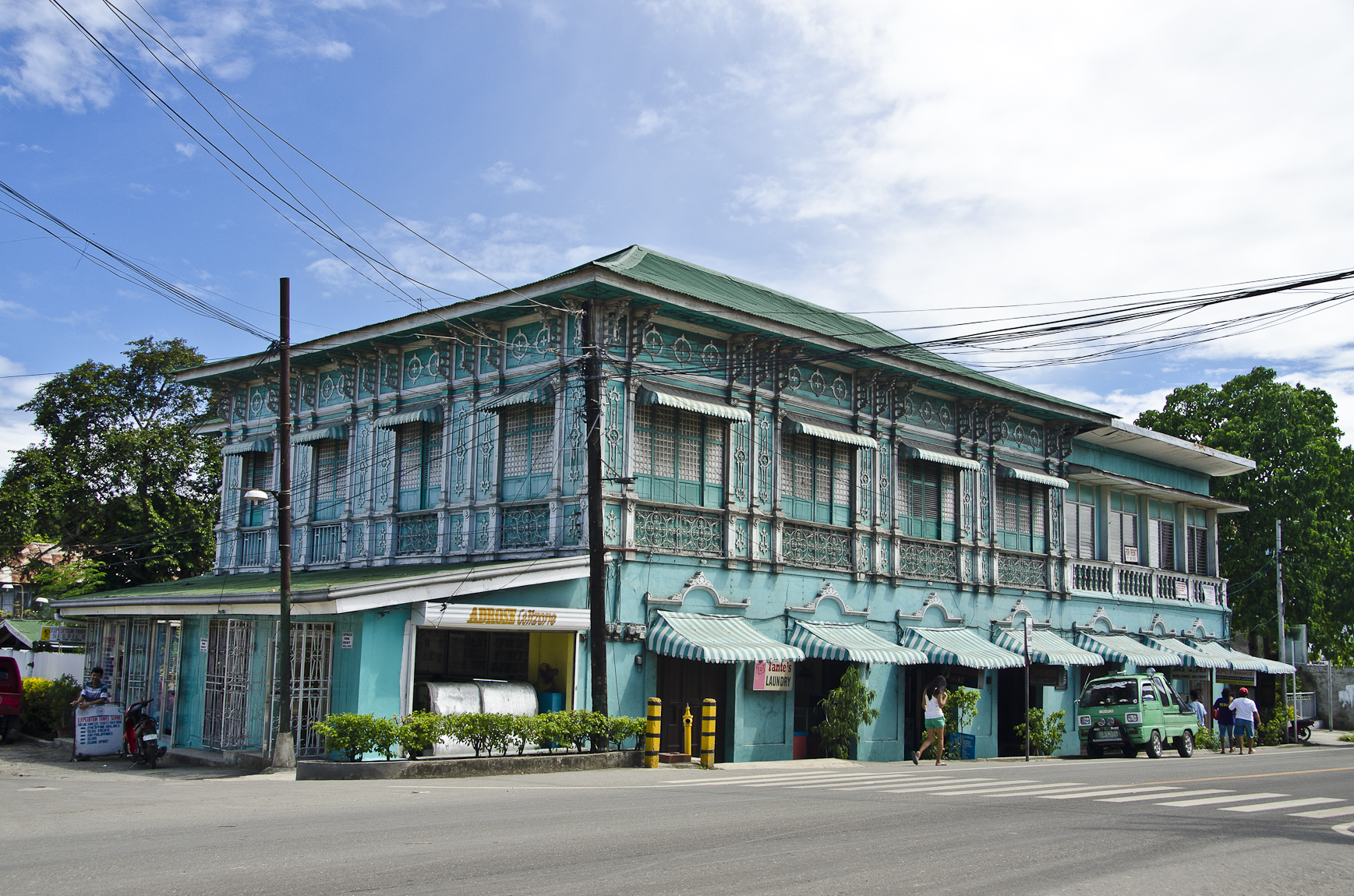
Mercado Ancestral Home

- As a heritage city of Cebu, Carcar contains various Spanish and American period structures. The Carcar plaza alone hosts several heritage structures, the Church of St. Catherine of Alexandria dominates the area. Within the complex various structures stand, including quaint houses and their distinctive architectural details.
- Surrounding the Rotunda and in the public market one will find the famous Carcar chicharon, lechon, ampao, bucarillo, gorgorias and puso – just some of the local delicacies.
- Guadalupe Mabugnao Mainit Hot Spring National Park
- Heritage Houses such as the Mercado Mansion, Balay na Tiesa, Noels Mansion,Mancao’s Mansion, Silva House
- Theotokos Archdiocesan Shrine at Nangkaan Hills, Perrellos
- Sacred Heart Shrine at Upper Katugasan,Can-asujan
- Camari Hills at Calidngan
- Tophills Camping Site, Upper Cogon, Poblacion 1
- Carcar City Peoples Family Park
- Tuyom Beach – Beach Houses
- Bantayan Heritage Watch Tower-Tuyom
- Watch Tower in Bas, Perrelos,Carcar
- Worlds Largest Shoe open air on display at Acacia Grill, Valladolid
- The Carcar Rotunda
- Bolinawan Islet
- Tabyug Mangrove Forest at Sitio Bas,Perrelos
- Sundaze Farm, Valencia
- The Kabkaban Festival, which is the town's local festival in honor of St. Catherine of Alexandria. The name of the festival comes from the old name of the town, which was taken from the local term for the Oakleaf Fern (Aglaomorpha quercifolia) which is abundant in the town, even to this day. Celebrated from the November 23 to 25, it highlights the rich culture, faith, and musical history of Carcar.

== Education ==
The public schools in Carcar are administered by the Schools Division of Carcar City.

=== Elementary schools ===
- Bolinawan ES
- Buenavista ES
- Calidngan ES
- Canal ES—Canal, Bolinawan
- Can-asujan ES
- Cara-atan ES— Cara-atan, Buenavista
- Carcar Central ES- P. Nellas Street,Poblacion 3
- Guadalupe ES
- Hunob ES — Hunob, Guadalupe
- Kalangyawon ES— Kalangyawon, Napo
- Kamanggahan ES-Kamanggahan, Guadalupe
- Kayam ES-Kayam, Napo
- Liburon ES
- Lunas ES- Lunas, Calidngan
- Mainit ES-Mainit, Guadalupe
- Manghupi ES-Manghupi, Can-asujan
- Maximina V. Barangan ES— Upper Cogon,Poblacion I
- Moag ES- Moag, Guadalupe
- Napo ES
- Ocaña Central ES
- Perrelos ES
- Pit-os ES-Pit-os, Calidngan
- Sacsac ES-Sacsac, Calidngan
- Saay ES- Saay,Can-asujan
- Tagaytay ES- Tagaytay, Can-asujan
- Tal-ot ES- Tal-ut, Valencia
- Tapal ES-Tapal, Guadalupe
- Tawog ES-Tawog, Valladolid
- Tuyom ES
- Upland ES- Poblacion I
- Valencia ES
- Valladolid ES

=== High schools ===
- Can-asujan NHS — Can-asujan
- Carcar Central NHS — P. Nellas Street, Poblacion 3
- Gelacio C. Babao, Sr. Memorial NHS — Valladolid
- Kalangyawon NHS— Kalangyawon, Napo
- Liburon NHS - Liburon
- Maximino Noel Memorial NHS— Guadalupe
- Hunob NHS- Guadalupe
- Ocaña NHS— Ocaña
- Perrelos NHS— Perrelos
- Pit-os NHS—Pit-os, Calidngan
- Roberto E. Sato Memorial NHS— Calidngan
- Tagaytay NHS- Tagaytay, Canasujan
- Tal-ut NHS— Tal-ut, Valencia
- Tuyom NHS— Tuyom
- Tuyom SHS(Juana Macalalag MNHS) — Tuyom
- Valencia NVHS— Valencia

=== Integrated Schools ===
- Canal IS-Canal, Bolinawan
- Naximina V. Barangan IS(CarcarCentral NHS Extn)
- Moag IS-Moag, Guadalupe
- Puesto IS — Sitio Puesto, Napo
- Sacsac IS — Sacsac, Calidngan, Carcar City

PRIVATE SCHOOLS:

- Exceed Learning Center-Caipilan,Pob.1
- St.Catherines College
- Mother Mary’s Children School-Dapdap,Pob.3
- St.Teresa’s School-GariettaHeights,Valladolid
- Cebu Sacred Heart College-RamosHeights,Valladolid
- Carcar Academy Tech.School-Pob. 1
- Ocana Learning Center
- St.Elijah Christian Int’l Sch.-Ocana
- Carcar Christian School-Pob.2
- Carcar Bible Baptists Academy-Cambuntan
- Eastside Christian Academy-Inayagan,Tuyom

=== Colleges ===
- Carcar City College — P. Vasquez St., Poblacion I Carcar City
- St.Catherines College - Poblacion 1,Carcar City, Cebu Philippines
- Cebu Sacred Heart College-Ramos Heights ,Valladolid,Carcar City

== Notable personalities ==
- Archbishop Teofilo Bastida Camomot – now a servant of God, founded the religious Congregation Daughters of St.Terese de Avila and the current motherhouse convent is located at Garietta Heights, Valladolid,Carcar City,Cebu
  - Bishop Manuel Porcia Yap - first Carcaranon prelate who translated the holy bible in a Cebuano version,he was the first bishop of Capiz and later assigned to Bacolod…
  - Bishop Sincero Barcenilla Lucero - a prelate of the Diocese of Dipolog
  - Bishop Emiritus Jose Manguiran - assigned prelate at the Diocese of Dipolog and later at the Archdiocese of Ozamis
  - Archbishop Martin Jumoad- prelate of Basilan and currently the Archbishop of Ozamis, although born in Pardo, Cebu City but his mother’s family roots is from Valencia, Carcar City
  - Fr.Anastacio ‘’Padre Tatyong”del Corro - the founder of St. Catherines School now a college, the longest serving parish priest
  - Bro.Ezequiel Barangan - a lay cathechist and a religious founder of the women congregation Siervas Sisters of Nuestra Senora dela Paz (SNSP)
  - Marcelino Navarra- from Sitio Kuasi,Tuyom,Carcar a fiction writer, poet,essayist, editor in chief of Bisaya Magazine hailed as the Father of Modern Cebuano Literature
- Maria Alcordo Cabigon - fondly known as Manding Karya- a renowned Cebuana prolific fiction writer
- Sheryn Regis – recording artists and performer of ASAP and a product of Star in a Million along with Eric Santos
- Harry Gasser - Newscaster and anchor of Balita Ngayon on ABS-CBN from 1969 to 1972. (Carcar City)
- Bong Lapira - a pioneering broadcast journalist, news anchor, and radio personality. He is a veteran commentator of news programs such as Newsbreak on ABS-CBN from 1967 to 1969. (Carcar City)
- Martin Abellana – an author.
- Sinforosa Alcordo - a fiction writer during the pre-war era. (Cebu City)
- Jacinto Alcos - a pre-second world war writer.
- Epifanio Alfafara - writer in the Cebuano language of political and philosophical articles. He used Isco Anino as a pen name. (Carcar City)
- Sergio Alfafara - a writer. He published, authored and translated religious and missal texts in Cebuano. He published a grammar of Cebuano known as Sugboanon nga Gramatika. His pennames included Napoleon Alferez. (Carcar City)
- Martino Abellana "Noy Tinong" - a renowned Cebuano painter and dubbed as "The Dean of Cebuano Painters". His lifetime of works includes portraits, landscapes, and still life glowing in oil, vibrant in pastels, vivid in charcoal, they practically pulsated with life. (Carcar City)
- Romulo Galicano - a painter whose works are technically academic and philosophical in approach. His works are hauntingly reminiscent of the old Filipino Masters with modern sensibilities. (Carcar City)
- Ramon Abellana - a sculptor, his famous sculpture works are the Carcar City Rotunda, the Sergio Osmeña Sr and Lapu-Lapu at the Cebu Provincial Capitol, Humabon in Plaza Hamabar, and another statue of Don Sergio Osmeña Sr. (Carcar City)

== Gallery ==
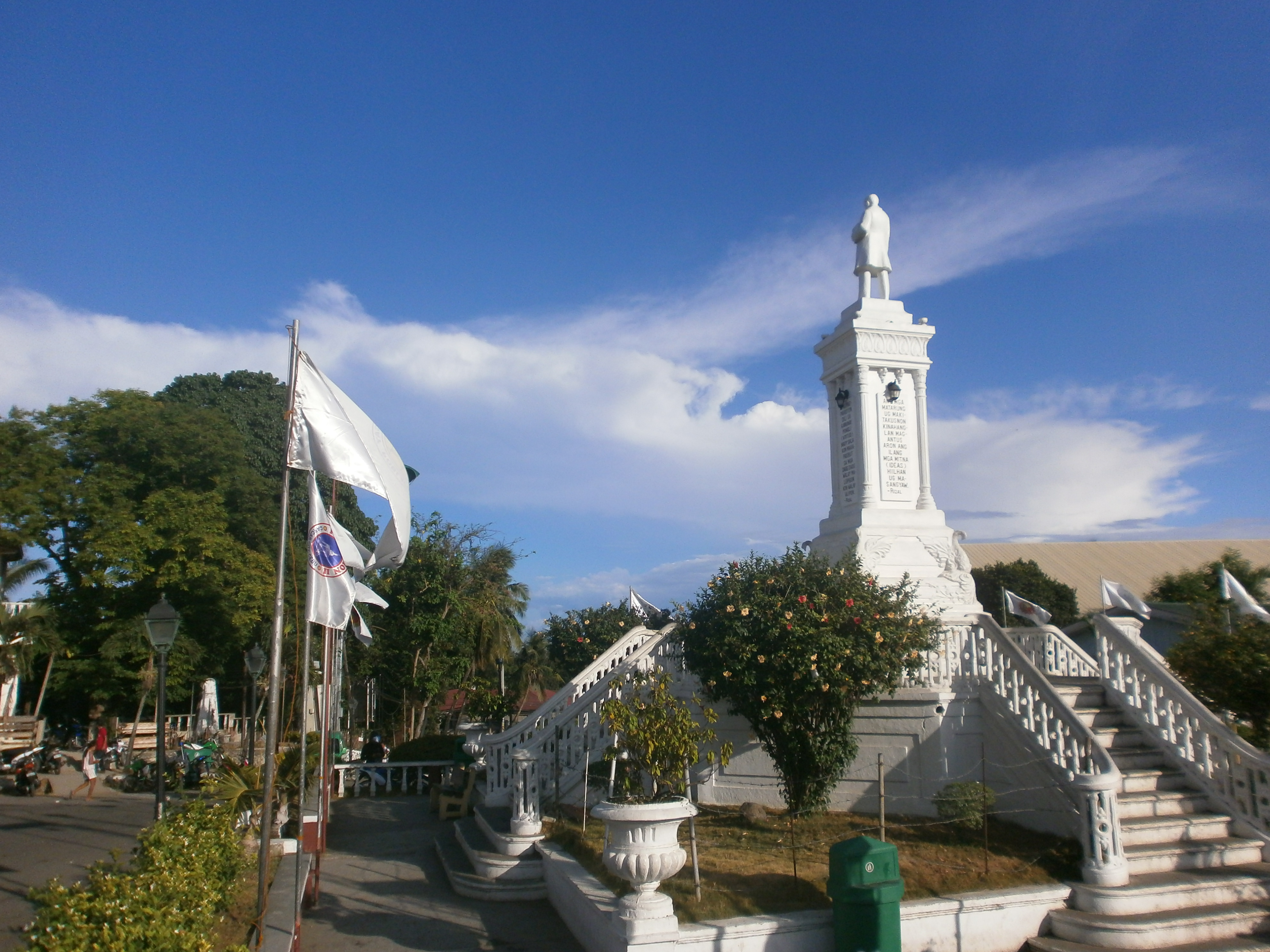
Rizal Monument at Old Town Plaza

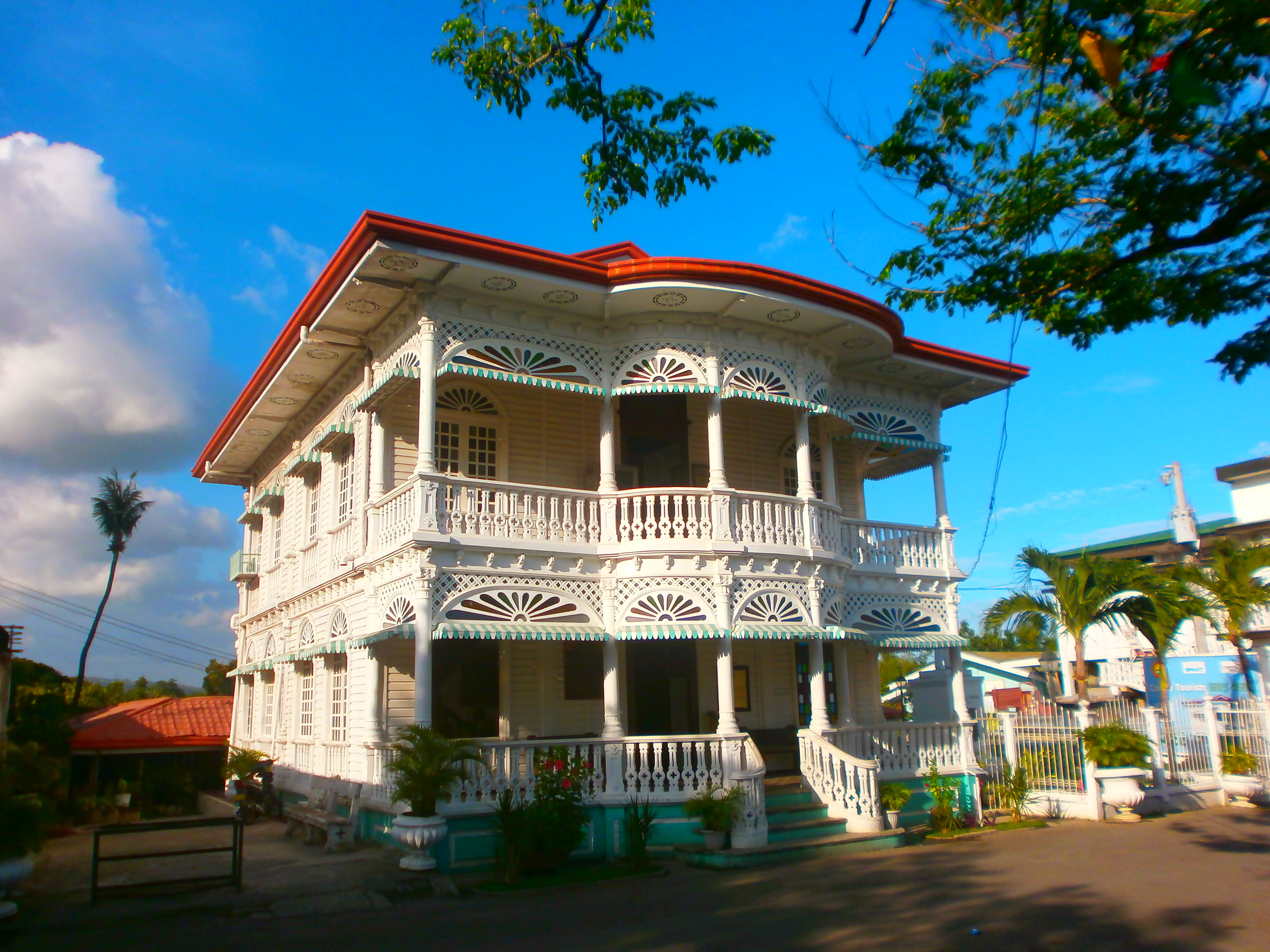
Carcar City Museum (formerly, Carcar Dispensary)

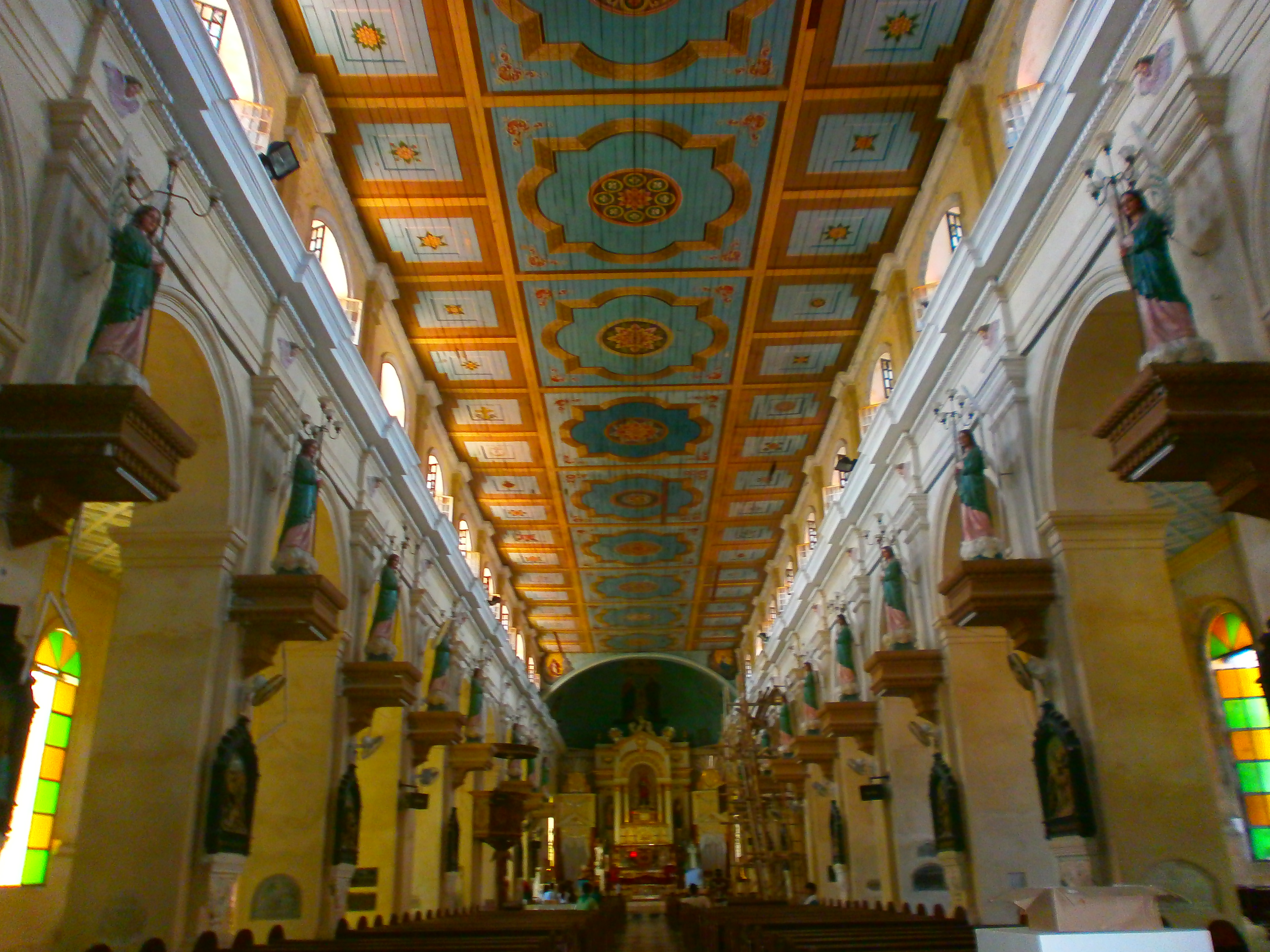
St. Catherine of Alexandria Church Interior

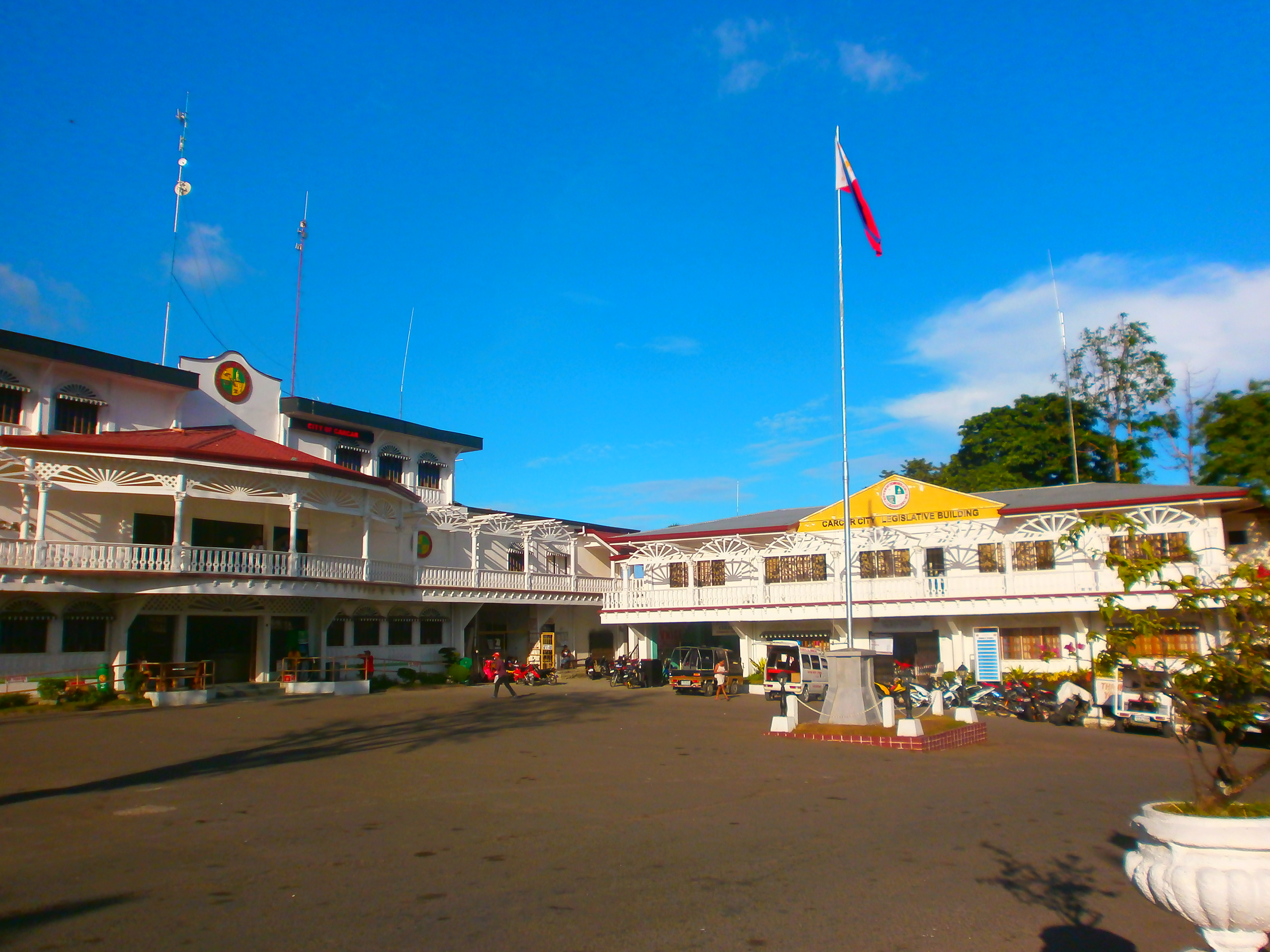
Carcar Former Municipal Complex

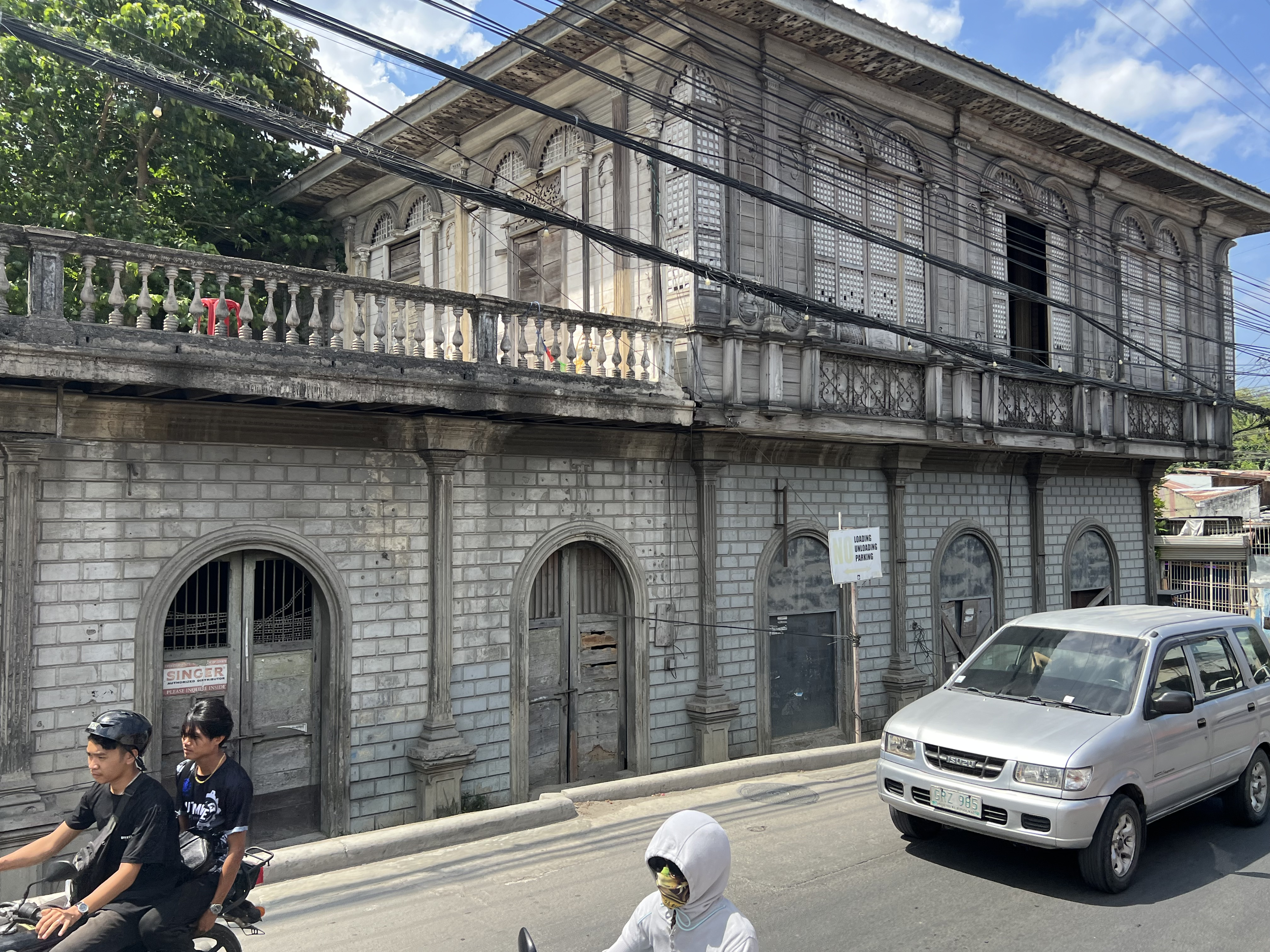
An ancestral house in downtown Carcar

== Sources ==
- Sun–Star (October 8, 2005). "RDC enlarges Metro Cebu". Archived from the original on September 30, 2007.
