= Abellana =

Abellana is a surname. Notable people with the surname include:

- Rey Abellana (born 1962), Filipina actor
- Carla Abellana (born 1986), Filipina actress and model
- Hilario Abellana (1896–1945), Filipino lawyer and politician
- Martin Abellana (1904–1989), Filipino writer
- Martino Abellana (1914–1986), Filipino painter
- Ramon Abellana (born 1911), Filipino sculptor and composer
- Elizabeth Abellana Zimmerman (born 1948), former wife of Rodrigo Duterte and mother of Paolo, Sara and Sebastian Duterte
