= Alfafara (surname) =

Alfafara is a surname. Notable people with the surname include:

- Epifanio Alfafara (1882–1933), Filipino writer
- Sergio Alfafara (1920–?), Filipino writer
- Psalm Alfafara (1980–Present), Filipino designer
