= Alcos =

Alcos is a Spanish surname. Notable people with the surname include:

- David Alcos (born 1967 or 1968), Hawaiian politician
- Jacinto Alcos (fl. early 20th century), Cebuano-language Filipino writer

== See also ==
- Alco
