= Sofronio Mendoza =

Filipino artist (1934-2021)

Sofronio Y. Mendoza
- Born: Sofronio Ylanan Mendoza; March 11, 1934; Cebu, Philippine Islands
- Died: September 21, 2021 (aged 87); Vancouver, Canada
- Education: Colegio de San Jose, Cebu City; University of Santo Tomas; University of the East
- Movement: Realism; Impressionism; Neo-cubism
- Spouse: Elena P. Villanueva
- Children: 7

Signature
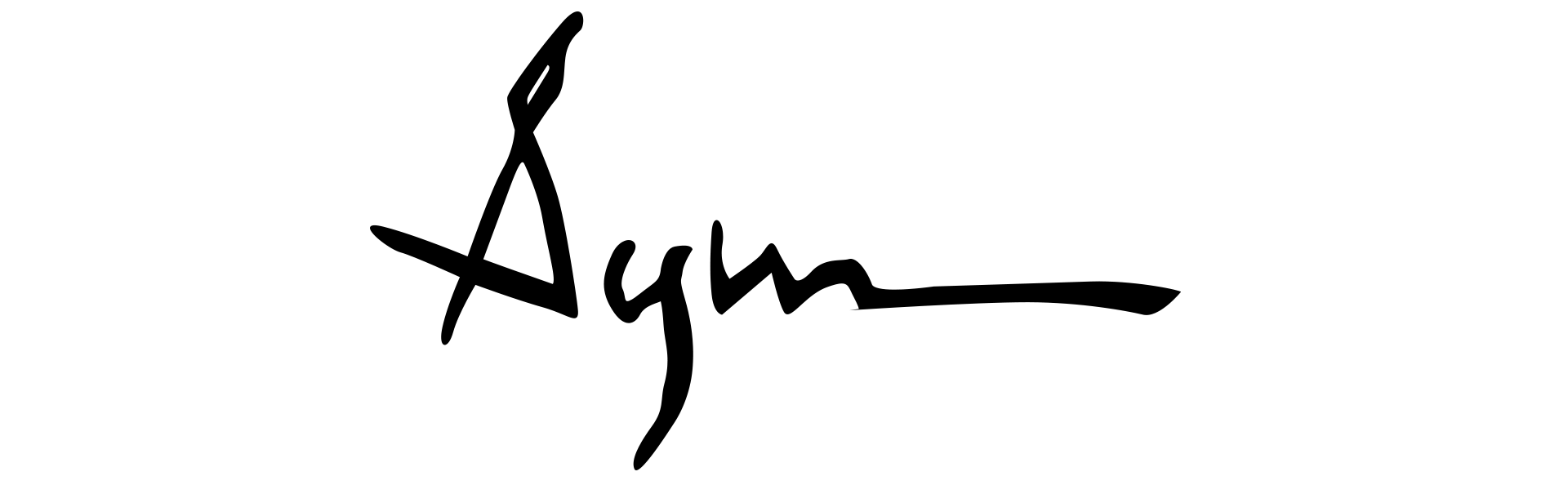

Sofronio Mendoza (March 11, 1934 - September 21, 2021) was a Filipino painter and teacher who mentored young artists in the Philippines and in Canada. He is better known by his monogram SYM he signed his paintings.

== Early life and education ==
Sofronio Ylanan Mendoza was born in the Putat, Bagong Bayan, Cebu in 1934. As a young child, he dreamed of becoming an illustrator being drawn to superheroes in comic books. Specifically, he was fascinated by the line work of Francisco V. Coching. He then managed to hone his skills under the tutelage of renowned Carcar-based Martino Abellana, who Mendoza credited as an early influence in representational painting.

He attended the Colegio de San Jose at Cebu City and through the years, he had been a self-supporting student. In his late twenties, he left Cebu for Manila to further his craft. He became homeless sleeping in Luneta Park. He then found work in Ermita, where he became acquainted with artists in Mabini Street, associated with lowbrow commercial painters who favored "conservative" aesthetics. He managed to eke out a living creating paintings for foreign dealers and tourists. Eventually, he found a patron that would sponsor his formal art studies.

In 1963, he enrolled at the University of Santo Tomas College of Fine Arts and Design in Manila. Later, he transferred to the University of the East's newly opened School of Music and Arts.

== Dimasalang Group ==
Joining plein air painting sessions, Mendoza co-founded the Dimasalang Group of Artists in 1968. The word Dimasalang originated from the pseudonym of Philippine national hero and freedom fighter Dr. Jose Rizal. But the group's name was adopted after the street in Manila, where Mendoza's ramshackle studio on 1430 Dela Fuente, was located. Later on, the Dimasalang group moved to Novaliches but the name stuck to them. The group produced impressionist still lifes, landscapes and genre pieces distinct from the nascent Modernism in the Philippines.

The original members of group besides SYM were journalist-painter E. Aguilar Cruz, Ibarra dela Rosa, Andres Cristobal Cruz and Romulo Galicano, Mendoza's future brother-in-law. He also became a mentor to many young aspiring artists bringing forth Dimasalang II, with which his younger brother Godofredo Mendoza was a member.

In 1981, Mendoza and his family immigrated to Canada. He was offered a four-year contract work by Heffel Gallery on Granville Street, Vancouver. Two months after, he and his wife decided to move to Richmond, BC.

In Canada, he organized the Dimasalang III International Artist Group. He held regular art lessons and led on-the-spot painting sessions.

For decades, SYM was a realist and impressionist artist favoring street scenes and landscapes in his motherland and later in British Columbia. Beginning in 2000, he became a neo-cubist, explaining that it was a return to his roots.

== Personal life ==
Sofronio Y. Mendoza was married to Elena P. Villanueva. They had seven children — Symele, Vilmen, Sovila, Zael, Ronel, Yvi and Eleza — all born in the Philippines. He died in Vancouver on September 21, 2021. He was 87.
