= Mercado Mansion =

- Balay Mercado
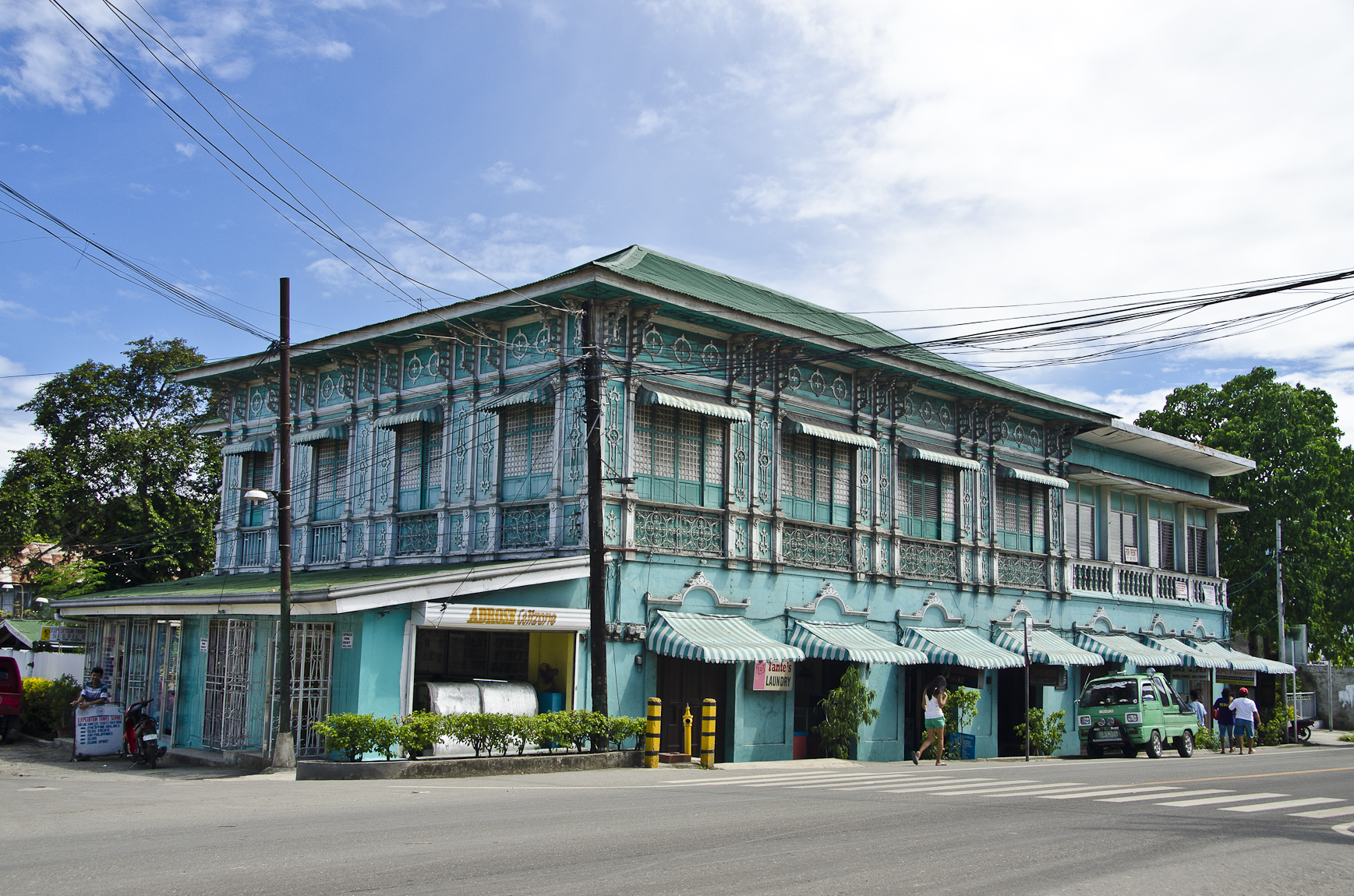
- The Mercado Mansion in Carcar

- Location within Philippines
- Alternative names: Mercado-Lucero Mansion

General information
- Status: Completed
- Type: Mansion
- Architectural style: Bahay na Bato
- Location: Carcar, Cebu, Philippines
- Coordinates: 10°6′16.24″N 123°38′29.01″E
- Completed: 1880s
- Renovated: 1906
- Owner: Mercado-Lucero family

Technical details
- Material: Stone; Brick; Wood
- Floor count: 2

Design and construction
- Designations: Heritage house (29 May 2010 by the National Historical Institute)

The Mercado Mansion is a heritage house located in Carcar, Cebu, Philippines. It is a two-storey bahay-na-bato painted Mediterranean blue owned by the Mercado clan along Cebu South Road. It was declared a Heritage House by the National Historical Commission of the Philippines in 2009.

== History ==
The house is owned by the Mercado clan, an old political family in Carcar. Don Mariano Mercado, American era mayor of Carcar inherited the house. He is originally from Parian in Cebu City. The first level of the house may have been originally built in the 1880s. The second level of the house was added using hardwood in 1906 based on the design and renovation plan of Don Mariano.

Some of the known visitors of the Mercado Mansion are

- American Senator Key Pittman who visited the house in 1931. During the visit of Senator Pittman, then Senate Foreign Relations Chair, Mayor Mercado personally requested him to intercede the talks for Philippine independence from the United States.
- President Ferdinand Marcos who took siesta in the master bedroom of the second floor during a campaign sortie in the 1960s.

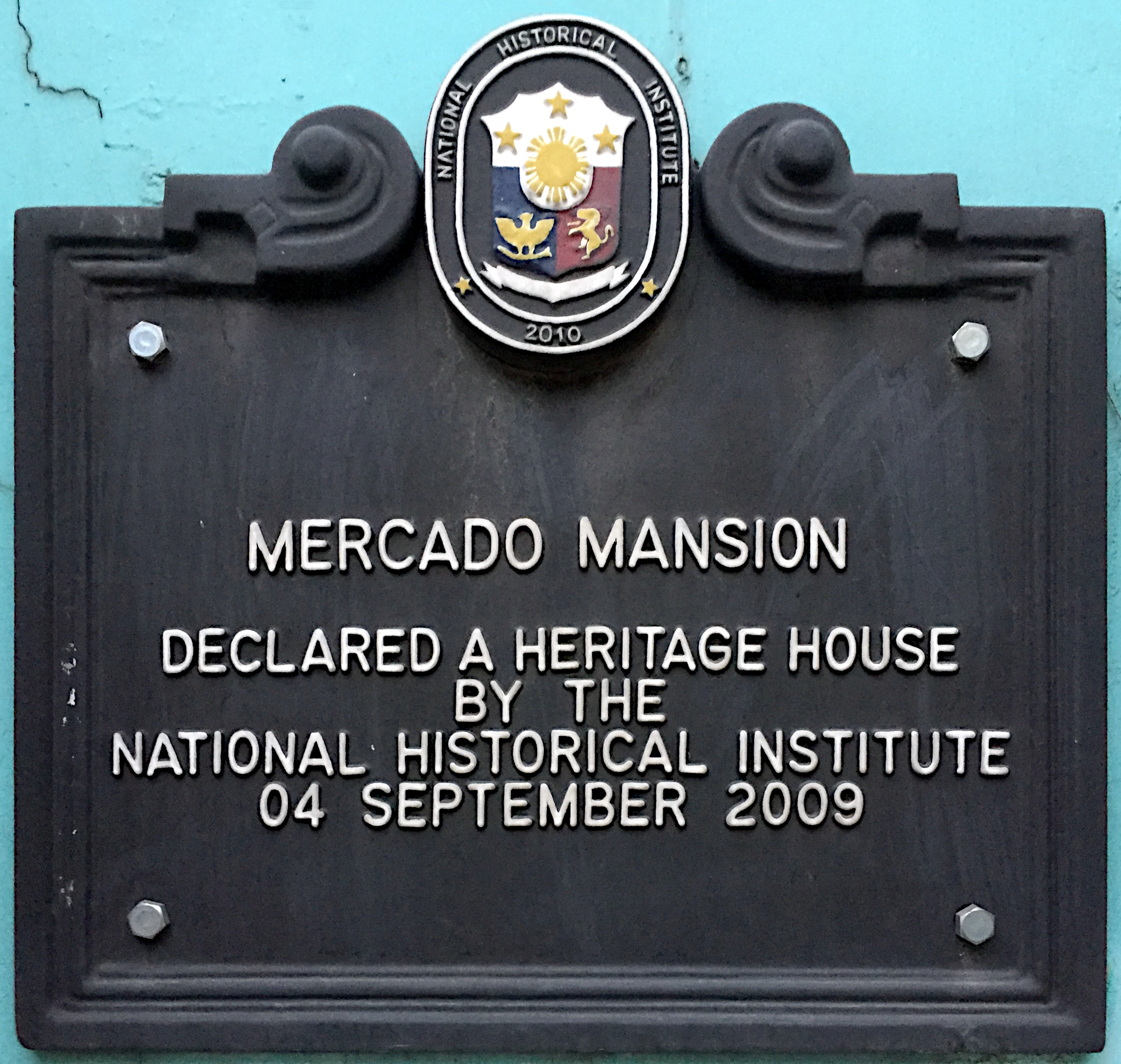
Historical marker unveiled in 2010

In 2009, the National Historical Institute (now National Historical Commission of the Philippines) declared the Mercado Mansion as heritage house pursuant to Resolution no. 10, series of 2009. The unveiling of the marker happened on 29 May 2010 alongside other declared heritage houses in Carcar namely Silva House, Ang Dakong Balay (also Don Florencio Noel Ancestral House) and Balay na Tisa.

== Features ==
The Mercado Mansion is an example of the architectural style during the early 19th century and American colonial period in Carcar.

== Sources ==
- Yamaguchi, Kiyoko (2006). "The New "American" Houses in the Colonial Philippines and the Rise of the Urban Filipino Elite" (PDF). Philippine Studies. 54 (3): 412–451. Archived (PDF) from the original on 24 March 2017.
