= St. Catherine's Church, Carcar =

Roman Catholic church in Cebu, Philippines

Carcar Church
- Archdiocesan Shrine of Saint Catherine of Alexandria
- Saint Catherine de Alexandria Parish Church
- Parroquia de Santa Catalina de Alejandria (Spanish)
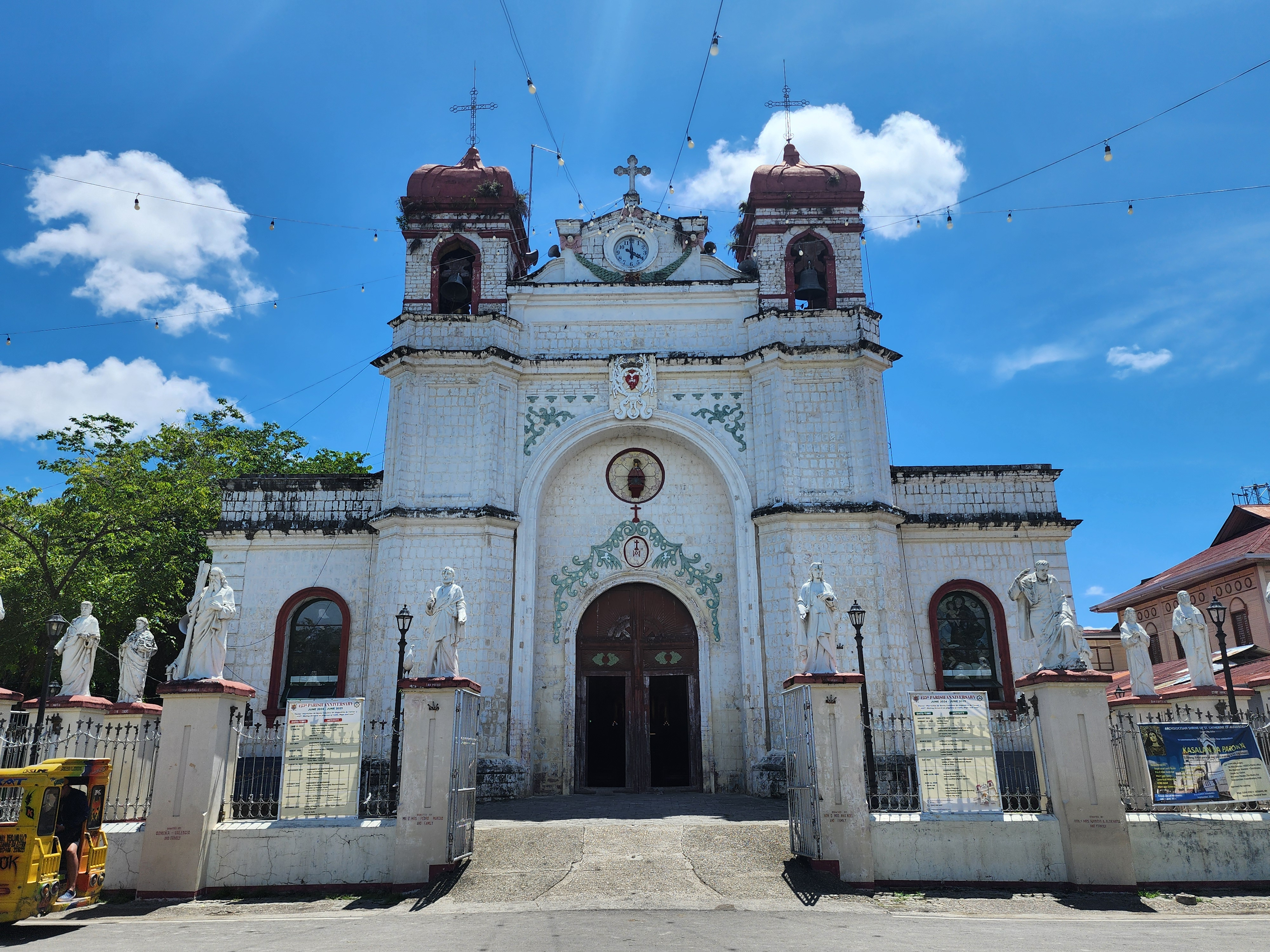
- Church facade in 2024

- Location in Metro Cebu Location in Cebu Location in the Visayas Location in the Philippines
- 10°06′21″N 123°38′25″E
- Location: Carcar, Cebu
- Country: Philippines
- Denomination: Roman Catholic

History
- Dedication: Catherine of Alexandria

Architecture
- Heritage designation: National Cultural Treasure
- Designated: June 27, 2019
- Architectural type: Church building
- Completed: 1860s or 1870s (Note: There are conflicting reports on when the church was built. Some of the claims were: Completed in 1876 and built over a period of 16 years.; Construction started in 1859 and was finished after six years.; Constructed from 1860 to 1875.)

Administration
- Archdiocese: Cebu
- Deanery: St. Catherine of Alexandria
- Parish: St. Catherine of Alexandria

Clergy
- Archbishop: Alberto S. Uy
- Rector: Fr. Miguelito S. Sarmago
- Priest: Fr. John Jonah Orat Fr. Eduardo Cabug Fr. Dennis Acedo

National Cultural Treasures
- Designated: June 27, 2019
- Region: Central Visayas
- Marker Date: November 25, 2023

The Archdiocesan Shrine of Saint Catherine of Alexandria, also known as St. Catherine's Church or Carcar Church, is a Roman Catholic church in Carcar, Cebu, Philippines. It is under the jurisdiction of the Archdiocese of Cebu.

== History ==
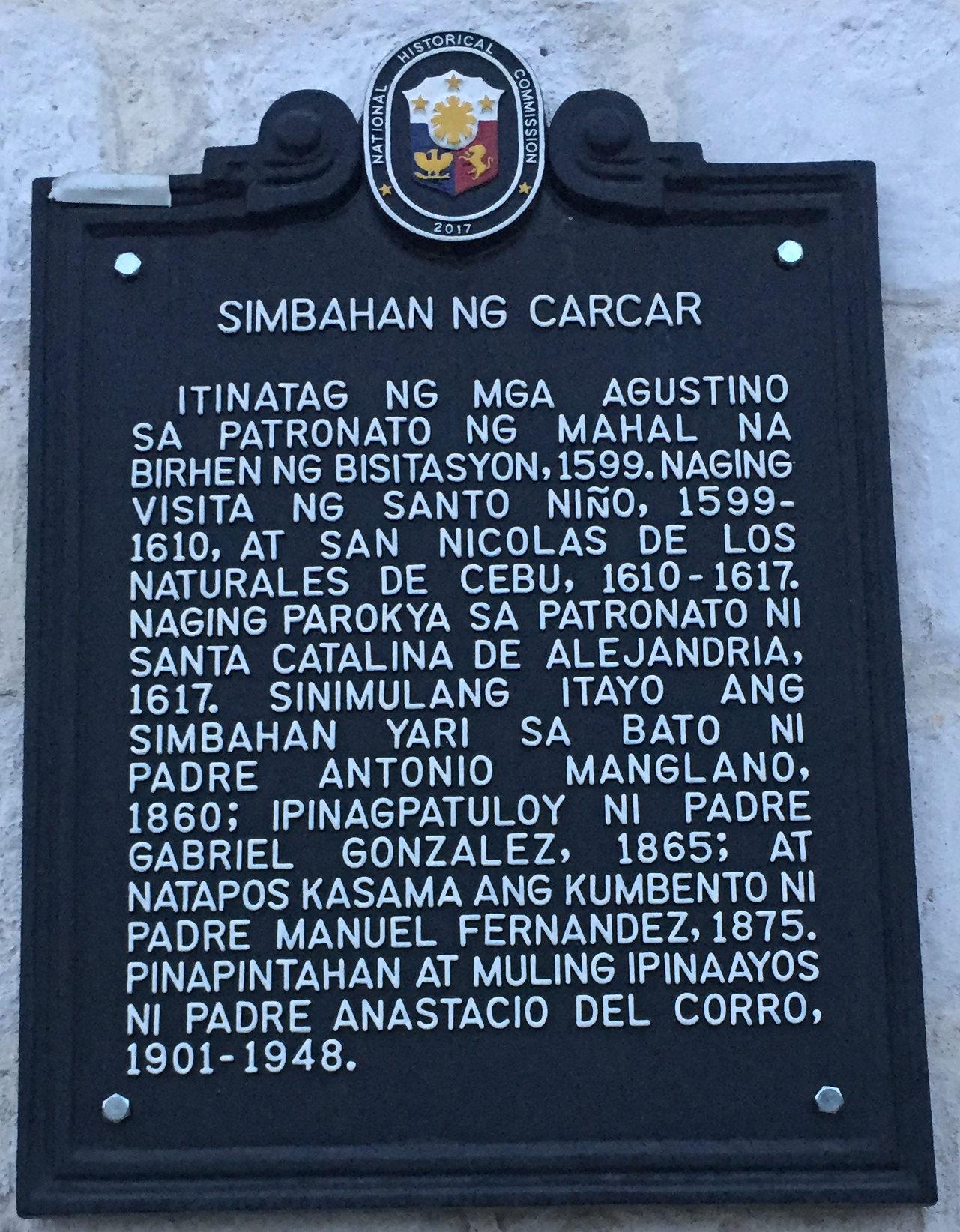
Church NHC historical marker installed in 2017

The settlement of Carcar in Cebu has been covered by a parish since 1599 which was run by the Augustinians. The current Carcar Church was built in sometime in the 19th century. This is around the time when Cebu experienced an economic boom and became a major producer of agricultural goods. The church was named after Carcar's patron saint, Catherine of Alexandria.

== Architecture and design ==
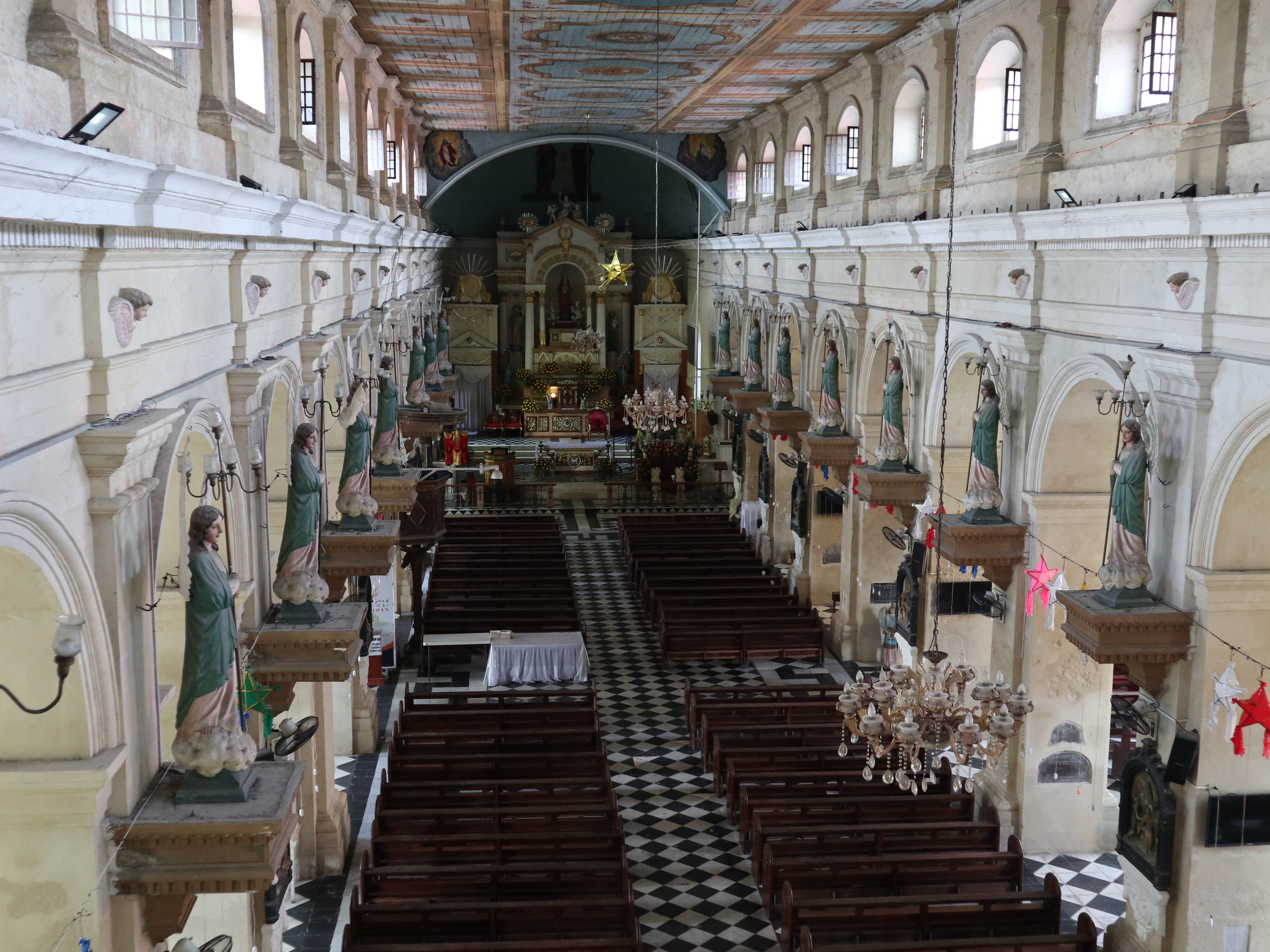
Church interior in 2023

The Carcar Church exhibits the form of a basilica. Its complex also host a separate building which is intended and used as a convent. It is built using coral stones with part of its structure, specifically its upper stories and ceiling made using hardwood. The structure is of mixed architecture style. Parts of the structure exhibit examples of Neo-Mudéjar, Revival Baroque, and Austrian Baroque architecture. Its wooden choir loft is of Gothic Revival character. The church building is also described as having Greco-Roman and Muslim influence. The convent building also has characteristics of the indigenous bahay na bato.

The church's ceiling is decorated by Cebuano artist Canuto Avila which was commissioned by Fr. Anastasio Nuñez del Corro. The ceiling mural was executed from 1910s to the 1920s. The artwork is an example of trompe-l'œil with rosettes as motif rather than featuring a theological subject.
