= Romulo Galicano =

Filipino painter (born 1945)

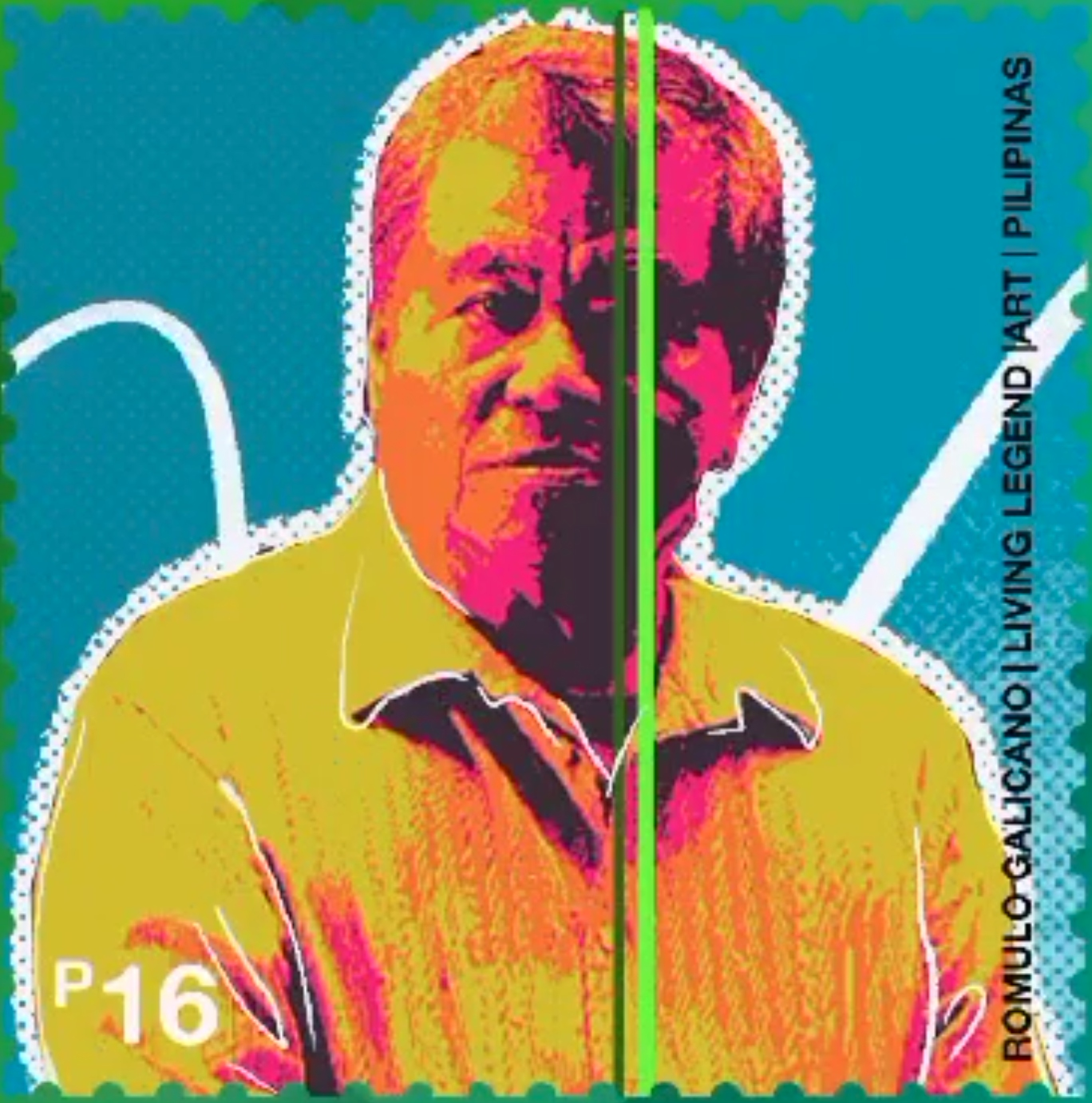
Galicano on a 2022 stamp of the Philippines

Romulo Galicano (born February 4, 1945, in Carcar Cebu) is a Filipino painter whose works are technically academic and philosophical in approach. His works are hauntingly reminiscent of the old Filipino Masters with modern sensibilities. He has mounted numerous one man shows and won various awards. He was on the board of judges for several competitions like in PLDT-DPC Telephone cover 8th visual art national and UST on-the-spot painting competition.

== Life and career ==
Education

Born to a family of artists, Galicano studied painting under his uncle, the Cebuano realist master Martino Abellana from 1961–1965 . In 1965 Galicano arrived in Manila and took up fine arts at the University of the East where he apprenticed under abstract painter Florencio Concepcion who taught him abstract design. Galicano trained further under Sofronio Y. Mendoza. In 1968 he began full-time studies in painting, afterwards he started painting together with the Dimasalang group during 1969–1975.

Affiliations

- Dimasalang Art Group Taza de Oro
- Group of Artist Art Association of the Philippines 1975 Sigliwa Group
- 2001 American Society of Portrait Artists
- 2004 Portrait Society of America
- 2010 Honorary member of PAC (Pasig Art Club)

== Awards and achievements ==
- 2010 – Awarded First Artist of the Year GSIS Museo ng Sining
- 2008 – Parangal Patnubay ng Sining at Kalinangan 437 Araw ng Maynila
- 2005 – Grand Prize Award International Portrait Competition Portrait Society of America, Washington D.C.
- 2005 – Plaque of Recognition For Outstanding Achievements in the Field of Arts and Culture For Carcar Academy, Carcar Cebu
- 2005 – Plaque of Recognition Garbo sa Sugbu, Governor's Night 436 years Anniversary for the province of Cebu
- 2005 – Plaque of Recognition in the Field of Art Municipality of Carcar Cebu
- 2005 – First Congressional Awards in the Field of Arts, 1st District of Cebu
- 2004 – Awards of Merit International Portrait Competition, Portrait Society of America, Boston Massachusetts
- 2004 – Appointed Honorary National Vice President for the PhilippinesBy: Ordine Accadimico Internazionale Vinzaglio, Italy
- 2003 – Plaque of Recognition for exemplary achievements in the Field of Paintings S.C.C. Night Carcar Cebu
- 1999 – 12th Perlas Award on the Valuable Filipino, Cebu City
- 1998 – Awarded the Highest Title of Ordinary Academician (Department: Arts) By: Accademia Internazionale – Greci Marino Accademia Del Verbano, Italy
- 1998 – Awarded the Highest Title of Academical knight for the Grand Cross (Department: Arts) By: Ordine Accadimico Internazionale Vinzaglio, Italy
- 1994 – 3rd Prize 1st Philip Morris Art Competition

== Art exhibits ==
- 1972 ⎯ 1st One Man Show – Hidalgo Gallery, Makati
- 1973 ⎯ 2nd One Man Show – Gallery One, San Juan
- 1974 ⎯ 3rd One Man Show – Gallery One, San Juan
- 1975 ⎯ 4th One Man Show – Gallery One, San Juan
- 1976 ⎯ 5th One Man Show – ABC Galleries, Manila
- 1979 ⎯ 6th One Man Show – ABC Galleries, Manila
- 1980 ⎯ 7th One Man Show – Ali Mall, Quezon City
- 1981 ⎯ 8th One Man Show – Gallery Bleue, Makati
- 1982 ⎯ 9th One Man Show – Ali Mall, Quezon City
- 1982 ⎯ 10th One Man Show – Hidalgo Gallery, Makati
- 1990 ⎯ 11th One Man Show – Osmeña Museum, Cebu
- 1991 ⎯ 12th One Man Show – Finale Gallery, Makati
- 1994 ⎯ 13th One Man Show – SM Art Center, Cebu
- 1994 ⎯ 14th One Man Show – Ayala Museum, Makati
- 2000 ⎯ 15th One Man Show – SM Mega Mall Art Center, Quezon City
- 2000 ⎯ 16th One Man Show – SM Art Center, Cebu
- 2008 ⎯ 17th One Man Show – Metropolitan Museum, Manila
- 2008 ⎯ 18th One Man Show – SM Art Center, Cebu
- 2011 ⎯ 19th One Man Show – Siete de Agosto: Allegory of a Farce – Tall Gallery, Finale Art File

Group Shows

- Several major group shows including Ako, self-portrait from the 1800 to the Present at the Metropolitan Museum of Manila, 1995
- World Trade Center Singapore Asean Art Competition, 1994
- Tapestry of the Filipino Soul, Group painting exhibition by Ten outstanding Filipino artists, Galerie E, Hong Kong, 2001
- Homage to the Master with Kitkat, Glorietta Art Center, Makati, 2001
- Homage to the Master 2, Metropolitan Museum, Makati, 2002
- Ode to the Pasig River, Ayala Museum, Makati, 2006
- Contemporary Filipino Impressionists, The Edge Gallery, UP Vargas Museum, 2007
- "Postura", Painting by Romulo Galicano, and Dolls by Patis Tesoro, Metropolitan Museum, 2008
- "Postura", Painting by Romulo Galicano, and Dolls by Patis Tesoro, SM Cebu, 2008
- Artlink Cebu – Manila Artists Group Exhibit Casino Español, Cebu City, 2008
- Dimasalang Artists Celebrating 40 Years, SM Megamall Art Center, 2009
- Cebu Art Festival, SM Cebu City, 2010
- Bag-ong HInan-aw (The New Perspective) Group Art Exhibit, SM Cebu City, 2010
- Re-collect: Revisiting The Metropolitan Museum Collection Tall Galleries, Oct. 9, 2009 – April 24, 2010
- Altromondo Group Show, Arte Contemporaneo, 2010
- NCCA – "Sinang Pasig" Bagong Pananaw, 2010
- "Pasinaya" Alay sa Mutya Artistree Gallery, 2011

== Bibliography ==
- http://romulogalicano.com/biography.html.Romulo Galicano .2011. Romulo Galicano. Ink Elephant Studio. Retrieved 2015
