= Ramon Abellana =

Filipino painter

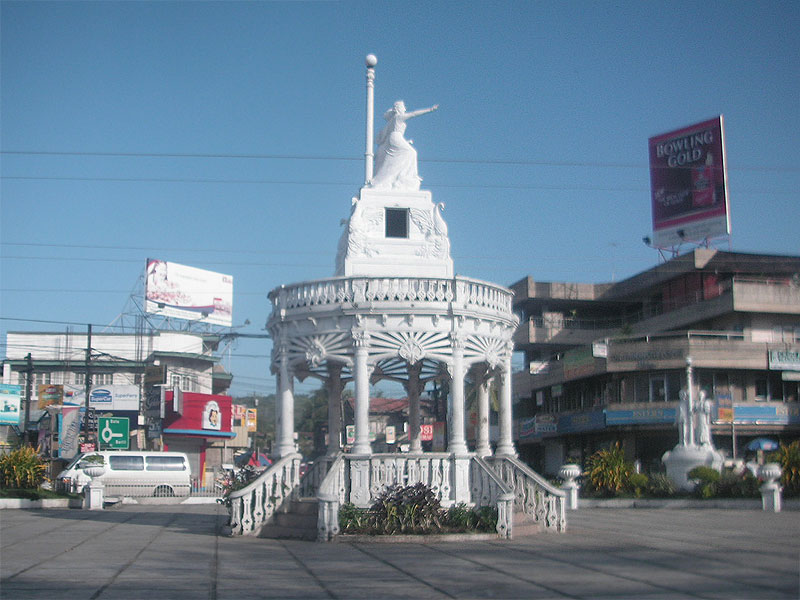
Rotunda

Dr. Ramon Alcoseba Abellana (February 5, 1911 – November 5, 2001) was a Cebuano sculptor and composer from Carcar. He learned sculpture from his grandfather, Gonzalo and from his father, Teofilo, who was also a school principal and sculptor. He pursued dentistry as a profession. He compared making dental impressions to sculpting. An artist by heart, apart from practicing his dental profession, he was also making sculptures. His first commissioned work was the Carcar landmark, "Rotunda" based on the sketches of his brother, Martino Abellana. Together with his brother, Manuel, he sculpted the figures. He also carved two life-sized statues: Lapu-lapu and Sergio Osmeña Sr., that can be seen at the grounds of Cebu City Capitol.

His passion for music inspired him to compose several Visayan songs such as Kwahaw, Saloma, Katahum sa Yamog (How Lovely the Morning Dew) and Lapiyahan.

== See also ==
- Martino Abellana
