= Epifanio Alfafara =

Epifanio Alfafara (1882–1933) was a Filipino Visayan writer in the Cebuano language of political and philosophical articles. He used Isco Anino as a pen name.

Alfafara was a native of Carcar. He translated Ang Dose Pares sa Pransiya into Cebuano. His son, Sergio Alfafara, was also a noted Cebuano writer.
