= Sinforosa Alcordo =

Cebuano fiction writer

Sinforosa Alcordo was a Cebuano fiction writer during the pre-War era.
