= Martino Abellana =

Filipino painter (1914–1988)

Martino Abellana (1914–1988), known as "Noy Tinong", was a renowned Cebuano painter from Carcar. Dubbed "The Dean of Cebuano Painters", he was born to an artistic family. His main influence was his father, who was a school principal and a sculptor. Martino, along with his four brothers, including renowned sculptor and composer Dr. Ramon Abellana, were exposed to art early, and they helped their father with his sculptures.

== Career ==
Martino pursued a career in the arts, finishing his formal art education at the School of Fine Arts of the University of the Philippines Manila. Among his teachers were the famous masters Fernando Amorsolo and Guillermo Tolentino. As an undergraduate, he helped his brother Ramon conceptualized the famous Carcar landmark, "Rotunda," by making sketches.

Martino Abellana lived, worked and taught in Cebu, despite graduating with his degree in the fine arts in Manila. He facilitated the local development of art in Cebu together with his contemporary painter and friend Professor Julian Jumalon, and helped found the fine arts program at University of the Philippines College Cebu, where he left his greatest legacy by influencing an entire generation of Cebuano painters.

== Works ==
His lifetime of works includes portraits, landscapes, and still life glowing in oil, vibrant in pastels, vivid in charcoal, they practically pulsated with life.

Perhaps one of his most recognized works, "The Bystander", is in the collection of the Ateneo Art Gallery. The painting portrays a somber scene of a working-class man standing behind a shanty-type dwelling called "barong-barong". Abellana's depiction confronts the realities of living in poverty, but far from appearing helpless, the look on the subject's face appears disappointed by the situation but remains resilient with pride. Most paintings in his body of work highlight social-realist perspectives in depicting the struggle of the times. He almost always positioned human figures in the foreground behind natural landscapes and seascapes in lighter palettes or urban scenes but in more subdued colors.

Abellana's style is regarded to be the foundation of "Sugbuanon Realism”, a term used by critic and art historian Prof. Raymund Fernandez to describe practices that descend from traditional and academic painting as exemplified by generations of artists documenting reality through landscapes, portraits, and unembellished depictions of life. Generations of Cebuano painters have referenced Abellana's practice and ouvre as a precursor to what Cebuano curator Jay Jore calls as "Contemporary Bisaya Realism", which was adapted from Fernandez’s more specific classification of generations of Cebuano artists following the paths of masters such as Fernando Amorsolo, Martino Abellana, Sofronio Y. Mendoza and Romulo Galicano. However, Jore argues that the movement does not simply draw from tradition but “rather follows a particular way of looking and relating to the artwork’s subject as it corresponds to reality”. He adds, “style becomes only a metaphor that captures the aura of things as they are being gazed upon by the painter.” and cites the case of Abellana as his “use of impressionist brushwork, at times exuding rather expressionistic and abstractive energy does not limit the Bisaya painter to the techniques of academism that were taught in formal art schools.” Jore continues, “Contemporary Bisaya Realism then is about the artist’s reliance on his or her ability to mediate the nuance of reality on the surface of the canvas. It is a dedicated and committed gazing of reality, highly focused on capturing the essence of form and the aura of its appearance despite the temptation to idealize, abstract, or simplify. It is an insistence and stubbornness to record reality as it appears before one’s eyes.”

== See also ==
- Dr. Ramon Abellana
- Carcar, Cebu
