= Jacinto Alcos =

Jacinto Alcos is a pre-Second World War Cebuano writer.

== Novel ==
- Handurawan (Recollections), an escapist adventure novel.
