= Martin Abellana =

Filipino writer (1904–1989)

Martin Abellana (1904–1989) was a Filipino Visayan writer. He was a teacher by profession. In the years 1956 to 1958, he was president of the LUDABI, a group of writers in Cebuano. His novels are characterized by a concern for the working class. Abellana is one of the Cebuano writers featured by National Artist Resil Mojares in his 1975 book “Cebuano Literature.”

== Novels ==
- Kaulit sa Kalipay
- Ang Kalayo sa Sulad
- Tulisok sa Tanlag
- Basuni sa Katingala
- Awit sa Gugma
- Kinabuhi
