= Sergio Alfafara =

Cebuano Visayan writer

Sergio R. Alfafara (born July 27, 1920, date of death unknown) was a Filipino Cebuano Visayan writer. A parish priest, he published, authored and translated religious and missal texts in Cebuano. He published a grammar of Cebuano known as Sugboanon nga Gramatika. His pennames included Napoleon Alferez. His father, Epifanio Alfafara, was also a noted Cebuano writer. Alfafara is deceased.
