= 2024 Cebu F.C. season =

Dynamic Herb Cebu
2024 season
- Owner: Uğur Taşçı
- Head Coach: Memiş Özata
- Stadium: Dynamic Herb Sports Complex
- Philippines Football League: 2nd
- All statistics correct as of July 7, 2024.

The 2024 season will be Dynamic Herb Cebu's 2nd season in the Philippines Football League and 3rd in the Copa Paulino Alcantara since first forming and making their professional debut in 2021.

Last season, Cebu finished second in the 2022–23 Philippines Football League in their debut season after United City unexpectedly withdrew, which saw the club qualify for AFC competitions for the very first time. In the AFC Cup, they finished third in their group, having gotten a historic first-ever win over Myanmar's Shan United as well as losses to Australia's Macarthur FC and Cambodia's Phnom Penh Crown. However, the club crashed out in the semi-finals of the 2023 Copa Paulino Alcantara after losing to then-non-league side Davao Aguilas. The club sacked head coach Joshua Schirmer and brought in Turkish coach Memiş Özata as well as the returning Levent Öztürk. After managing to retain most of its local core, the club replaced its departing foreign players with players largely of Dutch and Surinamese nationalities, such as winger Zamoranho Ho-A-Tham and midfielder Guytho Mijland.

== Squad ==
As of 29 March 2024

Squad No.	Name	Nationality	Date of birth (age)	Previous club
Goalkeepers
1	Florencio Badelic Jr.	(Philippines)	22 May 1994 (age 31)	(Philippines) United City
25	Nathanael Villanueva	(Philippines)	25 October 1995 (age 30)	(Philippines) Kaya–Iloilo
66	Yusuf Çekiç	(Netherlands) (Turkey)	5 July 1995 (age 30)	(Netherlands) Barbaros Hengelo
99	Jack Zambrano	(Philippines)	18 February 2000 (age 25)	University of the Philippines
Defenders
3	Charles Dabao	(Philippines)	30 September 1997 (age 28)	(Philippines) University of St. La Salle
4	Kamil Amirul	(Philippines)	6 February 2004 (age 21)	(Philippines) Cebu FC Academy
7	Evren Tasci	(Philippines) (Turkey)	1 September 1997 (age 28)	(Philippines) Leylam Cebu
12	John Saldivar	(Philippines)	3 May 1998 (age 27)	(Philippines) Far Eastern University
14	Jaime Rosquillo	(Philippines)	10 March 2003 (age 22)	(Philippines) Azkals Development Team
18	Erich Orale	(Philippines)	—	(Philippines) University of Santo Tomas
32	Elijah Liao	(Philippines)	14 September 1999 (age 26)	(Philippines) Azkals Development Team
37	Göktuğ Demiroğlu	(Turkey)	21 May 1999 (age 26)	(Spain) Zalla UC
Midfielders
6	Daniel Gadia	(Philippines)	3 July 1995 (age 30)	(Philippines) Stallion Laguna
8	Jeremiah Borlongan	(Philippines)	8 December 1998 (age 27)	University of the Philippines
13	Baris Tasci	(Philippines) (Turkey)	21 December 1998 (age 27)	(Philippines) Leylam Cebu
15	Glen Ramos	(Philippines)	—	(Philippines) University of Santo Tomas
17	Yoji Selman	(Philippines)	17 April 2003 (age 22)	(Philippines) Cebu FC Academy
20	Roberto Corsame Jr.	(Philippines)	14 December 1996 (age 29)	(Philippines) Kaya–Iloilo
45	Rhino Goutier	(Philippines) (Netherlands)	9 May 2003 (age 22)	(Netherlands) Den Bosch
47	Guytho Mijland	(Netherlands) (Suriname)	27 July 1996 (age 29)	(Greece) Eordaikos
80	Marius Koré	(Ivory Coast)	1 September 1999 (age 26)	(Philippines) Leylam Cebu
Forwards
9	Kintaro Miyagi	(Philippines)	14 April 1998 (age 27)	University of the Philippines
10	Zamoranho Ho-A-Tham	(Suriname) (Netherlands)	7 March 1996 (age 29)	(Germany) FC Karbach
11	Chima Uzoka	(Philippines) (Nigeria)	12 June 1998 (age 27)	(Philippines) Stallion Laguna
19	Devrim Ali Yanık	(Turkey)	3 September 2004 (age 21)	(Turkey) Çarşambaspor
21	Rintaro Hama	(Japan)	18 May 1999 (age 26)	(Japan) Kōchi University
77	Abou Sy	(Senegal)	2 February 1996 (age 29)	(Philippines) Kaya–Iloilo

== Transfers ==
Note: Flags indicate national team as defined under FIFA eligibility rules. Players may hold more than one non-FIFA nationality.

=== In ===
Date	Pos.	Nat.	Name	From	Ref.
Pre-season
February 22	MF	(Netherlands)	Guytho Mijland	(Greece) Eordaikos	
March 20	FW	(Senegal)	Abou Sy	(Philippines) Kaya–Iloilo	
March 20	DF	(Philippines)	Kamil Amirul	(Philippines) Cebu FC Academy	
March 20	MF	(Philippines)	Glen Ramos	(Philippines) University of Santo Tomas	
March 20	FW	(Turkey)	Devrim Ali Yanık	(Turkey) Çarşambaspor	
March 21	GK	(Netherlands)	Yusuf Çekiç	(Netherlands) Barbaros Hengelo	
March 21	MF	(Philippines)	Yoji Selman	(Philippines) Cebu FC Academy	
March 21	FW	(Suriname)	Zamoranho Ho-A-Tham	(Germany) FC Karbach	
March 21	DF	(Philippines)	Erich Orale	(Philippines) University of Santo Tomas	

=== Loaned in ===
Date	Pos.	Nat.	Name	Loaned from	On loan until	Ref.
Pre-season
March 14	MF	(Philippines)	Rhino Goutier	(Netherlands) Den Bosch	Until end of season	

=== Out ===
Date	Pos.	Nat.	Name	To	Ref.
Pre-season
January 15	MF	(Japan)	Ryoo Togashi	(Hong Kong) Southern District	
February 28	FW	(Philippines)	Ivan Ouano	(Philippines) United City	
March 7	DF	(Japan)	Ren Okuda	Free agent	
March 13	FW	(Turkey)	Arda Çınkır	Free agent	
March 13	FW	(Japan)	Ken Murayama	Free agent	

== Preseason and friendlies ==
Win Draw Loss

== Competitions ==
=== Overview ===
Competition	First match	Last match	Starting round	Final position	Record							
Competition	First match	Last match	Starting round	Final position	Pld	W	D	L	GF	GA	GD	Win %
Philippines Football League	May 5, 2024	July 13, 2024	Matchday 1	2nd	14	12	0	2	66	9	+57	85.71
Total					14	12	0	2	66	9	+57	85.71

Last updated: July 13, 2024
Source: Competitions

=== Philippines Football League ===
==== Standings ====
Pos	Team	Pld	W	D	L	GF	GA	GD	Pts	Qualification
1	Kaya–Iloilo (Note: Assured a place in the AFC Champions League Two Group stage as 2023 Copa Paulino Alcantara Winners) (C)	14	13	1	0	82	5	+77	40	Qualification for 2024–25 AFC Champions League Two Group stage
2	Dynamic Herb Cebu	14	12	0	2	66	9	+57	36	Qualification for 2024–25 AFC Champions League Two Group stage
3	Stallion Laguna	14	10	2	2	65	12	+53	32	
4	Davao Aguilas	14	10	2	2	39	6	+33	32	
5	One Taguig	14	9	4	1	69	14	+55	31	
6	United City	14	9	3	2	51	13	+38	30	

Source: PFL
Rules for classification: 1) Points; 2) Goal difference; 3) Goals scored.
(C) Champions
Notes:

Results summary

Overall								Home						Away					
Pld	W	D	L	GF	GA	GD	Pts	W	D	L	GF	GA	GD	W	D	L	GF	GA	GD
14	12	0	2	66	9	+57	36	9	0	1	55	6	+49	3	0	1	11	3	+8

Last updated: July 4, 2024.
Source: PFL

==== Results by round ====
Round	1	2	3	4	5	6	7	8	9	10	11	12	13	14
Ground	H	A	H	A	A	H	H	H	H	A	H	H	H	H
Result	W	W	W	L	W	W	W	W	W	W	W	W	L	W
Position	3	4	3	5	4	3	3	2	2	2	2	2	2	2

Updated to match(es) played on July 4, 2024. Source: PFL
A = Away; H = Home; W = Win; D = Draw; L = Loss

==== Matches ====
April 6, 2024 1	Dynamic Herb Cebu	4–0	Loyola	Talisay
17:00 UTC+8	Sy 35', 49' (pen.); Zamoranho 44', 60'		Closa (yellow card) 52'; Cauyong (yellow card) 56'	Stadium: Dynamic Herb Sports Complex

April 20, 2024 2	Tuloy	1–7	Dynamic Herb Cebu	Manila
17:30 UTC+8	Villanueva 45+1'		Demiroğlu 10'; Sy 40', 53'; Zamoranho 71'; Dabao (yellow card) 83'; Yanık 83'; Borlongan 90+1'; Hama 90+4'	Stadium: Rizal Memorial Stadium

April 27, 2024 3	Dynamic Herb Cebu	10–0	Maharlika Taguig	Talisay
17:00 UTC+8	Mijland 6', 22', 48'; Tasci (yellow card) 19'; Zamoranho 24'; Borlongan 45+2'; Sy 51'; Yanik 68', 87'; Hama 72'; Amirul (yellow card) 89'; Uzoka 90+2'		Terando (yellow card) 47'; Villanueva (yellow card) 83'	Stadium: Dynamic Herb Sports Complex

May 5, 2024 4	Kaya–Iloilo	1–0	Dynamic Herb Cebu	Pavia
15:45 UTC+8	Lopez Mendy 90+5'			Stadium: Campo Alcantara Stadium

May 12, 2024	Dynamic Herb Cebu	3–1	One Taguig	Talisay
17:00 UTC+8	Uzoka 26', (yellow card) 40'; Demiroğlu (yellow card) 30'; Gadia (yellow card) 45+3'; Hama 77'; Sy 84'		Mahmoud (yellow card) 23'; Dutosme (yellow card) 44'; Tuason 47'; Schröck (yellow card) 86'	Stadium: Dynamic Herb Sports Complex

May 19, 2024 6	Dynamic Herb Cebu	5–0	Philippine Air Force	Talisay
17:00 UTC+8	Uzoka 18'; Goutier (yellow card) 36'; Albor 49' (o.g.); Hama 66'; Kore 90'; Selman] 90+6'		Bebangco (yellow card) 29'; Bulaquiña (yellow card) 73'; Poderoso (yellow card) 75'	Stadium: Dynamic Herb Sports Complex

May 25, 2024 7	Dynamic Herb Cebu	2–1	United City	Talisay
17:00 UTC+8	Gadia 27'; Amirul (yellow card) 43'; Rosquillo (yellow card) 64'; Corsame 74', (yellow card) 75'; Kore (yellow card) 90+1'		Sendra (yellow card) 41'; Digha (yellow card) 45' (yellow-red card) 61'; Hartmann 52'	Stadium: Dynamic Herb Sports Complex

June 1, 2024 8	Dynamic Herb Cebu	16–2	DB Garelli United	Talisay
17:00 UTC+8	Mijland 14', 90+1'; Zamoranho 35', 78', 80'; Rosquillo 39'; Corsame 45+2'; Amirul 45+3'; Miyagi 55'; Sy 62', 82', 88' (pen.); Uzoka 64', 68'; Hama 67', 73'		Johnson 37', 72' (pen.); Alovera (yellow card) 60'; Mahinay (yellow card) 84'	Stadium: Dynamic Herb Sports Complex

June 9, 2024 9	Dynamic Herb Cebu	1–0	Davao Aguilas	Talisay
17:30 UTC+8	Uzoka 57'; Rosquillo (yellow card) 59'; Dabao (yellow card) 90'		D. Sato (yellow card) 25'; Ndour (yellow card) 59'	Stadium: Dynamic Herb Sports Complex

June 16, 2024 10	Manila Digger	0–1	Dynamic Herb Cebu	Talisay
17:00 UTC+8	Barsanilla (yellow card) 6'; Ashley (yellow card) 42'		Zamoranho 60'; Gadia (yellow card) 87'	Stadium: Dynamic Herb Sports Complex

June 23, 2024 11	Dynamic Herb Cebu	7–0	Manila Montet	Talisay
17:00 UTC+8	Dabao (yellow card) 19'; Hama 29', 86', (yellow card) 90+3'; Kore 33'; Goutier 45+1'; Amirul (yellow card) 58'; Rosquillo 67', 69', (yellow card) 67'; Ramos 73'			Stadium: Dynamic Herb Sports Complex

June 29, 2024 12	Dynamic Herb Cebu	4–0	Philippine Army	Talisay
17:00 UTC+8	Zamoranho 22', 45+1', 73' (pen.); Ramos (yellow card) 29'; Mijland 53'; Kore (yellow card) 56'; Hama (yellow card) 79'		Dorimon (yellow card) 9'; Solen (yellow card) 22'; Bernardo (yellow card) 25'; Becite (yellow card) 55'; Celiz (yellow card) 60'	Stadium: Dynamic Herb Sports Complex

July 6, 2024 13	Dynamic Herb Cebu	1–2	Stallion Laguna	Talisay
17:00 UTC+8	Dabao (yellow card) 44'; Corsame (yellow card) 50'; Hama 90'; Zamoranho (yellow card) 90+2'		Trujillo (yellow card) 44'; Magson (yellow card) 50', (goal) 56'; McDaniel 60'; Gomez (yellow card) 81'	Stadium: Dynamic Herb Sports Complex

July 13, 2024 14	Dynamic Herb Cebu	5–1	Mendiola 1991	Talisay
17:00 UTC+8	Hama 12'; Yeboah 15' (o.g.); Mijland 51'; Corsame Jr. 55'; Kore 72'		Hajihmedi 79'	Stadium: Dynamic Herb Sports Complex
