= 2024–25 AFC Champions League Two group stage =

Asia secondary club football tournament

The 2024–25 AFC Champions League Two group stage was played from 17 September to 5 December 2024. The top two teams from each group qualified for the knockout stage.

== Draw ==
The draw for the group stage took place on 16 August at the InterContinental Kuala Lumpur, Malaysia. The 32 teams were drawn into eight groups of four: four groups each in the West Region (Groups A–D) and the East Region (Groups E–H). For each region, teams were seeded into four pots and drawn into the relevant positions within each group, based on their association ranking and their seeding within their association. Teams from the same association could not be drawn into the same group.

The following 32 teams entered the group-stage draw, which included the 27 direct entrants, three losers from the AFC Champions League Elite qualifying play-offs and the two winners of the preliminary stage.

Region	Groups	Pot 1	Pot 2	Pot 3	Pot 4
West Region	A–D	(Iran) Sepahan^{ACLE}	(Iran) Tractor	(Jordan) Al-Hussein	(Jordan) Al-Wehdat
West Region	A–D	(United Arab Emirates) Shabab Al Ahli^{ACLE}	(United Arab Emirates) Sharjah	(Tajikistan) Istiklol	(Tajikistan) Ravshan Kulob
West Region	A–D	(Saudi Arabia) Al Taawoun	(Uzbekistan) Nasaf	(India) Mohun Bagan SG	(Turkmenistan) Altyn Asyr^{PS}
West Region	A–D	(Qatar) Al-Wakrah	(Iraq) Al-Quwa Al-Jawiya	(Bahrain) Al-Khaldiya	(Kuwait) Al-Kuwait^{PS}
East Region	E–H	(Thailand) Bangkok United^{ACLE}	(Thailand) Port	(Hong Kong) Lee Man	(Hong Kong) Eastern
East Region	E–H	(Japan) Sanfrecce Hiroshima	(Australia) Sydney FC	(Philippines) Kaya–Iloilo	(Philippines) DH Cebu
East Region	E–H	(South Korea) Jeonbuk Hyundai Motors	(Malaysia) Selangor	(Singapore) Lion City Sailors	(Singapore) Tampines Rovers
East Region	E–H	(China) Zhejiang	(Vietnam) Nam Định	(Thailand) Muangthong United	(Indonesia) Persib

Legend

- ACLE: AFC Champions League Elite qualifying play-off losers
- PS: Preliminary stage winners

== Format ==
In the group stage, each group was played in a double round-robin format on home and away basis. The winners and runners-up of each group advanced to the round of 16 of the knockout stage.

=== Tiebreakers ===
The teams were ranked according to points (3 points for a win, 1 point for a draw, 0 points for a loss). If tied on points, tiebreakers were applied in the following order (Regulations Article 8.3):

1. Points in head-to-head matches among tied teams;
2. Goal difference in head-to-head matches among tied teams;
3. Goals scored in head-to-head matches among tied teams;
4. If more than two teams were tied, and after applying all head-to-head criteria above, a subset of teams were still tied, all head-to-head criteria above were reapplied exclusively to this subset of teams;
5. Goal difference in all group matches;
6. Goals scored in all group matches;
7. Penalty shoot-out if only two teams playing each other in the last round of the group are tied;
8. Disciplinary points (yellow card = 1 point, red card as a result of two yellow cards = 3 points, direct red card = 3 points, yellow card followed by direct red card = 4 points);
9. Drawing of lots.

== Schedule ==
The schedule of the group stage was as follows.

Round	Dates (West region)	Dates (East region)
Matchday 1	17–18 September 2024	18–19 September 2024
Matchday 2	1–2 October 2024	2–3 October 2024
Matchday 3	22–23 October 2024	23–24 October 2024
Matchday 4	5–6 November 2024	6–7 November 2024
Matchday 5	26–27 November 2024	27–28 November 2024
Matchday 6	3–4 December 2024	4–5 December 2024

== Groups ==
The detailed schedule was announced on 16 August 2024 after the draw ceremony.

=== West Region ===
==== Group A ====
Pos	Team	Pld	W	D	L	GF	GA	GD	Pts	Qualification	TRA	WAK	RAV	MBSG
1	(Iran) Tractor	4	3	1	0	16	4	+12	10	Advance to round of 16	—	3–3	7–0	~~2 Oct~~
2	(Qatar) Al-Wakrah	4	1	1	2	4	8	−4	4	Advance to round of 16	0–3	—	0–2	~~6 Nov~~
3	(Tajikistan) Ravshan Kulob	4	1	0	3	3	11	−8	3		1–3	0–1	—	~~27 Nov~~
4	(India) Mohun Bagan SG	0	0	0	0	0	0	0	0	Withdrew, record expunged (Note: On 7 October 2024, AFC announced that Mohun Bagan SG were considered to have withdrawn from the AFC Champions League Two after they failed to appear for their fixture against Tractor in Tabriz due to safety concerns. Their single match was expunged.)	~~4 Dec~~	~~23 Oct~~	~~0–0~~	—

Source: AFC
Rules for classification: Tiebreakers
Notes:
18 September 2024
19:30 UTC+5:30

Mohun Bagan SG (India)	Voided (0–0)	(Tajikistan) Ravshan Kulob
	Report

Vivekananda Yuba Bharati Krirangan Stadium, Kolkata
Attendance: 18,908
Referee: Ahmed Issa (United Arab Emirates)
18 September 2024
19:00 UTC+3

Al-Wakrah (Qatar)	0–3 (Awarded) (Note: On 25 September 2024, the match was declared as a forfeit by the same scoreline after Al-Wakrah fielded an ineligible player currently serving a suspension.)	(Iran) Tractor
	Report

Al Janoub Stadium, Al Wakrah
Attendance: 3,476
Referee: Rustam Lutfullin (Uzbekistan)

2 October 2024
19:00 UTC+5

Ravshan Kulob (Tajikistan)	0–1	(Qatar) Al-Wakrah
	Report	Dala 45'

Central Republican Stadium, Dushanbe (Note: Ravshan Kulob played their home matches at Central Republican Stadium, Dushanbe, instead of their regular home stadium Kulob Markazii Stadium, Kulob, which did not meet AFC requirements.)
Attendance: 7,643
Referee: Majed Al-Shamrani (Saudi Arabia)
2 October 2024
19:30 UTC+3:30

Tractor (Iran)	Cancelled (Note: The match was cancelled by Asian Football Confederation (AFC) as Mohan Bagan SG refused to travel to Tabriz, Iran citing security reasons followed by the current advisory by the Embassy of The Republic of India in Tehran, Iran due to the State mourning for Hezbollah leader Hassan Nasrallah. Consequently on 7 October, AFC announced that Mohun Bagan SG were considered to have withdrawn from the AFC Champions League Two.)	(India) Mohun Bagan SG

Sahand Stadium, Tabriz
Referee: Mahmood Al-Majarafi (Oman)

23 October 2024
19:30 UTC+5:30

Mohun Bagan SG (India)	Cancelled	(Qatar) Al-Wakrah

Vivekananda Yuba Bharati Krirangan Stadium, Kolkata
23 October 2024
19:00 UTC+5

Ravshan Kulob (Tajikistan)	1–3	(Iran) Tractor
Mawutor 90+2'	Report	Hosseinzadeh 26', 32'; Štrkalj 80'

Central Republican Stadium, Dushanbe
Attendance: 4,729
Referee: Alex King (Australia)

6 November 2024
19:00 UTC+3

Tractor (Iran)	7–0	(Tajikistan) Ravshan Kulob
Nazarov 4' (o.g.); Çikalleshi 14', 25', 27'; Hosseinzadeh 45+2', 69'; Alves 49'	Report

Thani bin Jassim Stadium, Al Rayyan (Qatar) (Note: Iranian clubs are required to play their home matches at neutral venues due to security concerns relating to the October 2024 Israeli strikes on Iran.)
Attendance: 200
Referee: Ahmad Ibrahim (Jordan)
6 November 2024
19:00 UTC+3

Al-Wakrah (Qatar)	Cancelled	(India) Mohun Bagan SG

Al Janoub Stadium, Al Wakrah

27 November 2024
19:00 UTC+5

Ravshan Kulob (Tajikistan)	Cancelled	(India) Mohun Bagan SG

Central Republican Stadium, Dushanbe
27 November 2024
19:30 UTC+3:30

Tractor (Iran)	3–3	(Qatar) Al-Wakrah
Hosseinzadeh 45'; Hashemnejad 75', 87'	Report	Gomes 4'; Ali Mukhtar 51'; Dala 69'

Rashid Stadium, Dubai (United Arab Emirates)
Attendance: 200
Referee: Ryo Tanimoto (Japan)

4 December 2024
21:30 UTC+5:30

Mohun Bagan SG (India)	Cancelled	(Iran) Tractor

Vivekananda Yuba Bharati Krirangan Stadium, Kolkata
4 December 2024
19:00 UTC+3

Al-Wakrah (Qatar)	0–2	(Tajikistan) Ravshan Kulob
	Report	Khaitov 55'; Safarov 81'

Al Janoub Stadium, Al Wakrah
Attendance: 1,037
Referee: Kim Hee-gon (South Korea)

==== Group B ====
Pos	Team	Pld	W	D	L	GF	GA	GD	Pts	Qualification	TAA	KHA	AFC	ALT
1	(Saudi Arabia) Al-Taawoun	6	5	0	1	13	6	+7	15	Advance to round of 16	—	2–1	1–2	2–1
2	(Bahrain) Al-Khaldiya	6	4	0	2	14	7	+7	12	Advance to round of 16	2–3	—	4–1	4–0
3	(Iraq) Al-Quwa Al-Jawiya	6	3	0	3	8	9	−1	9		0–1	1–2	—	2–1
4	(Turkmenistan) Altyn Asyr	6	0	0	6	2	15	−13	0		0–4	0–1	0–2	—

Source: AFC
Rules for classification: Tiebreakers
18 September 2024
19:00 UTC+3

Al-Khaldiya (Bahrain)	2–3	(Saudi Arabia) Al Taawoun
Al-Aswad 33'; Abduljabbar 79'	Report	Barrow 1', 29'; Flávio 51'

Bahrain National Stadium, Riffa
Attendance: 948
Referee: Nasrullo Kabirov (Tajikistan)
18 September 2024
21:00 UTC+3

Al-Quwa Al-Jawiya (Iraq)	2–1	(Turkmenistan) Altyn Asyr
C. Salazar 50'; Ahmed 88'	Report	Annaýew 70'

Al-Madina International Stadium, Baghdad
Attendance: 10,741
Referee: Ahmed Faisal Al-Ali (Jordan)

2 October 2024
19:00 UTC+5

Altyn Asyr (Turkmenistan)	0–1	(Bahrain) Al-Khaldiya
	Report	Bellatreche 45+4'

Ashgabat Stadium, Ashgabat (Note: Altyn Asyr played their home matches at Ashgabat Stadium, Ashgabat, instead of their regular home stadium Büzmeýin Sport Topulmy, Büzmeýin, which did not meet AFC requirements.)
Attendance: 15,500
Referee: Ahmad Ibrahim (Jordan)
2 October 2024
21:00 UTC+3

Al Taawoun (Saudi Arabia)	1–2	(Iraq) Al-Quwa Al-Jawiya
João Pedro 62'	Report	Isaiah 45+1'; Abdul Ameer 48'

Al-Taawoun Club Stadium, Buraidah
Attendance: 5,200
Referee: Shen Yinhao (China)

23 October 2024
21:00 UTC+3

Al Taawoun (Saudi Arabia)	2–1	(Turkmenistan) Altyn Asyr
Pedro 45+2'; Mandash 47'	Report	Myratberdiyýew 58'

Al-Taawoun Club Stadium, Buraidah
Attendance: 4,172
Referee: Jumpei Iida (Japan)
23 October 2024
21:00 UTC+3

Al-Quwa Al-Jawiya (Iraq)	1–2	(Bahrain) Al-Khaldiya
Abbas 90+6' (pen.)	Report	Al-Humaidan 31', 74'

Al-Madina International Stadium, Baghdad
Attendance: 3,050
Referee: Rustam Lutfullin (Uzbekistan)

6 November 2024
19:00 UTC+5

Altyn Asyr (Turkmenistan)	0–4	(Saudi Arabia) Al Taawoun
	Report	Barrow 36', 67'; Mandash 40'; Bahusayn 88'

Ashgabat Stadium, Ashgabat
Attendance: 11,000
Referee: Pranjal Banerjee (India)
6 November 2024
19:00 UTC+3

Al-Khaldiya (Bahrain)	4–1	(Iraq) Al-Quwa Al-Jawiya
Al-Aswad 4', 56', 90'; Ismail 52'	Report	Abbas 79'

Bahrain National Stadium, Riffa
Attendance: 437
Referee: Ammar Ashkanani (Kuwait)

27 November 2024
19:00 UTC+5

Altyn Asyr (Turkmenistan)	0–2	(Iraq) Al-Quwa Al-Jawiya
	Report	Ataýew 7' (o.g.); Ahmed 31'

Ashgabat Stadium, Ashgabat
Attendance: 11,196
Referee: Ko Hyung-jin (South Korea)
27 November 2024
21:00 UTC+3

Al Taawoun (Saudi Arabia)	2–1	(Bahrain) Al-Khaldiya
Adam 31'; Mandash 55'	Report	Al-Aswad 39'

Al-Taawoun Club Stadium, Buraidah
Attendance: 3,968
Referee: Sadullo Gulmurodi (Tajikistan)

4 December 2024
17:00 UTC+3

Al-Khaldiya (Bahrain)	4–0	(Turkmenistan) Altyn Asyr
Abduljabbar 10'; Bellatreche 47', 54', 89'	Report

Bahrain National Stadium, Riffa
Attendance: 65
Referee: Razlan Joffri Ali (Malaysia)
4 December 2024
17:00 UTC+3

Al-Quwa Al-Jawiya (Iraq)	0–1	(Saudi Arabia) Al Taawoun
	Report	Girotto 48'

Al-Madina International Stadium, Baghdad
Attendance: 750
Referee: Nasrullo Kabirov (Tajikistan)

==== Group C ====
Pos	Team	Pld	W	D	L	GF	GA	GD	Pts	Qualification	SHJ	WHD	SEP	IST
1	(United Arab Emirates) Sharjah	6	4	1	1	13	8	+5	13	Advance to round of 16	—	2–2	3–1	3–1
2	(Jordan) Al-Wehdat	6	3	2	1	8	7	+1	11	Advance to round of 16	1–3	—	2–1	1–0
3	(Iran) Sepahan	6	3	1	2	12	7	+5	10		3–1	1–1	—	4–0
4	(Tajikistan) Istiklol	6	0	0	6	1	12	−11	0		0–1	0–1	0–2	—

Source: AFC
Rules for classification: Tiebreakers
17 September 2024
19:00 UTC+3

Al-Wehdat (Jordan)	2–1	(Iran) Sepahan
Gueye 22'; Sabra 55'	Report	Hanonov 9'

Amman International Stadium, Amman (Note: Al-Wehdat played their home matches at Amman International Stadium, Amman, instead of their regular home stadium King Abdullah II Stadium, Amman.)
Attendance: 5,005
Referee: Hanna Hattab (Syria)
17 September 2024
21:00 UTC+5

Istiklol (Tajikistan)	0–1	(United Arab Emirates) Sharjah
	Report	Firas 72'

Central Republican Stadium, Dushanbe
Attendance: 10,250
Referee: Ammar Ebrahim Mahfoodh (Bahrain)

1 October 2024
19:30 UTC+3:30

Sepahan (Iran)	4–0	(Tajikistan) Istiklol
Kamara 40'; Aghaeipour 43', 46'; Dabo 76'	Report

Fuladshahr Stadium, Fuladshahr
Attendance: 6,733
Referee: Ryo Tanimoto (Japan)
1 October 2024
20:00 UTC+4

Sharjah (United Arab Emirates)	2–2	(Jordan) Al-Wehdat
Alcácer 9'; Nejašmić 66'	Report	Gueye 28', 62'

Khalid bin Mohammed Stadium, Sharjah
Attendance: 1,874
Referee: Ammar Ashkanani (Kuwait)

22 October 2024
18:00 UTC+4

Sharjah (United Arab Emirates)	3–1	(Iran) Sepahan
Camara 26'; Luanzinho 70'; Caio 90'	Report	Limouchi 51'

Khalid bin Mohammed Stadium, Sharjah
Attendance: 1,002
Referee: Kim Dae-yong (South Korea)
22 October 2024
19:00 UTC+5

Istiklol (Tajikistan)	0–1	(Jordan) Al-Wehdat
	Report	Faisal 51'

Central Republican Stadium, Dushanbe
Attendance: 6,745
Referee: Mohanad Qasim Sarray (Iraq)

5 November 2024
19:00 UTC+3

Al-Wehdat (Jordan)	1–0	(Tajikistan) Istiklol
Gueye 77'	Report

Amman International Stadium, Amman
Attendance: 1,124
Referee: Majed Al-Shamrani (Saudi Arabia)
5 November 2024
21:00 UTC+3

Sepahan (Iran)	3–1	(United Arab Emirates) Sharjah
Hazbavi 12'; Yousefi 45+3'; Aghaeipour 90+1'	Report	Luanzinho 61'

Hamad bin Khalifa Stadium, Doha (Qatar)
Attendance: 373
Referee: Shen Yinhao (China)

26 November 2024
18:00 UTC+4

Sharjah (United Arab Emirates)	3–1	(Tajikistan) Istiklol
Luanzinho 21'; Camara 30'; Caio 58' (pen.)	Report	Al-Hosani 24' (o.g.)

Sharjah Stadium, Sharjah
Attendance: 689
Referee: Kim Woo-sung (South Korea)
26 November 2024
19:30 UTC+3:30

Sepahan (Iran)	1–1	(Jordan) Al-Wehdat
N'Zonzi 64'	Report	Shelbaieh 44' (pen.)

Grand Hamad Stadium, Doha (Qatar)
Attendance: 1,598
Referee: Rustam Lutfullin (Uzbekistan)

3 December 2024
17:00 UTC+3

Al-Wehdat (Jordan)	1–3	(United Arab Emirates) Sharjah
Afaneh 38'	Report	Caio 31'; Luanzinho 47', 67'

Amman International Stadium, Amman
Attendance: 1,365
Referee: Alex King (Australia)
3 December 2024
19:00 UTC+5

Istiklol (Tajikistan)	0–2	(Iran) Sepahan
	Report	Karimi 55' (pen.); Kamara 80'

Central Republican Stadium, Dushanbe
Attendance: 6,750
Referee: Qasim Al-Hatmi (Oman)

==== Group D ====
Pos	Team	Pld	W	D	L	GF	GA	GD	Pts	Qualification	SAH	HUS	KSC	NAS
1	(United Arab Emirates) Shabab Al-Ahli	6	4	1	1	17	11	+6	13	Advance to round of 16	—	3–1	4–1	3–2
2	(Jordan) Al-Hussein	6	3	1	2	11	11	0	10	Advance to round of 16	2–3	—	2–1	2–1
3	Al-Kuwait	6	1	3	2	9	12	−3	6		3–3	2–2	—	0–0
4	(Uzbekistan) Nasaf Qarshi	6	1	1	4	7	10	−3	4		2–1	1–2	1–2	—

Source: AFC
Rules for classification: Tiebreakers
18 September 2024
20:00 UTC+4

Shabab Al Ahli (United Arab Emirates)	3–1	(Jordan) Al-Hussein
Ezatolahi 20'; Azmoun 45'; Mateusão 87'	Report	Nasib 90+5'

Rashid Stadium, Dubai
Attendance: 2,240
Referee: Shen Yinhao (China)
18 September 2024
19:00 UTC+3

Al-Kuwait	0–0	(Uzbekistan) Nasaf
	Report

Jaber Al-Ahmad International Stadium, Kuwait City (Note: Al-Kuwait played their home matches at Jaber Al-Ahmad International Stadium, Kuwait City, instead of their regular home stadium Al Kuwait Sports Club Stadium, Kuwait City.)
Attendance: 950
Referee: Majed Al-Shamrani (Saudi Arabia)

2 October 2024
19:00 UTC+5

Nasaf (Uzbekistan)	2–1	(United Arab Emirates) Shabab Al Ahli
Marušić 83', 90+2'	Report	Mateusão 19'

Markaziy Stadium, Qarshi
Attendance: 9,537
Referee: Payam Heidari (Iran)
2 October 2024
19:00 UTC+3

Al-Hussein (Jordan)	2–1	Al-Kuwait
Ndiaye 32'; Al-Haj 74'	Report	Marhoon 6'

Amman International Stadium, Amman (Note: Al-Hussein played their home matches at Amman International Stadium, Amman, instead of their regular home stadium Al-Hassan Stadium, Irbid, which did not meet AFC requirements.)
Attendance: 2,255
Referee: Ammar Ebrahim Mahfoodh (Bahrain)

23 October 2024
20:00 UTC+4

Shabab Al Ahli (United Arab Emirates)	4–1	Al-Kuwait
Dabbur 9'; Mateusão 45+3' (pen.); Abdalla 61'; Khamis 65'	Report	Nasser 85'

Rashid Stadium, Dubai
Attendance: 1,193
Referee: Shukri Al-Hanfosh (Saudi Arabia)
23 October 2024
19:00 UTC+3

Al-Hussein (Jordan)	2–1	(Uzbekistan) Nasaf
Al-Haj 87', 90+1'	Report	da Silva 90+5'

Amman International Stadium, Amman
Attendance: 1,683
Referee: Pranjal Banerjee (India)

6 November 2024
19:00 UTC+5

Nasaf (Uzbekistan)	1–2	(Jordan) Al-Hussein
Mukhiddinov 23'	Report	Bani Hani 31', 45+3'

Markaziy Stadium, Qarshi
Attendance: 6,785
Referee: Hanna Hattab (Syria)
6 November 2024
19:00 UTC+3

Al-Kuwait	3–3	(United Arab Emirates) Shabab Al Ahli
Zola 38'; Marhoon 42'; Fattah 71'	Report	Cartabia 34'; Bala 68'; Milivojević 90+1'

Al Kuwait Sports Club Stadium, Kuwait City
Attendance: 437
Referee: Abdulla Al-Marri (Qatar)

27 November 2024
19:00 UTC+5

Nasaf (Uzbekistan)	1–2	Al-Kuwait
Marušić 43'	Report	Jabrane 47' (pen.); Amoory 55'

Markaziy Stadium, Qarshi
Attendance: 5,433
Referee: Majed Al-Shamrani (Saudi Arabia)
27 November 2024
19:00 UTC+3

Al-Hussein (Jordan)	2–3	(United Arab Emirates) Shabab Al Ahli
Abu Jalboush 5'; Al-Mardi 15'	Report	Azmoun 42'; Renan 87'; Dabbur 90+1'

Amman International Stadium, Amman
Attendance: 2,214
Referee: Nasrullo Kabirov (Tajikistan)

4 December 2024
20:00 UTC+4

Shabab Al Ahli (United Arab Emirates)	3–2	(Uzbekistan) Nasaf
Mateusão 23'; Azmoun 32', 34'	Report	Mozgovoy 30'; Marušić 45'

Rashid Stadium, Dubai
Attendance: 936
Referee: Mooud Bonyadifard (Iran)
4 December 2024
19:00 UTC+3

Al-Kuwait	2–2	(Jordan) Al-Hussein
Khenissi 56'; Al-Kharqawi 89'	Report	Haddad 23'; Dara 66' (o.g.)

Al Kuwait Sports Club Stadium, Kuwait City
Attendance: 300
Referee: Shen Yinhao (China)

=== East Region ===
==== Group E ====
Pos	Team	Pld	W	D	L	GF	GA	GD	Pts	Qualification	SFR	SYD	KAY	EAS
1	(Japan) Sanfrecce Hiroshima	6	5	1	0	14	5	+9	16	Advance to round of 16	—	2–1	3–0	4–1
2	(Australia) Sydney FC	6	4	0	2	17	6	+11	12	Advance to round of 16	0–1	—	3–1	5–0
3	(Philippines) Kaya–Iloilo	6	1	1	4	6	14	−8	4		1–1	1–4	—	1–2
4	(Hong Kong) Eastern	6	1	0	5	7	19	−12	3		2–3	1–4	1–2	—

Source: AFC
Rules for classification: Tiebreakers
19 September 2024
19:00 UTC+9

Sanfrecce Hiroshima (Japan)	3–0	(Philippines) Kaya–Iloilo
Douglas Vieira 37'; Paciência 54'; O. Iyoha 64'	Report

Edion Peace Wing Hiroshima, Hiroshima
Attendance: 6,806
Referee: Razlan Joffri Ali (Malaysia)
19 September 2024
20:00 UTC+10

Sydney FC (Australia)	5–0	(Hong Kong) Eastern
Ouahim 32', 54'; Grant 43'; Daniel Vera 63' (o.g.); Leung Chun Pong 71' (o.g.)	Report

Jubilee Oval, Sydney (Note: Sydney FC played their home matches at Jubilee Oval, Sydney, instead of their regular home stadium Sydney Football Stadium, Sydney.)
Attendance: 4,021
Referee: Thoriq Alkatiri (Indonesia)

3 October 2024
18:00 UTC+8

Kaya–Iloilo (Philippines)	1–4	(Australia) Sydney FC
Horikoshi 3'	Report	Lolley 26'; Klimala 58', 63'; Amanatidis 90+5'

Rizal Memorial Stadium, Manila (Note: Kaya–Iloilo and DH Cebu played their home matches at Rizal Memorial Stadium, Manila, instead of their regular home stadium Campo Alcantara Stadium, Iloilo City and Dynamic Herb Sports Complex, Talisay respectively, which did not meet AFC requirements.)
Attendance: 372
Referee: Hassan Akrami (Iran)
3 October 2024
20:00 UTC+8

Eastern (Hong Kong)	2–3	(Japan) Sanfrecce Hiroshima
Daniel Vera 6'; Noah Baffoe 46'	Report	Matsumoto 40'; Nakajima 41'; Araki 90+5'

Mong Kok Stadium, Hong Kong
Attendance: 4,365
Referee: Wiwat Jumpaoon (Thailand)

23 October 2024
19:00 UTC+9

Sanfrecce Hiroshima (Japan)	2–1	(Australia) Sydney FC
Higashi 19'; Sotiriou 55'	Report	Segecic 90'

Edion Peace Wing Hiroshima, Hiroshima
Attendance: 12,209
Referee: Yahya Al-Mulla (United Arab Emirates)

25 October 2024 (Note: The match was delayed a day due to adverse weather conditions and safety reasons, associated with the impacts from Tropical Storm Trami.)
12:00 UTC+8

Kaya–Iloilo (Philippines)	1–2	(Hong Kong) Eastern
Yamazaki 45+3' (pen.)	Report	Marcos Gondra 28'; Noah Baffoe 78'

Rizal Memorial Stadium, Manila
Attendance: 138
Referee: Zaid Thamer Mohammed (Iraq)

7 November 2024
19:00 UTC+11

Sydney FC (Australia)	0–1	(Japan) Sanfrecce Hiroshima
	Report	Kato 60'

Jubilee Oval, Sydney
Attendance: 3,512
Referee: Ammar Ebrahim Mahfoodh (Bahrain)
7 November 2024
20:00 UTC+8

Eastern (Hong Kong)	1–2	(Philippines) Kaya–Iloilo
Marcos Gondra 70'	Report	Horikoshi 31' (pen.); Robert Mendy 86' (pen.)

Mong Kok Stadium, Hong Kong
Attendance: 1,953
Referee: Yousif Saeed Hasan (Iraq)

28 November 2024
18:00 UTC+8

Eastern (Hong Kong)	1–4	(Australia) Sydney FC
Noah Baffoe 49'	Report	Ouahim 5', 45+1', 62' (pen.); Klimala 17'

Mong Kok Stadium, Hong Kong
Attendance: 1,712
Referee: Abdulla Ali Al Athba Al Marri (Bahrain)
28 November 2024
18:00 UTC+8

Kaya–Iloilo (Philippines)	1–1	(Japan) Sanfrecce Hiroshima
Komaki 18'	Report	Inoue 68'

Rizal Memorial Stadium, Manila
Attendance: 341
Referee: Omar Al-Yaqoubi (Oman)

5 December 2024
17:00 UTC+9

Sanfrecce Hiroshima (Japan)	4–1	(Hong Kong) Eastern
Aoyama 36'; Paciência 53'; Nakajima 57'; Sotiriou 73'	Report	Ng Yu Hei 10'

Edion Peace Wing Hiroshima, Hiroshima
Attendance: 9,694
Referee: Thoriq Alkatiri (Indonesia)
5 December 2024
19:00 UTC+11

Sydney FC (Australia)	3–1	(Philippines) Kaya–Iloilo
Segecic 38'; Patrick Wood 45+2'; Kucharski 75'	Report	Robert Mendy 85'

Jubilee Oval, Sydney
Attendance: 2,158
Referee: Tejas Nagvenkar (India)

==== Group F ====
Pos	Team	Pld	W	D	L	GF	GA	GD	Pts	Qualification	LCS	POR	ZHP	PSB
1	(Singapore) Lion City Sailors	6	3	1	2	15	11	+4	10	Advance to round of 16	—	5–2	2–0	2–3
2	(Thailand) Port	6	3	1	2	9	11	−2	10	Advance to round of 16	1–3	—	1–0	2–2
3	(China) Zhejiang	6	3	0	3	10	10	0	9		4–2	1–2	—	1–0
4	(Indonesia) Persib	6	1	2	3	9	11	−2	5		1–1	0–1	3–4	—

Source: AFC
Rules for classification: Tiebreakers
19 September 2024
19:00 UTC+7

Persib Bandung (Indonesia)	0–1	(Thailand) Port
	Report	Willen 89'

Si Jalak Harupat Stadium, Bandung (Note: Persib Bandung played their home matches at Si Jalak Harupat Stadium, Bandung, instead of their regular home stadium Gelora Bandung Lautan Api Stadium, Bandung.)
Attendance: 4,204
Referee: Ammar Ashkanani (Kuwait)
19 September 2024
20:00 UTC+8

Lion City Sailors (Singapore)	2–0	(China) Zhejiang
Harun 44'; Maxime Lestienne 79'	Report

Jalan Besar Stadium, Singapore
Attendance: 2,468
Referee: Payam Heydari (Iran)

3 October 2024
20:00 UTC+8

Zhejiang (China)	1–0	(Indonesia) Persib Bandung
Jean Kouassi 70'	Report

Huanglong Sports Center, Hangzhou
Attendance: 23,931
Referee: Sultan Al-Hammadi (Saudi Arabia)

24 October 2024
19:00 UTC+7

Port (Thailand)	1–0	(China) Zhejiang
Felipe Amorim 69'	Report

Pathum Thani Stadium, Pathum Thani (Note: Port played their home matches at Pathum Thani Stadium, Pathum Thani, instead of their regular home stadium PAT Stadium, Bangkok, which did not meet AFC requirements.)
Attendance: 1,971
Referee: Ahmad Yacoub Ibrahim (Jordan)
24 October 2024
19:00 UTC+7

Persib Bandung (Indonesia)	1–1	(Singapore) Lion City Sailors
Tyronne del Pino 43'	Report	Wright 49'

Si Jalak Harupat Stadium, Bandung
Attendance: 2,111
Referee: Bijan Heydari (Iran)

30 October 2024 (Note: The match was delayed from 3 October due to adverse weather conditions and safety reasons.)
20:00 UTC+7

Port (Thailand)	1–3	(Singapore) Lion City Sailors
Shimura 55'	Report	Shawal Anuar 14', 17'; Song Ui-young 39'

Pathum Thani Stadium, Pathum Thani
Attendance: 1,478
Referee: Faisal Alblwi (Saudi Arabia)

7 November 2024
20:00 UTC+8

Lion City Sailors (Singapore)	2–3	(Indonesia) Persib Bandung
Shawal Anuar 8'; Maxime Lestienne 23'	Report	David Silva 81'; Kocijan 90+3'; Tyronne del Pino 90+5'

Jalan Besar Stadium, Singapore
Attendance: 3,152
Referee: Gamini Nivon Robesh (Sri Lanka)
7 November 2024
20:00 UTC+8

Zhejiang (China)	1–2	(Thailand) Port
Andrijašević 6'	Report	Doumbouya 54'; Felipe Amorim 90'

Huanglong Sports Center, Hangzhou
Attendance: 16,933
Referee: Akhrol Risqullaev (Uzbekistan)

28 November 2024
20:00 UTC+8

Zhejiang (China)	4–2	(Singapore) Lion City Sailors
Andrijašević 65' (pen.); Sun Zheng'ao 69'; Jean Kouassi 86'; Wang Yudong 90+4'	Report	Datković 45+4'; Song Ui-young 62'

Huanglong Sports Center, Hangzhou
Attendance: 12,836
Referee: Zaid Thamer (Iraq)
28 November 2024
21:00 UTC+7

Port (Thailand)	2–2	(Indonesia) Persib Bandung
Doumbouya 18', 31'	Report	Ciro Alves 17' (pen.); David Silva 90+5'

Pathum Thani Stadium, Pathum Thani
Attendance: 1,451
Referee: Ammar Mahfoodh (Bahrain)

5 December 2024
19:00 UTC+7

Persib Bandung (Indonesia)	3–4	(China) Zhejiang
Beckham Putra 31'; David Silva 70'; Tyronne del Pino 90+5' (pen.)	Report	Andrijašević 15', 39'; Jean Kouassi 22', 58'

Si Jalak Harupat Stadium, Bandung
Attendance: 5,707
Referee: Asker Nadjafaliev (Uzbekistan)
5 December 2024
20:00 UTC+8

Lion City Sailors (Singapore)	5–2	(Thailand) Port
Song Ui-young 1', 36', 67'; Shawal Anuar 71'; Thy 90+9'	Report	Felipe Amorim 50'; Frans Putros 52'

Jalan Besar Stadium, Singapore
Attendance: 2,357
Referee: Casey Reibelt (Australia)

==== Group G ====
Pos	Team	Pld	W	D	L	GF	GA	GD	Pts	Qualification	BKU	NDI	TAM	LMC
1	(Thailand) Bangkok United	6	4	1	1	12	6	+6	13	Advance to round of 16	—	3–2	4–2	4–1
2	(Vietnam) Nam Định	6	3	2	1	13	8	+5	11	Advance to round of 16	0–0	—	3–2	3–0
3	(Singapore) Tampines Rovers	6	2	2	2	11	11	0	8		1–0	3–3	—	3–1
4	(Hong Kong) Lee Man	6	0	1	5	2	13	−11	1		0–1	0–2	0–0	—

Source: AFC
Rules for classification: Tiebreakers
18 September 2024
20:00 UTC+8

Lee Man (Hong Kong)	0–2	(Vietnam) Nam Định
	Report	Rafaelson 27'; Lucas Silva 73'

Mong Kok Stadium, Hong Kong (Note: Lee Man played their home matches at Mong Kok Stadium, Hong Kong, instead of their regular home stadium Tseung Kwan O Sports Ground, Hong Kong.)
Attendance: 2,147
Referee: Ali Reda (Lebanon)
18 September 2024
19:00 UTC+7

Bangkok United (Thailand)	4–2	(Singapore) Tampines Rovers
Muhsen Al-Ghassani 45+3', 63'; Živković 77' (pen.); Bassel Jradi 90+5'	Report	Manuel Bihr 53' (o.g.); S. Kunori 72'

Thammasat Stadium, Rangsit
Attendance: 899
Referee: Pranjal Banerjee (India)

2 October 2024
19:00 UTC+7

Nam Định (Vietnam)	0–0	(Thailand) Bangkok United
	Report

Thiên Trường Stadium, Nam Định
Attendance: 11,818
Referee: Mohammed Al-Shammari (Qatar)
2 October 2024
20:00 UTC+8

Tampines Rovers (Singapore)	3–1	(Hong Kong) Lee Man
Kopitović 45+3' (pen.); Faris Ramli 64'; Gaizka Martínez 74' (o.g.)	Report	Li Ngai Hoi 4'

Jalan Besar Stadium, Singapore (Note: Tampines Rovers played their home matches at Jalan Besar Stadium, Singapore, instead of their regular home stadium Our Tampines Hub, Singapore.)
Attendance: 883
Referee: Kim Woo-sung (South Korea)

24 October 2024
18:00 UTC+8

Lee Man (Hong Kong)	0–1	(Thailand) Bangkok United
	Report	Bassel Jradi 28'

Mong Kok Stadium, Hong Kong
Attendance: 892
Referee: Ismaeel Habib Ali Ismaeel (Bahrain)
24 October 2024
20:00 UTC+8

Tampines Rovers (Singapore)	3–3	(Vietnam) Nam Định
Shah Shahiran 12'; S. Kunori 24'; S. Yamashita 61'	Report	Rafaelson 32'; Joseph Mpande 41'; Nguyễn Tuấn Anh 76'

Jalan Besar Stadium, Singapore
Attendance: 1,017
Referee: Chen Hsin-chuan (Chinese Taipei)

6 November 2024
19:00 UTC+7

Nam Định (Vietnam)	3–2	(Singapore) Tampines Rovers
Caio César 56'; Joseph Mpande 79'; Lucas Alves 90+6'	Report	Amirul Adli 37'; S. Kunori 48'

Thiên Trường Stadium, Nam Định
Attendance: 9,579
Referee: Nasrullo Kabirov (Tajikistan)
6 November 2024
19:00 UTC+7

Bangkok United (Thailand)	4–1	(Hong Kong) Lee Man
Živković 67', 90+3'; Wanchai 73'; Muhsen Al-Ghassani 78'	Report	Everton 40'

Thammasat Stadium, Rangsit
Attendance: 1,241
Referee: Mohammad Ghabayen (Jordan)

27 November 2024
19:00 UTC+7

Nam Định (Vietnam)	3–0	(Hong Kong) Lee Man
Lucas Silva 11'; Tô Văn Vũ 29'; Rafaelson 43' (pen.)	Report

Thiên Trường Stadium, Nam Định
Attendance: 8,318
Referee: Hanna Hattab (Syria)
27 November 2024
20:00 UTC+8

Tampines Rovers (Singapore)	1–0	(Thailand) Bangkok United
S. Kunori 61'	Report

Jalan Besar Stadium, Singapore
Attendance: 1,026
Referee: Ahmed Issa (United Arab Emirates)

4 December 2024
20:00 UTC+8

Lee Man (Hong Kong)	0–0	(Singapore) Tampines Rovers
	Report

Mong Kok Stadium, Hong Kong
Attendance: 669
Referee: Yoshimi Yamashita (Japan)
4 December 2024
19:00 UTC+7

Bangkok United (Thailand)	3–2	(Vietnam) Nam Định
Adžić 35'; Muhsen Al-Ghassani 45+2' (pen.); Bassel Jradi 83'	Report	Rafaelson 29', 89' (pen.)

Thammasat Stadium, Rangsit
Attendance: 1,288
Referee: Khamis Al-Marri (Qatar)

==== Group H ====
Pos	Team	Pld	W	D	L	GF	GA	GD	Pts	Qualification	JBH	MTU	SEL	DHC
1	(South Korea) Jeonbuk Hyundai Motors	6	4	0	2	16	4	+12	12	Advance to round of 16	—	4–1	1–0	4–0
2	(Thailand) Muangthong United	6	3	2	1	16	10	+6	11	Advance to round of 16	1–0	—	1–1	2–2
3	(Malaysia) Selangor	6	3	1	2	9	5	+4	10		2–1	1–2	—	1–0
4	(Philippines) DH Cebu	6	0	1	5	4	26	−22	1		0–6	2–9	0–4	—

Source: AFC
Rules for classification: Tiebreakers
19 September 2024
17:00 UTC+7

Muangthong United (Thailand)	1–1	(Malaysia) Selangor
Thodsanit 54'	Report	Ronnie Fernández 47'

Rajamangala Stadium, Bangkok (Note: Muangthong United played their home matches at Rajamangala Stadium, instead of their regular home stadium Thunderdome Stadium, Nonthaburi.)
Attendance: 1,366
Referee: Bijan Heydari (Iran)
19 September 2024
20:00 UTC+8

DH Cebu (Philippines)	0–6	(South Korea) Jeonbuk Hyundai Motors
	Report	Jin Tae-ho 15'; Kim Chang-hoon 35'; Moon Seon-min 45'; Park Jae-yong 48'; Yu Je-ho 74'; Park Chae-jun 77'

Rizal Memorial Stadium, Manila
Attendance: 417
Referee: Hussein Abo Yehia (Lebanon)

3 October 2024
17:00 UTC+9

Jeonbuk Hyundai Motors (South Korea)	4–1	(Thailand) Muangthong United
Moon Seon-min 50', 58'; Lee Yeong-jae 54'; Jin Tae-ho 83'	Report	Panthong 66'

Jeonju World Cup Stadium, Jeonju
Attendance: 6,499
Referee: Hanna Hattab (Syria)
3 October 2024
20:00 UTC+8

Selangor (Malaysia)	1–0	(Philippines) DH Cebu
Yohandry Cujía 10'	Report

MBPJ Stadium, Petaling Jaya
Attendance: 8,158
Referee: Nasrullo Kabirov (Tajikistan)

23 October 2024
20:00 UTC+8

Selangor (Malaysia)	2–1	(South Korea) Jeonbuk Hyundai Motors
Harith Haiqal 30'; Ali Olwan 32'	Report	Kwon Chang-hoon 39'

MBPJ Stadium, Petaling Jaya
Attendance: 7,257
Referee: Mooud Bonyadifard (Iran)
23 October 2024
19:00 UTC+7

Muangthong United (Thailand)	2–2	(Philippines) DH Cebu
Felicio Brown 53'; Roback 79'	Report	Rhino Goutier 16'; Hama 90+3'

Rajamangala Stadium, Bangkok
Attendance: 1,465
Referee: Ngô Duy Lân (Vietnam)

7 November 2024
20:00 UTC+8

DH Cebu (Philippines)	2–9	(Thailand) Muangthong United
Guytho Mijland 20', 23'	Report	Felicio Brown 7', 45+2'; Arjvirai 13', 45+5', 51'; Khamyok 36', 39'; Thodsanit 65'; Kraikruan 81'

Rizal Memorial Stadium, Manila
Attendance: 168
Referee: Jonathon Barreiro (Australia)
7 November 2024
19:00 UTC+9

Jeonbuk Hyundai Motors (South Korea)	1–0	(Malaysia) Selangor
Tiago Orobó 22'	Report

Jeonju World Cup Stadium, Jeonju
Attendance: 3,231
Referee: Liu Kwok Man (Hong Kong)

28 November 2024
19:00 UTC+9

Jeonbuk Hyundai Motors (South Korea)	4–0	(Philippines) DH Cebu
Lee Seung-woo 6' (pen.); Jeon Byung-kwan 29'; Jeon Jin-woo 52'; Song Min-kyu 73'	Report

Jeonju World Cup Stadium, Jeonju
Attendance: 2,031
Referee: Nivon Robesh Gamini (Sri Lanka)
28 November 2024
20:00 UTC+8

Selangor (Malaysia)	1–2	(Thailand) Muangthong United
Cheng 5'	Report	Forbes 53'; Poramet 76'

MBPJ Stadium, Petaling Jaya
Attendance: 7,241
Referee: Ahmad Ibrahim Yacoub (Jordan)

5 December 2024
20:00 UTC+8

DH Cebu (Philippines)	0–4	(Malaysia) Selangor
	Report	Yohandry Cujía 44', 48'; Laine 57'; Alvin Fortes 79'

Rizal Memorial Stadium, Manila
Attendance: 326
Referee: Sultan Mohamed Yousif (United Arab Emirates)
5 December 2024
17:00 UTC+7

Muangthong United (Thailand)	1–0	(South Korea) Jeonbuk Hyundai Motors
Thodsanit 45+1'	Report

Rajamangala Stadium, Bangkok
Attendance: 3,125
Referee: Jansen Foo Chuan Hui (Singapore)
