= John Lucero =

Filipino footballer (born 2003)

Personal information
- Full name: John Albert Luis Solis Lucero
- Date of birth: 1 December 2003 (age 22)
- Place of birth: Brighton, England
- Positions: Midfielder; defender

Team information
- Current team: One Taguig

Youth career
- –2022: Brighton & Hove Albion

Senior career*
Years	Team	Apps	(Gls)
2022–2024	Worthing		
2022	→ Lancing (loan)		
2022–2023	→ Newhaven (loan)	17	(0)
2023	→ Azkals Development Club (loan)	1	(0)
2024	Newhaven	9	(0)
2024	Cebu	6	(0)
2025	Rayong	13	(0)
2025–2026	Kanchanaburi Power	15	(0)
2026–	One Taguig	0	(0)

International career^{‡}
2023	Philippines U22	2	(0)
2023–	Philippines U23	9	(0)
2023–	Philippines	5	(1)
- * Club domestic league appearances and goals as of 08:23, 29 May 2026 (UTC) ‡ National team caps and goals as of 16:00, 22 September 2026 (UTC)

John Albert Luis Solis Lucero (born 1 December 2003) is a professional footballer who plays as a midfielder for Philippines Football League side One Taguig. Born in England, he plays for the Philippines national team.

== Club career ==
Lucero was a part of the Brighton & Hove Albion before being released in the summer of 2022. After his release, he joined Worthing and spent time on loan with Lancing. He also spent time on loan with Newhaven, making 19 appearances in all competitions. In 2023, he spent time on loan with Philippines Football League side Azkals Development Team. In January 2024, Lucero was back with Southern Combination Premier Division side Newhaven. On 1 July 2025, Lucero joined newly promoted Thai League 1 side Kanchanaburi Power.

== International career ==
Lucero made his senior international debut for the Philippines in March 2023, in a friendly against Kuwait. In August 2023, he was part of the Philippines U23 squad that competed in the 2023 AFF U-23 Championship.

== Career statistics ==
=== Club ===
As of match played 2 May 2026

Appearances and goals by club, season and competition
Club	Season	League			National cup		League Cup		Continental		Other		Total	
Club	Season	Division	Apps	Goals	Apps	Goals	Apps	Goals	Apps	Goals	Apps	Goals	Apps	Goals
Worthing	2022–23	National League South	0	0	0	0	0	0	—		—		0	0
Newhaven (loan)	2022–23	Southern Combination Football League	17	0	0	0	0	0	—		2 (Note: Appearances in Sussex Senior Cup)	0	19	0
Azkals Development Club	2023–24	Philippines Football League	1	0	—		—		—		—		1	0
Newhaven	2023–24	Southern Combination Football League	9	0	—		—		—		—		9	0
Cebu	2024	Philippines Football League	6	0	—		—		5 (Note: Appearances in AFC Champions League Two)	0	—		11	0
Rayong	2024–25	Thai League 1	13	0	0	0	0	0	—		—		13	0
Kanchanaburi Power	2025–26	Thai League 1	15	0	1	0	1	0	—		—		17	0
Career total			61	0	1	0	1	0	5	0	2	0	70	0

=== International ===
As of match played 1 August 2026.

Appearances and goals by national team and year
National team	Year	Apps	Goals
Philippines	2023	2	0
Philippines	2024	0	0
Philippines	2025	0	0
Philippines	2026	2	1
Total		4	1

Scores and results list Philippines' goal tally first, score column indicates score after each Lucero goal.

List of international goals scored by John Lucero
No.	Date	Venue	Opponent	Score	Result	Competition
1	1 August 2026	New Laos National Stadium, Vientiane, Laos	Laos	1–1	4–1	2026 ASEAN Championship
