= Demiroğlu =

Demiroğlu is a surname. Notable people with the surname include:

- Baran Demiroğlu (born 2005), Turkish footballer
- Göktuğ Demiroğlu (born 1999), Turkish footballer
