= Zamoranho Ho-A-Tham =

Dutch-Surinamese footballer (born 1996)

Personal information
- Full name: Zamoranho Carliho; Leandro Ho-A-Tham
- Date of birth: March 7, 1996 (age 30)
- Place of birth: Amsterdam, Netherlands
- Height: 1.70 m (5 ft 7 in)
- Positions: Attacking midfielder; winger

Team information
- Current team: Victoria Rosport
- Number: 80

Youth career
- –2013: Zeeburgia
- Wooter Academy

Senior career*
Years	Team	Apps	(Gls)
2015–2016	Hercules		
2016–2017	Zeeburgia		
2017–2018	DHSC		
2020–2021	Inter Leipzig	11	(5)
2021–2023	Cosmos Koblenz	36	(19)
2024	FC Karbach	2	(0)
2024	Dynamic Herb Cebu	17	(12)
2025	Naxxar Lions	2	(0)
2025–2026	Victoria Rosport	9	(1)
2026	Lynx	0	(0)
2026–	Stallion Laguna	3	(0)
- * Club domestic league appearances and goals as of 13 March 2026

Zamoranho Carliho Leandro Ho-A-Tham (born 7 March 1996) is a professional footballer, who plays as a winger for Philippines Football League club Stallion Laguna. He is of Dutch-Surinamese nationality.

== Youth career ==
Ho-A-Tham was born in Amsterdam, Netherlands, and has a second, Surinamese passport. In his youth, he played for the various youth teams of Zeeburgia. In between clubs in 2018, he also played for Wooter Academy.

== Club career ==
=== Career in the Netherlands ===
Ho-A-Tham would sign his first pro contract with Utrecht-based club USV Hercules, where he struggled due to numerous injuries that kept him out for majority of the season. He returned to Amsterdam, a year later to play for the senior team of Zeeburgia. His performances there impressed scouts, and after the season he went back to Utrecht to play for DHSC for one season. He departed the club in 2018.

=== Germany ===
In 2020, after football came to a halt during the COVID-19 pandemic, Ho-A-Tham moved to Germany and signed with German lower league side Inter Leipzig. He would leave the club at the end of the season and transfer to FC Cosmos Koblenz, where he had his most successful career stint yet, scoring 19 goals in 36 matches. In the process of doing so, he also became the club's top scorer for that season. In 2024, he moved to Oberliga side FC Karbach, but left after only two matches.

=== Dynamic Herb Cebu ===
After leaving Karbach, he signed for Philippine club Dynamic Herb Cebu as a foreign reinforcement for the 2024 PFL season. He made his debut in an opening matchday 4–0 win over Loyola, scoring a brace. He would go on to have a successful but brief first season at the club, notching 11 goals and 9 assists, including two hat-tricks against Don Bosco Garelli and Philippine Army. Cebu would end up finishing the season in 2nd, qualifying for the 2024–25 AFC Champions League Two.
