= 2024–25 AFC Champions League Two knockout stage =

Asia secondary club football tournament

The knockout stage of the 2024–25 AFC Champions League Two was played from 11 February to 17 May 2025. A total of 16 teams competed in the knockout stage.

== Qualified teams ==
The following teams advanced from the group stage.

Region	Group	Winners	Runners-up
West Region	A	(Iran) Tractor	(Qatar) Al-Wakrah
West Region	B	(Saudi Arabia) Al Taawoun	(Bahrain) Al-Khaldiya
West Region	C	(United Arab Emirates) Sharjah	(Jordan) Al-Wehdat
West Region	D	(United Arab Emirates) Shabab Al Ahli	(Jordan) Al-Hussein
East Region	E	(Japan) Sanfrecce Hiroshima	(Australia) Sydney FC
East Region	F	(Singapore) Lion City Sailors	(Thailand) Port
East Region	G	(Thailand) Bangkok United	(Vietnam) Nam Định
East Region	H	(South Korea) Jeonbuk Hyundai Motors	(Thailand) Muangthong United

== Format ==
In the knockout stage, the 16 teams played a single-elimination tournament. Each tie was played on a home-and-away two-legged basis, except the final which was played as a single match. Extra time and penalty shoot-out would be used to decide the winners if necessary (Regulations Article 10). The order of matches (home vs away) would be determined at the draw, except for the final. The final venue was pre-determined on a rotation basis, with the match hosted by the team from the East Region. The draw for the knockout stage was held on 12 December 2024.

== Schedule ==
The schedule of the competition was as follows.

Stage	Round	Draw date	First leg	Second leg
Knockout stage	Round of 16	12 December 2024	11–13 February 2025	18–20 February 2025
Knockout stage	Quarter-finals	12 December 2024	4–6 March 2025	11–13 March 2025
Knockout stage	Semi-finals	12 December 2024	8–9 April 2025	15–16 April 2025
Knockout stage	Final	12 December 2024	17 May 2025	

== Bracket ==
Round of 16
(Vietnam) Nam Định	0	0	0
(Japan) Sanfrecce Hiroshima	3	4	7
(Thailand) Muangthong United	2	0	2
(Singapore) Lion City Sailors	3	4	7
East Region
(Thailand) Port	0	0	0
(South Korea) Jeonbuk Hyundai Motors	4	1	5
(Australia) Sydney FC (a.e.t.)	2	3	5
(Thailand) Bangkok United	2	2	4
(Bahrain) Al-Khaldiya	1	3	4
(Iran) Tractor	2	3	5
(Qatar) Al-Wakrah	2	2	4 (3)
(Saudi Arabia) Al Taawoun (p)	2	2	4 (4)
West Region
(Jordan) Al-Wehdat	0	3	3
(United Arab Emirates) Shabab Al Ahli	2	4	6
(Jordan) Al-Hussein	0	1	1 (0)
(United Arab Emirates) Sharjah (p)	1	0	1 (3)

Quarter-finals
(Japan) Sanfrecce Hiroshima	0	1	1
(Singapore) Lion City Sailors	3	1	4
(South Korea) Jeonbuk Hyundai Motors	0	2	2
(Australia) Sydney FC	2	3	5
(Iran) Tractor	0	2	2 (2)
(Saudi Arabia) Al Taawoun (p)	0	2	2 (4)
(United Arab Emirates) Shabab Al Ahli	1	1	2 (4)
(United Arab Emirates) Sharjah (p)	1	1	2 (5)

Semi-finals
(Singapore) Lion City Sailors	2	0	2
(Australia) Sydney FC	0	1	1
(Saudi Arabia) Al Taawoun	1	0	1
(United Arab Emirates) Sharjah	0	2	2

Final
18 May – Singapore
(Singapore) Lion City Sailors	1
(United Arab Emirates) Sharjah	2

== Round of 16 ==
=== Summary ===
The first legs were played on 11, 12 and 13 February, and the second legs on 18, 19 and 20 February 2025.

Team 1	Agg.	Team 2	1st leg	2nd leg
West Region
Al-Khaldiya (Bahrain)	4–5	(Iran) Tractor	1–2	3–3
Al-Wakrah (Qatar)	4–4 (3–4 p)	(Saudi Arabia) Al Taawoun	2–2	2–2 (a.e.t.)
Al-Wehdat (Jordan)	3–6	(United Arab Emirates) Shabab Al Ahli	0–2	3–4
Al-Hussein (Jordan)	1–1 (0–3 p)	(United Arab Emirates) Sharjah	0–1	1–0 (a.e.t.)
East Region
Nam Định (Vietnam)	0–7	(Japan) Sanfrecce Hiroshima	0–3	0–4
Muangthong United (Thailand)	2–7	(Singapore) Lion City Sailors	2–3	0–4
Port (Thailand)	0–5	(South Korea) Jeonbuk Hyundai Motors	0–4	0–1
Sydney FC (Australia)	5–4	(Thailand) Bangkok United	2–2	3–2 (a.e.t.)

==== West Region ====
11 February 2025
19:00 UTC+3

Al-Hussein (Jordan)	0–1	(United Arab Emirates) Sharjah
	Report	Caio 42'

Amman International Stadium, Amman (Note: Al-Hussein played their home matches at Amman International Stadium, Amman, instead of their regular home stadium Al-Hassan Stadium, Irbid, which did not meet AFC requirements.)
Attendance: 2,911
Referee: Ryo Tanimoto (Japan)
18 February 2025
18:00 UTC+4

Sharjah (United Arab Emirates)	0–1 (a.e.t.)	(Jordan) Al-Hussein
	Report	Al-Mardi 41'
Penalties
Caio (penalty scored); Ben Larbi (penalty scored); Abdulrahman (penalty scored)	3–0	(penalty missed) Abu Jalboush; (penalty missed) Sharara; (penalty missed) Italo

Sharjah Stadium, Sharjah
Attendance: 1,186
Referee: Khalid Al-Turais (Saudi Arabia)

1–1 on aggregate; Sharjah won 3–0 on penalties.

11 February 2025
17:00 UTC+3

Al-Khaldiya (Bahrain)	1–2	(Iran) Tractor
Al-Romaihi 48'	Report	Hosseinzadeh 50'; Drožđek 55'

Bahrain National Stadium, Riffa
Attendance: 367
Referee: Ahmed Faisal Al-Ali (Jordan)
18 February 2025
19:30 UTC+3:30

Tractor (Iran)	3–3	(Bahrain) Al-Khaldiya
Hosseinzadeh 15'; Štrakalj 32'; Torabi 71'	Report	Abduljabbar 57', 63'; Al-Romaihi 90+3'

Sahand Stadium, Tabriz
Attendance: 50,103
Referee: Adel Al Naqbi (United Arab Emirates)

Tractor won 5–4 on aggregate.

12 February 2025
17:00 UTC+3

Al-Wehdat (Jordan)	0–2	(United Arab Emirates) Shabab Al Ahli
	Report	Azmoun 53', 66' (pen.)

Amman International Stadium, Amman (Note: Al-Wehdat played their home matches at Amman International Stadium, Amman, instead of their regular home stadium King Abdullah II Stadium, Amman.)
Attendance: 467
Referee: Shukri Al-Hanfosh (Saudi Arabia)
19 February 2025
20:00 UTC+4

Shabab Al Ahli (United Arab Emirates)	4–3	(Jordan) Al-Wehdat
Azmoun 14', 84'; Guilherme Bala 80'; Mateusão 81'	Report	Gueye 35'; Semreen 71'; Planić 74' (o.g.)

Rashid Stadium, Dubai
Attendance: 1,175
Referee: Ahmed Al-Kaf (Oman)

Shabab Al Ahli won 6–3 on aggregate.

12 February 2025
19:00 UTC+3

Al-Wakrah (Qatar)	2–2	(Saudi Arabia) Al Taawoun
Assal 55'; Gelson Dala 70'	Report	El Mahdioui 14' (pen.); Roger Martínez 61'

Khalifa International Stadium, Al Rayyan (Note: Al-Wakrah played their home matches at Khalifa International Stadium, Al Rayyan, instead of their regular home stadium Al Janoub Stadium, Al Wakrah.)
Attendance: 1,087
Referee: Fu Ming (China PR)
19 February 2025
21:00 UTC+3

Al Taawoun (Saudi Arabia)	2–2 (a.e.t.)	(Qatar) Al-Wakrah
Al-Kuwaykibi 77'; Rivas 112'	Report	Gelson Dala 53', 120+4'
Penalties
El Mahdioui (penalty scored); Bahebri (penalty scored); Al-Kuwaykibi (penalty scored); Girotto (penalty scored)	4–3	Mendes (penalty scored); Scholz (penalty missed); Omar Salah (penalty scored); Hassan (penalty scored); Gelson Dala (penalty missed)

Al-Taawoun Club Stadium, Buraidah
Attendance: 3,345
Referee: Yusuke Araki (Japan)

4–4 on aggregate; Al Taawoun won 4–3 on penalties.

==== East Region ====
12 February 2025
19:00 UTC+7

Nam Định (Vietnam)	0–3	(Japan) Sanfrecce Hiroshima
	Report	Nakamura 73'; Tanaka 88'; Koshimichi 90+1'

Thiên Trường Stadium, Nam Định
Attendance: 10,800
Referee: Casey Reibelt (Australia)
19 February 2025
19:00 UTC+9

Sanfrecce Hiroshima (Japan)	4–0	(Vietnam) Nam Định
Sasaki 10'; Nakamura 54', 90+1'; Nakano 66'	Report

Edion Peace Wing Hiroshima, Hiroshima
Attendance: 9,471
Referee: Ko Hyung-jin (South Korea)

Sanfrecce Hiroshima won 7–0 on aggregate.

12 February 2025
19:00 UTC+11

Sydney FC (Australia)	2–2	(Thailand) Bangkok United
Segecic 60', 79'	Report	Živković 50' (pen.); Thitiphan 90+6'

Sydney Football Stadium, Sydney
Attendance: 5,131
Referee: Yoshimi Yamashita (Japan)
19 February 2025
19:00 UTC+7

Bangkok United (Thailand)	2–3 (a.e.t.)	(Australia) Sydney FC
Al-Ghassani 18'; Eid 54'	Report	Lolley 2'; Segecic 88'; Costa 100'

Thammasat Stadium, Pathum Thani
Attendance: 1,819
Referee: Ilgiz Tantashev (Uzbekistan)

Sydney FC won 5–4 on aggregate.

13 February 2025
19:00 UTC+7

Port (Thailand)	0–4	(South Korea) Jeonbuk Hyundai Motors
	Report	Park Jin-seob 19'; Compagno 24', 60'; Song Min-kyu 49'

Pathum Thani Stadium, Pathum Thani (Note: Port played their home matches at Pathum Thani Stadium, Pathum Thani, instead of their regular home stadium PAT Stadium, Bangkok, which did not meet AFC requirements.)
Attendance: 1,385
Referee: Abdulla Al Marri (Qatar)
20 February 2025
19:00 UTC+9

Jeonbuk Hyundai Motors (South Korea)	1–0	(Thailand) Port
Park Jae-yong 5'	Report

Jeonju World Cup Stadium, Jeonju
Attendance: 3,487
Referee: Ma Ning (China PR)

Jeonbuk Hyundai Motors won 5–0 on aggregate.

13 February 2025
21:00 UTC+7

Muangthong United (Thailand)	2–3	(Singapore) Lion City Sailors
Lorenzen 56'; Do 90+10'	Report	Anuar 1'; Lestienne 11'; Ramselaar 27'

Thunderdome Stadium, Nonthaburi
Attendance: 3,865
Referee: Kim Jong-hyeok (South Korea)
20 February 2025
20:00 UTC+8

Lion City Sailors (Singapore)	4–0	(Thailand) Muangthong United
Lestienne 3' (pen.); Ramselaar 45+3'; Anuar 63', 88'	Report

Jalan Besar Stadium, Singapore
Attendance: 2,749
Referee: Payam Heydari (Iran)

Lion City Sailors won 7–2 on aggregate.

== Quarter-finals ==
=== Summary ===
Team 1	Agg.	Team 2	1st leg	2nd leg
West Region
Tractor (Iran)	2–2 (2–4 p)	(Saudi Arabia) Al Taawoun	0–0	2–2 (a.e.t.)
Shabab Al Ahli (United Arab Emirates)	2–2 (4–5 p)	(United Arab Emirates) Sharjah	1–1	1–1 (a.e.t.)
East Region
Sanfrecce Hiroshima (Japan)	1–4	(Singapore) Lion City Sailors	0–3 (Note: Lion City Sailors were awarded a 0–3 victory by forfeit, after Sanfrecce Hiroshima fielded an ineligible player. The score on the field was originally a 6–1 win by Sanfrecce Hiroshima.)	1–1
Jeonbuk Hyundai Motors (South Korea)	2–5	(Australia) Sydney FC	0–2	2–3

==== West Region ====
4 March 2025
19:30 UTC+3:30

Tractor (Iran)	0–0	(Saudi Arabia) Al Taawoun
	Report

Sahand Stadium, Tabriz
Attendance: 25,080
Referee: Qasim Al Hatmi (Oman)
11 March 2025
23:00 UTC+3

Al Taawoun (Saudi Arabia)	2–2 (a.e.t.)	(Iran) Tractor
Barrow 54'; Mandash 92'	Report	Alves 50' (pen.); Drožđek 105'
Penalties
El Mahdioui (penalty scored); Barrow (penalty scored); Girotto (penalty scored); Abdulfattah Adam (penalty scored)	4–2	Postonjski (penalty scored); Shiri (penalty missed); Ashouri (penalty missed); Drožđek (penalty scored)

Al-Taawoun Club Stadium, Buraidah
Attendance: 5,689
Referee: Shen Yinhao (China PR)

2–2 on aggregate; Al Taawoun won 4–2 on penalties.

5 March 2025
20:00 UTC+4

Shabab Al Ahli (United Arab Emirates)	1–1	(United Arab Emirates) Sharjah
Azmoun 46'	Report	Lucas 68'

Rashid Stadium, Dubai
Attendance: 5,135
Referee: Ammar Mahfoodh (Bahrain)
12 March 2025
20:00 UTC+4

Sharjah (United Arab Emirates)	1–1 (a.e.t.)	(United Arab Emirates) Shabab Al Ahli
Meloni 35'	Report	Dabbur 90+4'
Penalties
Caio (penalty scored); Ben Larbi (penalty scored); Luanzinho (penalty scored); Abdulbasit (penalty scored); Biro (penalty scored)	5–4	Azmoun (penalty scored); Cartabia (penalty scored); Al-Ghassani (penalty scored); Kauan (penalty missed); Mateusão (penalty scored)

Sharjah Stadium, Sharjah
Attendance: 7,681
Referee: Yusuke Araki (Japan)

2–2 on aggregate; Sharjah won 5–4 on penalties.

==== East Region ====
5 March 2025
19:00 UTC+9

Sanfrecce Hiroshima (Japan)	0–3 Awarded	(Singapore) Lion City Sailors
	Report

Edion Peace Wing Hiroshima, Hiroshima
Attendance: 6,812
Referee: Mooud Bonyadifard (Iran)
12 March 2025
20:00 UTC+8

Lion City Sailors (Singapore)	1–1	(Japan) Sanfrecce Hiroshima
Thy 20'	Report	Nakajima 34'

Jalan Besar Stadium, Singapore
Attendance: 4,193
Referee: Ahmed Issa (United Arab Emirates)

Lion City Sailors won 4–1 on aggregate.

6 March 2025
19:00 UTC+9

Jeonbuk Hyundai Motors (South Korea)	0–2	(Australia) Sydney FC
	Report	Klimala 36', 66'

Yongin Mireu Stadium, Yongin (Note: Jeonbuk Hyundai Motors played their home matches at Yongin Mireu Stadium, Yongin, instead of their regular home stadium Jeonju World Cup Stadium, Jeonju.)
Attendance: 2,561
Referee: Asker Nadjafaliev (Uzbekistan)
13 March 2025
19:00 UTC+11

Sydney FC (Australia)	3–2	(South Korea) Jeonbuk Hyundai Motors
A. Grant 59'; Klimala 71'; Costa 82' (pen.)	Report	Jeon Jin-woo 35', 45+4'

Sydney Football Stadium, Sydney
Attendance: 7,039
Referee: Abdulla Al Marri (Qatar)

Sydney FC won 5–2 on aggregate.

== Semi-finals ==
=== Summary ===
Team 1	Agg.	Team 2	1st leg	2nd leg
West Region
Al Taawoun (Saudi Arabia)	1–2	(United Arab Emirates) Sharjah	1–0	0–2
East Region
Lion City Sailors (Singapore)	2–1	(Australia) Sydney FC	2–0	0–1

==== West Region ====
8 April 2025
21:00 UTC+3

Al Taawoun (Saudi Arabia)	1–0	(United Arab Emirates) Sharjah
Sabiri 2'	Report

Al-Taawoun Club Stadium, Buraidah
Attendance: 5,730
Referee: Fu Ming (China PR)
15 April 2025
20:00 UTC+4

Sharjah (United Arab Emirates)	2–0	(Saudi Arabia) Al Taawoun
Camara 90+4'; Ben Larbi 90+9'	Report

Sharjah Stadium, Sharjah
Attendance: 9,452
Referee: Rustam Lutfullin (Uzbekistan)

Sharjah won 2–1 on aggregate.

==== East Region ====
9 April 2025
20:00 UTC+8

Lion City Sailors (Singapore)	2–0	(Australia) Sydney FC
Ramselaar 18'; Thy 53'	Report

Jalan Besar Stadium, Singapore
Attendance: 4,213
Referee: Zaid Thamer Mohammed (Iraq)
16 April 2025
20:00 UTC+10

Sydney FC (Australia)	1–0	(Singapore) Lion City Sailors
Lolley 85'	Report

Sydney Football Stadium, Sydney
Attendance: 10,588
Referee: Abdullah Jamali (Kuwait)

Lion City Sailors won 2–1 on aggregate.

== Final ==
The final was played on 18 May 2025, with the team from the East region hosting the final.

18 May 2025
20:00 UTC+8

Lion City Sailors (Singapore)	1–2	(United Arab Emirates) Sharjah
Lestienne 90+1'	Report	Ben Larbi 74'; Meloni 90+7'

Bishan Stadium, Singapore
Attendance: 9,737
Referee: Ammar Mahfoodh (Bahrain)
