= Bryan Villanueva =

Filipino footballer (born 2006)

Personal information
- Full name: Bryan Ezekiel Villanueva
- Date of birth: 30 June 2006 (age 20)
- Place of birth: San Jose del Monte, Bulacan, Philippines
- Position: Defender

Team information
- Current team: Dynamic Herb Cebu
- Number: 44

Youth career
- Tuloy Foundation
- FEU–D Baby Tamaraws

Senior career*
| Years | Team | Apps | (Gls) |
| 2024 | Tuloy | 13 | (1) |
| 2024–2025 | PFF Developmental Team | 10 | (0) |
| 2025– | Dynamic Herb Cebu | 0 | (0) |

International career^{‡}
| 2024– | Philippines U20 | 4 | (0) |
| 2025– | Philippines U23 | 3 | (0) |
- * Club domestic league appearances and goals as of 14:11, 17 August 2025 (UTC) ‡ National team caps and goals as of 16:04, 22 September 2026 (UTC)

Bryan Ezekiel Villanueva (born 30 July 2006) is a Filipino professional footballer who plays as a defender for Philippines Football League club Dynamic Herb Cebu and the Philippines under-23 national team.

== Youth career ==
Villanueva was born in the city of San Jose del Monte in Bulacan. He played youth football for the Tuloy Foundation under Father Rocky Evangelista. In high school, he also played football for the juniors team of Far Eastern University, the Baby Tamaraws. In his high school stint he won two titles from 2022 to 2024, and won best defender of the tournament.

During the 2024 high school final, where FEU beat the University of Santo Tomas, Villanueva taunted the UST crowd by cupping his ears, causing a melee between Villanueva and Santo Tomas goalkeeper Ben Sabuga. The incident prompted an investigation from the UAAP afterwards. After graduating from high school, Villanueva would play for FEU's college football team.

== Club career ==
For the shortened 2024 PFL season, Villanueva competed with Tuloy FC, making 13 appearances and scoring one goal as Tuloy finished twelfth out of fifteen teams.

Since Tuloy would not be participating in the succeeding season of the league, Villanueva would play with the PFF-backed Philippine YNT, composed of players from Tuloy and colleges in the UAAP, including his Tuloy teammate Harry Nuñez. He made 10 appearances that season as the team finished ninth out of ten teams.

In 2025, Villanueva would sign for Dynamic Herb Cebu as part of the club's preparations in the ASEAN Club Championship. He made his debut in August 2025 as the club lost the first leg of the qualifiers to Kasuka, though a 3–0 win in the second leg would see them seal qualification.

== International career ==
=== Philippines U19 ===
In 2024, Villanueva was called up to the Philippine under-19 national team to participate in the 2024 ASEAN U-19 Championship. He made his debut on the opening matchday, a 6–0 loss against Indonesia. Later that year, he would get called up to the team again for the 2025 AFC U-20 Asian Cup qualifiers, though the Philippines would fail to qualify.

=== Philippines U23 ===
Villanueva received his next call-up to the under-23 national team in July 2025 for the 2025 ASEAN U-23 Championship. On the opening matchday, the Philippines upset Malaysia 2–0, and finished the tournament with a country-best fourth.
