= Roberto Corsame =

Filipino footballer

Roberto Corsame Jr.
Personal information
- Full name: Roberto Sagun Corsame Jr.
- Date of birth: December 14, 1996 (age 29)
- Place of birth: Tondo, Manila, Philippines
- Height: 1.67 m (5 ft 6 in)
- Positions: Winger; full-back

Team information
- Current team: Maharlika F.C.
- Number: 30

Youth career
- Tondo High School

College career
Years	Team	Apps	(Gls)
2014–2018	Arellano University		

Senior career*
Years	Team	Apps	(Gls)
2014	Dolphins United		
2017	Flame United		
2019–2020	Mendiola 1991	13	(2)
2020–2021	Kaya–Iloilo	2	(0)
2021–	Dynamic Herb Cebu	63	(9)

International career^{‡}
2017	Philippines U23	7	(0)
- * Club domestic league appearances and goals as of 5:16, March 11, 2026 (UTC) ‡ National team caps and goals as of 11:12, September 6, 2023 (UTC)

Roberto Sagun "Papuh" Corsame Jr. (born 14 December 1996) is a Filipino professional footballer who plays either as a winger or a full-back for Dynamic Herb Cebu of the Philippines Football League. He has also played for the youth teams of the Philippines.

== Personal life ==
Corsame was born in Tondo, Manila, where he played "FutKal" due to the lack of space for football pitches. In 2010, he was one of the candidates who was in contention to carry the FIFA flag during the 2010 FIFA World Cup.

== College career ==
Corsame played college football for the Chiefs, the team of Arellano University. The team participated in the NCAA, with Corsame leading them in attack to their first-ever and to date only college title in 2016. He would graduate from the university in 2018, after leading them to another final. He also played for the Arellano juniors team during the 2013 Palarong Pambansa.

== Club career ==
=== Early career ===
In 2014, Corsame first played club football in the United Football League Division 2, playing for Dolphins United. Before joining Mendiola, he would also participate in tournaments for Flame United alongside other PFL players. Corsame was also active in grassroots football in his local community, as one of the main players of Tondo Football Club and helping kids discover the game. He would also play for Tondo in the 7's Football League.

=== Mendiola 1991 ===
After a short break, Corsame joined Mendiola 1991, a new team in the Philippines Football League, which was composed primarily of players from Corsame's college rivals San Beda. He was a vital player for Mendiola, initially playing in the short-lived Philippine Premier League before helping them to a 5th-place finish overall in the PFL, and was also important during the club's run to the semifinals of the 2019 Copa Paulino Alcantara.

=== Kaya–Iloilo ===
In 2020, Corsame left Mendiola to join then 2nd-placers Kaya F.C.–Iloilo as a reinforcement for the club's campaign in the 2020 AFC Cup. However, the tournament was cut short due to the COVID-19 pandemic. He played for the club during the 2020 edition of the Philippines Football League which was held in a bubble.

=== Dynamic Herb Cebu ===
After leaving Kaya, he signed for newly formed Dynamic Herb Cebu which was looking to participate in the Philippines Football League. In the 2022–23 season, he established himself as an important presence at the club and helped them to a 2nd-place finish, qualifying for the AFC Cup for the first time.

== International career ==
=== Philippines U23 ===
Due to his performances for Arellano, he was first called up to the Philippines U-23 in the 2018 AFC U-23 Qualifiers against China, Japan, and Cambodia. He played again for the U23s later that year in the 2017 Southeast Asian Games, making his debut in a 2–0 win over Cambodia after subbing in for Troy Limbo.
