= Kamil Amirul =

Filipino footballer (born 2004)

Personal information
- Full name: Kamil Jaser Rendon Amirul
- Date of birth: February 6, 2004 (age 22)
- Place of birth: Davao City, Philippines
- Height: 1.78 m (5 ft 10 in)
- Positions: Defensive midfielder; defender

Team information
- Current team: Penang
- Number: 4

Youth career
- Altitude Rush Soccer

Senior career*
Years	Team	Apps	(Gls)
2022–2023	Azkals Development Club	12	(0)
2024–2025	Dynamic Herb Cebu	4	(0)
2026–	Penang	6	(0)

International career^{‡}
2019	Philippines U16	3	(0)
2022	Philippines U19	3	(2)
2023–2026	Philippines U23	11	(0)
- * Club domestic league appearances and goals as of 3 May 2026 ‡ National team caps and goals as of 16:02, September 22, 2026 (UTC)

Kamil Jaser Rendon Amirul (born 6 February 2004) is a professional footballer who plays as a defender for Malaysia Super League club Penang and the Philippines under-23 national team.

== Club career ==
=== Azkals Development Club ===
In March 2022, Amirul signed for the Azkals Development Club in preparation for the 2022 Copa Paulino Alcantara. He stayed with the club for the 2022–23 Philippines Football League, though in March 2023 the club suddenly withdrew from the PFL, leaving him clubless.

=== Dynamic Herb Cebu ===
PFL giants Dynamic Herb Cebu signed Amirul for the 2024 Philippines Football League season, with Amirul having previously been playing for their U19 team.

=== Penang ===
On 9 January 2026, Amirul signed for Malaysia Super League club Penang for the 2025–26 Malaysia Super League season on a free transfer from Dynamic Herb Cebu.

== International career ==
=== Philippines U16 ===
In July 2019, Amirul received his first call up to the Philippine U16 team for the 2019 AFF U15 Championship.

=== Philippines U19 ===
Amirul was called up again to the Philippine U19 National Team for the 2022 AFF U19 Championship. He would represent the team again in the AFC U20 Asian Cup qualifiers, where he would score his first two international goals, the first in a narrow 2–3 loss to Thailand, with his second giving the team a 1–0 over Afghanistan.

=== Philippines U23 ===
For the 2023 SEA Games, Amirul received his first call-up to the Philippines national under-23 football team.

=== Philippines ===
In December 2022, Amirul was called up to the Philippines senior team for the first time for the 2022 AFF Championship, though he was not capped.

== Honours ==
Penang

- MFL Challenge Cup runner-up: 2026
