= Göktuğ Demiroğlu =

Turkish footballer (born 1999)

Personal information
- Full name: Göktuğ Demiroğlu
- Date of birth: 21 May 1999 (age 27)
- Place of birth: Zonguldak, Turkey
- Height: 1.90 m (6 ft 3 in)
- Position: Centre-back

Team information
- Current team: Cebu
- Number: 37

Youth career
- 2011–2015: Taskopru Sports
- 2015–2016: Kadiköyspor
- 2016–2017: Manisaspor
- 2017–2018: Fatih Karagümrük
- 2018: Kastanomu ÖIKH
- 2018: Serhat Ardahanspor
- 2018–2019: Alanyaspor

Senior career*
Years	Team	Apps	(Gls)
2019	Maras GSK	6	(0)
2019	Mamak FK		
2021	Yozgatspor	3	(0)
2022	Ladik Belediyespor	6	(0)
2022–2023	Yüksekova Belediyespor	13	(0)
2022–2023	Zalla	22	(1)
2023	Cebu	12	(1)
2024	Karaköprü Belediyespor	7	(0)
2025	Cebu	9	(0)
2025	Deltras	10	(0)
2026–	Cebu	3	(2)
- * Club domestic league appearances and goals as of 21 February 2026

Göktuğ Demiroğlu (born 21 May 1999) is a Turkish professional footballer who plays as a centre-back for Philippines Football League club Cebu.

== Club career ==
=== Youth ===
Demiroğlu first played youth football for the local football program, eventually going to Kadikoyspor's U17 team and Manisaspor's U19 team, before eventually signing with the U19 team of Süper Lig side Alanyaspor.

=== Early club career ===
After leaving the youth team of Alanyaspor, Demiroğlu signed his first contract with Cypriot club Maras GSK. He transferred back to Turkey a few months later. After over a year of not playing, he signed with Yozgatspor, before playing with Ladik Belediyespor and Yuksekova Belediyespor.

=== Zalla UC ===
While playing in Turkey, Demiroğlu got an offer from GCE Villaralbo in Spain but could not complete it for personal reasons. In early 2023, Demiroğlu finally transferred from Yuksekova to Tercera División side Zalla UC in Spain. He played 22 games, scoring 1 goal.

=== Dynamic Herb Cebu ===
In August 2023, it was announced that Dynamic Herb Cebu of the Philippines Football League had signed Demiroğlu as a foreign player for the club's participation in the Copa Paulino Alcantara, Philippines Football League, and their maiden season in the AFC Cup. Cebu confirmed the transfer on August 16.

== Personal life ==
Demiroğlu was born in the city of Çaycuma, Turkey. His idol is Carles Puyol.
