= Joshua Schirmer =

American soccer coach

Personal information
- Full name: Joshua David Schirmer
- Date of birth: August 14, 1981 (age 45)
- Place of birth: Honolulu, Hawaii, United States
- Position: Midfielder

College career
Years	Team	Apps	(Gls)
–2004	Tennessee Wesleyan University		

Senior career*
Years	Team	Apps	(Gls)
- Tokyo Hibernian
2007–2008	HKFC		
2009–2012	Urawa Red Diamonds Amateur		
2020–2023	Prague Raptors		

Managerial career
- 2013–2016: Eastern Florida State College (assistant)
- 2016–2017: University of North Florida (women)
- 2018: Sparta Prague (women)
- 2018–2019: University of Massachusetts Lowell (women)
- 2020–2022: Sparta Prague (match analyst)
- 2022–2023: Orlando City (youth)
- 2023–2024: Dynamic Herb Cebu
- * Club domestic league appearances and goals as of 13:35, 22 September 2023 (UTC)

Joshua David Schirmer (born August 14, 1981) is an American soccer coach and former player who last coached Dynamic Herb Cebu of the Philippines Football League. He has also played in Hong Kong and Japan, coached in the Czech Republic, as well as various college teams in his home country.

== College career ==
Schirmer was born in Honolulu, Hawaii. He played college soccer for the Tennessee Wesleyan Bulldogs and graduated in 2004, being a two-time NAIA Scholar All-American and a three-time member of the Appalachian Athletic Conference All-Academic Team.

== Club career ==
=== Early club career ===
After graduating from college, Schirmer played professional soccer for HKFC for 1 season, before playing for the amateur team of J League team Urawa Reds for 5 years.

=== Prague Raptors ===
After a long break involved with coaching, Schirmer moved to the Czech Republic. While working as a video analyst for Sparta Prague, he played for the Prague Raptors for three seasons before departing in early 2023.

== Coaching career ==
=== College experience ===
Schirmer left Urawa Reds in 2012, and became a coach in 2013, coaching a variety of teams in the American college system. He first worked as an assistant coach at Eastern Florida State College, before getting his coaching job at University of North Florida. In 2018, he again became coach of another women's team, this time the college team of University of Massachusetts Lowell.

=== Sparta Prague and Orlando City ===
In 2018, Schirmer left the U.S. temporarily to become an interim head coach at the women's team of Sparta Prague, where he won the title with them and subsequently guided them to the group stage of the UEFA Women's Champions League the following season.

He returned to the club in 2020, working for three years as a match analyst for the men's team. In 2022, he was supposed to join the technical development teams of Athletic Bilbao but could not make it as the candidate that was recommending him did not get elected as president. he finally departed his job to work as a youth coach with MLS club Orlando City.

=== Dynamic Herb Cebu ===
Departing Orlando City, Schirmer moved to the Philippines to become head coach of PFL club Dynamic Herb Cebu along with Mustafa Al-Saffar. He guided the club to its opening day win in the 2023 Copa Paulino Alcantara, a 2–0 win over UP, and was in charge for the club's first-ever campaign in the AFC Cup.
