= Chima Uzoka =

Filipino footballer (born 1998)

Personal information
- Full name: Chima Venida Uzoka
- Date of birth: 12 June 1998 (age 28)
- Place of birth: Lagos, Nigeria
- Height: 6 ft 3 in (1.91 m)
- Position: Forward

Team information
- Current team: Songkhla
- Number: 10

College career
Years	Team	Apps	(Gls)
2016	National University		

Senior career*
Years	Team	Apps	(Gls)
2016–2017	Green Archers United		
2017–2018	Ilocos United	18	(8)
2018	Global Cebu	4	(0)
2018	Chainat Hornbill	1	(0)
2019	Stallion Laguna	2	(3)
2019	Global Makati	8	(1)
2020	Azkals Development Team	3	(2)
2022–2025	Cebu	20	(13)
2025	Maharlika FC	9	(4)
2026–	Songkhla	1	(0)

International career^{‡}
2015	Philippines U19	2	(0)
2019	Philippines U23	4	(0)
- * Club domestic league appearances and goals as of 03:03; 15 April 2026 (UTC) ‡ National team caps and goals as of 13:55; 4 April 2022 (UTC)

Chima Venida Uzoka (born 12 June 1998) is a Filipino professional footballer who plays as a forward for Thai League 2 club Songkhla.

== Early and personal life ==
Born in Lagos, Nigeria, to a Nigerian father from Lagos State and a Filipina mother, Uzoka attended National University, where he began his football career. His brother Kennedy was an under-23 international for the Philippines.

== Club career ==
=== Green Archers United ===
While playing in the UAAP, Uzoka as well was playing for Green Archers United in the United Football League (UFL).

=== Ilocos United ===
In 2017, Uzoka joined newly founded Philippines Football League club Ilocos United. They played in the inaugural season in 2017 before it was dissolved in January 2018.

=== Global Cebu ===
Uzoka then joined Global Cebu.

=== Chainat Hornbill ===
In 2018, Uzoka signed for Thai side Chainat Hornbill.

=== Stallion Laguna ===
Uzoka returned to the Philippines and joined Stallion Laguna.

=== Return to Global Makati ===
After a short stint with Stallion Laguna, Uzoka returned to his former club Global Makati.

=== Azkals Development Team ===
Before the 2020 Philippines Football League, he signed for Azkals Development Team in the Philippines, playing in three games for ADT in the COVID-19 pandemic-shortened 2020 season and scoring a brace against Mendiola FC 1991 in a 5–0 victory.

=== Dynamic Herb Cebu ===
On March 31, 2022, Dynamic Herb Cebu announced the signing of Uzoka for the 2022 Philippines Football League season.

== International career ==
Uzoka is eligible to represent either Philippines or Nigeria at international level through his parents.

=== Philippines U19 ===
Uzoka was called up to the Philippines under-19 team for the 2015 AFF U-19 Youth Championship in Laos. He made his debut in a 4−1 defeat to Thailand.

=== Philippines U23 ===
Uzoka was part of the Philippines squad for the 2019 Southeast Asian Games on home soil, making his debut in a 1–1 draw with Cambodia.
