= Rhino Goutier =

Dutch footballer

Personal information
- Full name: Rhino Manuel Nicolaas Goutier
- Date of birth: 9 May 2003 (age 23)
- Place of birth: 's-Hertogenbosch, Netherlands
- Height: 1.82 m (6 ft 0 in)
- Position: Defensive midfielder

Team information
- Current team: Dynamic Herb Cebu
- Number: 45

Youth career
- 2014–2017: Brabant United
- 2017–2023: Den Bosch

Senior career*
Years	Team	Apps	(Gls)
2023–2024	Den Bosch	1	(0)
2024	→ Dynamic Herb Cebu (loan)	11	(1)
2024–	Dynamic Herb Cebu	0	(0)
- * Club domestic league appearances and goals as of 13 July 2024

Rhino Manuel Nicolaas Goutier (born 9 May 2003) is a Dutch professional footballer who plays as a defensive midfielder for Philippines Football League club Dynamic Herb Cebu.

== Personal life ==
Goutier was born in the Netherlands to a Dutch father and a Filipina mother. He is eligible to represent the Philippines internationally, due to his mother hailing from the province of Nueva Vizcaya. He first played club football in Brabant, joining the Den Bosch academy at 11 years old.

== Club career ==
=== Den Bosch ===
After joining Den Bosch, Goutier played youth football for the club's U18 and U21 teams. In 2023, he was rewarded with his first professional contract, becoming a first-team player at the Eerste Divisie side. He would go on to make his only appearance for the club so far on April 2, 2023, in a 2–0 loss to Willem II.

=== Dynamic Herb Cebu ===
In February 2024, Goutier was contacted by coach Mustafa Al-Saffar of Philippines Football League club Dynamic Herb Cebu. Den Bosch announced his loan transfer to the Filipino side in early February, with the player transferring with the prospect of more game time. In March, Cebu formally announced his signing.

On 31 July, upon the expiration of his loan deal, he signed a permanent deal with Cebu after 12 years with Den Bosch.
