= Rintaro Hama =

Japanese footballer

Personal information
- Date of birth: 18 May 1999 (age 27)
- Place of birth: Kobe, Hyogo, Japan
- Positions: Forward; winger

Team information
- Current team: Yangon United
- Number: 29

Youth career
- 2016–2018: Nishinomiya High School

College career
Years	Team	Apps	(Gls)
2019–2022	Kōchi University		

Senior career*
Years	Team	Apps	(Gls)
2023–2024	Dynamic Herb Cebu	10	(3)
2025–	Yangon United	1	
- * Club domestic league appearances and goals

Rintaro Hama (濱 琳太郎, Hama Rintarō; born 18 May 1999) is a Japanese professional footballer who plays as a forward or a winger for Myanmar National League club Yangon United.

== Personal life ==
Hama was born in Kobe, Japan. His favorite player is Shinji Okazaki.

== Career ==
=== Youth career ===
In High School, Hama played football for the team of Hyogo Prefectural Nishinomiya High School.

=== College career ===
After graduating from high school, Hama studied in Kōchi University and played for their college team, Kochi University SC, starting in 2019. While playing, he represented his college in the All Japan University Football Championship in 2021 and 2022, as well as the Denso Challenge Cup. After four years playing for Kochi University, he graduated and began to pursue a pro career.

=== Cebu ===
On 7 March 2023, it was announced that Dynamic Herb Cebu of the Philippines Football League had signed Hama as one of their foreign players after the departure of key players like Arda Çınkır during the midway point of the season. Hama made his debut in a 3–2 win over Kaya–Iloilo, and Hama would score in a 2–1 win against the Azkals Development Team, scoring two more in the season to help Cebu to a second-place finish. He would renew his contract with the club as it participated in the AFC Cup for the first time.
