= Dynamic Herb Sports Complex =

Football stadium in the Philippines

- Dynamic Herb–Borromeo Sports Complex
- Interactive map of Dynamic Herb Sports Complex
- Location: Talisay, Cebu
- Coordinates: 10°15′36.1″N 123°51′45.7″E
- Owner: Dynamic Herb Sports Inc.
- Capacity: 550
- Surface: Artificial turf
- Public transit: MB SM Seaside City, Anjo World; KMK Minglanilla, Naga

Construction
- Opened: 2019

Tenant
- Dynamic Herb Cebu (2021–present)

Dynamic Herb–Borromeo Sports Complex, simply known as Dynamic Herb Sports Complex, is a multi-purpose stadium best known for hosting football matches. Located in Talisay, Cebu, the stadium is home to Dynamic Herb Cebu, a club playing in the Philippines Football League.

== History ==
Cebu is considered as one of the sport's hotbeds in the Philippines. The province, however, lacks top-quality sports facilities. The most prominent facilities are Cebu City Sports Center and Cebu Coliseum, both of which are either lacking in adequate facilities or are aging. The grounds and gymnasiums of colleges and universities within Metro Cebu have also been used as sports facilities.

Construction of the first phase of the complex began in October 2017, which focused on laying the astroturf for the football pitch and outdoor facilities. At least ₱100 million was spent for the sports complex's football facility.

The facility sustained heavy damage due to Typhoon Rai (Odette), which hit Cebu in December 2021.

== Facilities ==
The Dynamic Herb Sports Complex consists of a stadium with bleachers that can accommodate 550 people and a FIFA-standard artificial turf, together an indoor arena that would accommodate several sporting events like futsal, basketball, badminton, and volleyball.
