= Guytho Mijland =

Dutch footballer (born 1996)

Personal information
- Full name: Guytho Marcus Renwick Mijland
- Date of birth: July 27, 1996 (age 30)
- Place of birth: Amsterdam, Netherlands
- Height: 1.75 m (5 ft 9 in)
- Position: Winger

Team information
- Current team: Phnom Penh Crown
- Number: 7

Youth career
- Zeeburgia
- 2005–2008: Ajax
- 2009–2011: Vitesse

Senior career*
| Years | Team | Apps | (Gls) |
| 2015–2016 | Zeeburgia | | |
| 2016–2017 | Magreb '90 | 15 | (7) |
| 2017–2018 | Hercules | 12 | (2) |
| 2018–2020 | Lienden | 37 | (7) |
| 2020–2021 | Partizán Bardejov | 15 | (1) |
| 2023 | SV TEC | 12 | (1) |
| 2023–2024 | Eordaikos | | |
| 2024–2025 | Dynamic Herb Cebu | 29 | (13) |
| 2025–2026 | Angkor Tiger | 29 | (15) |
| 2026– | Phnom Penh Crown | 5 | (1) |
- * Club domestic league appearances and goals as of 9 November 2026

Guytho Marcus Renwick Mijland (born 27 July 1996) is a Dutch professional footballer who plays as a winger for Cambodian Premier League club Phnom Penh Crown.

== Youth career ==
Mijland was born in the city of Amsterdam in the Netherlands. In his youth, he played for the various teams of Zeeburgia while also playing for the youth teams of famous Dutch clubs like Ajax and Vitesse Arnheim. In 2015, he began playing for Zeeburgia's senior team.

== Club career ==
=== Early career ===
After playing for the first team of Zeeburgia, Mijland would play for a number of lower-tier clubs in his home country. From 2016 to 2017 he would play amateur football with the club then-named Magreb '90.

In 2017, he signed for Derde Divisie club USV Hercules where he would play for one season, making 12 appearances and scoring 2 goals before departing at the end of the season.

Mjland would have his most successful stint yet after signing with another Dutch side, FC Lienden. He would play for the club for two seasons, scoring 7 goals across 37 matches. In between those two seasons, he went on trial for Bosnian club FK Sloboda Tuzla but would return to Lienden shortly after.

=== Playing abroad ===
In 2020, he signed abroad for the first time, playing for Slovak professional club Partizán Bardejov for one season. In 2023, after a career break, he returned to the Netherlands to play for Derde Divisie club SV TEC, though his stint at the club was only brief.

In the second half of season, his transfer to Greek side Eordaikos of the Gamma Ethniki was announced, where Mijland would play until early 2024.

=== Dynamic Herb Cebu ===
Mijland was then signed by Dynamic Herb Cebu from the Philippines Football League as a foreign reinforcement for the 2024 season. He made his debut in a 4–0 win against Loyola, scoring his first goal — and hat-trick — in a dominant 10–0 win over Maharlika Taguig.
