= 2024–25 AFC Champions League Two =

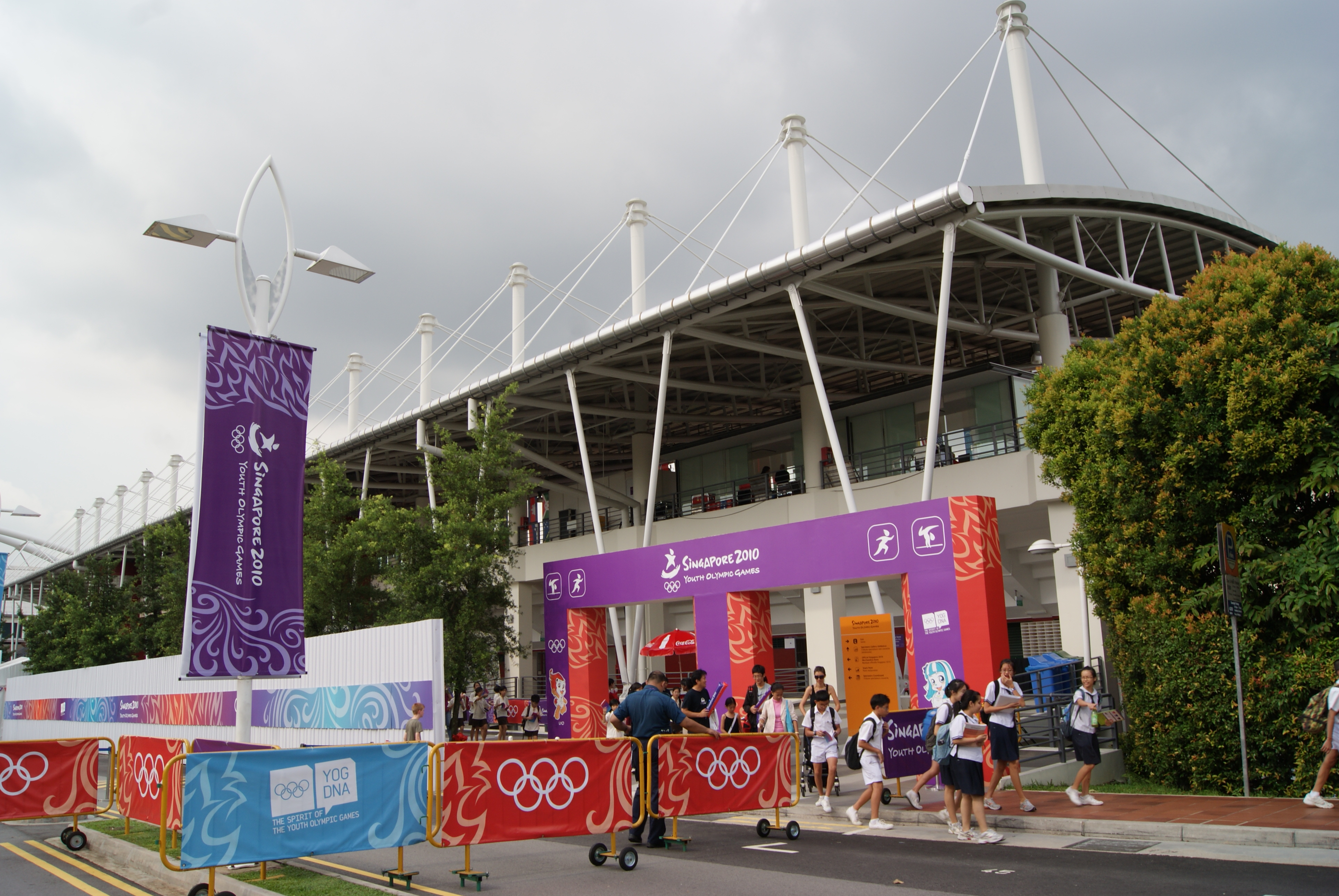
- Bishan Stadium in Singapore hosted the final

Tournament details
- Dates: Qualifying: 14 August 2024; Competition proper: 17 September 2024 – 18 May 2025
- Teams: Competition proper: 31 (from 22 associations)

Final positions
- Champions: (United Arab Emirates) Sharjah (1st title)
- Runners-up: (Singapore) Lion City Sailors

Tournament statistics
- Matches played: 119
- Goals scored: 395 (3.32 per match)
- Attendance: 590,890 (4,965 per match)
- Top scorer: (Iran) Sardar Azmoun (9 goals)
- Best player: (United Arab Emirates) Caio Lucas

The 2024–25 AFC Champions League Two was the 21st edition of the Asia's second-tier club football tournament, organized by the Asian Football Confederation (AFC) and the first since it was rebranded as the AFC Champions League Two. The competition featured a new format, which included a 32-team group stage, as well as increased prize money.

The final was held at Bishan Stadium in Singapore, between Lion City Sailors and Sharjah, with both clubs appearing in their first continental final. Sharjah won 2–1, with Marcus Meloni scoring the winner in the seventh minute of stoppage time. As Sharjah had already qualified for the league stage of the 2025–26 AFC Champions League Elite via their league performance, the preliminary stage slot reserved for the Champions League Two winners in the Champions League Elite was vacated.

Central Coast Mariners were defending champions, but were unable to defend their title as they participated in the league stage of the 2024–25 AFC Champions League Elite.

== Association team allocation ==
The associations were allocated slots according to their club competitions ranking, which was published after the 2022 competitions were completed.

Participation for 2024–25 AFC Champions League Two
Participating
Not participating

West Region (4 groups)
Rank		Member association	Points	Slots	
Rank		Member association	Points	Group stage	Preliminary stage
Region	AFC	Member association	Points	Group stage	Preliminary stage
1	1	Saudi Arabia	93.795	1	0
2	4	Qatar	79.950	1	0
3	5	Iran	72.018	1 (+1 ACLE)	0
4	6	United Arab Emirates	64.129	1 (+1 ACLE)	0
5	9	Uzbekistan	45.006	1	0
6	10	Iraq	36.901	1	0
7	12	Jordan	30.161	2	0
8	16	Tajikistan	23.976	2	0
9	17	India	23.639	1	1
10	18	Bahrain	20.681	1	1
11	19	Kuwait	20.069	0	1
12	20	Turkmenistan	19.464	0	1
Total		Participating associations: 12		14	4
Total		Participating associations: 12		18	

East Region (4 groups)
Rank		Member association	Points	Slots	
Rank		Member association	Points	Group stage	Preliminary stage
Region	AFC	Member association	Points	Group stage	Preliminary stage
1	2	Japan	91.821	1	0
2	3	South Korea	88.295	1	0
3	7	China	57.630	1	0
4	8	Thailand	49.470	~~(1)~~ 2 (+1 ACLE)	0
5	11	Australia	33.830	1	0
6	13	Malaysia	29.951	1	0
7	14	Vietnam	29.469	~~(2)~~ 1	0
8	15	Hong Kong	27.450	2	0
9	21	Philippines	18.428	2	0
10	24	Singapore	16.824	2	0
11	25	North Korea	16.117	0	0
12	26	Indonesia	15.083	1	0
Total		Participating associations: 11		16	0
Total		Participating associations: 11		16	

Notes

1. AFC Licensing (AFC): Association did not have a licensed club.

== Teams ==
The number of appearances and last appearance include the AFC Cup as the predecessor of the AFC Champions League Two.

Entry round	West Region			East Region		
Group stage	Team	Qualifying method	App. (last)	Team	Qualifying method	App. (last)
Group stage	(United Arab Emirates) Shabab Al-Ahli	2024–25 AFC Champions League Elite preliminary stage losers	1st	(Thailand) Bangkok United	2024–25 AFC Champions League Elite preliminary stage losers	1st
Group stage	(Iran) Sepahan	2024–25 AFC Champions League Elite preliminary stage losers	1st	(Japan) Sanfrecce Hiroshima	2023 J1 League third place	1st
Group stage	(Saudi Arabia) Al-Taawoun	2023–24 Saudi Pro League fourth place	1st	(South Korea) Jeonbuk Hyundai Motors	2023 K League 1 fourth place	1st
Group stage	(Qatar) Al-Wakrah	2023–24 Qatar Stars League fourth place	1st	(China) Zhejiang	2023 Chinese Super League third place	1st
Group stage	(Iran) Tractor	2023–24 Persian Gulf Pro League fourth place	1st	(Thailand) Port	2023–24 Thai League 1 third place	2nd (2010)
Group stage	(United Arab Emirates) Sharjah	2023–24 UAE Pro League fourth place	1st	(Thailand) Muangthong United	2023–24 Thai League 1 fifth place	3rd (2011)
Group stage	(Uzbekistan) Nasaf	2023 Uzbekistan Cup winners	4th (2021)	(Australia) Sydney FC	2023 Australia Cup winners	1st
Group stage	(Iraq) Al-Quwa Al-Jawiya	2023–24 Iraq Stars League runners-up	4th (2018)	(Malaysia) Selangor	2023 Malaysia Super League runners-up	6th (2016)
Group stage	(Jordan) Al-Hussein	2023–24 Jordanian Pro League champions	2nd (2005)	(Vietnam) Nam Định	2023–24 V.League 1 champions	1st
Group stage	(Jordan) Al-Wehdat	2023–24 Jordan FA Cup winners	13th (2023–24)	(Hong Kong) Lee Man	2023–24 Hong Kong Premier League champions	3rd (2022)
Group stage	(Tajikistan) Istiklol	2023 Tajikistan Higher League champions	7th (2020)	(Hong Kong) Eastern	2023–24 Hong Kong FA Cup winners	4th (2022)
Group stage	(Tajikistan) Ravshan Kulob	2023 Tajikistan Higher League runners-up	5th (2023–24)	(Philippines) Kaya–Iloilo	2024 Philippines Football League champions and 2023 Copa Paulino Alcantara winners	5th (2022)
Group stage	(India) Mohun Bagan SG	2023–24 Indian Super League league shield winners	8th (2023–24)	(Philippines) DH Cebu	2024 Philippines Football League runners-up	2nd (2023–24)
Group stage	(Bahrain) Al-Khaldiya	2023–24 Bahraini Premier League champions	2nd (2023–24)	(Singapore) Lion City Sailors	2023 Singapore Premier League runners-up	11th (2019)
Group stage				(Singapore) Tampines Rovers	2023 Singapore Premier League third place	15th (2023–24)
Group stage				(Indonesia) Persib	2023–24 Liga 1 champions	2nd (2015)
Preliminary stage	(India) East Bengal	2024 Super Cup winners	9th (2015)			
Preliminary stage	(Bahrain) Al-Ahli	2023–24 Bahraini King's Cup winners	1st			
Preliminary stage	Al-Kuwait	2023–24 Kuwaiti Premier League champions	13th (2023–24)			
Preliminary stage	(Turkmenistan) Altyn Asyr	2023 Ýokary Liga runners-up	10th (2023–24)			

Notes

1. India (IND): On 7 October 2024, AFC announced that Mohun Bagan SG were considered to have withdrawn from the competition after they failed to appear for their fixture against Tractor in Tabriz due to safety concerns arising from the October 2024 Iranian strikes against Israel. Their single match was expunged.
2. Iran (IRN): As 2023–24 Hazfi Cup winners Sepahan qualified for the Champions League Elite via their league position, the spot reserved for the Hazfi Cup winners was transferred to the fourth-placed team in the 2023–24 Persian Gulf Pro League.
3. Iraq (IRQ): As 2023–24 Iraq FA Cup winners Al-Shorta qualified for the Champions League Elite via their league position, the spot reserved for the Iraq FA Cup winners was transferred to the runners-up of the 2023–24 Iraq Stars League.
4. Malaysia (MAS): As 2023 Malaysia FA Cup winners Johor Darul Ta'zim qualified for the Champions League Elite via their league position, the spot reserved for the Malaysia FA Cup winners was transferred to the runners-up of the 2023 Malaysia Super League.
5. Philippines (PHI): As 2023 Copa Paulino Alcantara winners Kaya–Iloilo qualified for the Champions League Two via their league position, the spot reserved for the Copa Paulino Alcantara winners was transferred to the runners-up of the 2024 Philippines Football League.
6. Qatar (QAT): As 2024 Emir of Qatar Cup winners Al-Sadd qualified for the Champions League Elite via their league position, the spot reserved for the Emir of Qatar Cup winners was transferred to the fourth-placed team in the 2023-24 Qatar Stars League.
7. Saudi Arabia (KSA): As 2023–24 King Cup winners Al Hilal qualified for the Champions League Elite via their league position, the spot reserved for the King Cup winners was transferred to the fourth-placed team in the 2023–24 Saudi Pro League.
8. Singapore (SGP): As 2023 Singapore Premier League winners Albirex Niigata (S) are a Japanese team and therefore ineligible to represent Singapore in AFC club competitions, and league runners-up Lion City Sailors qualified for the Champions League Two as 2023 Singapore Cup winners, the spot reserved for the Singapore Premier League winners was transferred to the third-placed team in the league.
9. South Korea (KOR): As 2023 Korean FA Cup winners Pohang Steelers qualified for the Champions League Elite via their league position, the spot reserved for the Korean FA Cup winners was transferred to the fourth-placed team in the 2023 K League 1.
10. Tajikistan (TJK): As 2023 Tajikistan Cup winners Istiklol qualified for the Champions League Two via their league position, the spot reserved for the Tajikistan Cup winners was transferred to the runners-up of the 2023 Tajikistan Higher League.
11. Thailand (THA): As 2023–24 Thai League 1 runners-up Bangkok United qualified for the Champions League Elite as 2023–24 Thai FA Cup winners, the spot reserved for the Thai League 1 runners-up was transferred to the third-placed team in the league.
  Fifth-placed Muangthong United qualified for the Group stage as Thanh Hóa withdrew from the competition and fourth-placed BG Pathum United declined to participate due to logistical issues.
12. Turkmenistan (TKM): Arkadag, winners of the 2023 Ýokary Liga and 2023 Turkmenistan Cup would have qualified for the qualifying play-off, but were only awarded an AFC Challenge League license. As a result, the berth was given to Altyn Asyr, the runners-up of the 2023 Ýokary Liga.
13. United Arab Emirates (UAE): As 2023–24 UAE President's Cup winners Al-Wasl qualified for the Champions League Elite via their league position, and third-placed team of the 2023–24 UAE Pro League team Al Ain qualified for the Champions League Elite as 2023–24 AFC Champions League winners, the spot reserved for the UAE President's Cup winners was transferred to the fourth-placed team in the league.

== Schedule ==
The schedule of the competition is as follows. All matches were played on Tuesdays, Wednesdays and Thursdays, apart from the final which took place on a Sunday.

Stage	Round	Draw date	West region	East region
Preliminary stage		No draw (Note: pre-determined format)	14 August 2024	
Group stage	Matchday 1	16 August 2024	17–18 September 2024	18–19 September 2024
Group stage	Matchday 2	16 August 2024	1–2 October 2024	2–3 October 2024
Group stage	Matchday 3	16 August 2024	22–23 October 2024	23–24 October 2024
Group stage	Matchday 4	16 August 2024	5–6 November 2024	6–7 November 2024
Group stage	Matchday 5	16 August 2024	26–27 November 2024	27–28 November 2024
Group stage	Matchday 6	16 August 2024	3–4 December 2024	4–5 December 2024
Knockout stage	Round of 16	12 December 2024	11–12 and 18–19 February 2025	12–13 and 19–20 February 2025
Knockout stage	Quarter-finals	12 December 2024	4–5 and 11–12 March 2025	5–6 and 12–13 March 2025
Knockout stage	Semi-finals	12 December 2024	8 and 15 April 2025	9 and 16 April 2025
Knockout stage	Final	12 December 2024	18 May 2025 at Bishan Stadium, Bishan	

== Preliminary stage ==
The bracket of the preliminary stage was determined based on each team's association ranking and their seeding within their association, with the team from the higher-ranked association hosting the match. Teams from the same association could not be placed into the same tie. The two winners of the play-off round (two from West Region) advanced to the group stage to join the 30 direct entrants, while losers of the qualifying play-offs entered the group stage of the 2024–25 AFC Challenge League.

Team 1	Score	Team 2
East Bengal (India)	2–3	(Turkmenistan) Altyn Asyr
Al-Ahli (Bahrain)	0–1	Al-Kuwait

14 August 2024
19:00 UTC+5:30

East Bengal (India)	2–3	(Turkmenistan) Altyn Asyr
Lalhlansanga 7'; Crespo 59'	Report	M. Annaýew 18'; S. Nurmuradov 28'; M. Titow 52'

Salt Lake Stadium, Kolkata
Attendance: 27,892
Referee: Alex King (Australia)

14 August 2024
19:15 UTC+3

Al-Ahli (Bahrain)	0–1	Al-Kuwait
	Report	Marhoon 83'

Khalifa Sports City Stadium, Isa Town
Attendance: 1,396
Referee: Qasim Matar Al-Hatmi (Oman)

== Group stage ==
The draw for the group stage took place on 16 August at the InterContinental Kuala Lumpur, Malaysia. The 32 teams were drawn into eight groups of four: four groups each in the West Region (Groups A–D) and the East Region (Groups E–H). For each region, teams were seeded into four pots and drawn into the relevant positions within each group, based on their association ranking and their seeding within their association. Teams from the same association could not be drawn into the same group.

Location of the 2024–25 AFC Champions League Two group stage teams
Brown: Group A; Cyan: Group B; Orange: Group C; Yellow: Group D; Pink: Group E;
Green: Group F; Blue: Group G; Red: Group H

=== West Region ===
==== Group A ====
Pos	Team	Pld	W	D	L	GF	GA	GD	Pts	Qualification	TRA	WAK	RAV	MBSG
1	(Iran) Tractor	4	3	1	0	16	4	+12	10	Advance to round of 16	—	3–3	7–0	~~2 Oct~~
2	(Qatar) Al-Wakrah	4	1	1	2	4	8	−4	4	Advance to round of 16	0–3	—	0–2	~~6 Nov~~
3	(Tajikistan) Ravshan Kulob	4	1	0	3	3	11	−8	3		1–3	0–1	—	~~27 Nov~~
4	(India) Mohun Bagan SG	0	0	0	0	0	0	0	0	Withdrew, record expunged (Note: On 7 October 2024, AFC announced that Mohun Bagan SG were considered to have withdrawn from the AFC Champions League Two after they failed to appear for their fixture against Tractor in Tabriz due to safety concerns. Their single match was expunged.)	~~4 Dec~~	~~23 Oct~~	~~0–0~~	—

Source: AFC
Rules for classification: Tiebreakers

==== Group B ====
Pos	Team	Pld	W	D	L	GF	GA	GD	Pts	Qualification	TAA	KHA	AFC	ALT
1	(Saudi Arabia) Al-Taawoun	6	5	0	1	13	6	+7	15	Advance to round of 16	—	2–1	1–2	2–1
2	(Bahrain) Al-Khaldiya	6	4	0	2	14	7	+7	12	Advance to round of 16	2–3	—	4–1	4–0
3	(Iraq) Al-Quwa Al-Jawiya	6	3	0	3	8	9	−1	9		0–1	1–2	—	2–1
4	(Turkmenistan) Altyn Asyr	6	0	0	6	2	15	−13	0		0–4	0–1	0–2	—

Source: AFC
Rules for classification: Tiebreakers

==== Group C ====
Pos	Team	Pld	W	D	L	GF	GA	GD	Pts	Qualification	SHJ	WHD	SEP	IST
1	(United Arab Emirates) Sharjah	6	4	1	1	13	8	+5	13	Advance to round of 16	—	2–2	3–1	3–1
2	(Jordan) Al-Wehdat	6	3	2	1	8	7	+1	11	Advance to round of 16	1–3	—	2–1	1–0
3	(Iran) Sepahan	6	3	1	2	12	7	+5	10		3–1	1–1	—	4–0
4	(Tajikistan) Istiklol	6	0	0	6	1	12	−11	0		0–1	0–1	0–2	—

Source: AFC
Rules for classification: Tiebreakers

==== Group D ====
Pos	Team	Pld	W	D	L	GF	GA	GD	Pts	Qualification	SAH	HUS	KSC	NAS
1	(United Arab Emirates) Shabab Al-Ahli	6	4	1	1	17	11	+6	13	Advance to round of 16	—	3–1	4–1	3–2
2	(Jordan) Al-Hussein	6	3	1	2	11	11	0	10	Advance to round of 16	2–3	—	2–1	2–1
3	Al-Kuwait	6	1	3	2	9	12	−3	6		3–3	2–2	—	0–0
4	(Uzbekistan) Nasaf Qarshi	6	1	1	4	7	10	−3	4		2–1	1–2	1–2	—

Source: AFC
Rules for classification: Tiebreakers

=== East Region ===
==== Group E ====
Pos	Team	Pld	W	D	L	GF	GA	GD	Pts	Qualification	SFR	SYD	KAY	EAS
1	(Japan) Sanfrecce Hiroshima	6	5	1	0	14	5	+9	16	Advance to round of 16	—	2–1	3–0	4–1
2	(Australia) Sydney FC	6	4	0	2	17	6	+11	12	Advance to round of 16	0–1	—	3–1	5–0
3	(Philippines) Kaya–Iloilo	6	1	1	4	6	14	−8	4		1–1	1–4	—	1–2
4	(Hong Kong) Eastern	6	1	0	5	7	19	−12	3		2–3	1–4	1–2	—

Source: AFC
Rules for classification: Tiebreakers

==== Group F ====
Pos	Team	Pld	W	D	L	GF	GA	GD	Pts	Qualification	LCS	POR	ZHP	PSB
1	(Singapore) Lion City Sailors	6	3	1	2	15	11	+4	10	Advance to round of 16	—	5–2	2–0	2–3
2	(Thailand) Port	6	3	1	2	9	11	−2	10	Advance to round of 16	1–3	—	1–0	2–2
3	(China) Zhejiang	6	3	0	3	10	10	0	9		4–2	1–2	—	1–0
4	(Indonesia) Persib	6	1	2	3	9	11	−2	5		1–1	0–1	3–4	—

Source: AFC
Rules for classification: Tiebreakers

==== Group G ====
Pos	Team	Pld	W	D	L	GF	GA	GD	Pts	Qualification	BKU	NDI	TAM	LMC
1	(Thailand) Bangkok United	6	4	1	1	12	6	+6	13	Advance to round of 16	—	3–2	4–2	4–1
2	(Vietnam) Nam Định	6	3	2	1	13	8	+5	11	Advance to round of 16	0–0	—	3–2	3–0
3	(Singapore) Tampines Rovers	6	2	2	2	11	11	0	8		1–0	3–3	—	3–1
4	(Hong Kong) Lee Man	6	0	1	5	2	13	−11	1		0–1	0–2	0–0	—

Source: AFC
Rules for classification: Tiebreakers

==== Group H ====
Pos	Team	Pld	W	D	L	GF	GA	GD	Pts	Qualification	JBH	MTU	SEL	DHC
1	(South Korea) Jeonbuk Hyundai Motors	6	4	0	2	16	4	+12	12	Advance to round of 16	—	4–1	1–0	4–0
2	(Thailand) Muangthong United	6	3	2	1	16	10	+6	11	Advance to round of 16	1–0	—	1–1	2–2
3	(Malaysia) Selangor	6	3	1	2	9	5	+4	10		2–1	1–2	—	1–0
4	(Philippines) DH Cebu	6	0	1	5	4	26	−22	1		0–6	2–9	0–4	—

Source: AFC
Rules for classification: Tiebreakers

== Knockout stage ==
In the knockout stage, the 16 teams played a single-elimination tournament. Each tie was played on a home-and-away two-legged basis, except the final which was played as a single match. Extra time and penalty shoot-out would be used to decide the winners if necessary (Regulations Article 10). The order of matches (home vs away) would be determined at the draw, except for the final. The final venue was pre-determined on a rotation basis, with the match hosted by the team from the East Region. The draw for the knockout stage was held on 12 December 2024.

=== Bracket ===
Round of 16
(Vietnam) Nam Định	0	0	0
(Japan) Sanfrecce Hiroshima	3	4	7
(Thailand) Muangthong United	2	0	2
(Singapore) Lion City Sailors	3	4	7
East Region
(Thailand) Port	0	0	0
(South Korea) Jeonbuk Hyundai Motors	4	1	5
(Australia) Sydney FC (a.e.t.)	2	3	5
(Thailand) Bangkok United	2	2	4
(Bahrain) Al-Khaldiya	1	3	4
(Iran) Tractor	2	3	5
(Qatar) Al-Wakrah	2	2	4 (3)
(Saudi Arabia) Al Taawoun (p)	2	2	4 (4)
West Region
(Jordan) Al-Wehdat	0	3	3
(United Arab Emirates) Shabab Al Ahli	2	4	6
(Jordan) Al-Hussein	0	1	1 (0)
(United Arab Emirates) Sharjah (p)	1	0	1 (3)

Quarter-finals
(Japan) Sanfrecce Hiroshima	0	1	1
(Singapore) Lion City Sailors	3	1	4
(South Korea) Jeonbuk Hyundai Motors	0	2	2
(Australia) Sydney FC	2	3	5
(Iran) Tractor	0	2	2 (2)
(Saudi Arabia) Al Taawoun (p)	0	2	2 (4)
(United Arab Emirates) Shabab Al Ahli	1	1	2 (4)
(United Arab Emirates) Sharjah (p)	1	1	2 (5)

Semi-finals
(Singapore) Lion City Sailors	2	0	2
(Australia) Sydney FC	0	1	1
(Saudi Arabia) Al Taawoun	1	0	1
(United Arab Emirates) Sharjah	0	2	2

Final
18 May – Singapore
(Singapore) Lion City Sailors	1
(United Arab Emirates) Sharjah	2

=== Round of 16 ===
The first legs were played on 11, 12 and 13 February, and the second legs on 18, 19 and 20 February 2025.

Team 1	Agg.	Team 2	1st leg	2nd leg
West Region
Al-Khaldiya (Bahrain)	4–5	(Iran) Tractor	1–2	3–3
Al-Wakrah (Qatar)	4–4 (3–4 p)	(Saudi Arabia) Al Taawoun	2–2	2–2 (a.e.t.)
Al-Wehdat (Jordan)	3–6	(United Arab Emirates) Shabab Al Ahli	0–2	3–4
Al-Hussein (Jordan)	1–1 (0–3 p)	(United Arab Emirates) Sharjah	0–1	1–0 (a.e.t.)
East Region
Nam Định (Vietnam)	0–7	(Japan) Sanfrecce Hiroshima	0–3	0–4
Muangthong United (Thailand)	2–7	(Singapore) Lion City Sailors	2–3	0–4
Port (Thailand)	0–5	(South Korea) Jeonbuk Hyundai Motors	0–4	0–1
Sydney FC (Australia)	5–4	(Thailand) Bangkok United	2–2	3–2 (a.e.t.)

=== Quarter-finals ===
Team 1	Agg.	Team 2	1st leg	2nd leg
West Region
Tractor (Iran)	2–2 (2–4 p)	(Saudi Arabia) Al Taawoun	0–0	2–2 (a.e.t.)
Shabab Al Ahli (United Arab Emirates)	2–2 (4–5 p)	(United Arab Emirates) Sharjah	1–1	1–1 (a.e.t.)
East Region
Sanfrecce Hiroshima (Japan)	1–4	(Singapore) Lion City Sailors	0–3 (Note: Lion City Sailors were awarded a 0–3 victory by forfeit, after Sanfrecce Hiroshima fielded an ineligible player. The score on the field was originally a 6–1 win by Sanfrecce Hiroshima.)	1–1
Jeonbuk Hyundai Motors (South Korea)	2–5	(Australia) Sydney FC	0–2	2–3

=== Semi-finals ===
Team 1	Agg.	Team 2	1st leg	2nd leg
West Region
Al Taawoun (Saudi Arabia)	1–2	(United Arab Emirates) Sharjah	1–0	0–2
East Region
Lion City Sailors (Singapore)	2–1	(Australia) Sydney FC	2–0	0–1

=== Final ===
The final was played on 18 May 2025, with the team from the East region hosting the final.

18 May 2025
20:00 UTC+8

Lion City Sailors (Singapore)	1–2	(United Arab Emirates) Sharjah
Lestienne 90+1'	Report	Ben Larbi 74'; Meloni 90+7'

Bishan Stadium, Singapore
Attendance: 9,737
Referee: Ammar Mahfoodh (Bahrain)

== Top scorers ==
Team eliminated / inactive for this round / matches voided by AFC
Player is not in the team but the team is still active for this round.

Rank	Player	Team	MD1	MD2	MD3	MD4	MD5	MD6	R16-1	R16-2	QF1	QF2	SF1	SF2	F	Total
1	(Iran) Sardar Azmoun	(United Arab Emirates) Shabab Al-Ahli	1				1	2	2	2	1					9
2	(Singapore) Shawal Anuar	(Singapore) Lion City Sailors		2		1		1	1	2	1					8
3	(Iran) Amirhossein Hosseinzadeh	(Iran) Tractor			2	2	1		1	1						7
4	(Poland) Patryk Klimala	(Australia) Sydney FC		2			1				2	1				6
5	(Bahrain) Kamil Al-Aswad	(Bahrain) Al-Khaldiya			1	3	1									5
5	(Oman) Muhsen Al-Ghassani	(Thailand) Bangkok United	2			1		1		1						5
5	(The Gambia) Musa Barrow	(Saudi Arabia) Al-Taawoun	2			2						1				5
5	(Angola) Gelson Dala	(Qatar) Al-Wakrah		1			1		1	2						5
5	(Senegal) Ousseynou Gueye	(Jordan) Al-Wehdat	1	2		1				1						5
5	(Brazil) Luanzinho	(United Arab Emirates) Sharjah			1	1	1	2								5
5	(Brazil) Caio Lucas	(United Arab Emirates) Sharjah			1		1	1	1		1					5
5	(Brazil) Mateusão	(United Arab Emirates) Shabab Al-Ahli	1	1	1			1		1						5
5	(Morocco) Anas Ouahim	(Australia) Sydney FC	2				3									5
5	(Brazil) Rafaelson	(Vietnam) Nam Định	1		1		1	2								5
5	(Australia) Adrian Segecic	(Australia) Sydney FC			1			1	2	1						5
5	(Singapore) Song Ui-young	(Singapore) Lion City Sailors		1			1	3								5
5	(Belgium) Maxime Lestienne	(Singapore) Lion City Sailors	1			1			1	1					1	5

Note

- Goals scored in the qualifying play-offs and matches voided by AFC are not counted when determining top scorer (Regulations Article 64.4)

== See also ==
- 2024–25 AFC Champions League Elite
- 2024–25 AFC Challenge League
- 2024–25 AFC Women's Champions League
