= Ousseynou Gueye (footballer) =

Senegalese footballer born in 1995

Personal information
- Full name: Ousseynou César Gueye
- Date of birth: 26 February 1995 (age 31)
- Place of birth: Dakar, Senegal
- Height: 1.80 m (5 ft 11 in)
- Position: Right winger

Team information
- Current team: Al-Waab
- Number: 77

Senior career*
Years	Team	Apps	(Gls)
–2019	ASC Jaraaf		
2019–2020	Génération Foot		
2020–2021	Al-Shabab		
2021–2022	Al-Jahra		
2022–2023	Al-Shabab		
2023–2024	Al-Salmiya		
2024–2025	Al-Wehdat	22	(8)
2025–	Al-Waab		
- * Club domestic league appearances and goals as of 15 June 2025

Ousseynou César Gueye (born 26 February 1995) is a Senegalese professional footballer who plays as a winger for Qatari Second Division club Al-Waab.

== Club career ==
=== Early career ===
Born in Dakar, Ousseynou César Gueye began his career at ASC Jaraaf.

On 22 July 2019, it was announced that Gueye would move to Bourges Foot of the Championnat National 2 in France. However, the move did not end up materializing as he played for Senegalese club Génération Foot.

=== Al-Wehdat ===
Gueye joined Al-Wehdat in 2024, where he played a pivotal role to the team that season.

== International career ==
On 13 June 2019, Gueye was called up to the Senegal national football team consisting of local players in preparation for the 2020 African Nations Championship qualification.
