= Cebu F.C. =

Filipino association football club based in Cebu City

Dynamic Herb Cebu
- Full name: Dynamic Herb Cebu Football Club
- Nickname: The Gentle Giants
- Short name: DHC; CEB
- Founded: 2021; 5 years ago
- Ground: Dynamic Herb Sports Complex
- Capacity: 550
- Owner: Dynamic Herb Sports Incorporated
- President: Ugur Tasci
- Head coach: Glenn Ramos
- League: Philippines Football League
- 2025–26: Philippines Football League, 4th of 10
- Website: cebufootballclub.com
Home colours	Away colours

Cebu Football Club, (also known as Dynamic Herb Cebu Football Club or DH Cebu for sponsorship reasons), is a Philippine professional football club based in Cebu City, Cebu. The club currently plays in the Philippines Football League, the top-flight league of football in the Philippines.

The club was founded in 2021. Affiliated with Central Visayas F.A., Cebu is the third professional club to represent its region, after Cebu Queen City United which competed in UFL Division 2, and Global Cebu which competed in the Philippines Football League.

== History ==
The club is owned by Dynamic Herb Sports Incorporated, under the management of Ugur Tasci, a Turkish businessman who first arrived in the Philippines in 1994, together with his brother, Cem Tasci who developed Leylam Football Club that brought honors to Cebu in football tournaments, locally and abroad. Following the success of Leylam, Tasci formed a new club that would join the Philippines Football League. Leylam is considered as the predecessor of Cebu Football Club.

=== Philippines Football League ===
In 2021, it was reported that the club would change its name to Dynamic Herb Cebu and was applying for a license to be able to join the Philippines Football League as early as that season. On 31 July 2021, Dynamic Herb Cebu was granted a provisional license pending full compliance of requirements that would allow it to participate in the 2021 Philippines Football League season.

==== 2021 season ====
Cebu's initial roster composed mostly of homegrown players from Leylam reinforced by players from other PFL clubs and collegiate teams. The club's provisional license was affirmed on 24 August 2021. The club was scheduled to debut in the 2021 PFL season, but the competition was cancelled due to the COVID-19 pandemic. The club played its first competitive match on November 11, 2021, a 1–0 loss to Stallion Laguna at the 2021 Copa Paulino Alcantara. Cebu qualified in the 2021 Copa Paulino Alcantara semi-finals as group runners-up. They lost to eventual champions Kaya-Iloilo 1–0 in the semifinals. Cebu finished their 2021 season as fourth placers in the Copa Paulino Alcantara after losing to Stallion Laguna via penalty shootout.

==== 2022 season ====
After securing a partnership with Turkish Süper Lig club Hatayspor, Cebu signed Mehmet Kakil as the club's new head coach with Levent Öztürk as his assistant. They also signed former Hatayspor youth players Mert Altinöz and Arda Çinkir while Nazim Özcan was signed on loan.

Cebu started their 2022 season by defeating Stallion Laguna 2–0 in the 2022 Copa Paulino Alcantara, recording their first ever victory since the club's foundation. Cebu finished second in the table and captured a semi-finals berth for the second straight season. They lost to eventual champions United City 1–0 in the semifinals. Cebu once again finished as fourth placers in the Copa Paulino Alcantara after losing to Stallion Laguna 2–1.

Cebu made their Philippines Football League debut in a 3–0 defeat against Kaya-Iloilo.

=== AFC Cup debut ===
Cebu finished 2022–23 Philippines Football League season as runners-up thus seeing them qualified for their very first 2023–24 AFC Cup group stage competition. The club was than drawn in Group F alongside Australian club, Macarthur, Cambodian league champions, Phnom Penh Crown and Myanmar league champions, Shan United. On 26 October 2023, Cebu recorded their first ever continental win against Shan United in a 1–0 win with Ken Murayama scoring the only goal to give the club their first ever points in the AFC Cup. Cebu then finished the 2024 Philippines Football League as runners-up which the club qualified for the 2024–25 AFC Champions League Two. Cebu was then place in Group H alongside South Korean giants Jeonbuk Hyundai Motors, Malaysian club Selangor and Thailand club Muangthong United. Cebu lost all of their group stage fixtures except a 2–2 draw against Muangthong United in Bangkok on 23 October 2024.

=== First piece of silverware ===
Cebu than won the 2024–25 Philippines Football League Finals Series where Guytho Mijland scored the only goal to win the club first ever piece of silverware in the club history thus also seeing Cebu participating in the 2025–26 ASEAN Club Championship qualifying play-off round where they won 4–2 on aggregate against Bruneian club Kasuka thus qualifying to the 2025–26 ASEAN Club Championship where Cebu would drawn alongside both Thailand club, Buriram United and BG Pathum United, Malaysian club Selangor, Vietnamese club Công An Hà Nội and Singaporean club Tampines Rovers.

== Stadium ==
Cebu plays its home games at the Dynamic Herb Sports Complex in Talisay. The sports complex has a stadium with 550 seating capacity, two FIFA-standard football fields, and indoor arena that accommodates several sporting events like futsal, basketball, badminton, and volleyball. For the AFC Cup/AFC Champions League Two, Cebu has played its "home" games at the Rizal Memorial Stadium in Manila.

== Team image ==
=== Naming history ===
Cebu used the name DH Cebu instead of Dynamic Herb Cebu in the AFC tournaments due to the competition's club naming regulations regarding commercial sponsorship.

=== Crest and colors ===
Cebu's crest colors are red, white, grey and black and features a whale shark from Oslob, Cebu.

== Kit manufacturers and shirt sponsors ==
Period	Kit manufacturer	Main sponsor
2021–present	(Philippines) RAD Apparel	(Philippines) Dynamic Herb Sports^{1} (Philippines) The Green Table (Philippines) Tigertek Sports (Japan) Pocari Sweat (Turkey) Leylam (AFC competitions only)

- ^{1}Major shirt sponsor (names located at the front of the shirt).
- ^{2}Secondary sponsor (names mostly located at the back of the shirt).

== Affiliated clubs ==
The following club is currently affiliated with Cebu:

- (Turkey) Hatayspor (2022–present)

In January 2022, the club launched a partnership with Turkish Süper Lig club Hatayspor. The partnership with Hatayspor aims to develop both men's and women's team and the development of football academic programs for the youth academy. Also part of the agreemenManagement and stafff coaching staff and players, including those who are in the academy.

== Players ==
As of 13 September 2026

Note: Flags indicate national team as defined under FIFA eligibility rules; some limited exceptions apply. Players may hold more than one non-FIFA nationality.

No.	Pos.	Nation	Player
1	GK	PHI	Joseph Ceniza
3	DF	JPN	Shinichiro Ochiai
4	DF	PHI	Kamil Amirul
7	FW	ERI	Fahmi Ibrahim
8	MF	CIV	Marius Kore
9	FW	PHI	Chima Uzoka
10	FW	SEN	Abou Sy (captain)
11	DF	PHI	John Clyde Vitualla
12	DF	PHI	Erich Orale
13	DF	PHI	Baris Tasci
14	MF	PHI	Joshua Broce
15	MF	PHI	Glen Ramos

No.	Pos.	Nation	Player
18	MF	JPN	Ryoki Imaizumi
19	FW	CIV	Lamine Konate
22	GK	PHI	Jessie Semblante
23	GK	JPN	Timothy Shiraoka
25	MF	GHA	Jacob Aboosah
27	DF	PHI	Aaron Vasquez
77	MF	JPN	Shunsuke Murakami
79	FW	PHI	Ryan Marcelino
88	DF	PHI	Jed Keleghan
93	MF	PHI	Shirmar Felongco
—	MF	PHI	Roberto Aguilar

As of February 2025

Position	Name
President	(Turkey) Ugur Tasci
Sporting director	(Turkey) Evren Tasci
Team manager	(Philippines) Hannah Wong
Head coach	(Philippines) Glenn Ramos
Assistant coach	(Philippines) John Martin Ferrer
Goalkeeping coach	(Philippines) Ralph Datoy
Fitness coach	(Portugal) Paulo Isidoro
Physiotherapist	(Philippines) Mark Kevin Uy

== Honours ==
=== League ===
- Philippines Football League
  - Runners-up: 2022–23, 2024

=== Cup ===
- Philippines Football League Finals Series
  - Winners: 2024–25

== Managerial history ==
Name	Period	Achievements	Ref.
(Philippines) Oliver Colina	2021–2022		
(Turkey) Mehmet Kakil	2022–2023		
(United States) Joshua Schirmer	2023–2024		
(Turkey) Memiş Özata	2024		
(Turkey) Mustafa Göksu	2024–2025		
(Philippines) Glenn Ramos	2025–present	2024–25 Philippines Football League Finals Series	

== Notable players ==
As of 2026–27 season.

=== International capped players ===
AFC/OFC.: (Japan) Arya Igami; (Japan) Timothy Shiraoka	CAF.: (Ghana) Ibrahim Moro; (Tunisia) Rami Jridi	UEFA.: —NIL—	CONMEBOL/ CONCACAF.: (United States) Sam Strong

== Season by season record ==
Season	Division	League position	Copa Paulino Alcantara	AFC Cup/AFC Champions League Two
2021	PFL	Canceled	4th	—
2022–23	PFL	2nd	Semi-finals	—
2024	PFL	2nd	—	Group stage
2024–25	PFL	4th (League)	—	Group stage
2024–25	PFL	1st (Finals Series)	—	Group stage
2025–26	PFL	3rd	—	—
Updated as of August 27, 2025

== Continental record ==
As of 4 February 2026

All results (away, home and aggregate) list Cebu's goal tally first.

Competition	Q	Pld	W	D	L	GF	GA	GD	W %
AFC Cup / AFC Champions League Two	2	12	1	2	9	8	45	−37	8.33
ASEAN Club Championship	1	5	0	1	4	2	13	−11	0.00
Total	3	16	1	3	12	10	58	−48	6.25

Season	Competition	Round	Club	Score		Agg. / Pos.
Season	Competition	Round	Club	Home	Away	Agg. / Pos.
2023–24	AFC Cup	Group stage	(Cambodia) Phnom Penh Crown	0–3	0–4	Group F (3rd)
2023–24	AFC Cup	Group stage	(Australia) Macarthur FC	0–3	2–8	Group F (3rd)
2023–24	AFC Cup	Group stage	(Myanmar) Shan United	1–0	1–1	Group F (3rd)
2024–25	AFC Champions League Two	Group stage	(South Korea) Jeonbuk Hyundai Motors	0–6	0–4	Group H (4th)
2024–25	AFC Champions League Two	Group stage	(Malaysia) Selangor	0–4	0–1	Group H (4th)
2024–25	AFC Champions League Two	Group stage	(Thailand) Muangthong United	2–9	2–2	Group H (4th)
2025–26	ASEAN Club Championship	Qualifying Play-off	(Brunei) Kasuka	3–0	1–2	4–2
2025–26	ASEAN Club Championship	Group stage	(Singapore) Tampines Rovers	1–3	—N/a	Group A (6th)
2025–26	ASEAN Club Championship	Group stage	(Vietnam) Công An Hà Nội	—N/a	0–1	Group A (6th)
2025–26	ASEAN Club Championship	Group stage	(Malaysia) Selangor	1–1	—N/a	Group A (6th)
2025–26	ASEAN Club Championship	Group stage	(Thailand) BG Pathum United	—N/a	0–2	Group A (6th)
2025–26	ASEAN Club Championship	Group stage	(Thailand) Buriram United	—N/a	0–6	Group A (6th)

== Performance in AFC competitions ==
- AFC Cup/AFC Champions League Two: 3 appearances

2023–24: Group Stage
2024–25: Group Stage
2025–26: Group Stage
