= 2025–26 Thai League 1 =

Thai League 1
- Season: 2025–26
- Dates: 15 August 2025 – 10 May 2026
- Champions: Buriram United; 12th Thai League 1 title
- Relegated: Muangthong United; Nakhon Ratchasima; Kanchanaburi Power
- ACL Elite League Stage: Buriram United; Port; Ratchaburi
- ACL Two Group Stage: BG Pathum United
- Matches: 240
- Goals: 642 (2.68 per match)
- Top goalscorer: Guilherme Bissoli (23 goals)
- Biggest home win: 8 goals total Port 8–0 Kanchanaburi Power (4 October 2025)
- Biggest away win: 5 goals total Muangthong United 0–5 Buriram United (22 November 2025)
- Highest scoring: 8 goals total Port 8–0 Kanchanaburi Power (4 October 2025); PT Prachuap 4–4 Ayutthaya United (6 December 2025)
- Longest winning run: 6 matches Buriram United
- Longest unbeaten run: 9 matches Buriram United
- Longest winless run: 14 matches Nakhon Ratchasima
- Longest losing run: 10 matches Nakhon Ratchasima
- Highest attendance: 30,726; Buriram United 1–1 Lamphun Warriors (10 May 2026)
- Lowest attendance: 1,020; Nakhon Ratchasima 3–0 Kanchanaburi Power (25 January 2026)
- Total attendance: 1,248,506
- Average attendance: 5,202
- All statistics correct as of 10 May 2026.

The 2025–26 Thai League 1 was the 9th season of Thai League 1 under its current name and the 29th season of top-flight Thai football professional league since its establishment in 1996. This league is also known as BYD Sealion 6 League I due to the sponsorship deal with BYD Auto. The season began on 15 August 2025 and concluded on 10 May 2026.

Buriram United entered the season as the four-time defending champions, having won their fourth consecutive league title and 11th overall Thai top-flight football title the previous season.

== Overview ==
=== Promotion and relegation (pre-season) ===
16 teams will compete in the league – the thirteen teams from previous season and three teams promoted from Thai League 2.

==== Teams promoted from Thai League 2 ====
Chonburi and Ayutthaya United became the first two teams to be promoted on 26 April 2025 after winning their respective matches. Chonburi were also crowned champions by defeating Suphanburi 0–1 in an away match, while Ayutthaya United beat Bangkok 5–1. Kanchanaburi Power became the last team to be promoted after their win against Phrae United 4–5 on aggregate in promotion play-off match.

Chonburi returned to the top division after a one-season absence, while for Ayutthaya United and Kanchanaburi Power this was their first season in the top division in their history, respectively.

==== Teams relegated to Thai League 2 ====
Khonkaen United became the first team to be relegated on 30 March 2025 after suffering a 0–5 defeat to Bangkok United. The result ended their time in the top division for 4 seasons.

Nakhon Pathom United became the second team to be relegated on 13 April 2025 after earning a 2–2 draw against Port. The result ended their time in the top division for 2 seasons.

Nongbua Pitchaya became the third and final team to be relegated after suffering a 1–2 defeat to Port and Rayong's win over Khonkaen United on 20 April 2025. These results meant that Nongbua Pitchaya only lasted one season in the top division and returned to the second division.

== Teams ==
=== Changes ===
The following teams have changed division since the 2024–25 season.

==== To Thai League 1 ====
Promoted from the Thai League 2

- Chonburi
- Ayutthaya United
- Kanchanaburi Power

==== From Thai League 1 ====
Relegated to the Thai League 2

- Khonkaen United
- Nakhon Pathom United
- Nongbua Pitchaya

=== Teams by province ===
Rank	Province	Number	Teams
1	(Pathum Thani province) Pathum Thani	2	Bangkok United and BG Pathum United
2	(Bangkok) Bangkok^{1}	1	Port
2	Buriram	1	Buriram United
2	(Chiang Rai province) Chiang Rai	1	Chiangrai United
2	(Chonburi province) Chonburi	1	Chonburi
2	(Kanchanaburi province) Kanchanaburi	1	Kanchanaburi Power
2	(Lamphun province) Lamphun	1	Lamphun Warriors
2	Nakhon Ratchasima	1	Nakhon Ratchasima
2	(Nonthaburi province) Nonthaburi	1	Muangthong United
2	(Phra Nakhon Si Ayutthaya province) Phra Nakhon Si Ayutthaya	1	Ayutthaya United
2	(Prachuap Khiri Khan province) Prachuap Khiri Khan	1	PT Prachuap
2	(Ratchaburi province) Ratchaburi	1	Ratchaburi
2	(Rayong province) Rayong	1	Rayong
2	(Sukhothai province) Sukhothai	1	Sukhothai
2	(Uthai Thani province) Uthai Thani	1	Uthai Thani

1. Special administrative area.

=== Stadiums and locations ===
Locations of teams in the 2025–26 Thai League 1
Locations of teams in the 2025–26 Thai League 1 from Bangkok Metropolitan Region

Team	Location	Stadium	Capacity	2024–25 season
Ayutthaya United^{↑}	Ayutthaya	Ayutthaya Province Stadium	5,000	Thai League 2 Runner-up
Bangkok United	Thanyaburi	True BG Stadium	15,114	Thai League 1 Runner-up
BG Pathum United	Thanyaburi	True BG Stadium	15,114	Thai League 1 Third place
Buriram United	Buriram	Chang Arena	32,600	Thai League 1 Champion
Chiangrai United	Ban Du	Singha Chiangrai Stadium	12,000	11th in Thai League 1
Chonburi^{↑}	Chonburi	Chonburi Daikin Stadium	8,680	Thai League 2 Champion
Kanchanaburi Power^{↑}	Kanchanaburi	Kleeb Bua Stadium	13,000	Promotion play-off winner
Lamphun Warriors	Lamphun	Lamphun Warriors Stadium	5,179	9th in Thai League 1
Muangthong United	Pak Kret	Thunderdome Stadium	13,000	6th in Thai League 1
Nakhon Ratchasima	Nakhon Ratchasima	80th Birthday Stadium	25,000	13th in Thai League 1
Port	Khlong Toei	PAT Stadium	6,250	5th in Thai League 1
PT Prachuap	Prachuap Khiri Khan	Sam Ao Stadium	5,000	7th in Thai League 1
Ratchaburi	Ratchaburi	Dragon Solar Park	10,000	4th in Thai League 1
Rayong	Rayong	Rayong Province Stadium	7,500	12th in Thai League 1
Sukhothai	Sukhothai	Thalay Luang Stadium	8,020	10th in Thai League 1
Uthai Thani	Uthai Thani	Uthai Thani Province Stadium	5,500	8th in Thai League 1

^{↑}	Promoted from the Thai League 2

=== Personnel and kits ===
Note: Flags indicate national team as has been defined under FIFA eligibility rules. Players and coaches may hold more than one non-FIFA nationality.

Team	Manager	Captain	Kit manufacturer	Kit sponsor		
Team	Manager	Captain	Kit manufacturer	Domestic	Continental	Other kit sponsor(s)
Ayutthaya United	(Thailand national football team) Arun Tulwattanangkul	(Thailand national football team) Kitphom Bunsan	(Thailand) Ego Sport	Chang		List: Front: Gulf, Muang Thai Insurance, Micron; Back: None; Sleeves: Rojana Industrial; Shorts: None
Bangkok United	(Thailand national football team) Totchtawan Sripan	(Brazil national football team) Everton	(Germany) Adidas	True	CP	List: Front: Stanley, Garmin, CP, CP Axtra, Makro, Lotus's, Euro Cake, 7-Eleven; Back: Gatorade, Daikin; Sleeves: Toyota Sure; Shorts: None
BG Pathum United	(Montenegro national football team) Vladimir Vujović	(Thailand national football team) Sarach Yooyen	(United States) Nike	Leo	Singha Group	List: Front: Gomuc, Asset Wise, Euro Cake, Reparil Ice Spray; Back: Stiebel Eltron, Yanmar; Sleeves: Coca-Cola, Muang Thai Insurance, BG Sports; Shorts: None
Buriram United	(England national football team) Mark Jackson	(Thailand national football team) Narubadin Weerawatnodom	(Thailand) Made by club (Thailand) Ego Sport^{3}	Chang		List: Front: Yamaha, SAMART; Back: Coca-Cola; Sleeves: CP, Muang Thai Life Assurance, True, Dunlopillo; Shorts: Toyo Tires
Chiangrai United	(Thailand national football team) Sirisak Yodyardthai	(Thailand national football team) Sanukran Thinjom	(Thailand) Grand Sport	Singha Lemon Soda		List: Front: BG Sports, BYD Hornbill, Overbook Hospital; Back: Singha Park Chiangrai; Sleeves: Thai AirAsia, Toyota Chiangrai, Haier, Aroy-D; Shorts: None
Chonburi	(Thailand national football team) Rangsan Viwatchaichok	(Thailand) Channarong Promsrikaew	(Thailand) FBT	Chang		List: Front: Leapmotor, Panasonic, Euro Cake; Back: Daikin; Sleeves: AIA, WHA Group, Thai AirAsia; Shorts: None
Kanchanaburi Power	(South Korea national football team) Lee Jung-soo	(England national football team) Andros Townsend	(Thailand) Imane^{4}	Rabbit		List: Front: Elera, UIH; Back: mMILK; Sleeves: KSL; Shorts: None
Lamphun Warriors	(Germany national football team) Dennis Amato	(Thailand national football team) Akarapong Pumwisat	(Thailand) Made by club	Chang		List: Front: Betagro, Jele; Back: Tanaka Precision, We Master Trade; Sleeves: Gassan Khuntan Golf Resort, Muang Thai Insurance; Shorts: None
Muangthong United	(Brazil national football team) Jose Alves Borges	(Thailand national football team) Tristan Do	(Thailand) Ego Sport	Yamaha		List: Front: Mitsubishi Heavy Industries; Back: OR, Coca-Cola; Sleeves: Fujifilm X/GFX, AIA, Leo; Shorts: None
Nakhon Ratchasima	(Thailand national football team) Surapong Kongthep	(Thailand national football team) Nattawut Jaroenboot	(Thailand) Volt	Mazda		List: Front: Leo, Energy Absolute; Back: FastFac, Carrier, Major Group; Sleeves: Muang Thai Insurance, Vana Nava Water Jungle; Shorts: None
Port	(Brazil national football team) Alexandre Gama (Thailand national football team) Sarawut Treephan (Interim)	(Thailand national football team) Peeradol Chamrasamee	(Japan) Mizuno	Muang Thai Insurance		List: Front: Chang, Port Authority of Thailand, Thai AirAsia, Coca-Cola; Back: None; Sleeves: TQM Insurance Broker, Muang Thai Life Assurance; Shorts: None
PT Prachuap	(Thailand national football team) Sasom Pobprasert	(Thailand national football team) Jirapan Phasukihan	(Thailand) Ari	PTG Energy		List: Front: Chang, 2Gear; Back: None; Sleeves: Bendix, SSI; Shorts: None
Ratchaburi	(Thailand national football team) Worrawoot Srimaka	(Thailand national football team) Jakkaphan Kaewprom	(Thailand) Ego Sport	Chang		List: Front: Euro Cake; Back: None; Sleeves: VAC, Master Vet; Shorts: None
Rayong	(Thailand national football team) Jukkapant Punpee	(Brazil national football team) Stenio Junior	(Thailand) Made by club^{5}	WHA Group		List: Front: None; Back: WHA Group, VSK, IRPC, Gulf, Thai AirAsia, Origin; Sleeves: SNC, Muang Thai Insurance, M-Dear, May Flower; Shorts: None
Sukhothai	(Thailand national football team) Ekalak Thong-am	(Thailand national football team) Tassanapong Muaddarak	(Thailand) Warrix	Chang		List: Front: CP; Back: None; Sleeves: Bangkok Airways, Reparil Ice Spray; Shorts: None
Uthai Thani	(Serbia national football team) Miloš Joksić	(Thailand national football team) Wattana Playnum	(Thailand) Warrix	GRC		List: Front: Chang, G9 Gold, Princ Hospital Uthai Thani; Back: Cosmogold; Sleeves: None; Shorts: None

1. Interim.
2. Apparel made by club.
3. Apparel used on other competition.
4. Kanchanaburi Power used Warrix as their apparel in the first half of the season.
5. Rayong used Imane as their apparel in the first half of the season.

=== Managerial changes ===
==== Pre-season ====
Team	Outgoing manager	Manner	Date of vacancy	Replaced by	Date of appointment
Lamphun Warriors	(Brazil) Alexandre Gama	Resigned	27 April 2025	(Brazil) Wanderley Junior	12 June 2025
Singha Chiangrai United	(Thailand) Worawut Wangsawad	End of interim spell	15 April 2025	(Thailand) Sirisak Yodyardthai	22 August 2025
Nakhon Ratchasima	(Thailand) Teerasak Po-on	Signed by (Thailand) Chonburi	29 April 2025	(Thailand) Issara Sritaro	30 May 2025
Uthai Thani	(Serbia) Miloš Joksić	End of contract	2 May 2025	(Switzerland) Gino Lettieri	26 May 2025
Chonburi	(Thailand) Thawatchai Damrong-Ongtrakul	End of contract	4 May 2025	(Thailand) Teerasak Po-on	9 May 2025
Port	(Thailand) Choketawee Promrut	End of interim spell	7 May 2025	(Brazil) Alexandre Gama	1 June 2025
Muangthong United	(Switzerland) Gino Lettieri	Signed by (Thailand) Uthai Thani	25 May 2025	(Thailand) Rangsan Viwatchaichok	28 May 2025

==== During the season ====
Team	Outgoing manager	Manner	Date of vacancy	Position in table	Replaced by	Date of appointment
Kanchanaburi Power	(Thailand) Dusit Chalermsan	Sacked	25 September 2025	14th	(Spain) Joaquín Gómez	4 October 2025
BG Pathum United	(Thailand) Supachai Komsilp	Sacked	2 October 2025	4th	(Montenegro) Vladimir Vujović (interim)	2 October 2025
Buriram United	(Brazil) Osmar Loss	Sacked	7 October 2025	1st	(England) Mark Jackson	15 October 2025
Uthai Thani	(Switzerland) Gino Lettieri	Sacked	8 October 2025	16th	(Serbia) Miloš Joksić	8 October 2025
Lamphun Warriors	(Brazil) Wanderley Junior	Sacked	18 October 2025	14th	(Thailand) Jongsarit Wutchuay	18 October 2025
Chonburi	(Thailand) Teerasak Po-on	Sacked	19 October 2025	15th	(Thailand) Witthaya Laohakul (interim)	20 October 2025
Muangthong United	(Thailand) Rangsan Viwatchaichok	Sacked	25 October 2025	9th	(Thailand) Uthai Boonmoh (interim)	26 October 2025
BG Pathum United	(Montenegro) Vladimir Vujović (interim)	End of interim spell	25 October 2025	5th	(Japan) Masatada Ishii	30 October 2025
Chonburi	(Thailand) Witthaya Laohakul (interim)	End of interim spell	9 November 2025	10th	(Thailand) Rangsan Viwatchaichok	12 November 2025
Kanchanaburi Power	(Spain) Joaquín Gómez	Sacked	27 November 2025	14th	(Thailand) Wasapol Kaewpaluk	27 November 2025
Nakhon Ratchasima	(Thailand) Issara Sritaro	Sacked	29 November 2025	16th	(Thailand) Surapong Kongthep	1 December 2025
Lamphun Warriors	(Thailand) Jongsarit Wutchuay (interim)	End of interim spell	15 December 2025	14th	(Germany) Dennis Amato	15 December 2025
Muangthong United	(Thailand) Uthai Boonmoh (interim)	End of interim spell	29 December 2025	13th	(Croatia) Mario Ivanković	29 December 2025
Sukhothai	(Thailand) Aktaporn Chalitaporn	Sacked	29 January 2026	11th	(Thailand) Rattee Ueathanaphaisarn (Interim)	29 January 2026
BG Pathum United	(Japan) Masatada Ishii	Sacked	6 February 2026	5th	(Montenegro) Vladimir Vujović	6 February 2026
Muangthong United	(Croatia) Mario Ivanković	Resigned	28 February 2026	15th	(Brazil) Jose Alves Borges	28 February 2026
Sukothai	(Thailand) Rattee Ueathanaphaisarn (Interim)	End of interim spell	1 March 2026	12th	(Thailand) Ekalak Thong-am	1 March 2026
Kanchanaburi Power	(Thailand) Wasapol Kaewpaluk	Resigned	6 April 2026	14th	(South Korea) Lee Jung-soo	9 April 2026
Rayong	(Thailand) Jukkapant Punpee	Signed by (Thailand) U20	6 May 2026	9th		

== Foreign players ==
Each team can register a maximum of seven foreign players and an unlimited number of players from the AFF member countries. However, only five foreign players and two AFF players are allowed in the line-up for each match.

- Players named in **bold** indicates the player was registered during the mid-season transfer window.
- Former players named in italics are players that were out of squad or left the club within the season, after the pre-season transfer window, or in the mid-season transfer window, and at least had one appearance.
- Unregistered players refer to players who are not registered for the Thai League but still contracted to the team for other competitions.

Note: Flags indicate national team as has been defined under FIFA eligibility rules. Players may hold more than one non-FIFA nationality.

Team	Players						
Ayutthaya United	Player 1	Player 2	Player 3	Player 4	Player 5	Player 6	Player 7
Ayutthaya United	(Brazil) Caíque	(Brazil) Conrado	(Brazil) Diego Carioca	(Brazil) Wellington Priori	(Palestine) **Yashir Islame**	(South Korea) **Baek Sung-dong**	(South Korea) Hwang Hyun-soo
Ayutthaya United	AFF Player 1	AFF Player 2	AFF Player 3	AFF Player 4	AFF Player 5	Unregistered Players	Former Players
Ayutthaya United	(Philippines) **Noah Leddel**						(Brazil) Eduardo Kau (Philippines) Dylan De Bruycker (Spain) Néstor Albiach
Bangkok United	Player 1	Player 2	Player 3	Player 4	Player 5	Player 6	Player 7
Bangkok United	(Brazil) **Arthur Moura**	(Brazil) Everton	(Brazil) Philipe Maia	(Brazil) **Rivaldinho**	(Montenegro) **Nebojša Kosović**	(Netherlands) Ilias Alhaft	(Oman) Muhsen Al-Ghassani
Bangkok United	AFF Player 1	AFF Player 2	AFF Player 3	AFF Player 4	AFF Player 5	Unregistered Players	Former Players
Bangkok United	(Indonesia) Pratama Arhan					(Curaçao) Richairo Živković (Japan) Seia Kunori (South Korea) Lee Ki-je	(Serbia) Luka Adžić (Singapore) Kyoga Nakamura
BG Pathum United	Player 1	Player 2	Player 3	Player 4	Player 5	Player 6	Player 7
BG Pathum United	(Brazil) Matheus Fornazari	(Brazil) **Raniel**	(Georgia (country)) Nika Sandokhadze	(Japan) Gakuto Notsuda	(Japan) **Riku Matsuda**	(Japan) Tomoyuki Doi	(Japan) **Yoshiaki Takagi**
BG Pathum United	AFF Player 1	AFF Player 2	AFF Player 3	AFF Player 4	AFF Player 5	Unregistered Players	Former Players
BG Pathum United	(Cambodia) Takaki Ose	(Laos) Phoutthavong Sangvilay	(Singapore) **Ikhsan Fandi**				(Argentina) Joel López Pissano (Bosnia and Herzegovina) Slaviša Bogdanović (Montenegro) Miloš Drinčić (Senegal) Seydine N'Diaye (Singapore) Jordan Emaviwe
Buriram United	Player 1	Player 2	Player 3	Player 4	Player 5	Player 6	Player 7
Buriram United	(Austria) Peter Žulj	(Austria) Robert Žulj	(Brazil) **Eduardo Mancha**	(Brazil) Guilherme Bissoli	(Serbia) Goran Čaušić	(South Korea) Ko Myeong-seok	(Spain) **Rubén Sánchez**
Buriram United	AFF Player 1	AFF Player 2	AFF Player 3	AFF Player 4	AFF Player 5	Unregistered Players	Former Players
Buriram United	(Indonesia) Sandy Walsh	(Philippines) Neil Etheridge	(Singapore) Ilhan Fandi			(Australia) Curtis Good (Denmark) **Kasper Junker** (Ghana) **Emmanuel Toku** (Ghana) **Kingsley Schindler** (Montenegro) Filip Stojković	(Brazil) Lucas Crispim (Germany) Robert Bauer (Indonesia) Shayne Pattynama (Serbia) Đorđe Despotović (Serbia) Fejsal Mulić (Serbia) Nemanja Nikolić (Spain) Juan Ibiza
Chiangrai United	Player 1	Player 2	Player 3	Player 4	Player 5	Player 6	Player 7
Chiangrai United	(Brazil) Carlos Iury	(Brazil) Dudu	(Brazil) Gabriel Henrique	(Brazil) Hélio	(Brazil) Victor Cardozo	(Japan) Itsuki Enomoto	(South Korea) Lee Seung-won
Chiangrai United	AFF Player 1	AFF Player 2	AFF Player 3	AFF Player 4	AFF Player 5	Unregistered Players	Former Players
Chiangrai United	(Singapore) **Jordan Emaviwe**					(South Korea) Sim Seung-hyeon	
Chonburi	Player 1	Player 2	Player 3	Player 4	Player 5	Player 6	Player 7
Chonburi	(Brazil) Jorge Fellipe	(Brazil) Queven	(Colombia) **Estefano Arango**	(Ghana) **Richmond Darko**	(Netherlands) Oege-Sietse van Lingen	(Sudan) Abo Eisa	
Chonburi	AFF Player 1	AFF Player 2	AFF Player 3	AFF Player 4	AFF Player 5	Unregistered Players	Former Players
Chonburi	(Philippines) Jefferson Tabinas	(Philippines) Kevin Ray Mendoza	(Philippines) Kike Linares				(Democratic Republic of the Congo) Jonathan Bolingi (France) Greg Houla (Ghana) Lesley Ablorh
Kanchanaburi Power	Player 1	Player 2	Player 3	Player 4	Player 5	Player 6	Player 7
Kanchanaburi Power	(Algeria) Mehdi Tahrat	(Brazil) Ewerton	(England) Andros Townsend	(Guinea) Mohamed Mara	(Mauritania) Aboubakar Kamara	(Spain) Alain Oyarzun	
Kanchanaburi Power	AFF Player 1	AFF Player 2	AFF Player 3	AFF Player 4	AFF Player 5	Unregistered Players	Former Players
Kanchanaburi Power	(Malaysia) Ezequiel Agüero	(Philippines) Diego Bardanca	(Philippines) John Lucero	(Singapore) Anumanthan Kumar	(Singapore) Ryhan Stewart		(England) Ismaila Diallo (Luxembourg) Gerson Rodrigues
Lamphun Warriors	Player 1	Player 2	Player 3	Player 4	Player 5	Player 6	Player 7
Lamphun Warriors	(Brazil) Ralph	(Brazil) Willen	(England) Charlie Clough	(France) Aly Cissokho	(Germany) **Dominik Schad**	(Syria) Mohammed Osman	(Togo) Peniel Mlapa
Lamphun Warriors	AFF Player 1	AFF Player 2	AFF Player 3	AFF Player 4	AFF Player 5	Unregistered Players	Former Players
Lamphun Warriors	(Myanmar) Maung Maung Lwin	(Philippines) **Kenshiro Daniels**	(Philippines) Oskari Kekkonen				
Muangthong United	Player 1	Player 2	Player 3	Player 4	Player 5	Player 6	Player 7
Muangthong United	(Austria) Armin Gremsl	(Brazil) **Willian Popp**	(Bulgaria) Stefan Tsonkov	(Morocco) Anass Ahannach	(Serbia) **Marko Šarić**	(South Korea) **Kim Dong-su**	(Uganda) Melvyn Lorenzen
Muangthong United	AFF Player 1	AFF Player 2	AFF Player 3	AFF Player 4	AFF Player 5	Unregistered Players	Former Players
Muangthong United	(Philippines) John-Patrick Strauß	(Philippines) Michael Kempter				(Nigeria) Nelson Orji (Sweden) Emil Roback	(Brazil) Batata (Brazil) Diego Reis (Germany) Kenan Dünnwald-Turan (Ghana) Richmond Darko
Nakhon Ratchasima	Player 1	Player 2	Player 3	Player 4	Player 5	Player 6	Player 7
Nakhon Ratchasima	(Brazil) Brandao de Souza	(Brazil) Dennis Murillo	(Brazil) **Mateus Lima**	(Brazil) Wendel Matheus	(Colombia) **Jork Becerra**	(Japan) **Yuki Kusano**	(Serbia) Nenad Lalić
Nakhon Ratchasima	AFF Player 1	AFF Player 2	AFF Player 3	AFF Player 4	AFF Player 5	Unregistered Players	Former Players
Nakhon Ratchasima	(Myanmar) **Hein Phyo Win**	(Singapore) Bill Mamadou	(Singapore) **Jared Gallagher**			(France) **Quentin Cornette**	(Japan) Hirotaka Mita (Serbia) Dejan Meleg (South Sudan) **Manny Aguek** (Spain) Viti Martínez
Port	Player 1	Player 2	Player 3	Player 4	Player 5	Player 6	Player 7
Port	(Brazil) Kaká Mendes	(Brazil) **Leonardo Kalil**	(Brazil) Lucas Tocantins	(Brazil) Matheus Lins	(Colombia) Brayan Perea	(Iraq) Rebin Sulaka	(Japan) Noboru Shimura
Port	AFF Player 1	AFF Player 2	AFF Player 3	AFF Player 4	AFF Player 5	Unregistered Players	Former Players
Port	(Indonesia) Asnawi Mangkualam	(Philippines) Michael Falkesgaard	(Singapore) Irfan Fandi				(Brazil) Matheus Pato
PT Prachuap	Player 1	Player 2	Player 3	Player 4	Player 5	Player 6	Player 7
PT Prachuap	(Brazil) Airton	(Brazil) Bernardo Vilar	(Brazil) Michel	(Brazil) Tauã	(Japan) **Koki Tsukagawa**	(South Korea) **Lee Jeong-hyeop**	(Spain) Édgar Méndez
PT Prachuap	AFF Player 1	AFF Player 2	AFF Player 3	AFF Player 4	AFF Player 5	Unregistered Players	Former Players
PT Prachuap	(Cambodia) Nick Taylor	(Philippines) Adrian Ugelvik	(Philippines) Jesper Nyholm				(Brazil) Rodrigo Dias (France) Romain Habran (Montenegro) Srđan Krstović (Nigeria) **Aaron Samuel Olanare**
Ratchaburi	Player 1	Player 2	Player 3	Player 4	Player 5	Player 6	Player 7
Ratchaburi	(Brazil) Denílson	(Brazil) **Gleyson**	(Brazil) Negueba	(Brazil) Sidcley	(France) Gabriel Mutombo	(Madagascar) Njiva Rakotoharimalala	(Spain) Tana
Ratchaburi	AFF Player 1	AFF Player 2	AFF Player 3	AFF Player 4	AFF Player 5	Unregistered Players	Former Players
Ratchaburi	(Brunei) Faiq Bolkiah	(Malaysia) **Daniel Ting**	(Philippines) Jesse Curran			(Spain) **Roque Mesa**	(France) Ottman Dadoune (France) Romain Habran (Martinique) Jérémy Corinus (Scotland) Scott Allardice (Senegal) Seydine N'Diaye (Singapore) Ikhsan Fandi
Rayong	Player 1	Player 2	Player 3	Player 4	Player 5	Player 6	Player 7
Rayong	(Brazil) João Afonso	(Brazil) Stênio Júnior	(Brazil) **Weslen Junior**	(Canada) Keven Alemán	(Canada) Stefan Cebara	(Japan) Ryoma Ito	(Serbia) Veljko Filipović
Rayong	AFF Player 1	AFF Player 2	AFF Player 3	AFF Player 4	AFF Player 5	Unregistered Players	Former Players
Rayong	(Philippines) Manny Ott					(Japan) Hiromichi Katano	(Brazil) Júnior Batista
Sukhothai	Player 1	Player 2	Player 3	Player 4	Player 5	Player 6	Player 7
Sukhothai	(Brazil) Cláudio	(Brazil) Gildo	(Brazil) **Lucas Barreto**	(Brazil) Mateusinho	(Brazil) Romeu Martins	(Madagascar) John Baggio	(Portugal) **João Paredes**
Sukhothai	AFF Player 1	AFF Player 2	AFF Player 3	AFF Player 4	AFF Player 5	Unregistered Players	Former Players
Sukhothai						(Japan) Eito Ishimoto	(Brazil) Elias
Uthai Thani	Player 1	Player 2	Player 3	Player 4	Player 5	Player 6	Player 7
Uthai Thani	(Brazil) Bruno Baio	(Brazil) **Kelvin**	(Brazil) **Leandro Ribeiro**	(Guinea-Bissau) Marcelo Djaló	(Senegal) Christian Gomis	(Sudan) Mohamed Eisa	(Switzerland) Martin Angha
Uthai Thani	AFF Player 1	AFF Player 2	AFF Player 3	AFF Player 4	AFF Player 5	Unregistered Players	Former Players
Uthai Thani	(Myanmar) Soe Moe Kyaw	(Singapore) Harhys Stewart					(Montenegro) Srđan Krstović (Nigeria) Chigozie Mbah

=== Foreign players by confederation ===
Foreign players by confederation
AFC	Brunei (1), Cambodia (2), Indonesia (4), Iraq (1), Japan (8), Laos (1), Malaysia (2), Myanmar (2), Oman (1), Palestine (1), Philippines (15), Singapore (8), South Korea (4), Syria (1)
CAF	Algeria (1), DR Congo (1), Ghana (2), Guinea (1), Guinea-Bissau (1), Madagascar (2), Mauritania (1), Nigeria (3), Senegal (1), Sudan (2), Togo (1), Uganda (1)
CONCACAF	Canada (2), Curacao (2), Martinique (1)
CONMEBOL	Argentina (1), Brazil (35), Colombia (1)
OFC	
UEFA	Austria (3), Bosnia and Herzegovina (1), Bulgaria (1), England (2), France (4), Georgia (1), Germany (1), Luxembourg (1), Montenegro (2), Netherlands (2), Serbia (6), Spain (3), Sweden (1) , Denmark (1)

=== Dual citizenship/heritage players ===
- Players name in **bold** indicates the player was registered during the mid-season transfer window.
- Player's name in italics indicates Overseas Thai players whom have obtained an Thailand passport and citizenship, therefore being considered as local players.

Club	Player 1	Player 2	Player 3	Player 4	Player 5	Player 6
Ayutthaya United	(France) (Thailand) Chakkit Laptrakul ^{2} ^{3}					
Bangkok United	(Germany) (Thailand) Manuel Bihr ^{2} ^{3}	(Nigeria) (Thailand) Wichan Inaram ^{2}				
BG Pathum United	(England) (Thailand) Nathan James ^{2}	(Laos) (Thailand) Surachat Sareepim ^{2} ^{3}	(Sweden) (Thailand) Elias Dolah ^{2} ^{3}	(Sweden) (Thailand) Patrik Gustavsson ^{2} ^{3}		
Buriram United						
Chiangrai United	(Italy) (Thailand) Gionata Verzura ^{2}	(Italy) (Thailand) Marco Ballini ^{2} ^{3}				
Chonburi						
Kanchanaburi Power	(Australia) (Thailand) Aaron Gurd ^{2}	(France) (Thailand) Tony Laurent-Gonnet ^{2}	(Germany) (Thailand) Sumethee Khokpho ^{2}	(Germany) (Thailand) Kritsana Pummarrin ^{2}		
Lamphun Warriors	(France) (Thailand) Nont Muangngam ^{2}	(Germany) (Thailand) Jonas Schwabe ^{2}				
Muangthong United	(England) (Thailand) James Falconer^{2}	(France) (Thailand) Tristan Do ^{2} ^{3}				
Nakhon Ratchasima	(Cyprus) (Thailand) Charalampos Charalampous ^{2}	(England) (Thailand) Leon James ^{2}				
Port	(France) (Laos) (Thailand) Hugo Boutsingkham ^{2}	(Norway) (Thailand) Athit Berg ^{2} ^{3}				
PT Prachuap	(Denmark) (Thailand) Phon-Ek Jensen ^{2}	(Morocco) (Thailand) Oussama Thiangkham ^{2}				
Ratchaburi	(Denmark) (Thailand) Jonathan Khemdee ^{2} ^{3}	(France) (Thailand) Thanawat Suengchitthawon ^{2} ^{3}	(Sweden) (Thailand) Kevin Deeromram ^{2} ^{3}			
Rayong	(Australia) (Thailand) Maxx Creevey ^{2}	(United States) (Thailand) Parkin Harape ^{2}				
Sukhothai	(Germany) (Thailand) Nalu Jandke ^{2}					
Uthai Thani	(England) (Thailand) Danai Smart ^{2}	(England) (Thailand) James Beresford ^{2} ^{3}	(Singapore) (England) (Thailand) Ben Davis ^{2} ^{3}	(Sweden) (Thailand) Kristoffer Ryberg ^{2}	(Sweden) (Thailand) William Weidersjö ^{2}	

Notes:

^2 Carrying Thai heritage.
^3 Capped for Thailand.

== League table ==
Pos	Team	Pld	W	D	L	GF	GA	GD	Pts	Qualification or relegation
1	Buriram United (C)	30	22	4	4	76	31	+45	70	Qualification to the AFC Champions League Elite League stage and ASEAN Club Championship group stage
2	Port	30	18	6	6	59	23	+36	60	Qualification to the AFC Champions League Elite League stage and ASEAN Club Championship group stage
3	Ratchaburi	30	18	5	7	55	30	+25	59	Qualification to the AFC Champions League Elite League stage and ASEAN Club Championship group stage
4	BG Pathum United	30	14	10	6	45	29	+16	52	Qualification for AFC Champions League Two group stage
5	Bangkok United	30	13	11	6	43	32	+11	50	
6	PT Prachuap	30	11	12	7	39	37	+2	45	
7	Chiangrai United	30	9	13	8	36	37	−1	40	
8	Chonburi	30	10	9	11	38	41	−3	39	
9	Rayong	30	9	10	11	44	49	−5	37	
10	Ayutthaya United	30	8	8	14	34	50	−16	32	
11	Uthai Thani	30	7	10	13	39	44	−5	31	
12	Lamphun Warriors	30	4	17	9	35	47	−12	29	
13	Sukhothai	30	6	10	14	23	42	−19	28	
14	Muangthong United (R)	30	6	8	16	27	52	−25	26	Relegation to Thai League 2
15	Nakhon Ratchasima (R)	30	6	6	18	20	44	−24	24	Relegation to Thai League 2
16	Kanchanaburi Power (R)	30	4	11	15	29	54	−25	23	Relegation to Thai League 2

Source: Thai League 1 2025–26
Rules for classification: 1) Points; 2) Goal difference; 3) Goals scored.
(C) Champions; (R) Relegated

=== Positions by round ===
The table lists the positions of teams after each week of matches. In order to preserve chronological evolvements, any postponed matches are not included in the round at which they were originally scheduled, but added to the full round they were played immediately afterwards. For example, if a match is scheduled for matchday 13, but then postponed and played between days 16 and 17, it will be added to the standings for day 16.

Team ╲ Round	1	2	3	4	5	6	7	8	9	10	11	12	13	14	15	16	17	18	19	20	21	22	23	24	25	26	27	28	29	30
Buriram United	3	1	1	1	1	1	1	1	1	1	1	1	1	1	1	1	1	1	1	1	1	1	1	1	1	1	1	1	1	1
Port	1	8	6	10	5	8	6	5	4	3	4	4	3	2	4	3	3	3	4	3	2	3	2	2	2	2	2	2	2	2
Ratchaburi	9	7	3	2	2	2	3	3	3	4	2	3	4	3	2	2	2	2	2	2	3	2	3	3	3	4	3	3	3	3
BG Pathum United	5	3	7	4	6	4	5	4	5	5	5	5	6	5	3	4	5	5	5	5	5	5	5	5	5	5	4	4	4	4
Bangkok United	2	2	4	3	3	3	2	2	2	2	3	2	2	4	5	5	4	4	3	4	4	4	4	4	4	4	5	5	5	5
PT Prachuap	6	11	11	15	12	11	8	8	7	6	6	8	8	8	10	7	7	7	8	8	7	6	6	6	6	6	6	6	6	6
Chiangrai United	7	4	8	7	4	5	7	7	6	8	7	6	7	7	6	6	8	8	9	9	11	9	10	9	10	9	9	8	7	7
Chonburi	11	12	12	14	15	15	15	15	11	12	10	11	13	12	12	12	12	12	11	11	10	11	9	10	9	7	7	9	8	8
Rayong	14	16	15	9	10	6	4	6	8	7	8	7	5	6	7	8	6	6	6	6	6	8	8	8	7	8	8	7	9	9
Ayutthaya United	16	13	5	6	8	13	11	11	12	10	11	10	11	10	9	9	9	9	7	7	8	7	7	7	8	9	9	10	10	10
Uthai Thani	10	14	16	16	16	16	16	16	16	14	12	12	10	11	11	11	10	10	10	10	9	10	11	11	11	11	10	11	11	11
Lamphun Warriors	13	15	14	11	11	14	13	14	15	16	16	15	15	14	14	14	15	13	13	13	13	12	13	13	13	12	12	12	12	12
Sukhothai	15	9	9	12	13	12	10	10	9	9	9	9	9	9	8	10	11	11	12	12	12	13	12	12	12	13	13	13	14	13
Muangthong United	4	5	2	5	7	7	9	9	10	11	13	13	12	13	13	13	14	15	15	15	15	15	15	15	15	15	14	14	13	14
Nakhon Ratchasima	12	6	10	8	9	9	12	12	13	13	15	16	16	16	16	16	16	16	16	16	16	16	16	16	16	16	16	16	15	15
Kanchanaburi Power	8	10	13	13	14	10	14	13	14	15	14	14	14	15	15	15	13	14	14	14	14	14	14	14	14	14	15	15	16	16

Leader and qualification to the 2026–27 AFC Champions League Elite league stage
Qualification to the 2026–27 AFC Champions League Elite league stage
Qualification to the 2026–27 AFC Champions League Two group stage
Relegation to the 2026–27 Thai League 2

Source: Thai League

=== Results by match played ===
Team ╲ Round	1	2	3	4	5	6	7	8	9	10	11	12	13	14	15	16	17	18	19	20	21	22	23	24	25	26	27	28	29	30
Ayutthaya United	L	D	W	D	D	L	D	L	L	W	L	W	D	D	W	W	L	D	W	D	L	W	L	W	L	L	L	L	L	L
Bangkok United	W	D	W	W	L	W	W	D	W	L	D	W	D	D	L	D	W	W	W	W	D	D	D	W	L	L	L	D	W	D
BG Pathum United	D	W	L	W	L	W	D	W	L	W	D	D	W	W	W	D	L	W	D	L	W	W	L	D	D	W	D	W	D	W
Buriram United	W	W	W	W	W	W	D	W	W	L	W	W	W	W	W	D	W	W	L	W	W	W	W	W	D	W	W	L	L	D
Chiangrai United	D	W	L	D	W	D	L	D	W	W	D	L	D	D	W	L	L	D	D	D	L	W	D	L	L	D	W	W	D	W
Chonburi	D	L	D	L	L	D	D	D	W	L	W	L	L	W	D	L	W	L	W	D	W	L	W	L	W	W	L	D	D	W
Kanchanaburi Power	D	D	L	D	L	W	L	D	L	L	D	D	L	D	L	D	W	L	D	D	L	L	L	W	W	L	L	L	D	L
Lamphun Warriors	L	L	D	W	D	L	D	L	L	L	D	D	D	D	D	D	L	W	W	D	D	D	L	D	D	W	L	D	D	D
Muangthong United	W	D	W	L	L	D	D	D	L	L	L	L	W	L	L	L	L	L	L	D	L	D	L	W	L	W	W	D	D	L
Nakhon Ratchasima	D	W	L	D	D	D	L	L	L	L	L	L	L	L	L	L	W	L	L	W	L	L	D	W	D	W	L	L	W	L
Port	W	L	D	L	W	L	W	W	W	W	D	D	W	W	L	W	L	W	L	W	W	D	W	D	W	W	D	W	W	W
PT Prachuap	D	L	D	L	W	D	W	D	W	W	D	L	L	D	L	D	W	D	D	D	W	W	W	D	D	L	W	W	W	L
Rayong	L	L	D	W	D	W	W	D	L	W	D	D	W	D	L	W	W	L	D	L	L	L	D	W	L	L	D	W	L	D
Ratchaburi	D	W	W	W	W	L	L	W	W	W	D	L	W	W	L	W	W	L	W	D	W	L	D	D	W	W	W	L	W	W
Sukhothai	L	W	D	L	D	D	D	W	L	D	W	D	L	W	L	L	D	L	D	D	L	L	W	L	L	L	D	L	L	W
Uthai Thani	D	L	L	L	D	L	D	D	L	W	W	D	W	L	W	L	W	L	D	D	W	L	L	D	D	W	L	D	L	L

Source: Thai League
W = Win; D = Draw; L = Lose

== Results ==
Home \ Away	AYU	BKU	BGP	BRU	CRU	CHO	KBP	LWR	MTU	NRM	POR	PTP	RBM	RAY	SUK	UTT
Ayutthaya United		3–1	0–2	1–4	1–1	1–2	0–2	1–1	2–2	0–1	1–4	1–3	1–3	1–0	1–1	0–1
Bangkok United	4–1		2–1	1–2	1–1	1–0	1–1	4–3	2–0	3–1	1–1	4–1	1–4	3–2	2–0	1–2
BG Pathum United	1–0	0–1		1–3	2–2	2–3	2–1	2–1	3–0	1–0	2–0	3–0	2–2	1–1	2–1	3–0
Buriram United	2–0	0–2	2–2		8–1	5–0	3–1	1–1	2–1	2–1	1–0	2–0	2–0	2–1	6–0	5–1
Chiangrai United	0–0	2–0	1–0	1–2		1–3	2–0	1–1	0–2	2–0	1–2	2–1	1–0	0–1	1–1	1–0
Chonburi	0–1	0–1	1–2	4–2	1–1		1–1	1–0	0–0	2–1	3–2	1–1	0–1	4–1	2–0	1–1
Kanchanaburi Power	1–2	3–3	0–2	1–3	0–4	2–2		4–0	3–0	0–0	1–4	0–0	0–1	1–1	1–0	1–1
Lamphun Warriors	2–0	1–1	1–1	2–3	0–0	2–2	1–1		2–2	2–2	0–2	1–1	1–2	2–2	3–0	2–2
Muangthong United	0–1	0–0	1–1	0–5	2–1	2–3	2–0	1–1		2–1	0–0	1–4	1–3	1–3	1–0	1–0
Nakhon Ratchasima	0–1	1–0	0–1	0–3	1–1	0–0	3–0	0–1	1–1		0–2	1–2	0–2	2–1	1–0	0–0
Port	3–1	0–0	0–0	3–1	1–1	3–0	8–0	3–0	1–0	2–0		3–0	2–1	1–1	5–0	3–1
PT Prachuap	4–4	0–0	2–2	1–1	3–2	2–0	2–0	1–1	2–1	2–0	0–1		1–0	2–0	0–0	2–0
Ratchaburi	1–2	0–1	0–0	2–2	1–2	1–0	1–1	5–0	3–2	1–0	1–0	1–1		6–1	1–0	3–1
Rayong	2–2	1–1	1–1	3–0	1–1	1–0	2–1	1–1	2–0	1–2	5–2	1–1	2–4		2–0	2–1
Sukhothai	1–1	0–0	3–1	0–1	1–1	2–1	1–1	1–2	3–0	2–1	1–0	0–0	1–2	2–1		1–1
Uthai Thani	1–4	1–1	0–1	0–1	1–1	1–1	2–1	0–0	3–1	7–0	0–1	4–0	2–3	4–1	1–1	

Source: Thai League 1 2025–26
Legend: Blue = home team win; Yellow = draw; Red = away team win.
For upcoming matches, an "a" indicates there is an article about the rivalry between the two participants.

== Season statistics ==
=== Top Goalscorers ===
As of 10 May 2026.

Rank	Player	Club	Goals
1	(Brazil) Guilherme Bissoli	Buriram United	23
2	(Brazil) Denílson	Ratchaburi	15
2	(Madagascar) Njiva Rakotoharimalala	Ratchaburi	15
4	(Brazil) Stênio Júnior	Rayong	14
5	(Austria) Robert Žulj	Buriram United	13
5	(Brazil) Bruno Baio	Uthai Thani	13
7	(Japan) Tomoyuki Doi	BG Pathum United	11
7	(Japan) Itsuki Enomoto	Chiangrai United	11
7	(Spain) Édgar Méndez	PT Prachuap	11
10	(Sudan) Mohamed Eisa	Uthai Thani	10

=== Hat-tricks ===
Player	For	Against	Result	Date
(Brazil) Guilherme Bissoli	Buriram United	Uthai Thani	5–1 (H)	24 August 2025
(Austria) Robert Žulj	Buriram United	Muangthong United	5–0 (A)	22 November 2025
(Brazil) Bruno Baio	Uthai Thani	Nakhon Ratchasima	7–0 (H)	29 November 2025
(Brazil) Guilherme Bissoli	Buriram United	Sukhothai	6–0 (H)	21 February 2026
(Madagascar) Njiva Rakotoharimalala^{4}	Ratchaburi	Rayong	6–1 (H)	3 May 2026

=== Clean sheets ===
As of 10 May 2026.

Rank	Player	Club	Clean sheets
1	(Philippines) Michael Falkesgaard	Port	14
2	(Thailand) Saranon Anuin	BG Pathum United	12
3	(Thailand) Patiwat Khammai	Bangkok United	10
3	(Thailand) Wattanachai Srathongjan	PT Prachuap	10
5	(Philippines) Neil Etheridge	Buriram United	9
6	(Thailand) Apirak Worawong	Chiangrai United	8
7	(Thailand) Kampol Pathomakkakul	Ratchaburi	7
8	(Thailand) Warut Mekmusik	Ayutthaya United	5
8	(Thailand) Wichaya Gantong	Rayong	5
8	(Thailand) Kittipun Saensuk	Sukhothai	5
8	(Thailand) Chirawat Wangthaphan	Uthai Thani	5

=== Overall ===
Pos	Team	Total	High	Low	Average	Change
1	Buriram United	273,039	30,726	13,477	18,203	−0.9%
2	BG Pathum United	128,396	13,094	6,165	8,560	+4.4%
3	Chiangrai United	102,055	11,564	3,392	6,804	+101.7%
4	Chonburi	92,793	8,463	4,577	6,186	+29.7%^{†}
5	Kanchanaburi Power	76,416	11,461	3,065	5,094	+152.3%^{†}
6	Muangthong United	75,522	11,413	2,761	5,035	+12.2%
7	Port	74,954	6,250	3,631	4,997	+12.8%
8	Ratchaburi	67,883	8,379	2,891	4,526	+15.6%
9	Rayong	54,195	6,742	2,674	3,613	+2.0%
10	PT Prachuap	50,478	4,110	2,975	3,365	−2.0%
11	Sukhothai	50,384	7,990	1,736	3,359	+41.6%
12	Ayutthaya United	48,888	4,316	2,383	3,259	+185.9%^{†}
13	Nakhon Ratchasima	47,312	6,320	1,020	3,154	−59.4%
14	Uthai Thani	37,848	4,428	1,943	2,523	−21.3%
15	Lamphun Warriors	37,662	5,130	1,454	2,511	−18.8%
16	Bangkok United	30,981	6,329	1,035	2,065	−11.6%
	League total	1,248,506	30,726	1,020	5,202	+7.8%

Updated to games played on 10 May 2026
Source: Thai League 1 2025–26
Notes:
^{†} Teams played previous season in Thai League 2

=== Home match played ===
As of 10 May 2026

Team \ Match played	1	2	3	4	5	6	7	8	9	10	11	12	13	14	15	Total
Ayutthaya United	4,316	3,600	4,263	2,670	3,303	3,316	2,787	3,276	3,130	2,936	4,129	3,134	2,610	2,383	3,035	48,888
Bangkok United	2,032	4,097	6,329	1,279	1,088	1,211	2,003	1,123	1,257	1,622	2,285	2,292	1,035	1,505	1,823	30,981
BG Pathum United	7,478	11,158	8,696	8,171	10,130	6,592	9,307	6,848	6,599	13,094	6,165	8,338	8,070	8,176	9,574	128,396
Buriram United	13,477	15,094	28,051	15,614	14,588	14,466	14,382	17,151	13,603	14,718	13,680	18,455	23,555	25,479	30,726	273,039
Chiangrai United	7,507	11,561	11,564	9,166	6,097	4,332	10,965	7,145	5,120	5,693	5,376	3,392	4,488	5,199	4,450	102,055
Chonburi	5,855	6,187	5,197	5,338	6,501	8,453	5,107	4,577	6,828	5,256	5,909	5,202	6,934	8,463	6,986	92,793
Kanchanaburi Power	4,095	3,416	3,628	4,892	3,450	3,980	3,586	3,825	4,965	3,065	3,872	7,549	11,461	7,268	7,364	76,416
Lamphun Warriors	5,130	2,350	1,563	3,147	2,298	1,551	1,454	2,345	2,149	2,148	2,969	1,569	1,605	2,426	4,958	37,662
Muangthong United	4,723	6,380	5,173	5,178	2,887	4,346	4,918	3,756	2,761	4,425	6,781	3,856	4,140	4,785	11,413	75,522
Nakhon Ratchasima	6,320	5,832	5,221	3,815	2,191	2,398	1,020	3,221	2,021	2,316	5,199	1,921	2,210	1,592	2,035	47,312
Port	6,250	4,854	5,166	4,853	6,250	5,711	4,297	4,081	3,853	5,088	4,283	3,631	4,137	6,250	6,250	74,954
PT Prachuap	3,650	3,174	3,076	3,319	2,975	3,040	3,549	3,075	4,110	3,070	3,397	3,437	3,217	3,363	4,026	50,478
Ratchaburi	5,878	5,842	4,159	3,747	6,947	3,259	3,941	3,974	3,974	3,999	2,991	3,245	2,891	8,379	4,657	67,883
Rayong	3,442	4,019	3,363	2,686	3,842	2,704	4,541	3,175	3,712	3,193	4,003	2,674	3,365	6,742	2,734	54,195
Sukhothai	3,375	2,611	2,035	3,538	1,736	2,463	4,626	2,958	6,550	2,002	1,972	2,072	2,089	4,367	7,990	50,384
Uthai Thani	3,290	2,763	3,174	2,246	2,174	1,943	2,657	2,056	2,154	4,428	2,014	2,010	1,965	2,722	2,252	37,848
League total																1,248,506

Source: Thai League 1 2025–26

== See also ==
- 2025–26 Thai League 2
- 2025–26 Thai League 3
- 2025 Thailand Semi-pro League
- 2026 Thailand Semi-pro League
- 2025 Thailand Amateur League
- 2025–26 Thai FA Cup
- 2025–26 Thai League Cup
- 2025 Thailand Champions Cup
