= 2025–26 BG Pathum United F.C. season =

Association football season

BG Pathum United
2025–26 season
- Chairman: (Thailand) Pavin Bhirombhakdi
- Manager: (Thailand) Supachai Komsilp (till 2 Oct) (Montenegro) Vladimir Vujović (till 29 Oct) (Japan) Masatada Ishii (till 6 Feb) (Montenegro) Vladimir Vujović
- Stadium: BG Stadium, Thanyaburi, Pathum Thani, Thailand
| Home colours | Away colours |

The 2025–26 season is BG Pathum United's sixth consecutive season in Thai League 1, following promotion in 2019.

In addition to the domestic league, the club will also compete in this season's editions of the Thai FA Cup, Thai League Cup, 2025–26 AFC Champions League Two and the 2025–26 ASEAN Club Championship.

== Squad ==
As of 31 July 2024

| No. | Name | Nationality | Date of birth (age) | Previous club | Contract since | Contract end |
Goalkeepers
| 28 | Saranon Anuin | (Thailand) | 24 March 1994 (age 32) | (Thailand) Chiangrai United | 2024 | 2026 |
| 49 | Nalawich Intacharoen | (Thailand) | 11 November 2003 (age 22) | (Singapore) BG Tampines Rovers (S1) | 2023 | 2027 |
| 66 | Chanasorn Kaewyos | (Thailand) | 12 September 2005 (age 20) | (Thailand) Bangkok United | 2026 | 2027 |
| 93 | Pisan Dorkmaikaew | (Thailand) | 10 May 1984 (age 42) | (Thailand) PT Prachuap | 2024 | 2026 |
Defenders
| 2 | Sanchai Nontasila | (Thailand) | 30 March 1996 (age 30) | (Thailand) Ratchaburi | 2024 | 2026 |
| 3 | Takaki Ose | (Cambodia) (Japan) | 19 October 1995 (age 30) | (Cambodia) Phnom Penh Crown (C1) | 2025 | 2027 |
| 15 | Riku Matsuda | (Japan) (Indonesia) | 24 July 1991 (age 35) | (Japan) Vissel Kobe (J1) | 2025 | 2026 |
| 16 | Nika Sandokhadze | (Georgia (country)) | 20 February 1994 (age 32) | (Georgia (country)) FC Torpedo Kutaisi (G1) | 2025 | 2026 |
| 22 | Nathan James | (Thailand) (England) | 28 September 2004 (age 21) | (England) Mickleover (E7) | 2025 | 2027 |
| 24 | Thanawat Pimyotha | (Thailand) | 20 October 2000 (age 25) | (Thailand) Chiangrai United | 2024 | 2027 |
| 29 | Warinthon Jamnongwat | (Thailand) | 21 September 2002 (age 23) | (Thailand) Chainat Hornbill | 2024 | 2026 |
| 33 | Phoutthavong Sangvilay | (Laos) | 16 October 2004 (age 21) | (Laos) Ezra (I1) | 2025 | 2026 |
| 44 | Elias Dolah | (Thailand) (Sweden) | 24 April 1993 (age 33) | (Thailand) Buriram United | 2026 | 2026 |
| 47 | Nuttawut Wongsawang | (Thailand) | 19 April 2004 (age 22) | Youth Team | 2025 | 2026 |
| 81 | Waris Choolthong | (Thailand) | 8 January 2004 (age 22) | Youth Team | 2022 | 2026 |
| 89 | Chonnapat Buaphan | (Thailand) | 22 March 2004 (age 22) | (Japan) Nara Club (J3) | 2022 | 2026 |
Midfielders
| 4 | Chatmongkol Thongkiri | (Thailand) | 5 May 1997 (age 29) | (Thailand) PT Prachuap | 2021 | 2026 |
| 5 | Kritsada Kaman | (Thailand) | 18 March 1999 (age 27) | (Thailand) Chonburi | 2024 | 2027 |
| 6 | Sarach Yooyen | (Thailand) | 30 May 1992 (age 34) | (Japan) Renofa Yamaguchi (J2) | 2020 | 2026 |
| 8 | Ekanit Panya | (Thailand) | 21 October 1999 (age 26) | (Japan) Ehime FC (J2) | 2025 | 2029 |
| 17 | Gakuto Notsuda | (Japan) | 6 June 1994 (age 32) | (Japan) Sanfrecce Hiroshima (J1) | 2024 | 2026 |
| 18 | Chanathip Songkrasin | (Thailand) | 5 October 1993 (age 32) | (Japan) Kawasaki Frontale (J1) | 2023 | 2027 |
| 27 | Pongrawit Jantawong | (Thailand) | 7 October 2000 (age 25) | (Thailand) Chanthaburi | 2025 | 2026 |
| 31 | Yoshiaki Takagi | (Japan) | 9 December 1992 (age 33) | (Japan) Albirex Niigata (J2) | 2026 | 2026 |
Strikers
| 7 | Raniel (Note: Not registered for 1st leg due to injury) | (Brazil) | 11 June 1996 (age 30) | (United Arab Emirates) Khor Fakkan Club (U1) | 2024 | 2026 |
| 9 | Surachat Sareepim | (Thailand) (Laos) | 24 October 1986 (age 39) | (Thailand) Police Tero | 2016 | 2026 |
| 11 | Patrik Gustavsson | (Thailand) (Sweden) | 19 April 2001 (age 25) | (Japan) Nara Club (J3) | 2022 | 2029 |
| 14 | Tomoyuki Doi | (Japan) | 24 November 1997 (age 28) | (Singapore) Geylang International (S1) | 2025 | 2027 |
| 19 | Pichaya Chaiwarangkun | (Thailand) | 7 April 2007 (age 19) | Youth Team | 2025 | 2027 |
| 30 | Itthimon Tippanet | (Thailand) | 30 November 2007 (age 18) | Youth Team | 2025 | 2027 |
| 54 | Kongnat Thuamthongdee | (Thailand) | 25 January 2007 (age 19) | Youth Team | 2025 | |
| 77 | Siwakorn Ponsan | (Thailand) | 24 January 2008 (age 18) | (Thailand) Nakhon Ratchasima; Municipality Sports School | 2025 | 2027 |
| 95 | Matheus Fornazari | (Brazil) (Italy) | 7 October 1995 (age 30) | (Thailand) Sukhothai | 2025 | |
| 97 | Witthawat Phraothaisong | (Thailand) | 21 April 2007 (age 19) | (Singapore) BG Tampines Rovers (S1) | 2025 | 2026 |
| 99 | Ikhsan Fandi | (Singapore) (South Africa) | 9 April 1999 (age 27) | (Thailand) Ratchaburi | 2022 | 2027 |
| | Lucas Andersen | (Denmark) | 13 September 1994 (age 31) | (England) QPR (E2) | 2026 | 2027 |
Players loaned out during season
| 4 | Chaowat Veerachat | (Thailand) | 23 June 1996 (age 30) | (Thailand) Chonburi | 2017 | 2027 |
| 13 | Marco Ballini | (Thailand) (Italy) | 12 June 1998 (age 28) | (Thailand) Chiangrai United | 2024 | 2026 |
| 13 | Jaroensak Wonggorn | (Thailand) | 18 May 1997 (age 29) | (Japan) Cerezo Osaka (J1) | 2024 | 2029 |
| 19 | Thanadol Kaosaart (M) | (Thailand) | 18 August 2001 (age 24) | (Thailand) Nakhon Ratchasima | 2024 | |
| 24 | Kanokpon Buspakom (M) | (Thailand) | 20 September 1999 (age 26) | (Thailand) Nakhon Ratchasima | 2022 | 2027 |
| 26 | Thanet Suknate (D) | (Thailand) | 26 July 2005 (age 21) | (Thailand) Mahasarakham SBT (T2) | 2023 | 2027 |
| 26 | Rattanachat Neamthaisong (G) | (Thailand) | 21 May 2001 (age 25) | (Thailand) Rajpracha | 2025 | |
| 35 | Thanakan Papaphe (M) | (Thailand) | 30 November 2005 (age 20) | Youth Team | 2025 | 2026 |
| 45 | Nattawut Suksum (F) | (Thailand) | 6 November 1997 (age 28) | (Thailand) Ayutthaya United | 2024 | |
| 49 | Khatawut Poladao (D) | (Thailand) | 21 April 2006 (age 20) | Youth Team | 2025 | 2026 |
| 50 | Teerapat Pruetong | (Thailand) | 17 February 2007 (age 19) | (Thailand) PTT Academy | 2025 | 2026 |
| 55 | Chanon Thamma (D) | (Thailand) | 19 March 2004 (age 22) | (Thailand) Chanthaburi | 2025 | 2027 |
| 59 | Anan Samaae (M) | (Thailand) | 11 November 2005 (age 20) | Youth Team | 2025 | 2027 |
| 62 | Airfan Doloh | (Thailand) | 26 January 2001 (age 25) | (Thailand) Ayutthaya United | 2024 | 2027 |
| 85 | Issarapong Waewdee (G) | (Thailand) | 1 October 2004 (age 21) | (Thailand) Debsirin School | 2023 | |
| 91 | Ilhan Fandi | (Singapore) (South Africa) | 8 November 2002 (age 23) | (Belgium) K.M.S.K. Deinze (B2) | 2024 | 2028 |
| | Thanakrit Laorkai (M) | (Thailand) | 22 December 2003 (age 22) | (Thailand) Nakhon Si United | | 2027 |
| | Thitipat Ekarunpong | (Thailand) | 5 January 2005 (age 21) | (Japan) FC Tiamo Hirakata (J4) | | |
Players left during season
| 1 | Slaviša Bogdanović (Note: Registered for ACL 2 only) | (Bosnia and Herzegovina) | 11 October 1993 (age 32) | (Saudi Arabia) Al-Ain (S2) | 2025 | |
| 10 | Joel López Pissano | (Argentina) | 6 January 1997 (age 29) | (Bolivia) Club San José (B1) | 2025 | |
| 15 | Miloš Drinčić | (Montenegro) | 14 February 1999 (age 27) | (India) Kerala Blasters (I1) | 2025 | |
| 21 | Sivakorn Tiatrakul | (Thailand) | 7 July 1994 (age 32) | (Thailand) PT Prachuap | 2024 | 2027 |
| 23 | Jordan Emaviwe | (Singapore) (Nigeria) | 9 April 2001 (age 25) | (Thailand) Chiangrai United | 2025 | 2027 |
| 69 | Seydine N'Diaye | (France) (Niger) | 23 April 1998 (age 28) | (Finland) Ilves (F1) | 2024 | 2026 |
Players not registered

== Coaching staff ==
The following list displays the coaching staff of all the BG Pathum United current football sections:

First Team

| Position | Name |
|---|---|
| Chairman | (Thailand) Pavin Bhirombhakdi (till 22 Sept 2025) |
| Head Coach | (Thailand) Supachai Komsilp (till 2 Oct 2025) (Serbia) Vladimir Vujović (till 29 Oct 2025) (Japan) Masatada Ishii |
| Asst. Coach | (Thailand) Amnart Kaewkhew (till 29 Oct 2025) (Serbia) Vladimir Vujović (till 29 Oct 2025) (Thailand) Pichitphong Choeichiu (Japan) Mitsuo Kato < |
| Goalkeeper Coach | (Brazil) Marquinhos Domingues (Thailand) Kittisak Rawangpa |
| Interpreter | (Thailand) Hasdin Sukkoki |
| Doctor | (Thailand) Pakapon Issaragrisil |
| Physiotherapist | (Thailand) Yongsak Lertdamrongkiet (Thailand) Saranyoo Kheawlek (Thailand) Chalotorn Chaisiri |
| Fitness Trainer | (Brazil) Neri Caldeira (Thailand) Auttapon Boonsan |
| Nutritionist | (Thailand) Thanatpong Sukwong |

== Transfer ==
=== In ===
Pre-Season

| Date | Position | Player | Transferred from | Ref |
First team
| 1 June 2025 | GK | (Thailand) Kiadtiphon Udom | (Thailand) Phrae United (T2) | Loan Return (Note: Kiadtiphon Udom returned and moved to Phrae United permanently after contract end.) |
| 1 June 2025 | GK | (Thailand) Kittipong Phuthawchueak | (Thailand) Kanchanaburi Power (T2) | Loan Return (Note: Kittipong Phuthawchueak returned and moved to Muangthong United permanently after contract end.) |
| 1 June 2025 | DF | (Thailand) Thanawat Pimyotha | (Thailand) Chiangrai United | Loan Return |
| 1 June 2025 | DF | (Thailand) Apisit Sorada | (Thailand) Ratchaburi | Loan Return |
| 1 June 2025 | DF | (Thailand) Chonnapat Buaphan | (Japan) Nara Club (J3) | Early Termination |
| 1 June 2025 | DF | (Thailand) Adisak Sosungnoen | (Thailand) Khon Kaen United | Loan Return |
| 1 June 2025 | DF | (Brazil) Victor Cardozo | (Thailand) Lamphun Warriors | Loan Return (Note: Victor Cardozo left club after contract end) |
| 1 June 2025 | DF | (Thailand) Shinnaphat Leeaoh | (Thailand) Ratchaburi | Loan Return (Note: Shinnaphat Leeaoh moved to Buriram United after his loan with Ratchaburi end.) |
| 1 June 2025 | MF | (Thailand) Chatmongkol Thongkiri | (Thailand) PT Prachuap | Loan Return |
| 1 June 2025 | MF | (Thailand) Sivakorn Tiatrakul | (Thailand) PT Prachuap | Loan Return (Note: Sivakorn Tiatrakul 2 years loan terminated early as he is recalled to be part of the first team.) |
| 1 June 2025 | MF | (Thailand) Chaowat Veerachat | (Thailand) Chonburi (T2) | Loan Return (Note: Chaowat Veerachat returns before going on loan to PT Prachuap) |
| 1 June 2025 | MF | (Thailand) Jaroensak Wonggorn | (Japan) Cerezo Osaka (J1) | Early Termination |
| 1 June 2025 | MF | (Thailand) Ekanit Panya | (Japan) Ehime (J2) | Early Termination |
| 1 June 2025 | FW | (Uganda) (Germany) (England) Melvyn Lorenzen | (Thailand) Muangthong United | Loan Return (Note: Melvyn Lorenzen returns to Muangthong United permanently after his contract end) |
| 17 June 2025 | FW | (Japan) Tomoyuki Doi | (Singapore) Geylang International | Free |
| 18 June 2025 | DF | (Montenegro) Miloš Drinčić | (India) Kerala Blasters | Free |
| 19 June 2025 | DF | (Laos) Phoutthavong Sangvilay | (Laos) Ezra | Season loan |
| 19 June 2025 | MF | (Thailand) Pongrawit Jantawong | (Thailand) Chanthaburi | Free |
| 19 June 2025 | FW | (Brazil) (Italy) Matheus Fornazari | (Thailand) Sukhothai | Free |
| 20 June 2025 | DF | (Thailand) Chanon Thamma | (Thailand) Chanthaburi | Free |
| 20 June 2025 | DF | (Singapore) (Nigeria) Jordan Emaviwe | (Thailand) Chiangrai United | Free |
| 25 June 2025 | GK | (Bosnia and Herzegovina) Slaviša Bogdanović | (Saudi Arabia) Al-Ain | Free |
| 1 July 2025 | GK | (Thailand) Rattanachat Neamthaisong | (Thailand) Rajpracha | Free |
| 3 July 2025 | DF | (Thailand) (England) Nathan James | (England) Barnsley | Free |
| 4 July 2025 | MF | (Argentina) Joel López Pissano | (Bolivia) Club San José | Free |
| 5 July 2025 | DF | (Cambodia) (Japan) Takaki Ose | (Cambodia) Phnom Penh Crown | Free |
| 6 July 2025 | FW | (Thailand) Siwakorn Ponsan | (Thailand) Nakhon Ratchasima Municipality Sports School | Free |
Academy
| 1 June 2025 | GK | (Thailand) Nalawich Intacharoen | (Thailand) Nakhon Si United (T2) | Loan Return |
| 1 June 2025 | DF | (Thailand) Thawatchai Inprakhon | (Japan) Nara Club (J3) | Early Termination |
| 1 June 2025 | MF | (Thailand) Thanakrit Laorkai | (Thailand) Nakhon Si United (T2) | Loan Return |
| 1 June 2025 | MF | (Thailand) Thanadol Kaosaart | (Thailand) Nakhon Ratchasima | Loan Return |
| 1 June 2025 | MF | (Thailand) Nanthiphat Chaiman | (Singapore) BG Tampines Rovers (S1) | Loan Return |
| 1 June 2025 | MF | (Thailand) Witthawat Phraothaisong | (Singapore) BG Tampines Rovers (S1) | Loan Return |
| 1 June 2025 | FW | (Thailand) Thitipat Ekarunpong | (Japan) Tiamo Hirakata (J4) | Early Termination |

Mid-Season

| Date | Position | Player | Transferred from | Ref |
First team
| 17 December 2025 | MF | (Thailand) Airfan Doloh | (Thailand) Ayutthaya United | End of loan |
| 18 December 2025 | DF | (Japan) (Indonesia) Riku Matsuda | (Japan) Vissel Kobe | Free |
| 19 December 2025 | FW | (Singapore) (South Africa) Ikhsan Fandi | (Thailand) Ratchaburi | Early termination of loan |
| 3 January 2026 | MF | (Japan) Yoshiaki Takagi | (Japan) Albirex Niigata | Free |
| 16 January 2026 | DF | (Thailand) (Sweden) Elias Dolah | (Thailand) Buriram United | Season Loan |
Academy
| 23 December 2025 | GK | (Thailand) Nalawich Intacharoen | (Singapore) BG Tampines Rovers (S1) | Early termination of loan |
| 24 December 2025 | FW | (Thailand) Chinnawat Prachuabmon | (Thailand) Chiangrai United | Early termination of loan |
| 26 December 2025 | MF | (Thailand) Witthawat Phraothaisong | (Singapore) BG Tampines Rovers (S1) | Early termination of loan |
| 31 December 2025 | MF | (Thailand) Thanakrit Laorkai | (Japan) Tiamo Hirakata (J4) | Loan Return |
| 31 December 2025 | MF | (Thailand) Wachirawut Saenchek | (Thailand) Police Tero (T2) | Loan Return |
| 2 January 2026 | MF | (Thailand) Thanadol Kaosaart | (Thailand) Chanthaburi (T2) | Loan Return |
| 5 January 2026 | DF | (Thailand) Thanawat Pimyotha | (Thailand) Chiangrai United | Loan Return |
| 7 January 2026 | DF | (Thailand) Thanet Suknate | (Thailand) Mahasarakham SBT (T2) | Loan Return |
| 11 January 2026 | GK | (Thailand) Chanasorn Kaewyos | (Thailand) Bangkok United | Free |

Post-season transfer

| Date | Position | Player | Transferred from | Fee | Ref |
First team
| 1 April 2026 | MF | (Denmark) Lucas Andersen | (England) QPR | Free | |
| 31 May 2026 | DF | (Thailand) (Italy) Marco Ballini | (Thailand) Chiangrai United | End of loan | |
| 31 May 2026 | MF | (Thailand) Chaowat Veerachat | (Thailand) PT Prachuap | End of loan | |
| 31 May 2026 | MF | (Thailand) Airfan Doloh | (Thailand) Uthai Thani | End of loan | |
| 31 May 2026 | MF | (Thailand) Jaroensak Wonggorn | (Thailand) Ratchaburi | End of loan | |
| 31 May 2026 | FW | (Thailand) Chinnawat Prachuabmon | (Thailand) Chiangrai United | End of loan | |
| 31 May 2026 | FW | (Singapore) (South Africa) Ilhan Fandi | (Thailand) Buriram United | End of loan | |
| 2026 | DF | (Thailand) Saharat Pongsuwan | (Thailand) Rayong | Free | |
| 2026 | DF | (Uruguay) Yeferson Quintana | (Brazil) Paysandu | Free | |
| 2026 | MF | (Thailand) Akarapong Pumwisat | (Thailand) Lamphun Warriors | Free | |
| 2026 | MF | (Thailand) Phakapon Boonchuay | (Thailand) Trat | Free | |
| 2026 | FW | (Brazil) Carlos Iury | (Thailand) Chiangrai United | Free | |
| 2026 | FW | (Ukraine) Mykola Kovtalyuk | (Romania) Botoșani | Free | |
Academy
| 31 May 2026 | GK | (Thailand) Rattanachat Neamthaisong | (Thailand) Nakhon Si United (T2) | End of loan | |
| 31 May 2026 | GK | (Thailand) Issarapong Waewdee | (Thailand) Customs United (T3) | End of loan | |
| 31 May 2026 | DF | (Thailand) Khatawut Poladao | (Thailand) Customs United (T3) | End of loan | |
| 31 May 2026 | DF | (Thailand) Thanet Suknate | (Thailand) Ayutthaya United | End of loan | |
| 31 May 2026 | DF | (Thailand) Thanawat Pimyotha | (Thailand) Chiangrai United | End of loan | |
| 31 May 2026 | DF | (Thailand) Thawatchai Inprakhon | (Thailand) Chiangrai United | End of loan | |
| 31 May 2026 | MF | (Thailand) Nanthiphat Chaiman | (Thailand) Chiangrai United | End of loan | |
| 31 May 2026 | MF | (Thailand) Anan Samaae | (Thailand) Customs United (T3) | End of loan | |
| 31 May 2026 | MF | (Thailand) Thanakon Papaphe | (Thailand) Customs United (T3) | End of loan | |
| 31 May 2026 | MF | (Thailand) Kanokpon Buspakom | (Thailand) Chanthaburi (T2) | End of loan | |
| 31 May 2026 | MF | (Thailand) Thanadol Kaosaart | (Thailand) Chanthaburi (T2) | End of loan | |
| 31 May 2026 | MF | (Thailand) Thanadol Kaosaart | (Thailand) Nakhon Si United (T2) | End of loan | |
| 31 May 2026 | MF | (Thailand) Thanakrit Laorkai | (Thailand) Bangkok (T2) | End of loan | |
| 31 May 2026 | FW | (Thailand) Thitipat Ekarunpong | (Thailand) Nakhon Pathom United (T2) | End of loan | |
| 31 May 2026 | FW | (Thailand) Chinnawat Prachuabmon | (Thailand) Nakhon Pathom United (T2) | End of loan | |
| 31 May 2026 | FW | (Thailand) Teerapat Pruetong | (Japan) Hokkaido Consadole Sapporo | End of Loan | |

=== Out ===
Pre-Season

| Date | Position | Player | Transferred To | Ref |
First team
| 1 June 2025 | GK | (Thailand) Kittipong Phuthawchueak | (Thailand) Kanchanaburi Power | Free |
| 1 June 2025 | GK | (Thailand) Kiadtiphon Udom | (Thailand) Phrae United (T2) | Free (Note: Kiadtiphon Udom returned and moved to Phrae United permanently after contract end.) |
| 1 June 2025 | GK | (Thailand) Nattapong Khajohnmalee | (Thailand) Bangkok (T2) | Free |
| 1 June 2025 | GK | (South Korea) Jung Hyeon-ho | (Japan) FC Gifu | Free |
| 1 June 2025 | DF | (South Korea) Hwang Myung-hyun | (Indonesia) PSBS Biak | Free (Note: Hwang Myung-hyun's contract runs till May 2026 but was mutually agreed to be terminated early.) |
| 1 June 2025 | DF | (Brazil) Victor Cardozo | (Thailand) Chiangrai United | Free |
| 1 June 2025 | DF | (Senegal) (France) Christian Gomis | (Thailand) Uthai Thani | Free |
| 1 June 2025 | DF | (Thailand) Shinnaphat Leeaoh | (Thailand) Buriram United | Free |
| 1 June 2025 | DF | (Thailand) Santipharp Chan-ngom | (Thailand) Chonburi | Free |
| 1 June 2025 | MF | (Costa Rica) Freddy Álvarez | (Costa Rica) A.D. Municipal Liberia | Free |
| 1 June 2025 | MF | (Japan) Kodai Tanaka | (Australia) Blacktown City | Free |
| 1 June 2025 | FW | (Thailand) Chananan Pombuppha | (Thailand) Ayutthaya United | Free |
| 1 June 2025 | FW | (Thailand) Teerasil Dangda | (Thailand) Bangkok United | Free |
| 1 June 2025 | FW | (Uganda) (Germany) (England) Melvyn Lorenzen | (Thailand) Muangthong United | Free (Note: Melvyn Lorenzen's contract end and was released after returning from loan.) |
| 1 June 2025 | FW | (Thailand) Chinnawat Prachuabmon | (Thailand) Chiangrai United | Season loan |
| 5 June 2025 | MF | (Thailand) Chaowat Veerachat | (Thailand) PT Prachuap | Season loan |
| 7 June 2025 | FW | (Singapore) (South Africa) Ilhan Fandi | (Thailand) Buriram United | Season loan |
| 8 June 2025 | FW | (Singapore) (South Africa) Ikhsan Fandi | (Thailand) Ratchaburi | Season loan |
| 15 June 2025 | DF | (Thailand) (Italy) Marco Ballini | (Thailand) Chiangrai United | Season loan |
| 1 July 2025 | DF | (Thailand) Apisit Sorada | (Thailand) Ratchaburi | Free |
| 11 July 2025 | DF | (Thailand) Adisak Sosungnoen | (Thailand) Police Tero (T2) | Free |
| 15 July 2025 | FW | (Thailand) Nattawut Suksum | (Thailand) Chanthaburi (T2) | Season loan |
| 11 August 2025 | MF | (Thailand) Airfan Doloh | (Thailand) Ayutthaya United | Loan till Jan-26 |
Academy
| 16 January 2025 | MF | (Thailand) Thanakrit Laorkai | (Japan) FC Tiamo Hirakata (J4) | Season loan till Dec 2025 |
| 8 June 2025 | MF | (Thailand) Anan Samaae | (Thailand) Customs United (T3) | Season loan |
| 30 June 2025 | GK | (Thailand) Nalawich Intacharoen | (Singapore) BG Tampines Rovers (S1) | Season loan till June 2026 |
| 30 June 2025 | MF | (Thailand) Witthawat Phraothaisong | (Singapore) BG Tampines Rovers (S1) | Season loan |
| 1 July 2025 | DF | (Thailand) Thanawat Pimyotha | (Thailand) Chiangrai United | Season loan |
| 3 July 2025 | DF | (Thailand) Thawatchai Inprakhon | (Thailand) Chiangrai United | Undisclosed |
| 3 July 2025 | MF | (Thailand) Nanthiphat Chaiman | (Thailand) Chiangrai United | Season loan |
| 6 July 2025 | DF | (Thailand) Thanet Suknate | (Thailand) Mahasarakham SBT (T2) | Season loan |
| 8 July 2025 | DF | (Thailand) Khatawut Poladao | (Thailand) Customs United (T3) | Season loan |
| 15 July 2025 | MF | (Thailand) Kanokpon Buspakom | (Thailand) Chanthaburi (T2) | Season loan |
| 15 July 2025 | MF | (Thailand) Thanadol Kaosaart | (Thailand) Chanthaburi (T2) | Season loan |
| 29 July 2025 | FW | (Thailand) Thitipat Ekarunpong | (Thailand) Nakhon Pathom United (T2) | Season loan |
| 30 July 2025 | MF | (Thailand) Wachirawut Saenchek | (Thailand) Police Tero (T2) | Season loan till 31 Dec 25 |
| 13 August 2025 | GK | (Thailand) Issarapong Waewdee | (Thailand) Customs United (T3) | Season loan |
| 1 September 2025 | MF | (Thailand) Thanakon Papaphe | (Thailand) Customs United (T3) | Season loan |

Mid-Season

| Date | Position | Player | Transferred To | Ref |
First team
| 18 December 2025 | MF | (Thailand) Airfan Doloh | (Thailand) Uthai Thani | Season loan |
| 19 December 2025 | DF | (Singapore) (Nigeria) Jordan Emaviwe | (Thailand) Chiangrai United | Free |
| 19 December 2025 | MF | (Thailand) Sivakorn Tiatrakul | (Thailand) Port | Free |
| 25 December 2025 | GK | (Bosnia and Herzegovina) Slaviša Bogdanović | (Kyrgyzstan) Asia Talas | Free |
| 25 December 2025 | DF | (Montenegro) Miloš Drinčić | (Montenegro) Buducnost Podgorica | Free |
| 25 December 2025 | DF | (France) (Niger) Seydine N'Diaye | (Thailand) Ratchaburi | Free |
| 25 December 2025 | MF | (Argentina) Joel López Pissano | (Vietnam) SHB Da Nang | Free |
| 31 December 2025 | MF | (Thailand) Jaroensak Wonggorn | (Thailand) Ratchaburi | Season loan |
Academy
| 25 December 2025 | FW | (Thailand) Chinnawat Prachuabmon | (Thailand) Nakhon Pathom United (T2) | Season loan |
| 1 January 2026 | MF | (Thailand) Wachirawut Saenchek | (Thailand) Navy (T3) | Free |
| 3 January 2026 | MF | (Thailand) Thanadol Kaosaart | (Thailand) Nakhon Si United (T2) | Season Loan |
| 7 January 2025 | MF | (Thailand) Thanakrit Laorkai | (Thailand) Bangkok (T2) | Season loan |
| 8 January 2025 | GK | (Thailand) Rattanachat Neamthaisong | (Thailand) Nakhon Si United (T2) | Season loan |
| 8 January 2025 | DF | (Thailand) Thanet Suknate | (Thailand) Ayutthaya United | Season loan |
| 16 January 2026 | DF | (Thailand) Chanon Thamma | (Thailand) Ayutthaya United | Season loan |
| 26 January 2026 | FW | (Thailand) Teerapat Pruetong | (Japan) Hokkaido Consadole Sapporo | Season Loan |

=== Promoted ===
| Position | Player | Ref |

== Friendlies ==
=== Pre-Season Friendly ===
Win Draw Loss

| 12 July 2025 1 | Mahasarakham SBT (Thailand) | 0–2 | (Thailand) BG Pathum United | Maha Sarakham |
| | | Report | Suwat Chanbunpha 82' (o.g.); Jordan Emaviwe 90+3' | Stadium: Mahasarakham Province Stadium; Referee: Winat Phophat |

| 16 July 2025 2 | Khon Kaen United (Thailand) | 2–3 | (Thailand) BG Pathum United | Khon Kaen |
| | Felipe Amorim 9'; Arthit Boodjinda 90+5' | Report | Matheus Fornazari 14'; Tomoyuki Doi 43'; Sivakorn Tiatrakul 90+1' | Stadium: Khon Kaen Provincial Administrative Organization Stadium |

| 19 July 2025 3 | Buriram United (Thailand) | 2–1 | (Thailand) BG Pathum United | Buriram |
| | Robert Žulj 40'; Ilhan Fandi 98' | | Tomoyuki Doi 28' | Stadium: Buriram City Stadium |

| 26 July 2025 4 | BG Pathum United (Thailand) | cancelled | (Thailand) Uthai Thani | Pathum Thani |
| | | | | Stadium: BG Pathum United Training Ground |

| 3 August 2025 5 | Songkhla (Thailand) | 0–2 | (Thailand) BG Pathum United | Songkhla |
| | | | Sanchai Nontasila 5'; Matheus Fornazari 84' | Stadium: Tinsulanon Stadium |

| 9 August 2025 6 | BG Pathum United (Thailand) | cancelled | (Thailand) Chiangrai United | Pathum Thani |
| | | | | Stadium: BG Pathum United Training Ground |

=== Mid-Season Friendly ===
| 11 October 2025 1 | Buriram United (Thailand) | 1–1 | (Thailand) BG Pathum United | Songkhla |
| | | | | Stadium: Tinsulanon Stadium |

== Team statistics ==
=== Appearances and goals ===
As of 24 May 26

| No. | Pos. | Player | League 1 | | FA Cup | | League Cup | | AFC Champions League Two | | ASEAN Club Championship | | Total | |
| No. | Pos. | Player | Apps. | Goals | Apps. | Goals | Apps. | Goals | Apps. | Goals | Apps. | Goals | Apps. | Goals |
|---|---|---|---|---|---|---|---|---|---|---|---|---|---|---|
| 2 | DF | (Thailand) Sanchai Nontasila | 9+9 | 2 | 1 | 2 | 1+2 | 0 | 3+1 | 0 | 3+1 | 0 | 30 | 4 |
| 3 | DF | (Cambodia) Takaki Ose | 15+1 | 0 | 1 | 0 | 2 | 0 | 2+2 | 0 | 4 | 0 | 27 | 0 |
| 4 | MF | (Thailand) Chatmongkol Thongkiri | 8+8 | 0 | 1 | 1 | 1+1 | 0 | 3+2 | 0 | 3+2 | 0 | 29 | 1 |
| 5 | MF | (Thailand) Kritsada Kaman | 21+4 | 1 | 2+1 | 0 | 4 | 0 | 6 | 0 | 2+2 | 1 | 41 | 2 |
| 6 | MF | (Thailand) Sarach Yooyen | 13+10 | 0 | 1+1 | 0 | 4+1 | 0 | 1+1 | 0 | 3+2 | 0 | 37 | 0 |
| 7 | FW | (Brazil) Raniel | 8 | 2 | 0 | 0 | 1 | 0 | 2 | 0 | 1 | 1 | 12 | 3 |
| 8 | MF | (Thailand) Ekanit Panya | 21+6 | 4 | 0+2 | 0 | 2+1 | 0 | 3+3 | 0 | 2+2 | 0 | 42 | 4 |
| 9 | FW | (Thailand) (Laos) Surachat Sareepim | 8+6 | 3 | 1+2 | 2 | 3+2 | 2 | 2+1 | 0 | 2+2 | 1 | 28 | 8 |
| 11 | FW | (Thailand) (Sweden) Patrik Gustavsson | 3+4 | 2 | 0 | 0 | 1+2 | 0 | 0 | 0 | 0 | 0 | 10 | 2 |
| 13 | MF | (Thailand) Jaroensak Wonggorn | 6+4 | 0 | 0 | 0 | 0 | 0 | 2 | 0 | 2+1 | 0 | 15 | 0 |
| 14 | FW | (Japan) Tomoyuki Doi | 17+8 | 11 | 1 | 0 | 2 | 0 | 1+4 | 1 | 3+1 | 1 | 37 | 13 |
| 15 | DF | (Japan) (Indonesia) Riku Matsuda | 7+4 | 0 | 1 | 0 | 4 | 0 | 0 | 0 | 0 | 0 | 16 | 0 |
| 16 | DF | (Georgia (country)) Nika Sandokhadze | 25+3 | 4 | 1 | 0 | 3+1 | 0 | 4 | 0 | 3 | 0 | 40 | 4 |
| 17 | MF | (Japan) Gakuto Notsuda | 21+3 | 1 | 0 | 0 | 3+1 | 0 | 2+2 | 0 | 3+1 | 0 | 36 | 1 |
| 18 | MF | (Thailand) Chanathip Songkrasin | 16+8 | 1 | 1+2 | 1 | 3+1 | 0 | 1+4 | 1 | 3+1 | 3 | 40 | 6 |
| 19 | FW | (Thailand) Pichaya Chaiwarangkun | 0 | 0 | 0 | 0 | 0+1 | 0 | 0 | 0 | 0 | 0 | 1 | 0 |
| 22 | DF | (England) (Thailand) Nathan James | 1+1 | 0 | 2 | 0 | 0+1 | 0 | 1 | 0 | 0 | 0 | 6 | 0 |
| 24 | MF | (Thailand) Thanawat Pimyotha | 4+1 | 0 | 1 | 0 | 1 | 0 | 0 | 0 | 0 | 0 | 7 | 0 |
| 27 | MF | (Thailand) Pongrawit Jantawong | 9+7 | 0 | 2+1 | 0 | 0+2 | 1 | 0 | 0 | 1+1 | 0 | 23 | 1 |
| 28 | GK | (Thailand) Saranon Anuin | 30 | 0 | 1 | 0 | 5 | 0 | 0 | 0 | 2 | 0 | 38 | 0 |
| 29 | DF | (Thailand) Warinthon Jamnongwat | 13+4 | 0 | 1+1 | 0 | 3+1 | 0 | 1+1 | 0 | 2 | 0 | 27 | 0 |
| 30 | DF | (Thailand) Itthimon Tippanet | 1+2 | 1 | 0+1 | 1 | 1 | 0 | 0 | 0 | 0 | 0 | 5 | 2 |
| 31 | MF | (Japan) Yoshiaki Takagi | 7+5 | 1 | 1 | 0 | 1+2 | 1 | 0 | 0 | 0 | 0 | 16 | 2 |
| 33 | DF | (Laos) Phoutthavong Sangvilay | 2+2 | 0 | 1 | 0 | 0 | 0 | 2 | 0 | 1 | 0 | 8 | 0 |
| 44 | DF | (Thailand) (Sweden) Elias Dolah | 9+2 | 2 | 0 | 0 | 2 | 0 | 0 | 0 | 1+1 | 0 | 15 | 2 |
| 47 | DF | (Thailand) Nuttawut Wongsawang | 0+1 | 0 | 1 | 0 | 1 | 0 | 1 | 0 | 0 | 0 | 4 | 0 |
| 54 | FW | (Thailand) Kongnat Thuamthongdee | 0 | 0 | 0 | 0 | 0 | 0 | 0 | 0 | 0 | 0 | 0 | 0 |
| 77 | FW | (Thailand) Siwakorn Ponsan | 0+4 | 0 | 1+1 | 1 | 0+2 | 0 | 1 | 0 | 1 | 0 | 10 | 1 |
| 81 | DF | (Thailand) Waris Choolthong | 17+7 | 0 | 1+1 | 0 | 2 | 0 | 3+1 | 0 | 4+1 | 0 | 37 | 0 |
| 89 | DF | (Thailand) Chonnapat Buaphan | 4 | 0 | 1 | 0 | 2+1 | 0 | 1 | 0 | 1 | 0 | 10 | 0 |
| 93 | GK | (Thailand) Pisan Dorkmaikaew | 0+1 | 0 | 2 | 0 | 0 | 0 | 1 | 0 | 1 | 0 | 5 | 0 |
| 95 | FW | (Brazil) (Italy) Matheus Fornazari | 3+10 | 2 | 2 | 4 | 1+1 | 2 | 3+1 | 2 | 1+2 | 0 | 24 | 10 |
| 99 | FW | (Singapore) (South Africa) Ikhsan Fandi | 7 | 5 | 0+1 | 0 | 2 | 4 | 0 | 0 | 1+1 | 1 | 12 | 10 |
Players who have left the club on loan to other club
| 4 | MF | (Thailand) Chaowat Veerachat | 0 | 0 | 0 | 0 | 0 | 0 | 0 | 0 | 0 | 0 | 0 | 0 |
| 13 | DF | (Thailand) (Italy) Marco Ballini | 0 | 0 | 0 | 0 | 0 | 0 | 0 | 0 | 0 | 0 | 0 | 0 |
| 19 | DF | (Thailand) Thanadol Kaosaart | 0 | 0 | 0 | 0 | 0 | 0 | 0 | 0 | 0 | 0 | 0 | 0 |
| 24 | MF | (Thailand) Kanokpon Buspakom | 0 | 0 | 0 | 0 | 0 | 0 | 0 | 0 | 0 | 0 | 0 | 0 |
| 31 | MF | (Thailand) Thawatchai Inprakhon | 0 | 0 | 0 | 0 | 0 | 0 | 0 | 0 | 0 | 0 | 0 | 0 |
| 34 | MF | (Thailand) Wachirawut Saenchek | 0 | 0 | 0 | 0 | 0 | 0 | 0 | 0 | 0 | 0 | 0 | 0 |
| 39 | MF | (Thailand) Thanakorn Papaphe | 0 | 0 | 0 | 0 | 0 | 0 | 0 | 0 | 0 | 0 | 0 | 0 |
| 45 | FW | (Thailand) Nattawut Suksum | 0 | 0 | 0 | 0 | 0 | 0 | 0 | 0 | 0 | 0 | 0 | 0 |
| 49 | DF | (Thailand) Khatawut Poladao | 0 | 0 | 0 | 0 | 0 | 0 | 0 | 0 | 0 | 0 | 0 | 0 |
| 50 | MF | (Thailand) Teerapat Pruetong | 0+3 | 0 | 1+1 | 1 | 0 | 0 | 0+1 | 0 | 0+1 | 0 | 7 | 1 |
| 59 | MF | (Thailand) Anan Samaae | 0 | 0 | 0 | 0 | 0 | 0 | 0 | 0 | 0 | 0 | 0 | 0 |
| 62 | MF | (Thailand) Airfan Doloh | 0 | 0 | 0 | 0 | 0 | 0 | 0 | 0 | 0 | 0 | 0 | 0 |
| 85 | GK | (Thailand) Issarapong Waewdee | 0 | 0 | 0 | 0 | 0 | 0 | 0 | 0 | 0 | 0 | 0 | 0 |
| 91 | FW | (Singapore) (South Africa) Ilhan Fandi | 0 | 0 | 0 | 0 | 0 | 0 | 0 | 0 | 0 | 0 | 0 | 0 |
Players who have played this season and/or sign for the season but had left the club permanently
| 1 | GK | (Bosnia and Herzegovina) Slaviša Bogdanović | 0 | 0 | 0 | 0 | 0 | 0 | 5 | 0 | 2 | 0 | 7 | 0 |
| 10 | MF | (Argentina) Joel López Pissano | 4+4 | 0 | 1 | 1 | 0 | 0 | 4+1 | 0 | 1 | 0 | 15 | 1 |
| 15 | DF | (Montenegro) Miloš Drinčić | 9+1 | 0 | 0 | 0 | 0 | 0 | 3 | 0 | 2 | 0 | 15 | 0 |
| 21 | MF | (Thailand) Sivakorn Tiatrakul | 2+3 | 0 | 1 | 0 | 0 | 0 | 0+2 | 0 | 0+1 | 0 | 9 | 0 |
| 23 | DF | (Singapore) (Nigeria) Jordan Emaviwe | 0+7 | 0 | 1 | 0 | 0 | 0 | 4+1 | 1 | 0 | 0 | 13 | 1 |
| 55 | DF | (Thailand) Chanon Thamma | 3+3 | 0 | 1 | 0 | 0+1 | 0 | 1 | 0 | 0+2 | 0 | 11 | 0 |
| 69 | DF | (France) (Niger) Seydine N'Diaye | 7+1 | 2 | 0 | 0 | 0 | 0 | 3 | 0 | 0+1 | 0 | 12 | 2 |

== Competitions ==
=== Thai League 1 ===
==== Matches ====
Win Draw Loss

| 16 August 2025 1 | PT Prachuap | 2–2 | BG Pathum United | Prachuap Khiri Khan |
| | Nick Taylor 15'; Phon-Ek Jensen 53'; Airton Tirabassi (yellow card) 56'; Saharat Kanyaroj (yellow card) 66'; Kanarin Thawornsak (yellow card) 78'; Iklas Sanron (yellow card) 81' | | Seydine N'Diaye 55'; Gakuto Notsuda 90+3' (pen.); Matheus Fornazari (yellow card) 74' | Stadium: Sam Ao Stadium; Attendance: 3,650; Referee: Phairot Bunkamnoed |

| 23 August 2025 2 | BG Pathum United | 2–1 | Lamphun Warriors | Pathum Thani |
| | Matheus Fornazari 77', 87' | | Mohammed Osman 25'; Maung Maung Lwin (yellow card) 15'; Charlie Clough (yellow card) 55' | Stadium: True BG Stadium; Attendance: 7,478; Referee: Sivakorn Pu-udom |

| 30 August 2025 3 | Bangkok United | 2–1 | BG Pathum United | Pathum Thani |
| | Pokklaw Anan 88'; Ilias Alhaft 90' | | Ekanit Panya 65' | Stadium: Thammasat Stadium (Note: Match switch to Thammasat Stadium due to refurbishment of True BG Stadium); Attendance: 4,097; Referee: Torphong Somsing |

| 12 September 2025 4 | Uthai Thani | 0–1 | BG Pathum United | Uthai Thani |
| | Chigozie Mbah (yellow card) 38'; Harhys Stewart (yellow card) 40' | | Tomoyuki Doi 64'; Saranon Anuin (yellow card) 77'; Jordan Emaviwe (yellow card) 80' | Stadium: Uthai Thani Province Stadium; Attendance: 3,174; Referee: Natee Choosuwan |

| 21 September 2025 5 | Chiangrai United | 1–0 | BG Pathum United | Chiangrai |
| | Carlos Iury 16' (yellow card) 84'; Apirak Woravong (yellow card) 90+4' | | Miloš Drinčić (yellow card) 33'; Gakuto Notsuda (yellow card) 83' | Stadium: Singha Chiangrai Stadium; Attendance: 11,564; Referee: Panumas Phansamo |

| 28 September 2025 6 | BG Pathum United | 2–0 | Port | Pathum Thani |
| | Surachart Sareepim 45+2', 58' (yellow card) 29'; Waris Choolthong (yellow card) 32'; Nika Sandokhadze (yellow card) 90+2' | | Asnawi Mangkualam (yellow card) 19'; Brayan Perea (penalty missed) 33; Rebin Sulaka (yellow card) 43'; Kaká Mendes (yellow card) 60'; Teerasak Poeiphimai (yellow card) 75' | Stadium: True BG Stadium; Attendance: 11,158; Referee: Sivakorn Pu-udom |

| 5 October 2025 7 | Buriram United | 2–2 | BG Pathum United | Buriram |
| | Guilherme Bissoli 31', 45+3' (pen.); Peter Žulj (yellow card) 26'; Sandy Walsh (yellow card) 58' | | Seydine N'Diaye 25'; Sanchai Nontasila 33'; Chatmongkol Thongkiri (yellow card) 18'; Joel López Pissano (yellow card) 76' | Stadium: Chang Arena; Attendance: 28,051; Referee: Torpong Somsing |

| 18 October 2025 8 | BG Pathum United | 1–0 | Ayutthaya United | Pathum Thani |
| | Ekanit Panya 15'; Kritsada Kaman (yellow card) 82' | | Kittichai Yaidee (yellow card) 69'; Chakkit Laptrakul (yellow card) 90+7' | Stadium: True BG Stadium; Attendance: 8,696; Referee: Natee Choosuwan |

| 26 October 2025 9 | Sukhothai | 3–1 | BG Pathum United | Sukhothai |
| | Elias 2', 90+4'; Ratchanat Aranpiroj 77' (yellow card) 70'; Thiti Thumporn (yellow card) 35'; Chaiyaphon Otton (yellow card) 90' | | Tomoyuki Doi 13' (yellow card) 27'; Ekanit Panya (yellow card) 63'; Chanathip Songkrasin (red card) 90+3' | Stadium: Thalay Luang Stadium; Attendance: 3,538; Referee: Chaireag Ngam-som |

| 2 November 2025 10 | Chonburi | 1–2 | BG Pathum United | Chonburi |
| | Jonathan Bolingi 29' (pen.); Jorge Fellipe (yellow card) 56' | | Tomoyuki Doi 53', 63' (pen.); Miloš Drinčić (yellow card) 27'; Warinthon Jamnongwat (yellow card) 46'; Chanon Tamma (yellow card) 90+11' | Stadium: Chonburi Stadium; Attendance: 6,501; Referee: Panumas Phansamo |

| 9 November 2025 11 | BG Pathum United | 1–1 | Rayong | Pathum Thani |
| | Nika Sandokhadze 38'; Chanapach Buaphan (yellow card) 70'; Tomoyuki Doi (yellow card) 90+10' | | Saharat Sontisawat 59'; Wasusiwakit Phusirit (yellow card) 50'; Supawit Romphopak (yellow card) 90+7'; João Afonso (yellow card) 90+10' | Stadium: True BG Stadium; Attendance: 8,171; Referee: Torphong Somsing |

| 22 November 2025 12 | Ratchaburi | 0–0 | BG Pathum United | Ratchaburi |
| | Jonathan Khemdee (yellow card) 27'; Thossawat Limwannasathian (yellow card) 88' | | Ekanit Panya (yellow card) 45+4'; Nika Sandokhadze (yellow card) 56'; Sanchai Nonthasila (yellow card) 65' | Stadium: Ratchaburi Stadium; Attendance: 6,947; Referee: Panumas Phansamo |

| 24 December 2025 13 (Rescheduled) | BG Pathum United | 2–1 | Kanchanaburi Power | Pathum Thani |
| | Tomoyuki Doi 23'; Ekanit Panya 73'; Kritsada Kaman (yellow card) 22'; Chatmongkol Thongkiri (yellow card) 38' | | Diego Bardanca 53'; Mohamed Mara (yellow card) 44'; Mehdi Tahrat (yellow card) 45'; Chenrop Samphaodi (yellow card) 81'; Kittipong Phoothawchuek (yellow card) 82'; Santipap Ratniyorm (yellow card) 90'; Pongpat Liorungrueangkit (red card) 90+8' | Stadium: True BG Stadium; Attendance: 6,592; Referee: Noppadet Mangngam |

| 7 December 2025 14 | Nakhon Ratchasima | 0–1 | BG Pathum United | Nakhon Ratchasima |
| | Dennis Murillo (yellow card) 56' | | Tomoyuki Doi 78'; Nika Sandokhadze (yellow card) 72'; Saranon Anuin (yellow card) 90' | Stadium: 80th Birthday Stadium; Attendance: 2,398; Referee: Sila Jinnigorn |

| 14 December 2025 15 | BG Pathum United | 3–0 | Muangthong United | Pathum Thani |
| | Chanathip Songkrasin 20'; Tomoyuki Doi 40', 65' (yellow card) 39'; Kritsada Kaman (yellow card) 15' | | | Stadium: True BG Stadium; Attendance: 10,130; Referee: Peerasan Krataithong |

| 10 January 2026 16 | Lamphun Warriors | 1–1 | BG Pathum United | Lamphun |
| | Kenshiro Daniels 87'; Nuttee Noiwilai (yellow card) 56'; Tawan Khotsupho (yellow card) 90' | | Ikhsan Fandi 31'; Yoshiaki Takagi (yellow card) 12'; Sarach Yooyen (yellow card) 68' | Stadium: Lamphun Province Stadium; Attendance: 2,345; Referee: Panumas Phansamo |

| 18 January 2026 17 | BG Pathum United | 0–1 | Bangkok United | Pathum Thani |
| | Warinthon Jamnongwat (red card) 28'; Waris Choolthong (red card) 43'; Chatmongkol Thongkiri (yellow card) 82' | | Ilias Alhaft 54' (yellow card) 70'; Wanchai Jarunongkran (yellow card) 45'; Pratama Arhan (yellow card) 68' | Stadium: True BG Stadium; Attendance: 9,307; Referee: Songkran Bunmeekiart |

| 25 January 2026 18 | BG Pathum United | 4–0 | Uthai Thani | Pathum Thani |
| | Yoshiaki Takagi 6'; Nika Sandokhadze 13', 86' (yellow card) 79'; Ikhsan Fandi 24' | | Christian Gomis (yellow card) 31' | Stadium: True BG Stadium; Attendance: 6,848; Referee: Torpong Somsing |

| 31 January 2026 19 | BG Pathum United | 2–2 | Chiangrai United | Pathum Thani |
| | Ikhsan Fandi 45+2' (pen.); Elias Dolah 75'; Surachart Sareepim (yellow card) 32' | | Dudu Silva 50'; Carlos Iury 85' (pen.) | Stadium: True BG Stadium; Attendance: 6,599; Referee: Chaikrit Inboonsong |

| 19 April 2026 20 (Rescheduled) | Port | 0–0 | BG Pathum United | Bangkok |
| | | | | Stadium: PAT Stadium; Attendance: 6,250; Referee: Wiwat Jumpaoon |

| 14 February 2026 21 | BG Pathum United | 1–3 | Buriram United | Pathum Thani |
| | Raniel 32'; Sanchai Nonthasila (yellow card) 80' | | Guilherme Bissoli 4'; Suphanat Mueanta 36'; Supachai Chaided 76' (yellow card) 80'; Neil Etheridge (yellow card) 85' | Stadium: True BG Stadium; Attendance: 13,094; Referee: Wiwat Jumpaoon |

| 22 February 2026 22 | Ayutthaya United | 0–2 | BG Pathum United | Ayutthaya |
| | Nattapon Worasut (yellow card) 11' (yellow-red card) 19'; Passakorn Biaothungnoi (yellow card) 72' | | Kritsada Kaman 49'; Tomoyuki Doi 63' (yellow card) 82'; Ekanit Panya (yellow card) 29'; Waris Choolthong (yellow card) 47'; Elias Dolah (yellow card) 57' | Stadium: Ayutthaya Province Stadium; Attendance: 4,129; Referee: Panumas Phansamo |

| 1 March 2026 23 | BG Pathum United | 2–1 | Sukhothai | Pathum Thani |
| | Ikhsan Fandi 6', 24'; Surachart Sareepim (yellow card) 52'; Sarach Yooyen (yellow card) 85' | | Chaiyaphon Otton 45+3'; Cláudio (yellow card) 50'; Thiti Thumporn (yellow card) 90+5' | Stadium: True BG Stadium; Attendance: 6,165; Referee: Komgrit Ponpasit |

| 8 March 2026 24 | BG Pathum United | 2–3 | Chonburi | Pathum Thani |
| | Rainel 19'; Ekanit Panya 90+3' (yellow card) 49'; Kritsada Kaman (yellow card) 15'; Tomoyuki Doi (yellow card) 71'; Sanchai Nonthasila (yellow card) 86' | | Jefferson Tabinas 33'; Channarong Promsrikaew 57'; Santipharp Chan-ngom 75'; Jonathan Bolingi (yellow card) 24'; Kike Linares (yellow card) 37'; Thanaset Sujarit (yellow card) 87' | Stadium: True BG Stadium; Attendance: 8,338; Referee: Songkran Bunmeekiart |

| 14 March 2026 25 | Rayong | 1–1 | BG Pathum United | Rayong |
| | Anon Amornlerdsak 49'; João Afonso (yellow card) 64'; Saharat Sontisawat (yellow card) 82'; Peerapat Kaminthong (yellow card) 82' | | Rainel 21'; Yoshiaki Takagi (yellow card) 34'; Chanathip Songkrasin (yellow card) 90' | Stadium: Rayong Province Stadium; Attendance: 4,003; Referee: Veeraporn Maophaeo |

| 22 March 2026 26 | BG Pathum United | 2–2 | Ratchaburi | Pathum Thani |
| | Nika Sandokhadze 42' (yellow card) 90+2'; Tomoyuki Doi 60'; Yoshiaki Takagi (yellow card) 68'; Raniel (yellow card) 75'; Kritsada Kaman (yellow card) 90+1' | | Gleyson Oliveira 8'; Denilson 27' (yellow card) 45'; Negueba (yellow card) 71'; Jonathan Khemdee (yellow card) 90+1' | Stadium: True BG Stadium; Attendance: 8,070; Referee: Mongkolchai Pechsri |

| 4 April 2026 27 | Kanchanaburi Power | 0–2 | BG Pathum United | Kanchanaburi |
| | Aboubakar Kamara (yellow card) 32'; Ewerton (yellow card) 45+7' (yellow-red card) 63'; Diego Bardanca (yellow card) 65'; Sergio Aguero (yellow card) 89' | | Patrik Gustavsson 23'; Elias Dolah 70' (yellow card) 77'; Thanawat Pimyotha (yellow card) 80' | Stadium: Kanchanaburi Province Stadium; Attendance: 7,549; Referee: Kotchapoom Meesridaecha |

| 24 April 2026 28 (Rescheduled) | BG Pathum United | 1–0 | Nakhon Ratchasima | Pathum Thani |
| | Patrik Gustavsson 83' | | Pongsakron Hanrattana (yellow card) 46'; Sarawut Inpan (yellow card) 80' | Stadium: True BG Stadium; Attendance: 8,176; Referee: Komgrit Ponpasit |

| 1 May 2026 29 | Muangthong United | 1–1 | BG Pathum United | Nonthaburi |
| | Kakana Khamyok 64'; Siradanai Phosri (yellow card) 72'; Michael Kempter (yellow card) 90+2' | | Surachat Sareepim 21' (yellow card) 50'; Gakuto Notsuda (yellow card) 60'; Waris Choolthong (yellow card) 78' | Stadium: Thunderdome Stadium; Attendance: 11,413; Referee: Noppadet Mangngam |

| 10 May 2026 30 | BG Pathum United | 3–0 | PT Prachuap | Pathum Thani |
| | Tomoyuki Doi 1'; Sanchai Nontasila 45+5'; Itthimon Tippanet 90+5'; Kritsada Kaman (yellow card) 26'; Riku Matsuda (yellow card) 28' | | Oussama Thiangkham (yellow card) 45+4'; Jittiphat Wasungnoen (yellow card) 51' | Stadium: True BG Stadium; Referee: Panumas Phansamo |

| Pos | Team | Pld | W | D | L | GF | GA | GD | Pts | Qualification or relegation |
|---|---|---|---|---|---|---|---|---|---|---|
| 2 | Port | 30 | 18 | 6 | 6 | 59 | 23 | +36 | 60 | Qualification to the AFC Champions League Elite League stage and ASEAN Club Championship group stage |
| 3 | Ratchaburi | 30 | 18 | 5 | 7 | 55 | 30 | +25 | 59 | Qualification to the AFC Champions League Elite League stage and ASEAN Club Championship group stage |
| 4 | BG Pathum United | 30 | 14 | 10 | 6 | 45 | 29 | +16 | 52 | Qualification for AFC Champions League Two group stage |
| 5 | Bangkok United | 30 | 13 | 11 | 6 | 43 | 32 | +11 | 50 | |
| 6 | PT Prachuap | 30 | 11 | 12 | 7 | 39 | 37 | +2 | 45 | |

Source: Thai League 1 2025–26
Rules for classification: 1) Points; 2) Goal difference; 3) Goals scored.

=== Thai FA Cup ===
Win Draw Loss

| 29 October 2025 Rd of 64 | BG Pathum United | 4–0 | Kamphaengphet (T3) | Pathum Thani |
| | Matheus Fornazari 3', 50'; Joel López Pissano 59'; Chanathip Songkrasin 84' | | | Stadium: True BG Stadium; Attendance: 5,092; Referee: Kitisak Pikunngoen |

| 21 December 2025 Rd of 32 | BG Pathum United | 10–0 | Ubon Kids City FC (Semi-Pro) | Pathum Thani |
| | Sanchai Nonthasila 5', 40'; Matheus Fornazari 18', 51'; Chatmongkol Thongkiri 55'; Thiraphat Puethong 65'; Surachart Sareepim 71', 88'; Itthimon Tippanet 85'; Siwakorn Ponsan 90' | | | Stadium: True BG Stadium; Attendance: 5,423; Referee: Alongkorn Khonwai |

| 14 January 2026 Rd of 16 | PT Prachuap | 1–0 | BG Pathum United | Prachuap Khiri Khan |
| | Michel 73' (yellow card) 58' | | Riku Matsuda (yellow card) 58' | Stadium: Sam Ao Stadium; Attendance: 2,570; Referee: Satchukorn Saenchu |

=== Thai League Cup ===
| 28 December 2025 Rd of 32 | (T3) Uttaradit | 0–4 | BG Pathum United | Uttaradit |
| | Matheus Fornazari 8' (pen.), 22'; Surachart Sareepim 83'; Pongrawit Jantawong 90+4'; Warinthon Jamnongwat (yellow card) 50'; Takaki Ose (yellow card) 51' | | | Stadium: Uttaradit Province Stadium; Attendance: 1,656; Referee: Veeraporn Maophaeo |

| 21 January 2026 Rd of 16 | Muangthong United | 0–2 | BG Pathum United | Nonthaburi |
| | Melvyn Lorenzen (yellow card) 70' | | Ikhsan Fandi 33', 45' | Stadium: Thunderdome Stadium; Attendance: 3,128; Referee: Chaikrit Inboonsong |

| 18 March 2026 Quarter Final | BG Pathum United | 3–0 | Mahasarakham SBT (T2) | Thanyaburi, Pathum Thani |
| | Ikhsan Fandi 45+5', 90+1'; Yoshiaki Takagi 70'; Gakuto Notsuda (yellow card) 64'; Natthaphon Piamplai (yellow card) 90+3' | | Jakkit Palapon (yellow card) 11'; Natthaphon Piamplai (yellow card) 90+3' | Stadium: True BG Stadium; Attendance: 5,058; Referee: Noppadet Mangngam |

| 8 April 2026 Semi Final | Buriram United | 0–1 | BG Pathum United | Chonburi |
| | Pansa Hemviboon (yellow card) 39'; Peter Žulj (yellow card) 76' | | Surachart Sareepim 49' (yellow card) 40'; Warinthon Jamnongwat (yellow card) 43'; Ekanit Panya (yellow card) 86' | Stadium: Chonburi Stadium; Attendance: 5,237; Referee: Torphong Somsing |

| 24 May 2026 Final | BG Pathum United | 0–1 | Port | Pathum Thani |
| | Gakuto Notsuda (yellow card) 54' | | Lucas Tocantins 29'; Peeradol Chamratsamee (yellow card) 45'; Sivakorn Tiatrakul (yellow card) 51'; Brayan Perea (yellow card) 82'; Matheus Lins (yellow card) 85'; Rebin Sulaka (yellow card) 90+6' | Stadium: Thammasat Stadium; Referee: Torphong Somsing |

=== AFC Champions League Two ===
| Pos | Team | Pld | W | D | L | GF | GA | GD | Pts | Qualification | BGT | PHS | BGP | KAY |
|---|---|---|---|---|---|---|---|---|---|---|---|---|---|---|
| 1 | (Singapore) Tampines Rovers | 6 | 5 | 1 | 0 | 14 | 5 | +9 | 16 | Advance to round of 16 | — | 1–0 | 2–1 | 5–3 |
| 2 | (South Korea) Pohang Steelers | 6 | 4 | 1 | 1 | 7 | 2 | +5 | 13 | Advance to round of 16 | 1–1 | — | 2–0 | 2–0 |
| 3 | (Thailand) BG Pathum United | 6 | 2 | 0 | 4 | 5 | 8 | −3 | 6 | | 0–2 | 0–1 | — | 2–1 |
| 4 | (Philippines) Kaya–Iloilo | 6 | 0 | 0 | 6 | 4 | 15 | −11 | 0 | | 0–3 | 0–1 | 0–2 | — |

Source: ACL2
Rules for classification: Tiebreakers

| 18 September 2025 1 | BG Pathum United (Thailand) | 0–1 | (South Korea) Pohang Steelers | Pathum Thani, Thailand |
| | Surachat Sareepim (yellow card) 60' | Report | Lee Dong-hyeop 41'; Jonathan Aspropotamitis (yellow card) 21' | Stadium: True BG Stadium; Attendance: 5,185; Referee: Ahmed Eisa Darwish (United Arab Emirates) |

| 2 October 2025 2 | BG Tampines Rovers (Singapore) | 2–1 | (Thailand) BG Pathum United | Bishan, Singapore |
| | Trent Buhagiar 42'; Hide Higashikawa 58'; Tallo Ngao (yellow card) 75'; Joel Chew (yellow card) 89' | Report | Sanchai Nontasila (yellow card) 56' | Stadium: Bishan Stadium; Attendance: 699; Referee: Bijan Heydari (Iran) |

| 23 October 2025 3 | Kaya–Iloilo (Philippines) | 0–2 | (Thailand) BG Pathum United | Capas, Philippines |
| | Marco Casambre (yellow card) 15'; Sherwin Basindanan (yellow card) 85' | Report | Jordan Emaviwe 10'; Tomoyuki Doi 70' | Stadium: New Clark City Athletics Stadium; Attendance: 422; Referee: Thoriq Alkatiri (Indonesia) |

| 6 November 2025 4 | BG Pathum United (Thailand) | 2–1 | (Philippines) Kaya–Iloilo | Pathum Thani, Thailand |
| | Matheus Fornazari 9', 34' | Report | Kenshiro Daniels 15'; Sherwin Basindanan (yellow card) 78'; Simone Rota (yellow card) 90' | Stadium: True BG Stadium; Attendance: 5,162; Referee: Mohamed Khaled (Bahrain) |

| 27 November 2025 5 | Pohang Steelers (South Korea) | 2–0 | (Thailand) BG Pathum United | Pohang, South Korea |
| | Lee Ho-jae 43', 54'; Shin Kwang-Hoon (yellow card) 25'; Jorge Luiz (yellow card) 37'; Park Seung-Wook (yellow card) 80'; Cho Sang-Hyeok (yellow card) 86' | Report | | Stadium: Pohang Steel Yard; Attendance: 3,027; Referee: Payam Heydari (Iran) |

| 11 December 2025 6 | BG Pathum United (Thailand) | 0–2 | (Singapore) BG Tampines Rovers | Pathum Thani, Thailand |
| | Sarach Yooyen (yellow card) 73' | Report | Koya Kazama 78'; Trent Buhagiar 85'; Glenn Kweh (yellow card) 72' | Stadium: True BG Stadium; Referee: Yahya Al-Mulla (United Arab Emirates) |

=== ASEAN Club Championship ===
==== Group stage ====
| Pos | Team | Pld | W | D | L | GF | GA | GD | Pts | Qualification | BRU | SEL | BGP | CAH | BGT | DHC |
|---|---|---|---|---|---|---|---|---|---|---|---|---|---|---|---|---|
| 1 | (Thailand) Buriram United | 5 | 2 | 3 | 0 | 14 | 5 | +9 | 9 | Advance to knockout stage | — | 1–1 | — | 1–1 | — | 6–0 |
| 2 | (Malaysia) Selangor | 5 | 2 | 3 | 0 | 9 | 5 | +4 | 9 | Advance to knockout stage | — | — | 1–1 | 2–0 | 4–2 | — |
| 3 | (Thailand) BG Pathum United | 5 | 2 | 2 | 1 | 9 | 7 | +2 | 8 | | 2–2 | — | — | 2–1 | — | 2–0 |
| 4 | (Vietnam) Công An Hà Nội | 5 | 2 | 1 | 2 | 9 | 6 | +3 | 7 | | — | — | — | — | 6–1 | 1–0 |
| 5 | (Singapore) Tampines Rovers | 5 | 2 | 0 | 3 | 10 | 17 | −7 | 6 | | 1–4 | — | 3–2 | — | — | — |
| 6 | (Philippines) Dynamic Herb Cebu | 5 | 0 | 1 | 4 | 2 | 13 | −11 | 1 | | — | 1–1 | — | — | 1–3 | — |

Source: ASEAN United FC
Rules for classification: Tiebreakers

| 20 August 2025 1 | BG Pathum United (Thailand) | 2–1 | (Vietnam) Công An Hà Nội | Pathum Thani, Thailand |
| | Chanathip Songkrasin 58', 90+7'; Matheus Fornazari (red card) 43'; Waris Choolthong (yellow card) 77'; Pongrawit Jantawong (yellow card) 90+2' | Report | Alan 20'; Lê Phạm Thành Long (yellow card) 7' | Stadium: True BG Stadium; Attendance: 5,529; Referee: Asker Nadjafaliev (Uzbekistan); Man of the Match: (Thailand) Chanathip Songkrasin |

| 24 September 2025 2 | BG Pathum United (Thailand) | 2–2 | (Thailand) Buriram United | Pathum Thani, Thailand |
| | Chanathip Songkrasin 23'; Surachat Sareepim 45+3' (yellow card) 10'; Chatmongkol Thongkiri (yellow card) 37'; Chanon Thamma (yellow card) 90+3' | Report | Sasalak Haiprakhon 20'; Guilherme Bissoli 35' (pen.); Ko Myeong-seok (yellow card) 26'; Filip Stojković (yellow card) 39' | Stadium: True BG Stadium; Attendance: 9,781; Referee: Sami Taher Al Ismail (Saudi Arabia) |

| 3 December 2025 3 | BG Tampines Rovers (Singapore) | 3–2 | (Thailand) BG Pathum United | Jalan Besar, Singapore |
| | Hide Higashikawa 45+3', 61', 78'; Shah Shairan (penalty missed) 11; Irfan Najeeb (yellow card) 30' | Report | Tomoyuki Doi 7'; Raniel 27'; Sarach Yooyen (yellow card) 66'; Ekanit Panya (yellow card) 77' | Stadium: Jalan Besar Stadium; Attendance: 1,009; Referee: Ahmed Al-Ali (Jordan) |

| 28 January 2026 4 | BG Pathum United (Thailand) | 2–0 | (Philippines) DH Cebu | Pathum Thani, Thailand |
| | Kritsada Kaman 56'; Ikhsan Fandi 78'; Nika Sandokhadze (yellow card) 12'; Siwakorn Phonsan (yellow card) 36'; Waris Choolthong (yellow card) 74' | Report | | Stadium: True BG Stadium; Attendance: 4,831; Referee: Qasim Matar Al-Hatmi (Oman) |

| 4 February 2026 5 | Selangor (Malaysia) | 1–1 | (Thailand) BG Pathum United | Shah Alam, Malaysia |
| | Faisal Halim 36'; Alvin Fortes (red card) 25' | Report | Richmond Ankrah 63' (o.g.) | Stadium: Shah Alam Stadium; Referee: Sami Taher Al Ismail (Saudi Arabia) |
