= Teerapat Pruetong =

Thai footballer

Personal information
- Full name: Teerapat Pruetong
- Date of birth: 17 February 2007 (age 19)
- Place of birth: Ubon Ratchathani, Thailand
- Height: 1.75 m (5 ft 9 in)
- Positions: Winger; attacking midfielder

Team information
- Current team: Hokkaido Consadole Sapporo (on loan from BG Pathum United)
- Number: 19

Youth career
- 2016–2018: PTT Rayong
- 2019–2022: Assumption College Sriracha
- 2023–2024: BG Pathum United

Senior career*
Years	Team	Apps	(Gls)
2024–	BG Pathum United	9	(1)
2026–	→ Hokkaido Consadole Sapporo (loan)	17	(1)

International career^{‡}
2023	Thailand U17	4	(0)
2025–	Thailand U23	9	(0)
2026–	Thailand	3	(0)
Medal record
Men's football
Representing Thailand
FIFA ASEAN Cup
Runner-up	2026 Indonesia	Team
- * Club domestic league appearances and goals as of 01:33, 6 October 2026 (UTC) ‡ National team caps and goals as of 2 October 2026

Teerapat Pruetong (Thai: ธีรภัทร ปรือทอง; born 17 February 2007) is a Thai professional footballer who plays as a winger or attacking midfielder for Japanese club Hokkaido Consadole Sapporo, on loan from BG Pathum United, and the Thailand national team.

== Club career ==
=== BG Pathum United ===
Teerapat was born in Ubon Ratchathani, Thailand. His youth career included PTT Rayong, Assumption College Sriracha and the youth system of BG Pathum United.

In January 2025, BG Pathum United promoted Teerapat to the first team. He made his Thai League 1 debut on 22 February 2025, coming on as a stoppage-time substitute for Chanathip Songkrasin in a 1–0 win over PT Prachuap. On 8 March 2025, he scored his first Thai League 1 goal for BG Pathum United as a substitute in a 4–1 away win over Nakhon Pathom United.

In September 2025, BG Pathum United sent Teerapat to England for a trial with Burnley's academy during the FIFA international window.

=== Hokkaido Consadole Sapporo ===
In December 2024, Teerapat was selected as one of the outstanding players in Consadole Attacker Search powered by Mizuno, a talent-identification project held in Bangkok by Hokkaido Consadole Sapporo. He later trained with the club in June 2025.

On 28 January 2026, Hokkaido Consadole Sapporo announced that Teerapat would join the club on loan from BG Pathum United. The loan was initially scheduled to run from 1 February to 30 June 2026, and he was assigned the number 19 shirt.

On 21 March 2026, Teerapat made his first start for Consadole and assisted Shuma Kido's winning goal in a 1–0 win over Ventforet Kofu. On 9 May 2026, he scored his first goal in Japan in a J2/J3 100 Year Vision League match, netting Consadole's second goal in the 39th minute of a 4–3 win over RB Omiya Ardija.

In May 2026, BG Pathum United extended Teerapat's loan to Hokkaido Consadole Sapporo for the 2026–27 season. By that time, he had made 10 appearances for the club, scoring once and providing four assists.

== International career ==
Teerapat has represented Thailand at under-17 and under-23 levels. He was named in Thailand's squad for the 2026 AFC U-23 Asian Cup in Saudi Arabia. In May 2026, he received his first call-up to the senior national team for friendly matches against Kuwait and China during the June FIFA international window.

== Career statistics ==
=== Club ===
As of match played 13 September 2026

Appearances and goals by club, season and competition
Club	Season	League			National cup		League Cup		Continental		Other		Total	
Club	Season	Division	Apps	Goals	Apps	Goals	Apps	Goals	Apps	Goals	Apps	Goals	Apps	Goals
BG Pathum United	2024–25	Thai League 1	6	1	3	1	1	0	—		7 (Note: One appearance in ASEAN Club Championship, six appearances in Singapore Cup)	0	17	2
BG Pathum United	2025–26	Thai League 1	3	0	2	1	—		1 (Note: Appearance in AFC Champions League Two)	0	1 (Note: Appearance in ASEAN Club Championship)	0	6	1
BG Pathum United	Total		9	1	5	2	1	0	1	0	8	0	23	3
Hokkaido Consadole Sapporo (loan)	2026	J2/J3 League	11	1	—		—		—		—		11	1
Hokkaido Consadole Sapporo (loan)	2026–27	J2 League	6	0	0	0	1	0	—		—		7	0
Hokkaido Consadole Sapporo (loan)	Total		17	1	0	0	1	0	—		—		18	1
Career total			26	2	5	2	2	0	1	0	8	0	41	4

=== International ===
As of match played 2 October 2026

Appearances and goals by national team and year
National team	Year	Apps	Goals
Thailand	2026	3	0
Total		3	0

== Honours ==
Thailand

- FIFA ASEAN Cup runner-up: 2026
- King's Cup: 2026
