= Charalampos Charalampous (footballer, born 1999) =

Cypriot footballer (born 1999)

Personal information
- Date of birth: 1 July 1999 (age 27)
- Place of birth: Limassol, Cyprus
- Height: 1.77 m (5 ft 10 in)
- Positions: Defender; midfielder

Team information
- Current team: Nakhon Ratchasima FC (on loan from Uthai Thani FC)
- Number: 33

Youth career
- Aris Limassol FC

Senior career*
Years	Team	Apps	(Gls)
2018–2022	Aris Limassol FC	1	(0)
2021–2022	→ Ermis Aradippou FC (loan)	2	(0)
2022–2023	Krasava ENY Ypsonas FC	25	(0)
2023–2024	Uthai Thani FC	26	(0)
2024	Buriram United FC	1	(0)
2025–	Uthai Thani FC	21	(0)
2026–	→ Nakhon Ratchasima FC (loan)	4	(0)
- * Club domestic league appearances and goals as of 11 April 2026

Charalampos Charalampous (Thai: ชาราลัมโบส ชาราลัมบูส; Greek: Χαράλαμπος Χαραλάμπους; born 1 July 1999) is a Cypriot professional footballer who plays as a defender or midfielder for Nakhon Ratchasima FC on loan from Uthai Thani FC.

== Early life ==
Charalampous was born on 1 July 1999. Born in Limassol, Cyprus, he was born to a Thai mother and a Cypriot father.

== Career ==
As a youth player, Charalampous joined the youth academy of Cypriot side Aris Limassol FC and was promoted to the club's senior team in 2018, where he made one league appearance and scored zero goals. Following his stint there, he signed for Cypriot side Krasava ENY Ypsonas FC, where he made twenty-five league appearances and scored zero goals. One year later, he signed for Thai side Uthai Thani FC, where he made twenty-six league appearances and scored zero goals. Thai news website Ballthai wrote in 2024 that he "was a key player in helping Uthai Thani FC finish 7th in the 2023–24 Thai League 1 standings" while playing for the club.

Ahead of the 2024–25 season, he signed for Thai side Buriram United FC, where he made one league appearance and scored zero goals and helped the club win the league title, before returning to Thai side Uthai Thani FC six months later. Subsequently, he was sent on loan to Thai side Nakhon Ratchasima FC.
