= Seydine N'Diaye =

Senegalese footballer (born 1998)

Personal information
- Full name: Seydine Mohamadou N'Diaye
- Date of birth: 23 April 1998 (age 28)
- Place of birth: Dakar, Senegal
- Height: 2.05 m (6 ft 9 in)
- Position: Centre-back

Youth career
- –2018: Vaulx-en-Velin

Senior career*
Years	Team	Apps	(Gls)
2018	Vaulx-en-Velin	4	(0)
2018–2019	Chaux-de-Fonds	11	(0)
2019–2020	Vaulx-en-Velin	7	(1)
2020–2021	Lyon La Duchère	6	(2)
2020–2021	Lyon La Duchère B	5	(1)
2021–2022	Göztepe	0	(0)
2021–2022	→ Dordrecht (loan)	22	(3)
2022–2023	Sporting da Covilhã	12	(0)
2023-2024	Ilves	21	(1)
2024–2025	BG Pathum United	18	(3)
2025	Ratchaburi	0	(0)
- * Club domestic league appearances and goals as of 6 January 2026

Seydine Mohamadou N'Diaye (born 23 April 1998) is a Senegalese professional footballer who plays as a centre-back.

== Club career ==
N'Diaye attended school at Edgar Quinet, then College Jean JauJaures for primary school, and Lycee Lacassagne for high school.

N'Diaye began his professional football career in France, playing for Championnat National 3 side Vaulx-en-Velin. He made his senior debut for them in a 4–2 away victory over Chamalières.

N'Diaye then moved to Swiss club Chaux-de-Fonds on a free transfer, but only stayed for a season before returning to his former club. He scored his first goal in senior football on his return to Vaulx-en-Velin in a 2–1 away defeat to Montluçon. N'Diaye then moved to Lyon La Duchère on a free transfer, and scored three goals including a spell in the reserve side.

On 6 August 2021, Göztepe announced the signing of N'Diaye, and a day later loaned him out to Dutch side FC Dordrecht. He made his debut in professional football, playing the full 90 minutes in a 2–1 away win against Jong Ajax. N'Diaye scored his first goal in professional football in a 2–2 home draw against Jong FC Utrecht, in which he also registered an assist.

On 9 July 2022, N'Diaye signed for Portuguese side Sporting da Covilhã on a free transfer.

On 24 March 2023, N'Diaye signed with Ilves in Finland for the 2023 season, with the club option for 2024. He left the club after the 2023 season.

On 1 January 2024, N'Diaye signed with BG Pathum United of the Thai League 1 on a free transfer.

== Career statistics ==
As of 6 January 2025

Appearances and goals by club, season and competition
Club	Season	League			Cup (Note: Includes Turkish Cup, KNVB Cup, Taça de Portugal, Suomen Cup and Thai FA Cup)		League cup (Note: Includes Taça da Liga, Finnish League Cup and Thai League Cup)		Continental		Total	
Club	Season	Division	Apps	Goals	Apps	Goals	Apps	Goals	Apps	Goals	Apps	Goals
Vaulx-en-Velin	2017–18	National 3	4	0	–		–		–		4	0
Chaux-de-Fonds	2018–19	Swiss Promotion League	11	0	–		–		–		11	0
Vaulx-en-Velin	2019–20	National 3	7	1	–		–		–		7	1
Lyon La Duchère	2020–21	National	6	2	–		–		–		6	2
Lyon La Duchère B	2020–21	National 3	5	1	–		–		–		5	1
Göztepe	2021–22	Süper Lig	0	0	0	0	–		–		0	0
Dordrecth (loan)	2021–22	Eerste Divisie	22	3	0	0	–		–		22	3
Sporting da Covilhã	2022–23	Liga Portugal 2	12	0	1	0	2	0	–		15	0
Ilves	2023	Veikkausliiga	21	1	6	0	0	0	–		27	6
BG Pathum United	2023–24	Thai League 1	6	1	0	0	1	0	–		7	1
BG Pathum United	2024–25	Thai League 1	4	0	1	0	1	0	1 (Note: Appearance(s) in ASEAN Club Championship)	0	7	0
BG Pathum United	Total		10	1	1	0	2	0	1	0	14	1
Career total			98	9	8	0	4	0	1	0	111	9

== Honours ==
Ilves

- Finnish Cup: 2023

BG Pathum United

- Thai League Cup: 2023–24
