= Matheus Fornazari =

Brazilian footballer (born 1995)

Personal information
- Full name: Matheus Fornazari Custódio
- Date of birth: 27 November 1995 (age 30)
- Place of birth: Curitiba, Brazil
- Height: 2.03 m (6 ft 8 in)
- Position: Striker

Team information
- Current team: PSS Sleman
- Number: 18

Youth career
- 2007–2009: Paraná
- 2013: Taubaté
- 2013: Rio Preto

Senior career*
Years	Team	Apps	(Gls)
2014	Marcílio Dias	17	(5)
2015	Grêmio Barueri	20	(7)
2016–2017	União	2	(0)
2018	Atlética Francana	21	(6)
2019	Vilhena	2	(0)
2020	Flamengo-PI	5	(4)
2021	Rio Branco	23	(8)
2021–2022	Interclube	3	(0)
2022–2023	Louletano	20	(9)
2023–2024	Coimbrões	33	(18)
2024–2025	Sukhothai	27	(13)
2025–2026	BG Pathum United	13	(2)
2026–	PSS Sleman	7	(3)
- * Club domestic league appearances and goals as of 27 October 2026

Matheus Fornazari Custódio (born 27 November 1995), known as Matheus Fornazari, is a Brazilian professional footballer who plays as a striker for Super League club PSS Sleman.

== Club career ==
Born in Curitiba, Brazil, Fornazari spent his early career in Brazil at a young age with Paraná, Taubaté, and Rio Preto. Then, he played for numerous senior clubs in Brazil between 2014 until 2021.

In October 2021, Fornazari subsequently moved abroad to Africa, signing with Interclube to play in the first division of the Angolan league system. He made his league debut for Interclube on 9 October 2021, in a 1–0 home win over Cuando Cubango. In 2022, Fornazari move to Portugal, joined Louletano.

=== Sukhothai ===
Fornazari subsequently joined another Portugal club Coimbrões, before move to Thailand, signed a year contract with Thai League 1 club Sukhothai in July 2024. He made his league debut for Sukhothai on 10 August 2024 in a home game against BG Pathum United in a 1–3 lose. On 27 August 2024, Fornazari scored his first goal for Sukhothai in a 4–1 away lose over Port. On 26 October 2024, Fornazari scored the opening goal against Rayong, leading Sukhothai to a dominant 3–1 victory. On 8 November 2024, he scored a brace in a 5–2 win against Nongbua Pitchaya. On 27 April 2025, Fornazari scored a hat-trick in a 4–4 away draw against BG Pathum United.

Fornazari spent one season playing in the Thai League 1 with Sukhothai, scoring 13 goals in 27 league appearances.

=== BG Pathum United ===
The following season, he transferred to another Thai club BG Pathum United. He made his Thai League 1 debut for BG Pathum United on 16 August 2025, coming as a substitutes in second half for Tomoyuki Doi in a 2–2 draw over PT Prachuap. Four days later, he made his debut for the club in the 2025–26 ASEAN Club Championship, coming on as a starter in a match against Vietnamese club Cong An Hanoi in a 2–1 home win. Three days later, Fornazari scored his first league goal for BG Pathum United with scored a brace in a 2–1 win over Lamphun Warrior.

He recorded 10 goals and 1 assist in 24 total appearances across all competitions, including two goals in the AFC Champions League Two.

=== PSS Sleman ===
On 30 July 2026, Fornazari officially signed with Indonesian Super League club PSS Sleman on a free transfer ahead of the 2026–27 season. He scored his first unofficial goal for the club during a pre-season friendly match against Kendal Tornado on 8 August 2026. He made his league debut for PSS Sleman on 4 September 2026, in a 2–1 away lose against Bali United at the Kapten I Wayan Dipta Stadium. On 12 September 2026, Fornazari scored his first league goal for Super Elja in a 1–3 home lose over Madura United.
