= Joel López Pissano =

Argentine footballer

Personal information
- Full name: Joel Brandon López Pissano
- Date of birth: 6 January 1997 (age 29)
- Place of birth: Rosario, Argentina
- Height: 1.80 m (5 ft 11 in)
- Position: Attacking midfielder

Team information
- Current team: SHB Da Nang
- Number: 19

Youth career
- Rosario Central

Senior career*
Years	Team	Apps	(Gls)
2018–2023	Rosario Central	18	(1)
2018–2019	→ Emelec (loan)	23	(0)
2021	→ Orense (loan)	24	(1)
2022–2023	→ Atlético Grau (loan)	58	(10)
2024	Sport Boys	17	(0)
2025	GV San José	10	(4)
2025–2026	BG Pathum United	8	(0)
2026–	SHB Da Nang	15	(5)
- * Club domestic league appearances and goals as of 6 September 2026

Joel Brandon López Pissano (born 6 January 1997) is an Argentine professional footballer who plays as an attacking midfielder for V.League 1 club SHB Da Nang.

== Career ==
López Pissano began his career with Rosario Central. His promotion into the seniors came under manager Leonardo Fernández in February 2018, with the midfielder coming on from the substitutes bench in an Argentine Primera División fixture with Unión Santa Fe on 3 February; his next match was also his first professional start, playing the full duration of a 5–0 home win over Olimpo. López Pissano scored in first-team football for the first time on 11 March during a draw away to Vélez Sarsfield. He ended 2017–18 with thirteen appearances in all competitions, which included his Copa Sudamericana bow in April against São Paulo.

On 24 July 2018, López Pissano was loaned to Ecuadorian Serie A side Emelec. He remained there for twelve months, appearing in twenty-six fixtures across two seasons; including three games in the Copa Libertadores. The midfielder returned to Rosario in June 2019, subsequently spending the next year with their reserves. He began appearing for Rosario's first-team towards the end of 2020, as he made six appearances in the Copa de la Liga Profesional. On 20 January 2021, López Pissano returned to Ecuador to sign on loan with Orense.

== Career statistics ==
As of 21 January 2021.

Club statistics
Club	Season	League			Cup		League Cup		Continental		Other		Total	
Club	Season	Division	Apps	Goals	Apps	Goals	Apps	Goals	Apps	Goals	Apps	Goals	Apps	Goals
Rosario Central	2017–18	Primera División	12	1	0	0	—		1 (Note: Appearance(s) in the Copa Sudamericana)	0	0	0	13	1
Rosario Central	2018–19	Primera División	0	0	0	0	0	0	0	0	0	0	0	0
Rosario Central	2019–20	Primera División	0	0	0	0	0	0	—		0	0	0	0
Rosario Central	2020–21	Primera División	6	0	0	0	0	0	—		0	0	6	0
Rosario Central	Total		18	1	0	0	0	0	1	0	0	0	19	1
Emelec (loan)	2018	Serie A	19	0	0	0	—		3 (Note: Appearance(s) in the Copa Libertadores)	0	0	0	22	0
Emelec (loan)	2019	Serie A	4	0	0	0	—		0	0	0	0	4	0
Emelec (loan)	Total		23	0	0	0	—		3	0	0	0	26	0
Orense (loan)	2021	Serie A	0	0	0	0	—		—		0	0	0	0
Atlético Grau	2022	Liga 1 (Peru)	18	2	0	0	0	0	0	0	16	4	34	6
Atlético Grau	2023	Liga 1 (Peru)	13	1	0	0	0	0	0	0	11	3	24	4
Atlético Grau	Total		31	3	0	0	0	0	1	0	27	7	58	10
Sport Boys	2024	Liga 1 (Peru)	17	0	0	0	0	0	0	0	0	0	17	0
Club San José	2025	Primera División	10	4	2	1	7	1	0	0	0	0	19	6
Career total			41	1	0	0	0	0	4	0	0	0	45	1
