= Saranon Anuin =

Thai footballer

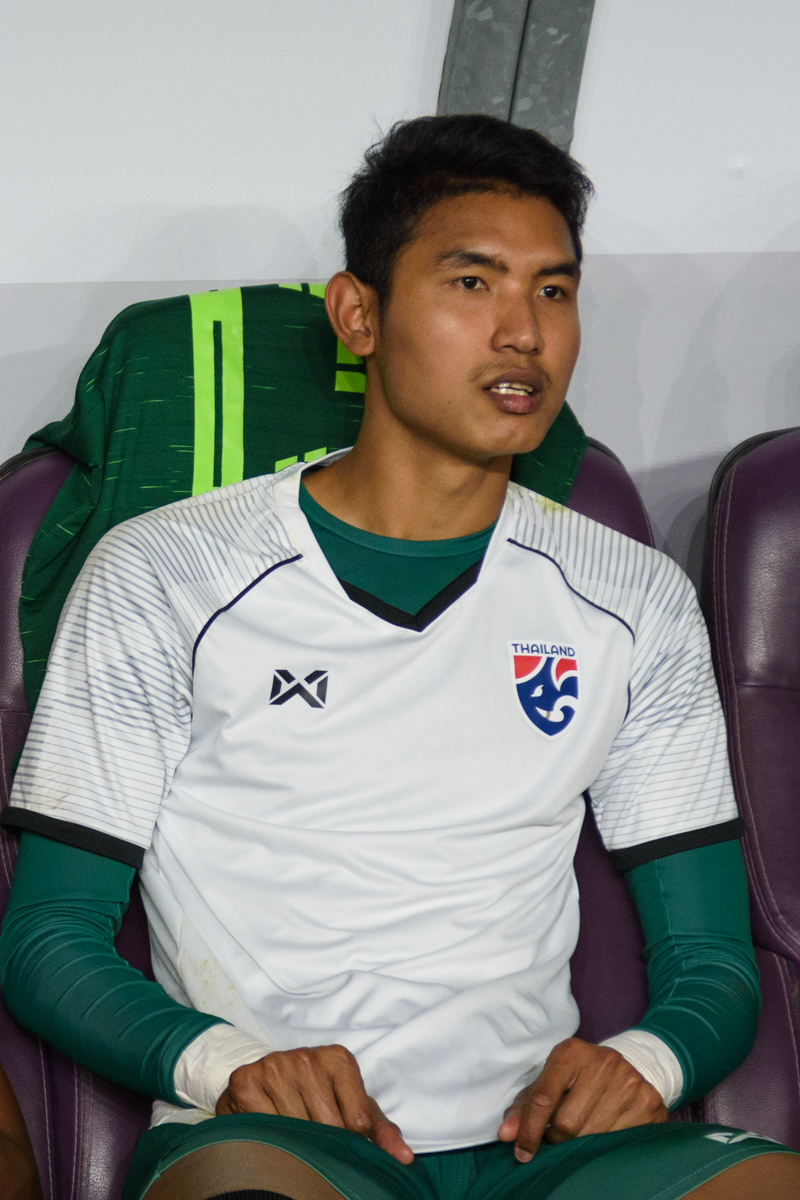
- Anuin with Thailand at the 2019 AFC Asian Cup

Personal information
- Full name: Saranon Anuin
- Date of birth: 24 March 1994 (age 32)
- Place of birth: Ban Phai, Khon Kaen, Thailand
- Height: 1.86 m (6 ft 1 in)
- Position: Goalkeeper

Team information
- Current team: BG Pathum United
- Number: 28

Senior career*
Years	Team	Apps	(Gls)
2015–2017	Nakhon Ratchasima	15	(0)
2018–2024	Chiangrai United	88	(0)
2024–	BG Pathum United	51	(0)

International career^{‡}
2024–	Thailand	9	(0)
Medal record
Men's football
Representing Thailand
FIFA ASEAN Cup
Runner-up	2026 Indonesia	Team
AFF Championship
Winner	AFF Mitsubishi Electric Cup 2022	Team
- * Club domestic league appearances and goals as of 9 January 2026 ‡ National team caps and goals as of 5 October 2026

Saranon Anuin (Thai: สรานนท์ อนุอินทร์, born 24 March 1994) is a Thai professional footballer who plays as a goalkeeper for Thai League 1 club BG Pathum United and the Thailand national team.

== Club career ==
=== Nakhon Ratchasima ===
Saranon linked up with Chiangrai United in January 2018 from Nakhon Ratchasima, for whom he made 15 league appearances in total.

=== Chiangrai United ===
In last season's Thai League 1, Saranon played in two games for Chiangrai United. Saranon last made an appearance in a competition game on March 28, playing 90 minutes for Chiangrai United against Samut Prakan City in a 2-1 success. The Chiangrai United goalkeeper has kept seven clean sheets this campaign, which is tied for the fifth most in the competition. He has amassed three yellow cards. Saranon Anuin is a goalkeeper at Chiangrai United who has appeared in the majority of their Thai League 1 games in 2020, making 22 appearances overall and playing 1,934 minutes. He has been selected in the starting XI in 21 of these appearances across their 30 fixtures and been used as a substitute on one occasion.

== International career ==
In 2018 he was called up by Thailand national team for the 2018 AFF Suzuki Cup, but did not make an appearance.

In 2019, He was named in Thailand's squad for the 2019 AFC Asian Cup in United Arab Emirates, but did not make an appearance.

In 2022, he was called up by Thailand national team for the 2022 AFF Championship, which they won.

On 26 January 2024, he made his debut for Thailand in their final group match against Saudi Arabia in the 2023 AFC Asian Cup, under Masatada Ishii. He saved a penalty in the game, kept a clean sheet, and was named man of the match in the match which ended 0-0.

== Career statistics ==
=== International ===
As of 4 September 2025

National team	Year	Apps	Goals
Thailand
Thailand	2024	3	0
Thailand	2025	3	0
Thailand	Total	6	0

== Honours ==
=== Club ===
Chiangrai United

- Thai League 1: 2019
- Thai FA Cup (2): 2018, 2020–21
- Thai League Cup: 2018
- Thailand Champions Cup: 2020

=== International ===
Thailand

- AFF Championship: 2022
- King's Cup: 2024, 2026
