= Slaviša Bogdanović =

Bosnian footballer

Personal information
- Date of birth: 11 October 1993 (age 33)
- Place of birth: Trebinje, Bosnia and Herzegovina
- Height: 1.93 m (6 ft 4 in)
- Position: Goalkeeper

Team information
- Current team: BG Pathum United
- Number: 1

Youth career
- –2022: Sarajevo

Senior career*
Years	Team	Apps	(Gls)
–2012	Leotar		
2012	Rad		
2012–2013	Spartak Subotica	0	(0)
2013	→ Palić Koming (loan)		
2013–2014	Dorćol		
2014–2015	Radnik Surdulica	1	(0)
2015	Srem Jakovo		
2015–2017	BSK Borča	42	(0)
2017–2018	Smederevo 1924		
2018–2019	Žarkovo	13	(0)
2019–2023	Velež Mostar	63	(0)
2023	Al-Qaisumah	4	(0)
2023–2024	Kozani	19	(0)
2024–2025	Al-Ain	34	(0)
2025–	BG Pathum United	0	(0)
- * Club domestic league appearances and goals as of 15 October 2023

Slaviša Bogdanović (born 11 October 1993) is a Bosnian professional footballer who plays as a goalkeeper for Thai League 1 club BG Pathum United.

== Career ==
=== Velež Mostar ===
Bogdanović signed his contract with Bosnian club Velež Mostar in January 2019. In the match against AEK Athens in the second qualifying round, Bogdanović saved three penalties and eliminated the Greek team.

=== Al-Qaisumah ===
Bogdanović signed his contract with Saudi club Al-Qaisumah in July 2023. He left the club in October 2023.

=== Kozani ===
Bogdanović signed with Kozani on 10 October 2023.

=== Al-Ain ===
On 15 August 2024, Bogdanović joined Saudi Arabian club Al-Ain.

== Career statistics ==
=== Club ===
As of match played 15 October 2023

Appearances and goals by club, season and competition
Club	Season	League			National cup (Note: Includes Bosnia and Herzegovina Football Cup)		Europe		Total	
Club	Season	League	Apps	Goals	Apps	Goals	Apps	Goals	Apps	Goals
Velež Mostar	2018–19	First League of FBiH	3	0	0	0	0	0	3	0
Velež Mostar	2019–20	Bosnian Premier League	1	0	2	0	0	0	3	0
Velež Mostar	2020–21	Bosnian Premier League	16	0	2	0	0	0	18	0
Velež Mostar	2021–22	Bosnian Premier League	22	0	5	0	6 (Note: appearances in UEFA Europa Conference League qualifying)	0	33	0
Velež Mostar	2022–23	Bosnian Premier League	21	0	3	0	2 (Note: appearances in UEFA Europa Conference League qualifying)	0	8	0
Total			63	0	12	0	8	0	83	0
Al-Qaisumah	2023–24	First Division League	4	0	0	0	0	0	4	0
Kozani	2023–24	Super League Greece 2	2	0	0	0	0	0	2	0
Career total			69	0	12	0	8	0	89	0

== Honours ==
Velež Mostar

- First League of FBiH: 2018–19
- Bosnian Cup: 2021–22
