= Nathan James (footballer) =

English footballer

Personal information
- Full name: Nathan Tunchatchawan James
- Date of birth: 28 September 2004 (age 22)
- Place of birth: Coventry, England
- Height: 1.90 m (6 ft 3 in)
- Position: Defender

Team information
- Current team: BG Pathum United
- Number: 22

Youth career
- 2019–2021: Leicester City
- 2021–2023: Burnley
- 2023: Barnsley

Senior career*
Years	Team	Apps	(Gls)
2023–2025	Barnsley	0	(0)
2023	→ Farsley Celtic (loan)	1	(0)
2024	→ Mickleover (loan)	4	(0)
2025–	BG Pathum United	2	(0)

International career^{‡}
2022	Thailand U20	2	(0)
2026–	Thailand U23	1	(0)
- * Club domestic league appearances and goals as of 17:29, 27 October 2024 (UTC) ‡ National team caps and goals as of 09:29, 9 January 2026 (UTC)

Nathan Tunchatchawan James (born 28 September 2004) is a professional footballer who plays as a defender for Thai League 1 club BG Pathum United. Born in England, he has represented Thailand at youth international level.

== Career ==
James turned professional at Barnsley in July 2023, having impressed academy manager Bobby Hassell during his time playing in the Academy at Burnley. He made his first-team debut for Barnsley on 5 September 2023, coming on as a 67th-minute substitute for Maël de Gevigney in an EFL Trophy group stage game with Grimsby Town; Barnsley won the match 2–0. On 25 October, he joined Farsley Celtic on loan.

In October 2024, James joined Northern Premier League Premier Division side Mickleover on a two-month loan deal.

In July 2025, James joined Thai League 1 side BG Pathum United.

== International career ==
James was called up to the Thailand squad for the 2026 AFC U-23 Asian Cup and made his debut on 8 January 2026 in a defeat to Australia.

== Career statistics ==
As of match played 26 September 2023

Appearances and goals by club, season and competition
Club	Season	League			FA Cup		EFL Cup		Other		Total	
Club	Season	Division	Apps	Goals	Apps	Goals	Apps	Goals	Apps	Goals	Apps	Goals
Barnsley	2023–24	EFL League One	0	0	0	0	0	0	2 (Note: Appearance/s in the EFL Trophy)	0	2	0
Farsley Celtic (loan)	2023–24	National League North	0	0	0	0	0	0	0	0	0	0
Career total			0	0	0	0	0	0	2	0	2	0
