= 2025–26 Philippines Football League =

Philippines Football League
- Season: 2025–26
- Dates: August 30, 2025 – May 30, 2026
- Country: Philippines
- Champions: Manila Digger; 1st title
- Champions League Two: Manila Digger (Preliminary stage)
- Challenge League: One Taguig
- Matches: 135
- Goals: 648 (4.8 per match)
- Top goalscorer: Ousman Gai (32 goals)
- Best goalkeeper: Miloš Čupić (12 clean sheets)
- Biggest home win: One Taguig 13–0 Philippine Army (October 5); One Taguig 13–0 Tuloy (March 1)
- Biggest away win: Tuloy 0–14 Manila Digger (March 25)
- Highest scoring: Tuloy 0–14 Manila Digger (March 25)
- Longest winning run: One Taguig (Oct 5 – Apr 25) (15 matches)
- Longest unbeaten run: Manila Digger (Aug 30 – May 2) (20 matches)
- Longest winless run: Philippine Army (Aug 30 – May 20) (24 matches)
- Longest losing run: Valenzuela PB–Mendiola (Sept 21 – Mar 7) (13 matches)
- All statistics correct as of 27 May 2026.

The 2025–26 Philippines Football League was the eighth season of the Philippines Football League (PFL), the professional football league of the Philippines. Eleven teams participated this season, which began on August 30, 2025.

Kaya–Iloilo were the defending champions, having clinched the previous season's title on the final match day, but were mathematically ruled unable to retain their title for the fourth year running after Manila Digger's draw with Cebu on May 16.

Manila Digger won their first title by two points on the final matchday, after drawing with second-placed One Taguig. The season saw the league's scoring and clean sheet records broken for the first time since the 2019 season, with Manila Digger's Ousman Gai scoring 32 goals and One Taguig's Miloš Čupić keeping 12 clean sheets.

== Teams ==
The 2025–26 season have eleven teams participating. Last season's eighth- and ninth-placed teams, Loyola and the Philippine YNT, will not participate this season. In August, three teams from the 2024 season, namely DB Garelli United, Tuloy and Philippine Army, would rejoin the league.

Davao Aguilas, who finished sixth in the previous season, relocated their club to Makati and renamed to Aguilas–UMak F.C., with the latter derived from the University of Makati Stadium, where the club had previously trained and held matches. After changing its name last season, Maharlika Taguig once again changed its name to simply Maharlika F.C. Mendiola 1991 relocated from Imus, Cavite to Valenzuela and renamed to Valenzuela PB–Mendiola due to sponsorship reasons.

Team	Location (Note: General location where the club is based in. Only select clubs have their own/designated home stadium.)
Aguilas–UMak	Makati, Metro Manila
Don Bosco Garelli United	Makati, Metro Manila
Dynamic Herb Cebu	Talisay, Cebu
Kaya–Iloilo	Iloilo City, Iloilo
Maharlika	Taguig, Metro Manila
Manila Digger	Taguig, Metro Manila
One Taguig	Taguig, Metro Manila
Philippine Army	Taguig, Metro Manila
Stallion Laguna	Biñan, Laguna
Tuloy	Muntinlupa, Metro Manila
Valenzuela PB–Mendiola	Valenzuela, Metro Manila

== Stadiums ==
All games in the first round were held at the Rizal Memorial Stadium in Manila. For the second round, Dynamic Herb Cebu played home matches at the Dynamic Herb–Borromeo Sports Complex, first hosting Philippine Army on February 11.

2025–26 PFL venue	Manila	Talisay, Cebu
2025–26 PFL venue	Rizal Memorial Stadium	Dynamic Herb–Borromeo Sports Complex
2025–26 PFL venue	Capacity: 12,873	Capacity: 550

== Personnel and kits ==
Team	Head coach	Captain	Kit manufacturer	Sponsors
Aguilas–UMak	(Philippines) Oliver Colina	(Philippines) Arnel Amita	Primal	A Brown Company^{1}, Markenburg^{2}, Blast TV^{3}, PAGSS^{3}
Don Bosco Garelli United	(Philippines) Karl Claudio	(Philippines) Banjo Mahinay	Blaze Athletics	Elan Vita^{1}, Techno Tamashi^{1}, Smokin' Hills^{2}
Dynamic Herb Cebu	(Philippines) Glenn Ramos	(Philippines) Roberto Corsame	RAD Apparel	Nature's Spring^{1}, Herb Food Solutions^{2}
Kaya–Iloilo	(Japan) Yu Hoshide	(Philippines) Audie Menzi	LGR Sportswear	LBC^{1}
Maharlika	(South Korea) Moon Hong	(Philippines) Jorrel Aristorenas	Chronos Athletics	M1 International^{1}, Matchday Media^{2}, Coca-Cola^{2}
Manila Digger	(China) Haijun Li	(Philippines) Shirmar Felongco	UCAN	Zealand Metal^{1}, Prime Rehabilitation^{2}, Starbalm^{2}, Yison^{3}
One Taguig	(Philippines) Arvin Soliman	(Philippines) Daisuke Sato	Chronos Athletics	I Love Taguig^{3}
Philippine Army	(Philippines) Roel Gener	(Philippines) Jalsor Soriano	Chronos Athletics	Cherry Turf^{2}
Stallion Laguna	(Philippines) Ernest Nierras	(Philippines) Matthew Nierras	Blaze Athletics	Giligan's Restaurant^{1}, SCID^{2}, Pythos^{2}
Tuloy	(Japan) Taketomo Suzuki	(Philippines) Harry Nuñez	Skechers	Tuloy Foundation^{4}
Valenzuela PB–Mendiola	(Philippines) Dan Padernal	(Philippines) Ruben Doctora	MEBL Apparel	Pureblends^{1}, Top Down^{1}, Anytime Fitness^{2}, Pablings^{4}

Notes:

1. Located on the front of the shirt.
2. Located on the back of the shirt.
3. Located on the sleeves.
4. Located on the shorts.

=== Coaching changes ===
Team	Outgoing coach	Manner of departure	Date of vacancy	Position in table	Incoming coach	Date of appointment
Maharlika	(South Korea) Jung Dong-gyu	Undisclosed	May 28, 2025	Pre-season	(South Korea) Moon Hong	July 29, 2025
Aguilas–UMak	(Philippines) Aber Ruzgal	Undisclosed	May 15, 2025	Pre-season	(Germany) Jörg Steinebrunner	August 1, 2025
Manila Digger	(Philippines) Kim Versales	Undisclosed	July 25, 2025	Pre-season	(China) Haijun Li	August 10, 2025
One Taguig	(Philippines) Arvin Soliman	Undisclosed	July 31, 2025	Pre-season	(Republic of Ireland) Scott Cooper	August 17, 2025
Aguilas–UMak	(Germany) Jörg Steinebrunner	Mutual agreement	October 16, 2025	6th (Regular season)	(Philippines) Franklin Muescan (interim)	October 18, 2025
One Taguig	(Republic of Ireland) Scott Cooper	Signed by Visakha	November 17, 2025	2nd (Regular season)	(Philippines) Arvin Soliman	November 23, 2025
Aguilas–UMak	(Philippines) Franklin Muescan	End of interim tenure	January 16, 2026	6th (Regular season)	(Philippines) Oliver Colina	January 16, 2026

== Foreign players ==
Players name in bold indicates the player was registered during the mid-season transfer window.

Team	Players								Former players^{1}
Aguilas–UMak	(Brazil) Pedro de Paula	(Cameroon) David Koum	(England) **Kareem Akinnibi**	(England) **Tom Unsworth**	(Ghana) **Iddrisu Natogma**	(Ghana) **Richard Tetteh**	(Indonesia) Reycredo Beremanda	(Indonesia) Muhammad Mishbah	List: (Australia) Nathan Hancock; (Argentina) Nahuel Amarilla; (Indonesia) Made Kaicen; (Malaysia) V. Ruventhiran; (Timor-Leste) Mouzinho; (Timor-Leste) Olagar Xavier
Aguilas–UMak	(Japan) Tomoki Fuhihira	(Japan) Ikumi Hiruta	(Japan) Timothy Shiraoka	(Japan) Kira Yamamoto	(Mali) Boubacar Diallo	(Mali) Issa Diallo	(Nigeria) Ibrahim Adamu	(Togo) **Mikailou Djibrila**	List: (Australia) Nathan Hancock; (Argentina) Nahuel Amarilla; (Indonesia) Made Kaicen; (Malaysia) V. Ruventhiran; (Timor-Leste) Mouzinho; (Timor-Leste) Olagar Xavier
Don Bosco Garelli United	(Australia) **Samuel Crowford**	(Brazil) **Felipe Melgaço**	(Cameroon) Desmond Ngai	(England) **Daniel Stokoe**	(Ghana) **Ebenezer Agyei**	(Ghana) Michael Brobbey	(Iran) **Matin Mohtasham**	(Japan) Shotaro Ishii	List: (Cameroon) Yohan Mbida; (Colombia) Arturo; (Georgia (country)) Robert Gingichashvili; (Ghana) Pious Owusu; (Japan) Hiromasa Ishikawa; (Japan) Yuya Tanaka
Don Bosco Garelli United	(Japan) **Hayato Kame**	(Japan) **Kai Kimura**	(Japan) Yuta Yamaguchi	(Lebanon) **Karim Chahine**	(Nigeria) **Solomon Okereke**	(Senegal) Babacar Ndiaye	(Senegal) Pape Malang Traore	(South Korea) **Kim Min-kap**	List: (Cameroon) Yohan Mbida; (Colombia) Arturo; (Georgia (country)) Robert Gingichashvili; (Ghana) Pious Owusu; (Japan) Hiromasa Ishikawa; (Japan) Yuya Tanaka
Dynamic Herb Cebu	(Australia) **Kirk Aitken**	(Brazil) Victor Cabral	(Cameroon) **Willy Kapawa**	(Ivory Coast) **Lamine Konate**	(Ivory Coast) Marius Kore	(Japan) **Kaito Asano**	(Japan) **Arya Igami**	(Japan) **Shinichiro Ochiai**	List: (Australia) Amanhom Khamis; (Australia) Esrom Paulos; (Australia) Bol Tong; (Cameroon) Denil Ango; (Canada) Sam Azimzadeh; (Japan) Yuta Nomura; (Tajikistan) Abdulfatohi Khudoidodzoda
Dynamic Herb Cebu	(Japan) Kazuha Sudo	(Japan) **Naoki Takasu**	(Portugal) Anderson Pinto	(Senegal) Abou Sy	(Tunisia) Rami Jridi	(Turkey) **Göktuğ Demiroğlu**			List: (Australia) Amanhom Khamis; (Australia) Esrom Paulos; (Australia) Bol Tong; (Cameroon) Denil Ango; (Canada) Sam Azimzadeh; (Japan) Yuta Nomura; (Tajikistan) Abdulfatohi Khudoidodzoda
Kaya–Iloilo	(Brazil) Ricardo Verza	(France) **Pathy Malumandsoko**	(Ghana) Eric Esso	(Japan) Shuto Komaki	(Japan) **Taiyo Toyoda**	(Japan) Kaishu Yamazaki	(Norway) **Julius Myrbakk**	(United States) Lucas del Rosario	List: (United States) Alfredo Cortez; (Denmark) Magnus Ravn
Kaya–Iloilo	(United States) Brandon Zambrano								List: (United States) Alfredo Cortez; (Denmark) Magnus Ravn
Maharlika	(Canada) **Stanislaw Pankiewicz**	(Colombia) **Cristian Molina**	(Democratic Republic of the Congo) **Joslyn Katuala**	(Eritrea) Fahmi Ibrahim	(Ghana) Daniel Oppong	(Ivory Coast) Dini Ouattara	(Japan) **Yuya Kashiwabara**	(South Korea) Jo Woo-hyuk	List: (South Korea) Kang Young-suk
Maharlika	(South Korea) Kang Beom-seok	(South Korea) **Kim Ji-an**	(South Korea) Kim Jin-hyeon	(South Korea) Park Eun-soo	(South Korea) **Park Jae-hyun**				List: (South Korea) Kang Young-suk
Manila Digger	(Cameroon) Dilane Wamba Tafem	(China) Su Diao	(The Gambia) **Assan Badjie**	(The Gambia) Saikou Ceesay	(The Gambia) Ousman Gai	(The Gambia) **Mustapha Jallow**	(The Gambia) Modou Joof	(The Gambia) Modou Manneh	List: (Japan) Hayato Kame; (Sweden) Lars William Kvist
Manila Digger	(The Gambia) Omar Njie	(The Gambia) David Sambou	(The Gambia) Baboucarr Touray	(Ghana) Daniel Ashley	(Japan) Yuga Watanabe	(Nigeria) Ifeanyi Ugwu			List: (Japan) Hayato Kame; (Sweden) Lars William Kvist
One Taguig	(Brazil) Goldeson	(Cameroon) Henri Bandeken	(Canada) **Marcus Haber**	(Serbia) Miloš Čupić	(Ghana) Frank Akoto	(Ghana) Isaac Opoku Agyemang	(Ghana) Stephen Halm	(Ghana) Abdul Razak Yusif	List: (Brazil) Breno; (Brazil) Tiago Mafra; (Iran) Hamed Aghaei; (Iran) Arash Shahamati; (Nigeria) Onyeka Obi; (Nigeria) Solomon Okereke
One Taguig	(Iran) Hamed Hajimehdi	(Japan) So Omae	(Japan) Naoto Hiraishi						List: (Brazil) Breno; (Brazil) Tiago Mafra; (Iran) Hamed Aghaei; (Iran) Arash Shahamati; (Nigeria) Onyeka Obi; (Nigeria) Solomon Okereke
Philippine Army	No foreign players registered								
Stallion Laguna	(Argentina) Cristián Ivanobski	(Argentina) Ricardo Sendra	(Barbados) Terence Smith	(Brazil) Magson Dourado	(Brazil) Gabriel Farias	(Cameroon) **Kevin Ebene Moukouta**	(Cameroon) Arnol Tchamgoue	(France) **Ousmane Badji**	List: (Canada) Jorden Kananga; (England) Ismaila Diallo; (Iran) Matin Mohtasham; (Trinidad and Tobago) Michael Kedman; (United States) Jack Landreth; (United States) Marco Vlahos; (Yemen) Tareq Shihab
Stallion Laguna	(France) **Benoit Beaujeon**	(France) **Issa Gakou**	(Iran) Amir Memari	(Mexico) Juan Trujillo	(Netherlands) Deane Mountney	(Pakistan) **Yousuf Butt**	(Suriname) **Zamoranho Ho-A-Tham**	(United States) **Abraham Placito**	List: (Canada) Jorden Kananga; (England) Ismaila Diallo; (Iran) Matin Mohtasham; (Trinidad and Tobago) Michael Kedman; (United States) Jack Landreth; (United States) Marco Vlahos; (Yemen) Tareq Shihab
Tuloy	(Northern Mariana Islands) **Markus Toves**								List: None
Valenzuela PB–Mendiola	(Iran) **Keyvan Mottaghian**	(Cayman Islands) **Maleek Powell**	(Cameroon) Yohan Mbida	(Colombia) **Arturo**	(Ghana) **Adonai Gomez**	(Iran) **Amir Azadnouran**	(Iran) Mehdi Ghobadi	(Iran) Salar Nezamikhah	List: (Brazil) Gustavo; (Brazil) Felipe Melgaço; (Cameroon) Victor Nkoa; (France) François Anticona; (Ivory Coast) Franck Anoh; (Jamaica) Javon Turner; (Malaysia) A. Mahendran; (Portugal) Paulo Barbosa; (South Korea) Choi Tae-yang; (South Korea) Park Seo-yeom; (United States) Jackson Etheridge
Valenzuela PB–Mendiola	(Iran) **Ali Pourallahyar**	(Ivory Coast) Yohann Fofana	(Lebanon) Ali Ghamloush	(Nigeria) **Onyeka Obi**	(South Korea) **Kyoung Hyeon-ko**	(South Korea) **Park Yong-min**	(South Korea) **Song Jae-hong**	(United States) **Domenic-Shawn Davis**	List: (Brazil) Gustavo; (Brazil) Felipe Melgaço; (Cameroon) Victor Nkoa; (France) François Anticona; (Ivory Coast) Franck Anoh; (Jamaica) Javon Turner; (Malaysia) A. Mahendran; (Portugal) Paulo Barbosa; (South Korea) Choi Tae-yang; (South Korea) Park Seo-yeom; (United States) Jackson Etheridge

- **^1** Former players only include players who left after the start of the 2025–26 season.

== Regular season ==
=== League table ===
The eleven teams will play in a double round robin consisting of 20 games.

Pos	Team	Pld	W	D	L	GF	GA	GD	Pts	Qualification
1	Manila Digger	20	17	3	0	103	13	+90	54	Championship round
2	One Taguig	20	17	1	2	84	9	+75	52	Championship round
3	Dynamic Herb Cebu	20	13	3	4	70	21	+49	42	Championship round
4	Kaya–Iloilo	20	13	2	5	68	13	+55	41	Championship round
5	Stallion Laguna	20	9	6	5	58	22	+36	33	Championship round
6	Aguilas–UMak	20	10	2	8	45	28	+17	32	Championship round
7	Maharlika	20	9	2	9	43	35	+8	29	Classification round
8	Don Bosco Garelli United	20	5	0	15	32	74	−42	15	Classification round
9	Tuloy	20	3	2	15	27	119	−92	11	Classification round
10	Valenzuela PB-Mendiola	20	2	1	17	13	99	−86	7	Classification round
11	Philippine Army	20	0	2	18	14	124	−110	2	Classification round

Source: PFF

=== Positions by round ===
Team ╲ Round	1	2	3	4	5	6	7	8	9	10	11	12	13	14	15	16	17	18	19	20
Aguilas–UMak	8	9	6	7	5	6	7	7	6	6	6	6	6	5	5	5	6	6	6	6
Don Bosco Garelli United	9	9	10	9	9	9	9	9	9	9	9	9	9	9	9	9	9	9	8	8
Dynamic Herb Cebu	7	6	8	5	7	7	4	4	4	4	4	4	4	3	3	3	3	3	3	3
Kaya–Iloilo	1	1	1	1	1	1	1	3	2	3	3	3	2	4	4	4	4	4	4	4
Maharlika	3	5	4	6	4	4	6	6	7	7	7	7	7	7	7	7	7	7	7	7
Manila Digger	2	3	2	2	2	3	3	2	3	2	2	2	3	2	2	2	2	2	1	1
One Taguig	4	2	3	3	3	2	2	1	1	1	1	1	1	1	1	1	1	1	2	2
Philippine Army	11	11	11	11	11	11	11	11	11	11	11	11	11	11	11	11	11	11	11	11
Stallion Laguna	5	8	5	4	6	5	5	5	5	5	5	5	5	6	6	6	5	5	5	5
Tuloy	6	4	7	8	8	8	8	8	8	8	8	8	8	8	8	8	8	8	9	9
Valenzuela PB–Mendiola	10	7	9	10	10	10	10	10	10	10	10	10	10	10	10	10	10	10	10	10

Championship round
Classification round

Source: PFF

=== Results by round ===
Team ╲ Round	1	2	3	4	5	6	7	8	9	10	11	12	13	14	15	16	17	18	19	20
Aguilas–UMak	L	L	W	W	W	W	L	D	W	D	L	W	W	W	W	L	L	L	W	L
Don Bosco Garelli United	L	L	L	W	L	L	L	L	L	L	L	L	L	W	W	L	L	L	W	W
Dynamic Herb Cebu	L	W	L	W	D	W	W	W	W	W	W	W	W	W	D	W	W	L	D	L
Kaya–Iloilo	W	W	W	W	W	L	W	L	W	W	W	W	W	L	L	D	D	W	L	W
Maharlika	W	L	W	L	W	W	L	L	W	L	L	L	D	W	L	D	W	W	W	L
Manila Digger	W	D	W	W	W	D	W	W	D	W	W	W	W	W	W	W	W	W	W	W
One Taguig	W	W	L	W	W	W	W	W	W	W	W	W	W	W	W	W	W	W	D	L
Philippine Army	L	L	L	L	L	L	L	L	L	L	L	D	D	L	L	L	L	L	L	L
Stallion Laguna	D	L	W	W	L	W	D	W	L	W	D	W	W	D	L	W	W	D	D	L
Tuloy	L	W	L	L	L	L	L	L	W	W	L	L	D	L	L	D	L	L	L	L
Valenzuela PB–Mendiola	L	W	L	L	L	L	L	L	L	L	L	L	L	L	L	D	L	L	L	W

Source: PFF
W = Win; D = Draw; L = Loss

=== Results ===
Team	AUM	DGU	DHC	KAY	MAH	MAD	TAG	ARM	STA	TUL	VMD
Aguilas–UMak	—	3–0	0–2	2–1	2–1	0–0	1–4	2–1	0–2	5–2	5–0
Don Bosco Garelli United	0–3	—	0–6	1–7	0–1	2–6	0–7	7–1	0–8	3–1	4–0
Dynamic Herb Cebu	1–0	4–2	—	1–1	4–0	0–4	1–4	10–2	1–1	10–0	5–0
Kaya–Iloilo	1–0	6–0	3–0	—	3–1	0–2	0–1	12–0	1–1	9–1	8–0
Maharlika	2–0	3–1	1–4	0–2	—	0–6	0–1	5–1	3–1	8–0	7–0
Manila Digger	3–1	6–1	1–1	1–0	3–2	—	1–0	10–0	1–1	8–2	12–0
One Taguig	3–0	7–0	2–1	1–0	1–0	0–3	—	13–0	1–1	13–0	9–0
Philippine Army	0–5	1–9	0–5	0–4	1–1	0–8	0–8	—	1–5	2–2	0–1
Stallion Laguna	2–0	4–0	0–1	0–1	1–1	1–5	1–2	7–0	—	12–1	5–0
Tuloy	2–7	3–0	0–4	1–9	2–3	0–14	0–10	6–2	0–2	—	1–1
Valenzuela PB–Mendiola	1–7	1–2	0–5	0–3	2–4	2–9	0–1	4–2	1–3	0–3	—

Source: PFF
Legend: Blue = left column team win; Yellow = draw; Red = top row team win.
For upcoming matches, an "a" indicates there is an article about the rivalry between the two participants.

== Championship round ==
The top six teams from the regular season phase will advance to the championship round, which will adopt a single round robin format. Points from the regular season are included.

=== League table ===
Pos	Team	Pld	W	D	L	GF	GA	GD	Pts	Qualification
1	Manila Digger (C)	25	18	6	1	109	17	+92	60	Qualification for the 2026–27 AFC Champions League Two Qualifying play-offs
2	One Taguig	25	18	4	3	91	15	+76	58	Qualification for the 2026–27 AFC Challenge League Group Stage
3	Kaya–Iloilo	25	15	3	7	76	21	+55	48	
4	Dynamic Herb Cebu	25	14	6	5	74	25	+49	48	
5	Aguilas–UMak	25	12	4	9	51	34	+17	40	
6	Stallion Laguna	25	9	10	6	64	31	+33	37	

Updated to match(es) played on May 27 2026. Source: PFF
(C) Champions

=== Results ===
Team	AUM	DHC	KAY	MAD	TAG	STA
Aguilas–UMak	—	—	—	1–0	1–1	—
Dynamic Herb Cebu	0–1	—	1–0	1–1	—	—
Kaya–Iloilo	3–1	—	—	0–3	—	2–2
Manila Digger	—	—	—	—	1–1	1–1
One Taguig	—	1–1	1–3	—	—	3–0
Stallion Laguna	2–2	1–1	—	—	—	—

Updated to match(es) played on 27 May 2026. Source: PFF
Legend: Blue = left column team win; Yellow = draw; Red = top row team win.
For upcoming matches, an "a" indicates there is an article about the rivalry between the two participants.

== Classification round ==
The bottom five teams from the first two rounds will likewise contest the classification round, which will also adopt a single round robin format.

=== League table ===
Pos	Team	Pld	W	D	L	GF	GA	GD	Pts
1	Maharlika	24	12	3	9	55	42	+13	39
2	Don Bosco Garelli United	24	7	1	16	49	83	−34	22
3	Tuloy	24	5	3	16	39	126	−87	18
4	Valenzuela PB–Mendiola	24	3	2	19	21	109	−88	11
5	Philippine Army	24	0	2	22	19	144	−125	2

Source: PFF

=== Results ===
Team	DGU	MAH	ARM	TUL	VMD
Don Bosco Garelli United	—	—	8–1	—	3–3
Maharlika	3–2	—	5–2	—	—
Philippine Army	—	—	—	1–5	1–2
Tuloy	2–4	1–1	—	—	—
Valenzuela PB–Mendiola	—	2–3	—	1–4	—

Source: PFF
Legend: Blue = left column team win; Yellow = draw; Red = top row team win.
For upcoming matches, an "a" indicates there is an article about the rivalry between the two participants.

== Season statistics ==
=== Top goalscorers ===
As of 30 May 2026

Rank	Player	Team	Goals
1	(The Gambia) Ousman Gai	Manila Digger	32
2	(Philippines) Griffin McDaniel	Stallion Laguna	24
3	(Philippines) Patrick Reichelt	One Taguig	21
4	(The Gambia) Saikou Ceesay	Manila Digger	17
4	(The Gambia) Baboucarr Touray	Manila Digger	17
6	(Japan) Yuta Yamaguchi	Don Bosco Garelli United	16
7	(Philippines) Kenji Nishioka	Manila Digger	14
8	(Nigeria) Solomon Okereke	Don Bosco Garelli United	13
9	(Philippines) Mike Ott	Kaya–Iloilo	12
9	(Philippines) Cyrelle Saut	Tuloy	12

=== Top assists ===
As of 30 May 2026

Rank	Player	Team	Assists
1	(Philippines) Mark Hartmann	One Taguig	19
2	(Philippines) Mike Ott	Kaya–Iloilo	16
2	(Mexico) Juan Trujillo	Stallion Laguna	16
4	(Philippines) Kenji Nishioka	Manila Digger	13
5	(The Gambia) Modou Manneh	Manila Digger	10
5	(The Gambia) Baboucarr Touray	Manila Digger	10
5	(Japan) Yuga Watanabe	Manila Digger	10
8	(South Korea) Kim Jin-hyeon	Maharlika	9
9	(Brazil) Goldeson	One Taguig	8
10	(Philippines) Andres Aldeguer	One Taguig	7
10	(Philippines) Lucas del Rosario	Kaya–Iloilo	7
10	(Philippines) Cyrelle Saut	Tuloy	7
10	(Japan) Yuta Yamaguchi	Don Bosco Garelli United	7

=== Own goals ===
As of 2 May 2026

Rank	Player	Team	Own goals
1	(Philippines) Miguel Clarino	Aguilas–UMAK	1
1	(Philippines) John Delariarte	Philippine Army	1
1	(Philippines) Enzo Lucindo	Maharlika	1
1	(Nigeria) Onyeka Obi	Valenzuela PB–Mendiola	1
1	(South Korea) Park Eun-soo	Maharlika	1
1	(Philippines) Kevin Skinker	Valenzuela PB–Mendiola	1
1	(Northern Mariana Islands) Markus Toves	Tuloy	1
1	(Senegal) Pape Malang Traore	Don Bosco Garelli United	1
1	(Nigeria) Divine Uguafakwu	Valenzuela PB–Mendiola	1

=== Hat-tricks ===
As of 20 May 2026

Player	Teami	Result	Against	Date
(Philippines) Jesus Melliza	Kaya–Iloilo	12–0 (H)	Philippine Army	30 August 2025
(The Gambia) Saikou Ceesay^{4}	Manila Digger	9–2 (A)	Valenzuela PB–Mendiola	30 August 2025
(Philippines) Sherwin Basindanan	Kaya–Iloilo	8–0 (H)	Valenzuela PB–Mendiola	21 September 2025
(Nigeria) Ibrahim Adamu	Aguilas–UMak	5–0 (A)	Philippine Army	27 September 2025
(The Gambia) Baboucarr Touray	Manila Digger	8–2 (H)	Tuloy	5 October 2025
(Brazil) Goldeson	One Taguig	13–0 (H)	Philippine Army	5 October 2025
(Philippines) Patrick Reichelt	One Taguig	13–0 (H)	Philippine Army	5 October 2025
(Philippines) Griffin McDaniel^{6}	Stallion Laguna	7–0 (H)	Philippine Army	25 October 2025
(Philippines) Griffin McDaniel^{5}	Stallion Laguna	8–0 (A)	Don Bosco Garelli United	22 November 2025
(The Gambia) Saikou Ceesay^{4}	Manila Digger	8–0 (A)	Philippine Army	29 November 2025
(Norway) Julius Myrbakk	Kaya–Iloilo	6–0 (H)	Don Bosco Garelli United	7 February 2026
(Philippines) John Lloyd Jalique	Tuloy	6–2 (H)	Philippine Army	7 February 2026
(The Gambia) Baboucarr Touray	Manila Digger	12–0 (H)	Valenzuela PB–Mendiola	11 February 2026
(The Gambia) Mustapha Jallow^{4}	Manila Digger	12–0 (H)	Valenzuela PB–Mendiola	11 February 2026
(Senegal) Abou Sy^{4}	Dynamic Herb Cebu	10–2 (H)	Philippine Army	11 February 2026
(Norway) Julius Myrbakk	Kaya–Iloilo	3–1 (H)	Maharlika	11 February 2026
(Japan) Kaito Asano	Dynamic Herb Cebu	10–0 (H)	Tuloy	21 February 2026
(Philippines) Griffin McDaniel^{4}	Stallion Laguna	5–1 (A)	Philippine Army	22 February 2026
(The Gambia) Ousman Gai	Manila Digger	6–1 (H)	Don Bosco Garelli United	25 February 2026
(Philippines) Griffin McDaniel	Stallion Laguna	4–0 (H)	Don Bosco Garelli United	28 February 2026
(Philippines) Patrick Reichelt^{5}	One Taguig	13–0 (H)	Tuloy	1 March 2026
(Mali) Issa Diallo^{4}	Aguilas–UMak	7–2 (A)	Tuloy	8 March 2026
(Cameroon) Desmond Ngai^{4}	Don Bosco Garelli United	7–1 (H)	Philippine Army	11 March 2026
(Cameroon) Kevin Ebene Moukouta^{5}	Stallion Laguna	12–1 (H)	Tuloy	21 March 2026
(Philippines) Mark Hartmann^{5}	One Taguig	8–0 (A)	Philippine Army	25 March 2026
(The Gambia) Ousman Gai^{6}	Manila Digger	14–0 (A)	Tuloy	25 March 2026
(The Gambia) Ousman Gai^{6}	Manila Digger	10–0 (H)	Philippine Army	29 March 2026
(Eritrea) Fahmi Ibrahim	Maharlika	8–0 (H)	Tuloy	12 April 2026
(Japan) Kai Kimura	Don Bosco Garelli United	3–1 (H)	Tuloy	19 April 2026
(Nigeria) Solomon Okereke^{4}	Don Bosco Garelli United	9–1 (A)	Philippine Army	25 April 2026
(The Gambia) Ousman Gai	Manila Digger	5–1 (A)	Stallion Laguna	2 May 2026
(Japan) Yuta Yamaguchi^{4}	Don Bosco Garelli United	4–2 (A)	Tuloy	10 May 2026
(Nigeria) Solomon Okereke	Don Bosco Garelli United	8–1 (H)	Philippine Army	20 May 2026
(Japan) Yuta Yamaguchi	Don Bosco Garelli United	8–1 (H)	Philippine Army	20 May 2026

Note

(H) – Home; (A) – Away ^{4} Player scored four goals
^{5} Player scored five goals^{6} Player scored six goals

=== Clean sheets ===
As of 30 May 2026

Rank	Player	Team	Clean sheets
1	(Serbia) Miloš Čupić	One Taguig	12
2	(The Gambia) Omar Njie	Manila Digger	8
3	(Tunisia) Rami Jridi	Dynamic Herb Cebu	7
4	(United States) Alfredo Cortez	Kaya–Iloilo	6
5	(Philippines) Michael Asong	Manila Digger	4
5	(Philippines) Kenry Balobo	Maharlika	4
5	(Cameroon) Henri Bandeken	One Taguig	4
5	(Philippines) Joseph Ceniza	Dynamic Herb Cebu	4
5	(Philippines) Enrico Mangaoang	Aguilas–UMak	4
10	(Philippines) Patrick Deyto	Kaya–Iloilo	3
10	(Philippines) Jessie Semblante	Dynamic Herb Cebu	3
10	(Japan) Timothy Shiraoka	Aguilas–UMak	3

=== Discipline ===
As of 30 May 2026

==== Player ====
- Most yellow cards: 8
  - (Ivory Coast) Yohann Fofana (Valenzuela PB–Mendiola)
- Most red cards: 2
  - (Philippines) Amir Aningalan (Valenzuela PB–Mendiola)
  - (Brazil) Magson Dourado (Stallion Laguna)
  - (Ivory Coast) Dini Ouattara (Aguilas–UMak)

==== Club ====
- Most yellow cards: 59
  - Aguilas–UMak
- Fewest yellow cards: 11
  - Tuloy
- Most red cards: 6
  - Philippine Army
- Fewest red cards: 0
  - Don Bosco Garelli United

== Awards ==
The following awards were given to players after the conclusion of the regular season.

Award	Winner	Club
Golden Ball	(The Gambia) Modou Manneh	Manila Digger
Golden Boot	(The Gambia) Ousman Gai	Manila Digger
Golden Glove	(Serbia) Miloš Čupić	One Taguig
