= 2025–26 Kaya F.C.–Iloilo season =

Kaya–Iloilo
2025–26 season
- Owner: Una Kaya Futbol Club, Inc.
- Chairman: Santi Araneta
- Head Coach: (Japan) Yu Hoshide
- Stadium: Iloilo Sports Complex; Rizal Memorial Stadium; New Clark City Athletics Stadium
- Philippines Football League: 3rd
- AFC Champions League Two: Group Stage
- Top goalscorer: League: Mike Ott (11); All: Mike Ott (12)
- Biggest win: 12–0 v Philippine Army (Home); August 30, 2025 (Philippines Football League)
- Biggest defeat: 0–3 v Tampines Rovers (Home); September 18, 2025 (AFC Champions League Two)

The 2025–26 season of Kaya–Iloilo is the club's 9th competitive season in the top-flight since the foundation of the Philippines Football League and their 18th competitive season in the club's history. The club will be competing in the AFC Champions League Two this season as champions of the PFL last season, and will enter the PFL as 3-time back-to-back champions.

== Coaching staff ==
As of 2025

| Position | Name |
|---|---|
| Head coach | (Japan) Yu Hoshide |
| Assistant coaches | (Philippines) Oliver Colina (Philippines) Norman Fegidero |
| Goalkeeping coach | (Philippines) Hayeson Pepito |
| Physiotherapists | (Philippines) Eunice Maliuanag (Philippines) Joshua Castelo (Philippines) Nessy Cachero–Castelo |

== Transfers ==
=== Pre-season transfers ===
==== In ====
| Position | Player | Transferred from | Fee | Source |
|---|---|---|---|---|
| DF | (Denmark) Magnus Ravn | (Denmark) Brønshøj BK | Free | |
| MF | (Philippines) Mike Ott | (Cambodia) Visakha | Free | |
| MF | (Philippines) Paolo Bugas | (Philippines) Davao Aguilas | Free | |
| MF | (United States) Brandon Zambrano | (Philippines) Maharlika Taguig | Free | |
| FW | (Philippines) Kenshiro Daniels | (Thailand) Nakhon Ratchasima | Free | |

==== Out ====
| Position | Player | Transferred To | Fee | Source |
|---|---|---|---|---|
| DF | (Japan) Akito Saito | (Thailand) Trat | Free | |
| DF | (Mali) Konaté Bandiougou | Free agent | N/A | |
| MF | (Philippines) Mark Swainston | (England) Lewes | Free | |
| MF | (Philippines) Julian Romero | (Philippines) Maharlika | Free | |
| FW | (Ghana) Ernest Barfo | Free agent | N/A | |

=== Mid-season transfers ===
==== In ====
| Position | Player | Transferred from | Fee | Source |
|---|---|---|---|---|
| DF | (Japan) Taiyo Toyoda | (Mongolia) SP Falcons | Free | |
| FW | (Norway) Julius Myrbakk | (Norway) Arendal Fotball | Free | |
| DF | (France) Pathy Malumandsoko | (France) GC Lucciana | Free | |
| GK | (Philippines) Hayeson Pepito | Free agent | Free | |

==== Out ====
| Position | Player | Transferred To | Fee | Source |
|---|---|---|---|---|
| DF | (Philippines) Simone Rota | Retirement | – | |
| MF | (Philippines) Kenshiro Daniels | (Thailand) Lamphun Warriors | Free | |
| GK | (United States) Alfredo Cortez | Free agency | – | |
| DF | (Denmark) Magnus Ravn | Free agency | – | |
| MF | (Philippines) Gavin Muens | Free agency | – | |

== Squad ==
| No. | Name | Nat. | Date of Birth (Age) | Signed in | Signed from |
Goalkeepers
| 16 | Nathan Bata | (Philippines) | January 24, 2005 (age 21) | 2021 | Academy |
| 40 | Patrick Deyto | (Philippines) | February 15, 1990 (age 36) | 2024 | (Thailand) Chonburi |
| 21 | Hayeson Pepito | (Philippines) | January 12, 1993 (age 33) | 2026 | (Philippines) Stallion Laguna |
Defenders
| 2 | Taiyo Toyoda | (Japan) | December 22, 2000 (age 25) | 2026 | (Mongolia) SP Falcons |
| 4 | Pathy Malumandsoko | (France) | May 11, 2000 (age 26) | 2026 | (France) GC Lucciana |
| 12 | Mar Diano | (Philippines) | July 24, 1997 (age 29) | 2021 | (Philippines) Azkals Development Team |
| 15 | Marco Casambre (co-captain) | (Philippines) | December 18, 1998 (age 27) | 2021 | (Thailand) Sukhothai |
| 22 | Fitch Arboleda | (Philippines) | January 4, 1993 (age 33) | 2020 | (Philippines) Stallion Laguna |
| 44 | Audie Menzi (Co-captain) | (Philippines) | October 11, 1994 (age 31) | 2018 | (Philippines) FEU Tamaraws |
Midfielders
| 5 | Mike Ott | (Philippines) | March 2, 1995 (age 31) | 2025 | (Cambodia) Visakha |
| 6 | Brandon Zambrano | (United States) | November 20, 1995 (age 30) | 2025 | (Philippines) Maharlika Taguig |
| 8 | Marwin Angeles | (Philippines) | September 1, 1991 (age 35) | 2022 | (Indonesia) Persik Kediri |
| 23 | Sherwin Basindanan | (Philippines) | November 20, 1998 (age 27) | 2023 | (Philippines) FEU Tamaraws |
| 25 | Eric Esso (Co-captain) | (Ghana) | June 21, 1994 (age 32) | 2023 | (Ghana) Accra Hearts of Oak |
| 30 | Lucas del Rosario | (Philippines) | April 30, 1999 (age 27) | 2024 | (Philippines) Maharlika Taguig |
| 39 | Paolo Bugas | (Philippines) | October 22, 1994 (age 31) | 2025 | (Philippines) Davao Aguilas |
| 88 | Kaishu Yamazaki | (Japan) | July 12, 1997 (age 29) | 2023 | (Indonesia) Persikabo 1973 |
Forwards
| 7 | Jovin Bedic | (Philippines) | June 8, 1990 (age 36) | 2013 | (Philippines) Stallion Laguna |
| 9 | Ricardo Verza | (Brazil) | April 28, 1997 (age 29) | 2024 | Bahrain SC |
| 10 | Jesus Melliza (Captain) | (Philippines) | April 20, 1992 (age 34) | 2020 | (Philippines) Stallion Laguna |
| 14 | Shuto Komaki | (Japan) | May 30, 2000 (age 26) | 2023 | (Singapore) Albirex Niigata (S) |
| 17 | Julius Myrbakk | (Norway) | December 21, 2000 (age 25) | 2026 | (Norway) Arendal Fotball |
| 77 | Martini Rey | (Philippines) | June 13, 1999 (age 27) | 2023 | (Philippines) FEU Tamaraws |

== Competitions ==
=== Overview ===
| Competition | Record | | | | | | | | Started round | Final position / round | First match | Last match |
| Competition | G | W | D | L | GF | GA | GD | Win % | Started round | Final position / round | First match | Last match |
|---|---|---|---|---|---|---|---|---|---|---|---|---|
| Philippines Football League | 16 | 11 | 1 | 4 | 59 | 10 | +49 | 68.75 | Matchday 1 | TBC | August 30, 2025 | TBA |
| AFC Champions League Two | 6 | 0 | 0 | 6 | 4 | 15 | −11 | 0.00 | Group Stage | Group Stage (4th) | September 18, 2025 | December 11, 2025 |
| Total | 22 | 11 | 1 | 10 | 63 | 25 | +38 | 50.00 | | | | |

Updated to match played March 8, 2026
Source: Competitions

=== Philippines Football League ===
==== League table ====
| Pos | Team | Pld | W | D | L | GF | GA | GD | Pts | Qualification |
|---|---|---|---|---|---|---|---|---|---|---|
| 1 | Manila Digger | 20 | 17 | 3 | 0 | 103 | 13 | +90 | 54 | Championship round |
| 2 | One Taguig | 20 | 17 | 1 | 2 | 84 | 9 | +75 | 52 | Championship round |
| 3 | Dynamic Herb Cebu | 20 | 13 | 3 | 4 | 70 | 21 | +49 | 42 | Championship round |
| 4 | Kaya–Iloilo | 20 | 13 | 2 | 5 | 68 | 13 | +55 | 41 | Championship round |
| 5 | Stallion Laguna | 20 | 9 | 6 | 5 | 58 | 22 | +36 | 33 | Championship round |
| 6 | Aguilas–UMak | 20 | 10 | 2 | 8 | 45 | 28 | +17 | 32 | Championship round |
| 7 | Maharlika | 20 | 9 | 2 | 9 | 43 | 35 | +8 | 29 | Classification round |
| 8 | Don Bosco Garelli United | 20 | 5 | 0 | 15 | 32 | 74 | −42 | 15 | Classification round |
| 9 | Tuloy | 20 | 3 | 2 | 15 | 27 | 119 | −92 | 11 | Classification round |
| 10 | Valenzuela PB-Mendiola | 20 | 2 | 1 | 17 | 13 | 99 | −86 | 7 | Classification round |
| 11 | Philippine Army | 20 | 0 | 2 | 18 | 14 | 124 | −110 | 2 | Classification round |

Source: PFF

==== Results summary ====
| Overall | | | | | | | | Home | | | | | | Away | | | | | |
| Pld | W | D | L | GF | GA | GD | Pts | W | D | L | GF | GA | GD | W | D | L | GF | GA | GD |
|---|---|---|---|---|---|---|---|---|---|---|---|---|---|---|---|---|---|---|---|
| 16 | 11 | 1 | 4 | 59 | 10 | +49 | 34 | 7 | 1 | 2 | 43 | 6 | +37 | 4 | 0 | 2 | 16 | 4 | +12 |

Last updated: 8 March 2026.
Source: Competitive matches

==== Results by matchday ====
| Matchday | 1 | 2 | 3 | 4 | 5 | 6 | 7 | 8 | 9 | 10 | 11 | 12 | 13 | 14 | 15 | 16 | 17 | 18 | 19 | 20 | 21 |
|---|---|---|---|---|---|---|---|---|---|---|---|---|---|---|---|---|---|---|---|---|---|
| Ground | H | H | H | H | A | A | A | H | A | A | H | H | H | H | A | H | A | | | | |
| Result | W | W | W | W | W | L | W | L | W | W | W | W | W | L | L | D | | | | | |
| Position | 1 | 1 | 1 | 1 | 1 | 1 | 1 | 3 | 3 | 3 | 3 | 3 | | | | | | | | | |

Updated to match(es) played on March 8, 2026. Source: Matches
A = Away; H = Home; W = Win; D = Draw; L = Loss; P = Postponed

==== Matches ====
| August 30, 2025 1 | Kaya–Iloilo | 12–0 | Philippine Army | Manila |
| 16:00 UTC+8 | Bedic 11'; Ott 24', 43'; Melliza 35' (pen.), 86', 90+3'; Daniels 62'; Komaki 70', 73'; Rey 83'; Diano 84'; Menzi 88' | Report | | Stadium: Rizal Memorial Stadium |

| September 13, 2025 2 | Kaya–Iloilo | 1–0 | Aguilas–UMak | Manila |
| 20:30 UTC+8 | Ott 51' | Report | Bongolan (yellow card) 56'; Pickering (yellow card) 58'; Palpal-Latoc (yellow card) 61'; Hancock (yellow card) 78' | Stadium: Rizal Memorial Stadium |

| September 21, 2025 3 | Kaya–Iloilo | 8–0 | Valenzuela PB–Mendiola | Manila |
| 16:00 UTC+8 | Ott 14', 33'; Rey 19'; Angeles 31'; Basindanan 51', 57'; Ravn (red card) 69'; Bedic 90+2' | Report | Anoh (red card) 69' | Stadium: Rizal Memorial Stadium |

| September 28, 2025 4 | Kaya–Iloilo | 3–0 | Dynamic Herb Cebu | Manila |
| 16:00 UTC+8 | Melliza (yellow card) 12' (goal) 26'; Ott 36'; Muens (yellow card) 67'; Yamazaki (yellow card) 73'; Zambrano 88' | Report | Leddel (yellow card) 31'; Koré (yellow card) 45+3'; Corsame (yellow card) 65' | Stadium: Rizal Memorial Stadium |

| October 18, 2025 5 | Stallion Laguna | 0–1 | Kaya–Iloilo | Manila |
| 20:30 UTC+8 | McDaniel (yellow card) 38' | Report | Yamazaki (yellow card) 34'; Esso 73' | Stadium: Rizal Memorial Stadium |

| October 26, 2025 6 | One Taguig | 1–0 | Kaya–Iloilo | Manila |
| 19:00 UTC+8 | Akoto 31'; Reichelt (yellow card) 64'; Omae (yellow card) 87'; Sato (yellow card) 88'; Hartmann (yellow card) 90+1' | Report | Yamazaki (yellow card) 64'; Bugas (yellow card) 78' | Stadium: Rizal Memorial Stadium |

| November 2, 2025 7 | Don Bosco Garelli | 1–7 | Kaya–Iloilo | Manila |
| 15:00 UTC+8 | Mbida 70' (yellow card) 90+2'; Owusu (yellow card) 85' | Report | Angeles 13', 36'; Rota 30'; Del Rosario 45+6'; Ott 62'; Arboleda 84'; Rey 90' | Stadium: Rizal Memorial Stadium |

| November 22, 2025 8 | Kaya–Iloilo | 0–2 | Manila Digger | Manila |
| 20:30 UTC+8 | Diano (yellow card) 36'; Ott (yellow card) 42'; Rey (yellow card) 88'; Basindanan (yellow card) 90+10' | Report | Touray 18'; Gai (yellow card) 75' (goal) 89'; Manneh (yellow card) 83'; Sambou (yellow card) 90+16' | Stadium: Rizal Memorial Stadium |

| November 30, 2025 9 | Tuloy | 1–6 | Kaya–Iloilo | Manila |
| 19:00 UTC+8 | Saut 83' | Report | Yamazaki 6', 84'; Bedic 10', 79'; Jesus Melliza 58', 69' | Stadium: Rizal Memorial Stadium |

| January 17, 2026 10 | Maharlika | 0–2 | Kaya–Iloilo | Manila |
| 15:45 UTC+8 | Ibrahim (yellow card) 21'; Kang (yellow card) 77' | Report | Arboleda (yellow card) 15'; Rey 24'; Ott 26'; Diano (yellow card) 45+5' | Stadium: Rizal Memorial Stadium |

| February 7, 2026 11 | Kaya–Iloilo | 6–0 | Don Bosco Garelli United | Manila |
| 15:00 UTC+8 | Komaki 20'; Myrbakk 23', 41', 54'; Ott 55'; Rey 79' | Report | | Stadium: Rizal Memorial Stadium |

| February 11, 2026 12 | Kaya–Iloilo | 3–1 | Maharlika | Manila |
| 17:45 UTC+8 | Myrbakk 50', 56', 61'; Diano (yellow card) 67'; Bedic (yellow card) 90+3' | Report | Kashiwabara (yellow card) 29'; De Gracia 90+4' | Stadium: Rizal Memorial Stadium |

| February 15, 2026 13 | Kaya–Iloilo | 9–1 | Tuloy | Manila |
| 15:00 UTC+8 | Del Rosario 17'; Malumandsoko 45+1'; Ott 58', 68'; Toves 65' (o.g.); Myrbakk 67'; Komaki 79'; Melizza 80'; Rey 90' (yellow card) 90+2' | Report | Uracoy 50' | Stadium: Rizal Memorial Stadium |

| February 21, 2026 14 | Kaya–Iloilo | 0–1 | One Taguig | Manila |
| 19:00 UTC+8 | Esso (yellow card) 47'; Diano (yellow card) 66' | Report | Agyemang 28' (yellow card) 31' (red card); Halm (yellow card) 79'; Schröck (yellow card) 90+4' | Stadium: Rizal Memorial Stadium |

| February 25, 2026 15 | Manila Digger | 1–0 | Kaya–Iloilo | Manila |
| 19:00 UTC+8 | Manneh (yellow card) 24'; Touray 33'; Jarvis (yellow card) 77'; Baas (yellow card) 87' | Report | Zambrano (yellow card) 20'; Rey (yellow card) 76' | Stadium: Rizal Memorial Stadium |

| March 8, 2026 16 | Kaya–Iloilo | 1–1 | Stallion Laguna | Manila |
| 19:00 UTC+8 | Del Rosario (yellow card) 43'; Myrbakk 55'; Pepito (red card) | Report | Badji 89'; McDaniel (red card) | Stadium: Rizal Memorial Stadium |

| March 14, 2026 17 | Dynamic Herb Cebu | v | Kaya–Iloilo | Talisay, Cebu |
| 17:00 UTC+8 | | | | Stadium: Dynamic Herb Sports Complex |

=== AFC Champions League Two ===
==== Group Stage ====
| Pos | Team | Pld | W | D | L | GF | GA | GD | Pts | Qualification | BGT | PHS | BGP | KAY |
|---|---|---|---|---|---|---|---|---|---|---|---|---|---|---|
| 1 | (Singapore) Tampines Rovers | 6 | 5 | 1 | 0 | 14 | 5 | +9 | 16 | Advance to round of 16 | — | 1–0 | 2–1 | 5–3 |
| 2 | (South Korea) Pohang Steelers | 6 | 4 | 1 | 1 | 7 | 2 | +5 | 13 | Advance to round of 16 | 1–1 | — | 2–0 | 2–0 |
| 3 | (Thailand) BG Pathum United | 6 | 2 | 0 | 4 | 5 | 8 | −3 | 6 | | 0–2 | 0–1 | — | 2–1 |
| 4 | (Philippines) Kaya–Iloilo | 6 | 0 | 0 | 6 | 4 | 15 | −11 | 0 | | 0–3 | 0–1 | 0–2 | — |

Source: ACL2
Rules for classification: Tiebreakers

| September 18, 2025 1 | Kaya–Iloilo (Philippines) | 0–3 | (Singapore) Tampines Rovers | Capas |
| | Ravn (yellow card) 90+2' | AFC | Buhagiar 46', 72'; Yoshimoto 52'; Kazama (yellow card) 78' | Stadium: New Clark City Athletics Stadium; Attendance: 120; Referee: Ahmed Faisal Al-Ali (Jordan) |

| October 2, 2025 2 | Pohang Steelers (South Korea) | 2–0 | (Philippines) Kaya–Iloilo | Pohang |
| | Yamazaki 82' (o.g.); Seo-woong 90+3' | AFC | Arboleda (yellow card) 71' | Stadium: Pohang Steel Yard; Referee: Di Wang (China) |

| October 23, 2025 3 | Kaya–Iloilo (Philippines) | 0–2 | (Thailand) BG Pathum United | Capas |
| | Casambre (yellow card) 15'; Basindanan (yellow card) 83' | AFC | Emaviwe 10'; Doi 69' | Stadium: New Clark City Athletics Stadium; Referee: Thoriq Munir Alkatiri (Indonesia) |

| November 6, 2025 4 | BG Pathum United (Thailand) | 2–1 | (Philippines) Kaya–Iloilo | Pathum Thani |
| | Fornazari 9', 34' | AFC | Daniels 15'; Basindanan (yellow card) 78'; Rota (yellow card) 89' | Stadium: True BG Stadium; Referee: Mohamed Khaled Tarrar Deham (Bahrain) |

| November 27, 2025 5 | Tampines Rovers (Singapore) | 5–3 | (Philippines) Kaya–Iloilo | Singapore City |
| | Higashikawa 7', 56'; Sumi (yellow card) 19'; Najeeb (yellow card) 29'; Yoshimoto 37'; Buhagiar 47'; Ramli 86' | AFC | Rey (yellow card) 26'; Ott 66'; Bugas 74'; Adli 85' (o.g.) | Stadium: Bishan Stadium; Referee: Ahmad Yacouh Ibrahim (Jordan) |

| December 11, 2025 6 | Kaya–Iloilo (Philippines) | 0–1 | (South Korea) Pohang Steelers | Capas |
| | Arboleda (yellow card) 76'; Ott (yellow card) 90+2' | AFC | Jae-jun 18'; Jeong-won (yellow card) 81' | Stadium: New Clark City Athletics Stadium |

== Statistics ==
=== Appearances ===
As of match played March 8, 2026

Players with no appearances are not included on the list
Players on Italic left the club mid-season

| No. | Player | Pos. | Philippines Football League | AFC Champions League Two | Total |
|---|---|---|---|---|---|
| – | (Philippines) Gavin Muens | MF | 3 | 3+1 | 7 |
| 2 | (Japan) Taiyo Toyoda | DF | 6 | | 6 |
| 4 | (France) Pathy Malumandsoko | DF | 5+1 | | 6 |
| 5 | (Philippines) Mike Ott | MF | 13+3 | 6 | 22 |
| 6 | (United States) Brandon Zambrano | MF | 10+4 | 4 | 18 |
| 7 | (Philippines) Jovin Bedic | FW | 7+5 | 3 | 15 |
| 8 | (Philippines) Marwin Angeles | MF | 7+3 | | 10 |
| 10 | (Philippines) Jesus Melliza | FW | 12+3 | 5 | 21 |
| 12 | (Philippines) Mar Diano | DF | 11+2 | 5 | 18 |
| 14 | (Japan) Shuto Komaki | FW | 7+2 | | 9 |
| 15 | (Philippines) Marco Casambre | DF | 9+4 | 6 | 19 |
| 16 | (Philippines) Nathan Bata | GK | 1+1 | | 2 |
| 17 | (Norway) Julius Myrbakk | FW | 5+1 | | 6 |
| 20 | (Philippines) Kenshiro Daniels | MF | 3+4 | 6 | 13 |
| 22 | (Philippines) Fitch Arboleda | DF | 7 | 0+2 | 9 |
| 23 | (Philippines) Simone Rota | DF | 4+2 | 1+1 | 8 |
| 24 | (Philippines) Sherwin Basindanan | MF | 3+3 | | 6 |
| 25 | (Ghana) Eric Esso | MF | 9+3 | 6 | 18 |
| 30 | (Philippines) Lucas del Rosario | MF | 7+5 | 1 | 13 |
| 32 | (Denmark) Magnus Ravn | DF | 2+2 | 5+1 | 10 |
| 39 | (Philippines) Paolo Bugas | MF | 4+7 | 0+2 | 13 |
| 40 | (Philippines) Patrick Deyto | GK | 7+1 | 1 | 9 |
| 44 | (Philippines) Audie Menzi | DF | 7+5 | 2 | 14 |
| 77 | (Philippines) Martini Rey | FW | 5+9 | 1+1 | 16 |
| 88 | (Japan) Kaishu Yamazaki | MF | 13+1 | 6 | 20 |
| 98 | (United States) Alfredo Cortez | GK | 8 | 5 | 13 |

=== Goalscorers ===
As of match played March 8, 2026

Players on Italic left the club mid-season

| Rank | No. | Pos. | Player | Philippines Football League | AFC Champions League Two | Total |
|---|---|---|---|---|---|---|
| 1 | 5 | MF | (Philippines) Mike Ott | 11 | 1 | 12 |
| 2 | 17 | FW | (Norway) Julius Myrbakk | 8 | 0 | 8 |
| 3 | 10 | FW | (Philippines) Jesus Melliza | 7 | 0 | 7 |
| 4 | 77 | FW | (Philippines) Martini Rey | 6 | 0 | 6 |
| 5 | 7 | FW | (Philippines) Jovin Bedic | 4 | 0 | 5 |
| 5 | 14 | FW | (Japan) Shuto Komak | 4 | 0 | 4 |
| 7 | 8 | MF | (Philippines) Marwin Angeles | 3 | 0 | 3 |
| 7 | 24 | MF | (Philippines) Sherwin Basindanan | 3 | 0 | 3 |
| 9 | 14 | FW | (Japan) Shuto Komaki | 2 | 0 | 2 |
| 9 | 20 | FW | (Philippines) Kenshiro Daniels | 1 | 1 | 2 |
| 9 | 30 | FW | (Philippines) Lucas Del Rosario | 2 | 0 | 2 |
| 9 | 88 | DF | (Japan) Kaishu Yamazaki | 2 | 0 | 2 |
| 13 | 4 | DF | (France) Pathy Malumandsoko | 1 | 0 | 1 |
| 13 | 6 | MF | (United States) Brandon Zambrano | 1 | 0 | 1 |
| 13 | 12 | DF | (Philippines) Mar Diano | 1 | 0 | 1 |
| 13 | 22 | DF | (Philippines) Fitch Arboleda | 1 | 0 | 1 |
| 13 | 23 | DF | (Philippines) Simone Rota | 1 | 0 | 1 |
| 13 | 25 | MF | (Ghana) Eric Esso | 1 | 0 | 1 |
| 13 | 30 | MF | (Philippines) Lucas Del Rosario | 1 | 0 | 1 |
| 13 | 39 | MF | (Philippines) Paolo Bugas | 0 | 1 | 1 |
| 13 | 44 | DF | (Philippines) Audie Menzi | 1 | 0 | 1 |
| Totals | | | | 59 | 3 | 62 |

=== Assists ===
As of match played February 28, 2026

Players on Italic left the club mid-season

| Rank | No. | Pos. | Player | Philippines Football League | AFC Champions League Two | Total |
|---|---|---|---|---|---|---|
| 1 | 5 | MF | (Philippines) Mike Ott | 10 | 1 | 11 |
| 2 | 30 | MF | (Philippines) Lucas del Rosario | 6 | 0 | 6 |
| 3 | 10 | FW | (Philippines) Jesus Melliza | 4 | 1 | 5 |
| 4 | 6 | MF | (United States) Brandon Zambrano | 3 | 0 | 3 |
| 4 | 14 | MF | (Japan) Shuto Komaki | 3 | 0 | 3 |
| 4 | 20 | MF | (Philippines) Kenshiro Daniels | 3 | 0 | 3 |
| 7 | 7 | FW | (Philippines) Jovin Bedic | 2 | 0 | 2 |
| 7 | 12 | DF | (Philippines) Mar Diano | 2 | 0 | 2 |
| 7 | 25 | MF | (Ghana) Eric Esso | 2 | 0 | 2 |
| 7 | 32 | DF | (Denmark) Magnus Ravn | 2 | 0 | 2 |
| 7 | 39 | MF | (Philippines) Paolo Bugas | 2 | 0 | 2 |
| 12 | – | MF | (Philippines) Gavin Muens | 1 | 0 | 1 |
| 12 | 4 | DF | (France) Pathy Malumandsoko | 1 | 0 | 1 |
| 12 | 8 | MF | (Philippines) Marwin Angeles | 1 | 0 | 1 |
| 12 | 23 | DF | (Philippines) Simone Rota | 1 | 0 | 1 |
| 12 | 24 | MF | (Philippines) Sherwin Basindanan | 1 | 0 | 1 |
| 12 | 77 | FW | (Philippines) Martini Rey | 1 | 0 | 1 |
| 12 | 44 | DF | (Philippines) Audie Menzi | 1 | 0 | 1 |
| 12 | 88 | MF | (Japan) Kaishu Yamazaki | 1 | 0 | 1 |
| Totals | | | | 47 | 1 | 48 |

=== Clean sheets ===
Players on Italic left the club mid-season

As of match played March 8, 2026

| Rank | No. | Nat. | Player | Matches played | Goals against | Clean sheets | | | |
| Rank | No. | Nat. | Player | Matches played | Goals against | Philippines Football League | AFC Champions League Two | Total | Clean sheet % |
|---|---|---|---|---|---|---|---|---|---|
| 1 | 98 | (United States) | Alfredo Cortez | 12 | 17 | 6 | 0 | 6 | 50.0% |
| 2 | 40 | (Philippines) | Patrick Deyto | 9 | 5 | 2 | 0 | 2 | 22.2% |
| 3 | 16 | (Philippines) | Nathan Bata | 2 | 1 | 1 | 0 | 1 | 50.0% |
| Totals | | | | 23 | 23 | 9 | 0 | 9 | 39.1% |

=== Disciplinary record ===
As of match played March 8, 2026

Players on Italic left the club mid-season

| Rank | No. | Pos. | Player | Philippines Football League | | | AFC Champions League Two | | | Total | | |
| Rank | No. | Pos. | Player | Booked | (yellow card) (yellow-red card) | Sent off (straight red) | Booked | (yellow card) (yellow-red card) | Sent off (straight red) | Booked | (yellow card) (yellow-red card) | Sent off (straight red) |
|---|---|---|---|---|---|---|---|---|---|---|---|---|
| 1 | 77 | FW | (Philippines) Martini Rey | 4 | 0 | 0 | 1 | 0 | 0 | 5 | 0 | 0 |
| 2 | 12 | DF | (Philippines) Mar Diano | 4 | 0 | 0 | 0 | 0 | 0 | 4 | 0 | 0 |
| 3 | 22 | DF | (Philippines) Fitch Arboleda | 1 | 0 | 0 | 2 | 0 | 0 | 3 | 0 | 0 |
| 3 | 24 | MF | (Philippines) Sherwin Basindanan | 2 | 0 | 0 | 1 | 0 | 0 | 3 | 0 | 0 |
| 3 | 88 | MF | (Japan) Kaishu Yamazaki | 3 | 0 | 0 | 0 | 0 | 0 | 3 | 0 | 0 |
| 6 | 5 | MF | (Philippines) Mike Ott | 1 | 0 | 0 | 1 | 0 | 0 | 2 | 0 | 0 |
| 6 | 32 | DF | (Denmark) Magnus Ravn | 0 | 0 | 1 | 1 | 0 | 0 | 1 | 0 | 1 |
| 8 | 4 | MF | (Philippines) Gavin Muens | 1 | 0 | 0 | 0 | 0 | 0 | 1 | 0 | 0 |
| 8 | 5 | MF | (United States) Brandon Zambrano | 1 | 0 | 0 | 0 | 0 | 0 | 1 | 0 | 0 |
| 8 | 7 | FW | (Philippines) Jovin Bedic | 1 | 0 | 0 | 0 | 0 | 0 | 1 | 0 | 0 |
| 8 | 10 | FW | (Philippines) Jesus Melliza | 1 | 0 | 0 | 0 | 0 | 0 | 1 | 0 | 0 |
| 8 | 11 | GK | (Philippines) Hayeson Pepito | 0 | 0 | 1 | 0 | 0 | 0 | 0 | 0 | 1 |
| 8 | 15 | DF | (Philippines) Marco Casambre | 0 | 0 | 0 | 1 | 0 | 0 | 1 | 0 | 0 |
| 8 | 23 | DF | (Philippines) Simone Rota | 0 | 0 | 0 | 1 | 0 | 0 | 1 | 0 | 0 |
| 8 | 25 | MF | (Ghana) Eric Esso | 1 | 0 | 0 | 0 | 0 | 0 | 1 | 0 | 0 |
| 8 | 30 | MF | (Philippines) Lucas Del Rosario | 1 | 0 | 0 | 0 | 0 | 0 | 1 | 0 | 0 |
| 8 | 39 | MF | (Philippines) Paolo Bugas | 1 | 0 | 0 | 0 | 0 | 0 | 1 | 0 | 0 |
| 8 | 44 | DF | (Philippines) Audie Menzi | 1 | 0 | 0 | 0 | 0 | 0 | 1 | 0 | 0 |

=== Hat-tricks ===
As of match played February 28, 2026

| Player | Against | Result | Date | Competition |
|---|---|---|---|---|
| (Philippines) Jesus Melliza | Philippine Army | 12–0 (H) | August 30, 2025 | Philippines Football League |
| (Philippines) Sherwin Basindanan | Valenzuela PB–Mendiola | 8–0 (H) | September 21, 2025 | Philippines Football League |
| (Norway) Julius Myrbakk | Don Bosco Garelli United | 6–0 (H) | February 7, 2026 | Philippines Football League |
| (Norway) Julius Myrbakk | Maharlika | 3–1 (H) | February 11, 2026 | Philippines Football League |
