= Victor Cabral =

Brazilian footballer (born 1995)

Personal information
- Full name: Victor Luis Ferreira Cabral
- Date of birth: 11 February 1995 (age 31)
- Place of birth: São José das Palmeiras, Paraná, Brazil
- Height: 1.80 m (5 ft 11 in)
- Position: Attacking midfielder

Team information
- Current team: Dynamic Herb Cebu
- Number: 36

Youth career
- 2011: São Bento
- 2013: Osvaldo Cruz

Senior career*
Years	Team	Apps	(Gls)
2014–2015	Osvaldo Cruz		
2015–2017	Club Puebla		
2017	Sansare		
2017–2018	Sololá	12	(0)
2018–2019	Olancho	16	(0)
2019–2020	Las Delicias	16	(0)
2020–2022	Kirivong Sok Sen Chey	14	(0)
2022	ISI Dangkor Senchey		
2022–2023	Siem Reap		
2023	Banbueng		
2023	Phitsanulok Unity		
2023–2024	Kongkrailas United		
2024–2025	Chattrakan City		
2025	Davao Aguilas	8	(0)
2025–	Dynamic Herb Cebu	8	(2)
- * Club domestic league appearances and goals as of 9:06, 29 May 2026 (UTC)

Victor Luis Ferreira Cabral (born 11 February 1995) is a Brazilian professional footballer who plays as either a central or attacking midfielder for Dynamic Herb Cebu of the Philippines Football League.

== Club career ==
=== Latin America ===
Born in São José das Palmeiras in Brazil, Cabral played his youth football in the city of São Paulo, firstly for the academy of São Bento in 2011, then for Osvaldo Cruz until 2013, when he made his professional debut. He would join Club Puebla of the Liga MX in 2015, where he remained until 2017. He would move to a number of clubs around Latin America, first playing for Sansare and Solola of Guatemala, then Olancho and Delicias FC of Honduras.

=== Cambodia ===
Cabral signed his first contract outside Latin America in 2020, signing with Kirivong Sok Sen Chey of the Cambodian Premier League in 2020, just before the onset of the COVID-19 Pandemic. He made fourteen appearances in his debut season before moving to ISI Dangkor Senchey 2 years later in 2022. Later that same year, he would leave the club and sign for another Cambodian club, Siem Reap.

=== Thailand ===
From 2023 to 2025, Cabral would sign for a number of clubs around the lower leagues of Thailand. He first signed with Banbueng in 2023, then joined Phitsanulok Unity later that same year. From 2023 to 2024 he plied his trade at Kongkrailas United, before another season-long stint at Chattrakan City until he departed the club in 2025.

=== Philippines ===
In early 2025, Cabral left Thailand to join Davao Aguilas of the Philippines Football League during the midseason transfer window. He made eight appearances as Davao finished sixth out of ten teams. He transferred to Dynamic Herb Cebu next year ahead of the club's campaign in the ASEAN Club Championship, where he made his debut against Tampines Rovers of Singapore. In the 2025–26 PFL season, he scored his first goal against Don Bosco Garelli. He scored a second goal later that season in a home game against Tuloy.
