= João Belo =

- Born: September 27, 1878; Leiria, Portugal
- Died: January 3, 1928 (aged 49); Lisbon
- Occupations: Portuguese politician, navy officer and colonial administrator
- Years active: 1895-1928

João Belo ComTE • GCTE • GCIC • ComA • GCIC (Leiria, September 27, 1878 — Lisbon, January 3, 1928) was a Portuguese Navy officer and politician and colonial administrator in Mozambique for approximately 29 years, between 1895 and 1925.

== Life ==
Belo enlisted in the Portuguese Navy in October 1893, after attending the Naval School. He sailed to Mozambique in 1895 with the rank of midshipman aboard the Duque da Terceira.

In Mozambique, he took part in "pacification" campaigns under the command of Mouzinho de Albuquerque, notably the conquest of Gaza, the Barue uprising, and the campaign against the Namarrais.

He remained in Mozambique for 29 years, where, among other prominent roles, he oversaw the supervision of the Zambezi River by a Portuguese naval flotilla.

He was initiated into Freemasonry in 1906 at the Cruzeiro Azul Lodge in Maputo, taking the symbolic name "Lobo d'Ávila" (Wolf of Avila)

In 1909, he was appointed administrator of the Xai-Xai municipality and head of the Inhampura Maritime Station at the mouth of the Limpopo river. In 1910, he was placed in charge of constructing the railway from Xai-Xai to Manjacaze. During his administration, a hydrographic survey was conducted on the mouth of the Limpopo River and bar, as well as the installation of lighthouses and navigational markers.

The Inhampura lighthouse, Xai-Xai Town Hall and Tavene hospital were also constructed during his tenure, as well as various study missions in the Limpopo River valley.

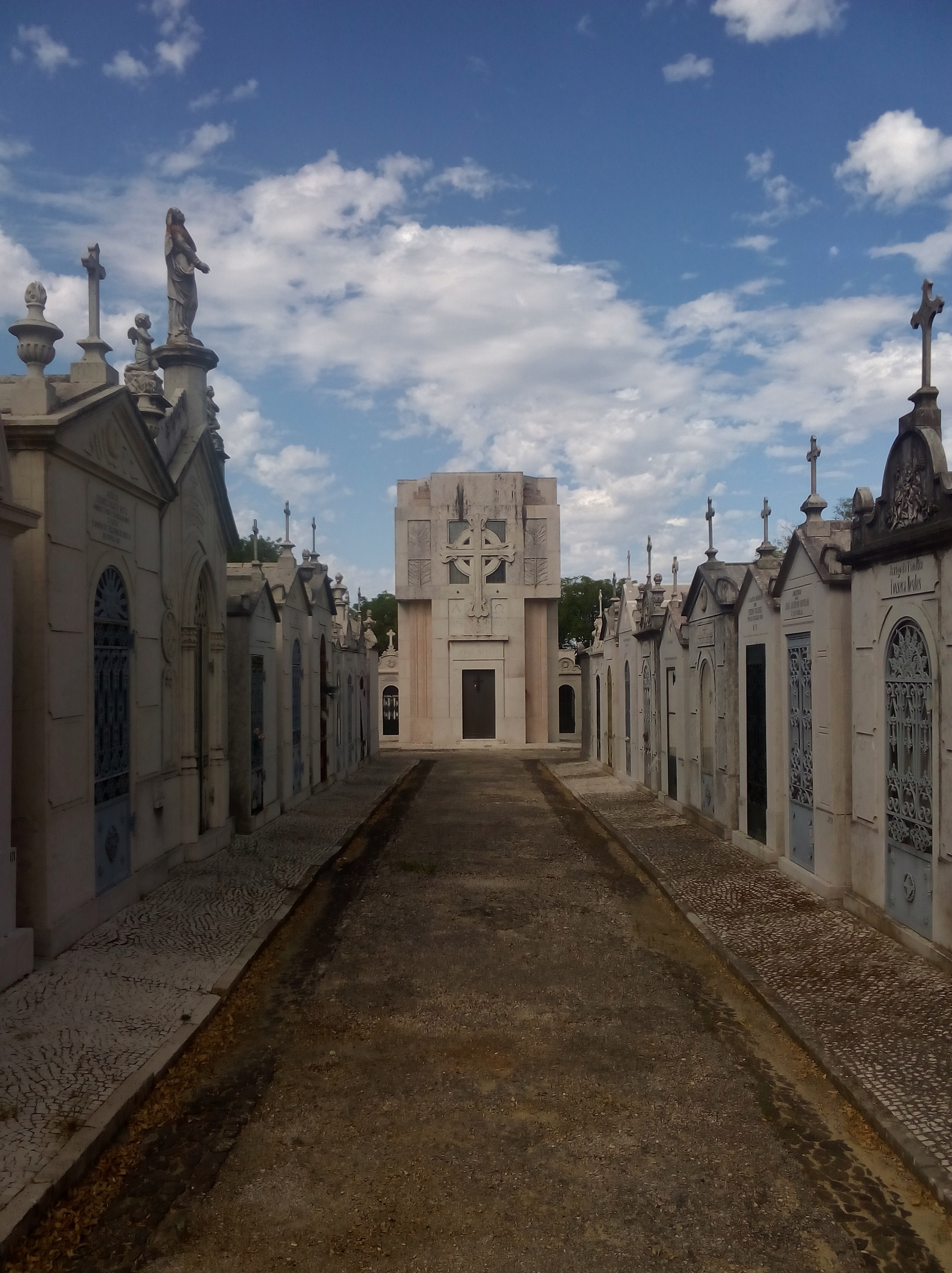
João Belo's tomb, Alto de São João Cemetery

On March 11, 1919, he was made a Commander of the Military Order of Aviz. Between 1919 and 1925, he headed the Maritime Department of Lourenço Marques, serving on the Legislative Council and the Executive Council of the Province of Mozambique.

On May 25, 1925, he was made a Commander of the Military Order of the Tower and Sword, and the Order of Valour, Loyalty and Merit.

Upon returning to Portugal, Belo worked at the Directorate of Hydrography and Navigation Services. He joined the Estado Novo following the 28 May 1926 coup d'état, and was appointed Minister of the Colonies in the National Dictatorship government in July 1926.

As the minister in charge of Portugal's overseas provinces , he carried out an ambitious reform of the Portuguese colonial administration that redefined the relationship between the metropole and its territories. This included the enactment of a new organic framework for the civil and financial administration of the colonies, the creation of a Superior Council of the Colonies and the approval of an Administrative Code.

He also oversaw the approval of a political, civil, and criminal statute for the indigenous populations of Angola and Mozambique, as well as a new statute regulating the operations of Catholic missions in these colonies.

== Death ==
Joao Belo died on January 3, 1928, at the age of 49 in Lisbon.

=== Posthumous Awards ===
Belo received two military awards after his death:

- Grand Cross of the Military Order of the Tower and Sword, of Valour, Loyalty and Merit (January 3, 1930)
- Grand Cross of the Order of the Colonial Empire (July 14, 1932)

== Legacy ==
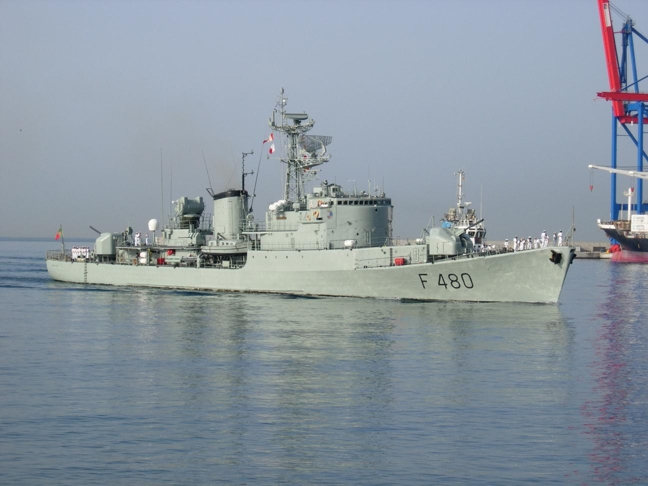
Portuguese frigate João Belo, in the port of Malaga

- The João Belo-class frigates of the Portuguese navy were named in his honour.
- The town of Xai-Xai in Mozambique's Gaza province was renamed in March 1928 to Vila João Belo. The town reverted to its previous name after Mozambique gained independence from Portugal
