= Mouzinho =

Mouzinho is a surname. Notable people with the surname include:

- João Mouzinho de Albuquerque (1797–1881), Portuguese writer and administrator
- João Pedro Mouzinho de Albuquerque (1736–1802), Portuguese nobleman
- Joaquim Augusto Mouzinho de Albuquerque (1855–1902), Portuguese soldier
- José Mouzinho (born 1885), Portuguese horse rider
- Cidália Lopes Nobre Mouzinho Guterres, first lady of East Timor
- Luís da Silva Mouzinho de Albuquerque (1792–1846), Portuguese military officer, engineer, poet, scientist and politician
- Mouzinho (footballer) (born 2002), East Timorese footballer

== See also ==
- SS Corcovado, a steamship which in 1930 was renamed Mouzinho
