= Mouzinho de Albuquerque =

Mouzinho de Albuquerque is the surname of a prominent Portuguese family of the 19th century. Its members included:

- João Pedro Mouzinho de Albuquerque (1736–1802), nobleman
- Luís da Silva Mouzinho de Albuquerque (1792–1846), son of João Pedro, military officer, poet, engineer, scientist, liberal politician and statesman
- João Mouzinho de Albuquerque (1797–1881), son of João Pedro, writer and administrator
- Joaquim Augusto Mouzinho de Albuquerque (1855–1902), grandson of Luís da Silva, military officer and African expeditionary
