= Miloš Čupić =

Serbian footballer

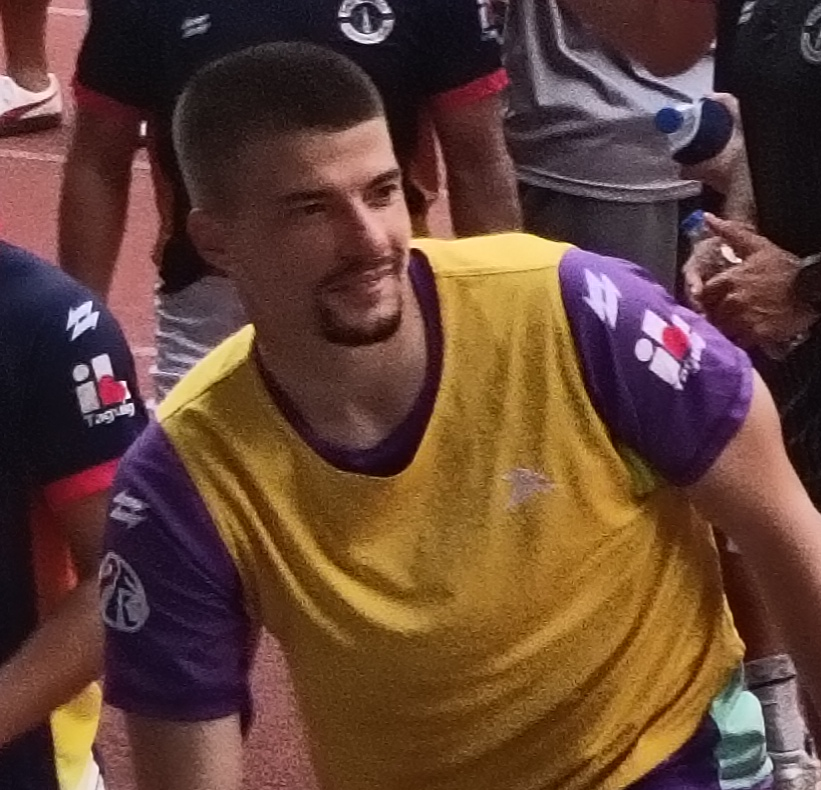
- Čupić with One Taguig in 2025

Personal information
- Full name: Miloš Čupić
- Date of birth: 24 April 1999 (age 27)
- Place of birth: Niš, FR Yugoslavia
- Height: 1.84 m (6 ft 0 in)
- Position: Goalkeeper

Team information
- Current team: Geylang International

Youth career
- OFK Beograd

Senior career*
| Years | Team | Apps | (Gls) |
| 2017–2018 | OFK Beograd | 33 | (0) |
| 2018–2021 | Red Star Belgrade | 0 | (0) |
| 2018–2019 | → Zlatibor Čajetina (loan) | 27 | (0) |
| 2020 | → Grafičar Beograd (loan) | 1 | (0) |
| 2020–2021 | → Zlatibor Čajetina (loan) | 18 | (0) |
| 2021–2023 | Inđija | 60 | (0) |
| 2024 | Van | 9 | (0) |
| 2024–2025 | Paro | | |
| 2025 | Sioni Bolnisi | 1 | (0) |
| 2025–2026 | One Taguig | 11 | (0) |
| 2026– | Geylang International | 0 | (0) |
- * Club domestic league appearances and goals as of March 11, 2026

Miloš Čupić (Serbian Cyrillic: Милош Чупић; born 24 April 1999) is a Serbian professional footballer who plays as a goalkeeper for Singapore Premier League side Geylang International FC.

== Career ==
On 8 February 2024, Armenian Premier League club Van announced the signing of Čupić on a contract until the end of the season. On 7 June 2024, Van announced that Čupić had left the club. Currently playing for Bhutanese Club Paro FC. The team emerged victorious in the preliminary stage of the AFC Challenge League, securing a spot in Group A.

Čupić signed for Singapore Premier League side Geylang International FC ahead of the 2026–27 Singapore Premier League season.

== Honours ==
Individual

- Philippines Football League: Golden Glove 2025–26
