= Goldeson =

Brazilian footballer (born 2001)

Personal information
- Full name: Goldeson Cassemiro Marques
- Date of birth: 4 February 2001 (age 25)
- Place of birth: Santana de Cataguases, Minas Gerais, Brazil
- Height: 1.84 m (6 ft 0 in)
- Positions: Attacking midfielder; centre-forward

Team information
- Current team: One Taguig
- Number: 18

Youth career
- Internacional
- 2017–2021: América Mineiro
- 2021–2023: Estoril

Senior career*
Years	Team	Apps	(Gls)
2023	Rio Branco	6	(0)
2023–2024	Democrata	4	(8)
2024	Sousa	4	(0)
2024	Nacional de Muriaé	1	(0)
2024	Ipatinga	6	(0)
2024–2025	América	10	(1)
2025	São Caetano	9	(0)
2025–	One Taguig	10	(8)
- * Club domestic league appearances and goals as of 12:43, 6 March 2026 (UTC)

Goldeson Cassemiro Marques (born 4 February 2001), known mononymously as Goldeson, is a Brazilian professional footballer who plays as an attacking midfielder or centre-forward for Philippines Football League club One Taguig.

== Club career ==
=== Youth career ===
Goldeson was born and grew up in Santana de Cataguases in southeastern Brazil. From 2017 to 2021 he played for and was one of the top scorers of the youth team of América Mineiro. In 2021, he left Mineiro to play youth football in Portugal, for the U23 team of Liga Portugal club Estoril.

=== Career in Brazil ===
Following his stint with Estoril, Goldeson went back to Brazil and signed for São Paulo-based club Rio Branco, departing two months later. A more successful stint at Democrata, a team in Minas Gerais, followed, with Goldeson staying for a year at the club.

After departing Democrata, Goldeson went to a number of clubs in 2024 in rapid succession. He stayed with Sousa EC for 3 months, then left for Nacional de Muriaé, where he left the club after playing only one match. He stayed for three months at Ipatinga, and eventually settled down at São Caetano before departing in mid-2025, with the club finishing runner-up in the Campeonato Paulista Série A4.

=== One Taguig ===
Goldeson moved abroad once more after São Caetano, this time signing for One Taguig of the Philippines Football League, where he played attacking midfield. He scored eight goals in his first 10 games at the club, which included a hat trick against Philippine Army.
