= Verza =

Verza may refer to:

- Verza (footballer), Spanish former professional footballer
- Ricardo Verza (born 1997), Brazilian footballer
- Vinicio Verza (born 1957), retired Italian professional footballer
- Honda Verza, single-cylinder standard/naked bike made by Astra Honda Motor

== See also ==
- Verze
