= Kim Jin-hyun =

Kim Jin-hyun may refer to:

- Kim Jin-hyeon (born 6 July 1987), South Korean football goalkeeper
- Kim Jin-hyun (footballer, born 1987 in Haenam) (born 29 July 1987), South Korean football defender
- Kim Jin-hyeon (footballer, born 1995), South Korean footballer
