= Timothy Shiraoka =

Japanese footballer

Personal information
- Date of birth: 8 September 1996 (age 30)
- Place of birth: Hatsukaichi, Japan
- Height: 1.90 m (6 ft 3 in)
- Position: Goalkeeper

Team information
- Current team: Aguilas–UMak
- Number: 50

Youth career
- Hatsukaichi FC
- –2015: Sanfrecce Hiroshima

College career
Years	Team	Apps	(Gls)
2015–2019	Doshisha University		

Senior career*
Years	Team	Apps	(Gls)
2019–2022	Iwaki FC	12	(0)
2022–2023	Hokkaido Tokachi Sky Earth	9	(0)
2023–2024	Okinawa SV		(0)
2024–2025	Edo All United		(0)
2025–	Aguilas–UMak	8	(1)

International career^{‡}
2012–2013	Japan U17	5	(0)
- * Club domestic league appearances and goals as of 7:55, February 11, 2026 (UTC) ‡ National team caps and goals as of 7:55, January 5, 2026 (UTC)

Timothy Shiraoka (白岡 ティモシィ, Shiraoka Teimosii; born 8 September 1996) is a Japanese professional footballer who plays as a goalkeeper for Philippines Football League club Aguilas–UMak. He has represented Japan at the U17 level and is also known for being the first keeper to score a goal in the PFL.

== Youth career ==
Shiraoka was born in the city of Hatsukaichi in Hiroshima Prefecture. He played for the youth team of Hatsukaichi FC, and from junior high school upwards played for the youth team of Sanfrecce Hiroshima.

After graduating from high school, he studied in Doshisha University and played for the varsity football team until graduating in 2019.

== Career ==
=== Career in Japan ===
After graduating from university, Shiraoka played for a number of clubs in Japan's lower leagues. He joined Iwaki FC, then of the Tohoku Soccer League, earning promotion to the JFL at the end of the season. He played for Iwaki up until 2022, when it was announced that he was joining Hokkaido Tokachi Sky Earth.

Shiraoka left Hokkaido in 2023 after the expiration of his contract, signing for Okinawa SV. After a season with the club, he signed with Edo All United, departing the club in 2025.

=== Aguilas–UMak ===
In August 2025, Shiraoka signed his first contract abroad with Aguilas–UMak of the Philippines Football League ahead of the 2025–26 season. He played 6 games in the first half of the season, keeping one clean sheet. On November 11, 2025, he became the first goalkeeper to score a goal in the PFL, scoring a late header against Stallion Laguna to tie the game, 2–2.

== International career ==
=== Japan U17 ===
In 2012, Shiraoka was called up for the Japan U17 national team for a friendly against Turkey. He would get subsequent call-ups to the team and represented Japan at the 2013 FIFA U-17 World Cup in the United Arab Emirates, where Japan made it to the Round of 16 before losing to Sweden.
