= Martini Rey =

Filipino footballer (born 1999)

Personal information
- Full name: Geri Martini Veliganio Rey
- Date of birth: 13 June 1999 (age 27)
- Place of birth: Barotac Nuevo, Iloilo, Philippines
- Position: Attacking midfielder

Team information
- Current team: Kaya–Iloilo
- Number: 77

Youth career
- Loyola

College career
Years	Team	Apps	(Gls)
2019–2024	Far Eastern University		

Senior career*
Years	Team	Apps	(Gls)
2022–2023	Stallion Laguna	0	(0)
2022	→ Azkals Development Team (loan)	4	(0)
2024–	Kaya–Iloilo	22	(10)

International career^{‡}
2018	Philippines U19	5	(0)
2022	Philippines U23	1	(0)
- * Club domestic league appearances and goals as of 03:29, 18 August 2025 (UTC) ‡ National team caps and goals as of 03:29, 18 August 2025 (UTC)

Geri Martini Veliganio Rey (born 13 June 1999) is a Filipino professional footballer who plays as an attacking midfielder for Philippines Football League club Kaya–Iloilo and the Philippines national team. He has also represented the Philippines at the under-19 and under-23 levels internationally.

== Club career ==
=== UAAP ===
Rey was born in Barotac Nuevo, Iloilo, often labelled as the "football capital of the Philippines". He studied at Barotac Nuevo Elementary School and represented Western Visayas in the Palarong Pambansa. He also played for the youth team of PFL club Loyola FC.

In 2019, Rey joined the college football team of Far Eastern University, playing with them until 2025, where he became team captain and won one UAAP championship. He also led FEU in the 2023 Copa Paulino Alcantara, where they competed against local club teams.

His college career concluded in the UAAP Season 86 final, where FEU bitterly lost 1–0 to the University of the Philippines.

== Club career ==
While still playing in the UAAP, Rey signed a contract with Stallion Laguna of the Philippines Football League in 2022. However, he didn't play any matches for the club, and was loaned out to the Azkals Development Team, where he made 4 appearances in the 2022 Copa Paulino Alcantara.

In 2024, after graduating from FEU, he signed for hometown club Kaya–Iloilo. He made his debut in a win against Tuloy, and on his first start for the club he scored four goals in a commanding 14–0 win over Manila Montet. He continued his form with Kaya into the next season, scoring a late equalizer against Davao Aguilas on the opening matchday.

== International career ==
=== Philippines U19 ===
Rey received his first national team call up in 2018, where he played for the Philippines under-19 national team at the 2018 AFF U-19 Championship. He made his debut in the opening matchday, a 2–1 win over Singapore. On his last game, a 7–2 loss to Laos, he was sent off.

=== Philippines U23 ===
In 2022, during his stint with the ADT, Rey was called up as part of the 20-man squad for the Philippines under-23 team at the 2021 Southeast Asian Games. He made his first and only appearance for the team on the opening matchday, a 4–0 win over Timor Leste.
