= Pathy Malumandsoko =

French footballer (born 2000)

Personal information
- Full name: Pathy Alondo Malumandsoko
- Date of birth: 11 May 2000 (age 26)
- Place of birth: Fontainebleau, France
- Height: 1.85 m (6 ft 1 in)
- Position: Centre-back

Team information
- Current team: Kaya–Iloilo
- Number: 4

Senior career*
Years	Team	Apps	(Gls)
2017–2021	SM Caen II	12	(0)
2021	SM Caen	0	(0)
2021–2023	Apollon Pontus	32	(2)
2023	Metalist Kharkiv	5	(1)
2024	Tanjong Pagar United	11	(0)
2024–2025	Legnago	3	(0)
2025–2026	GC Lucciana	6	(0)
2026–	Kaya–Iloilo	5	(1)
- * Club domestic league appearances and goals as of 11 March 2026

Pathy Alondo Malumandsoko (born 11 May 2000) is a French professional footballer who plays as a centre-back for Philippines Football League club Kaya–Iloilo.

== Career ==
=== SM Caen ===
In 2017, Malumandsoko played for SM Caen II, moving to the senior team in 2020.

=== Apollon Pontus ===
The following year, Malumandsoko moved to Greece to join Apollon Pontus.

=== Metalist Kharkiv ===
In March 2023, Malumandsoko signed for Metalist Kharkiv in the Ukrainian Premier League.

=== Tanjong Pagar United ===
After being released by Metalist in July 2023, Malumandsoko found his next club in Singapore. He was announced as a new signing for Tanjong Pagar United in March 2024.

=== Legnago ===
On 27 August 2024, Malumandsoko moved to Legnago in Italian third-tier Serie C.

== Career statistics ==
As of match played 14 Mar 2026

Club	Season	League			Cup		Continental		Other		Total	
Club	Season	Division	Apps	Goals	Apps	Goals	Apps	Goals	Apps	Goals	Apps	Goals
SM Caen	2020–21	Ligue 2	0	0	0	0	0	0	0	0	0	0
SM Caen	Total		0	0	0	0	0	0	0	0	0	0
Apollon Pontus	2021–22	Super League Greece 2	24	2	1	0	0	0	0	0	25	2
Apollon Pontus	2022–23	Super League Greece 2	8	0	4	0	0	0	0	0	12	0
Apollon Pontus	Total		32	2	5	0	0	0	0	0	37	2
FC Metalist Kharkiv	2022–23	Ukrainian Premier League	5	1	0	0	0	0	0	0	5	1
FC Metalist Kharkiv	Total		5	1	0	0	0	0	0	0	5	1
Tanjong Pagar United	2024–25	Singapore Premier League	11	0	0	0	0	0	0	0	11	0
Tanjong Pagar United	Total		11	0	0	0	0	0	0	0	11	0
Legnago	2024–25	Serie C	3	0	0	0	0	0	0	0	3	0
Legnago	Total		3	0	0	0	0	0	0	0	3	0
Kaya	2025- 26	Philippines Football League	1	1	0	0	0	0	0	0	1	1
Kaya	Total		1	1	0	0	0	0	0	0	1	1
Career total			52	4	5	0	0	0	0	0	57	4
