= Richard Tetteh =

Ghanaian footballer (born 2000)

Personal information
- Full name: Richard Adjah Tetteh
- Date of birth: 22 June 2000 (age 26)
- Place of birth: Ghana
- Height: 1.75 m (5 ft 9 in)
- Positions: Defensive midfielder; centre-back

Team information
- Current team: Aguilas–UMak
- Number: 55

Youth career
- Okwawu United

Senior career*
Years	Team	Apps	(Gls)
2021–2022	Kings Palace		
2023–2025	Aduana Stars	43	(1)
2026–	Aguilas–UMak	13	(4)
- * Club domestic league appearances and goals as of 11:23, 29 May 2026 (UTC)

Richard Adjah Tetteh (born 22 June 2000), sometimes nicknamed "Muller", is a Ghanaian professional footballer who plays as a defensive midfielder or center-back for Philippines Football League side Aguilas–UMak.

== Club career ==
=== Career in Ghana ===
Tetteh was born in Ghana, and in his youth played for the academy of Okwawu United in southern Ghana. In 2021, at 19 years old, he played senior team football for Kings Palace FC as a midfielder from 2021 to 2022. After a year without a club, he signed with former Ghana Premier League champions Aduana Stars. He made his debut on the opening matchday against Samartex, and provided an assist on the third matchday against Legon Cities. In late 2025, he departed the club after 43 appearances and one goal, which he scored against Holy Stars.

=== Aguilas–UMak ===
In early 2026, Tetteh left Ghana to sign a professional contract with Aguilas–UMak of the Philippines Football League. He made his debut in a loss to Stallion Laguna, but scored his first two goals in a game against Tuloy FC. He would play in a defensive role for the team mainly at centre-back, also contributing the winning goals against Manila Digger and Kaya–Iloilo.

== International career ==
=== Ghana A' ===
Tetteh received his first international call up in November 2024, as he was included by coach Didi Dramani in the training camp for the Ghana A' team, also known as the Black Galaxies. The camp was held in preparation for the 2024 African Nations Championship qualifiers against Nigeria.
