= Maleek Powell =

Cayman Islands footballer

Personal information
- Full name: Maleek DeAngelo Powell
- Date of birth: 1 October 2002 (age 24)
- Place of birth: George Town, Cayman Islands
- Position: Forward

Team information
- Current team: Valenzuela PB–Mendiola
- Number: 45

Senior career*
| Years | Team | Apps | (Gls) |
| 2019–2024 | Sunset FC | | |
| 2024–2025 | Empire FC | 9 | (0) |
| 2025– | Valenzuela PB–Mendiola | 2 | (0) |
- * Club domestic league appearances and goals as of 18:30, 23 March 2026 (UTC)

Maleek Powell (born 1 October 2002) is a Cayman Islands association footballer who plays for Philippines Football League club Valenzuela PB–Mendiola.

== Club career ==
Powell played for Sunset FC in the Cayman Islands Premier League for over five seasons beginning in 2019. In February 2024, he joined Empire FC in the Antigua and Barbuda Premier Division as a reinforcement to strengthen the squad as it attempted to avoid relegation to the First Division. With the deal, Powell became the first Caymanian player to sign for a professional club in Antigua and Barbuda. He made his league debut for Empire FC on 18 February 2024 in a 2–2 draw with SAP. He played in nine matches throughout the second half of the season.

In November 2025, Powell signed a six-month professional contract with Valenzuela PB–Mendiola in the Philippines Football League. He became the first-ever player from the Cayman Islands to sign with a club in the Philippines. The player stated that his goal was to earn a contract extension before eventually moving on to professional clubs in other leagues.

== Athletics ==
Powell became the first Caymanian athlete to qualify for the CARIFTA Games in the pole vault event. In qualifying for the 2022 edition, he cleared the 3.00 meter jump to qualify at age eighteen.
