= Kaito Asano =

Japanese footballer

Personal information
- Date of birth: 24 November 2001 (age 24)
- Place of birth: Mie, Japan
- Height: 1.70 m (5 ft 7 in)
- Position: Centre-forward

Team information
- Current team: Dynamic Herb Cebu
- Number: 10

Youth career
- Perna SC
- Happu Junior High School
- 2017–2020: Yokkaichi Chuo Technical High School

Senior career*
Years	Team	Apps	(Gls)
2021–2024	Siegburger SV	90	(19)
2024–2025	Fortuna Köln II	7	(1)
2025–2026	Khangarid	9	(12)
2026–	Dynamic Herb Cebu	4	(7)
- * Club domestic league appearances and goals as of 1:48, March 3, 2026 (UTC)

Kaito Asano (浅野 快斗, Asano Kaito; born 24 November 2001) is a Japanese professional footballer who plays as a forward for Philippines Football League club Cebu.

== Personal life ==
Asano was born in Mie prefecture in Japan. He is the younger brother of Nagoya Grampus midfielder Yuya Asano, and Japanese international and Mallorca winger Takuma Asano.

== Youth career ==
Asano played youth football in and around Mie prefecture, including for Perna SC. In high school, he played for Yokkaichi Chuo Technical High School, following the footsteps of his brothers. He starred for his high school in the 2019 All Japan High School Soccer Tournament, where they lost to Yaita Chuo high school in the quarterfinals. After the loss, Asano decided to forgo university in Japan and study in Germany.

== Career ==
=== Germany ===
In Germany, Asano first signed for Siegburger SV of the Mittelrheinliga. He stayed there until 2024, scoring 19 goals in 90 appearances, which included a hat trick against FC Hennef. Together with his Japanese teammates Masahiro Fujiwara and Shogo Akiba, he shared the apartment of the club's former groundskeeper. In 2024, he departed for the under-23 team of Fortuna Köln.

=== Mongolia ===
In 2025, Asano moved to Mongolia to sign with Khangarid FC of the Mongolian Premier League, where he reunited with former teammate Shogo Akiba. His contract was renewed in the summer and Khangarid qualified for the AFC Challenge League playoffs, where he scored in a loss to Tainan City of Taiwan.

=== Philippines ===
In February 2024, Asano signed with Dynamic Herb Cebu of the Philippines Football League, taking the number 10 from the departing Rico Andes. He made his debut in the ASEAN Club Championship against BG Pathum United, and scored on his PFL debut against Philippine Army, racking up 7 goals and 4 assists in his first four games.
