= Kevin Ebene Moukouta =

Cameroonian footballer (born 1994)

Personal information
- Full name: Jacques Eloge Kevin Ebene Moukouta
- Date of birth: 3 February 1994 (age 32)
- Place of birth: Douala, Cameroon
- Height: 1.75 m (5 ft 9 in)
- Position: Winger

Team information
- Current team: Stallion Laguna
- Number: 45

Youth career
- 2004: AS Ibrahim
- 2006–2008: AS Avenir
- 2008–2009: KSA
- 2009: DAGA Young Stars
- 2009–2013: AS Africa Star
- 2013–2015: Mega Star

Senior career*
Years	Team	Apps	(Gls)
2015–2017	Les Astres		
2017–2018	UMS de Loum		
2018–2021	Feutcheu		
2021	Unisport de Bafang		
2021–2022	Victoria United		
2022–2023	Fovu Club		
2023–2024	AS Kigali		
2024–2025	Stallion Laguna	4	(1)
2025	Manila Digger	12	(4)
2026–	Stallion Laguna	4	(1)
- * Club domestic league appearances and goals as of 11:07, 13 March 2026 (UTC)

Jacques Eloge Kevin Ebene Moukouta (born 3 February 1994), also known as Kevin Ebene Moukouta or Kevin Moukouta, is a Cameroonian professional footballer who plays as a winger for Stallion Laguna of the Philippines Football League.

== Club career ==
=== Youth ===
Moukouta was born in Douala, Cameroon. At 10 years old, he first played youth football for AS Ibrahim. Up until turning 20, he played for various youth teams around Cameroon before leaving Mega Star FA to play professionally.

=== Career in Cameroon ===
In 2015, Moukouta played senior team football for Les Astres FC of Douala, where he stayed for two seasons. Over the next few years he would play for a number of Cameroonian clubs. He signed for UMS de Loum for one season in 2017, before enjoying a more fruitful spell at Feutcheu FC before leaving in 2021.

Moukouta's next club was Unisport de Bafang in West Cameroon, where he signed a one-year contract. Later that year, he joined Unisport's rivals Victoria United. He made his debut against Léopard Douala, helping his team to a win. In 2022, he signed for Fovu Club, where he played matches in the CAF Champions League.

=== AS Kigali ===
Moukouta's first move abroad materialized in 2023, when the Cameroonian signed for Rwanda Premier League club AS Kigali. He signed a two-year contract with the club after impressing in the B&B International Football Drafting League and not making the cut at Mukura Victory Sports due to a positional conflict. He had one season with the club before departing in 2024.

=== Philippines Football League ===
In the middle of 2024, Moukouta moved to the Philippines to sign with PFL side Stallion Laguna. He scored in his first game against Maharlika Taguig after getting subbed on, also providing an assist in a crucial game against Manila Digger.

Halfway through the season, Moukouta transferred to Digger as the club pushed for the AFC Champions League Two, helping them to a runners-up finish and scoring four goals. After leaving Digger, he rejoined Stallion in 2026.

== International career ==
=== Cameroon U23 ===
While still playing for Les Astres, Moukouta received a call up to the Cameroon U23 national team for a September training camp in preparation for an October friendly against Morocco.

=== Cameroon ===
Four years later, Moukouta was called up to the Cameroon senior national team, being on the waitlist for Cameroon as part of a local training camp in preparation for the 2020 African Nations Championship.
