= Dini Ouattara =

Ivorian footballer

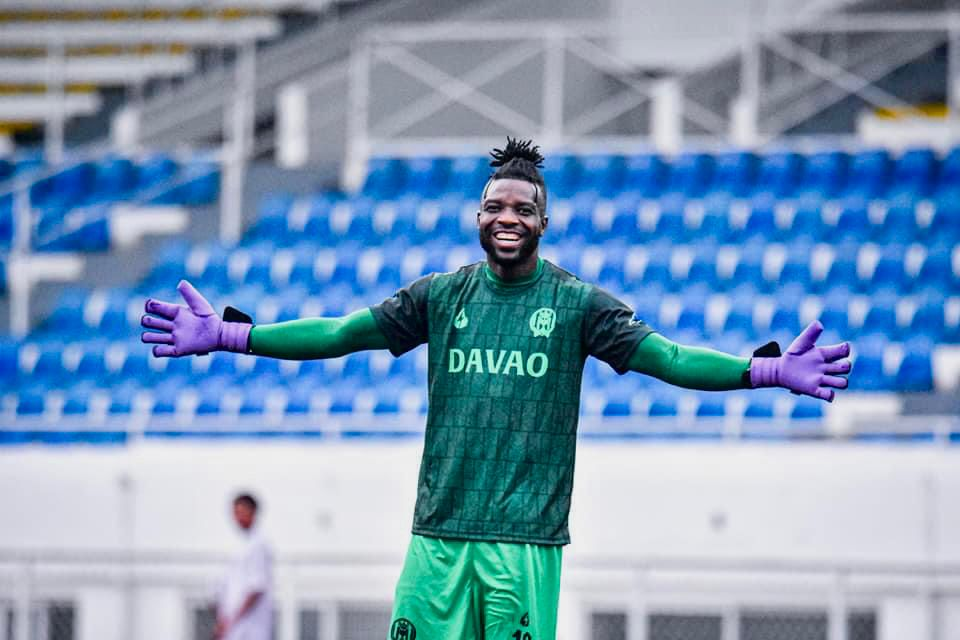
- Dini with Davao Aguilas in 2023

Personal information
- Full name: Dini Tato Ouattara
- Date of birth: 21 December 1994 (age 31)
- Place of birth: Agbaillé, Ivory Coast
- Height: 1.85 m (6 ft 1 in)
- Position: Goalkeeper

Team information
- Current team: Manila Digger
- Number: 21

Youth career
- 2010–2012: SOA Academy

Senior career*
Years	Team	Apps	(Gls)
2012–2013	SOA		(0)
2014–2016	Al-Nahda Libya	14	(0)
2017–2018	Stallion Laguna	19	(0)
2018–2019	Inter Manila	17	(0)
2019–2021	Mendiola	21	(0)
2021–2023	Uthongathi		
2023–2025	Davao Aguilas	36	(0)
2025–2026	Maharlika		
- * Club domestic league appearances and goals

Dini Ouattara (born 21 December 1994) is an Ivorian professional footballer who plays as a goalkeeper.

== Club career ==
=== Ivory Coast ===
Ouattara was born in Agbaillé, Ivory Coast. He started his career at Société Omnisports de l'Armée academy in Ivory Coast. After couple of years he got promoted to the senior team of SOA.

=== Al-Nahda ===
In 2014, he first move abroad to Libya. There he signed a two-year contract with Al Nahda. Playing in Libya helps him a lot professionally. He got some official matches under his belt, then he decided to move to Asia for better contract for the future.

=== Stallion ===
In 2016, Ouattara moved to Asia and received contract in 2nd division Philippines club Stallion FC. After impressive performance in Stallion, Ouattara got recruited by Inter Manila for 6 months.

=== Mendiola ===
In January 2019, Ouattara got an offer from top division Philippines league club, Mendiola. He was one of the best goalkeepers in the league and had 10 clean sheets in the league. In 2020, Ouattara again signed with Mendiola for one more season.

=== Uthongathi ===
In 2021, Ouattara got an offer from The National First Division club, Uthongathi F.C. He was one of the goalkeepers that performed for the team during the GladAfrica Championship.
