= Oliver Colina =

Filipino football coach (born 1982)

Personal information
- Full name: Oliver Donaire Colina
- Date of birth: May 7, 1982 (age 44)

Managerial career
- Years: Team
- 2012: Philippines U14
- –2019: SHS-AdC Magis Eagles (secondary)
- 2012–2019: Leylam
- 2020: Kaya–Iloilo
- 2021–2022: Cebu
- 2022: Philippines U23 (assistant)
- 2022: ADT (assistant)
- 2024-: Kaya–Iloilo (assistant)

Oliver "Bingbing" Donaire Colina (born May 7, 1982) is a Filipino football coach. He is currently the assistant coach of Philippines Football League club Kaya-Iloilo.

== Coaching career ==
=== Philippines U14 ===
Colina has coached the Philippine national under-14 team leading the national youth side to a third-place finish at the 2012 Japan-East Asean Football Exchange Programme U-14 Youth Football Festival in Osaka.

=== Sacred Heart and Leylam ===
Colina has concurrently coached the secondary football team of the Sacred Heart School-Ateneo de Cebu (SHS-AdC) and Leylam F.C.. He had led the former to secondary titles of the CESAFI, Mandaue City Meet and the Central Visayas Regional Athletic Association and the latter to at least three Men's Open titles in the Aboitiz Cup. He has been head coach of Leylam since its formation in 2012.

With the endorsement from the Cebu Football Association, he took the Asian Football Confederation (AFC) ‘A’ Coaching Certificate Course which was handled by the Philippine Football Federation and was conducted in two phases in 2017 and 2018. Colina became the second football coach from Cebu to earn an AFC "A" license in 2019, with the first being Mari Aberasturi. With the coaching license, Colina became eligible to coach a Philippines Football League side.

=== Kaya-Iloilo ===
Colina was appointed by Philippines Football League (PFL) club, Kaya–Iloilo to guide the team in their 2020 AFC Cup stint. Colina temporarily left his coaching position from both SHS-AdC and Leylam after he was granted a leave of absence by both teams. Colina led Kaya to a 2–0 win in their AFC Cup tie with Myanmar club Shan United which was also Colina's first competitive match with Kaya.

=== Dynamic Herb Cebu ===
In 2021, Colina returned to Cebu and was appointed head coach of PFL club Dynamic Herb Cebu for their debut season.

=== Philippines U23 and ADT ===
After a season with Cebu, Colina was appointed as assistant coach for Philippines U23 and ADT, assisting Norman Fegidero at the 2021 Southeast Asian Games.
