= Yuya Tanaka =

Japanese footballer (born 2000)

Personal information
- Date of birth: 10 May 2000 (age 26)
- Place of birth: Chiba, Japan
- Height: 1.85 m (6 ft 1 in)
- Position: Goalkeeper

Team information
- Current team: Oita Trinita
- Number: 1

Youth career
- –2015: JSC Chiba
- 2016–2018: Ichiritsu Funabashi High School

Senior career*
Years	Team	Apps	(Gls)
2019–2026	Giravanz Kitakyushu	77	(0)
2026–	Oita Trinita	3	(0)
- * Club domestic league appearances and goals as of 16 August 2026

Yuya Tanaka (田中 悠也, Tanaka Yuya; born 10 May 2000) is a Japanese footballer who plays as a goalkeeper for Oita Trinita.

== Career statistics ==
=== Club ===
As of 12 August 2021

Appearances and goals by club, season and competition
Club	Season	League			National Cup		League Cup		Other		Total	
Club	Season	Division	Apps	Goals	Apps	Goals	Apps	Goals	Apps	Goals	Apps	Goals
Giravanz Kitakyushu	2019	J3 League	0	0	0	0	0	0	0	0	0	0
Giravanz Kitakyushu	2020	J2 League	0	0	0	0	0	0	0	0	0	0
Giravanz Kitakyushu	2021	J2 League	1	0	0	0	0	0	0	0	1	0
Career total			1	0	0	0	0	0	0	0	1	0
