= Ousmane Badji =

French footballer (born 1994)

Personal information
- Full name: Ousmane Badji
- Date of birth: 14 December 1994 (age 31)
- Place of birth: Paris, France
- Height: 1.94 m (6 ft 4 in)
- Positions: Centre-back; left-back

Team information
- Current team: Stallion Laguna
- Number: 95

Youth career
- Cergy Pontoise

Senior career*
Years	Team	Apps	(Gls)
2015–2018	Cergy Pontoise	1	(0)
2018–2019	Bobigny	5	(0)
2019–2020	Bourges Foot	15	(0)
2020–2021	Concarneau	35	(0)
2021–2022	Boulogne	10	(0)
2022–2023	Villefranche	16	(0)
2023–2024	Racing CFF	8	(1)
2024–2025	Beauvais Oise	31	(1)
2025–2026	FC Rousset SVO	11	(0)
2026–	Stallion Laguna	3	(0)
- * Club domestic league appearances and goals as of 7:25, 7 March 2026 (UTC)

Ousmane Badji (born 14 December 1994) is a French professional footballer who plays as a centre-back for Philippines Football League club Stallion Laguna.

== Personal life ==
Badji was born in Paris but grew up in Val-d'Oise to the north of the capital, initially training in athletics in the region's running tracks. He is of French-Senegalese heritage.

== Club career ==
=== Youth career ===
Badji played for the youth team of Cergy Pontoise, first playing for the team's U17 and U19 team. He also had a stint with the senior team that lasted from 2015 to 2018.

=== Early pro career ===
Badji initially struggled to get minutes, also working in fast food restaurants before first signing with the then-named AF Bobigny in France's Championnat National 2 from 2018 to 2019. He had a more successful stint at Bourges Foot in the same league, where he made a significant impression within half a season.

=== Championnat National ===
After the club's season was put on hold due to the COVID-19 Pandemic, Badji moved clubs to get game time, moving up one tier to play for Concarneau in the Championnat National. He had his most successful stint yet in his second season, making 27 appearances at left back.

In November 2021, Badji departed Concarneau after mutually terminating his contract with the club, signing for struggling US Boulogne in the same league. He departed the club in the summer after they were relegated.

=== Injury and recovery ===
In the summer transfer window Badji signed for Villefranche in the National, seeking more game time. After 16 games for the club, he saw his season come to an abrupt end against his former club Concarneau after he ruptured his Achilles tendon, putting him out of action until July.

Seeking to bounce back from his injury, Badji returned to football after signing with Racing Club in the National 2, making eight appearances in the season. He transferred again a season later to AS Beauvais also in the National 2 where he had a more successful season, making 31 appearances.

=== Stallion ===
After a short stint with FC Rousset in France's lower tiers, Badji moved abroad for the first time, signing a contract with Stallion Laguna of the Philippines Football League. He made his debut for the team in a win over Aguilas–UMak.
