= Overseas Ministry =

Overseas Ministry may refer to:

- Overseas Ministry (Portugal)
- Overseas Ministry (Spain)
- Ministry of the Overseas (France)
