= Park Jae-hyun =

Park Jae-hyun (Korean: 박재현) is the name of:

- Park Jae-hyun (footballer) (born 1980), South Korean footballer
- Park Jae-hyun (baseball) (born 2006), South Korean baseball player
