= São José das Palmeiras =

Coordinates: 22°33′S 47°12′W

- Municipality
- Interactive map of São José das Palmeiras
- Country: Brazil
- Region: Southern
- State: Paraná
- Mesoregion: Oeste Paranaense

Population (2020)
  - Total: 3,627
- Time zone: UTC−3 (BRT)

São José das Palmeiras is a municipality in the state of Paraná in the Southern Region of Brazil.

== See also ==
- List of municipalities in Paraná
