= Julius Myrbakk =

Norwegian footballer (born 2000)

Personal information
- Full name: Julius Alexander Myrbakk
- Date of birth: December 21, 2000 (age 25)
- Place of birth: Tønsberg, Norway
- Height: 1.79 m (5 ft 10 in)
- Position: Striker

Team information
- Current team: Kaya–Iloilo
- Number: 17

Senior career*
Years	Team	Apps	(Gls)
2018–2019	FK Tønsberg	1	(0)
2019–2021	Flint	1	(2)
2021–2022	Fram Larvik	27	(0)
2022	Lyn Fotball	2	(0)
2022–2024	Eik Tønsberg	62	(56)
2024–2026	Arendal	36	(7)
2026–	Kaya–Iloilo	5	(7)
- * Club domestic league appearances and goals as of 11:17, March 2, 2026 (UTC)

Julius Alexander Myrbakk (born 21 December 2000) is a Norwegian professional footballer who plays as a forward for Philippines Football League club Kaya–Iloilo. He is also eligible to represent the Philippines internationally.

== Personal life ==
Myrbakk was born in the city of Tønsberg in Norway, to a Norwegian father and a Filipino-American mother. He lived in the United States for several years before moving back to Norway to play football.

== Club career ==
=== Early career in Norway ===
After returning to Norway, Myrbakk played for his hometown club FK Tønsberg. At the start of 2019, he signed with Third Division side Flint. From 2021 to 2022, he played with more lower tier sides, plying his trade with Fram Larvik and Lyn Fotball.

=== Tønsberg ===
In 2022, Myrbakk signed with another Third Division side, Eik Tønsberg. In 2023, he led the club to promotion to the 2. divisjon, scoring 36 goals in 28 games. He continued his streak in the next season, scoring 20 goals in 34 games, where he also played alongside Scott Woods, another player with Filipino-Norwegian heritage. However, in August, Myrbakk would leave Eik Tønsberg to sign for mid-table side Arendal in the same league.

=== Arendal ===
Myrbakk spent 2 years at Arendal, helping the club jump up from lower table in the 2024 season to placing fifth in the 2025 season and scoring 7 goals in 36 games. At the end of 2025, he announced his departure from the club following the expiration of his contract in 2026.

=== Kaya–Iloilo ===
After leaving Arendal, Myrbakk moved to his mother's country of the Philippines to sign for Kaya–Iloilo of the PFL. His transfer was announced on February 2. He scored two hat tricks in his first two games for the club, with the first against Don Bosco Garelli and the second against Maharlika.

== International career ==
=== Philippines ===
Myrbakk is eligible to represent both the Philippines and Norway internationally, with his grandmother hailing from Olongapo. In 2024 he expressed his desire to represent the country internationally, and in 2025 was on the radar of then-team manager Freddy Gonzalez.
