= Kim Jin-hyeon (footballer, born 1995) =

South Korean footballer (born 1995)

Personal information
- Date of birth: 22 February 1995 (age 31)
- Place of birth: South Korea
- Height: 1.82 m (6 ft 0 in)
- Positions: Centre-forward; winger

Team information
- Current team: Maharlika
- Number: 14

Youth career
- 2011–2012: Anyang Technical High School
- 2013: FC Anyang
- –2013: Gwangmyeong Technical High School

College career
Years	Team	Apps	(Gls)
2014–2018	Gwangju University	31	(3)

Senior career*
Years	Team	Apps	(Gls)
2018–2019	Yangpyeong FC	15	(3)
2019–2023	Siheung Citizen	59	(7)
2023–2025	Ulsan Citizen	41	(6)
2025–	Maharlika	17	(4)
- * Club domestic league appearances and goals as of 4:06, April 23, 2026 (UTC)

Kim Jin-hyeon (Korean: 김진현; born 22 February 1995) is a South Korean professional footballer who plays as both a forward and left winger for Philippines Football League club Maharlika FC.

== Style of play ==
Playing primarily as a winger, Kim is described as a "versatile attacking player capable of taking responsibility for both wing forwards and even the front line". Gifted with speed and breakthrough ability, he played at centre-forward in Korea and shifted to a left winger at Maharlika.

== Youth career ==
Kim was born in South Korea and played most his youth football in the city of Anyang. He played for the city's technical high school as well as for the U18 team of current K League 1 team FC Anyang. Up until 2013, he was also playing youth football for Gwangmyeong Technical High School. From 2014 to 2018, Kim would study at Gwangju University and pursue football there, playing his last season as a senior in 2018.

== Career ==
=== South Korea ===
After graduating from university, Kim would play semi-professional football for provincial side Yangpyeong FC. He enjoyed two seasons at the club and scored three goals. In 2018, Kim was in the side that upset K League 1 side Gimcheon Sangmu (then named Sangju Sangmu) on penalties in the Korean FA Cup, making headlines.

In 2019, Kim transferred to K4 League side Siheung Citizen. After a year off due to the COVID-19 Pandemic in the country, he returned to play in 2021, and made 59 appearances over two seasons in the third division. In 2021 his attacking role in the squad became more pronounced, and he scored seven goals, helping the club get promoted to the K3 League, the third tier of Korean Football. Kim would leave the club in 2023.

Kim would transfer to fellow K3 League side Ulsan Citizen, alongside his former teammate Kim Ki-young. He joined in the middle of a transfer overhaul, scoring on his debut against Changwon City. Kim would go on to make 41 appearances over two seasons, scoring 6 goals, including a game winner against Chuncheon. He departed Ulsan in mid-2025.

=== Playing in the Philippines ===
After leaving Ulsan, Kim would move to the Philippines to play for Philippines Football League side Maharlika, under Korean coach Moon Hong and fellow Korean players Kang Young-suk and Park Eun-soo. He made his debut on the opening matchday against Tuloy, where Maharlika won and Kim would notch an assist. He scored his first two goals for the club a month later against Philippine Army, and is currently the team's top assist provider with 7 in 18 games.
