= João Pedro Mouzinho de Albuquerque =

Portuguese nobleman

João Pedro Mouzinho de Albuquerque (May 1736 in Lisbon – 1802 in Leiria (some say ca/bef. 1815)) was a Portuguese nobleman.

== Life ==
Mouzinho de Albuquerque was born in Lisbon in 1736 to Pedro Mamede Mouzinho de Albuquerque and his second wife Maria Micaela Tavares de Mesquita. He was baptized by the Desembargador Rev. Dr. Sebastião Pereira de Castro at the Monastery of São Vicente de Fora, Lisbon, on June 4, 1736. His godfather, Dom Diogo de Noronha, 3rd Marquess of Marialva and 5th Count of Cantanhede by marriage, was represented at the ceremony by his son Dom Rodrigo António de Noronha e Meneses.

Chief of Lineage, he graduated in Law and became a Fidalgo-Knight of the Royal Household by letters patent (Alvará) of March 2, 1737, becoming a Knight of the Order of Christ on April 26, 1769. His legal roles included being a Corregedor of the Crime of the Court and House of the Supplication, Desembargador of the House of the Supplication of the Palace and of the King, and he was also Commander da Lezíria do Corvilho in the Order of Christ, Member of the Royal Brotherhood of Santa Cruz and Passos da Graça. By April 21, 1796 his income was 1.6 mil-réis a month and 1 alqueire of barley a day, and he also had granted an annuity of 400 mil-réis for his daughters.

He was the last possessor of the old Mouzinho house and farm in Chelas, Lisbon, which he appears to have sold in the middle or end of 1788 to Manuel Joaquim de Freitas, who is thought to be an ancestor of the 1st Viscount of Vila Gião.

In 1786 Mouzinho de Albuquerque married Luísa Gutiérrez da Silva de Ataíde at the See of Leiria. She had been born in the parish and baptized at the same See of Leiria on September 22, 1763. She was the daughter of Luís da Silva de Ataíde, 6th Lord of the Majorat and Casa do Terreiro, and his wife, Isabel Gutiérrez de Tordoya, Maraver y Silva.

Mouzinho de Albuquerque died in 1802 and was buried at the Church of São Francisco of Leiria.

== Family ==
He and his wife had nine children:

- Pedro Mouzinho de Albuquerque
- Isabel Mouzinho de Albuquerque (Old Family House, São Vicente de Fora, Lisbon, May 28, 1788 – ?), who died unmarried and without issue
- Maria Luísa Mouzinho de Albuquerque (Old Family House, São Vicente de Fora, Lisbon, May 10, 1789 – at her old house at the Violeiros Street, Portalegre, January 17, 1907), married at the Oratory of the old Family House, São Vicente de Fora, Lisbon, July 1, 1815, being testimonies her brothers Pedro and Luís da Silva, as his second wife Fernando Pereira de Faria Cota Falcão, 9th Lord of the Majorats da Amieira and da Pipa, who made himself to be represented by his cousin Gaspar Cota Falcão Aranha de Sousa e Meneses, and had issue
- Mariana José Mouzinho de Albuquerque (Old Family House, São Vicente de Fora, Lisbon, July 27, 1790 – aft. October 2, 1863), a Professed Nun of the Order of Santiago, at the Convent of Santos o Novo, in Lisbon, by mand of King John VI of Portugal on August 1, 1819, having officiated the Prior of the Convent and Conventual Friar of Palmela João António Rebelo da Silva, and being the Commander Dona Maria Ana de Almada
- Luís da Silva Mouzinho de Albuquerque (1792–1846), military officer, poet, engineer, scientist, liberal politician and statesman
- Ana Carlota Mouzinho de Albuquerque (Old Family House, São Vicente de Fora, Lisbon, July 27, 1793 – August 2, 1811), who died unmarried and without issue
- Joana Mouzinho de Albuquerque (Old Family House, São Vicente de Fora, Lisbon, July 8, 1794 – ?), who Professed as a Nun at the Convent of Santos o Novo, in Lisbon, on July 27, 1820, accompanying her sister Mariana José
- Eugénia Matilde Mouzinho de Albuquerque (Old Family House, São Vicente de Fora, Lisbon, July 30, 1795 – ?), who died unmarried and without issue
- João Mouzinho de Albuquerque (1797–1881), writer and administrator

== Sources ==
- Cunha, Fernando de Castro Pereira Mouzinho de Albuquerque e (1906-1983), Mouzinho de Albuquerque - História e Genealogia. Lisboa, 1971, pp. 138–42
- Cunha, Fernando de Castro Pereira Mouzinho de Albuquerque e (1906-1998), Instrumentário Genealógico - Linhagens Milenárias. MCMXCV, pp. 191–2
