= João Mouzinho de Albuquerque =

Portuguese writer and administrator

João Mouzinho de Albuquerque (21 February 1797 in Leiria – 8 August 1881 in Portalegre) was a Portuguese writer and administrator.

== Biography ==
João Mouzinho de Albuquerque was born in Leiria on 21 February 1797, son of João Pedro Mouzinho de Albuquerque (1736–1802) and dona Luísa da Silva Gutiérrez de Ataíde (1763–18??), both from noble families. His father was a Fidalgo-knight of the Royal House and possessed two estates in Chelas. His mother was the daughter of Luís da Silva de Ataíde, a senior-guard of the Leiria pine forest and Lord of Casa do Terreiro.

He was Moço-Fidalgo of the Royal Household, Bachelor in Law from the University of Coimbra in 1820, Purveyor of the Casa da Moeda de Portugal, Administrator-General of the House of Braganza, etc.

He was the last holder of the Prazo of São Domingos, in Castelo de Vide, which he sold after 1834.

He married his niece Luísa Paula Mouzinho de Albuquerque (Cabanas Estate, São Brás da Romeira, Santarém, 4 January 1820 – at her old house at the Violeiros Street, Portalegre, 17 January 1907) and had an only son:

- Pedro Mouzinho de Albuquerque, who died young, unmarried and without issue

== Published works ==
- Reflexões Sobre a Agricultura Pública, Leiria, 1854
- Juízo Crítico Sobre os Actos da Administração Finda com a Morte de S. M. a Senhora Dona Maria II, Lisboa, 1854
- Memória Sobre a Moeda Portuguesa, etc, Elvas, 1862
- O Deficit, nas Origens, etc, Lisboa, 1867
