= Ricardo Verza =

Brazilian footballer

Personal information
- Full name: Ricardo Verza de Souza
- Date of birth: 28 April 1997 (age 29)
- Place of birth: Antônio Prado, Brazil
- Height: 1.81 m (5 ft 11 in)
- Position: Forward

Team information
- Current team: Kaya FC
- Number: 17

Youth career
- 2016–2018: União Rondonópolis
- 2018–2019: Goiás

Senior career*
Years	Team	Apps	(Gls)
2018–2020	Goiás	11	(6)
2018	→ KF Drita (loan)	4	(0)
2019	→ Aimoré (loan)	7	(0)
2020	→ Aparecidense (loan)	2	(0)
2020	→ São José-RS (loan)	2	(0)
2020	Goianésia	2	(1)
2021	Hetten FC	24	(12)
2022	Budaya Club	14	(3)
2023	Al-Nahda		
2023–2025	Bahrain SC	24	(13)
2025	Kaya FC		
- * Club domestic league appearances and goals as of 22 October 2023

Ricardo Verza de Souza, known as ريكاردو فيرزا (rikardu firza) or Ricardo Verza (born 28 April 1997) is a Brazilian footballer who plays as a forward for Kaya FC.

== Career ==
Verza began his futsal career with União Rondonopolis, where he had the opportunity to play a football match. Thus attracting the attention of scouts from Goiás, the club that signed him and presented him as one of the bets for the 2018 pre-season. Without space, Verza was loaned to FK Drita, a club in Kosovo, where he played just four games and was champion of the Championship Kosovar.After returning from Kosovo, Goiás loaned Verza to Aimoré.

=== Bahrain SC ===
On 3 August 2023, Verza was announced as a player for Bahrain SC, in Bahrain. In the 2023–24 season, he became the club’s top scorer, helping secure the national second division title and the team’s promotion back to the top flight. During the 2024–25 season, he suffered an injury that sidelined him for most of the campaign, finishing his spell at the club with 24 appearances.

=== Kaya FC ===
On 12 August 2025, Verza joined Kaya FC–Iloilo, in the Philippines.

== Honours ==
Bahrain SC

- Bahrain Championship – 2nd Division: 2023–24

Goiás

- Campeonato Goiano: 2018

KF Drita

- Campeonato Kosovar: 2017–18
- Supercopa do Kosovo: 2017–18

União Rondonópolis

- Copa FMF: 2017, 2021
