= Philippines Football League =

Top-division men's association football league in the Philippines

- Organising body: Liga Group Pilipinas, Inc.
- Founded: 2017; 9 years ago
- Country: Philippines
- Confederation: AFC
- Number of clubs: 11
- Level on pyramid: 1
- Domestic cup: Copa Paulino Alcantara
- International cups: AFC Champions League Two; ASEAN Club Championship
- Current champions: Manila Digger (1st title) (2025–26)
- Most championships: United City (4 titles)
- Top scorer: Bienvenido Marañón (71)
- Broadcaster: YouTube
- Current: 2026–27 Philippines Football League

The Philippines Football League (PFL) is a men's professional football league in the Philippines. Sanctioned by the Philippine Football Federation (PFF) and organized by Liga Group Pilipinas, Inc., it is the country's primary football competition. The 2025–26 season will be contested by 11 clubs from August 30, 2025. The league does not have a system of promotion and relegation. From 2018 to 2023, all PFL clubs also took part in the Copa Paulino Alcantara, the domestic cup competition.

Founded in 2017, the PFL supplanted the Metro Manila-based United Football League (UFL), which was the de facto top-tier league in the country from 2009 to 2016. Since then, 11 clubs have competed in the PFL. United City (formerly Ceres–Negros) is the most successful club, with four consecutive titles. Aside from them, the other clubs to have won the title is Kaya–Iloilo with three and Manila Digger with one.

The PFL's structure and organization has undergone several changes over the years. In 2018, the PFL was briefly dissolved due to financial and logistical issues, with the Philippine Premier League (PPL) supplanting it. However, with the folding of the PPL after just one matchday, the PFL was revived in May 2019.

== History ==
=== Origins ===
Following the success of the Philippines national team in the 2010 AFF Championship, Philippines football experienced a renaissance. With no existing national football league, the United Football League (UFL) established itself as the de facto top-tier league in the Philippines. Under the guidance of the Football Alliance (FA) in partnership with United Football Clubs Association (UFCA), the UFL flourished. However, the PFF expressed the need to have a nationwide, community-based football league that is at par with the standards set by the Fédération Internationale de Football Association (FIFA) and the Asian Football Confederation (AFC). The UFL, which was under the National Capital Region Football Association, could not be considered as a national league.

=== Foundations ===
13 localities deemed viable home venues by the Nielsen Company for prospect clubs in the PFL.: Luzon: Manila, Makati, Quezon City, Marikina, Bocaue (Bulacan), Laguna, Pampanga; Visayas: Cebu, Bacolod, Iloilo; Mindanao: Davao City, Cagayan de Oro, Zamboanga City

With the goal of establishing a truly nationwide professional football league in the Philippines, the PFF launched National League Task Force on December 2, 2013. The task force was led by PFF president Mariano Araneta Jr. and general secretary Edwin Gastanes, also composing of Filipino economist Bernie Villegas, UFL president Randy Roxas, AFC deputy general secretary and competition director Dato' Windsor John, Filipino FIFA official Domeka Garamendi, AFC kick-off program director Yogesh Desai, UFL commissioner Bonnie Ladrido, ABS-CBN's Dino Laurena, former PFF general secretary Cyril Dofitas and Gelix Mercader. The task force was tasked to do market research studies to determine the possible cities or regions where participating football clubs could be feasibly based, as well as assisting clubs in the Philippines to conform to the PFF club licensing regulations, of which the draft was initiated by Gastanes, with guidance from AFC. The PFF initially set a goal to launch the national league in two to three years from the inception of the task force. Singaporean sports marketing agency Red Card Group, led by former Singaporean international, R. Sasikumar, assisted the PFF in the initial stages of planning.

==== Nielsen study ====
Nielsen was tasked by PFF, through funding from FIFA and AFC to conduct a study in 2015, where they identified 13 key localities throughout the Philippines as viable home venues for participating clubs in the PFL. Among the factors considered were existing infrastructures, accessibility, capacity of fans to pay, the existence of sponsors, and fan appreciation of the sport. "Philippines Football League" was the most-preferred name for a prospective league according to a survey which covered interviews of 5,000 people nationwide. Other choices included "P-League", "Maharlika League" (inspired by a feudal warrior class existing in the Luzon region during the pre-colonial era), "Liga Pilipina", and "Philippine Premier League".

==== Launch ====
Shangri-La at the Fort at Bonifacio Global City where the official launch of the PFL was hosted.

The Philippines Football League was officially announced on September 7, 2016, and would be replacing the UFL as the Philippines' top-tier football league.

At least six clubs from all over the Philippines planned to be part of the PFL, with clubs from the UFL invited to join. Clubs were given until December 2016 to formally apply to join the PFL. The league competition was slated to begin in either the late March or early April 2017. By April 1, the PFF confirmed the participation of 8 clubs from - Ilocos United and Stallion Laguna from Luzon; JPV Marikina, Kaya–Makati (now Kaya–Iloilo) and Meralco Manila (now Loyola) from Metro Manila; Ceres–Negros (now United City) and Global Cebu (now Global FC) from the Visayas; Davao Aguilas from Mindanao. The official launching of the PFL happened on April 21, 2017, at the Shangri-La at the Fort in Taguig. The program was started by economist and PFL Task Force Chairman, Bernardo Villegas and ended by PFF President Mariano Araneta.

=== 2017 and 2018 seasons ===
The inaugural season in 2017 was contested by eight clubs and had two stages; the regular season and a playoff competition. The regular season adopted a home-and-away, double round-robin format. The top four teams in the regular season advanced to the play-off round, dubbed as the "Final Series", to determine the champions of the league. Ceres-Negros won the inaugural league title.

For the second season, the Final Series was scrapped due to the introduction of the Copa Paulino Alcantara, the cup competition for the league. The number of clubs in the league was reduced from eight to six after the departure of Ilocos United (then converted to a grassroots association) and FC Meralco Manila (that stayed active on a youth level ever since), both due to lack of investment and sponsorship, while Kaya-Makati F.C. relocated to Iloilo City and changed their name accordingly. Ceres-Negros won their second title.

=== Replacement by the Philippine Premier League ===
In late-2018, Triple CH led by Thailand-based Filipino businessman Bernie Sumayao became involved in the league and has entered talks with PFF chairman Mariano Araneta. He was appointed as the league's new commissioner. Sumayao pledged to institute financial and structural reforms in the league; including a rebrand of the league to the "Philippine Premier League" (PPL) starting the 2019 season, more favorable sponsorship policies, and the disestablishment of the franchise fee in favor of a less expensive registration fee for clubs.

At least eight teams were projected to play in the PPL's inaugural season. However, the end of the 2017 season also saw the departure of a third club in the league's history, Davao Aguilas Despite this, the league has received applications from several new clubs aspiring to join the PFL.

=== Revival and continued organization ===
The PPL effectively folded after the PFF announced that it has revoked its sanction of the league on May 3, 2019, due to its non compliance to the agreement with PFF. The PFL was consequently revived, with a third season planned to commence within the year. The new format proceeded as planned, with Ceres–Negros claiming their third consecutive league title despite internal managerial struggles.

The PFL secured a three-year sponsorship deal with Qatar Airways on January 26, 2020, with the Qatari firm becoming the Airline partner and Title Sponsor of the PFL. Negotiations for deal occurred as early as November 2019. The league was formally renamed as "The Philippines Football League brought to you by Qatar Airways" as a result of the sponsorship.

The 2020 season was postponed due to the COVID-19 pandemic and was later held in a bio-secure bubble in Carmona, Cavite from October 28 to November 9, 2020, while the edition of the Copa Paulino Alcantara was cancelled, due to the time constraints caused by the original postponement. Ceres-Negros, which had just sustained an ownership change and got renamed as "United City F.C.", then proceeded to win their fourth title in a row, with Kaya F.C.-Iloilo finishing second despite remaining unbeaten and thus becoming the first club in PFL's history to do so.

The same year saw the official entry in the competition of newly founded Azkals Development Team, directly controlled by the national football federation, as a guest team that would host mainly "homegrown" young talents, as well as some overage players, in order to expand the resources of the national team.

In 2021, following the rise of Philippines in the AFC rankings and the expansion of the AFC Champions League's group stage from 32 to 40 teams, United City became the first Filipino team to qualify for the group stage of the competition, as winners of the 2020 edition of the PFL. Plus, the 2021 season saw both the return of the league cup, set to be organized in April, and a slight expansion of the league, with PFL commissioner Coco Torre announcing in February that Loyola F.C. (returning to the league after competing for the last time in 2018) and former UFL team Laos F.C. (on his official debut) had submitted their respective requests to join the competition.

The 2024–25 season saw the reintroduction of the Finals Series, albeit as a distinct competition.

For the 2025–26 season it marks the first time since the league's inception where there was no change in the number of teams participating, with ten teams competing in the season. However, last season's eighth- and ninth-placed teams, Loyola and the Philippine YNT, will not participate this season. In August, two teams from the 2024 season, namely Don Bosco Garelli United, Tuloy and Philippine Army, would rejoin the league to bring the number to 11.

Davao Aguilas, who finished sixth in the previous season, relocated their club to Makati and renamed to Aguilas–UMak F.C., with the latter derived from the University of Makati Stadium, where the club had previously trained and held matches. After changing its name last season, Maharlika Taguig once again changed its name to simply Maharlika F.C.. The Mendiola FC 1991 will relocate from Imus, Cavite to Valenzuela and renamed to Valenzuela PB–Mendiola F.C.

== Competition format ==
The PFL followed a traditional home-and-away double round-robin format during the 2018, 2019, and 2022–23 seasons, although some clubs did not have their home stadiums.

The 2018 season saw 7 teams playing each other 4 times. In the 2019 season with 6 teams competing, the format was made into a quadruple round-robin format, this time playing each other 5 times whole season.

In the 2020 season, all matches were held in a bio-secure bubble single venue with 5 matches played by each team in a span of 12 days starting from October 28 to November 12. The last match was postponed due to Typhoon Vamco (Ulysses), although the match was never played, instead documented as a goalless draw against Mendiola and Stallion.

The 2022–23 season saw a switch from an intra-year format to an inter-year format due to the Asian Football Confederation changing its system of scheduling into an inter-year format. Each team played 22 games during this season, excluding United City, which withdrew mid-season.

After the success of the 2023 Copa Paulino Alcantara, the league saw an expansion from 7 teams to 15, an all-time high for the league. With this the league schedule was again switched to an intra-year format for the 2024 season, and the format changed to a single round-robin tournament with 14 matches played by each team. This season also saw most of its games played in centralized venues, with almost all games played at the Rizal Memorial Stadium.

It was only during the 2017 season that the league had two phases; the regular season and the Finals Series, a play-off round where the top four teams played to determine the league champion. The Finals Series was reintroduced for the 2024–25 season but as a distinct competition of its own.

There was a proposal to convert the former UFL to a second division tournament or a reserve league to the PFL. However, such plans never materialized.

== Qualification for Asian competitions ==
- AFC Champions League
  - 2017–2020: The league champions qualified for the preliminary round of the play-offs, and they have to renounce to their slot in the AFC Cup in case of advancement to the group stage.
  - 2021–2023: The league champions qualified directly for the group stage of the tournament; the winners of the Copa Paulino Alcantara (or the league runners-up, only for the 2020 season) qualify for the preliminary round of the play-offs, and they have to renounce to their slot in the AFC Cup in case of advancement to the group stage.
- AFC Cup / AFC Champions League Two
  - 2017: The league runners-up qualified directly for the group stage of the tournament, with third placers eligible to replace them whether they were unable to play in the competition; if the league champions failed to advance to the group stage of the AFC Champions League, they would still benefit from a free slot in the tournament.
  - 2018–2020: The winners of the Copa Paulino Alcantara qualified directly for the group stage of the tournament; if the league champions failed to advance to the group stage of the AFC Champions League, they would still benefit from a free slot in the tournament.
  - 2021–2023: The winners of the Copa Paulino Alcantara (or the league runners-up, only for the 2020 season) qualified directly for the group stage of the tournament.
  - 2024: The league champions and the winners of the Copa Paulino Alcantara qualified for the AFC Champions League Two group stage.
  - 2025: The league champions qualified for the AFC Champions League Two group stage while the runners-up qualified for the preliminary stage.
  - 2026–present: The league champions qualified for the AFC Champions League Two preliminary stage.
- AFC Challenge League
  - 2026–present: The league runners-up qualified for the AFC Challenge League preliminary stage.

== Clubs ==
Twenty-one clubs have played in the PFL since its inception in 2017, up to and including the 2025–26 season.

Overview of Philippines Football League clubs
Club	Location	Joined PFL	Founded	2025–26 position	PFL titles	Last title	Ref.
Aguilas–UMak	Makati	2017	2017	6th	0	—	
Azkals Development Club	Carmona, Cavite	2020	2020	DNP	0	—	
Dynamic Herb Cebu	Cebu City	2022	2021	3rd	0	—	
Kaya–Iloilo	Iloilo City	2017	1996	4th	3	2024–25	
Maharlika	Taguig	2020	2020	7th	0	—	
Manila Digger	Taguig	2024	2018	1st	1	2025–26	
Mendiola 1991	Valenzuela	2019	1991	10th	0	—	
Philippine Army	Taguig	2024	1960	11th	0	—	
Stallion Laguna	Biñan, Laguna	2017	2002	5th	0	—	
Tuloy	Muntinlupa	2024	2023	9th	0	—	

=== Timeline ===
League member Former member Guest team

== Champions ==
Champions

Season	Champion	Runners-up
2017 (Note: Season had a regular season and a Finals Series; the winning team in the Finals Series playoffs is the league champion. Meralco Manila was the top team in the regular season.)	Ceres–Negros (Note: United City were known as Ceres–Negros until 2020.)	Global Cebu
2018	Ceres–Negros	Kaya–Iloilo
2019	Ceres–Negros	Kaya–Iloilo
2020	United City	Kaya–Iloilo
2021	not held due to COVID-19 pandemic in the Philippines	
2022–23	Kaya–Iloilo	Dynamic Herb Cebu
2024	Kaya–Iloilo	Dynamic Herb Cebu
2024–25 (Note: Season had a regular season and a Finals Series; the top team in the regular season is the league champion.)	Kaya–Iloilo	Manila Digger
2025–26	Manila Digger	One Taguig

Performance by club

Club	Winners	Runners-up	Winning seasons	Runners-up seasons
United City	4	0	2017, 2018, 2019, 2020	–
Kaya–Iloilo	3	3	2022–23, 2024, 2024–25	2018, 2019, 2020
Manila Digger	1	1	2025–26	2024–25
Dynamic Herb Cebu	0	2	–	2022–23, 2024
Global Cebu	0	1	–	2017
One Taguig	0	1	–	2025–26

== Organization ==
The Philippines Football League, along with the Copa Paulino Alcantara, is managed by the Pasig-based Liga Futbol Inc. Singapore-based Red Card Global, a sports marketing agency has exclusive commercial rights to the PFL. Each club had to pay a franchise fee to participate in the league. Reportedly in April 2017, the franchise fee was pegged at $500,000 by the PFF which can be paid by member clubs within a period of five years.

The league is professional in nature, clubs are intended to have a share of the league's broadcast revenues and sponsorship. Each club is allowed to be assisted by the league in securing their own sponsors. The professional status of the league is recognized by the Games and Amusements Board, the regulatory body for professional sports in the Philippines. In October 2018, the Philippines Football Federation was awarded the League Development award by the Asian Football Confederation for its organization of the PFL.

=== Club identity ===
All PFL clubs were required under the PFF club licensing regulations to have a name that includes the name of their home locality. The clubs were also required to have nicknames, crests, and colors based on the unique characteristics of their home locality.

=== Players and salaries ===
Participating clubs were allowed to have between 25 and 30 players. Reportedly in September 2016, four foreign players were allowed per club, with at least one coming from an AFC country. On January 17, 2017, it was reported that foreign player limit rule was yet to be finalized by the PFF.

=== Youth development ===
All participating clubs in the PFL were required to commit to the organization and development of at least two youth teams, one under 18 and another under 15. The clubs' youth teams were required to participate in competitions organized by the Philippine Football Federation.

=== Stadiums ===
The clubs of the PFL were required to have a certified home stadium, either through ownership or having an active contract with the owners of the stadium. Likewise, all clubs were required to have access to or own a training facility, although some clubs have been allowed to participate without a designated home stadium.

== Sponsorship ==
Title sponsor

Company	Period	Ref.
Qatar Airways	2020–2023	

== Media coverage ==
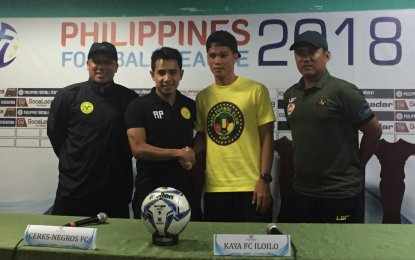
Press conference held prior to a league match between Ceres-Negros and Kaya-Iloilo. May 11, 2018.

The Philippine Football Federation had an agreement with the People's Television Network to broadcast matches of the league which was signed in April 2017 though the network coverage of the league didn't last at least half a season. Matches since then were live streamed through the MyCujoo online platform.

On February 22, 2018, the league had signed an agreement with Sportradar which would enable it livestream matches through Sportradar's Over-The-Top (OTT) platform. In April 2018, Liga Futbol Inc. approved a budget to secure a broadcasting partner for the 2018 season.

For the 2019 season, all matches were streamed on Facebook and the league's official website.

The Qatar Airways sponsorship deal signed with the league in January 2020 included provisions to broadcast selected matches live on television. On October 15, during the virtual conference of the official launch of the 2020 PFL season, PFF President Mariano Araneta announced the partnership with One Play Sports as digital content partner. Matches were also broadcast on cable television through EXPTV on Cignal and on the PFL's social media.

On April 4, 2024, the league announced that they will have television coverage through Premier Sports on Cignal and Sky Cable and livestream via Blast TV, Fiber TV and the PFL website. In the same month, Matchday Media was announced to be the content and business development partner of the PFL, providing pitchside reporters for the league's coverage.

On January 8, 2025, all remaining games of the first and second round will be streamed live on matchday+.

Starting August 30, 2025 to present, all games will be livestreamed on PFL's YouTube page.
